= Sing! China season 7 =

Sing! China
- Season 7
- Hosted by: Hu Qiaohua; Andy Lau
- Coaches: Li Ronghao; Hacken Lee; Liao Changyong (blinds - cross battles); Coco Lee (knockouts - finals); Fish Leong; Huang Xiaoyun & Curley G (comeback stage)
- Winner: Sumi Liang 梁玉莹
- Winning coach: Hacken Lee
- Runner-up: Claire Choi 蔡子伊

Release
- Original network: Zhejiang Television
- Original release: 5 August – 28 October 2022

Season chronology
- ← Previous; Season 6 Next → Season 8

The seventh season of the Chinese reality talent show Sing! China premiered on 5 August 2022. Li Ronghao and Hacken Lee returned as coaches for their fourth and second seasons respectively. In the last season, Liao Changyong was featured as a part-time coach after replacing Na Ying from the Cross Battle round onwards; this season he returned again as a part-time coach but was replaced by Coco Lee after the Cross Battle rounds. Fish Leong joined the panel as a new coach this season, replacing Wang Feng from the previous season.

On 14 October 2022, Sumi Liang was announced the winner of the season, marking Hacken Lee's second win as a coach and the first coach to win multiple consecutive seasons.

== Coaches and hosts ==
On 13 July 2022, it was announced that Li Ronghao and Hacken Lee would both resume their roles as coaches. Liao Changyong was also confirmed to be returning again as a part-time coach and was later replaced by Coco Lee. Fish Leong was announced to join the show as a new coach. Wang Feng was therefore confirmed to have exited the series.

On 17 July 2022, it was announced that Andy Li would be joining the show as a spector and part-time host along with Hu Qiaohua.

In addition, the teaching assistant panel was not reinstated this season, leading to the departures of Momo Wu, Jike Junyi, and Zhang Bichen. However, Huang Xiaoyun returned but this time she will be featured as a comeback stage coach alongside season 2 semi-finalist Curley G.

Sing! China season 7 coaches

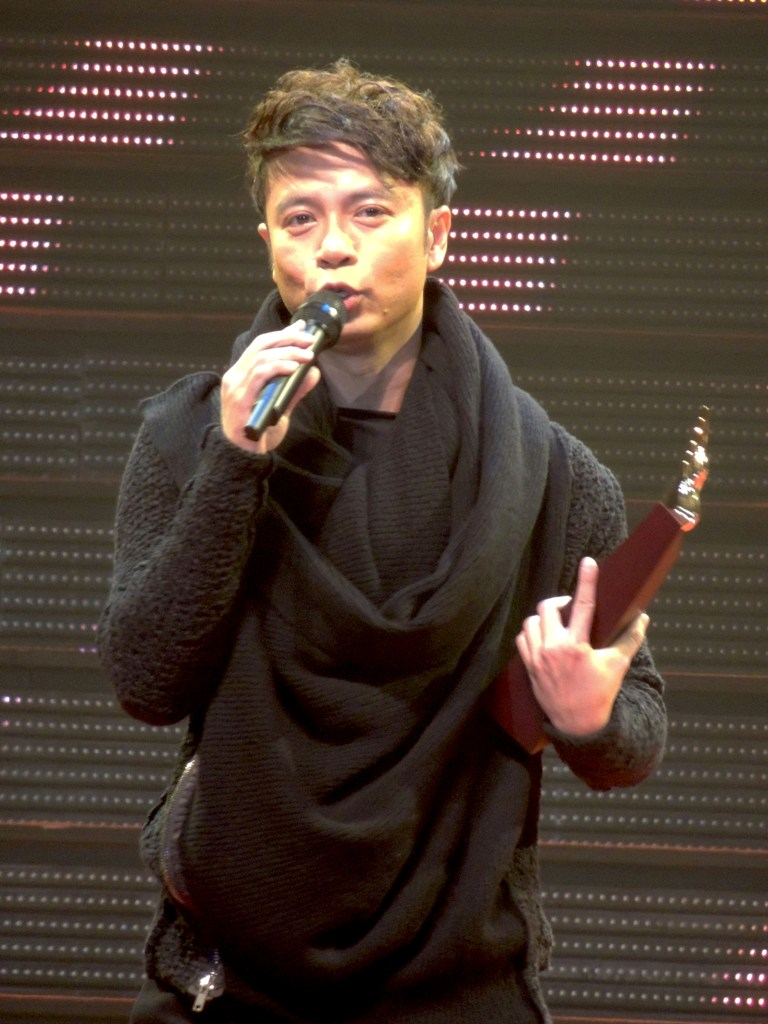
Hacken Lee

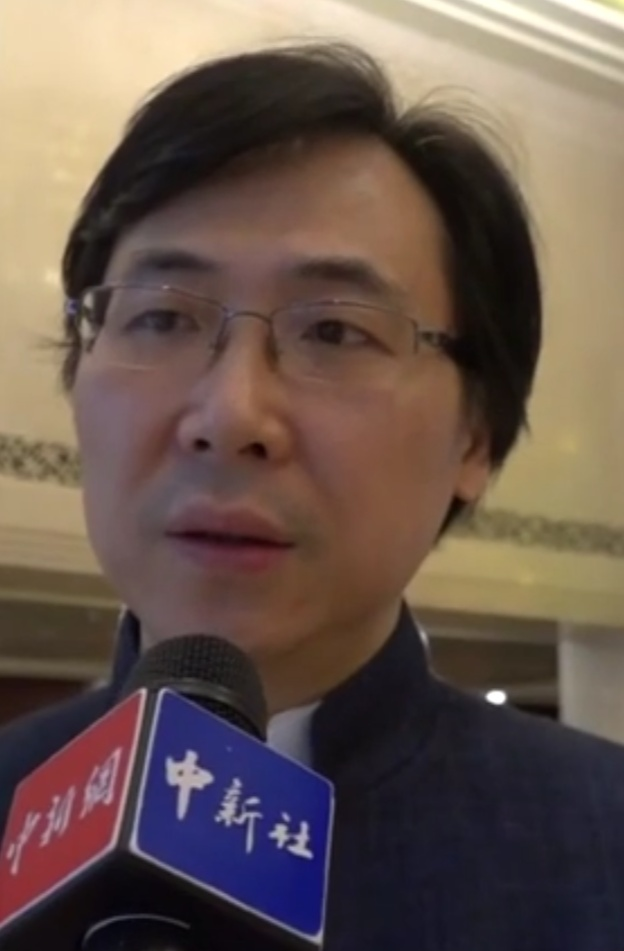
Liao Changyong (blinds - cross battles)

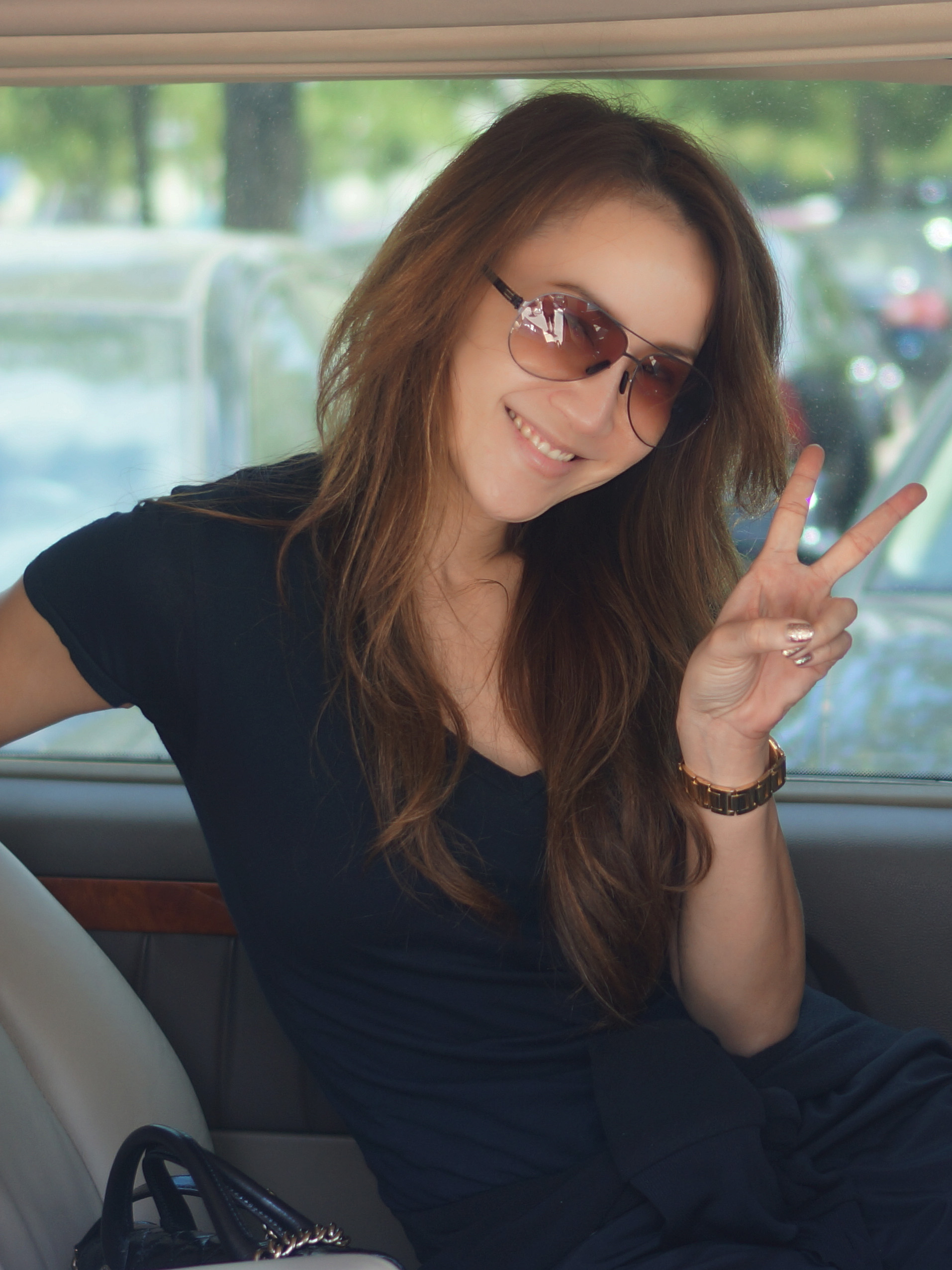
Coco Lee (knockouts - finals)

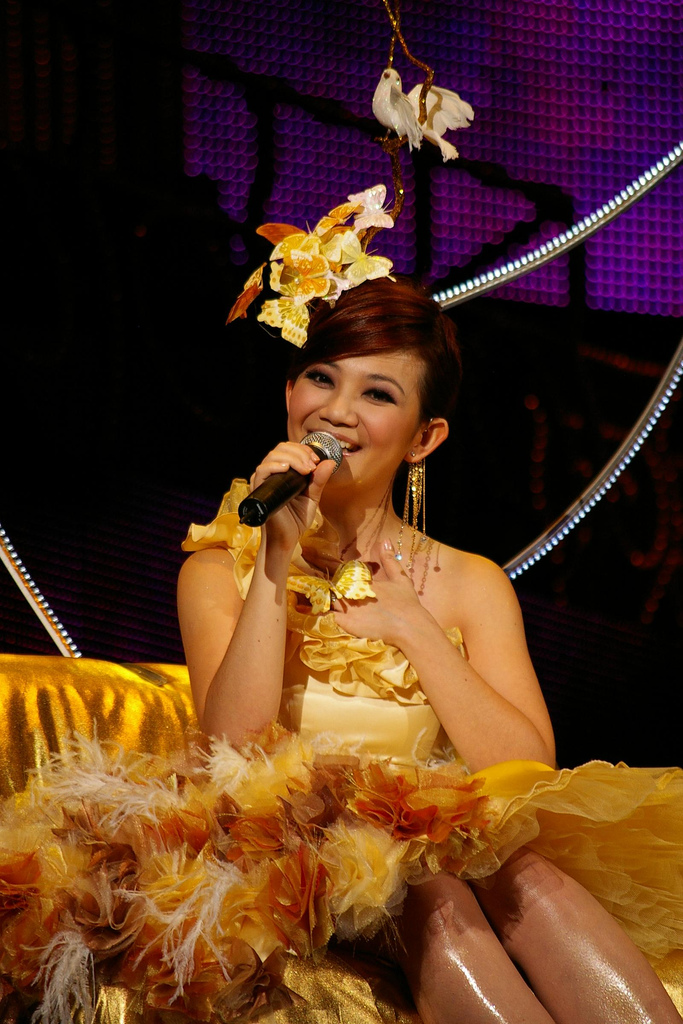
Fish Leong

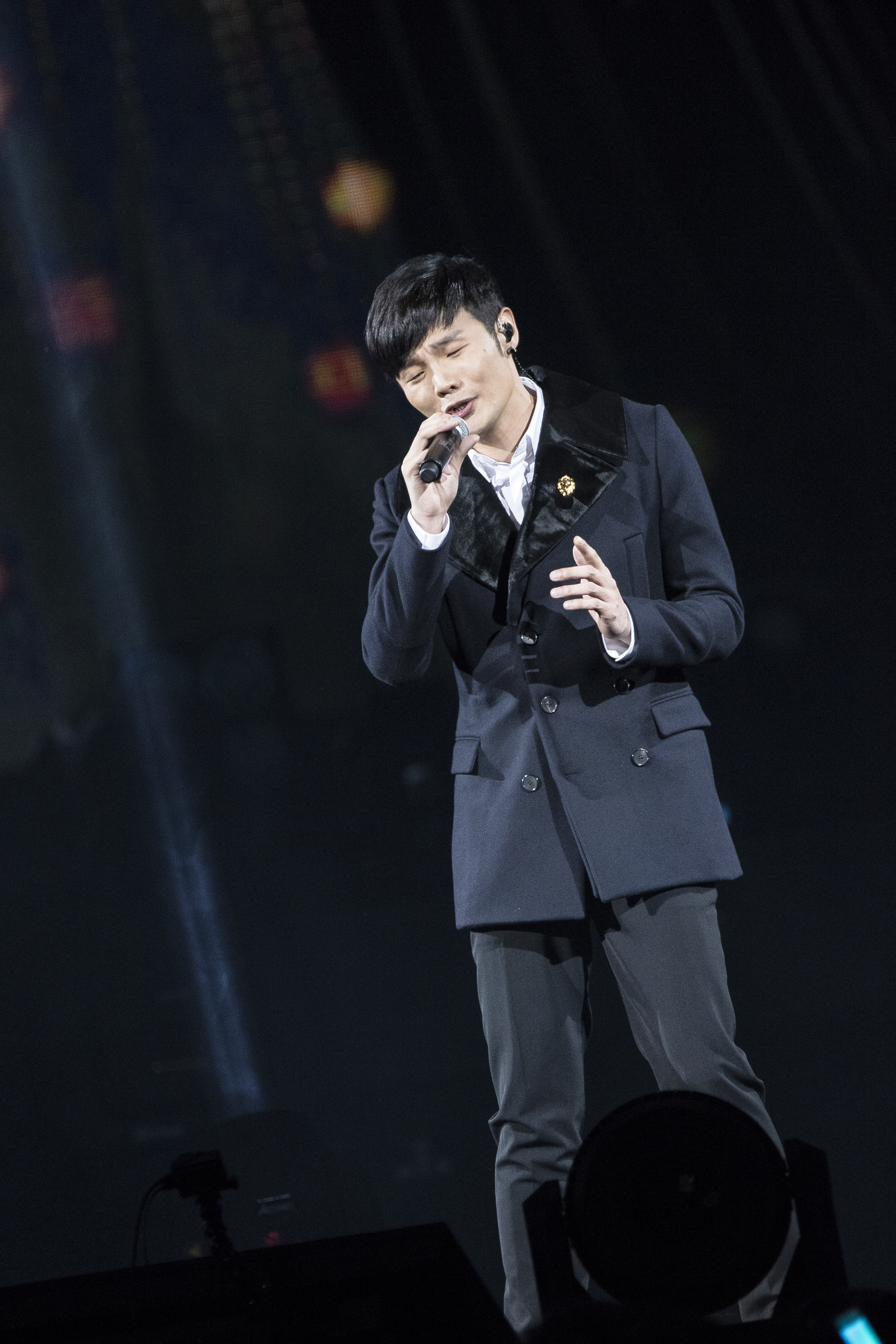
Li Ronghao

== Coco Lee's mistreatment ==
On 28 September 2022, a video clip circulated online on Weibo of Coco Lee yelling at the director of the show's unfair rules shouting out "Why do those with a score of 73 get a second chance, but those with a score of 88.3 don't get a second chance?" in defense of eliminated player Zhou Feige from her team. Some netizens alleged that the show was known to be shady, while others said the production team's desire was to speed up filming due to ongoing delays.

On 17 August 2023, an audio recording purportedly from the late singer commented on being humiliated by the show's production team. According to the clip, she was subjected to a sudden placement change during a performance with Wang Zepeng, a contestant on her team. Wang, who was supposed to accompany Lee on stage to assist her due to her fragile condition from battling illnesses, had his back turned to her, causing Lee to stand alone in seven-inch heels and fall during their duet. She described this experience as "humiliating," especially since her health issues had been largely concealed from the public.

Wang later supported Lee's claims by sharing a screen capture of their private text messages from that time, when Lee accused the director of intentionally undermining her. Other videos showed a staff member attempting to remove Lee from the stage as she repeatedly said, "Don't touch me", and her finally leaving the venue under assistance, struggling to walk.

The clip also mentioned that the production team threatened not to give contestant Feige a chance to return to the competition unless Lee were to write a Weibo post. She complied to ensure Feige had an opportunity to showcase his talent. This controversy led to a significant debate among netizens, with calls to boycott the show's sponsors.

By August 25, 2023, after the audio clip went viral, the stock price of Star China Media, the parent company of "Sing! China," plummeted by more than 50 percent, resulting in a loss of approximately $3 billion in value.

== Teams ==
Colour key

Main Competition

- Winner
- Runner-up
- Third place
- Fourth place
- Fifth place
- Eliminated in the Playoffs
- Eliminated in the Knockout rounds
- Eliminated in the Cross Battle rounds
- Saved by other coaches after losing sing-off in the Blind Auditions
- Eliminated in the Blind Auditions

Comeback Stage

- Eliminated in the Cut

Coaches	Top 37 Artists					
Hacken Lee						
Hacken Lee	Sumi Liang 梁玉莹	Ru Jin 茹今	Yao Yusheng 姚宇笙	Enoch Wang 王以诺	Su Fanjun 苏凡钧	Butterfly 蝶长
Hacken Lee	~~Liu Jiatong 刘珈彤~~	Li Ming 李铭				
Coco Lee (replacing Liao Changyong)						
Coco Lee (replacing Liao Changyong)	Wang Zepeng 王泽鹏	Figo Zhou 周菲戈	Sean Peng 彭忠豪	Kelly Zhong 钟凯琳	Lin Runxin 林润欣	Fan Bentong 范本桐
Coco Lee (replacing Liao Changyong)	~~Fan Bentong 范本桐~~	Liu Jiatong 刘珈彤	Winjay 翁杰	Hanging Radio 懸掛收音機	Jade Rabbit Bomber 玉兔轟炸機	
Fish Leong						
Fish Leong	Pan Yunqi 潘韵淇	Yang Can 杨灿	Burning Dolphins 灼海豚乐队	Xie Tianyu 谢天宇	Hey Dog Band	Dong Mingshuo 董明烁
Fish Leong	~~Fan Bentong 范本桐~~	~~Yao Yusheng 姚宇笙~~	Wang Zi'an 王梓安	Wang Yingjie 王英杰	Wang Zhongzhong 王众众	Zhang Lin 张琳
Li Ronghao						
Li Ronghao	Claire Choi 蔡子伊	Li Chuchu 李楚楚	Zhang Yiwen 张艺雯	Liu Qi 刘琦	Keny Kuang 匡宇	Yang Chun 楊淳
Li Ronghao	~~Su Fanjun 苏凡钧~~	~~Yang Can 杨灿~~	Zhao Jiekang 赵偈康			
Huang Xiaoyun & Curley G (comeback stage)						
Huang Xiaoyun & Curley G (comeback stage)	Tao Leran 陶乐然	Dapan Taozi 大蟠桃紫	Liu Hongzhe 刘洪喆			
Note: Italicized names are stolen artists (names struck through within former teams).

== Blind auditions ==
For the first time in the show's history, there will be two Comeback Stage coaches paired up as a duo, consisting Huang Xiaoyun and Curley G. They function similar to the Comeback Stage from The Voice franchise. These coaches can choose to retrieve any artist that did not earn a chair turn from any of the main coaches. This indicates that they are saved from being eliminated from the blind auditions.

The same mechanics from the blind auditions last season was implemented. The coaches are to recruit a total of six artists to form a team of their own. The forming of the teams would move to a format that is similar to the "Six-Chair Challenge" featured in the British version of The X Factor. Once a team is full with six artists occupying all the spots, the subsequent artists which the coach has successfully recruited would have to face-off with one of the six artists in the sing-offs for a spot in the team.

The incoming artist may select any of the six defending artists to compete against in the sing-off, and both artists would each sing a new song and the coach would decide on the winner. The winner would be given the spot in the team. However, continuing from last season, the losing artist has the chance to be saved by other coaches (the same function as the steals from The Voice). The coaches are given 10 seconds to save the losing artist for elimination. If one coach presses their button, he/she will be automatically on the new coach's team and if more than one coach presses, same as with the blind auditions, the artist has the opportunity to choose which coach they want.

For defending artists, once they have won a sing-off against an incoming artist, they would receive immunity from the subsequent sing-offs and immediately advance to the next round of the competition.

Colour key

✔	Coach pressed their button
	Artist defaulted to this coach's team
	Artist elected to join this coach's team
	Artist eliminated with no coach pressing the button
	Artist was eliminated, but got a second chance in the "Comeback Stage"
	Artist remained on the team after winning sing-off; immune from subsequent sing-offs
	Artist remained on the team after winning sing-off; replaced a defending artist
	Artist saved by other coaches after losing sing-off
	Artist eliminated after losing sing-off

=== Episode 1 (5 August) ===
The show started with the opening performance of Andy Lau performing his song "今天". After his performance, the four coaches then performed each other songs, with Fish Leong performed a medley of Li Ronghao's "我知道是你" and "耳朵", then Li Ronghao performed Fish Leong's "慢冷", Liao Changyong performed Hacken Lee's "月半小夜曲", Hacken Lee performed Liao Changyong's "海戀", and concluded the performance with "上海灘", together with Andy Lau and the comeback stage coaches Huang Xiaoyun and Curley G.

Order	Artist	Age	Hometown	Song	Coach's and artist's choices			
Order	Artist	Age	Hometown	Song	Hacken	Changyong	Fish	Ronghao
1	Claire Choi 蔡子伊	22	Hong Kong	"人间天堂"	✔	✔	✔	✔
2	Liu Qi 刘琦	22	Huludao City, Liaoning	"怎么了"	—	—	✔	✔
3	Xie Tianyu 谢天宇	19	Yichang, Hubei	"崇拜"	✔	✔	✔	—
4	Su Fanjun 苏凡钧	27	Guilin, Guangxi	"可有可无"	✔	—	✔	✔
5	Wang Yingjie 王英杰	33	Jilin, Changchun	"蠢货"	—	✔	✔	—

=== Episode 2 (12 August) ===
Order	Artist	Age	Hometown	Song	Coach's and artist's choices			
Order	Artist	Age	Hometown	Song	Hacken	Changyong	Fish	Ronghao
1	Dong Mingshuo 董明烁	23	Baoding, Hebei	"如果我们当时一起会怎么往"	—	—	✔	—
2	Wang Zi'an 王梓安	23	Qingzhou, Guangxi	"恒温"	—	—	✔	—
3	Zhang Lin 张琳	19	Guangdong	"木槿花"	—	—	✔	—
4	Butterfly 蝶长	38	Guizhou	"铜芯钥匙"	✔	—	—	—
5	Tao Leran 陶乐然	29	Shanghai	"心世纪"	—	—	—	—
6	Sumi Liang 梁玉莹	26	Guangxi	"十年如烟"	✔	✔	✔	✔
7	Hey Dog Band	—	Shenzhen, Guangdong	"巷"	—	✔	✔	—
8	Li Chuchu 李楚楚	23	Quanzhou	"同类"	—	—	✔	✔
9	Sean Peng 彭忠豪	31	Deyang, Sichuan	"台北车站"	—	✔	✔	✔
10	Pan Yunqi 潘韵淇	18	Changsha, Hunan	"作者"	—	—	✔	—

=== Episode 3 (19 August) ===
Order	Artist	Age	Hometown	Song	Coach's and artist's choices			
Order	Artist	Age	Hometown	Song	Hacken	Changyong	Fish	Ronghao
1	Winjay 翁杰	20	Fujian, Fuzhou	"Rain Down"	—	✔	—	—
2	Figo Zhou 周菲戈	20	Jiangshan, Zhejiang	"衣柜歌手"	✔	✔	—	—
3	Kelly Zhong 钟凯琳	28	—	"照旧"	—	✔	—	—
4	Wang Zepeng 王泽鹏	22	Zhejiang	"请告诉他还有海"	—	✔	✔	—
5	Dapan Taozi 大蟠桃紫	22	Japan	"不舍"	—	—	—	—
6	Lin Runxin 林润欣	19	Shanghai	"梦游"	—	✔	—	—
7	Keny Kuang 匡宇	23	Duyun, Guizhou	"不要再说了"	—	—	—	✔
8	Fan Bentong 范本桐	23	Longkou, Shandong	"Bridge Over Troubled Water"	—	✔	—	—
9	Yang Can 杨灿	23	Qionglai City, Sichuan	"一起"	—	—	✔	✔
10	Zhao Jiekang 赵偈康	22	Anhui	"填词"	—	—	—	✔

=== Episode 4 (26 August) ===
Order	Artist	Age	Hometown	Song	Coach's and artist's choices			
Order	Artist	Age	Hometown	Song	Hacken	Changyong	Fish	Ronghao
1	Liu Hongzhe 刘洪喆	30	Anshan, Liaoning	"他"	—	—	—	—
2	Liu Jiatong 刘珈彤	20	Anqiu, Shandong	"来，你说"	✔	—	—	—
3	Enuo Wang 王以诺	24	Shantou, Guangdong	"红头船"	✔	✔	—	—
4	Ru Jin 茹今	21	Shaoxing, Zhejiang	"Last Animals"	✔	—	✔	—
5	Zhang Yiwen 张艺雯	26	Yuncheng, Shanxi	"绒绒"	—	—	—	✔
6	Yao Yusheng 姚宇笙	24	Haifeng County, Guangdong	"可惜爱"	✔	✔	✔	—

=== Episode 5 (2 September) ===
Order	Artist	Age	Hometown	Song	Coach's and artist's choices			
Order	Artist	Age	Hometown	Song	Hacken	Changyong	Fish	Ronghao
1	Burning Dolphins 灼海豚乐队	—	—	"遥远的人"	—	—	✔	✔
2	Wang Zhongzhong 王众众	23	Rizhao, Shandong	"与浪之间"	—	—	✔	—
3	Li Ming 李铭	26	Ningde, Fujian	"你不要担心"	✔	—	—	—

=== Episode 6 (9 September) ===
Order	Artist	Age	Hometown	Song	Coach's and artist's choices			
Order	Artist	Age	Hometown	Song	Hacken	Changyong	Fish	Ronghao
1	Feng Chen Sinan 刘洪喆	22	Ningbo, Zhejiang	"小心翻閱"	—	—	—	—
2	Zhao Di 趙迪	22	Beijing	"燼"	—	—	—	—
3	Huang Kai 黃愷	33	Changsha, Hunan Province	"普通的夜"	—	—	—	—
4	Wen Yixin 溫奕心	34	Xi'an, Shaanxi	"其實都沒有"	—	—	—	—
5	Wang Ming 王茗	24	Jiangxi Shanglu	"我陪你熬過了苦"		—	—	—
6	Yang Chun 楊淳	26	Quanzhou, Fujian	"浪花"	—	—	—	✔
7	Hanging Radio 懸掛收音機	26/26	Chongqing, Sichuan	"浪花"	—	✔	—	—
8	Jade Rabbit Bomber 玉兔轟炸機	—	—	"上九霄"	—	✔	—	—

=== Sing-off details ===
Episode	Order	Song	Incoming artist	Defending artist	Song	Final 6 replacement chart					
Episode	Order	Song	Incoming artist	Defending artist	Song	1	2	3	4	5	6
Team Hacken
First six defending artists						Butterfly 蝶长	Sumi Liang 梁玉莹	Liu Jiatong 刘珈彤	Enuo Wang 王以诺	Ru Jin 茹今	Su Fanjun 苏凡钧
4	1	"赌局"	Yao Yusheng 姚宇笙	Liu Jiatong 刘珈彤 (saved by Changyong)	"夜晚出生的小孩"	Butterfly 蝶长	Sumi Liang 梁玉莹	Yao Yusheng 姚宇笙	Enuo Wang 王以诺	Ru Jin 茹今	Su Fanjun 苏凡钧
5	2	"北极星的眼泪"	Li Ming 李铭	Ru Jin 茹今	"那么一点"	Butterfly 蝶长	Sumi Liang 梁玉莹	Yao Yusheng 姚宇笙	Enuo Wang 王以诺	Ru Jin 茹今	Su Fanjun 苏凡钧
Team Changyong
First six defending artists						Sean Peng 彭忠豪	Winjay 翁杰	Figo Zhou 周菲戈	Kelly Zhong 钟凯琳	Wang Zepeng 王泽鹏	Lin Runxin 林润欣
3	1	"我们"	Fan Bentong 范本桐 (saved by Fish)	Sean Peng 彭忠豪	"天黑黑"	Sean Peng 彭忠豪	Winjay 翁杰	Figo Zhou 周菲戈	Kelly Zhong 钟凯琳	Wang Zepeng 王泽鹏	Lin Runxin 林润欣
5	2	"所幸"	Liu Jiatong 刘珈彤	Lin Runxin 林润欣	"最幸运的人"	Sean Peng 彭忠豪	Winjay 翁杰	Figo Zhou 周菲戈	Kelly Zhong 钟凯琳	Wang Zepeng 王泽鹏	Lin Runxin 林润欣
5	3	"没有你"	Fan Bentong 范本桐	Winjay 翁杰	"摇啊摇"	Sean Peng 彭忠豪	Fan Bentong 范本桐	Figo Zhou 周菲戈	Kelly Zhong 钟凯琳	Wang Zepeng 王泽鹏	Lin Runxin 林润欣
6	4	"蘇老師"	Hanging Radio 懸掛收音機	Fan Bentong 范本桐	Lay Me Down	Sean Peng 彭忠豪	Fan Bentong 范本桐	Figo Zhou 周菲戈	Kelly Zhong 钟凯琳	Wang Zepeng 王泽鹏	Lin Runxin 林润欣
6	5	"紅塵白刃"	Jade Rabbit Bomber 玉兔轟炸機	Wang Zepeng 王泽鹏	"Beautiful tonight"	Sean Peng 彭忠豪	Fan Bentong 范本桐	Figo Zhou 周菲戈	Kelly Zhong 钟凯琳	Wang Zepeng 王泽鹏	Lin Runxin 林润欣
Team Fish
First six defending artists						Xie Tianyu 谢天宇	Wang Yingjie 王英杰	Dong Mingshuo 董明烁	Wang Zi'an 王梓安	Zhang Lin 张琳	Hey Dog Band
2	1	"深深 (Love you deeply)"	Pan Yunqi 潘韵淇	Wang Yingjie 王英杰	"我这个人"	Xie Tianyu 谢天宇	Pan Yunqi 潘韵淇	Dong Mingshuo 董明烁	Wang Zi'an 王梓安	Zhang Lin 张琳	Hey Dog Band
3	2	"走钢索的人"	Fan Bentong 范本桐	Wang Zi'an 王梓安	"窃笑"	Xie Tianyu 谢天宇	Pan Yunqi 潘韵淇	Dong Mingshuo 董明烁	~~Fan Bentong 范本桐~~	Zhang Lin 张琳	Hey Dog Band
4	3	"长镜头"	Yao Yusheng 姚宇笙 (saved by Hacken)	Dong Mingshuo 董明烁	"红烧狮子头"	Xie Tianyu 谢天宇	Pan Yunqi 潘韵淇	Dong Mingshuo 董明烁	~~Fan Bentong 范本桐~~	Zhang Lin 张琳	Hey Dog Band
5	4	"自由的笨蛋"	Burning Dolphins 灼海豚乐队	Fan Bentong 范本桐 (saved by Changyong)	"情歌"	Xie Tianyu 谢天宇	Pan Yunqi 潘韵淇	Dong Mingshuo 董明烁	Burning Dolphins 灼海豚乐队	Zhang Lin 张琳	Hey Dog Band
5	5	"天天"	Wang Zhongzhong 王众众	Pan Yunqi 潘韵淇	"无妨"	Xie Tianyu 谢天宇	Pan Yunqi 潘韵淇	Dong Mingshuo 董明烁	Burning Dolphins 灼海豚乐队	Zhang Lin 张琳	Hey Dog Band
6	6	"浪費時間"	Yang Can 杨灿	Zhang Lin 張琳	等	Xie Tianyu 谢天宇	Pan Yunqi 潘韵淇	Dong Mingshuo 董明烁	Burning Dolphins 灼海豚乐队	Yang Can 楊淳	Hey Dog Band
Team Ronghao
First six defending artists						Claire Choi 蔡子伊	Liu Qi 刘琦	~~Su Fanjun~~; ~~苏凡钧~~	Li Chuchu 李楚楚	Keny Kuang 匡宇	~~Yang Can 杨灿~~
3	1	"剪了头发"	Zhao Jiekang 赵偈康	Liu Qi 刘琦	"一口"	Claire Choi 蔡子伊	Liu Qi 刘琦	~~Su Fanjun~~; ~~苏凡钧~~	Li Chuchu 李楚楚	Keny Kuang 匡宇	~~Yang Can 杨灿~~
4	2	"门"	Zhang Yiwen 张艺雯	Su Fanjun 苏凡钧 (saved by Hacken)	"潜伏期"	Claire Choi 蔡子伊	Liu Qi 刘琦	Zhang Yiwen 张艺雯	Li Chuchu 李楚楚	Keny Kuang 匡宇	~~Yang Can 杨灿~~
6	2	"戀愛困難少女"	Yang Chun 楊淳	Yang Can 杨灿 (saved by Fish)	Enjoy your life	Claire Choi 蔡子伊	Liu Qi 刘琦	Zhang Yiwen 张艺雯	Li Chuchu 李楚楚	Keny Kuang 匡宇	Yang Chun 楊淳

=== Comeback Stage: The Cut ===
Artists that did not earn a chair turn in the blind auditions can participate in the Comeback Stage if the Comeback Stage coaches press their button. These artists will have to battle it out in a round called The Cut. They may select a successfully recruited artist to sing against. However, they are only allowed to choose artists that received a single chair turn.

The coaches then choose who is the winner of the battle. The comeback stage coaches' votes will be counted as one. Artists need to garner at least three votes from the coaches to win the battle. For artists that are already on a coach's team, if they win, they would receive immunity and cannot be chosen in any subsequent Cut rounds.

Colour key

Comeback Stage Artist
Artist won the Cut
Artist lost the Cut and was eliminated

Episode	Order	Song	Artists		Song	Coaches' Pick				
Episode	Order	Song	Winner	Loser	Song	Hacken	Changyong	Fish	Ronghao	Xiaoyun & Curley G
Episode 2 (12 August)	1	"趁她好时光"	Butterfly 蝶长	Tao Leran 陶乐然	"Urban Legend (都会传奇)"	Butterfly	Butterfly	Butterfly	Butterfly	Leran
Episode 3 (19 August)	2	"依赖"	Dong Mingshuo 董明烁	Dapan Taozi 大蟠桃紫	"喜欢你"	Mingshuo	Taozi	Mingshuo	Mingshuo	Taozi
Episode 4 (26 August)	3	"鄙人"	Zhang Lin 张琳	Liu Hongzhe 刘洪喆	"光亮"	Lin	Lin	Lin	Lin	Hongzhe

== The Cross Battles ==
In this round, coaches will go head-to-head against each other in groups of two. Artists from these respective teams will compete each other in six rounds to decide a winner. After each round of two groups of students singing, a jury of 49 experts (30 domestic Chinese music producers, as well as media elites and radio hosts) voted, and the two coaches not participated in the cross battle each selected the winner and had 1 vote each. The winning artist will receive one point for their team while the other artist will not receive any points. However, coaches may choose one artist on their team to give them an opportunity to earn a bonus point. If that artist wins, they will receive two points for their team; otherwise, the artist will not receive any points.

This season, the rules were slightly changed compared to 2021 season. Instead of coaches selecting their artists at the same time, coaches selected them in turns. After one coach have made up his mind, the other coach has 1 minute to select a member of his team to fight. The first nominating coach was elected after drawing the lots. The team who won the Battle have to nominate first in the next Round.

At the end of the episode, the team that achieved a lower score will have to eliminate one artist from their team as a penalty.

After the end of the cross battle, Liao Changyong withdrew from the program for personal reasons, and was replaced by Coco Lee. With Coco Lee's replacement as coach, this is the first time in the history of Sing! China to have two female coaches in the panel.

Colour key

	Artist won the Cross Battle (one or two points allocated to the team)
	Artist lost the Cross Battle (no points allocated to the team)
✔	Artist received Bonus Points
✘	Artist was eliminated by coach

=== Episode 7 (16 September) ===
Order	Challenger			Result		Challenged		
Order	Coach	Song	Artist	Result		Artist	Song	Coach
1	Fish Leong	"真实"	Xie Tianyu 谢天宇	21	30	Su Fanjun 苏凡钧	"我的美丽"	Hacken Lee
2	Hacken Lee	"我想你了"	Sumi Liang 梁玉莹	20	31	Hey Dog Band	"迟吾行"	Fish Leong
3	Fish Leong	"小镇姑娘"	Dong Mingshuo 董明烁 ✘	12	39	Yao Yusheng 姚宇笙 ✔	"你是我最深爱的人"	Hacken Lee
4	Hacken Lee	"一生所爱"	Butterfly 蝶长	25	26	Yang Can 杨灿 ✔	"回不去的夏天"	Fish Leong
5	Fish Leong	"我也很想他"	Pan Yunqi 潘韵淇	22	29	Ru Jin 茹今	"你是不是误会什么miss understanding"	Hacken Lee
6	Hacken Lee	"到底怎么跟你说"	Enuo Wang 王以诺	17	34	Burning Dolphins 灼海豚乐队	"独白"	Fish Leong

Winning team	Result		Losing team	Eliminated Artist
Hacken Lee	4 (160)	4 (146)	Fish Leong	Dong Mingshuo 董明烁

=== Episode 8 (23 September) ===
Order	Challenger			Result		Challenged		
Order	Coach	Song	Artist	Result		Artist	Song	Coach
1	Liao Changyong	"真实"	Fan Bentong 范本桐 ✘	20	31	Yang Chun 楊淳 ✔	"彼个所在"	Li Ronghao
2	Li Ronghao	"请为我开一扇窗"	Li Chuchu 李楚楚	9	42	Wang Zepeng 王泽鹏 ✔	"后来我又找过你"	Liao Changyong
3	Liao Changyong	"Hunting Game 追"	Kelly Zhong 钟凯琳	24	27	Keny Kuang 匡宇	"就这样"	Li Ronghao
4	Li Ronghao	"说走就走"	Liu Qi 刘琦	0	51	Figo Zhou 周菲戈	"Simon"	Liao Changyong
5	Liao Changyong	Speechless	Lin Runxin 林润欣	17	34	Claire Choi 蔡子伊	"敬长大"	Li Ronghao
6	Li Ronghao	"蝇"	Zhang Yiwen 张艺雯	26	25	Sean Peng 彭忠豪	"浓缩蓝鲸"	Liao Changyong

Winning team	Result		Losing team	Eliminated Artist
Team Ronghao	5	3	Team Changyong	Fan Bentong 范本桐

== Knockouts ==
Knockouts is the next round after the Cross Battles. Compared to last season's Cross Knockouts, artists will fight against the people from the same team, instead of against other teams. Before each knockout, coach selects one artist from his team, who will have randomly assigned opponent. After each group of students sings, their coach will assign 51 points, while the jury will assign 50 points. From each group the contestant with more points will advance to the next round, while the other will be eliminated. The remaining two artists from Fish Leong's team and Coco Lee's team, that were not drawn, will face off head-to-head for the last spot in the next round.

Colour key

Artist won the Knockout and advanced to the Playoffs
Artist lost the Knockout and was eliminated

=== Episode 9 (30 September) ===
Order	Coach	Artist	Song	Panel votes	Coach votes	Total votes	Result
1	Li Ronghao	Yang Chun 楊淳	"浴室"	12	22	34	Eliminate
1	Li Ronghao	Claire Choi 蔡子伊	"七百年后"	38	29	67	Advanced
2	Li Ronghao	Li Chuchu 李楚楚	"照单全收"	30	23	53	Advanced
2	Li Ronghao	Liu Qi 刘琦	"情话love words"	20	28	48	Eliminated
3	Li Ronghao	Zhang Yiwen 张艺雯	"禁区"	37	26	63	Advanced
3	Li Ronghao	Keny Kuang 匡宇	"浪费"	13	25	38	Eliminated
4	Hacken Lee	Butterfly 蝶长	"怎么能放下"	28	22	50	Eliminated
4	Hacken Lee	Yao Yusheng 姚宇笙	"心如刀割"	22	29	51	Advanced

=== Episode 10 (3 October) ===
Order	Coach	Artist	Song	Panel votes	Coach votes	Total votes	Result
1	Hacken Lee	Enuo Wang 王以诺	"生来就是这样的人"	18	21	39	Eliminated
1	Hacken Lee	Sumi Liang 梁玉莹	"墙角"	32	30	62	Advanced
2	Hacken Lee	Su Fanjun 苏凡钧	"唯一"	22	25	47	Eliminated
2	Hacken Lee	Ru Jin 茹今	"影帝"	28	26	54	Advanced
3	Fish Leong	Hey Dog Band	"逐日"	13	24	37	Eliminated
3	Fish Leong	Burning Dolphins 灼海豚乐队	"拥抱你"	37	27	64	Advanced
4	Fish Leong	Xie Tianyu 谢天宇	"黑色柳丁"	10	22	32	Eliminated
4	Fish Leong	Yang Can 杨灿	"流星"	40	29	69	Advanced
5	Coco Lee	Kelly Zhong 钟凯琳	"原来你是个"	4	24	28	Eliminated
5	Coco Lee	Figo Zhou 周菲戈	"我不相信"	46	27	73	Advanced
6	Coco Lee	Sean Peng 彭仲豪	"贝加尔湖畔"	3	25	28	Eliminated
6	Coco Lee	Wang Zepeng 王泽鹏	"给时间一把椅子"	47	26	73	Advanced
7	Coco Lee	Lin Runxin 林润欣	"是他不配"	11	N/A	11	Eliminated
7	Fish Leong	Pan Yunqi 潘韵淇	"念念"	39	N/A	39	Advanced

== Playoffs ==
The Top 11 will perform in the Playoffs for spot in the final. Playoffs are divided into 2 rounds.

In the first round, the remaining artists compete against their fellow team members for a spot in the final. In deciding who moves on, their coach; as well as the studio audience made up of 300 members of the public were given an equal say. Each of the public voters was entitled to one vote per artist, and they can either choose to vote or not vote for a particular artist. The maximum score that the student will receive of their coach is 50, and 50 for the live audience. Artist that will score the most points in each team will advance directly to the final. Remaining artists will perform in round 2.

In the second round, the remaining 7 artists will perform again for the final spot in the final. In this round, only audience will be allowed to vote and artist with the most votes will advance to the final.

With the eliminations of Yao Yusheng 姚宇笙 and Yang Can 杨灿, this is the first time since the implementation of the steals in Season 5 that no stolen artists advanced to the finale.

Colour key

Artist received the highest score in their team and advanced to the final
Artist received the most votes from public and advanced to the final
Artist did not receive the highest score in their team and was left to perform in Round 2
Artist was eliminated

=== Episode 11 (5 October) ===
Round 1
Order	Coach	Artist	Song	Coach points	Public points	Total points	Result
1	Hacken Lee	Yao Yusheng 姚宇笙	"与生俱来"	36	35.8	71.8	Round 2
2	Hacken Lee	Sumi Liang 梁玉莹	"美丽之最"	48	44.7	92.7	Advanced
3	Hacken Lee	Ru Jin 茹今	"我想要的快乐"	39	38.3	77.3	Round 2
4	Fish Leong	Burning Dolphins 灼海豚乐队	"是她"	41	38.2	79.2	Round 2
5	Fish Leong	Pan Yunqi 潘韵淇	"爱"	49	41.2	90.2	Advanced
6	Fish Leong	Yang Can 杨灿	"不用告诉我"	40	38.8	78.8	Round 2
7	Coco Lee	Wang Zepeng 王泽鹏	"半成品"	49	41.5	90.5	Advanced
8	Coco Lee	Figo Zhou 周菲戈	"她"	49	39.3	88.3	Round 2

=== Episode 12 (7 October) ===
Round 1
Order	Coach	Artist	Song	Coach points	Public points	Total points	Result
1	Li Ronghao	Li Chuchu 李楚楚	"Beautiful Love"	36	40.2	76	Round 2
2	Li Ronghao	Claire Choi 蔡子伊	"道听涂说"	49	44.3	93.3	Advanced
3	Li Ronghao	Zhang Yiwen 张艺雯	"流浪的红舞鞋"	44	39.2	83.2	Round 2
Round 2
Order	Coach	Artist	Song	Public votes			Result
1	Li Ronghao	Zhang Yiwen 张艺雯	"心里学"	203			Eliminated
2	Hacken Lee	Ru Jin 茹今	"火烧的寂寞"	231			Eliminated
3	Fish Leong	Burning Dolphins 灼海豚乐队	"飞鱼"	220			Eliminated
4	Hacken Lee	Yao Yusheng 姚宇笙	"短发" + "剪爱"	229			Eliminated
5	Li Ronghao	Li Chuchu 李楚楚	"可笑的事"	268			Advanced
6	Fish Leong	Yang Can 杨灿	"Say bye"	248			Eliminated
7	Coco Lee	Figo Zhou 周菲戈	"拆穿"	244			Eliminated

== The Finals ==
The final round was recorded on October 14, but premiered on October 28.

There were two rounds in the final: duet with their coach and a solo song. Participants take turns turning on and off polling channels. Through each round of singing, 51 mass jury votes, each with a maximum of 10 points. The points gathered by the artists in the two rounds will be added up, and the top 2 highest-voted artists will then proceed to the next round, while the other 3 will be eliminated.

In the final stage, there was only one round of solo singing. After the two groups of students sang, 51 members of the public jury and 25 members of the panel voted. Public votes will have 1 vote each, weighing 1 point per vote; panel votes will have 1 vote each, weighing 2 points per vote.

=== Episode 13 (October 28) ===
Coach	Artist	Round 1					Final Showdown					Result
Coach	Artist	Order	Duet song (with coach)	Order	Solo song	Public votes	Order	Winner's song	Panel votes (points)	Public points	Total points	Result
Coco Lee	Wang Zepeng 王泽鹏	1	"永不失聯的愛"	6	"他她回憶錄"	738	N/A (already eliminated)					Fourth Place
Fish Leong	Pan Yunqi 潘韵淇	2	"無條件為你"	5	"摯友"	762	N/A (already eliminated)					Third Place
Li Ronghao	Claire Choi 蔡子伊	3	"北斗星"	7	"一人之境"	806	10	"言不由衷"	20	22	44	Runner-up
Li Ronghao	Li Chuchu 李楚楚	3	"北斗星"	8	"如果你愛我"	722	N/A (already eliminated)					Fifth Place
Hacken Lee	Sumi Liang 梁玉莹	4	"飛花"	9	"飄雪"	811	11	"祝君好"	30	29	59	Winner
