= Shan Yichun =

Chinese singer-songwriter

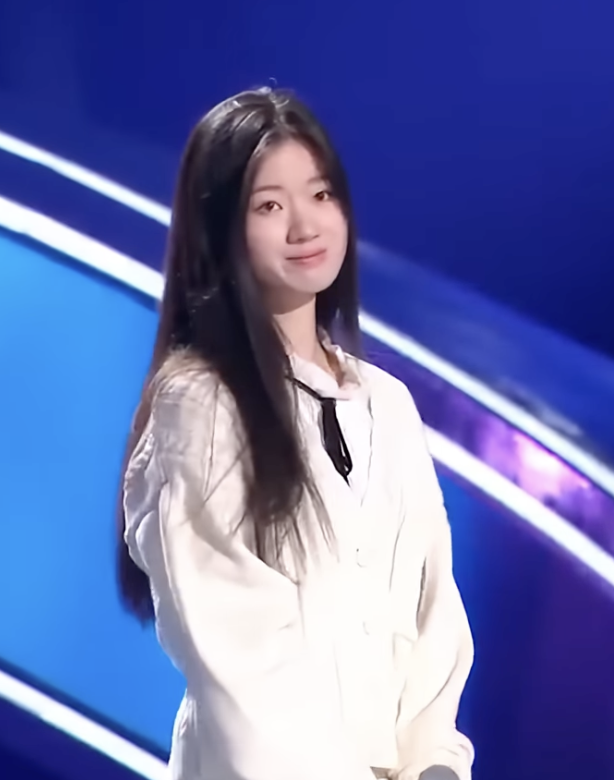
- Born: 23 December 2001 (age 24); Dongyang, Jinhua, Zhejiang, China
- Education: Zhejiang Conservatory of Music
- Occupations: Singer-songwriter; actress
- Musical career
- Genres: Mandopop; Ballad; R&B
- Instrument: Vocals
- Years active: 2020–present
- Label: By Moon Entertainment

Chinese name
- Traditional Chinese: 單依純
- Simplified Chinese: 单依纯
- Hanyu Pinyin: Shàn Yīchún
- Jyutping: Sin6 Ji1seon4

Shan Yichun (Chinese: 单依纯, born 23 December 2001) is a Chinese singer-songwriter. Noted for winning season 5 of Chinese reality talent show Sing! China, Shan released her debut album, Courage, in 2022 and hosted her inaugural solo concert Please Me in 2023.

== Experience ==
In 2025 her song "Chun Mei Mei" (Lil Sis) was nominated for Production of the Year at the 3rd Wave Music Awards. In May, she participated in the variety show Singer（2025） and ultimately won third place. In December, she established her personal studio. In 2026, she was nominated for Best Mandarin Female Singer at the 37th Golden Melody Awards. On August 16, her work "Zhu Yu" (Jade) won the Top Ten Golden Songs of the Year at the 7th TMEA .

== Awards and honors ==
In 2026 Shan was named to Forbes 30 Under 30 Asia in the Entertainment and Sports category, becoming the only female singer from mainland China to be included that year. Forbes highlighted her as "the youngest winner of China's leading singing competition, The Voice of China, in 2020 at the age of 18" and noted she has more than 400,000 followers on Instagram. The list featured approximately 300 honorees selected from nearly 4,000 candidates across 18 Asia-Pacific countries and territories, with only 46 individuals from China making the cut.

Also in 2026 Shan was included in The Business of Fashion's BoF 500 Class of 2026. She was the only solo female singer worldwide to be included in that year's list, the second Chinese solo female singer ever to be featured (after Li Yuchun), and the first Chinese Gen Z solo artist to receive the honor.

== Brand partnership details ==
=== Chanel ===
Officially announced on January 12, 2026, becoming the first post-2000s Chinese singer brand ambassador in the brand's history. The partnership began in 2023; she previously attended the Spring/Summer 2025 ready-to-wear show at the Grand Palais in Paris and the Métiers d'Art 2024/25 show held by West Lake in Hangzhou. Simultaneously featured on the inaugural cover of VOGUE MUSIC, a new music magazine IP under Vogue China.

=== COACH ===
Officially announced on February 26, 2026, as COACH Global Brand Ambassador. Featured alongside Oscar-nominated actress Elle Fanning, Korean singer-songwriter SOYEON, Japanese singer-songwriter Lilas, Emmy-winning actress Storm Reid, and WNBA Rookie of the Year Paige Bueckers in the global campaign. Starred in a campaign film portraying a girl discovering her true self in a library, echoing the brand's new book-shaped bag charm.

=== Victoria's Secret ===
Officially announced on March 20, 2026, as China Brand Ambassador. Launched the "Summer Edit" campaign, showcasing lingerie, sleepwear, and loungewear pieces. This marks her third luxury brand partnership in three consecutive months following Chanel and COACH, further solidifying her commercial value and fashion influence as a new-generation female singer.

== Discography ==
Studio Albums

- Courage (2022)
- Lil Sis (2025)

== Filmography ==
=== Film ===
Year	English title	Original title	Role	Notes	Ref.
2022	New Five Golden Flowers	你是我的一束光	Music teacher	Cameo	

=== Television shows ===
Year	Title	Network	Role	Notes	Ref.
2020	Sing! China	Zhejiang Television	Contestant	Winner	
2021	The Treasured Voice	Zhejiang Television	Contestant		
2021	Praise the Program	Zhejiang Television	Contestant		
2021	Rap Star	Mango TV	Contestant		
2021	STAGE BOOM	IQIYI	Contestant		
2021	Singing With Legends	Dragon Television	Contestant		
2022	Infinity and Beyond	Mango TV, TVB	Contestant		
2023	Ring A Bell	Youku	Contestant		
2024	Melody Journey	Jiangsu Satellite TV, IQIYI	Contestant		
2025	Singer 2025	Hunan Television, Mango TV	Contestant	3rd place	
