= Sing! China season 5 =

Sing! China
- Season 5
- Hosted by: Hu Qiaohua; Yi Yi (backstage)
- Coaches: Li Jian; Nicholas Tse; Li Ronghao; Li Yuchun
- Winner: Shan Yichun 单依纯
- Winning coach: Li Jian
- Runner-up: Zebra Forest 斑马森林

Release
- Original network: Zhejiang Television
- Original release: 21 August – 21 November 2020

Season chronology
- ← Previous; Season 4 Next → Season 6

The fifth season of the Chinese reality talent show Sing! China premiered on 21 August 2020, on Zhejiang Television. Li Ronghao was the only coach returning from the previous season. Meanwhile, Li Jian and Nicholas Tse also returned after their one-season hiatus, replacing Harlem Yu and Wang Leehom. Li Yuchun joined the coaching panel as a new coach, replacing Na Ying.

On 21 November 2020, Shan Yichun was announced the winner of the season, making her youngest winner. In addition, with Li Jian's second win, he became the first coach to win multiple seasons. Zebra Forest from Team Li Ronghao was the runner-up. Hence, this is the first time in the history of Sing! China where a finalist is a stolen artist whom their coach did not originally turn for in the blind auditions. Pan Hong, Cao Yang and Su Yuning finished third, fourth and fifth places respectively.

With Harlem Yu's departure as a coach, the fifth season is the first not to feature any coaches from the inaugural season.

== Coaches and hosts ==
On 28 July 2020, it was announced that Nicholas Tse would be returning as a coach after a one-season hiatus. A few days later, on 31 July 2020, it was confirmed that Li Ronghao would be returning as a coach, along with Li Jian who returned after a one-season hiatus. On 18 August 2020, it was announced that Li Yuchun would be joining the trio as a new coach. Hu Qiaohua returned as a host for the season.

Sing! China season 5 coaches

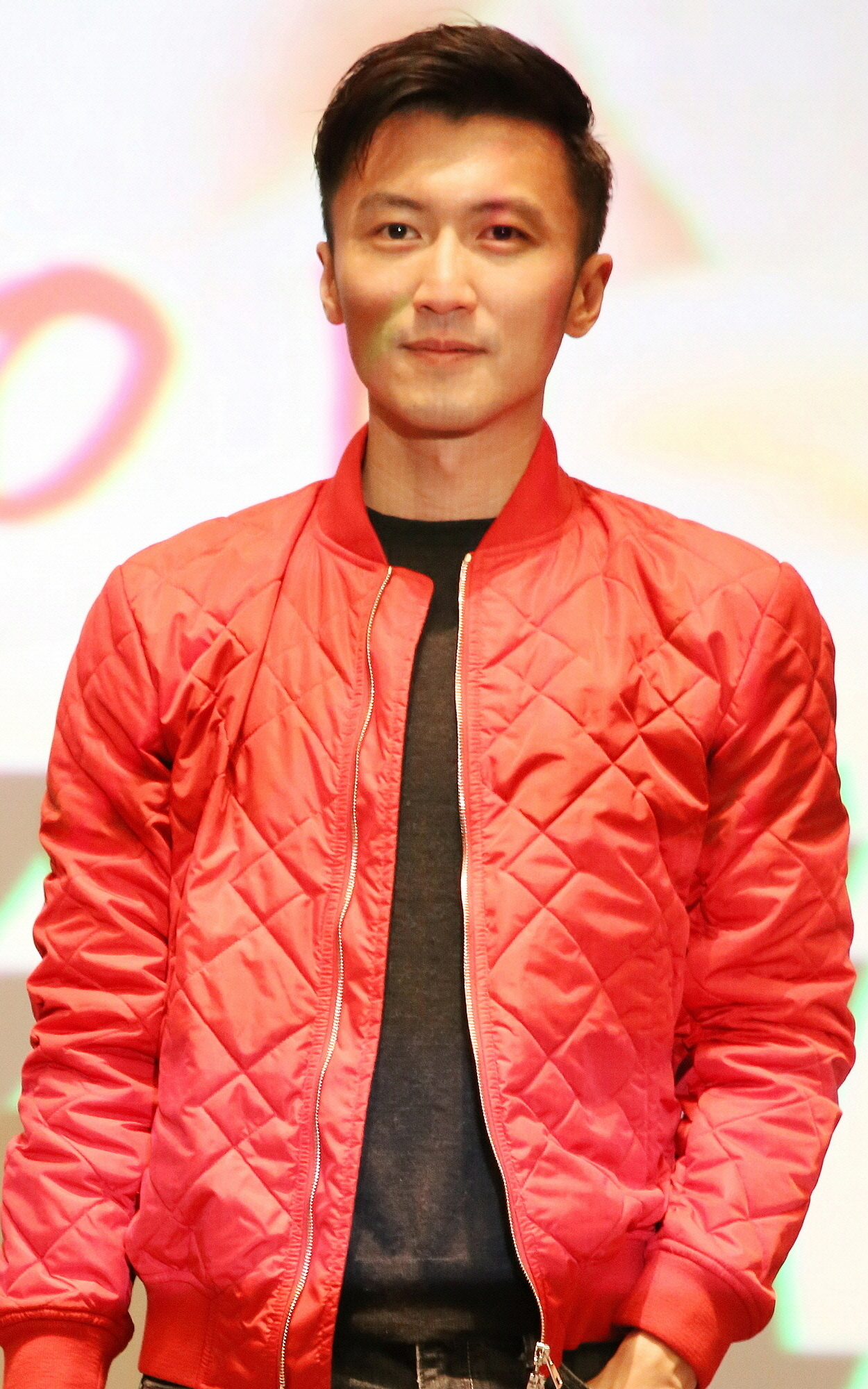
Nicholas Tse

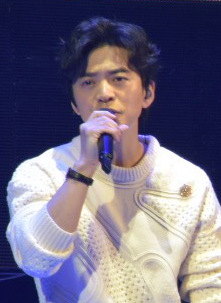
Li Jian

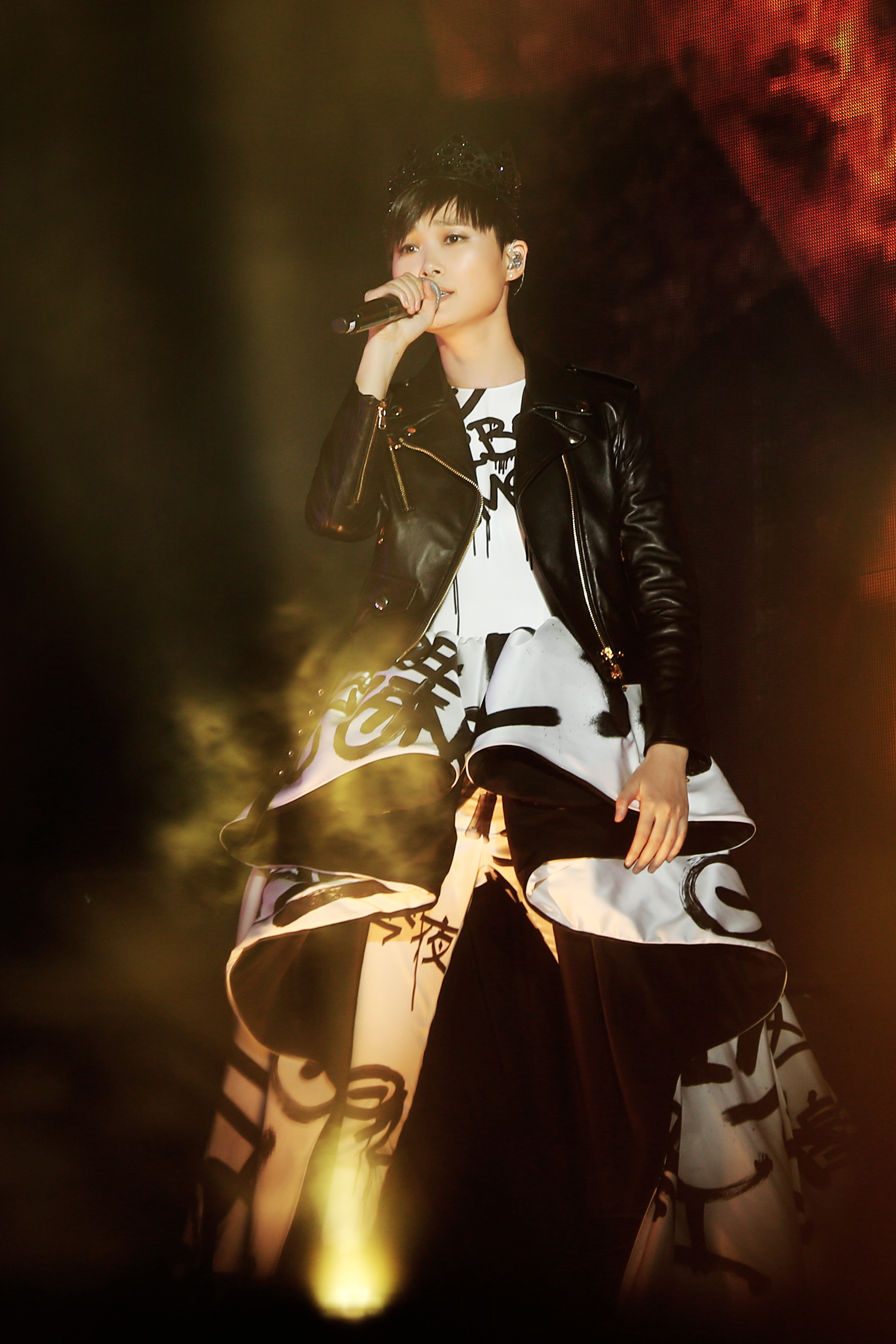
Li Yuchun

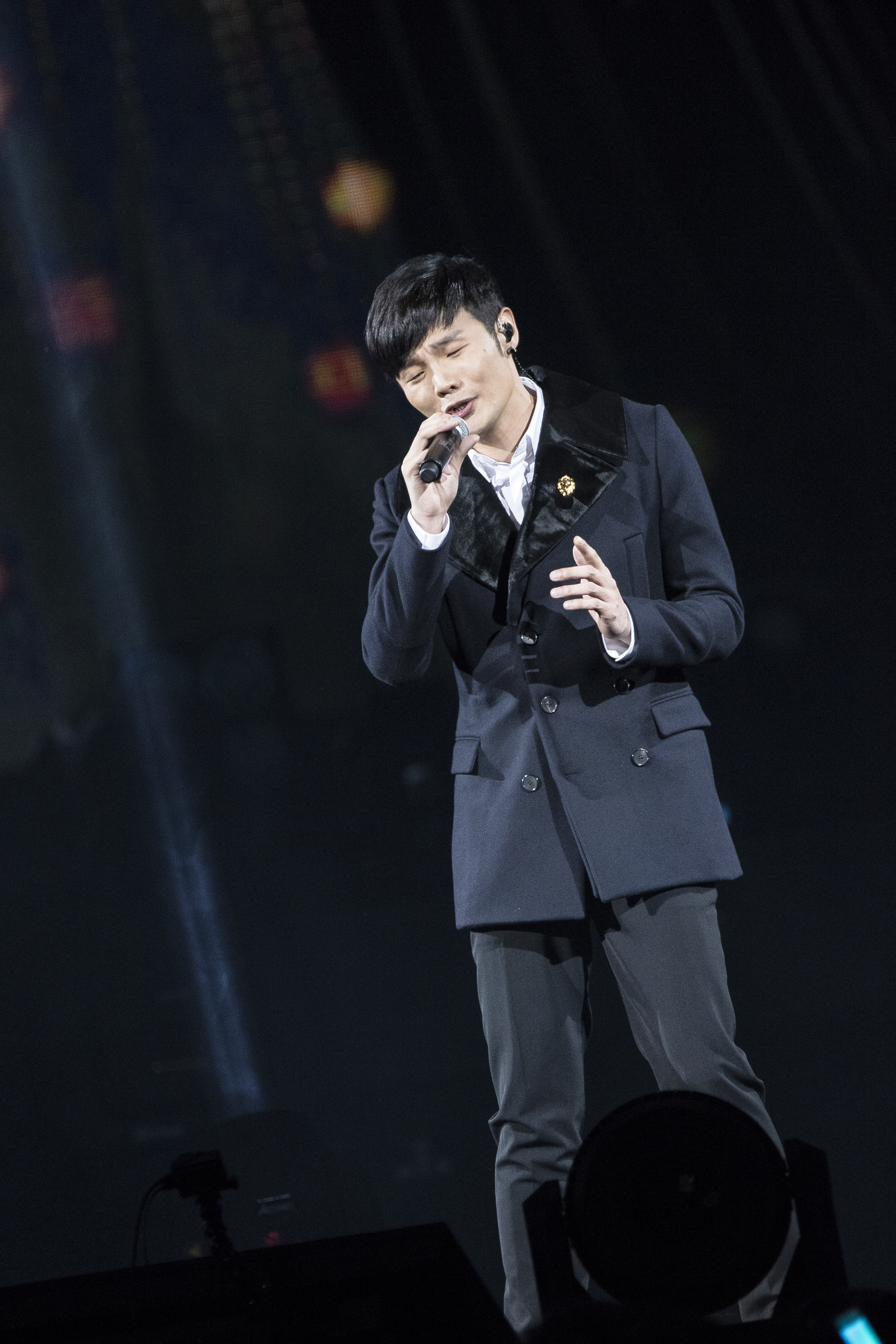
Li Ronghao

== Teams ==
Colour key

- Winner
- Runner-up
- Third place
- Fourth place
- Fifth place
- Eliminated in the Semi-finals
- Eliminated in the Quarter-finals
- Eliminated in the Cross Knockout rounds
- Eliminated in the Cross Battle rounds
- Saved by other coaches after losing sing-off in the Blind Auditions
- Eliminated in the Blind Auditions

Coaches	Top 28 artists			
Nicholas Tse				
Nicholas Tse	Cao Yang 曹杨	Jia Yiteng 贾翼腾	Fu Xinyao 傅欣瑶	Xi Xin 祁馨
Nicholas Tse	Pinocchio Vocal Orchestra 匹诺曹人声乐团	~~Gao Rui 高睿~~	~~Mu Su 穆苏~~	Wang Tianyang 王天阳
Nicholas Tse	Yan Maolin 晏茂淋			
Li Jian				
Li Jian	Shan Yichun 单依纯	Song Yuning 宋宇宁	Su Wei 苏伟	Gao Rui 高睿
Li Jian	Martina Duman 玛迪娜·都曼	Sun Meiqi 孙美琪	Fan Tianli 房田立	Mu Su 穆苏
Li Yuchun				
Li Yuchun	Pan Hong 潘虹	Ma Lu 马璐	Qian Jingtao 钱江涛	Zhao Zihua 赵紫骅
Li Yuchun	Wang Tianqi 王天琦	~~Zebra Forest 斑马森林~~	Fan Lu 范茹	Taijin Zhizhi 太金之之
Li Yuchun	Dragon Girl and Flying Elephant 龙女和飛象			
Li Ronghao				
Li Ronghao	Zebra Forest 斑马森林	Cheng Mohan 程墨寒	Sumyee Ma 马心怡	Cheng Xin 程欣
Li Ronghao	Moses Yan 严雯君	~~Zhao Zihua 赵紫骅~~		
Note: Italicized names are stolen artists (names struck through within former teams).

== Blind auditions ==
In this season, a new feature was added where artists can choose to perform their original songs at any point in time, which extends the blind audition rules of Sing My Song, a show that has been cancelled after 3 seasons.

In this stage, the coaches are to recruit a total of five artists to form a team of their own, contrary to six in Season 3. The forming of the teams would move to a format that is similar to the "Six-Chair Challenge" featured in the British version of The X Factor but modified. Once a team is full with five artists occupying all the spots, the subsequent artists which the coach has successfully recruited would have to face-off with one of the five artists in the sing-offs for a spot in the team.

The incoming artist may select any of the five defending artists to compete against in the sing-off, and both artists would each sing a new song and the coach would decide on the winner. The winner would be given the spot in the team. However, unlike Season 3, this season introduces the 'Save', where other coaches can save any losing artist from the sing offs (the same function as the steals from The Voice). The coaches are given 10 seconds to save the losing artist for elimination. If one coach presses their button, he/she will be automatically on the new coach's team and if more than one coach presses, same as with the blind auditions, the artist has the opportunity to choose which coach they want.

For defending artists, once they have won a sing-off against an incoming artist, they would receive immunity from the subsequent sing-offs and immediately advance to the next round of the competition.

Colour key

	Coach picked this artist to perform (via artist's song choice)
	Artist selected this coach as their preferred coach before performance
✔	Coach pressed their button
	Artist defaulted to this coach's team
	Artist elected to join this coach's team
	Artist eliminated with no coach pressing the button
	Artist remained on the team after winning sing-off; immune from subsequent sing-offs
	Artist remained on the team after winning sing-off; replaced a defending artist
	Artist saved by other coaches after losing sing-off
	Artist eliminated after losing sing-off

=== Episode 1 (21 August) ===
The show started with the coaches performing each other's songs. Li Ronghao performed Nicholas Tse's "谢谢你的爱1999", Nicholas then performed Li Jian's "傳奇", Li Jian, performed Li Yuchun's "漂浮地铁", and Li Yuchun performed Li Ronghao's "要我怎么辦".

Order	Artist	Age	Hometown	Song	Coach's and artist's choices			
Order	Artist	Age	Hometown	Song	Nicholas	Li Jian	Yuchun	Ronghao
1	Cheng Xin 程欣	23	Ningguo, Anhui	"童来"	✔	✔	✔	✔
2	Cheng Mohan 程墨寒	24	Yongkang, Zhejiang	"昨日青空"	—	—	✔	✔
3	Dragon Girl and Flying Elephant 龙女和飛象	26 & 27	—	"再不疯狂我们就老了"	✔	✔	✔	✔
4	Pan Hong 潘虹	21	Ganzhou, Jiangxi	"最好"	✔	✔	✔	—
5	Song Yuning 宋宇宁	26	Harbin, Heilongjiang	"三巡"	—	✔	—	✔
6	Mu Su 穆苏	23	Fuyang, Anhui	"上头歌"	✔	✔	—	—

=== Episode 2 (28 August) ===
Order	Artist	Age	Hometown	Song	Coach's and artist's choices			
Order	Artist	Age	Hometown	Song	Nicholas	Li Jian	Yuchun	Ronghao
1	Taijin Zhizhi 太金之之	19	Sichuan	"浪里游"	—	—	✔	—
2	Moses Yan 严雯君	24	Shanghai	"一个人的行李"	—	—	—	✔
3	Pinocchio Vocal Orchestra 匹诺曹人声乐团	—	—	"Mojito"	✔	—	—	—
4	Zhao Zihua 赵紫骅	32	Beijing	"一滴泪的时间"	—	✔	—	✔
5	Martina Duman 玛迪娜·都曼	20	Xinjiang, Tacheng	"不亏不欠"	✔	✔	—	—
6	Ma Lu 马璐	32	Shanghai	"T-me"	✔	—	✔	✔
7	Wang Tianyang 王天阳	28	Baotou, Inner Mongolia	"空"	✔	—	—	—
8	Sumyee Ma 马心怡	29	Nantong, Jiangsu	"Imagine"	—	✔	✔	✔
9	Jia Yiteng 贾翼腾	22	Henan, Zhengzhou	"走"	✔	✔	✔	—

=== Episode 3 (4 September) ===
Order	Artist	Age	Hometown	Song	Coach's and artist's choices			
Order	Artist	Age	Hometown	Song	Nicholas	Li Jian	Yuchun	Ronghao
1	Sun Meiqi 孙美琪	20	Guangzhou, Guangdong	"speak softly love"	✔	✔	—	—
2	Gao Rui 高睿	20	Chongqing, Sichuan	"炼爱"	✔	—	—	—
3	Qian Jingtao 钱江涛	24	Hangzhou	"如果我不是我"	—	—	✔	—
4	Fu Xinyao 傅欣瑶	21	Yongan, Fujian	"想着你"	✔	—	✔	—
5	Su Wei 苏伟	25	Fujian, Datian	"逝去的歌"	—	✔	✔	—
6	Shan Yichun 单依纯	18	Dongyang, Zhejiang	"永不失联的爱"	✔	✔	—	—
7	Xi Xin 祁馨	23	Inner Mongolia	"西京雁"	✔	—	—	—

=== Episode 4 (11 September) ===
Order	Artist	Age	Hometown	Song	Coach's and artist's choices			
Order	Artist	Age	Hometown	Song	Nicholas	Li Jian	Yuchun	Ronghao
1	Li Jiaen 李佳恩	26	Chengdu, Sichuan	"關山酒"	—	—	—	—
2	Qian Mingyang 钱明暘	25	Shanghai	"香水"	—	—	—	—
3	Zhang Yiwen 张艺雯	25	Yuncheng, Shanxi	"燈光"	—	—	—	—
4	Wang Tianqi 王天琦	27	Bozhou, Anhui	"清白之年"	—	✔	✔	—
5	Zebra Forest 斑马森林	25/22/24	—	"真的忘了"	—	—	✔	—
6	Fan Tianli 房田立	24	Huangshan, Anhui	"补修"	—	✔	—	—

=== Episode 5 (18 September) ===
Order	Artist	Age	Hometown	Song	Coach's and artist's choices			
Order	Artist	Age	Hometown	Song	Nicholas	Li Jian	Yuchun	Ronghao
1	Huang Chenchen 黄晨晨	19	Chongqing, Sichuan	"萤火之森"	—	—	—	—
2	Tong Jun 童珺	31	Shenzhen, Guangdong	"愛到底"	—	—	—	—
3	Cao Yang 蓸杨	28	Shanghai	"微光"	✔	✔	✔	—
4	Fan Lu 范茹	23	Xunyi, Jiangsu	"生而为人"	—	—	✔	—
5	Yan Maolin 晏茂淋	27	Jiangyou, Sichuan Province	"北极星"	✔	—	—	—

=== Sing-off details ===
Episode	Order	Song	Incoming artist	Defending artist	Song	Final 5 replacement chart				
Episode	Order	Song	Incoming artist	Defending artist	Song	1	2	3	4	5
Team Nicholas
First five defending artists						Mu Su 穆苏	Pinocchio Vocal Orchestra 匹诺曹人声乐团	Wang Tianyang 王天阳	Jia Yiteng 贾翼腾	~~Gao Rui 高睿~~
3	1	"蠅"	Fu Xinyao 傅欣瑶	Gao Rui 高睿 (saved by Li Jian)	"Dancing On My Own"	Mu Su 穆苏	Pinocchio Vocal Orchestra 匹诺曹人声乐团	Wang Tianyang 王天阳	Jia Yiteng 贾翼腾	Fu Xinyao 傅欣瑶
3	2	"我要去哪裡"	Xi Xin 祁馨	Wang Tianyang 王天阳	"擁有"	Mu Su 穆苏	Pinocchio Vocal Orchestra 匹诺曹人声乐团	Xi Xin 祁馨	Jia Yiteng 贾翼腾	Fu Xinyao 傅欣瑶
5	1	"走散"	Cao Yang 蓸杨	Mu Su 穆苏 (saved by Li Jian)	"戀曲1980"	Cao Yang 蓸杨	Pinocchio Vocal Orchestra 匹诺曹人声乐团	Xi Xin 祁馨	Jia Yiteng 贾翼腾	Fu Xinyao 傅欣瑶
5	2	"無法逃脫"	Yan Maolin 晏茂淋	Jia Yiteng 贾翼腾	"要死就一定要死在你手裡"	Cao Yang 蓸杨	Pinocchio Vocal Orchestra 匹诺曹人声乐团	Xi Xin 祁馨	Jia Yiteng 贾翼腾	Fu Xinyao 傅欣瑶
Team Li Jian
First five defending artists						Song Yuning 宋宇宁	Martina Duman 玛迪娜·都曼	Sun Meiqi 孙美琪	Gao Rui 高睿	Su Wei 苏伟
3	1	"像風一樣"	Shan Yichun 单依纯	Sun Meiqi 孙美琪	"La Vie En Rose"	Song Yuning 宋宇宁	Martina Duman 玛迪娜·都曼	Shan Yichun 单依纯	Gao Rui 高睿	Su Wei 苏伟
5	1	"深夜不要思考"	Fan Tianli 房田立	Gao Rui 高睿	"在你的雙眼遇見"	Song Yuning 宋宇宁	Martina Duman 玛迪娜·都曼	Shan Yichun 单依纯	Gao Rui 高睿	Su Wei 苏伟
5	2	"時候到溜"	Mu Su 穆苏	Su Wei 苏伟	"同花順"	Song Yuning 宋宇宁	Martina Duman 玛迪娜·都曼	Shan Yichun 单依纯	Gao Rui 高睿	Su Wei 苏伟
Team Li Yuchun
First five defending artists						Dragon Girl and Flying Elephant 龙女和飛象	Pan Hong 潘虹	Taijin Zhizhi 太金之之	Ma Lu 马璐	Qian Jingtao 钱江涛
4	1	"500 Miles"	Wang Tianqi 王天琦	Taijin Zhizhi 太金之之	"追了太陽三條街"	Dragon Girl and Flying Elephant 龙女和飛象	Pan Hong 潘虹	Wang Tianqi 王天琦	Ma Lu 马璐	Qian Jingtao 钱江涛
4	2	"听說"	Zebra Forest 斑马森林 (saved by Li Ronghao)	Qian Jingtao 钱江涛	"Foolish Heart"	Dragon Girl and Flying Elephant 龙女和飛象	Pan Hong 潘虹	Wang Tianqi 王天琦	Ma Lu 马璐	Qian Jingtao 钱江涛
4	3	"理由"	Zhao Zihua 赵紫骅	Dragon Girl and Flying Elephant 龙女和飛象	"Play 我呸"	Zhao Zihua 赵紫骅	Pan Hong 潘虹	Wang Tianqi 王天琦	Ma Lu 马璐	Qian Jingtao 钱江涛
5	1	"燈光"	Fan Lu 范茹	Pan Hong 潘虹	"那女孩對我說"	Zhao Zihua 赵紫骅	Pan Hong 潘虹	Wang Tianqi 王天琦	Ma Lu 马璐	Qian Jingtao 钱江涛
Team Li Ronghao
First five defending artists						Cheng Xin 程欣	Cheng Mohan 程墨寒	Moses Yan 严雯君	~~Zhao Zihua 赵紫骅~~	Sumyee Ma 马心怡
4	1	"燈塔"	Zebra Forest 斑马森林	Zhao Zihua 赵紫骅 (saved by Li Yuchun)	"因為你來過"	Cheng Xin 程欣	Cheng Mohan 程墨寒	Moses Yan 严雯君	Zebra Forest 斑马森林	Sumyee Ma 马心怡

== The Cross Battles ==
Before the start of the Cross Battles, the coaches would decide on the appearance order of their artists, and this was done without the knowledge of their opposing coach. Therefore, all artists would not know who they are competing against until they were revealed on stage by the host. The coaches were also allowed to modify the appearance order of their artists at any point in the competition to counter the opposing artists in the remaining Cross Battles.

A total of four Cross Battles were held between two opposing coaches. At the end of each Cross Battle, the winning artist will earn one point for their team, while the losing artist would not get any points. Each of the coaches are allowed to pick an artist from their team to let the artist receive bonus points. If the artist wins, two points will be added to the team, otherwise, the artist will not receive any points.

At the end of the Cross Battles, the team with the highest number of winning points will advance to the Cross Knockouts. Meanwhile, the losing team would have to face a penalty and eliminate an artist from their team to move on to the next round of the competition.

Colour key

	Artist won the Cross Battle (one or two points allocated to the team)
	Artist lost the Cross Battle (no points allocated to the team)
	Team won the Cross Battles with highest winning points
✔	Artist received Bonus Points
✘	Artist was eliminated by coach

Episode	Order	Song	Team Li Jian	Result		Team Yuchun	Song
Episode	Order	Song	Team Li Jian	5	1	Team Yuchun	Song
Episode 6 (26 September)	1	"流浪"	Martina Duman 玛迪娜·都曼	19	34	Zhao Zihua 赵紫骅	"怪我更愛我自己"
Episode 6 (26 September)	2	"浮光掠影"	Su Wei 苏伟	29	24	Ma Lu 马璐	"蔓延"
Episode 6 (26 September)	3	"爱的勇氣"	Gao Rui 高睿	36	17	Wang Tianqi 王天琦 ✘	"往事只能回味"
Episode 6 (26 September)	4	"你我约定有三"	Song Yuning 宋宇宁	30	23	Pan Hong 潘虹 ✔	"我曾经也想过一了百了"
Episode 6 (26 September)	5	"Forever Young"	Shan Yichun 单依纯 ✔	42	11	Qian Jingtao 钱江涛	"雨天"
Episode 7 (2 October)	Order	Song	Team Ronghao	Result		Team Nicholas	Song
Episode 7 (2 October)	Order	Song	Team Ronghao	2	4	Team Nicholas	Song
Episode 7 (2 October)	1	"香格里拉"	Cheng Xin 程欣	6	47	Cao Yang 蓸杨	"擱淺"
Episode 7 (2 October)	2	"我已經敢想你"	Cheng Mohan 程墨寒	26	27	Xi Xin 祁馨	"尼可拉斯"
Episode 7 (2 October)	3	"一路向北"	Zebra Forest 斑马森林 ✔	36	17	Pinocchio Vocal Orchestra 匹诺曹人声乐团	"卷珠帘"
Episode 7 (2 October)	4	"雨爱"	Moses Yan 严雯君 ✘	16	37	Jia Yiteng 贾翼腾	"飞"
Episode 7 (2 October)	5	"星空"	Zebra Forest 斑马森林^{1}	24	29	Fu Xinyao 傅欣瑶	"消失"

1. Sumyee Ma 马心怡 was absent due to a surgery, hence Zebra Forest 斑马森林 had to take her place.

== The Cross Knockouts ==
In this round, coaches will draw to determine the order in which they can select first. That coach will choose an artist from his team and state which opposing team he wants that artist to face off against. The chosen coach from the representative team will decide his/her opponent by draw as well. Each coach is allowed one block in this round. If a coach used a "Block" on his artist, he/she may not face a certain artist from another team by default. At the end of each Cross Knockout, the two artists will receive votes of approval from a 51-person judging panel. The artist with the most votes will advance to the Playoffs, while the other would be eliminated.

For the first time, two artists from the same team competed in the cross knockouts.

Colour key

Artist won the Cross Knockout and advanced to the Playoffs
Artist lost the Cross Knockout and was eliminated

Episode	Coach	Order	Artist	Song	Panel votes	Result	"Block" result				Blocked artist
Episode	Coach	Order	Artist	Song	Panel votes	Result	Nicholas	Li Jian	Yuchun	Ronghao	Blocked artist
Episode 9 (23 October)											
Episode 9 (23 October)	Li Ronghao	1.1	Cheng Xin 程欣	"半句再見"	9	Eliminated	—N/a	—N/a	—N/a	—	Not selected
Episode 9 (23 October)	Li Yuchun	1.2	Pan Hong 潘虹	"靈魂伴侶"	42	Advanced	—N/a	—N/a	—	—N/a	Not selected
Episode 9 (23 October)	Li Yuchun	2.1	Zhao Zihua 赵紫骅	"爸，你在哪裡"	22	Eliminated	—N/a	—N/a	✔	—N/a	Shan Yichun 单依纯
Episode 9 (23 October)	Li Jian	2.2	Su Wei 苏伟	"苔"	29	Advanced	—N/a	—	Block used	—N/a	Not selected
Episode 9 (23 October)	Nicholas Tse	3.1	Pinocchio Vocal Orchestra 匹诺曹人声乐团	"马灯调"	24	Eliminated	—	—N/a	Block used	—N/a	Not selected
Episode 9 (23 October)	Li Ronghao	3.2	Cheng Mohan 程墨寒	"我的心太乱"	27	Advanced	—N/a	—N/a	Block used	—	Not selected
Episode 9 (23 October)	Li Jian	4.1	Song Yuning 宋宇宁	"我已不怪你"	31	Advanced	—N/a	—	Block used	—N/a	Not selected
Episode 9 (23 October)	Li Yuchun	4.2	Qian Jingtao 钱江涛	"我我"	20	Eliminated	—N/a	—N/a	Block used	—N/a	Not selected
Episode 10 (30 October)									Block used		
Episode 10 (30 October)	Li Ronghao	1.1	Zebra Forest 斑马森林	"都是你害的"	33	Advanced	—N/a	—N/a	Block used	✔	Shan Yichun 单依纯
Episode 10 (30 October)	Li Jian	1.2	Martina Duman 玛迪娜·都曼	"Hello"	18	Eliminated	—	—N/a	Block used	Block used	Not selected
Episode 10 (30 October)	Li Yuchun	2.1	Ma Lu 马璐	"T+ME"	13	Eliminated	—N/a	—N/a	Block used	Block used	Not selected
Episode 10 (30 October)	Li Jian	2.2	Shan Yichun 单依纯	"如此"	38	Advanced	—N/a	—	Block used	Block used	Not selected
Episode 10 (30 October)	Nicholas Tse	3.1	Fu Xinyao 傅欣瑶	"Yellow"	34	Advanced	—	—N/a	Block used	Block used	Not selected
Episode 10 (30 October)	Li Jian	3.2	Gao Rui 高睿	"孩子(你還在我身旁)"	17	Eliminated	—N/a	—	Block used	Block used	Not selected
Episode 10 (30 October)	Li Ronghao	4.1	Sumyee Ma 马心怡	"可爱"	24	Eliminated	—N/a	—N/a	Block used	Block used	Not selected
Episode 10 (30 October)	Nicholas Tse	4.2	Jia Yiteng 贾翼腾	"攀山者"	27	Advanced	—	—N/a	Block used	Block used	Not selected
Episode 10 (30 October)	Nicholas Tse	5.1	Cao Yang 蓸杨	"旧伤口"	33	Advanced	—	—N/a	Block used	Block used	Not selected
Episode 10 (30 October)	Nicholas Tse	5.2	Xi Xin 祁馨	"我们的爱情"	18	Eliminated	—	—N/a	Block used	Block used	Not selected

== The Quarter-finals ==
The Top 9 performed in the Quarter-finals for a spot in the Top 7. The order of appearance of the artists was decided through the drawing of lots by their respective coaches. In deciding who moves on, a professional judging panel made up of 50 veteran record producers, music critics, and media practitioners from various media companies; as well as the studio audience made up of 300 members of the public were given an equal say. Each of the voters was entitled to one vote per artist, and they can either choose to vote or not vote for a particular artist. The maximum score that the student will receive of the professional judging panel review is 50, and 50 for the live audiences, thus having the maximum score of was 100. Seven artists with higher overall scores advanced, while two artists with the lowest scores will be eliminated from the competition.

Episode	Coach	Order	Artist	Song	Judges' score （out of 50）	Public votes （out of 300）	Total Points	Result
Episode 11 (6 November)	Li Jian	1	Song Yuning 宋宇宁	"Is It a Dream"	30	272 (45.33)	75.33	Advanced (5th)
Episode 11 (6 November)	Li Jian	2	Su Wei 苏伟	"陪我看日出"	23	235 (39.17)	62.17	Eliminated (8th)
Episode 11 (6 November)	Li Jian	3	Shan Yichun 单依纯	"人啊"	45	293 (48.83)	93.83	Advanced (1st)
Episode 11 (6 November)	Li Ronghao	4	Cheng Mohan 程墨寒	"对不起 谢谢"	13	228 (38)	51	Eliminated (9th)
Episode 11 (6 November)	Li Ronghao	5	Zebra Forest 斑马森林	"怀珠"	43	277 (46.17)	89.17	Advanced (3rd)
Episode 11 (6 November)	Nicholas Tse	6	Cao Yang 蓸杨	"给我一个理由忘记"	37	281 (46.83)	83.83	Advanced (4th)
Episode 11 (6 November)	Nicholas Tse	7	Fu Xinyao 傅欣瑶	"追光者"	25	266 (44.33)	69.33	Advanced (7th)
Episode 11 (6 November)	Nicholas Tse	8	Jia Yiteng 贾翼腾	"再见马戏团"	28	278 (46.33)	74.33	Advanced (6th)
Episode 11 (6 November)	Li Yuchun	9	Pan Hong 潘虹	"普希金"	44	295 (49.17)	93.17	Advanced (2nd)

== The Semi-finals ==
The Top 7 performed in the semi-finals for a slot in the finals. Just like in the playoffs, the order of appearance of the artists was decided through the drawing of lots by their respective coaches. The same voting procedure in the playoffs will be done in the semi-finals: a 50-member professional judging panel, except that there will be a 400-member audience instead of 300. Five artists with higher overall scores will advance to the final, while the other two will be eliminated.

With Zebra Forest's advancement to the final, this is the first time that a stolen artist made into the finale.

Episode	Coach	Order	Artist	Song	Judges' score （out of 50）	Public votes （out of 400）	Total Points	Result
Episode 12 (13 November)	Li Jian	1	Shan Yichun 单依纯	"给电影人的情書"	42	362 (45.25)	87.25	Advanced (3rd)
Episode 12 (13 November)	Nicholas Tse	2	Cao Yang 蓸杨	"就是爱你"	30	312 (39)	69	Advanced (5th)
Episode 12 (13 November)	Nicholas Tse	3	Fu Xinyao 傅欣瑶	"口袋的夢"	31	260 (32.5)	63.5	Eliminated (6th)
Episode 12 (13 November)	Li Yuchun	4	Pan Hong 潘虹	"让她降落"	44	368 (46)	90	Advanced (1st)
Episode 12 (13 November)	Nicholas Tse	5	Jia Yiteng 贾翼腾	"梦游歌"	20	288 (36)	56	Eliminated (7th)
Episode 12 (13 November)	Li Jian	6	Song Yuning 宋宇宁	"那年，年少"	30	370 (46.25)	76.25	Advanced (4th)
Episode 12 (13 November)	Li Ronghao	7	Zebra Forest 斑马森林	"那些花儿"	43	361 (45.125)	88.125	Advanced (2nd)

== The Finals ==
The Top 5 performed live in a two-part season finale on 21 November, held at the Beijing National Stadium. In the first round of the competition, the five finalists performed a duet with their coach, and a solo song. Based on the public votes received from the live audience at the end of the first round, the bottom three artists with the fewest votes would be eliminated.

The final two artists would then sing their winner's song before a 100-person panel and live audience, who will vote for the winner at the end of the performances. Every member of the panel would be entitled to one vote, and the total number of votes received by the artists from the panel and live audience would be converted into percentage points accordingly. The artist who received the highest number of points would be announced as the winner.

Coach	Artist	Round 1 (Final)					Round 2 (Grand Finale)					Result
Coach	Artist	Order	Duet song (with coach)	Order	Solo song	Public votes	Order	Winner's song	Panel votes (points)	Public points	Total points	Result
Li Jian	Song Yuning 宋宇宁	1	"城市之光"	5	"总有人会拥抱你"	22,974	N/A (already eliminated)					Fifth place
Li Jian	Shan Yichun 单依纯	1	"城市之光"	6	"好久不见"	38,869	10	"星 + Sailing"	68	35,311 (74.30)	74.51	Winner
Li Yuchun	Pan Hong 潘虹	2	"皇后与梦想"	7	"身后"	33,451	N/A (already eliminated)					Third place
Nicholas Tse	Cao Yang 蓸杨	3	"给天使看的戏"	8	"只有你不知道"	26,809	N/A (already eliminated)					Fourth place
Li Ronghao	Zebra Forest 斑马森林	4	"倒带"	9	"匆匆"	36,119	11	"一滴泪的时间"	23	12,217 (25.70)	25.49	Runner-up

== Contestants who appeared on previous seasons or TV shows ==
- Song Yuning competed in third season of Sing My Song on Team Liu Huan, and was eliminated in the composer round.
- Cao Yang was featured as a celebrity guest singer in the second season, performing alongside Janice Tan. He also appeared in Season 3 of Sound of My Dream.
