= Sing! China season 8 =

Sing! China
- Season 8
- Hosted by: Hu Qiaohua
- Coaches: Wakin Chau; Joker Xue; Wilber Pan; Henry Lau

Release
- Original network: Zhejiang Television
- Original release: 28 July – 18 August 2023

Season chronology
- ← Previous; Season 7

The eighth season of the Chinese reality talent show Sing! China premiered on 28 July 2023. None of the coaches from the previous season returned for this season, making it the first season to have a total renewal of the coaching panel.

== Coaches and presenters ==
On 5 June 2023, it was confirmed that the season will begin airing on 28 July 2023 with Wakin Chau, Joker Xue, Wilber Pan and Henry Lau joining as new coaches.

This is the first season to have four new coaches, and the second season not to have a female coach, the first season being in season 3.

Sing! China season 8 coaches

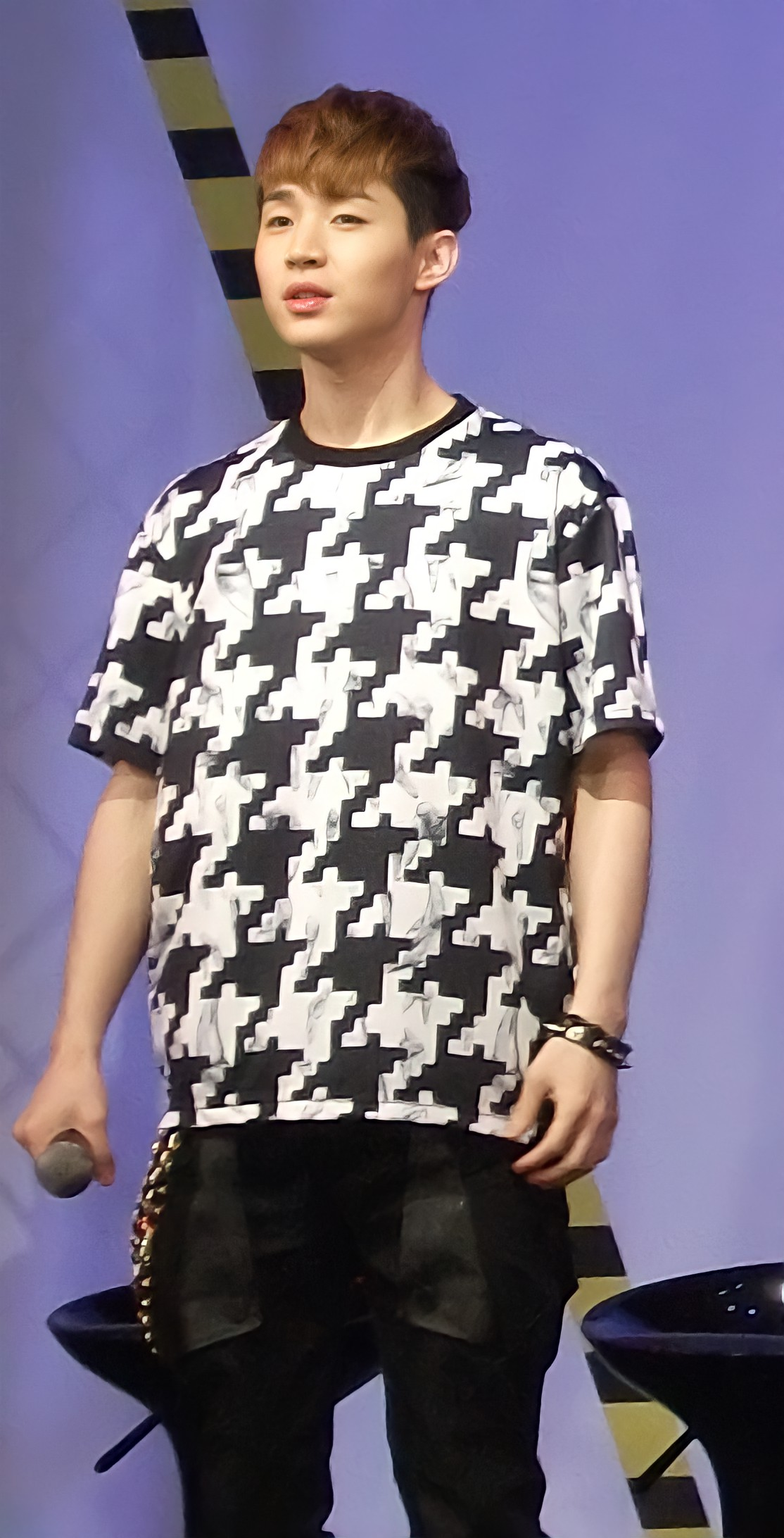
Henry Lau

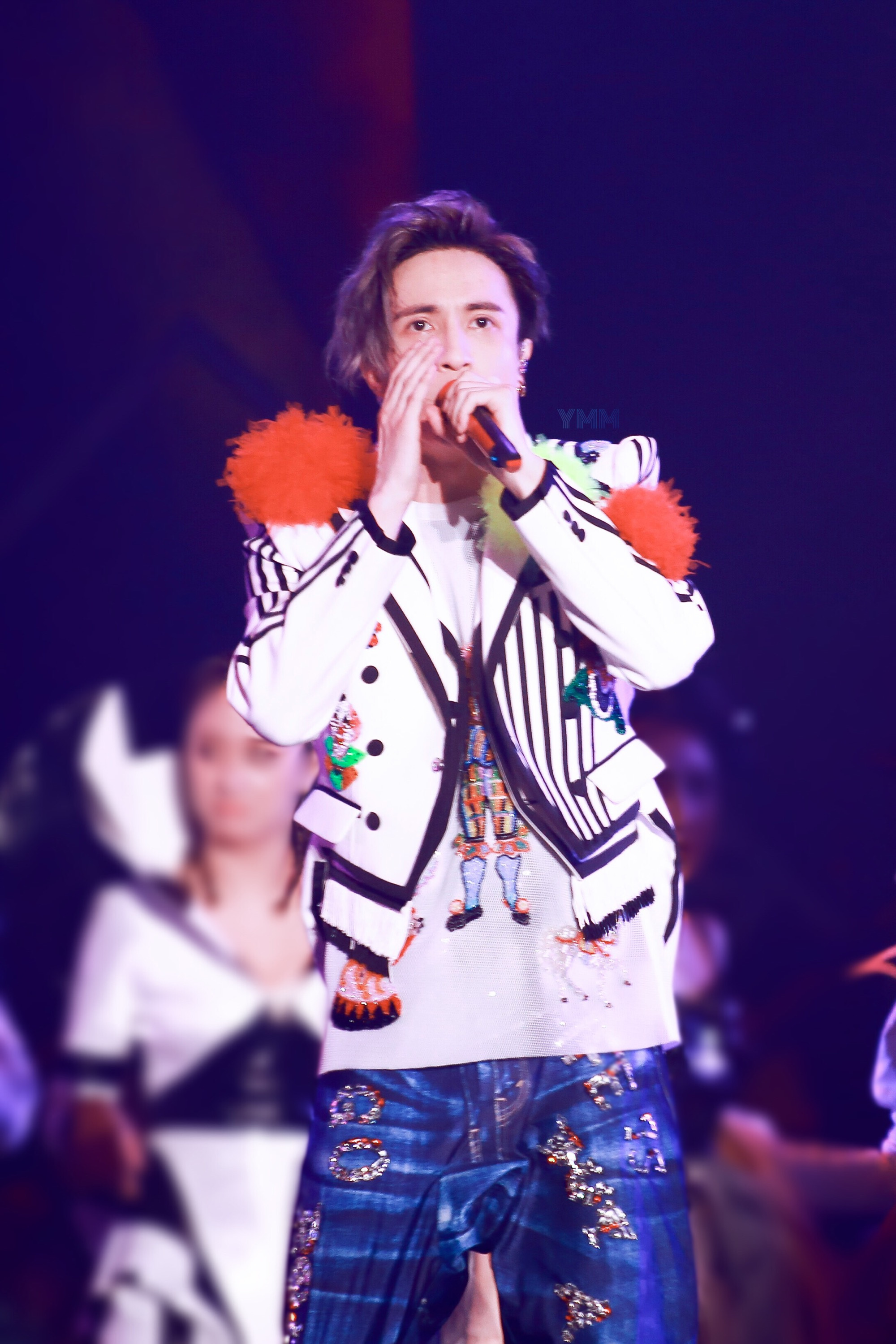
Joker Xue

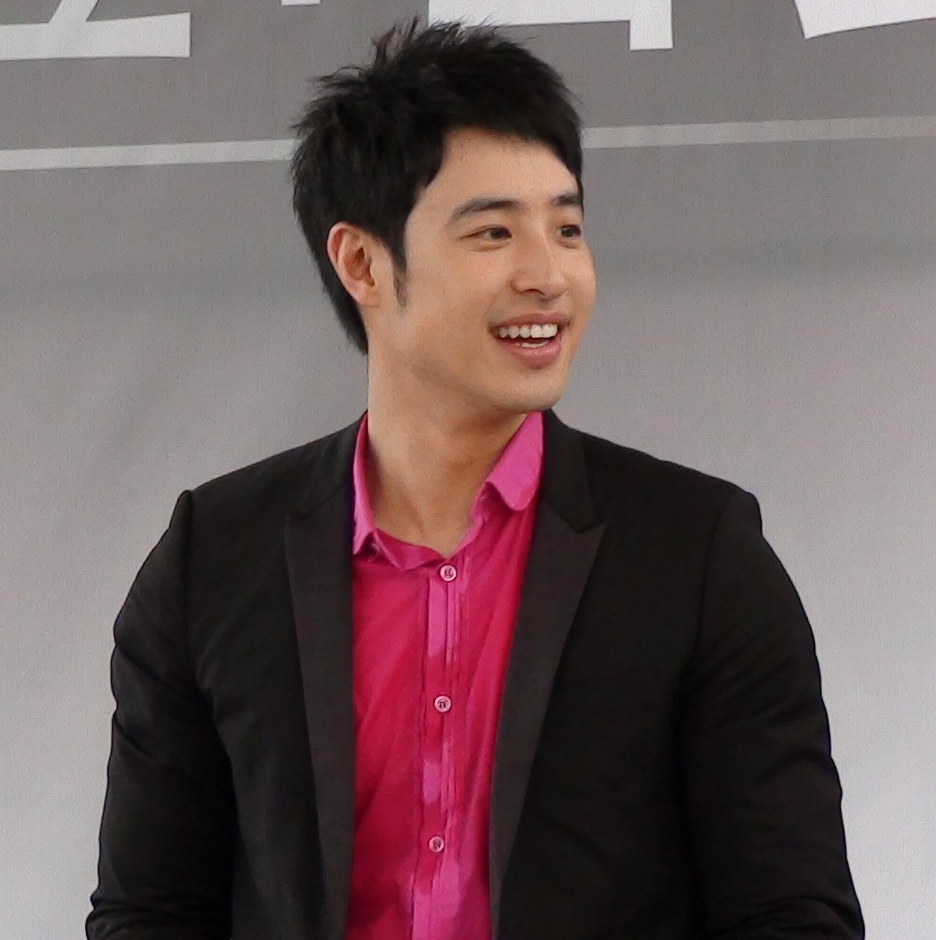
Wilber Pan

== Controversy and suspension ==
On the 4th episode of season 8, during a performance of the girl group Yomodo Band, Wilber Pan's chair swivelled away from the stage without him pushing his button, thus disapproving the contestant’s performance. However, due to his hands being visible on his lap and his confused facial expression, it is believed that he did not push the button.

On 25 August 2023, Zhejiang Satellite TV announced that the program had been frozen from broadcasting briefly pending an investigation over the Coco Lee's alleged mistreatment and other issues raised by viewers. It was reported that the suspension of the show was also partly due to current season 8's coaches, Wakin Chau and Joker Xue, had pulled out of the show after the incident with half of the season yet to be produced and filmed.

== Teams ==
Colour key

- Winner
- Runner-up
- Third place
- Fourth place
- Fifth place
- Eliminated in the Semi-finals
- Eliminated in the Playoffs
- Eliminated in the Cross Knockout rounds
- Eliminated in the Cross Battle rounds
- Saved by other coaches after losing sing-off in the Blind Auditions
- Eliminated in the Blind Auditions

Coaches' teams
Coach	Artists					
Henry Lau						
Henry Lau	Yuan Yifei 袁艺菲	PoLin 柏霖	LR 陆燃	Tang Kangning 唐康寧	Luoyang Yunzi 罗杨云子	Walter Kwan 关浩德
Henry Lau	Zhai Yue 翟越	~~Oscar Li 李在溪~~	Yang Su Adai 杨苏阿黛	Zhang Tianci 张天赐		
Wakin Chau						
Wakin Chau	Vanessa Reynauld 维莉莎	Clou 可楼	Wang Cong 王璁	Qiu Zhen 邱震	The Deep 组合	Mo Yao 墨谣
Wakin Chau	Light White & Pure Black 浅白纯黑	Zhang Huiqing 张惠晴	Huang Chenchen 黄晨晨			
Joker Xue						
Joker Xue	Mercury 水星	Lin Po 蔺颇	Qi Qi 戚琦	Chuan Chuan 川川	Xair Peng 彭诩越	Dream Island Band 游梦岛乐队
Joker Xue	~~Mo Yao 墨谣~~	Frankie Leung 梁凡				
Wilber Pan						
Wilber Pan	Zhao Mingxuan 赵明轩	Wang Xinzhu 汪芯竹	Syuen Rachel 陈蔚萱	Moe 莫维蒂	Oscar Li 李在溪	Chouchou 刘明宜
Wilber Pan	~~Xair Peng 彭诩越~~	Cao Kun 曹昆	He Jiaxin 何嘉鑫			
Note: Italicized names are stolen artists (names struck through within former teams).

== Blind Auditions ==
In this season, new mechanics before the blind auditions are introduced. Artists have two options to choose from before they go on stage. They consist of Blind Auditions and Open Selection. If they choose Blind Audition, the show will proceed by the normal rules. For those that choose Open Selection, the coaches will turn around and judge the artists as they perform. In addition, if a coach presses the red button during the Open Selection, it will turn the coach's chair back. If it is not turned back, it means that the students are invited to join that team.

The same mechanics from the blind auditions last season was implemented. The coaches are to recruit a total of six artists to form a team of their own. The forming of the teams would move to a format that is similar to the "Six-Chair Challenge" featured in the British version of The X Factor. Once a team is full with six artists occupying all the spots, the subsequent artists which the coach has successfully recruited would have to face-off with one of the six artists in the sing-offs for a spot in the team.

The incoming artist may select any of the six defending artists to compete against in the sing-off, and both artists would each sing a new song and the coach would decide on the winner. The winner would be given the spot in the team. However, continuing from last season, the losing artist has the chance to be saved by other coaches (the same function as the steals from The Voice). The coaches are given 10 seconds to save the losing artist for elimination. If one coach presses their button, they will be automatically placed on the new coach's team and if more than one coach presses, same as with the blind auditions, the artist has the opportunity to choose which coach they want.

For defending artists, once they have won a sing-off against an incoming artist, they would receive immunity from the subsequent sing-offs and immediately advance to the next round of the competition.

Colour key

	Artist chose Blind Auditions
	Artist chose Open Selection
✔	Coach pressed their button (Blind Auditions) / Valid choice (Open Selection)
	Artist defaulted to this coach's team
	Artist elected to join this coach's team
	Artist eliminated with no coach pressing the button (Blind Audition) / all coaches pressed their button (Open Selection)
	Artist remained on the team after winning sing-off; immune from subsequent sing-offs
	Artist remained on the team after winning sing-off; replaced a defending artist
	Artist saved by other coaches after losing sing-off
	Artist eliminated after losing sing-off

=== Episode 1 (July 28) ===
Order	Artist	Ages	Hometown	Song	Coach's and artist's choices			
Order	Artist	Ages	Hometown	Song	Henry	Wakin	Joker	Wilber
1	Yuan Yifei 袁艺菲	20	Tangshan, Hebei	"致未来的我"	✔	✔	✔	✔
2	Zhou Enyang 周恩洋	22	Dongying, Shandong	"白蛇"	–	–	–	–
3	PoLin 柏霖	29	Taiwan	"遗书"	✔	✔	✔	✔
4	Mercury 水星	26	Leshan, Sichuan	"豆子"	✔	–	✔	✔
5	Light White & Pure Black 浅白纯黑	26 & 23	Huaihua, Hunan/Shanghai	年	–	✔	–	✔

=== Episode 2 (August 4) ===
Order	Artist	Ages	Hometown	Song	Coach's and artist's choices			
Order	Artist	Ages	Hometown	Song	Henry	Wakin	Joker	Wilber
1	Zhang Huiqing 张惠晴	19	Canada	"你的家"	–	✔	–	–
2	Zhang Tianci 张天赐	21	Tieling, Liaoning	"孩子气"	✔	–	–	–
3	Zhao Mingxuan 赵明轩	24	Beijing	"立"	–	–	–	✔
4	Xair Peng 彭诩越	22	Kuala Lumpur, Malaysia	"节奏先生"	–	–	–	✔
5	Lin Po 蔺颇	30	Tianjin	"抵抗引力"	–	–	✔	✔
6	Vanessa Reynauld 维莉莎	23	Klang, Malaysia	"乘着风"	✔	✔	✔	✔
7	Oscar Li 李在溪	26	Beijing	"梦"	✔	–	–	✔
8	Wang Xinzhu 汪芯竹	23	Harbin, Heilongjiang	"Love Spell"	✔	–	✔	✔
9	Qi Qi 戚琦	25	Harbin, Heilongjiang	"婚约"	–	–	✔	–
10	Clou 可楼	20	Vienna, Austria	"我的美丽"	–	✔	–	✔
11	Huang Chenchen 黄晨晨	22	Chongqing	"大人"	–	✔	✔	✔

=== Episode 3 (August 11) ===
Order	Artist	Ages	Hometown	Song	Coach's and artist's choices			
Order	Artist	Ages	Hometown	Song	Henry	Wakin	Joker	Wilber
1	Yang Su Adai 杨苏阿黛	26	Sichuan	"The Rose"	✔	–	–	–
2	Wang Cong 王璁	21	Yancheng, Jiangsu	"洗牌"	–	✔	–	–
3	Cao Kun 曹昆	26	Luzhou, Sichuan	"根本不是我的对手"	–	–	–	✔
4	He Jiaxin 何嘉鑫	22	Honghe, Yunnan	"少年"	–	–	–	✔
5	Syuen Rachel 陈蔚萱	20	Malaysia	"雨后日记"	–	–	–	✔
6	LR 陆燃	24	Changchun, Jilin	"三拜红尘凉"	✔	✔	–	✔
7	Moe 莫维蒂	26	Pretoria, South Africa	"爱"	–	✔	–	✔
8	Chuan Chuan 川川	20	Fuzhou, Fujian	"河流"	–	✔	✔	✔
9	Tang Kangning 唐康宁	20	Chongqing	"不开灯俱乐部"	✔	–	–	–
10	Luoyang Yunzi 罗杨云子	28	Hubei, Wuhan	"逃"	✔	✔	✔	✔

=== Episode 4 (August 18) ===
Order	Artist	Ages	Hometown	Song	Coach's and artist's choices			
Order	Artist	Ages	Hometown	Song	Henry	Wakin	Joker	Wilber
1	Mo Yao 墨谣	30	Zhenjiang, Jiangsu	"舞月光"	–	–	✔	–
2	Chouchou 刘明宜	23	Qingyuan, Guangdong	"披星戴月的想你"	–	✔	–	✔
3	Qiu Zhen 邱震	28	Shenzhen	"逃亡"	–	✔	–	–
4	The Deep 组合	26 & 28	Beijing, Chongqing	"爱如火"	–	✔	✔	–
5	Walter Kwan 关浩德	30	Hong Kong	"遇见"	✔	–	✔	–
6	Frankie Leung 梁凡	34	Xi'an, Shanxi	"仅好友可见"	–	–	✔	–
7	Dream Island Band 游梦岛乐队	–	–	"爱本身"	–	–	✔	–
8	Zhai Yue 翟越	21	Harbin, Heilongjiang	"Monster (怪物)"	✔	✔	✔	✔

=== Sing-off details ===
Episode	Order	Song	Incoming artist	Defending artist	Song	Final 6 replacement chart					
Episode	Order	Song	Incoming artist	Defending artist	Song	1	2	3	4	5	6
Team Henry Lau
First six defending artists						Yuan Yifei 袁艺菲	Bai Lin 柏霖	Zhang Tianci 张天赐	~~Oscar Li 李在溪~~	Yang Su Adai 杨苏阿黛	LR 陆燃
3	1	"Jessiya"	Tang Kangning 唐康宁	Oscar Li 李在溪 (saved by Wilber)	"Walawalawa"	Yuan Yifei 袁艺菲	Bai Lin 柏霖	Zhang Tianci 张天赐	Tang Kangning 唐康宁	Yang Su Adai 杨苏阿黛	LR 陆燃
3	2	"Fire"	Luoyang Yunzi 罗杨云子	Yang Su Adai 杨苏阿黛	"Mafia"	Yuan Yifei 袁艺菲	Bai Lin 柏霖	Zhang Tianci 张天赐	Tang Kangning 唐康宁	Luoyang Yunzi 罗杨云子	LR 陆燃
4	3	"Lost you twice (失去你两次)"	Walter Kwan 关浩德	Zhang Tianci 张天赐	"囍"	Yuan Yifei 袁艺菲	Bai Lin 柏霖	Walter Kwan 关浩德	Tang Kangning 唐康宁	Luoyang Yunzi 罗杨云子	LR 陆燃
Team Wakin Chau
First six defending artists						Light White & Pure Black 浅白纯黑	Zhang Huiqing 张惠晴	Vanessa Reynauld 维莉莎	Clou 可楼	Huang Chenchen 黄晨晨	Wang Cong 王璁
4	1	"去有风的地方"	Qiu Zhen 邱震	Light White & Pure Black 浅白纯黑	"世界不会轻易崩塌"	Qiu Zhen 邱震	Zhang Huiqing 张惠晴	Vanessa Reynauld 维莉莎	Clou 可楼	Huang Chenchen 黄晨晨	Wang Cong 王璁
4	2	"飞蛾之殇"	The Deep 组合	Zhang Huiqing 张惠晴	"Part of Your World (你世界的一部分)"	Qiu Zhen 邱震	The Deep 组合	Vanessa Reynauld 维莉莎	Clou 可楼	Huang Chenchen 黄晨晨	Wang Cong 王璁
4	3	"植物学家"	Mo Yao 墨谣	Huang Chenchen 黄晨晨	"谁来剪月光"	Qiu Zhen 邱震	The Deep 组合	Vanessa Reynauld 维莉莎	Clou 可楼	Mo Yao 墨谣	Wang Cong 王璁
Team Joker Xue
First six defending artists						Mercury 水星	Lin Po 蔺颇	Qi Qi 戚琦	Chuan Chuan 川川	~~Mo Yao 墨谣~~	Xair Peng 彭诩越
4	1	"念念于心"	Frankie Leung 梁凡	Lin Po 蔺颇	"Goodbye Miss Georgia (再见乔治娅)"	Mercury 水星	Lin Po 蔺颇	Qi Qi 戚琦	Chuan Chuan 川川	~~Mo Yao 墨谣~~	Xair Peng 彭诩越
4	2	"妹妹"	Dream Island Band 游梦岛乐队	Mo Yao 墨谣 (saved by Wakin)	"逃离城市的第一个夜晚"	Mercury 水星	Lin Po 蔺颇	Qi Qi 戚琦	Chuan Chuan 川川	Dream Island Band 游梦岛乐队	Xair Peng 彭诩越
Team Wilber Pan
First six defending artists						Zhao Mingxuan 赵明轩	~~Xair Peng 彭诩越~~	Wang Xinzhu 汪芯竹	Cao Kun 曹昆	He Jiaxin 何嘉鑫	Syuen Rachel 陈蔚萱
3	1	"Rain"	Moe 莫维蒂	Cao Kun 曹昆	"与她"	Zhao Mingxuan 赵明轩	~~Xair Peng 彭诩越~~	Wang Xinzhu 汪芯竹	Moe 莫维蒂	He Jiaxin 何嘉鑫	Syuen Rachel 陈蔚萱
3	2	"地球母亲"	Oscar Li 李在溪	He Jiaxin 何嘉鑫	"云中岛"	Zhao Mingxuan 赵明轩	~~Xair Peng 彭诩越~~	Wang Xinzhu 汪芯竹	Moe 莫维蒂	Oscar Li 李在溪	Syuen Rachel 陈蔚萱
4	3	"若水"	Chouchou 刘明宜	Xair Peng 彭诩越 (saved by Joker)	"特务J"	Zhao Mingxuan 赵明轩	Chouchou 刘明宜	Wang Xinzhu 汪芯竹	Moe 莫维蒂	Oscar Li 李在溪	Syuen Rachel 陈蔚萱
