= Sing! China =

Chinese singing competition television series

- Genre: Reality competition
- Created by: John de Mol
- Directed by: Jin Lei
- Presented by: Li Yong; Yi Yi; Hu Qiaohua; Shen Tao; Rosy Luo; Andy Lau
- Judges: Jay Chou (2016–2018); Harlem Yu (2016, 2018–2019); Na Ying (part time, 2021; full time, 2016–2017, 2019); Wang Feng (2016, 2021); Eason Chan (2017); Liu Huan (2017); Li Jian (2018, 2020); Nicholas Tse (2018,2020); Li Ronghao (2019–2022); Wang Leehom (2019); Chris Li (2020); Hacken Lee (2021–2022); Liao Changyong (part time, 2021-2022); Fish Leong (2022); Coco Lee (part time, 2022); Wakin Chau (2023—); Joker Xue (2023—); Wilber Pan (2023—); Henry Lau (2023—)
- Country of origin: China
- Original language: Chinese
- No. of seasons: 8
- No. of episodes: 44

Production
- Production location: Jiaxing, Zhejiang
- Camera setup: Multi-camera
- Running time: 90 minutes
- Production company: Star China Media

Original release
- Network: Zhejiang Television
- Release: 15 July 2016 – 18 August 2023

Related
- The Voice of China

Sing! China (Chinese: 中国好声音; pinyin: Zhōngguó Hǎo Shēngyīn; formerly Chinese: 中国新歌声; pinyin: Zhōngguó Xīn Gēshēng) is a Chinese singing competition television series broadcast on Zhejiang Television. It is produced by Star (CM) Holdings Ltd. It premiered during the summer on 15 July 2016. It is a re-branded version of The Voice of China, a show based on the original The Voice of Holland. It has aired seven seasons and aims to find new singing talent (solo or duets, professional and amateur) contested by aspiring singers, aged 18 or older (16 or older in seasons one and two), drawn from public auditions.

The winner is determined by live audience voting by SMS text. They receive a record deal with various labels for winning the competition. Winners of the past seven seasons have been: Jiang Dunhao (蒋敦豪), Tashi Phuntsok (扎西平措), Tenzin Nyima (旦增尼玛), Xing Hanming (邢晗铭), Shan Yichun (单依纯), Wu Keyue (伍珂玥), and Sumi Liang (梁玉莹).

The series employs a panel of four coaches who critique the artists' performances and guide their teams of selected artists through the remainder of the season. They also compete to ensure that their act wins the competition, thus making them the winning coach. The original panel featured Jay Chou, Na Ying, Wang Feng, and Harlem Yu. Other coaches from previous seasons include Eason Chan, Liu Huan, Nicholas Tse, Li Jian, Wang Leehom, Li Ronghao, Chris Li, Hacken Lee and Fish Leong.

The latest season eight began airing on 28 July 2023 with Wakin Chau, Joker Xue, Wilber Pan, and Henry Lau joining as new coaches, but it was put on hold on 25 August 2023 pending an investigation into the alleged mistreatment of late singer Coco Lee, who was one of the coaches on Sing! China in 2022, and other issues raised by the netizens and viewers of the program.

== Format ==
The series consists of three main phases: a blind audition, a battle phase, and live performance shows. The four judges/coaches choose teams of contestants through a blind audition process. Each judge has the length of the auditioner's performance to decide if he or she wants that singer on his or her team. They can do it by pressing their button and their chairs will face the artist, just like in The Voice. If only one coach want the same singer, that singer will be defaulted to his/her team. If two or more coaches want the same singer (as happens frequently), the singer has the final choice of coach.

In Season 8, for the first time in the history of the show, artists have two options to choose from before they go on stage: Blind Audition and Open Selection. If they choose the former, the show will proceed by the normal rules. If they chose the latter, the coaches will turn around and judge the artists as they perform. In addition, if a coach presses the red button during the Open Selection, it will turn the coach's chair back and the singer isn't allowed to pick that coach. At the end of the performance, if the coach didn't press the button, it means that the students are invited to join that team.

Since 2018, artists that are not selected by any of the coaches leave the stage directly after their song and do not talk with the coaches. The chairs do not turn and hence the coaches do not see any artists that are not picked. Exceptions include if a coach wants to see the unchosen artist after their performance by request. However, this has been reversed in Season 8.

Each team of singers is mentored and developed by its respective coach. In the second stage, originally called the battle phase, coaches have two of their team members battle against each other directly by singing the same song together, with the coach choosing which team member to advance from each of the individual "battles". However, from Season 5 onwards, the second stage consists of a cross battle phase, which is similar to the regular battle phase, except for the fact that two artists who are not from the same team battle against each other. Winning artists score a point for their team. The losing artists do not earn any points but are not immediately eliminated. At the end of the cross battle rounds, whichever team that achieved a lower score will have to eliminate one artist from their team as a penalty. Other artists advance to the cross knockout rounds. Cross Knockout rounds are similar to the cross battle rounds except that losing artists are immediately eliminated. Winning artists move on to the first live rounds. Within that first live round, the surviving four acts from each team again compete head-to-head, with public votes determining the best of four acts from each team that will advance to the final eight, while the coach chooses which of the remaining three acts comprises the other performer remaining on the team.

In the final phase, the remaining contestants compete against each other in live broadcasts. The audience and the coaches have equal say in deciding who moves on to the final 4 phase. With one contestant remaining for each coach, the four contestants will compete against each other in the final round with the outcome decided solely by public vote.

Initially, there were no steals/saves in the entire competition. However, since season 5, any artist eliminated during the sing-offs by their coach can be stolen/saved by other coaches.

== Controversies ==
=== Coco Lee's mistreatment ===
In September 2022, a video went viral showing Coco Lee, one of the mentors on season 7, arguing with the show's director about which contestants should have advanced. Some netizens alleged that the show was known to be shady, while others said the production team's desire was to speed up filming due to ongoing delays.

In a nine-minute audio clip, which was leaked after her death, Lee described her mistreatment by the production team during the show's final episode in October 2022. According to the clip, while battling illnesses, she was subjected to a sudden placement change during a performance with Wang Zepeng, a contestant on her team. This caused Lee to stand alone in seven-inch heels and fall during their duet. She described this experience as "humiliating," especially since her health issues had been largely concealed from the public. Wang later supported Lee's claims by sharing a screen capture of their private text messages from that time.

By August 25, 2023, the stock price of Star China Media, the parent company of "Sing! China," had plummeted by more than 50 percent, resulting in a loss of approximately $3 billion in value, as members of the public called for a boycott.

=== Insiders' claims ===
Li Jiajie, one of the contestants in season 8 (2023), said that "the price of 500,000 yuan per seat, in his opinion, is certainly not a baseless rumor," implying that the top ten places in the finals are all available for purchase. His posts were mysteriously removed, and Li later said that his allegations were made without basis. People were surprised by the posts' removal and his "apology", leaving comments to ask if he was threatened.

Zhang Weiqi, a contestant from season 1 of the Voice of China (2012), denied the rumor of turning a chair for 500,000 yuan, but revealed that the participants needed to sign a contract for 9 years to continue performing on the show in the finals. He also claimed that the participants who introduced themselves as truck drivers, farmers, nail salon owners, etc. were all fake, but for the sake of effects in the show.

=== Wilber Pan's chair ===
On the 4th episode of season 8, during a performance of the girl group Yomodo Band, Wilber Pan's chair swivelled away from the stage without him pushing the button, thus disapproving the contestant's performance. However, as his hands were observed to be resting on his lap, and with his mouth appeared to have said the word "what", many netizens believed that he did not push the button to opt for disqualifying the contestant from proceeding to the next round.

== Suspension ==
On 25 August 2023, Zhejiang Satellite TV announced that the program had been frozen from broadcasting briefly pending an investigation over the alleged mistreatment of Coco Lee and other issues raised by netizens and viewers. It was reported that the suspension of the show was also partly due to current season 8's coaches, Wakin Chau and Joker Xue, having insisted on pulling out of the show after the incident with half of the season yet to be produced and filmed. Chau's team denied the rumor that Wakin Chau had pulled out from the show.

== Coaches and hosts ==
=== Coaches ===
Sing! China season 8 coaches

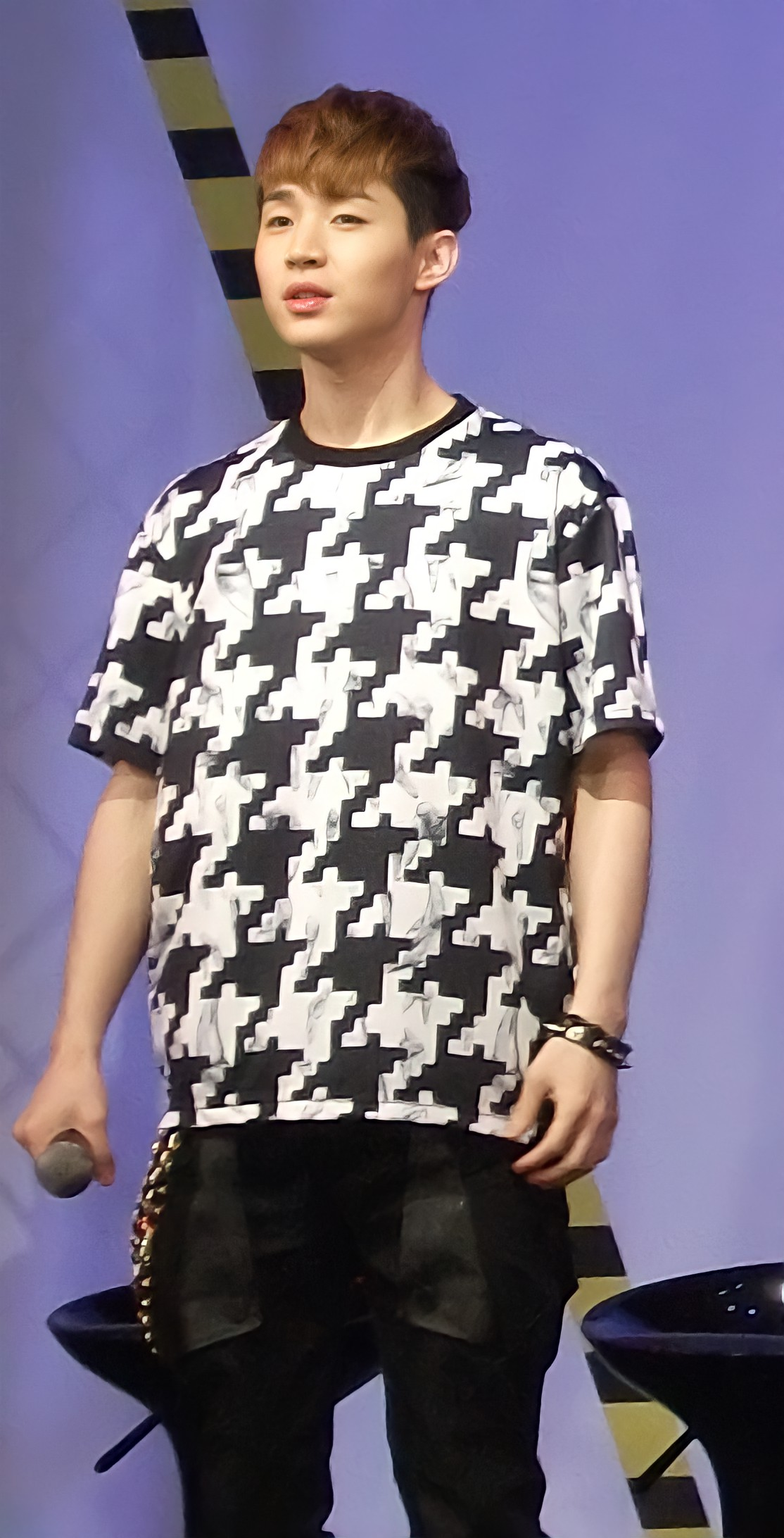
Henry Lau

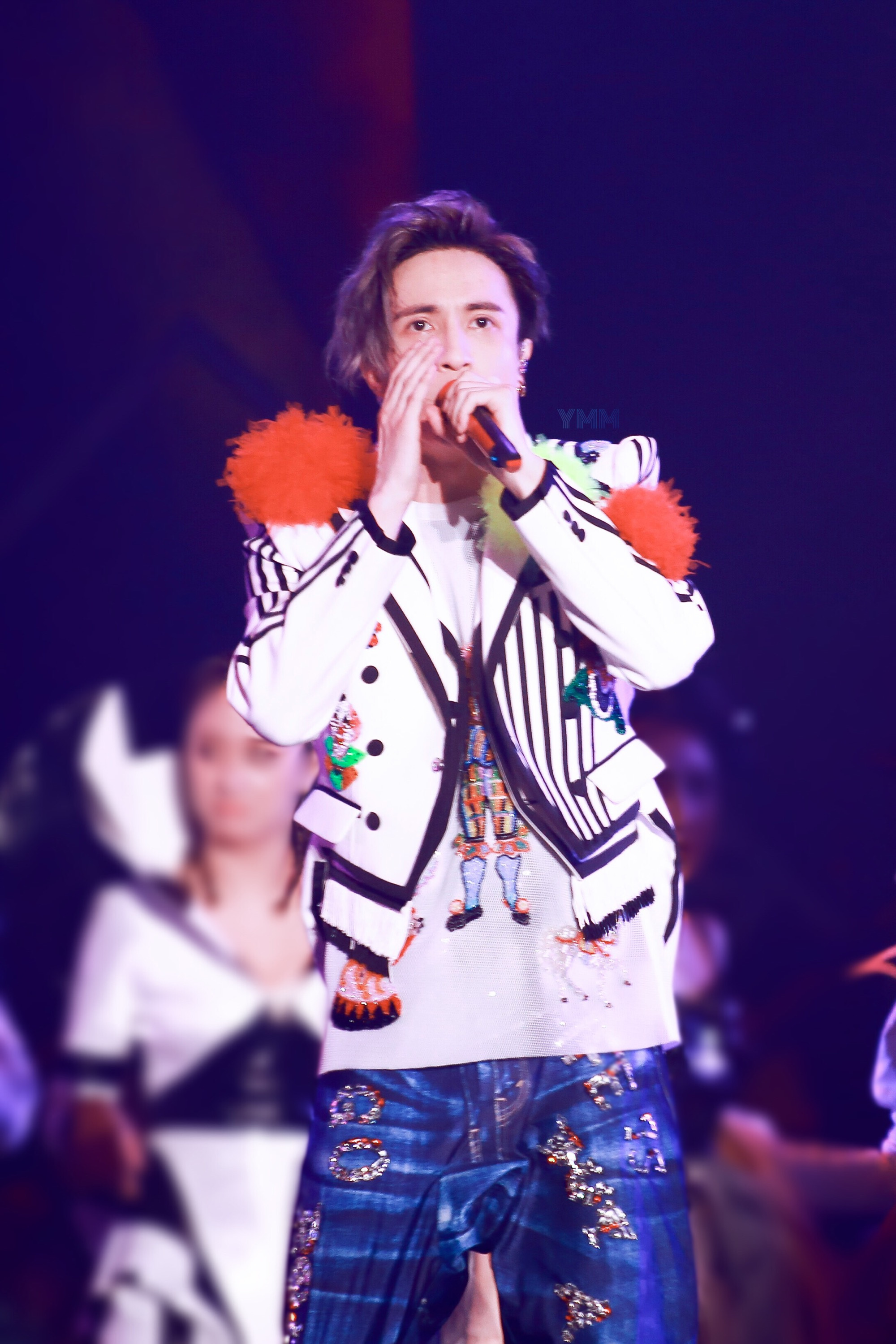
Joker Xue

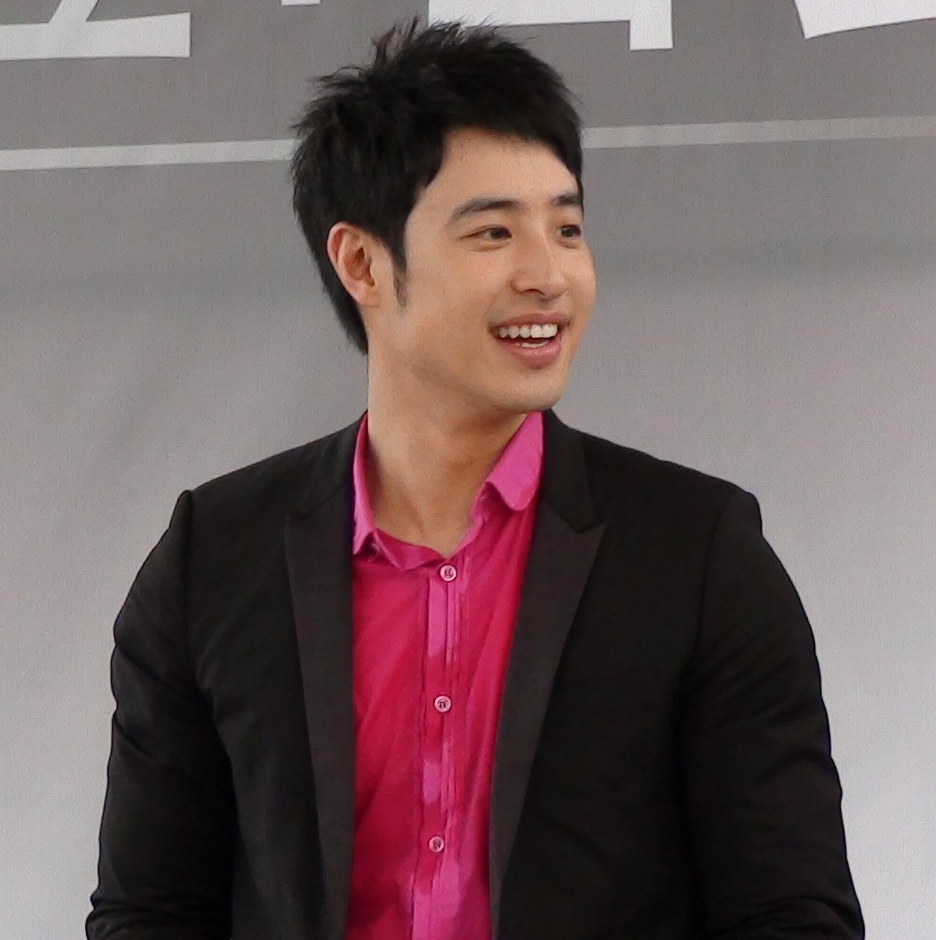
Wilber Pan

Timeline of coaches
Coach	Seasons							
Coach	1	2	3	4	5	6	7	8
Jay Chou								
Harlem Yu								
Na Ying								
汪峰 Wang Feng								
Eason Chan								
Liu Huan								
Li Jian								
Nicholas Tse								
Li Ronghao								
Wang Leehom								
Chris Li								
Hacken Lee								
Liao Changyong								
Fish Leong								
Coco Lee								
Momo Wu^{1}								
Jike Junyi^{1}								
Zhang Bichen^{1}								
Huang Xiaoyun^{1}^{2}								
Curley G^{2}								
Wakin Chau								
Joker Xue								
Wilber Pan								
Henry Lau								

Notes

1. In Season 6, Momo Wu, Jike Junyi, Zhang Bichen and Huang Xiaoyun took responsibility as advisors to their respective coaches.
2. In Season 7, Huang Xiaoyun and Curley G took responsibility as "Comeback Stage" coaches.

Legend
Featured as a full-time coach.
Featured as a part-time coach.
Featured as a full-time assistant coach.

=== Hosts ===
Timeline of hosts
Host	Seasons							
Host	1	2	3	4	5	6	7	8
Li Yong								
Hu Qiaohua								
Yi Yi								
Shen Tao								
Rosy Luo								
Andy Lau								

Legend
Featured as a full time host.
Featured as a backstage host.
Featured as a part time host.

== Dream coaches (as Coaches' advisors) ==
Season	Team Jay	Team Wang Feng	Team Na Ying	Team Harlem
1	Fei Yu-ching	Tanya Chua	Lang Lang	Mavis Fan

== Singing-accompanying guests ==
Season	Team Eason	Team Na Ying	Team Liu Huan	Team Jay
2	Kay Huang; Li Ronghao; Waa Wei; Miriam Yeung	Bruce Liang; Diamond Zhang; Zhang Lei; Zhou Shen	Sitar Tan; Jason Zhang	Cao Yang; Na Ying; Harlem Yu

== Coaches' teams ==
Winner
Runner-up
Third Place
Fourth Place
Fifth place
Sixth place

These are the contestants of each team who survived in the cross-battles (seasons 1–3), cross-knockouts (seasons 4–6), and knockouts (season 7), as well as their placements until the finale. Stolen artists are italicized.

Season	Team Jay Chou	Team Wang Feng	Team Na Ying	Team Harlem Yu
1	Nathan Hartono 向洋	Jiang Dunhao 蒋敦豪	Wang Chenrui 汪晨蕊	Yang Meina 杨美娜
1	Lokey 低调	Xu Geyang 徐歌阳	Jeryl Lee 李佩玲	Jike Hao 吉克皓
1	Yutian 羽田	Liu Wentian 刘文天	Su Lisheng 苏立生	Zhao Xiaoxi 赵小熙
2	Team Eason	Team Na Ying	Team Liu Huan	Team Jay Chou
2	Ye Xiaoyue 叶晓粤	Doris Guo 郭沁	Tashi Phuntsok 扎西平措	Joanna Dong 董姿彦
2	Xiao Kaiye 肖凯晔	Curley G 希林娜依·高	Zizi 子子	Darren 达布希勒图
2	Jeslyn Khoo 古洁縈	Leah Li 李雅	Hu Simo 胡斯默	Janice Tan 陈颖恩
2	Zhang Ze 张泽	Ye Xuanqing 叶炫清	Ji Hang 冀行	Olinda Cho 卓猷燕
2	Du Xingying 杜星萤			
2	Yan Jun 闫峻			
2	Yu Zibei 于梓贝			
3	Team Nicholas Tse	Team Jay Chou	Team Harlem Yu	Team Li Jian
3	Liu Junge 刘郡格	Su Han 宿涵	Li Zhenwu 黎真吾	Tenzin Nyima 旦增尼玛
3	Double Angel 打包安琪	Cering 周兴才让	Nigel Tay 郑伟杰	Kang Shulong 康树龙
3	Deng Zixiao 邓紫霄	Zhang Shen'er 张神儿	Huang Renqin 黄稔钦	Tiger 谭秋娟
3	Vash Hsu 徐暐翔		Suzanne Low 刘思延	
4	Team Li Ronghao	Team Harlem Yu	Team Na Ying	Team Wang Leehom
4	Xing Hanming 邢晗铭	Chen Qinan 陈其楠	Sidanmanchu 斯丹曼簇	Nasi Li 李芷婷
4	Li Fanyi 李凡一	Wang Shuai 汪帅	Jasmyn Aisin Gioro 爱新觉罗媚	Qu Yang 屈杨
4				Liu Meilin 刘美麟
4				Cui Jiaying 崔佳莹
4				Xiao Qiang 肖蔷
5	Team Nicholas Tse	Team Li Jian	Team Li Yuchun	Team Li Ronghao
5	Cao Yang 曹杨	Shan Yichun 单依纯	Pan Hong 潘虹	Zebra Forest 斑马森林
5	Fu Xinyao 傅欣瑶	Song Yuning 宋宇宁		Cheng Mohan 程墨寒
5	Jia Yiteng 贾翼腾	Su Wei 苏玮		
6	Team Hacken Lee	Team Wang Feng	Team Liao Changyong (Replace Na Ying)	Team Li Ronghao
6	Wu Keyue 伍珂玥	Yao Xiaotang 姚晓棠	Chen Wenfei 陈文非	Wang Jingwen 王靖雯
6	Kazu 贺三	Wang Xin 王馨	Zhang Luxin 张露馨	Wang Honghao 王泓昊
6		Zhuang Yuliang 壯煜亮		Yu Zibei 于梓贝
6		Tan Xuanyuan 谭轩辕		
7	Team Hacken Lee	Team Coco Lee (Replace Liao Changyong)	Team Fish Leong	Team Li Ronghao
7	Sumi Liang 梁玉莹	Wang Zepeng 王泽鹏	Pan Yunqi 潘韵淇	Claire Choi 蔡子伊
7	Ru Jin 茹今	Figo Zhou 周菲戈	Yang Can 杨灿	Li Chuchu 李楚楚
7	Yao Yusheng 姚宇笙		Burning Dolphins 灼海豚乐队	Zhang Yiwen 张艺雯
8	Team Henry Lau	Team Wakin Chau	Team Joker Xue	Team Wilber Pan
8	Current season			

== Series overview ==
- Team Jay Chou
- Team Na Ying
- Team Wang Feng
- Team Harlem Yu
- Team Eason Chan
- Team Liu Huan
- Team Li Jian
- Team Nicholas Tse
- Team Wang Leehom
- Team Li Ronghao
- Team Li Yuchun
- Team Hacken Lee
- Team Liao Changyong
- Team Coco Lee
- Team Fish Leong
- Team Zhang Bichen

Season	Aired	Winner	Runner-up	Other Finalists				Winning coach	Host(s)					Coaches (chair's order)				
Season	Aired	Winner	Runner-up	Other Finalists				Winning coach	Main	Specials		Finals		1	2	3	4	Comeback Stage
1	2016	Jiang Dunhao	Nathan Hartono	Wang Chenrui	Xu Geyang	Yang Meina	Jeryl Lee	Wang Feng	Li Yong	Yi Yi	Li Yong	Hu Qiaohua	Yi Yi	Jay Chou	Wang Feng	Na Ying	Harlem Yu	—
2	2017	Tashi Phuntsok	Doris Guo	Joanna Dong	Ye Xiaoyue	Xiao Kaiye		Liu Huan	Hu Qiaohua	Yi Yi	Shen Tao	Hu Qiaohua	Yi Yi	Eason Chan	Na Ying	Liu Huan	Jay Chou	—
3	2018	Tenzin Nyima	Li Zhenwu	Liu Junge	Su Han	Cering		Li Jian	Hu Qiaohua	Yi Yi	Rosy Luo	Hu Qiaohua	Yi Yi	Nicholas Tse	Jay Chou	Harlem Yu	Li Jian	—
4	2019	Xing Hanming	Sidanmanchu	Nasi Li		Chen Qinan		Li Ronghao	Hu Qiaohua, Yi Yi					Li Ronghao	Harlem Yu	Na Ying	Wang Leehom	—
5	2020	Shan Yichun	Zebra Forest	Pan Hong	Cao Yang	Song Yuning		Li Jian	Hu Qiaohua, Yi Yi					Nicholas Tse	Li Jian	Li Yuchun	Li Ronghao	—
6	2021	Wu Keyue	Wang Jingwen	Chen Wenfei	Yao Xiaotang	Kazu		Hacken Lee	Hu Qiaohua, Yi Yi					Hacken Lee	Wang Feng	Liao Changyong	Li Ronghao	—
7	2022	Sumi Liang	Claire Choi	Pan Yunqi	Wang Zepeng	Li Chuchu		Hacken Lee	Hu Qiaohua, Andy Lau					Hacken Lee	Coco Lee	Fish Leong	Li Ronghao	Huang Xiaoyun & Curley G.
8	2023	Season suspended							Hu Qiaohua					Henry Lau	Wakin Chau	Joker Xue	Wilber Pan	—
