= Yi Yi (actress) =

Chinese actress

- Born: 25 July 1989 (age 37); Yongzhou, Hunan, China
- Occupations: Actress; Host
- Years active: 2006–present

Chinese name
- Simplified Chinese: 伊一
Transcriptions
Standard Mandarin
- Hanyu Pinyin: Yī Yī

Yi Yi (Chinese: 伊一; born July 25, 1989, in Yongzhou, Hunan) is a Chinese actress and host.

== Personal life ==
Yi Yi started learning Latin Dance in 2001, when she studied in Zhejiang University of Media and Communications.

In 2006, she was invited to join Zhejiang Television.

== Filmography ==
=== Film ===
Year	Title	Chinese Title	Role	Notes
2013	Two Days Later			
2013	Modern Impression			
2015	Running Man	奔跑吧！兄弟	Herself	

=== Television ===
Year	Title	Role	Notes
2010	Such Marriage		
2012	Love in the Wartime		
2012	For the Sake of Beauty		
2013	Ex		
2013	Diors Man 2		
2014	Loving Dining Room		
2014	Illuminating as Sunshine		
2015	Diors Man 4		

=== Variety ===
Year	Title	Chinese Title	Role	Notes
2013	Generation Show		Guest	
2014	Running Man	奔跑吧兄弟	Guest	
2014	Simple Life		Host	
2014	So You Think You Can Dance	中国好舞蹈	Host	
2015	Charging Travel		Guest	
2015	Hidden Energy		Host	
2015	Wonderful Life		Host	
2015	Chef Nic	十二道鋒味	Guest	
2016	Beat the Champions		Guest	
2016	Cheers Science		Guest	
2016	Lost in Food		Host	
2016	Sing! China		Host	

== Awards and nominations ==
Year	Award	Category	Nominated work	Result
2012	2012 Macau International Movie and TV Festival	Best Host	—N/a	Won
2014	2014 Golden Eagle Awards	Best Host	—N/a	Won
