= Liao Changyong =

Chinese operatic baritone and academic (born 1968)

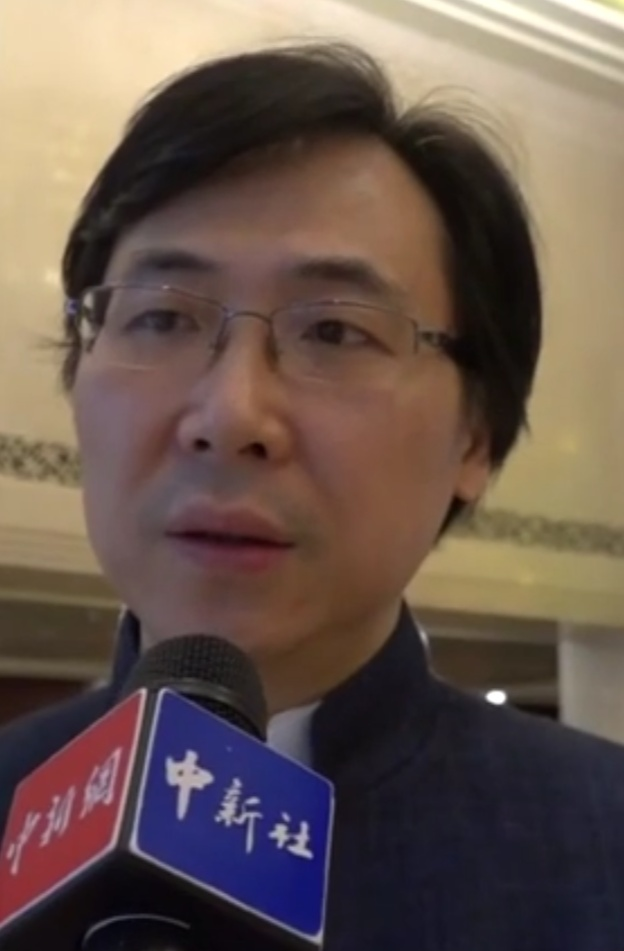
Liao in March 2019

Prof. Liao Changyong (Chinese: 廖昌永; born October 25, 1968), sometimes referred in English media as C. Y. Liao or Changyong Liao, is a Chinese operatic baritone and academic. He won first prize in three different international competitions in 1996 and 1997: Operalia; the French International Singing Competition of Toulouse; and the Queen Sonja Singing Competition. While his performance career has mainly been in China, he has appeared as a guest artist with opera companies and orchestras internationally. He is the president at the Shanghai Conservatory of Music.

== Life and career ==
Born in Pi County in the outskirts of Chengdu, Sichuan Province, Liao was trained by vocal pedagogue Zhou Xiaoyan and tenor Luo Wei at the Shanghai Conservatory of Music from which he graduated in 1995. In 1996 and 1997 he won three major international singing competitions which catapulted his career: Operalia, the French International Singing Competition of Toulouse, and the Queen Sonja Singing Competition. That same year he was a featured soloist in concert with the Oslo Philharmonic with Queen Sonja of Norway in attendance.

In 2000 Liao made his debut at the Washington National Opera as the Count di Luna in Verdi's Il trovatore at the Kennedy Center with Plácido Domingo conducting. In 2001 he portrayed Enzo in Attila with the Opera Orchestra of New York (OONY) at Carnegie Hall, and was heard again with that ensemble the following year as Captain Israele in Gaetano Donizetti's Marino Faliero. In 2002 he sang the role of Méphistophélès in Berlioz's La damnation de Faust with the China Philharmonic Orchestra. In 2003 he made his debut at the Dutch National Opera as the Japanese Prince in Tan Dun's Tea: A Mirror of Soul. That same year he made his debut with the Michigan Opera Theater as the Count di Luna, and was also seen with that company as Renato in Un ballo in maschera. In 2004 he sang the role of Pasha Seid in Verdi's Il corsaro with the OONY and Eve Queler conducting at Carnegie Hall.

In 2005 Liao portrayed the role of Renato to Claire Rutter's Amelia and Patrizia Patelmo's Ulrica for his debut at the Florida Grand Opera. In 2007 he sang the title role in Verdi's Rigoletto in Shanghai. In 2008 he was a featured soloist in the opening of the Beijing Music Festival. In 2010 he was a guest soloist in the New York Philharmonic's concert series "Concerts in the Park", performing Rossini arias with the Shanghai Symphony Orchestra. That same year he was the baritone soloist in Carl Orff's Carmina Burana with the Hong Kong Philharmonic Orchestra. He sang that work again in 2013 with the Sydney Symphony Orchestra under conductor Long Yu.

Liao has been a fixture in Western opera performances at the National Centre for the Performing Arts in Beijing for more than a decade. Recent appearances at that theater include Count Capulet in Roméo et Juliette (2005), Rodrigo in Don Carlo (2008), Giorgio Germont in La traviata (2011), Figaro in The Barber of Seville (2013), Count Ankarström in Un ballo in maschera (2013), Count Almaviva in The Marriage of Figaro (2015), and Vaskov in Kirill Molchanov's The Dawns Here Are Quiet (2015). He has also performed frequently at the Shanghai Grand Theatre, including a 2013 concert with pianist Lang Lang, and a performance at the 2015 Laureus World Sports Awards.

He also recorded full-length albums of Russian and Soviet classical songs.
