= Haman Hu =

- Born: 16 March 1981 (age 45); Hangzhou, Zhejiang, China
- Occupation: Host
- Years active: 2005 - present
- Spouse: Qin Lige (秦利鸽)
- Children: Mi Le (米乐), 2007 (age 18–19)

Chinese name
- Traditional Chinese: 胡喬華
- Simplified Chinese: 胡乔华
Transcriptions
Standard Mandarin
- Hanyu Pinyin: Hú Qiáohuá
- Musical career

Haman Hu (Chinese: 胡乔华; pinyin: Hú Qiáohuá), also known as Hua Shao (Chinese: 华少; pinyin: Húa Shào), is a Chinese television host. He is known for being the host of The Voice of China. and Sing! China

== Career ==
He was born in Hangzhou in 1981. He had autism in his childhood, which was attributed to growing up with a single parent. He went to Zhejiang Broadcasting University (浙江广播电视大学).

Hu went to Hangzhou People's Radio Station in 1999 and then he went to Zhejiang Television. He has been married and he has a son who is named "Mi Le", and his wife, Qin Lige is a TV director with Zhejiang Television.

He is known by Chinese as the fastest host in China.

== Hosting ==
- The Voice of China (Chinese: 中国好声音; pinyin: Zhōngguó Hǎo Shēngyīn)
- Chinese Dream Show (Chinese: 中国梦想秀; pinyin: Zhōngguó Mèngxiǎng Xiù)
- Do You Remember (Chinese: 我爱记歌词; pinyin: Wǒ Ài Jì Gēcí)
- Ai Chang Cai Hui Ying (Sing to Win) (Chinese: 爱唱才会赢; pinyin: Ài Chàng Cái Huì Yíng)
- Sound Of My Dream (Chinese: 梦想的声音; pinyin: Mèng Xiáng Dè Shēng Yíng)
- Chase Me (Chinese: 追我吧; pinyin: Zhui Wo Ba)

== Filmography ==
- Coward Hero (2019)
- Lost in Love (2019)
- You Are My Sunshine (2015)
- I Love You, Too. (2015)
- All You Need Is Love (2015)
