= Li Ronghao discography =

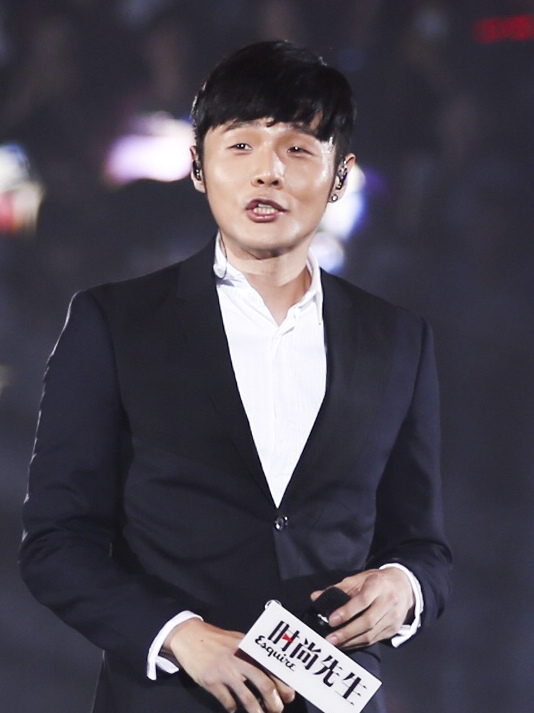
- Li in 2015
- Studio albums: 7
- EPs: 3
- Singles: 7
- Soundtracks: 11
- Promotional singles: 20

This is the discography of Chinese recording artist Li Ronghao (Chinese: 李荣浩). Li made his debut in September 2013 with the studio album Model. His 2016 single "Full House" from the album An Ideal was ranked number one on the year-end Billboard Radio China Top 10 Singles chart for 2016. In 2018, "If I Were Young" from the album Ear was ranked number eight on the year-end Billboard Radio China chart.

Li was named one of the global top 10 Mandopop artists of the year in 2023, while his single "The Dark Plum Sauce" from the album Free Soul (2022) was named the number one global Mandopop song of the year.

== Studio albums ==
List of studio albums, showing selected details, and sales figures
Title	Album details	Peak chart positions
Title	Album details	HK
Model (模特)	Released: September 16, 2013; Label: Linfair Records; Formats: CD, digital download, streaming; Track listing: 1. 李白 (Li Bai); 2. 模特 (Model); 3. 两个人 (Two of Us); 4. 太坦白 (Frankly); 5. 老伴 (Old Married Couple); 6. 演员和歌手 (Actor & Singer) feat. Chen Kun; 7. 都一样 (Both the Same); 8. 有一个姑娘 (There Is a Girl); 9. 蓝绿 (Blue & Green); 10. 拜拜 (Goodbye)	—
Ronghao Li (李荣浩)	Released: November 28, 2014; Label: Warner Records; Formats: CD, digital download, streaming; Track listing: 1. 喜剧之王 (King of Comedy); 2. 落俗 (Lacking Style); 3. 作曲家 (Composer); 4. 不搭 (Unsuited); 5. 自拍 (Autodyne); 6. 哎呀 (Ah!); 7. 快让我在雪地上撒点儿野 (Wild in the Snow); 8. 男女 (Man and Woman); 9. 天生 (Born); 10. 二三十 (20s 30s)	—
An Ideal	Released: January 22, 2016; Label: Warner Records; Formats: CD, digital download, streaming	—
En (嗯)	Released: November 17, 2017; Label: Warner Records; Formats: CD, digital download, streaming; Track listing: 1. 嗯 (En); 2. 就这样 (That Is It); 3. 裙姊 (Qun Zi); 4. 歌谣 (Ballad); 5. 我看着你的时候 (When I Look at You); 6. 祝你幸福 (Wish You Happiness); 7. 后羿 (Hou Yi); 8. 戒烟 (Quit Smoking); 9. 少年 (Teenager); 10. 不说 (Tacit)	—
Ear (耳朵)	Released: October 17, 2018; Label: Warner Records; Formats: CD, digital download, streaming; Track listing: 1. 王牌冤家 (Quarrelsome Lovers); 2. 念念又不忘 (Dwell on the Past); 3. 贫穷或富有 (Poverty or Wealth); 4. 乐团 (The Band); 5. 我知道是你 (I Know It's You); 6. 耳朵 (Ear); 7. 年少有为 (If I Were Young); 8. 成长之重量 (The Weight of Life); 9. 张家明和婉君 (Zhang Jiaming and Wan Jun); 10. 贝贝 (Babe)	5
Sparrow (麻雀)	Released: July 30, 2020; Label: Young Music; Formats: CD, digital download, streaming; Track listing: 1. 麻雀 (Sparrow); 2. 老友记 (Friends); 3. 等着等着就老了 (Wait Till Old); 4. 两个普普通通小青年 (Two Ordinary Youths) feat. Lexie Liu; 5. 同根 (Same Family); 6. 我爱你 (I Love You); 7. 花样年华 (In the Mood For Love); 8. 在一起嘛好不好 (Together); 9. 要我怎么办 (What Can I Do); 10. 如果我是海 (If I Were Sea)	7
Free Soul (纵横四海)	Released: December 21, 2022; Label: Young Music; Formats: CD, digital download, streaming; Track listing: 1. 纵横四海 (Free Soul); 2. 我们好好的 (We Suppose to Relish It); 3. 山川 (Mountain); 4. 情人 (Lover); 5. 对等关系 (Equivalence Relation) feat. A-Mei; 6. 脱胎换骨 (Reborn); 7. 习惯晚睡 (A Night Owl); 8. 获奖人 (And the Winner Is); 9. 乌梅子酱 (The Dark Plum Sauce); 10. 也许是爱情 (Perhaps Love)	—
The Dark Horse (黑马)	Released: October 18, 2024; Label: Young Music; Formats: CD, digital download, streaming; Track listing: 1. 名字 (Names); 2. 黑马 (Black Horse); 3. 另一端 (The Other Side); 4. 一百 (Everything); 5. 恋人 (Lovers); 6. 走走 (Wander); 7. 轻轻田园系 (Ordinary Love); 8. 海陆风 (Sea-Land Breeze); 9. 鸿门宴 (Hongmen Banquet); 10. 假面 (Mask)	—

== Extended plays ==
List of extended plays, showing selected details
Title	Album details
Stray (小黄)	Released: September 9, 2010; Label: Independent; Formats: CD, digital download, streaming; Track listing: 1. 小黄 (Stray); 2. 老街 (Old Street)
Composer (作曲家)	Released: March 24, 2014; Label: Simple Joy Music; Formats: CD, digital download, streaming; Track listing: 1. 作曲家 (Composer); 2. 哎呀 (Ah!)
iTunes Session	Released: February 17, 2015; Label: Warner Records; Formats: Digital download, streaming; Track listing: 1. 笑忘书 (Book of Laughter and Forgeting) / original singer: Faye Wong; 2. 不留 (Leave Nothing) / original singer: Faye Wong; 3. 出卖 (Betray) / original singer: Zhou Chuanxiong; 4. 有一个姑娘 (There Is a Girl) / original singer: Zhao Wei; 5. 催眠 (Hynosis) / original singer: Faye Wong; 6. 边走边唱 (Life on a String) / original singer: Huang Lei

== Singles ==
=== 2010s ===
List of 2010s singles, showing charts and associated album
Title	Year	Peak chart positions				Album
Title	Year	CHN Air. (Note: The Billboard Radio China chart operated from 2015 to 2019.)	CHN TME	CHN Top (Note: The Billboard China Top 100 chart operated from January to September 2019.)	SGP Reg.	Album
"行走的力量 (Power to Go)"	2015	—	—	—	—	Non-album single
"野生动物 (Wild Animals)"	2015	—	—	—	—	An Ideal
"满座 (Full House)"	2016	1	—	—	—	An Ideal
"優點 (Merit)"	2016	3	—	—	—	An Ideal
"不说 (Tacit)"	2016	8	—	—	—	En
"嗯 (En)"	2017	1	—	—	—	En
"就这样 (That Is It)"	2017	1	—	—	—	En
"裙姊 (Qun Zi)"	2017	—	—	—	—	En
"歌谣 (Ballad)"	2017	9	—	—	—	En
"我看着你的时候 (When I Look at You)"	2017	—	—	—	—	En
"祝你幸福 (Wish You Happiness)"	2017	—	—	—	—	En
"后羿 (Hou Yi)"	2017	—	—	—	—	En
"戒烟 (Quit Smoking)"	2017	1	—	—	—	En
"女儿国 (Daughter Country)" (featuring Jane Zhang)	2017	—	—	—	—	Non-album single
"成长之重量 (The Weight of Life)"	2018	—	—	—	—	Ear
"王牌冤家 (Quarrelsome Lovers)"	2018	4	—	—	—	Ear
"念念又不忘 (Dwell on the Past)"	2018	—	—	—	—	Ear
"年少有为 (If I Were Young)"	2018	1	—	21	10	Ear
"贫穷或富有 (Poverty or Wealth)"	2018	—	—	—	—	Ear
"张家明和婉君 (Zhang Jiaming and Wan Jun)"	2018	—	—	75	—	Ear
"耳朵 (Ear)"	2018	—	5	39	—	Ear
"麻雀 (Sparrow)"	2019	—	3	55	—	Sparrow
"老友记 (Friends)"	2019	—	54	—	—	Sparrow
"—" denotes releases that did not chart or chart did not exist.

=== 2020s ===
List of 2020s singles, showing charts and associated album
Title	Year	Peak chart positions				Album
Title	Year	CHN TME	MLY Chin.	SGP Reg.	TWN	Album
"两个普普通通小青年 (Two Ordinary Youths)" (featuring Lexie Liu)	2020	20	—	—	—	Sparrow
"等着等着就老了 (Wait Till Old)"	2020	5	—	—	—	Sparrow
"同根 (Same Family)"	2020	7	—	—	—	Sparrow
"在一起嘛好不好 (Together)"	2020	13	—	—	—	Sparrow
"我爱你 (I Love You)"	2020	17	—	—	—	Sparrow
"不遗憾 (No Regrets)"	2021	5	—	—	—	Non-album single
"纵横四海 (Free Soul)"	2021	28	—	—	—	Free Soul
"我们好好的 (We Suppose to Relish It)"	2021	18	—	—	—	Free Soul
"山川 (Mountain)"	2021	26	—	—	—	Free Soul
"情人 (Lover)"	2021	34	—	—	—	Free Soul
"对等关系 (Equivalence Relation)" (featuring A-Mei)	2021	27	—	—	18	Free Soul
"习惯晚睡 (A Night Owl)"	2022	—	—	—	—	Free Soul
"获奖人 (And the Winner Is)"	2022	—	—	—	—	Free Soul
"乌梅子酱 (The Dark Plum Sauce)"	2022	1	1	3	1	Free Soul
"—" denotes releases that did not chart or chart did not exist.
