= Sing! China season 4 =

Sing! China
- Season 4
- Hosted by: Hu Qiaohua; Yi Yi (backstage)
- Coaches: Na Ying; Harlem Yu; Li Ronghao; Wang Leehom
- Winner: Xing Hanming 邢晗铭
- Winning coach: Li Ronghao
- Runner-up: Sidanmanchu 斯丹曼簇

Release
- Original network: Zhejiang Television
- Original release: 19 July – 7 October 2019

Season chronology
- ← Previous; Season 3 Next → Season 5

The fourth season of the Chinese reality talent show Sing! China premiered on 19 July 2019, on Zhejiang Television. Harlem Yu returned as a coach for his third season. Na Ying, who last coached in the second season, returned with new coaches Li Ronghao and Wang Leehom, who all replaced Jay Chou, Li Jian and Nicholas Tse as coaches. On 7 October, Xing Hanming (邢晗铭) of Team Ronghao was announced as the winner of the season, making her the first female winner of Sing! China. This also marked Ronghao's first win as coach. Sidanmanchu 斯丹曼簇 of Team Na Ying, Nasi Li (李芷婷) of Team Leehom, and Chen Qinan (陈其楠) of Team Harlem finished runner-up, third, and fourth places, respectively. This marks the first instance of the Top 3 artists being all female.

== Coaches and hosts ==
Sing! China season 4 coaches

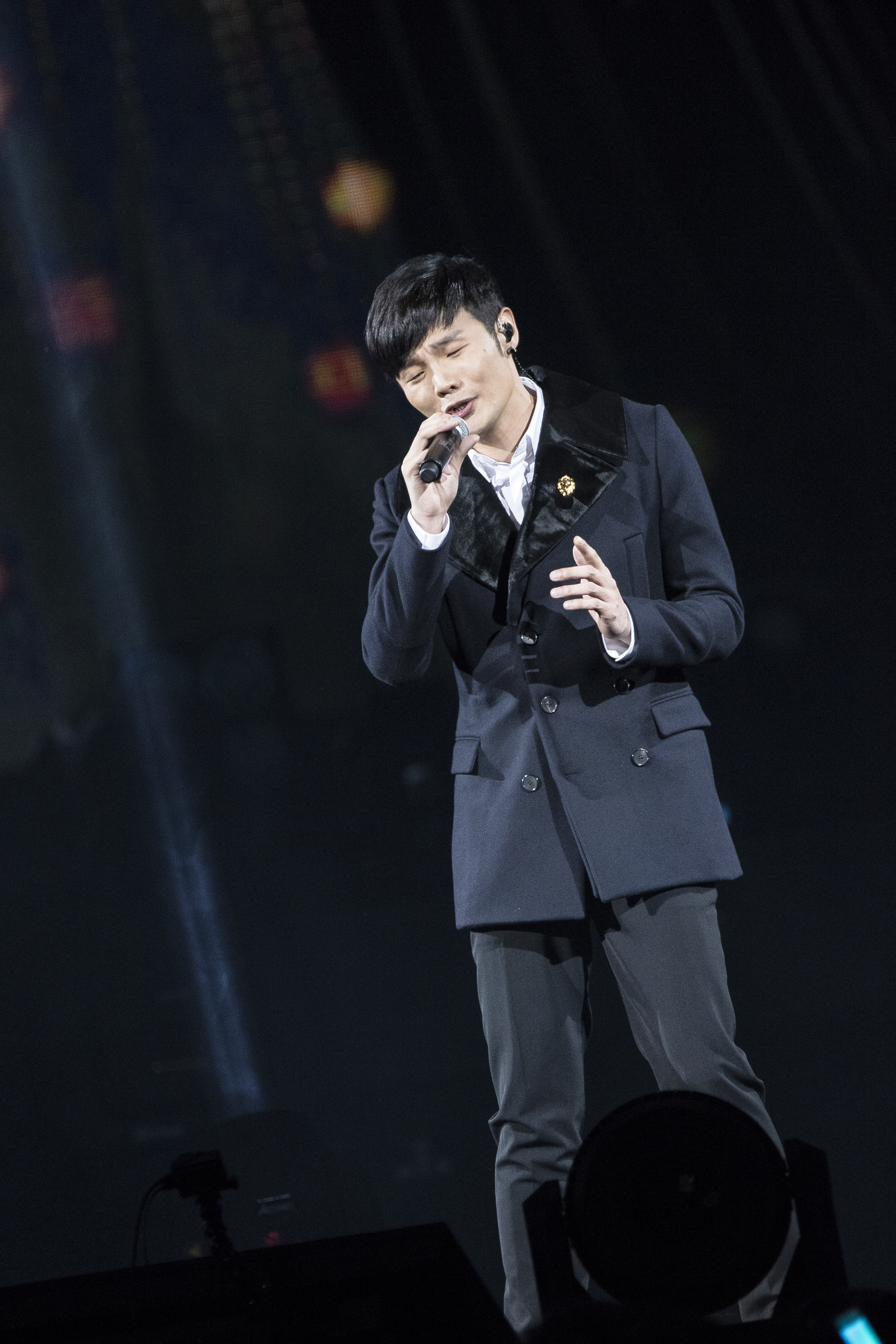
Li Ronghao

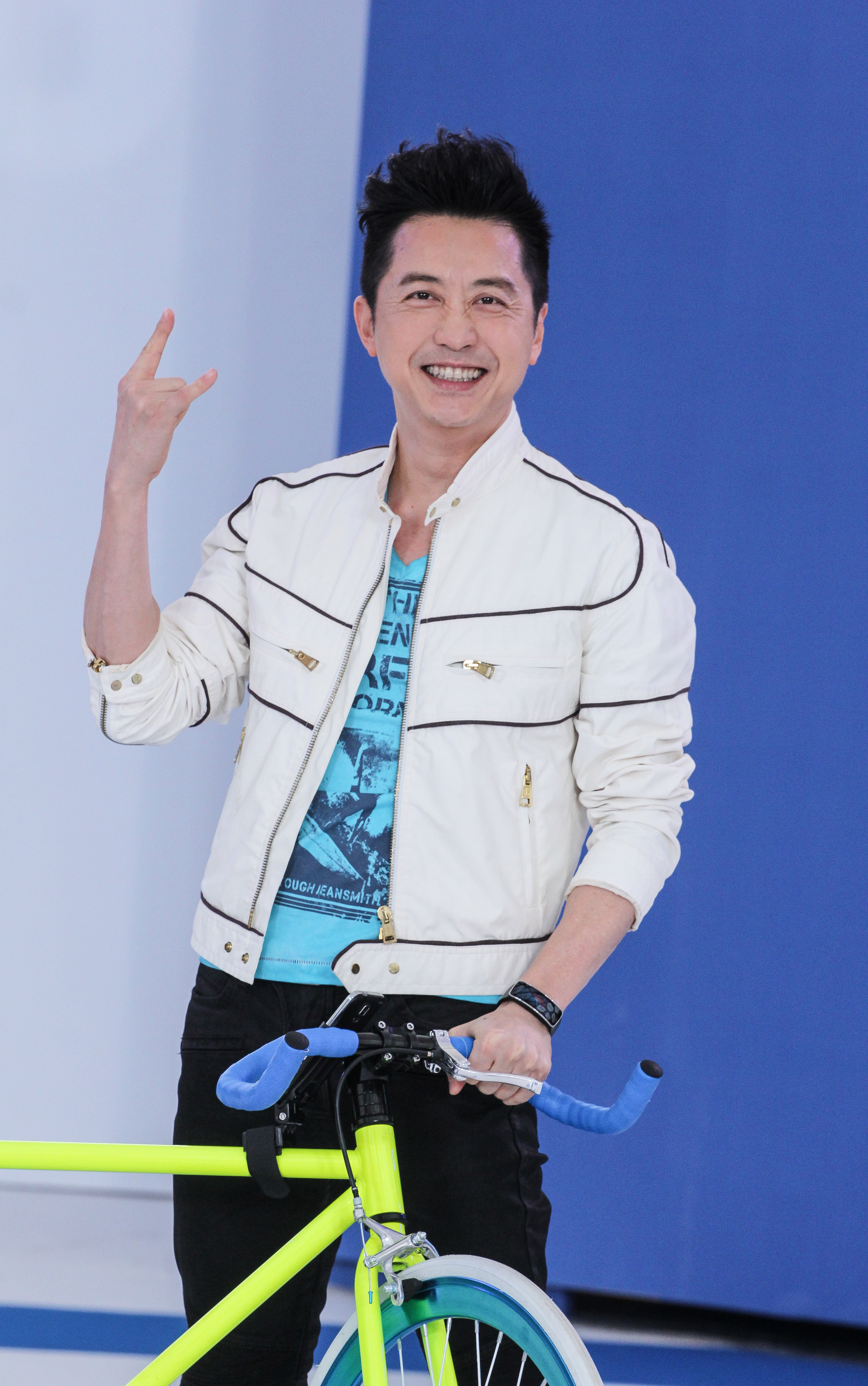
Harlem Yu

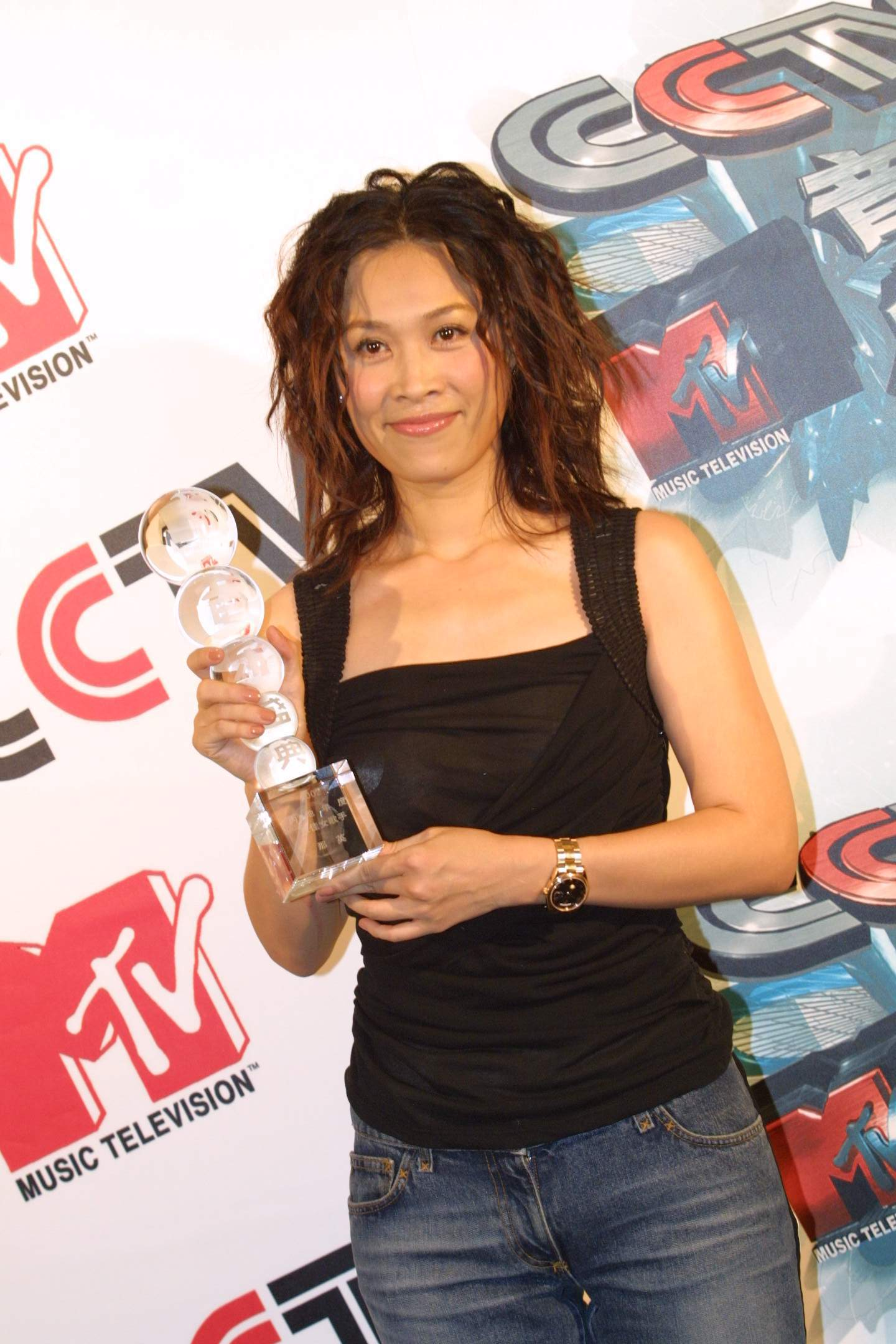
Na Ying

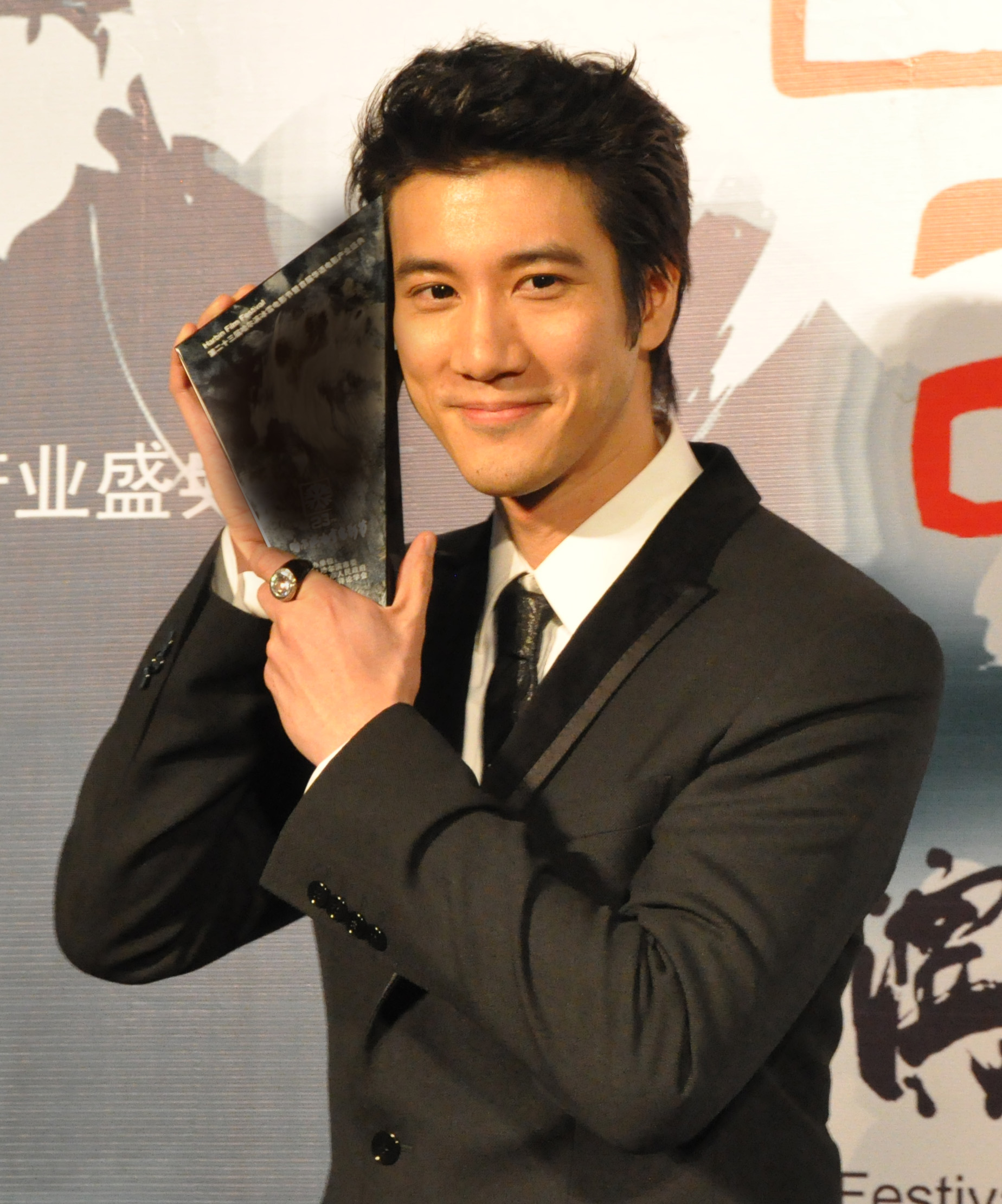
Wang Leehom

== Teams ==
Colour key

- Winner
- Runner-up
- Third place
- Fourth place
- Eliminated in the Playoffs
- Eliminated in the Cross Knockout rounds
- Eliminated before the Cross Knockout rounds
- Eliminated in the Cross Battle rounds
- Withdrew

Coaches	Top 48 artists			
Li Ronghao				
Li Ronghao	Xing Hanming 邢晗铭	Li Fanyi 李凡一	Chen Xiaotong 陈小同	Luo Lei 骆蕾
Li Ronghao	Hu Rui 胡睿	Liu Jiaqi 刘佳琪	You Bowen 由博文	Dora Hsu 徐丹丹
Li Ronghao	Liu Minxuan 刘珉轩	He Lei 何磊	Ji Hu 吉胡	Tian Ying 田颖
Harlem Yu				
Harlem Yu	Chen Qinan 陈其楠	Wang Shuai 汪帅	Jia Zheng 贾铮	Chen Runqiu 陈润秋
Harlem Yu	Yao Fei 姚斐	Dolma Intshok 卓玛殷措	Zhang Peng 张鹏	
Na Ying				
Na Ying	Sidanmanchu 斯丹曼簇	Jasmyn Aisin Gioro 爱新觉罗媚	Zhang Tianyu 张天予	Su Yang 苏洋
Na Ying	Annabella Chua 蔡咏琪	Yang Yige 杨一歌	Li Lun 李伦	Cui Yi 崔一
Na Ying	Guo Hao 郭皓	Kim Jin 金国宪	Chang Hong 常虹	Jisashama 吉萨莎玛
Na Ying	Selina Ma 马杰雪			
Wang Leehom				
Wang Leehom	Nasi Li 李芷婷	Qu Yang 屈杨	Liu Meilin 刘美麟	Cui Jiaying 崔佳莹
Wang Leehom	Xiao Qiang 肖蔷	CPU	Andy Lin 林言奕	Harry Hong 洪雨雷
Wang Leehom	Sujane 以格	Yang Moyi 杨默依	Wang Wenfang 王文芳	Sun Zhenyu 孙振宇
Wang Leehom	Tenzin Dolkar 旦增卓嘎	Wang San 王三	Nicole Lai 赖淞凤	Luo Yubin 罗煜斌

== Blind auditions ==
Similar from the previous season, the blind auditions would see the coaches listening to the contestants' performances while they faced away from the stage. If they like what they hear from a contestant, they press the button on their chairs which would rotate them to face the stage. This signifies that the contestant has been recruited to join the respective coach's team. If more than one coach presses their button, the contestant would then choose the coach they want to work with. If none of the coaches presses their button, the losing artist would leave the stage straight away, without any conversations with the coaches, and the chairs would remain unturned (though this rule could be reversed upon request from the coaches). The performance order during the blind auditions would be decided on the spot by the coaches. The coaches would be given a list of songs which the artists would be performing, and the coaches would take turn to pick the songs which they would like to hear first, and the respective artist would be called upon the stage to perform the song. Therefore, the artists would only be notified of their performance order minutes before their performances. Before the artists perform, they would each select a coach which they would like to work with the most, and the coach's head shot would be shown in real-time on the large screen attached to their respective chairs during their performance. This allows the artists to see how their preferred coaches are reacting to their performances while the latter is facing away from the stage, thus potentially influencing the artist's final choice of coach.

In this season, a new feature named as the "mute-the-mic" button was added during the blind auditions. This allows the coaches to block one coach from pitching to an artist by having the particular coach's chair faced away from the stage and muting their personal microphone. Despite the block, the coach would still be available for selection by the artist as their coach. Unlike the previous season, there is no limit in the number of artists that can be recruited on a team.

Colour key

	Coach picked this artist to perform (via artist's song choice)
	Artist selected this coach as their preferred coach before performance
✔	Coach pressed their button
	Artist defaulted to this coach's team
	Artist elected to join this coach's team
	Artist eliminated with no coach pressing the button
✘	Coach pressed their button, but was later blocked by Ronghao from pitching to the artist
✘	Coach pressed their button, but was later blocked by Harlem from pitching to the artist
✘	Coach pressed their button, but was later blocked by Na Ying from pitching to the artist
✘	Coach pressed their button, but was later blocked by Leehom from pitching to the artist

=== Episode 1 (19 July) ===
The four coaches performed a medley of each other's songs – Li Ronghao performed Wang Leehom's "Kiss Goodbye", Wang performed Na Ying's "梦一场", Na performed Harlem Yu's "改变所有的错", and Yu performed "龙的传人". All coaches later joined forces and performed a remixed version of "龙的传人".

Order	Artist	Age	Hometown	Song	Coach's and artist's choices			
Order	Artist	Age	Hometown	Song	Ronghao	Harlem	Na Ying	Leehom
1	Cui Jiaying 崔佳莹	28	Langfang, Hebei	"我敢"	✔	✔	✘	✔
2	Harry Hong 洪雨雷	22	Changsha, Hunan	"模范情书"	✔	—	—	✔
3	Samingad 纪晓君	41	Beinan, Taitung	"偶然"	—	—	—	—
4	Selina Ma 马杰雪	18	Altay, Xinjiang	"太阳"	—	✔	✔	✔
5	Xing Hanming 邢晗铭	19	Wenzhou, Zhejiang	"得知平淡珍贵的一天"	✔	—	—	✔
6	Zhang Tianyu 张天予	22	Baicheng, Jilin	"想你"	✘	—	✔	✔

=== Episode 2 (26 July) ===
Order	Artist	Age	Hometown	Song	Coach's and artist's choices			
Order	Artist	Age	Hometown	Song	Ronghao	Harlem	Na Ying	Leehom
1	Liu Meilin 刘美麟	24	Harbin, Heilongjiang	"来不及勇敢"	—	—	—	✔
2	He Lei 何磊	19	Luzhou, Sichuan	"我们的总和"	✔	—	—	—
3	Nasi Li 李芷婷	18	Taichung, Taiwan	"你敢不敢"	—	—	✔	✔
4	Jisashama 吉萨莎玛	25	Lijiang, Yunnan	"等风来"	✔	✔	✔	✘
5	Chang Hong 常虹	32	Daqing, Heilongjiang	"下雪哈尔滨"	—	—	✔	✔
6	Sujane 以格	30	Malaysia	"Forever Love"	—	—	✔	✔
7	Liu Minxuan 刘珉轩	21	Changsha, Hunan	"肆意的河"	✔	✔	✔	✔
8	Yang Moyi 杨默依	22	Beijing	"This Is Me"	—	—	✔	✔
9	Zhang Peng 张鹏	40	Xinxiang, Henan	"大江东去"	—	✔	—	✔

=== Episode 3 (2 August) ===
Order	Artist	Age	Hometown	Song	Coach's and artist's choices			
Order	Artist	Age	Hometown	Song	Ronghao	Harlem	Na Ying	Leehom
1	Dora Hsu 徐丹丹^{1}	26	Taipei, Taiwan	"忍不住想念"	✔	—	—	—
2	Jia Zheng 贾峥	21	Yixing, Jiangsu	"I Will Be Fine"	—	✔	—	✔
3	Sidanmanchu 斯丹曼簇	19	Ngawa, Sichuan	"忘我"	—	✔	✘ ✔	—
4	Li Fanyi 李凡一	19	Taizhou, Zhejiang	"踮起脚尖爱"	✔	—	✔	✔
5	Jasmyn Aisin Gioro 爱新觉罗媚	18	Manchester, United Kingdom	"中国姑娘"	—	✔	✔	—
6	Liu Jiaqi 刘佳琪	23	Shenyang, Liaoning	"也罢"	✔	✔	✔	✔
7	Cui Yi 崔一	30	Yanbian, Jilin	"远方"	✔ ^{2}	✔ ^{2}	✔ ^{2}	✔
8	Kim Jin 金国宪	32	Yanbian, Jilin	"出城"	✔	—	✔	—

1. Not broadcast fully.
2. Button was pressed by Wang Leehom.

=== Episode 4 (9 August) ===
Order	Artist	Age	Hometown	Song	Coach's and artist's choices			
Order	Artist	Age	Hometown	Song	Ronghao	Harlem	Na Ying	Leehom
1	Luo Yubin 罗煜斌^{1}	23	Puning, Jieyang, Guangdong	"我完全没有任何理由理你"	—	—	—	✔
2	Wang Wenfang 王文芳^{2}	30	Taiyuan, Shanxi	"孤独的自由"	—	—	—	✔
3	Sun Zhenyu 孙振宇^{3}	21	Bozhou, Anhui	"对他说我愿意"	—	—	—	✔
4	Chen Qinan 陈其楠^{4}	20	Fuzhou, Fujian	"未来"	—	✔	—	—
5	Tian Ying 田颖^{5}	23	Tangshan, Hebei	"寂寞难耐"	✔	—	—	—
6	Dolma Intshok 卓玛殷措	19	Kangding, Sichuan	"爱是怀疑"	—	✔	✔	—
7	Yang Yige 杨一歌	24	Shenyang, Liaoning	"小小"	—	✔	✔	—
8	Qu Yang 屈杨	29	Hohhot, Inner Mongolia	"有一种悲伤"	—	—	✔	✘ ✔
9	CPU (Flow Keyz 曾汉林 & Christy Peng 彭雅纯)	23 / 22	Australia / Wuhan, Hubei	"玫瑰玫瑰我爱你"	—	✔	—	✔
10	Xiao Qiang 肖蔷	24	Hengyang, Hunan	"无问西东"	—	—	✔	✔
11	Chen Xiaotong 陈小同	25	Shenzhen, Guangdong	"贫穷或富有"	✔	—	—	—
12	You Bowen 由博文	19	Daqing, Heilongjiang	"Simon"	✔	✔	—	✔

1. Not broadcast fully.

=== Episode 5 (16 August) ===
Order	Artist	Age	Hometown	Song	Coach's and artist's choices			
Order	Artist	Age	Hometown	Song	Ronghao	Harlem	Na Ying	Leehom
1	Wang Shuai 汪帅^{3}	18	Suqian, Jiangsu	"喝酒Blues"	—	✔	—	—
2	Chen Runqiu 陈润秋^{3}	25	Dongshan Island, Zhangzhou, Fujian	"优美的低于生活"	—	✔	—	—
3	Su Yang 苏洋^{3}	23	Longyan, Fujian	"惯性取暖"	—	—	✔	—
4	Annabella Chua 蔡咏琪^{3}	18	Kota Tinggi, Johor, Malaysia	"真的傻"	—	—	✔	—
5	Nicole Lai 赖淞凤^{3}	29	Malaysia	"保留"	—	—	—	✔
6	Ji Hu 吉胡^{3}	31	Chengdu, Sichuan	"我爱你，再见"	✔	—	—	—
7	Hu Rui 胡睿^{3}	23	Wuhan, Hubei	"半句再见"	✔	—	—	—
8	Andy Lin 林言奕^{3}	22	Taiwan	"美丽"	—	—	—	✔
9	Wang Xian 王弦^{3}	29	Yinchuan, Ningxia	"她她她"	—	—	—	—
10	Zhang Ruiheng 张睿衡^{3}	21	Jingmen, Hubei	"都是你害的"	—	—	—	—
11	Yao Fei 姚斐	41	Shanghai	"Mustang Sally"	—	✔	✔	—
12	Guo Hao 郭皓	26	Jiutai, Changchun, Jilin	"寂寞先生"	✘	✔	✔	✔
13	Tenzin Dolkar 旦增卓嘎	23	Lhasa, Tibet	"时光谣"	✔	—	✘	✔
14	Wang San 王三	45	Rizhao, Shandong	"下坠"	—	✔	—	✔
15	Luo Lei 骆蕾	24	Chengdu, Sichuan	"有一块青苔很明显"	✔	—	—	✔
16	Li Lun 李伦	25	Ludian, Zhaotong, Yunnan	"不能没有你"	—	—	✔	✔

1. Not broadcast fully.

== The Cross Battles ==
The four mentors are divided into two groups for a duel. The teams of the two main battle instructors are divided into four or five rounds to decide the winner, with the winning team receiving one point and the losing team receiving no points. Each coach has a one-time bonus point (via the coach's trump card) that can be used on any artist on his team. If that artist who was given the coach's trump card wins the duel, he or she will receive two points, otherwise he will still not receive points. The team with the highest points wins and all of his/her artists will advance to the next card, while the losing coach will eliminate two artists from his/her team as a punishment.

In episode 8, the winning coaches from episode 6 and 7 had a duel and the same rules apply in this round.

Colour key

	Artist was given the coach's trump card
	Artist won the Cross Battle (one or two points allocated to the team)
	Artist lost the Cross Battle (no points allocated to the team)
	Team won the Cross Battles with highest winning points
✔	Artist advanced to the Cross Knockouts
✘	Artist was eliminated by coach

Episode	Coach	Order	Artist	Song	Panel votes	Coach votes				Total votes	Result
Episode	Coach	Order	Artist	Song	Panel votes	Ronghao	Harlem	Na Ying	Leehom	Total votes	Result
Episode 6 (23 August)											
Episode 6 (23 August)	Wang Leehom	1.1	Wang Wenfang 王文芳✔	"一样的月光"	16	—	✔	✔	—	26	
Episode 6 (23 August)	Li Ronghao	1.2	Liu Jiaqi 刘佳琪✔	"散了吧"	35	—	—	—	—	35	+1
Episode 6 (23 August)	Wang Leehom	2.1	Qu Yang 屈杨✔	"依然爱你"	40	—	—	✔	—	45	+1
Episode 6 (23 August)	Li Ronghao	2.2	Luo Lei 骆蕾✔	"小半"	11	—	✔	—	—	16	
Episode 6 (23 August)	Li Ronghao	3.1	Li Fanyi 李凡一✔	"你的酒馆对我打了烊"	38	—	—	✔	—	43	+1
Episode 6 (23 August)	Wang Leehom	3.2	Harry Hong 洪雨雷✔	"流星雨"	13	—	✔	—	—	18	
Episode 6 (23 August)	Wang Leehom	4.1	Nasi Li 李芷婷✔	"流沙"	32	—	✔	—	—	37	+1
Episode 6 (23 August)	Li Ronghao	4.2	Hu Rui 胡睿✔	"爱错"	19	—	—	✔	—	24	
Episode 6 (23 August)	Li Ronghao	5.1	Xing Hanming 邢晗铭 ✔	"疯子"	32	—	✔	✔	—	42	+2
Episode 6 (23 August)	Wang Leehom	5.2	Sujane 以格 ✔	"I'm not a star"	19	—	—	—	—	19	
Episode 7 (30 August)											
Episode 7 (30 August)	Harlem Yu	1.1	Chen Qinan 陈其楠✔	"拿走了什么"	36	—	—		✔	41	+1
Episode 7 (30 August)	Na Ying	1.2	Jasmyn Aisin Gioro 爱新觉罗媚✔	"长腿叔叔"	15	✔	—		—	20	
Episode 7 (30 August)	Na Ying	2.1	Jisashama 吉萨莎玛✔	"淺淺"	40	✔	—		—	45	+1
Episode 7 (30 August)	Harlem Yu	2.2	Zhang Peng 张鹏✔	"离歌"	11	—	—		✔	16	
Episode 7 (30 August)	Harlem Yu	3.1	Wang Shuai 汪帅✔	"走钢索的人"	28	✔	—		✔	38	+1
Episode 7 (30 August)	Na Ying	3.2	Annabella Chua 蔡咏琪✔	"回忆见"	23	—	—		—	23	
Episode 7 (30 August)	Na Ying	4.1	Sidanmanchu 斯丹曼簇✔	"我的名字"	10	—	—		—	10	
Episode 7 (30 August)	Harlem Yu	4.2	Jia Zheng 贾铮 ✔	"恋人未满"	41	✔	—		✔	51	+2
Episode 8 (6 September)											
Episode 8 (6 September)	Harlem Yu	1.1	Chen Runqiu 陈润秋✔	"都挺好"	35	—		✔	✔	45	+1
Episode 8 (6 September)	Li Ronghao	1.2	Tian Ying 田颖✔	"大江东去"	16	—		—	—	16	
Episode 8 (6 September)	Li Ronghao	2.1	Liu Jiaqi 刘佳琪✔	"曲終人散"	28	—		—	✔	33	+1
Episode 8 (6 September)	Harlem Yu	2.2	Zhang Peng 张鹏 ✘	"走着走着就散了"	23	—		✔	—	28	
Episode 8 (6 September)	Harlem Yu	3.1	Dolma Intshok 卓玛殷措✘	"星晴"	6	—		—	—	6	
Episode 8 (6 September)	Li Ronghao	3.2	Xing Hanming 邢晗铭 ✔	"你啊你啊"	45	—		✔	✔	55	+2
Episode 8 (6 September)	Harlem Yu	4.1	Chen Qinan 陈其楠✔	"Loving you"	31	—		—	✔	36	+1
Episode 8 (6 September)	Li Ronghao	4.2	Li Fanyi 李凡一✔	"亲爱的那不是爱情"	20	—		✔	—	25	
Episode 8 (6 September)	Harlem Yu	5.1	Yao Fei 姚斐✔	"爱上疯狂的节奏"	33	—		✔	✔	43	+1
Episode 8 (6 September)	Li Ronghao	5.2	You Bowen 由博文✔	"当年情"	18	—		—	—	18	
Episode 8 (6 September)	Li Ronghao	6.1	Luo Lei 骆蕾✔	"野薔薇"	35	—		—	—	35	+1
Episode 8 (6 September)	Harlem Yu	6.2	Chen Runqiu 陈润秋✔	"第一个清晨"	16	—		✔	✔	26	

== The Cross Knockouts ==
Before the Cross Knockout, each coach has to eliminate half of his/her teammates, which means team Ronghao, team Harlem, team Na Ying, and team Leehom will remain six, six, three, and seven artists, respectively. Besides, the "Block" is allowed for coaches in this round to avoid some artists have to compete with the strongest artist on each team. The artist will perform based on the ascending of coaches by draw, and he/she will decide his/her opponent by draw as well. If the artist is used the "Block" by the coach, which means he/she may not face a certain artist from another team by default. At the end of each Cross Knockout, the two artists will receive votes of approval from a 51-person judging panel. The artist with the most votes will advance to the Playoffs, while the other would be eliminated.

Colour key

Artist won the Cross Knockout and advanced to the Playoffs
Artist lost the Cross Knockout and was eliminated

Episode	Coach	Order	Artist	Song	Panel votes	Result	"Block" result				Blocked artist
Episode	Coach	Order	Artist	Song	Panel votes	Result	Ronghao	Harlem	Na Ying	Leehom	Blocked artist
Episode 10 (13 September)											
Episode 10 (13 September)	Li Ronghao	1.1	Liu Jiaqi 刘佳琪	"放手去爱"	6	Eliminated	—	—	—	—	—
Episode 10 (13 September)	Harlem Yu	1.2	Chen Qinan 陈其楠	"你等我"	45	Advanced	—	—	—	—	—
Episode 10 (13 September)	Na Ying	2.1	Yang Yige 杨一歌	"南海姑娘"	6	Eliminated	—	—	—	—	—
Episode 10 (13 September)	Li Ronghao	2.2	Xing Hanming 邢晗铭	"儿歌"	45	Advanced	—	—	—	—	—
Episode 10 (13 September)	Wang Leehom	3.1	Xiao Qiang 肖蔷	"执迷不悔"	42	Advanced	—	—	—	✔	Li Fanyi 李凡一
Episode 10 (13 September)	Li Ronghao	3.2	Hu Rui 胡睿	"柠檬草的味道"	9	Eliminated	—	—	—	Block used	—
Episode 10 (13 September)	Harlem Yu	4.1	Jia Zheng 贾铮	"就是现在"	15	Eliminated	—	✔	—	Block used	Nasi Li 李芷婷
Episode 10 (13 September)	Wang Leehom	4.2	Liu Meilin 刘美麟	"时候"	36	Advanced	—	Block used	—	Block used	—
Episode 10 (13 September)	Li Ronghao	5.1	Luo Lei 骆蕾	"时间里的飞人"	23	Eliminated	✔	Block used	—	Block used	Sidanmanchu 斯丹曼簇
Episode 10 (13 September)	Na Ying	5.2	Jasmyn Aisin Gioro 爱新觉罗媚	"暧昧"	28	Advanced	Block used	Block used	—	Block used	—
Episode 11 (20 September)											
Episode 11 (20 September)	Na Ying	1.1	Su Yang 苏洋	"不散的筵席"	10	Eliminated	Block used	Block used	—	Block used	—
Episode 11 (20 September)	Wang Leehom	1.2	Qu Yang 屈杨	"父親寫的散文詩"	41	Advanced	Block used	Block used	—	Block used	—
Episode 11 (20 September)	Wang Leehom	2.1	Andy Lin 林言奕	"幻聽"	9	Eliminated	Block used	Block used	—	Block used	—
Episode 11 (20 September)	Li Ronghao	2.2	Li Fanyi 李凡一	"第一次"	42	Advanced	Block used	Block used	—	Block used	—
Episode 11 (20 September)	Harlem Yu	3.1	Wang Shuai 汪帅	"走西口"	40	Advanced	Block used	Block used	—	Block used	—
Episode 11 (20 September)	Li Ronghao	3.2	Chen Xiaotong 陈小同	“我們都傻"	11	Eliminated	Block used	Block used	—	Block used	—
Episode 11 (20 September)	Na Ying	4.1	Annabella Chua 蔡咏琪	"晚安晚安"	20	Eliminated	Block used	Block used	—	Block used	—
Episode 11 (20 September)	Wang Leehom	4.2	Nasi Li 李芷婷	"你是愛我的"	31	Advanced	Block used	Block used	—	Block used	—
Episode 11 (20 September)	Wang Leehom	5.1	CPU	"愛的初體驗"	11	Eliminated	Block used	Block used	—	Block used	—
Episode 11 (20 September)	Na Ying	5.2	Sidanmanchu 斯丹曼簇	"水妖"	40	Advanced	Block used	Block used	—	Block used	—
Episode 11 (20 September)	Na Ying	6.1	Zhang Tianyu 张天予	"自己"	17	Eliminated	Block used	Block used	—	Block used	—
Episode 11 (20 September)	Wang Leehom	6.2	Cui Jiaying 崔佳莹	"我懷念的"	34	Advanced	Block used	Block used	—	Block used	—

== The Playoffs ==
The Top 11 performed in the Playoffs for a spot in the finals. The selection of the winner may be different, depending on which team the artist belongs to. For Team Na Ying and Team Harlem, the remaining two artists will perform a song respectively, and their coaches will choose one as their winners. For Team Ronghao, the coach assigned his teammates have a duo, and the coach has to choose one of them as a winner, which is similar to the Battles of The Voice series. For Team Leehom, since five artists advance to the Playoff, the selection of finalists is divided into two parts. Five artists will perform a solo song, and two will advance to the second round. This selection method is similar to the six-chair challenge of The X Factor series. The rule of the second round is same as Team Na Ying and Team Harlem.

Episode	Coach	Order	Artist	Song	Result	Switched with (for team Leehom only)
Episode 12 (27 September)						
Episode 12 (27 September)	Li Ronghao	1	Xing Hanming 邢晗铭	"流行歌曲"	Advanced	—
Episode 12 (27 September)	Li Ronghao	1	Li Fanyi 李凡一	"流行歌曲"	Eliminated	—
Episode 12 (27 September)	Wang Leehom	2	Cui Jiaying 崔佳莹	"是日救星"	Eliminated	—
Episode 12 (27 September)	Wang Leehom	3	Liu Meilin 刘美麟	"已来不及"	Eliminated	—
Episode 12 (27 September)	Wang Leehom	4	Xiao Qiang 肖蔷	"寻人启事"	Eliminated	—
Episode 12 (27 September)	Wang Leehom	5	Qu Yang 屈杨	"带我走"	Advanced to Round 2	Cui Jiaying 崔佳莹
Episode 12 (27 September)	Wang Leehom	6	Nasi Li 李芷婷	"黑色柳丁"	Advanced to Round 2	Liu Meilin 刘美麟
Episode 12 (27 September)	Wang Leehom	Round 2				—
Episode 12 (27 September)	Wang Leehom	7	Qu Yang 屈杨	"拆穿"	Eliminated	—
Episode 12 (27 September)	Wang Leehom	8	Nasi Li 李芷婷	"一直走"	Advanced	—
Episode 13 (30 September)						
Episode 13 (30 September)	Na Ying	1	Jasmyn Aisin Gioro 爱新觉罗媚	"Melody"	Eliminated	—
Episode 13 (30 September)	Na Ying	2	Sidanmanchu 斯丹曼簇	"我看我自己"	Advanced	—
Episode 13 (30 September)	Harlem Yu	3	Wang Shuai 汪帅	"危險"	Eliminated	—
Episode 13 (30 September)	Harlem Yu	4	Chen Qinan 陈其楠	"如果你愛我"	Advanced	—

Non-competition performances
Order	Performers	Song
12.1	Li Ronghao & his team (Xing Hanming 邢晗铭 & Li Fanyi 李凡一)	"黄种人"
12.2	Wang Leehom & his team (李芷婷, Liu Meilin 刘美麟, 崔佳莹, Qu Yang 屈杨 & Xiao Qiang 肖蔷)	"华人万岁"
13.1	Na Ying & her team (Jasmyn Aisin Gioro 爱新觉罗媚 & Sidanmanchu 斯丹曼簇)	"我和我的祖国"
13.2	Harlem Yu & his team (Chen Qinan 陈其楠 & Wang Shuai 汪帅)	"蜗牛"

== Finals ==
The Top 4 performed live in a two-part season finale on 7 October, held at the Beijing National Stadium. In the first round of the competition, the four finalists performed a duet with their coach, and a solo song. Based on the public votes received from the live audience at the end of the first round, the bottom two artists with the fewest votes would be eliminated.

The final two artists would then sing their winner's song before an 81-person panel and live audience, who will vote for the winner at the end of the performances. Every member of the panel would be entitled to one vote, and the total number of votes received by the artists from the panel and live audience would be converted into percentage points accordingly. The artist who received the highest number of points would be announced as the winner.

Coach	Artist	Round 1					Round 2					Result
Coach	Artist	Order	Duet song (with coach)	Order	Solo song	Public votes	Order	Winner's song	Panel votes	Public votes (points)	Total points	Result
Wang Leehom	Nasi Li 李芷婷	1	"缘分一道桥"	5	"画"	20,366	N/A (already eliminated)					Third place
Na Ying	Sidanmanchu 斯丹曼簇	2	"岁月"	6	"生如夏花"	23,370	9	"一颗星的夜"	30	12,328／40%	70	Runner-up
Ronghao Li	Xing Hanming 邢晗铭	3	"浣溪沙"	7	"寂寞的恋人啊"	28,018	10	"浮夸"	51	18,619／60%	111	Winner
Harlem Yu	Chen Qinan 陈其楠	4	"春泥"	8	"年轻的战场"	16,621	N/A (already eliminated)					Fourth place

Non-competition performances
Order	Performer(s)	Song
1	The Top 22	"我的祖国"
2	Team Ronghao (Winner of Cross Battles)	"年少有为"
3	Cui Jiaying 崔佳莹 & Zhou Shen 周深	"我爱你中国"

== Non-competition shows ==
=== The Mid-Autumn Special (12 September) ===
The ninth episode was a two-hour special aired on 12 September, featuring performances by the coaches and artists in celebration of the Mid-Autumn Festival. The episode was hosted by Yi Yi.

Episode	Order	Performer(s)	Song
Episode 9 (12 September)	1	Harlem Yu	"猴Lonely"
Episode 9 (12 September)	2	Ronghao Li	"耳朵"
Episode 9 (12 September)	3	The Top 42	"龙的传人"
Episode 9 (12 September)	4	Xing Hanming 邢晗铭	"疯子"
Episode 9 (12 September)	5	Li Fanyi 李凡一	"踮起脚尖爱"
Episode 9 (12 September)	6	Liu Minxuan 刘珉轩	"肆意的河"
Episode 9 (12 September)	7	Ronghao Li	"贫穷或富有"
Episode 9 (12 September)	8	Zhang Peng 张鹏	"大江东去"
Episode 9 (12 September)	9	Harlem Yu	"在一起"
Episode 9 (12 September)	10	Sidanmanchu 斯丹曼簇	"忘我"
Episode 9 (12 September)	11	Na Ying	"出现"
Episode 9 (12 September)	12	Na Ying	"珊瑚颂"
Episode 9 (12 September)	13	CPU	"玫瑰玫瑰我爱你"
Episode 9 (12 September)	14	Jasmyn Aisin Gioro 爱新觉罗媚	"中国姑娘"
Episode 9 (12 September)	15	Wang Leehom	"缘份一道桥"
Episode 9 (12 September)	16	Harry Hong 洪雨雷 (with 熊域进, 王世澍 & 彭冠滔)	"流星雨"
Episode 9 (12 September)	17	Wang Leehom	"心中的日月"
Episode 9 (12 September)	18	Deer Chen	"妄想的月光"

=== The National Day Special (4 October) ===
The fourteenth episode was a two-hour special episode aired on 4 October, featuring performances by the coaches and artists in celebration of the National Day of the People's Republic of China. The episode was taped on 28 September 2019, at the Cotai Arena.

Episode	Order	Performer(s)	Song
Episode 9 (12 September)	1	The Top 11 (plus Luo Lei 骆蕾, Jia Zheng 贾铮 & Zhang Tianyu 张天予, minus Cui Jiaying 崔佳莹 & Liu Meilin 刘美麟)	"我爱你中国"
Episode 9 (12 September)	2	Li Ronghao (with Xing Hanming 邢晗铭 & Li Fanyi 李凡一)	"黄种人"
Episode 9 (12 September)	3	Li Fanyi 李凡一	"亲爱的那不是爱情"
Episode 9 (12 September)	4	Luo Lei 骆蕾	"小半"
Episode 9 (12 September)	5	Ronghao Li	"作曲家"
Episode 9 (12 September)	6	Harlem Yu & his team (Chen Qinan 陈其楠, Wang Shuai 汪帅 & Luo Lei 骆蕾)	"爱转动"
Episode 9 (12 September)	7	Wang Shuai 汪帅	"走西口"
Episode 9 (12 September)	8	Jia Zheng 贾铮	"就是现在"
Episode 9 (12 September)	9	Harlem Yu	"静静的"
Episode 9 (12 September)	10	Xiao Qiang 肖蔷	"无问西东"
Episode 9 (12 September)	11	Nasi Li 李芷婷	"你敢不敢"
Episode 9 (12 September)	12	Zhang Tianyu 张天予	"自己"
Episode 9 (12 September)	13	Jasmyn Aisin Gioro 爱新觉罗媚	"长腿叔叔"
Episode 9 (12 September)	14	Na Ying	"只有为你"
Episode 9 (12 September)	15	Na Ying	"不将就"
Episode 9 (12 September)	16	Na Ying	"最长的电影"
Episode 9 (12 September)	17	Na Ying	"勇敢的心"

== Reception ==
=== CSM52 ratings ===
Episode		Original airdate	Production	Time slot (UTC+8)	Rating	Share	Ranking	Source
1	"The Blind Auditions Premiere"	19 July 2019	401	Friday 9:10 p.m.	2.271	11.22	1	
2	"The Blind Auditions, Part 2"	26 July 2019	402	Friday 9:10 p.m.	2.416	10.93	1	
3	"The Blind Auditions, Part 3"	2 August 2019	403	Friday 9:10 p.m.	2.032	9.4	1	
4	"The Blind Auditions, Part 4"	9 August 2019	404	Friday 9:10 p.m.	2.098	10.53	1	
5	"The Blind Auditions, Part 5"	16 August 2019	405	Friday 9:10 p.m.	1.676	8.7	1	
6	"The Cross Battles Premiere"	23 August 2019	406	Friday 9:10 p.m.	1.912	9.83	1	
7	"The Cross Battles, Part 2"	30 August 2019	407	Friday 9:10 p.m.	1.826	9.24	1	
8	"The Cross Battles, Part 3"	6 September 2019	408	Friday 9:10 p.m.	1.775	8.71	1	
9	"The Mid-Autumn Special"	12 September 2019	409	Thursday 9:10 p.m.	0.714	3.73	4	
10	"The Cross Knockouts Premiere"	13 September 2019	410	Friday 9:10 p.m.	1.808	8.04	1	
11	"The Cross Knockouts, Part 2"	20 September 2019	411	Friday 9:10 p.m.	2.008	10.2	1	
12	"The Playoffs Premiere"	27 September 2019	412	Friday 9:10 p.m.	1.417	8.07	1	
13	"The Playoffs, Part 2"	30 September 2019	413	Monday 9:10 p.m	1.555	9.99	1	
14	"The National Day Special"	4 October 2019	414	Friday 9:10 p.m.	1.555	9.99	1	
15	"The Finals"	7 October 2019	415	Monday 9:10 p.m				
