= JC (singer) =

- Pronunciation: Chan4 Wing6 Tung4
- Born: Jennifer Chan 陳詠彤; 23 June 1998 (age 27); Hong Kong
- Education: Hong Kong Polytechnic University
- Alma mater: St. Francis' Canossian College
- Occupation: Singer
- Years active: 2016–present
- Height: 168 cm (5 ft 6 in)
- Musical career
- Genres: Cantopop; Mandopop
- Instrument: Vocals, piano
- Label: Amusic
- Website: JC on Facebook; JC on Weibo

Jennifer Chan (simplified Chinese: 陈咏彤; traditional Chinese: 陳詠彤; pinyin: Chén Yǒngtóng; born 23 June 1998) is a Hong Kong female singer debuted in 2016 under Amusic, professionally known as JC.

== Career ==
She had participated in different singing competitions since the age of 15 and was signed to Amusic in 2016. Her debut single "說散就散 It's Been Apart" was the Top 10 Trending YouTube Videos of 2016 in Hong Kong. In 2016, she performed her debut single on Leon Lai's concert. She was invited to perform "Chengdu" and "It's Been Apart" on HunanTV New Year Concert with Bai Jingting, Bibi Zhou and Yoyo Sham.

On 10 August 2018, she appeared in Sing! China.

== Discography ==
=== Singles ===
Single	Released date	Note
說散就散It's Been Apart	20 June 2016	Mandarin;2016 Top 10 Trending YouTube Videos of 2016 in Hong Kong. Theme song of Singaporean TV Drama Doppelganger
好心分手 Please Breakup	9 September 2016	Cover of Candy Lo
別說 Don't Say	18 October 2016	Mandarin; Same melody with Time is Right by Yisa Yu
現任朋友 Current Friend	28 June 2017	Mandarin
別𠱁我 Don't Sweet Talk Me	23 July 2018	Cantonese

==== Chart Performance of singles ====
Chart Performance
Album	Title	China	Taiwan	Malaysia	HK	Note
2016
	It's Been Apart	3	8	1	1	
	Please Break Up	–	–	–	9	
	Don't Say	–	–	–	2	
2017
	Current Friend	–	-	–	15	TVB8: 1
