= The Dark Plum Sauce =

Single by Li Ronghao

from the album Free Soul
- Language: Chinese
- Released: November 24, 2022
- Genre: Mandopop
- Length: 4:18
- Label: Young Music
- Songwriter: Li Ronghao
- Producer: Li Ronghao

Li Ronghao singles chronology
"And the Winner Is" (2022)	"The Dark Plum Sauce" (2022)	"Perhaps Love" (2022)

Music video
- "The Dark Plum Sauce" on YouTube

"The Dark Plum Sauce" (乌梅子酱) is a song recorded by Chinese singer Li Ronghao. The song was released on November 24, 2022.

== Commercial performance ==
The song went viral in 2023 on the Chinese social media app Douyin, the song amassed over three billion views. The song also won the Spotify's Top Global Mandopop Song of the Year.

== Personnel ==
All credits are adapted from Apple Music.

Musicians

- Li Ronghao – Vocals, Guitar, Background Vocals and Bass
- Li Yan Chao – Drums

Technical

- Li Ronghao – Arranger, Composer, Lyrics, Producer, Recording Engineer and Mixing Engineer
- Zhou Tianche – Mastering Engineer

== Release history ==
Release history and formats for "The Dark Plum Sauce"
Region	Date	Format	Label	Ref.
Various	November 24, 2022	Digital download; streaming	Young Music	
