= Sing! China season 3 =

Sing! China
- Season 3
- Hosted by: Hu Qiaohua (episode 1–10, 12–14); Rosy Luo (episode 11)
- Coaches: Jay Chou; Harlem Yu; Li Jian; Nicholas Tse
- Winner: Tenzin Nyima 旦增尼玛
- Winning coach: Li Jian
- Runner-up: Li Zhenwu 黎真吾
- Finals venue: Beijing National Stadium

Release
- Original network: Zhejiang Television
- Original release: 13 July – 7 October 2018

Season chronology
- ← Previous; Season 2 Next → Season 4

The third season of the Chinese reality talent show Sing! China premiered on 13 July 2018, on Zhejiang Television. Jay Chou is the only coach to return from the previous season. Returning coach Harlem Yu and new coaches Li Jian and Nicholas Tse replaced Eason Chan, Liu Huan and Na Ying in this season.

This is the first season which resumed the usage of the Chinese show name "中国好声音", following the withdrawal of a legal dispute between Star China Media and its former partner Talpa Media in 2016 which barred the former from using the name that was previously seen on The Voice of China, a show which the latter owns the franchise. Despite reverting to its original Chinese name, the show would not be produced as part of The Voice franchise. It would retain its English name and continue to run in its original Sing! China competition format.

On 7 October, Tenzin Nyima 旦增尼玛 of Team Li Jian was announced as the winner of the season, with Li Zhenwu 黎真吾 of Team Harlem as runner-up. Liu Junge 刘郡格 of Team Nicholas finished in third place, while Team Jay's Su Han 宿涵 and Cering 周兴才让 finished in fourth and fifth place respectively.

== Coaches and hosts ==
Sing! China season 3 coaches

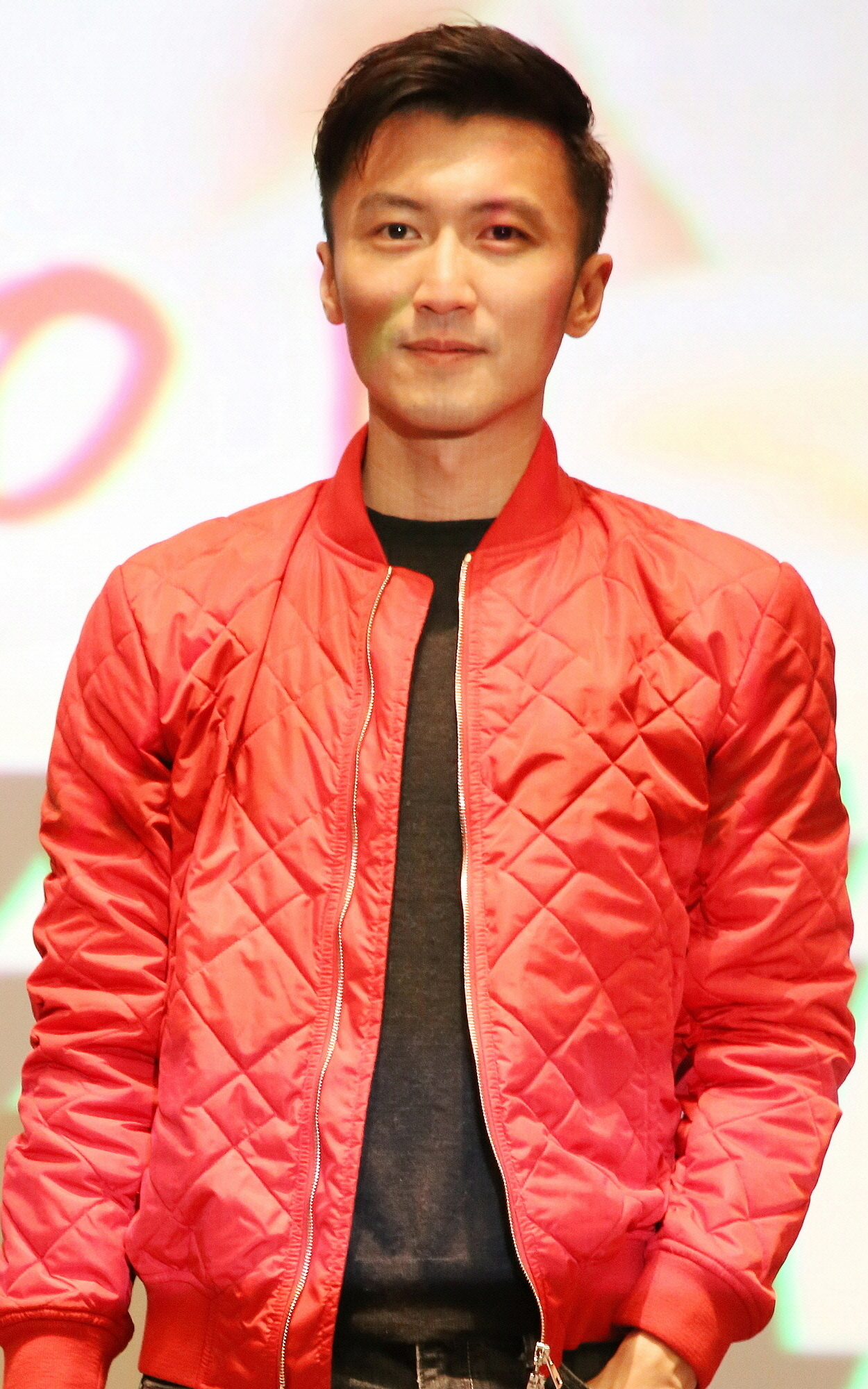
Nicholas Tse

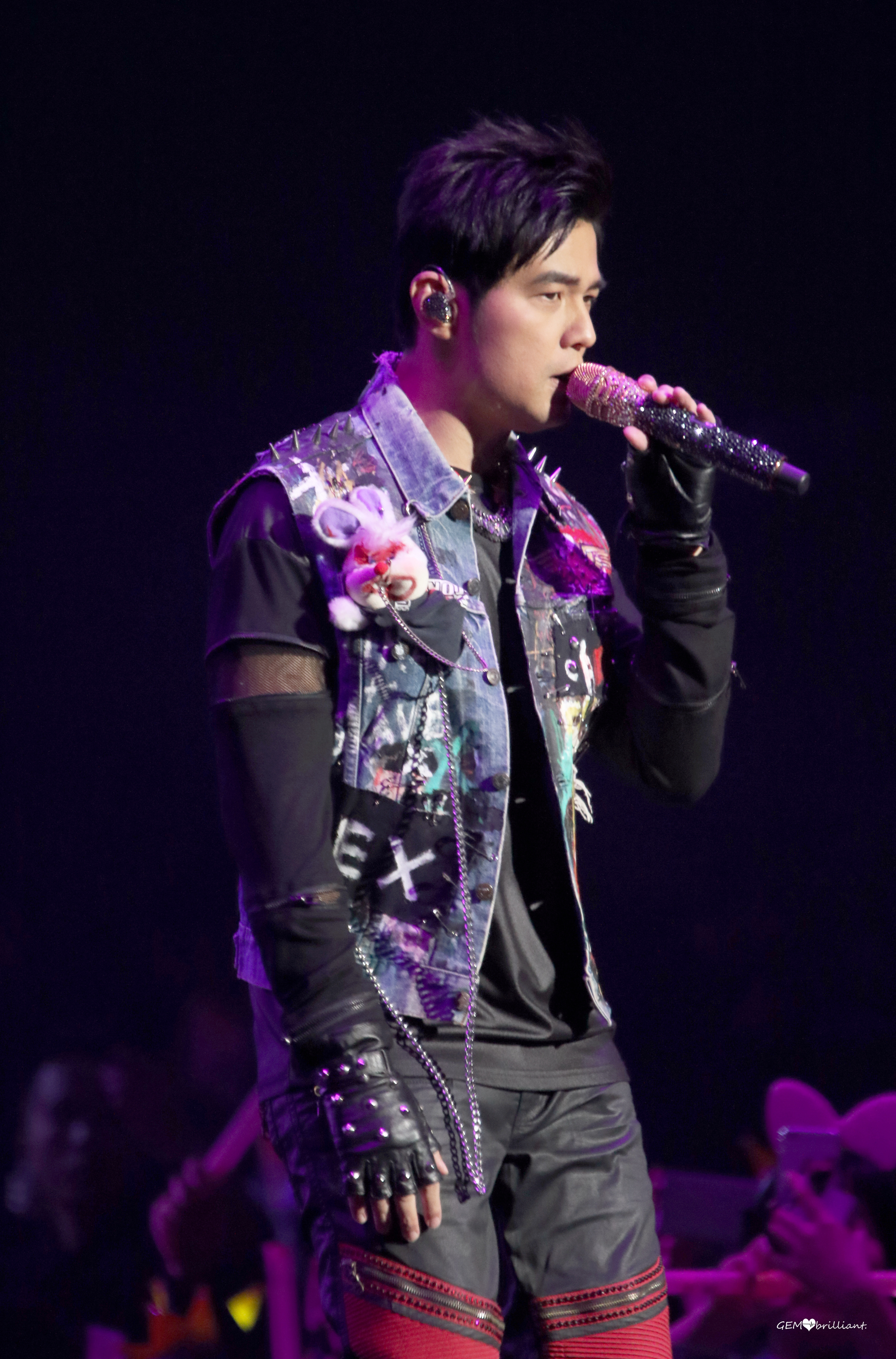
Jay Chou

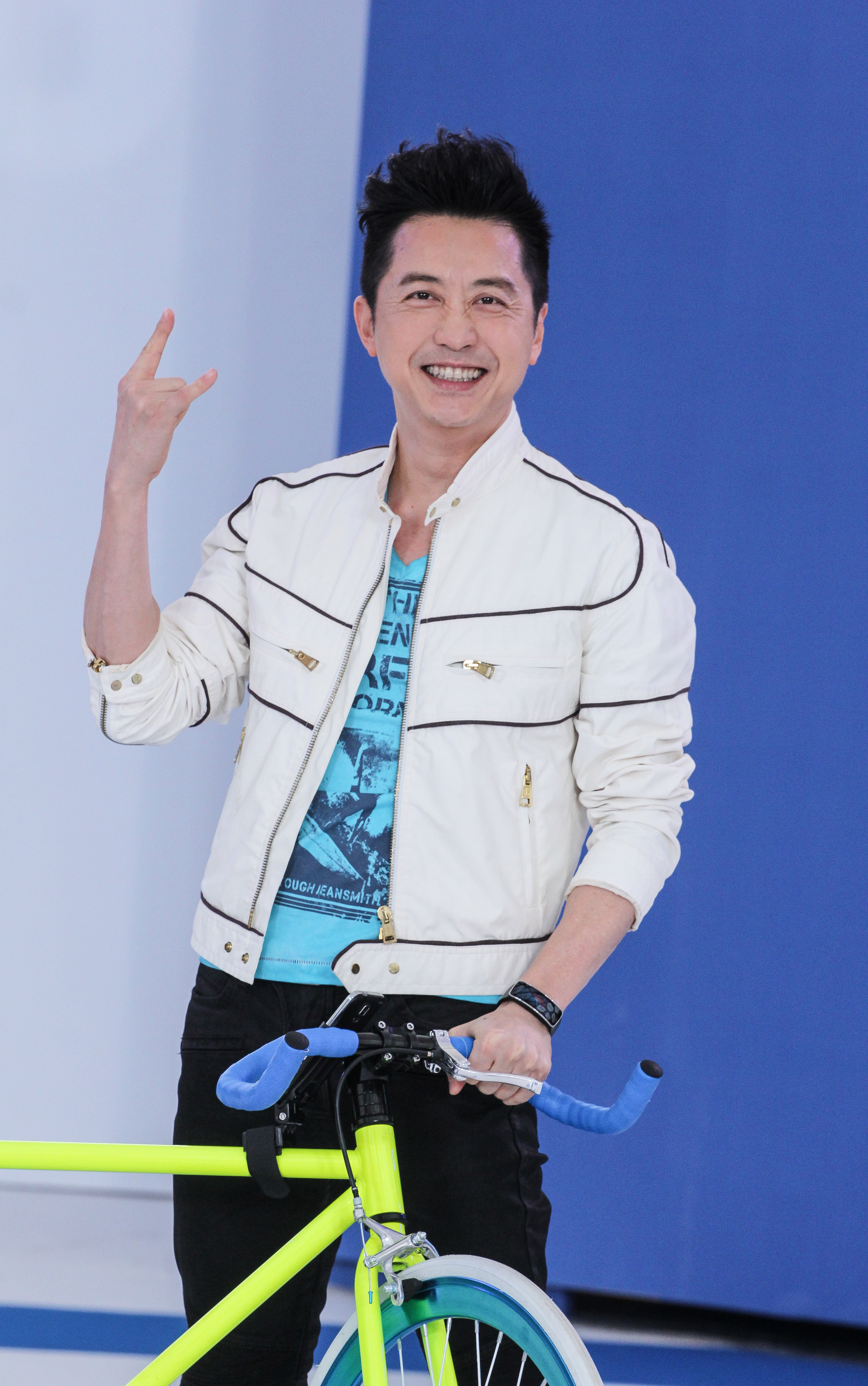
Harlem Yu

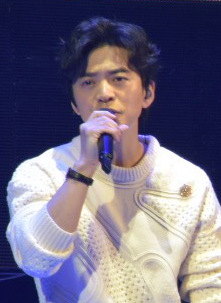
Li Jian

On 11 October 2017, three days after previous season's grand finals, Na Ying announced via her management that she has decided to leave the show and would not be returning for her third season as a coach. Her move also ended her six-year consecutive stint as a coach, which began since the first season of The Voice of China. Individuals rumoured to be replacing Na included Faye Wong, Tsai Chin and Su Rui. In an official statement, Chou's management said the rumour is "fake" as the team had yet to decide on Chou's involvement in the third season as the latter was "busy touring" and it was still premature to discuss a show that would only take place a year later. Lu Wei, the show's publicity director, said Chou would be invited to return as a coach, and refuted the claim that he has signed a three-year contract with the show as the show's production team renews contracts with the coaches every year. On 3 November, Chou was confirmed to be returning for his third season. On 28 March 2018, it was announced that Li Jian and Nicholas Tse would also be joining the show as new coaches, with a fourth coach that was yet to be announced. On 4 May, it was reported by the Taiwanese media that former coach Harlem Yu, who left the show after the first season, would be returning to the show as the unannounced fourth coach. Yu's involvement in the show was neither confirmed by his management nor the show's production team till 29 May, when it was officially announced via the show's social media that Yu would be the fourth and final coach to join the show. Eason Chan and last season's winning coach Liu Huan were therefore confirmed to have left the show.

This is the first season in the show's history not to feature a female coach, and also the first to have more than two coaches not originating from mainland China.

Hu Qiaohua returned for his second season as the main host. The eleventh episode was hosted by Rosy Luo.

== Teams ==
Colour key

- Winner
- Runner-up
- Third place
- Fourth place
- Fifth place
- Eliminated in the Playoffs
- Eliminated in the Cross Knockout rounds
- Eliminated in the Cross Battle rounds
- Eliminated in the Battle rounds
- Eliminated in the Blind Auditions
- Withdrew

Coaches	Top 44 artists			
Nicholas Tse				
Nicholas Tse	Liu Junge 刘郡格	Double Angel 打包安琪	Deng Zixiao 邓紫霄	Vash Hsu 徐暐翔
Nicholas Tse	Wang Chao 王朝	Li Jiadan 李佳丹	Hao Yaqing 郝亚青	Jun Chan 陈俊皓
Nicholas Tse	Liao Yingxuan 廖颖轩	Su Yuhan 宿雨涵	Xing Kaixiang 邢凯翔	Xu Shihan 徐诗寒
Jay Chou				
Jay Chou	Su Han 宿涵	Cering 周兴才让	Zhang Shen'er 张神儿	Evis Wy
Jay Chou	Golden Eggplosives 金色炸蛋	Bryce Wu 吴奇	Eli Low 刘嘉慧	Nix 陈佳杏
Jay Chou	Wang Naiying 王乃迎	Zhang Chaoyang 张超洋	Annabella Chua 蔡咏琪	
Harlem Yu				
Harlem Yu	Li Zhenwu 黎真吾	Nigel Tay 郑伟杰	Huang Renqin 黄稔钦	Suzanne Low 刘思延
Harlem Yu	Ericson Bi 毕晓鑫	June Wong 黄玉儿	Blue Wang 王曼玉	JC 陈泳彤
Harlem Yu	Kenny Chan 陈旭侃	Peng Anni 彭安妮		
Li Jian				
Li Jian	Tenzin Nyima 旦增尼玛	Kang Shulong 康树龙	Tiger 谭秋娟	Gary Zhao 赵家豪
Li Jian	Li Zhiyu 李志宇	Wang Xuan 王轩	Beverly Lim Morata 村田白慧莉	Chen Guanyu 陈冠宇
Li Jian	Gao Jinli 高巾立	Liao Yetian 廖野天	Wang Kai 王恺	

== Blind auditions ==
The taping of the blind auditions began on 20 June and ended on 6 July. This season saw the return of the rotating coaches' chairs that are similar to the ones featured in The Voice which the show is rebranded from. The coaches would listen to the contestants on stage in those chairs which are faced away from the stage. If they like what they hear from a contestant, they press the button on their chairs which rotates them to face the stage. This signifies that the contestant has been recruited to join the respective coach's team. If more than one coach presses their button, the contestant would then choose the coach they want to work with. If none of the coaches presses their button, the losing artist would leave the stage straight away, without any conversations with the coaches, and the chairs would remain unturned.

In the blind auditions, the coaches are to recruit a total of six artists to form a team of their own. The forming of the teams this season would move to a format that is similar to the "Six-Chair Challenge" featured in the British version of The X Factor. Once a team is full with six artists occupying all the spots, the subsequent artists which the coach has successfully recruited would have to face-off with one of the six artists in the sing-offs for a spot in the team. The incoming artist may select any of the six defending artists to compete against in the sing-off, and both artists would each sing a new song and the coach would decide on the winner. The winner would be given the spot in the team while the other would be eliminated. For defending artists, once they have won a sing-off against an incoming artist, they would receive immunity from the subsequent sing-offs and immediately advance to the next round of the competition.

In this season, the performance order during the blind auditions would be decided on the spot by the coaches. The coaches would be given a list of songs which the artists would be performing, and the coaches would take turn to pick the songs which they would like to hear first, and the respective artist would be called upon the stage to perform the song. Therefore, the artists would only be notified of their performance order minutes before their performances. Before the artists perform, they would each select a coach which they would like to work with the most, and the coach's head shot would be shown in real-time on the large screen attached to their respective chairs during their performance. This allows the artists to see how their preferred coaches are reacting to their performances while the latter is facing away from the stage, thus potentially influencing the artist's final choice of coach.

The second episode, which was originally slated to air on 20 July, failed to air as planned due to "post-production complications and scheduling conflicts".

Colour key

	Coach picked this artist to perform (via artist's song choice)
	Artist selected this coach as his or her preferred coach before performance
✔	Coach pressed his button
	Artist defaulted to this coach's team
	Artist elected to join this coach's team
	Artist eliminated with no coach pressing his button
	Artist withdrew from the competition
	Artist remained on the team after winning sing-off; immune from subsequent sing-offs
	Artist remained on the team after winning sing-off; replaced a defending artist
	Artist eliminated by coach after losing sing-off

=== Episode 1 (13 July) ===
The four coaches performed a medley of each other's songs – Nicholas Tse and Harlem Yu performed their personal hits "让我一次爱个够" and "因为爱所以爱", Jay Chou performed Li Jian's "抚仙湖", Li performed Chou's "等你下课" – and concluded the performances with "霍元甲" and "万里长城永不倒".

Order	Artist	Age	Hometown	Song	Coach's and artist's choices				Lost sing-off to
Order	Artist	Age	Hometown	Song	Nicholas	Jay	Harlem	Li Jian	Lost sing-off to
1	Annabella Chua 蔡咏琪^{1}	17	Kota Tinggi, Johor, Malaysia	"Love U U"	—	✔	✔	✔	Withdrew
2	Li Zhenwu 黎真吾	23	Yibin, Sichuan	"山海"	✔	✔	✔	✔	Not selected
3	Kang Shulong 康树龙	31	Harbin, Heilongjiang	"魔鬼中的天使"	✔	—	—	✔	Immune
4	Tiger 谭秋娟	20	Chongqing	"Loving Strangers"	✔	—	✔	✔	Not selected
5	Double Angel 打包安琪 (Huang Anqi 黄安琪 & Liu Anqi 刘安琪)	23 / 26	Wuhan, Hubei / Xiangtan, Hunan	"权御天下"	✔	^{2} ✔	✔	^{2} ✔	Not selected
6	Su Yuhan 宿雨涵	20	Shijiazhuang, Hebei	"等下一个他"	✔	—	—	—	Deng Zixiao 邓紫霄
7	Vash Hsu 徐暐翔	26	Taichung, Taiwan	"情歌"	✔	—	—	—	Immune
8	Jun Chan 陈俊皓	23	Sha Tin, Hong Kong	"半点心"	✔	—	—	—	Xu Shihan 徐诗寒
9	Xing Kaixiang 邢凯翔	30	Chaoyang District, Beijing	"潜龙勿用"	✔	—	—	—	Liao Yingxuan 廖颖轩
10	Wang Chao 王朝	26	Yuci, Shanxi	"黄河谣"	✔	—	✔	✔	Not selected

1. Annabella Chua 蔡咏琪 was originally featured in the first episode and was prominently known as the first artist to join Team Jay. However, she is believed to have been removed from the show as her age (17 years) has violated the new rules set out by the State Administration of Radio and Television which ban individuals below 18 years old from participating local television talent shows. Her audition was completely edited out in the rerun of the first episode, and clips of her involvement in the competition were also subsequently removed from video-sharing websites. She was neither mentioned nor shown in the later episodes as an artist of Team Jay, thus effectively confirmed her withdrawal from the competition.
2. Huang Anqi 黄安琪 chose Li Jian as her preferred coach, while Liu Anqi 刘安琪 chose Jay Chou.

=== Episode 2 (27 July) ===
Order	Artist	Age	Hometown	Song	Coach's and artist's choices				Lost sing-off to
Order	Artist	Age	Hometown	Song	Nicholas	Jay	Harlem	Li Jian	Lost sing-off to
1	Beverly Lim Morata 村田白慧莉	39	Singapore	"雪の華" / "飘雪"	—	—	—	✔	Li Zhiyu 李志宇
2	Kenny Chan 陈旭侃	25	Jingzhou, Hubei	"十二楼"	—	—	✔	—	Peng Anni 彭安妮
3	Jess Wy 雷婉妍	29	Malaysia	"等你下课"	—	—	—	—	—
4	Zhang Chaoyang 张超洋	28	Xi'an, Shaanxi	"遇见"	—	✔	—	✔	Cering 周兴才让
5	Liao Yingxuan 廖颖轩	26	Guangzhou, Guangdong	"我真的需要"	✔	—	—	—	Li Jiadan 李佳丹
6	Li Jiadan 李佳丹	27	Shenyang, Liaoning	"英雄"	✔	✔	✔	✔	Not selected
7	Tenzin Nyima 旦增尼玛	26	Huangnan Tibetan Autonomous Prefecture, Qinghai	"隐形纪念"	—	✔	✔	✔	Immune
8	Deng Zixiao 邓紫霄	20	Chengdu, Sichuan	"因为爱所以爱"	✔	—	—	—	Not selected
9	Gao Jinli 高巾立	26	Mudanjiang, Heilongjiang	"的青春"	—	✔	—	✔	Wang Xuan 王轩
10	Gary Zhao 赵家豪	21	Shenzhen, Guangdong	"慢慢喜欢你"	✔	—	—	✔	Immune
11	Liao Yetian 廖野天	28	Qingdao, Shandong	"空心"	✔	—	—	✔	Gary Zhao 赵家豪

=== Episode 3 (3 August) ===
Order	Artist	Age	Hometown	Song	Coach's and artist's choices				Lost sing-off to
Order	Artist	Age	Hometown	Song	Nicholas	Jay	Harlem	Li Jian	Lost sing-off to
1	Nix 陈佳杏	24	New York, United States	"听妈妈的话"	—	✔	—	—	Su Han 宿涵
2	Wang Naiying 王乃迎	25	Nanping, Fujian	"不爱我就拉倒"	—	✔	—	—	Eli Low 刘嘉慧
3	Evis Wy	33	Philadelphia, United States	"爱在西元前"	—	✔	✔	—	Not selected
4	Golden Eggplosives 金色炸蛋 (Kinny Jin 金玲莉 & Meng Weixuan 孟维轩)	21 / 23	Anshun, Guizhou / Jilin, Jilin	"忍者" / "黄金甲" / "将军" / "止战之殇"	—	✔	—	—	Not selected
5	Zhang Shen'er 张神儿	23	Wuhan, Hubei	"母系社会"	✔	✔	✔	✔	Not selected
6	Eli Low 刘嘉慧	24	Singapore	"时间轴"	✔	✔	✔	✔	Bryce Wu 吴奇
7	Su Han 宿涵	24	Shenyang, Liaoning	"止战之殇" / "Rap God"	✔	✔	✔	✔	Not selected
8	Nigel Tay 郑伟杰	28	Malaysia / United States	"催眠"	—	—	✔	✔	Not selected
9	Bryce Wu 吴奇	23	Chengdu, Sichuan	"体面"	✔	✔	—	—	Not selected

=== Episode 4 (10 August) ===
Order	Artist	Age	Hometown	Song	Coach's and artist's choices				Lost sing-off to
Order	Artist	Age	Hometown	Song	Nicholas	Jay	Harlem	Li Jian	Lost sing-off to
1	Ericson Bi 毕晓鑫	24	Shenyang, Liaoning	"Loving You"	—	—	✔	—	Not selected
2	Suzanne Low 刘思延	21	Penang, Malaysia	"天天"	—	✔	✔	—	Not selected
3	Blue Wang 王曼玉	25	Beijing	"花火"	—	—	✔	✔	Huang Renqin 黄稔钦
4	Li Zhiyu 李志宇	34	Shijiazhuang, Hebei	"侠客行"	—	✔	—	✔	Not selected
5	Cering 周兴才让	23	Hainan Tibetan Autonomous Prefecture, Qinghai	"大雁"	—	✔	—	✔	Not selected
6	Peter Chen 陈彼得	74	Taipei, Taiwan	"Remember Me"	—	—	—	—	—
7	Wang Kai 王恺	35	Xi'an, Shaanxi	"What'd I Say"	—	✔	—	✔	Kang Shulong 康树龙
8	Huang Renqin 黄稔钦	24	Kunming, Yunnan	"Shape of You"	—	—	✔	✔	Immune
9	JC 陈泳彤	20	Hong Kong	"说散就散"	—	—	✔	✔	Huang Renqin 黄稔钦

=== Episode 5 (17 August) ===
Order	Artist	Age	Hometown	Song	Coach's and artist's choices				Lost sing-off to
Order	Artist	Age	Hometown	Song	Nicholas	Jay	Harlem	Li Jian	Lost sing-off to
1	Xu Shihan 徐诗寒	22	Xi'an, Shaanxi	"风流女生"	✔	—	—	—	Liu Junge 刘郡格
2	Peng Anni 彭安妮	34	Wuhan, Hubei	"你安静起来"	—	✔	✔	✔	June Wong 黄玉儿
3	June Wong 黄玉儿	31	Malaysia	"Love Song"	—	—	✔	—	Not selected
4	Tsakhiagiin 道尔吉	29	Haixi Mongol and Tibetan Autonomous Prefecture, Qinghai	"海然海然"	—	—	—	—	—
5	Hao Yaqing 郝亚青	28	Jinzhong, Shanxi	"你想干什么"	✔	—	✔	✔	Vash Hsu 徐暐翔
6	Chen Guanyu 陈冠宇	20	Xiangcheng City, Henan	"Let You Go"	—	✔	✔	✔	Tenzin Nyima 旦增尼玛
7	Wang Xuan 王轩	31	Beijing	"差一步"	—	—	—	✔	Not selected
8	Liu Junge 刘郡格	28	Beijing	"No Fear in My Heart"	✔	—	—	✔	Not selected

=== Sing-off details ===
Episode	Order	Song	Incoming artist	Defending artist	Song	Final 6 replacement chart					
Episode	Order	Song	Incoming artist	Defending artist	Song	1	2	3	4	5	6
Team Nicholas
First six defending artists						Double Angel 打包安琪	Su Yuhan 宿雨涵	Vash Hsu 徐暐翔	Jun Chan 陈俊皓	Xing Kaixiang 邢凯翔	Wang Chao 王朝
2	1	"达尼亚"	Liao Yingxuan 廖颖轩	Xing Kaixiang 邢凯翔	"红尘来去一场梦"	Double Angel 打包安琪	Su Yuhan 宿雨涵	Vash Hsu 徐暐翔	Jun Chan 陈俊皓	Liao Yingxuan 廖颖轩	Wang Chao 王朝
2	2	"你的背包"	Li Jiadan 李佳丹	Liao Yingxuan 廖颖轩	"有些事我们永远无法左右"	Double Angel 打包安琪	Su Yuhan 宿雨涵	Vash Hsu 徐暐翔	Jun Chan 陈俊皓	Li Jiadan 李佳丹	Wang Chao 王朝
2	3	"Flashlight"	Deng Zixiao 邓紫霄	Su Yuhan 宿雨涵	"Diamonds"	Double Angel 打包安琪	Deng Zixiao 邓紫霄	Vash Hsu 徐暐翔	Jun Chan 陈俊皓	Li Jiadan 李佳丹	Wang Chao 王朝
5	4	"看见什么吃什么"	Xu Shihan 徐诗寒	Jun Chan 陈俊皓	"有了你"	Double Angel 打包安琪	Deng Zixiao 邓紫霄	Vash Hsu 徐暐翔	Xu Shihan 徐诗寒	Li Jiadan 李佳丹	Wang Chao 王朝
5	5	"离不开你"	Hao Yaqing 郝亚青	Vash Hsu 徐暐翔	"他在那里"	Double Angel 打包安琪	Deng Zixiao 邓紫霄	Vash Hsu 徐暐翔	Xu Shihan 徐诗寒	Li Jiadan 李佳丹	Wang Chao 王朝
5	6	"男孩"	Liu Junge 刘郡格	Xu Shihan 徐诗寒	"只爱高跟鞋"	Double Angel 打包安琪	Deng Zixiao 邓紫霄	Vash Hsu 徐暐翔	Liu Junge 刘郡格	Li Jiadan 李佳丹	Wang Chao 王朝
Team Jay
First six defending artists						Zhang Chaoyang 张超洋	Nix 陈佳杏	Wang Naiying 王乃迎	Evis Wy	Golden Eggplosives 金色炸蛋	Zhang Shen'er 张神儿
3	1	"拥有"	Eli Low 刘嘉慧	Wang Naiying 王乃迎	"一朵花"	Zhang Chaoyang 张超洋	Nix 陈佳杏	Eli Low 刘嘉慧	Evis Wy	Golden Eggplosives 金色炸蛋	Zhang Shen'er 张神儿
3	2	"半岛铁盒" / "雨下一整晚"	Su Han 宿涵	Nix 陈佳杏	"Price Tag" / "不潮不用花钱"	Zhang Chaoyang 张超洋	Su Han 宿涵	Eli Low 刘嘉慧	Evis Wy	Golden Eggplosives 金色炸蛋	Zhang Shen'er 张神儿
3	3	"不爱"	Bryce Wu 吴奇	Eli Low 刘嘉慧	"我们的总和"	Zhang Chaoyang 张超洋	Su Han 宿涵	Bryce Wu 吴奇	Evis Wy	Golden Eggplosives 金色炸蛋	Zhang Shen'er 张神儿
4	4	"晨曦"	Cering 周兴才让	Zhang Chaoyang 张超洋	"兰亭序"	Cering 周兴才让	Su Han 宿涵	Bryce Wu 吴奇	Evis Wy	Golden Eggplosives 金色炸蛋	Zhang Shen'er 张神儿
Team Harlem
First six defending artists						Li Zhenwu 黎真吾	Kenny Chan 陈旭侃	Nigel Tay 郑伟杰	Ericson Bi 毕晓鑫	Suzanne Low 刘思延	Blue Wang 王曼玉
4	1	"青春好无聊"	Huang Renqin 黄稔钦	Blue Wang 王曼玉	"易燃易爆炸"	Li Zhenwu 黎真吾	Kenny Chan 陈旭侃	Nigel Tay 郑伟杰	Ericson Bi 毕晓鑫	Suzanne Low 刘思延	Huang Renqin 黄稔钦
5	2	"Mercy on Me"	JC 陈泳彤	Huang Renqin 黄稔钦	"Billie Jean"	Li Zhenwu 黎真吾	Kenny Chan 陈旭侃	Nigel Tay 郑伟杰	Ericson Bi 毕晓鑫	Suzanne Low 刘思延	Huang Renqin 黄稔钦
5	3	"诱"	Peng Anni 彭安妮	Kenny Chan 陈旭侃	"走马"	Li Zhenwu 黎真吾	Peng Anni 彭安妮	Nigel Tay 郑伟杰	Ericson Bi 毕晓鑫	Suzanne Low 刘思延	Huang Renqin 黄稔钦
5	4	"卑鄙"	June Wong 黄玉儿	Peng Anni 彭安妮	"如你一般的人"	Li Zhenwu 黎真吾	June Wong 黄玉儿	Nigel Tay 郑伟杰	Ericson Bi 毕晓鑫	Suzanne Low 刘思延	Huang Renqin 黄稔钦
Team Li Jian
First six defending artists						Kang Shulong 康树龙	Tiger 谭秋娟	Beverly Lim Morata 村田白慧莉	Tenzin Nyima 旦增尼玛	Gao Jinli 高巾立	Gary Zhao 赵家豪
2	1	"Lydia"	Liao Yetian 廖野天	Gary Zhao 赵家豪	"Man in the Mirror"	Kang Shulong 康树龙	Tiger 谭秋娟	Beverly Lim Morata 村田白慧莉	Tenzin Nyima 旦增尼玛	Gao Jinli 高巾立	Gary Zhao 赵家豪
4	2	"赌局"	Li Zhiyu 李志宇	Beverly Lim Morata 村田白慧莉	"Sorry"	Kang Shulong 康树龙	Tiger 谭秋娟	Li Zhiyu 李志宇	Tenzin Nyima 旦增尼玛	Gao Jinli 高巾立	Gary Zhao 赵家豪
4	3	"相对"	Wang Kai 王恺	Kang Shulong 康树龙	"8+8=8"	Kang Shulong 康树龙	Tiger 谭秋娟	Li Zhiyu 李志宇	Tenzin Nyima 旦增尼玛	Gao Jinli 高巾立	Gary Zhao 赵家豪
5	4	"你还怕大雨吗"	Chen Guanyu 陈冠宇	Tenzin Nyima 旦增尼玛	"一剪梅"	Kang Shulong 康树龙	Tiger 谭秋娟	Li Zhiyu 李志宇	Tenzin Nyima 旦增尼玛	Gao Jinli 高巾立	Gary Zhao 赵家豪
5	5	"为你我受冷风吹"	Wang Xuan 王轩	Gao Jinli 高巾立	"南方以南"	Kang Shulong 康树龙	Tiger 谭秋娟	Li Zhiyu 李志宇	Tenzin Nyima 旦增尼玛	Wang Xuan 王轩	Gary Zhao 赵家豪

== The Battles ==
The Battle rounds began airing on 24 August and ended on the following week on 31 August. The first episode featured Battles from Team Nicholas and Team Li Jian, while the second would feature performances from Team Harlem and Team Jay.

For the first time in show's history, the show included the Battle rounds in the course of the competition which pairs two artists together for a duet. The winners of the Battles, as decided by the coaches, would advance to the Cross Battles. At the end of the Battles, the coaches would each select two losing artists from their team to perform in the coach's save round. The winners of the coach's save rounds would then advance to the Cross Battles as part of their team's final four.

Colour key

Artist won the Battle and advanced to the Cross Battles
Artist lost the Battle but was chosen by their coach to perform in the coach's save round
Artist won the coach's save round and advanced to the Cross Battles
Artist lost the Battle or coach's save round and was eliminated

Episode	Coach	Order	Winner	Song		Loser
Episode 6 (24 August)						
Episode 6 (24 August)	Nicholas Tse	1	Deng Zixiao 邓紫霄	"光年之外" / "潜龙勿用"		Vash Hsu 徐暐翔
Episode 6 (24 August)	Nicholas Tse	2	Liu Junge 刘郡格	"煎熬"		Wang Chao 王朝
Episode 6 (24 August)	Nicholas Tse	3	Double Angel 打包安琪	"情非得已"		Li Jiadan 李佳丹
Episode 6 (24 August)	Nicholas Tse	Coach's save performances				
Episode 6 (24 August)	Nicholas Tse	4	Vash Hsu 徐暐翔	"余波荡漾"	"我很好"	Wang Chao 王朝
Episode 6 (24 August)	Li Jian	5	Gary Zhao 赵家豪	"水中花" / "La Vie en rose"		Tiger 谭秋娟
Episode 6 (24 August)	Li Jian	6	Kang Shulong 康树龙	"野花"		Tenzin Nyima 旦增尼玛
Episode 6 (24 August)	Li Jian	7	N/A^{1}	"往日时光" / "三套车"		Li Zhiyu 李志宇
Episode 6 (24 August)	Li Jian	7	N/A^{1}	"往日时光" / "三套车"		Wang Xuan 王轩
Episode 6 (24 August)	Li Jian	Coach's save performances				
Episode 6 (24 August)	Li Jian	8	Tiger 谭秋娟	"500 Miles"	"灯塔"	Li Zhiyu 李志宇
Episode 6 (24 August)	Li Jian	8	Tenzin Nyima 旦增尼玛	"东风破"	"干杯朋友"	Wang Xuan 王轩
Episode 7 (31 August)						
Episode 7 (31 August)	Harlem Yu	1	Suzanne Low 刘思延	"想你的夜"		June Wong 黄玉儿
Episode 7 (31 August)	Harlem Yu	2	Nigel Tay 郑伟杰	"如果这都不算爱"		Huang Renqin 黄稔钦
Episode 7 (31 August)	Harlem Yu	3	Li Zhenwu 黎真吾	"离人愁"		Ericson Bi 毕晓鑫
Episode 7 (31 August)	Harlem Yu	Coach's save performances				
Episode 7 (31 August)	Harlem Yu	4	Huang Renqin 黄稔钦	"轰炸"	"飞机场的10:30"	Ericson Bi 毕晓鑫
Episode 7 (31 August)	Jay Chou	5	Su Han 宿涵	"黄金甲" / "将军" / "千年之恋"		Zhang Shen'er 张神儿
Episode 7 (31 August)	Jay Chou	6	Evis Wy	"爱你的记忆" / "Remember the Time"		Bryce Wu 吴奇
Episode 7 (31 August)	Jay Chou	7	Cering 周兴才让	"再见萤火虫"		Golden Eggplosives 金色炸蛋
Episode 7 (31 August)	Jay Chou	Coach's save performances				
Episode 7 (31 August)	Jay Chou	8	Zhang Shen'er 张神儿	"纪念"	"不能说的秘密" / "Blank Space"	Golden Eggplosives 金色炸蛋

1. Li Jian was unable to choose a winner between Li Zhiyu 李志宇 and Wang Xuan 王轩 as he believed that the previous two losing artists from his team had performed better than the pair. As such, he sought approval from the producers and other coaches to allow all four artists to perform in the coach's save round where he would choose two to advance to the Cross Battles.

== The Cross Battles ==
This season saw the return of the Cross Battles, which was last featured in the first season of the show. In the Cross Battles, coaches would have to compete with an opposing coach with their remaining artists for a spot in the Top 14, and a new rule was set this season to have the new coaches going head-to-head against the veteran coaches. Through the random drawing of lots, new coach Li Jian picked veteran coach Harlem Yu as his opposing coach, and therefore Jay Chou was defaulted to compete against Nicholas Tse in the Cross Battles.

Before the start of the Cross Battles, the coaches would decide on the appearance order of their artists, and this was done without the knowledge of their opposing coach. Therefore, all artists would not know who they are competing against until they were revealed on stage by the host. The coaches were also allowed to modify the appearance order of their artists at any point in the competition to counter the opposing artists in the remaining Cross Battles.

A total of four Cross Battles were held between two opposing coaches. At the end of each Cross Battle, the artist who received the most votes from the 51-person judging panel would win one point for their team, while the losing artist would not receive any. Each of the coaches was also given a trump card which they could exercise on one of their artists to allow the latter to win two points for the team if he wins the Cross Battles (if the artist loses the Cross Battle, the trump card would be forfeited). The allocation of the trump card to the artist has to be done by the coach before the artist was revealed on stage.

At the end of the Cross Battles, the team with the highest number of winning points will advance to the Cross Knockouts, and one artist from the losing team would be eliminated by coach as a penalty for losing the Cross Battles.

Colour key

	Artist was given the coach's trump card
	Artist won the Cross Battle (one or two points allocated to the team)
	Artist lost the Cross Battle (no points allocated to the team)
	Team won the Cross Battles with highest winning points
✔	Artist advanced to the Cross Knockouts
✘	Artist was eliminated by coach

Episode	Order	Song	Team Jay	Result		Team Nicholas	Song
Episode	Order	Song	Team Jay	2	4	Team Nicholas	Song
Episode 8 (7 September)	1	"夜的第七章"	Su Han 宿涵 ✔	33	18	Double Angel 打包安琪 ✔	"威廉古堡" / "Break Away" / "Let Me Hear" / "斗牛"
Episode 8 (7 September)	2	"你是我永远的乡愁"	Cering 周兴才让 ✔	20	31	Deng Zixiao 邓紫霄 ✔	"Never Enough"
Episode 8 (7 September)	3	"不爱跳舞"	Evis Wy ✘	10	41	Vash Hsu 徐暐翔 ✔	"唯一"
Episode 8 (7 September)	4	"大火"	Zhang Shen'er 张神儿 ✔	13	38	Liu Junge 刘郡格 ✔	"作曲家"
Episode 9 (14 September)	Order	Song	Team Li Jian	Result		Team Harlem	Song
Episode 9 (14 September)	Order	Song	Team Li Jian	2	3	Team Harlem	Song
Episode 9 (14 September)	1	"芬芳一生"	Gary Zhao 赵家豪 ✘	5	46	Li Zhenwu 黎真吾 ✔	"玫瑰·火"
Episode 9 (14 September)	2	"温暖"	Tiger 谭秋娟 ✔	44	7	Huang Renqin 黄稔钦 ✔	"Say a Lil Something"
Episode 9 (14 September)	3	"月牙泉"	Tenzin Nyima 旦增尼玛 ✔	31	20	Nigel Tay 郑伟杰 ✔	"忘情水"
Episode 9 (14 September)	4	"今天是你的生日，妈妈"	Kang Shulong 康树龙 ✔	21	30	Suzanne Low 刘思延 ✔	"世界唯一的你"

== The Cross Knockouts ==
The Cross Knockout rounds began airing on 21 September and would end on the following week on 28 September. The Cross Knockouts would see the remaining 14 artists from various teams competing for a spot in the Top 7. The coaches would each take turn to send one of their artists out for the Cross Knockouts, with the selected artist named as the "Challenger". The "Challenger" would then pick an opposing team to compete against in the Cross Knockout. The specific artist from the opposing team which the "Challenger" would compete against, named as the "Challengee", would be decided via the random drawing of lots by the former. The "Challenger" would perform first, followed by the "Challengee".

At the end of each Cross Knockout, the two artists will receive votes of approval from a 51-person judging panel. The other two non-competitive coaches were also given one vote each which they have to cast for either one of the artists in the Cross Knockout pairing. The artist with the most votes will advance to the Playoffs, while the other would be eliminated.

Colour key

Artist won the Cross Knockout and advanced to the Playoffs
Artist lost the Cross Knockout and was eliminated

Episode	Coach	Order	Artist	Song	Panel votes	Coach votes				Total votes	Result
Episode	Coach	Order	Artist	Song	Panel votes	Nicholas	Jay	Harlem	Li Jian	Total votes	Result
Episode 10 (21 September)											
Episode 10 (21 September)	Harlem Yu	1.1	Li Zhenwu 黎真吾	"圈"	26	—	—	—	✔	27	Advanced
Episode 10 (21 September)	Nicholas Tse	1.2	Vash Hsu 徐暐翔	"黑色柳丁"	25	—	✔	—	—	26	Eliminated
Episode 10 (21 September)	Nicholas Tse	2.1	Liu Junge 刘郡格	"Bad Boy" / "Bad"	38	—	✔	—	✔	40	Advanced
Episode 10 (21 September)	Harlem Yu	2.2	Huang Renqin 黄稔钦	"九月的故事"	13	—	—	—	—	13	Eliminated
Episode 10 (21 September)	Li Jian	3.1	Kang Shulong 康树龙	"像我这样的人"	13	—	—	✔	—	14	Eliminated
Episode 10 (21 September)	Nicholas Tse	3.2	Double Angel 打包安琪^{1}	"贝加尔湖畔" / "Faded"	38	—	✔	—	—	39	Advanced
Episode 10 (21 September)	Jay Chou	4.1	Cering 周兴才让	"假行僧"	35	—	—	✔	✔	37	Advanced
Episode 10 (21 September)	Nicholas Tse	4.2	Deng Zixiao 邓紫霄	"别废话"	16	—	—	—	—	16	Eliminated
Episode 12 (28 September)											
Episode 12 (28 September)	Harlem Yu	1.1	Nigel Tay 郑伟杰	"情非得已" / "How Deep Is Your Love"	25	✔	✔	—	—	27	Advanced
Episode 12 (28 September)	Li Jian	1.2	Tiger 谭秋娟	"Havana" / "Smooth"	26	—	—	—	—	26	Eliminated
Episode 12 (28 September)	Li Jian	2.1	Tenzin Nyima 旦增尼玛	"莫尼山"	38	✔	—	✔	—	40	Advanced
Episode 12 (28 September)	Jay Chou	2.2	Zhang Shen'er 张神儿	"连名带姓"	13	—	—	—	—	13	Eliminated
Episode 12 (28 September)	Jay Chou	3.1	Su Han 宿涵	"Look at Me Now" / "四面楚歌" / "懦夫" / "霍元甲"	40	✔	—	—	✔	42	Advanced
Episode 12 (28 September)	Harlem Yu	3.2	Suzanne Low 刘思延	"爱爱爱"	11	—	—	—	—	11	Eliminated

1. Huang Anqi 黄安琪 of Double Angel 打包安琪 voluntarily withdrew from this stage of the competition onwards due to the "physical and mental discomfort" arose from her participation in the competition. The other member of the group, Liu Anqi 刘安琪, moved on as a solo artist, but would still be credited as "Double Angel 打包安琪" on the show.

Non-competition performances
Order	Performers	Song
10.1	Nicholas Tse & his team (Deng Zixiao 邓紫霄, Double Angel 打包安琪, Liu Junge 刘郡格 & Vash Hsu 徐暐翔)	"光辉岁月"
10.2	Jay Chou & his team (Cering 周兴才让, Su Han 宿涵 & Zhang Shen'er 张神儿)	"斗牛"
12.1	Harlem Yu & his team (Huang Renqin 黄稔钦, Li Zhenwu 黎真吾, Nigel Tay 郑伟杰 & Suzanne Low 刘思延)	"老实情歌"
12.2	Li Jian & his team (Kang Shulong 康树龙, Tenzin Nyima 旦增尼玛 & Tiger 谭秋娟)	"沧海轻舟"

== The Playoffs ==
The Top 7 performed in the Playoffs for a spot in the finals. The order of appearance of the artists was decided through the drawing of lots by their respective coaches. In deciding who moves on, a professional judging panel made up of 50 veteran record producers, music critics, and media practitioners from various media companies; as well as the studio audience made up of 500 members of the public were given an equal say. Each of the voters was entitled to one vote per artist, and they can either choose to vote or not vote for a particular artist. The total number of votes cast by the professional judging panel and studio audience were converted into points accordingly to the weightage (50% each). The five artists with the highest accumulated total points would advance to the finals.

Colour key

Artist received the highest accumulated total points and advanced to the finals
Artist received the lowest accumulated total points and was eliminated

Episode	Coach	Order	Artist	Song	Judges votes (points)	Public votes (points)	Total points	Result
Episode 13 (30 September)	Jay Chou	1	Su Han 宿涵	"同一种调调" / "In the End" / "跨时代"	48 (48.0)	463 (46.3)	94.3	Advanced
Episode 13 (30 September)	Nicholas Tse	2	Double Angel 打包安琪	"天黑黑"	31 (31.0)	406 (40.6)	71.6	Eliminated
Episode 13 (30 September)	Harlem Yu	3	Nigel Tay 郑伟杰	"情网"	36 (36.0)	324 (32.4)	68.4	Eliminated
Episode 13 (30 September)	Li Jian	4	Tenzin Nyima 旦增尼玛	"九月" / "牧歌"	50 (50.0)	483 (48.3)	98.3	Advanced
Episode 13 (30 September)	Jay Chou	5	Cering 周兴才让	"阿刁"	40 (40.0)	386 (38.6)	78.6	Advanced
Episode 13 (30 September)	Harlem Yu	6	Li Zhenwu 黎真吾	"会没事的"	42 (42.0)	416 (41.6)	83.6	Advanced
Episode 13 (30 September)	Nicholas Tse	7	Liu Junge 刘郡格	"青春修炼手册"	37 (37.0)	438 (43.8)	80.8	Advanced

Non-competition performances
Order	Performers	Song
13.1	The Top 7	"仰世而来"

== Finals ==
The Top 5 performed live in a two-part season finale on 7 October, held at the Beijing National Stadium. In the first round of the competition, the five finalists performed a duet with their coach, and a solo song. Based on the public votes received from the live audience at the end of the first round, the bottom three artists with the fewest votes would be eliminated.

The final two artists would then sing their winner's song before a 100-person panel and live audience, who will vote for the winner at the end of the performances. Every member of the panel would be entitled to one vote, and the total number of votes received by the artists from the panel and live audience would be converted into percentage points accordingly. The artist who received the highest number of points would be announced as the winner.

Coach	Artist	Round 1					Round 2					Result
Coach	Artist	Order	Duet song (with coach)	Order	Solo song	Public votes	Order	Winner's song	Panel votes	Public votes (points)	Total points	Result
Jay Chou	Su Han 宿涵	1	"将军" / "乱舞春秋"^{1} ^{3}	6	"饕餮" / "以父之名"	7,980	N/A (already eliminated)					Fourth place
Harlem Yu	Li Zhenwu 黎真吾	2	"准备好了没有"	7	"让我留在你身边"	8,325	11	"如果还有明天"	23	9,206 (40)	63	Runner-up
Li Jian	Tenzin Nyima 旦增尼玛	3	"水流众生" / "Pi's Lullaby"^{3}	8	"念亲恩" / "晚霞中的红蜻蜓"	9,805	12	"流浪记" / "在那草地上" / "天边"	77	13,883 (60)	137	Winner
Nicholas Tse	Liu Junge 刘郡格	4	"黄种人"	9	"空城"	8,007	N/A (already eliminated)					Third place
Jay Chou	Cering 周兴才让	5	"本草纲目"^{2}	10	"轮回"	5,669	N/A (already eliminated)					Fifth place

1. The performance featured fellow team members Golden Eggplosives 金色炸蛋.
2. The performance featured fellow team member Zhang Shen'er 张神儿.
3. Before the start of the solo performances in the first round, it was revealed that Su Han 宿涵 and Tenzin Nyima 旦增尼玛 were leading in the number of public votes.

Non-competition performances
Order	Performer(s)	Song
14.1	Momo Wu	"冲一波"
14.2	The Top 24 (minus Ericson Bi 毕晓鑫 & Wang Xuan 王轩)	"千山万水"

== Non-competition shows ==
=== The Mid-Autumn Special (24 September) ===
The eleventh episode was a two-hour special aired on 24 September, featuring performances by the coaches and artists in celebration of the Mid-Autumn Festival. The episode was hosted by Rosy Luo.

Episode	Order	Performer(s)	Song
Episode 11 (24 September)	1	Tenzin Nyima 旦增尼玛	"隐形纪念"
Episode 11 (24 September)	2	Cering 周兴才让	"你是我永远的乡愁"
Episode 11 (24 September)	3	Nicholas Tse	"空"
Episode 11 (24 September)	4	Li Jiadan 李佳丹	"英雄"
Episode 11 (24 September)	5	Jay Chou	"轨迹"
Episode 11 (24 September)	6	Su Han 宿涵	"夜的第七章"
Episode 11 (24 September)	7	Jay Chou	"发如雪"
Episode 11 (24 September)	8	Li Jian	"心升明月"
Episode 11 (24 September)	9	Gary Zhao 赵家豪 (with Chen Ni, Wang Shuqing, Zhang Hantong & Zhu Runzhe)	"慢慢喜欢你" / "虫儿飞"
Episode 11 (24 September)	10	Li Jian	"假如爱有天意"
Episode 11 (24 September)	11	Wang Chao 王朝	"黄河谣"
Episode 11 (24 September)	12	Li Zhenwu 黎真吾	"山海"
Episode 11 (24 September)	13	June Wong 黄玉儿 & David Nooi	"Love Song"
Episode 11 (24 September)	14	Harlem Yu	"猴喜翻"
Episode 11 (24 September)	15	Harlem Yu	"关不掉的月光"

== Reception ==
=== CSM52 ratings ===
Episode		Original airdate	Production	Time slot (UTC+8)	Rating	Share	Ranking	Source
1	"The Blind Auditions Premiere"	13 July 2018	301	Friday 9:10 p.m.	1.730	7.38	1	
2	"The Blind Auditions, Part 2"	27 July 2018	302	Friday 9:10 p.m.	2.120	9.33	1	
3	"The Blind Auditions, Part 3"	3 August 2018	303	Friday 9:10 p.m.	1.983	8.95	1	
4	"The Blind Auditions, Part 4"	10 August 2018	304	Friday 9:10 p.m.	1.670	7.49	1	
5	"The Blind Auditions, Part 5"	17 August 2018	305	Friday 9:10 p.m.	1.907	8.88	1	
6	"The Battles Premiere"	24 August 2018	306	Friday 9:10 p.m.	1.674	7.51	1	
7	"The Battles, Part 2"	31 August 2018	307	Friday 9:10 p.m.	1.454	6.94	1	
8	"The Cross Battles Premiere"	7 September 2018	308	Friday 9:10 p.m.	1.906	8.74	1	
9	"The Cross Battles, Part 2"	14 September 2018	309	Friday 9:10 p.m.	1.814	8.49	1	
10	"The Cross Knockouts Premiere"	21 September 2018	310	Friday 9:10 p.m.	1.464	6.92	1	
11	"The Mid-Autumn Special"	24 September 2018	311	Monday 9:10 p.m.	0.552	2.58	2	
12	"The Cross Knockouts, Part 2"	28 September 2018	312	Friday 9:10 p.m.	1.068	5.34	2	
13	"The Playoffs"	30 September 2018	313	Sunday 9:10 p.m.	1.113	5.317	3	
14	"The Finals"	7 October 2018	314	Sunday 9:10 p.m.	1.701	6.78	1	
15	"Macau Concert"	12 October 2018	315	Friday 9:10 p.m.				
