= An Ideal =

Studio album by Ronghao Li
- Released: January 22, 2016
- Genre: Mandopop; Pop
- Length: 53:04
- Label: Warner Music Taiwan
- Producer: Ronghao Li

Ronghao Li chronology
Li Ronghao (2014)	An Ideal (2016)

Singles from An Ideal
- 1. "Turnaround" Released: May 27, 2015; 2. "Stubborn Love" Released: April 28, 2015; 3. "Wild Animals" Released: December 28, 2015; 4. "Full House" Released: January 11, 2016

An Ideal (Chinese: 有理想; pinyin: Yǒu Líxiǎng) is the third studio album by Chinese singer-songwriter Ronghao Li, released on January 22, 2016, by Warner Music Taiwan. The album contains 11 songs, with the album's total length being 53:04 minutes.

== Information ==
The following is the official comment on An Ideal's release: "Staying ordinary in an extraordinary world, with his (Ronghao Li) music, slowly disintegrating the veil of lies we've been wearing. They call it an ideal, something extraordinary, but at the same time ordinary. Even though stumbled over rocks and lost our ways in the mist, it doesn't mean it's over. Living in the day, living in the night, venturing through this metropolis, we all see things with our own way. But why not observe our world with Ronghao Li's perspective. See things in a new way. See loneliness in a new way. See sadness in a new way. In a brighter way. And sing our ideals."

== Track listing ==
No.	Title	Lyrics	Music	Translation	Length
1.	"野生動物"	Wyman Wong	Ronghao Li	Wild Animals	4:55
2.	"滿座"	Ronghao Li	Ronghao Li	Full House	5:32
3.	"有理想"	Ronghao Li	Ronghao Li	An Ideal	3:48
4.	"爸爸媽媽"	Ronghao Li	Ronghao Li	Mama & Papa	4:44
5.	"流行歌曲"	Ronghao Li	Ronghao Li	Popular Song	4:19
6.	"優點"	Ronghao Li	Ronghao Li	Merit	5:11
7.	"不將就"	Wyman Wong	Ronghao Li	Can't Bear It	5:13
8.	"心裡面"	Ronghao Li	Ronghao Li	In My Heart	4:59
9.	"女孩"	Ronghao Li, Dawei Ge (葛大為)	Ronghao Li	Girls	4:28
10.	"宛若新生"	Ronghao Li	Ronghao Li	Turnaround	3:46
11.	"大太陽"	Ronghao Li	Ronghao Li	The Big Sun	6:05
Total length:					53:04

== Critical reception ==
An Ideal has average to positive reviews on Douban, which is the Chinese equivalent of IMDB, 6.6 out of 10, with 1669 critics and listeners, with most of them (33.5%) giving the album 3/5 stars. Most of the audience gave the album 1 to 3 stars whilst the critics gave the album 3-5 stars out of 5. Most of the critics commented on Ronghao Li's slight change of style, commenting "kind of disappointing", "lyrics sounds great, music sounds rushed", etc. Most of the audience thought that this album is "bland and boring". However, some critics praised Ronghao Li's change of style, and some thought that the album's quality is still very high. Most audiences and critics, however, came to a consensus that the overall quality has, in fact, fallen, compared to the previous albums.

== Awards ==
On 15 April 2016, An Ideal won the Chinese Album of the Year award.
