= Li Ronghao =

Chinese musical artist (born 1985)

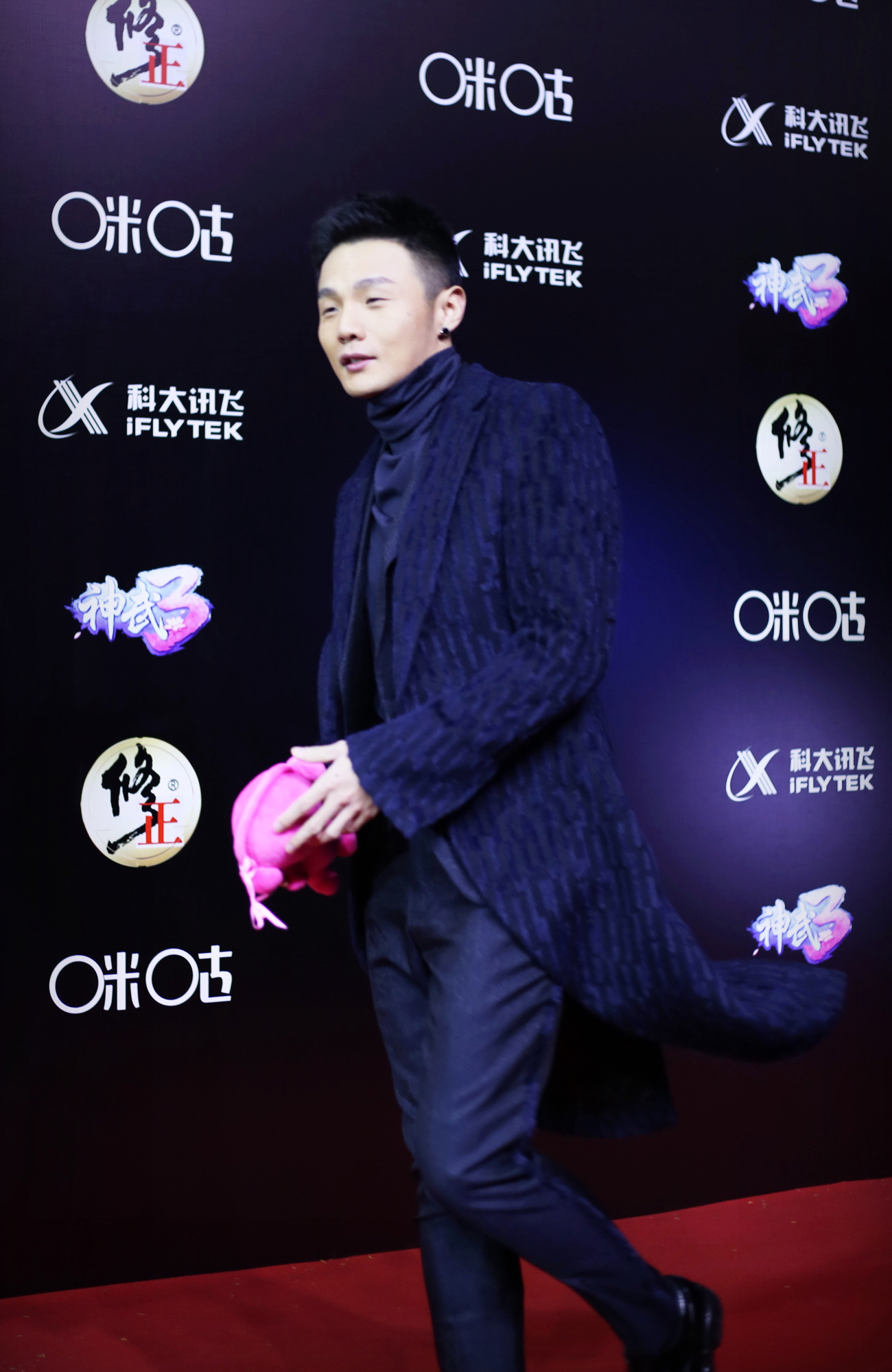
- Li in 2017
- Born: July 11, 1985 (age 41); Bengbu, Anhui, China
- Occupations: Singer, producer, actor
- Years active: 2004–present
- Spouse: Rainie Yang (m. 2019)

Chinese name
- Simplified Chinese: 李荣浩
- Traditional Chinese: 李榮浩
Transcriptions
Standard Mandarin
- Hanyu Pinyin: Lǐ Rónghào
- Musical career
- Instruments: Vocals, guitar, piano, bass, and keyboard
- Labels: Warner Music Group, Linfair Records

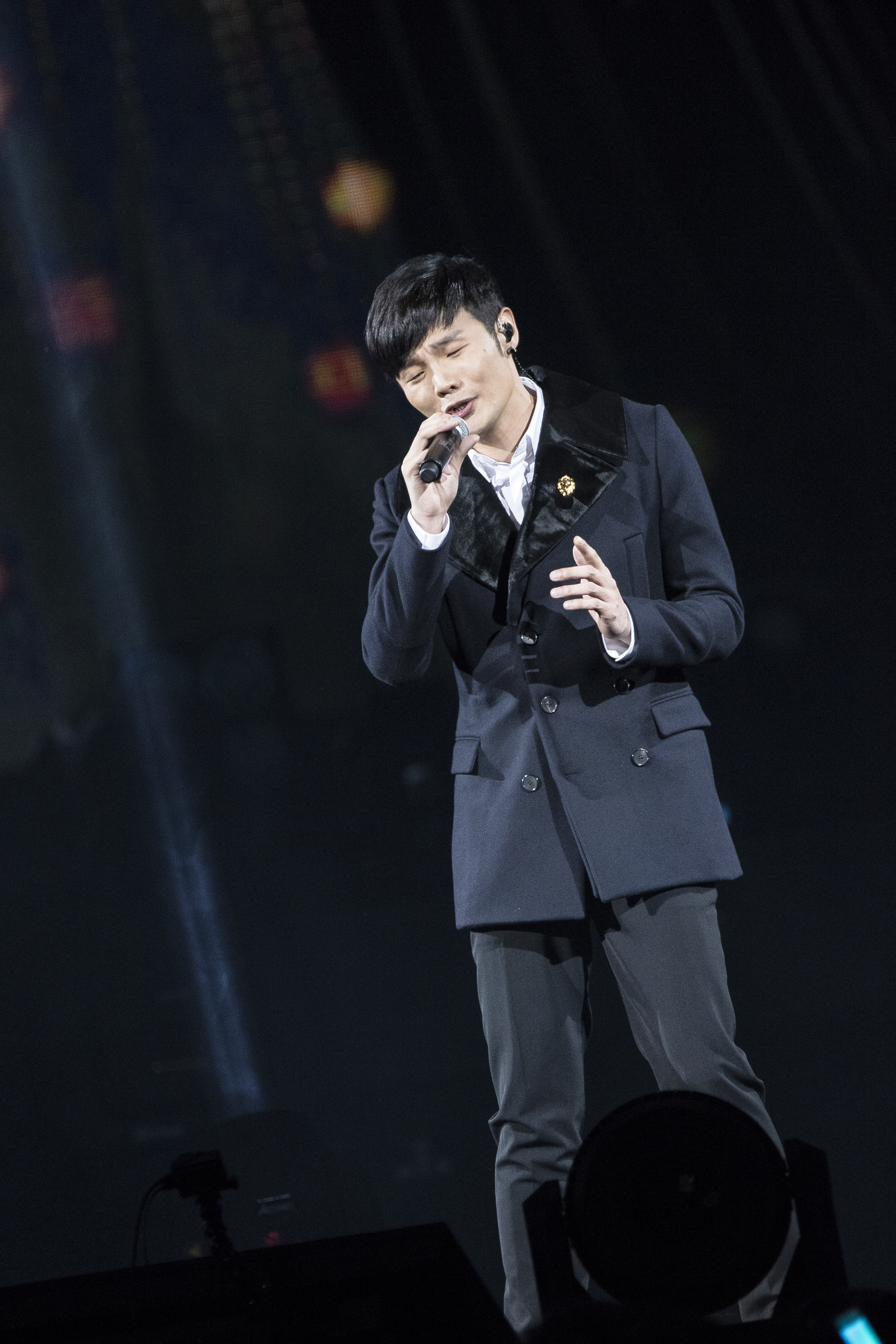
Li performing at KKBOX Music Awards, 2015

Li Ronghao (traditional Chinese: 李榮浩; simplified Chinese: 李荣浩; pinyin: Lǐ Rónghào; born July 11, 1985) is a Chinese singer-songwriter and actor. Initially a music producer, he achieved breakout success as a singer with his debut album Model (2013), for which he won the Golden Melody Award for Best New Singer. From 2019 to 2022, he served as a coach on Sing! China for four seasons.

Li was ranked 59th on the Forbes China Celebrity 100 List for 2020.

== History ==
Li Ronghao's first studio album, Model, was released in 2013 with label Linfair Records. The album was nominated for Best Album and Li was nominated for Best Male Singer, Best Lyricist, Best Newcomer and Best Producer at the 25th Golden Melody Awards, and won the Best New Singer award.

In August 2014, Li signed with label Warner Records. Later that year, he released the concept EP Dear Composer and quickly gained popularity, becoming MusicRadio China's most popular new singer. In September that year, he released his second album, Ronghao Li. This album won the Best Chinese Album award as well as the Most Influential New Singer award at the 2015 QQ Annual Music Festival. The song King of Comedy from Ronghao Li was nominated for the Best Lyricist Award at the 26th Golden Melody Awards as well as winning the Song of the Year award during the 5th Global Pop Song Charts.

His third album An Ideal, released in 2015, received average to positive reviews on Chinese ratings site Douban, with many critics remarking on Li's slight change of style. The song Stubborn Love (不将就) from An Ideal hit number 1 on Taiwan's iTunes Popular Singles Chart in April 2015.

Li made a special appearance in the movie Duckweed, which was released in January 2017. He also participated in the second season The Voice of China as an advisor to Eason Chan, one of the coaches on the show, and their team won the Best Team award that season.

In 2018, Li starred in the film Keep Calm and Be a Superstar alongside Li Yitong and Eason Chan. Li was the vocal instructor for Idol Producer. He reprised the role for the second season in 2019. Li also released his 5th album "Ear" in 2018. The song If I Were Young was a massive hit in Taiwan and mainland China, and the music video reached over 100 million views on YouTube. The song was ranked 2nd on the China Billboard Radio Top 10 Songs, only behind Jay Chou's Waiting For You.

From 2019 to 2022, he served as a coach on Sing! China (a rebranded version of The Voice of China) for four seasons. He was crowned as the winning coach of the Sing China 2019 as Xing Hanming from Team Ronghao won the competition.

== Personal life ==
From 2011 to early 2015, Li was in a relationship with model and singer Lu Yao, who inspired his breakout song Model and appeared in the music video for his song Two People.

In January 2015, Li posted a close-up selfie with Taiwanese singer Rainie Yang on Weibo but quickly deleted it. On September 16, 2017, Li and Yang went public with their relationship. In 2019, they registered their marriage in Hefei, Anhui.

== Discography ==
- Model (2013)
- Ronghao Li (2014)
- An Ideal (2016)
- En (2017)
- Ear (2018)
- Sparrow (2020)
- Free Soul (2022)
- The Dark Horse (2024)

== Tours ==
- Born Tour (2015–2015)
- An Ideal World Tour (2016–2018)
- If I Were Young World Tour (2019–2020)
- Free Soul World Tour (2023–2024)
- Dark Horse World Tour (2025–Present)

== Filmography ==
- Duckweed (2017)
- Keep Calm and Be a Superstar (2018)
- Always Miss You (2019)
- Idol Producer (2018)
- Youth with You 1 (2019)
- Youth with You 3 (2021)

== Awards and accolades ==
Year	Award / Music festival	Category	Recipient(s) / Nominee(s)	Result	Ref.
2014	25th Golden Melody Awards	Best New Singer	Li Ronghao	Won	
2014	25th Golden Melody Awards	Best Male Chinese Singer	Li Ronghao	Nominated	
2014	25th Golden Melody Awards	Best Album Producer	Model	Nominated	
2014	25th Golden Melody Awards	Best Lyrics	Model	Nominated	
2014	25th Golden Melody Awards	Best Chinese Album	Model	Nominated	
2014	2013 China TOP Music Awards	Most Influential New Singer	Li Ronghao	Nominated	
2014	2nd YinYue V Radio Awards	Chinese Singer of the Year	Li Ronghao	Won	
2015	5th Global Pop Song Charts	MusicRadio Best Singer	Li Ronghao	Won	
2015	5th Global Pop Song Charts	Original Singer of the Year	Li Ronghao	Won	
2015	5th Global Pop Song Charts	Song of the Year	King of Comedy	Won	
2015	26th Golden Melody Awards	Best Lyrics Award	King of Comedy	Nominated	
2015	Kuwo Asia Music Festival	Most Suggested Artist	Li Ronghao	Won	
2015	Kuwo Asia Music Festival	Most Potential Singer/Songwriter	Li Ronghao	Won	
2015	3rd Annual YinYue V Radio Awards	Best Album Producer	Li Ronghao	Won	
2015	3rd Annual YinYue V Radio Awards	Most Suggested Artist	Li Ronghao	Won	
2015	2015 QQ Music Charts Festival	Most Suggested Artist – YinYue V	Li Ronghao	Won	
2015	2015 QQ Music Charts Festival	Chinese Album of the Year	Ronghao Li	Won	
2016	20th Annual Global Chinese Charts	Best Album Award	An Ideal	Won	
2019	30th Golden Melody Awards	Best Composition	“Growing Fond of You” (from Half Time )	Nominated	
2019	30th Golden Melody Awards	Best Mandarin Male Singer	Li Ronghao- Ear	Nominated	

Forbes Celebrity List
Year	Rank	Change
2020	59th	N/A
