= Lars Huang =

Chinese singer and musician (born 1999)

- 黄子弘凡
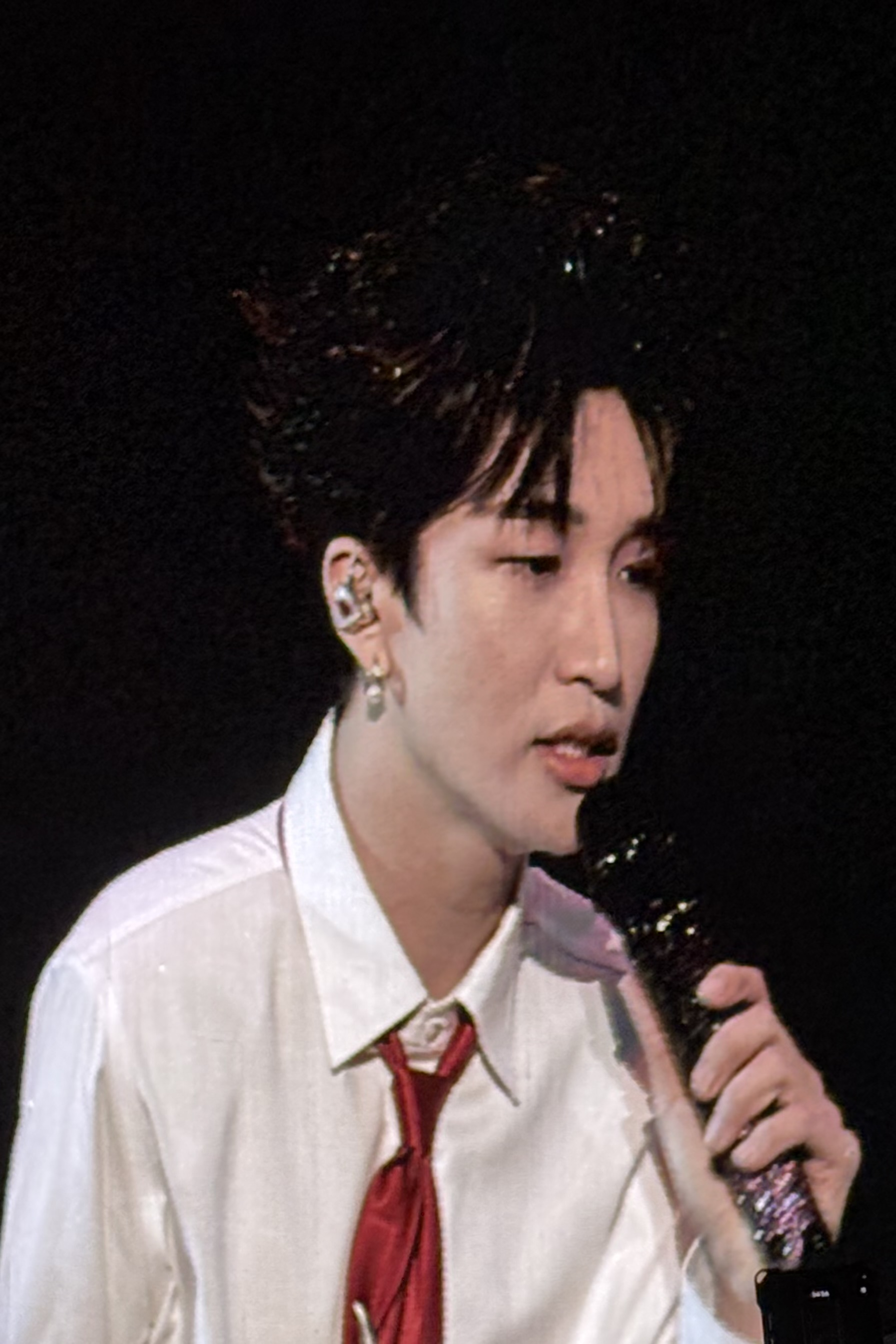
- Huang performing in Macau, February 2025
- Born: 21 April 1999 (age 27); Lanzhou, Gansu, China
- Education: Berklee College of Music
- Occupations: Singer; actor
- Years active: 2018–present

Lars Huang
- Traditional Chinese: 黄子弘凡
- Simplified Chinese: 黄子弘凡
Transcriptions
Standard Mandarin
- Hanyu Pinyin: Huáng Zǐhóngfán

Lars Huang (Chinese: 黄子弘凡; born 21 April 1999), is a Chinese singer and actor. He has released 3 EPs and 1 album as well as starring in one television series and 4 musicals.

== Early life ==
Huang was born in Lanzhou, Gansu, China, on 21 April 1999. His father is Huang Jinzhong, a tenor singer and national first-class actor. Both of his parents are professors at Sichuan Normal University, where his father teaches music and his mother teaches dance. Due to his parents' influence, Huang was exposed to music at an early age, primarily classical and folk music. He studied with tenor singer Dai Yuqiang and professor Zhao Dengying of the Central Conservatory of Music.

In 2017, Huang submitted videos of him singing in multiple languages to different music conservatories and was accepted by Johns Hopkins University, Berklee College of Music, New England Conservatory of Music, Boston Conservatory of Music, Manhattan Conservatory of Music, and University of Michigan-Ann Arbor. He decided to attend Berkelee College of Music, which offered him a scholarship, to study modern music production and arrangement.

== Music career ==
=== 2018-2021: Debut and signing with CCTV ===
In August 2018, Huang released his first single, a promotional song for Air China titled "Heavenly Air China" (国航天香), it was produced by his father. In October, recommended by Dai Yuqiang, Huang participated the idol competition show Super-Vocal as a member of the tenor group.

In May 2019, Huang performed on the Super-Vocal 2019 Tour. In June, he joined the Blue in Your Eyes (你眼里的蓝) tour as a guest. In August, he joined the variety show Flowery New World (花样新世界) as a regular cast member. On 30 August, he performed at the 2019 FIBA Basketball World Cup opening ceremony. In October, Huang attended the Shanghai premiere of Ang Lee's Gemini Man in October. On 1 November, he won Outstanding Youth Role Model of the Year award at the 2019 NetEase Entertainment Award Ceremony. In December, he performed "With Our Motherland" (和祖国在一起) with Lu Yupeng and Ma Jia at the 2019 China TV Drama Awards

In 2020, Huang made his acting debut in the web series Dim Light in the Shadow (那年夏天的秘密) At the Guangdong TV New Year's Gala on 25 January, Huang performed "Spring Festival Overture" (春天序曲) with Fang Shujian, Giuliano Hong, and Nan Feng; the four of them then performed "The Tide Rises in the Pearl River" (大潮起珠江) with China's Three Tenors (Dai Yuqiang, Wei Song, and Warren Mok). Huang released the English single "Waking Now" on 21 April. In May, he made his musical debut as the lead actor in Kiki's Delivery Service in January. On 18 July, he held his first live house concert titled "Fine! The World I Love" (Fine! 我热爱的世界). In October, he participated in the CCTV's talent competition show Bravo Youngsters! and placed 2nd. He was the first artist to be signed by CCTV and since appeared on numerous CCTV programs.

In February 2021, Huang performed at several CCTV Spring Festival programs as well as the TV program Folk Songs·China (民歌·中国) and the Lantern Festival Opera Gala. In March, Huang was a regular guest on the CCTV talk show Play the Play (剧说很好看). He performed at the Youth Day Special Program on 4 May with Roy Wang and others, the Global Variety Show on 11 July, and Qixi Festival Party on 14 August. All were CCTV programs as well. In June, Huang starred in the Chinese version of the musical Maybe Happy Ending, written by Will Aronson and Hue Park.

=== 2022-Present: EPs and first album Fun!Only ===
On 25 January 2022, Huang performed at the CCTV's Online Spring Festival Gala for the second year in a row and the Jilin TV Spring Festival Gala. He continued to appear on CCTV programs throughout the year. On 21 April 2022, Huang released his first EP, If I Wasn't Transparent (如果我不是透明的). In November, he starred in the musical The Strange Stories of the Tang Dynasty: Mandala (唐朝诡事录之曼陀罗), adapted from the television series The Strange Stories of the Tang Dynasty (唐朝诡事录), it premiered at the Changsha Meixihu International Culture and Arts Centre. In December, he participated in season 6 of Detective Academy (名侦探学院).

On 9 January 2023, Huang held the Let's Be Friends (交个朋友) live house concert in Chengdu, which was originally scheduled on 23 April 2022 but was postponed due to COVID-19 prevention precautions. He performed at the 2023 Sichuan and Chongqing Spring Festival Gala and 2023 Hunan Satellite TV Mango TV Lantern Festival Gala. The latter was aired on Mango TV, where Huang appeared on multiple programs such as Who's the Murderer VIII (大侦探第八季), season 5 of Great Escape (密室大逃脱大神版), seasons 1 and 2 of A Journey For No.1 (跳进地理书的旅行), season 1 of Forest Evolutionism (森林进化论), and season 7 of Detective Academy On 11 November, Huang embarked on his first tour, Dream Catcher Diary (捕梦日记), for a total of six shows in theaters in Beijing, Guangdong, Hangzhou, Wuhan, Shanghai, and Changsha. He released his second EP Wonderful Players of the Big World (大世界的奇妙玩家) on 29 November. Huang also performed at multiple music festivals throughout the year.

In February 2024, Huang performed at multiple Spring Festival related events, including the China Internet Audiovisual Annual Ceremony (中国网络视听年度盛典), the New Year's Intangible Cultural Heritage Night (新春非遗之夜), Douyin Colorful Heritage Gala (抖音华彩传承晚会), and Guangdong-Hong Kong-Macao Greater Bay Area Spring Festival Gala (粤港澳大湾区春节晚会). In March 2024, Huang starred in the jukebox musical I Want You (我要你), featuring many well-known theme songs from television series and films. On 17 July, Huang released his third EP But I Know It All (可是我最懂降落). In August, he returned to season 3 of A Journey For No.1 (跳进地理书的旅行). From August to October, Huang was a main cast member on the variety show Melody Journey, two of the songs he performed on the show were later released as singles: "Laughing on the Outside" (好的, 没关系, 都可以) and "Do U". On 22 October, Huang released his first album Fun!Only (除了快乐禁止入内), it sold more than 150,000 copies and ranked 5th on Tencent Music's Yearly Physical Albums Sales Chart. He then embarked on his second tour, Fun!Only (除了快乐禁止入内), on 26 October, with the venues upgraded to arenas. In December, he appeared on the final season of the Youku variety show Mars Intelligence Agency.

On 28 January 2025, Huang made his debut appearance at the 2025 CMG New Year's Gala, performing "Properly" (妥妥的) as part of an ensemble. His Fun!Only tour continued in 2025, with the number of shows increased from one per stop to two in Macau, Xian, Hangzhou, Chongqing, and Guangzhou.

== Discography ==
=== Albums ===
- Fun!Only (2024)

=== EPs ===
- If I Wasn't Transparent (2022)
- Wonderful Players of the Big World (2023)
- But I Know It All (2024)

== Concert tours ==
- Fine! The World I Love Concert (1 show)
1. 18 July 2020, Shanghai Poly City Theater
- Let's Be Friends Concert (1 show)
1. 9 January 2020, Chengdu Luhu Water Theater
- Dream Catcher Diary Concert Tour (6 shows)
1. 11 November 2023, Beijing Erqi Theater
2. 26 November 2023, Guangdong Art Theatre
3. 29 December 2023, Hangzhou Theater
4. 7 January 2024, Wuhan Qintai Grand Theatre
5. 13 January 2024, Shanghai Poly Theater
6. 3 February 2024, Changsha Meixihu International Culture and Arts Centre Theater
- Fun!Only Concert Tour (in progress)
1. 26 October 2024, Mercedes-Benz Arena
2. 16 November 2024, Wukesong Arena
3. 7 December 2024, Dong'an Lake Sports Park Multifunctional Arena
4. 21 December 2024, Nanjing Youth Olympic Sports Park Arena
5. 28 December 2024, Xiamen Olympic Sports Center-Phoenix Arena
6. 22 February 2025, Galaxy Arena
7. 23 February 2025, Galaxy Arena
8. 22 March 2025, Xi'an Olympic Sports Center
9. 23 March 2025, Xi'an Olympic Sports Center
10. 19 April 2025, Hangzhou Olympic Sports Center Arena
11. 20 April 2025, Hangzhou Olympic Sports Center Arena
12. 10 May 2025, HUAXI LIVE·Yudong
13. 11 May 2025, HUAXI LIVE·Yudong
14. 24 May 2025, Guangzhou International Sports Arena
15. 25 May 2025, Guangzhou International Sports Arena
16. 12 July 2025, Tianjin Olympic Centre Arena
