= Joker Xue discography =

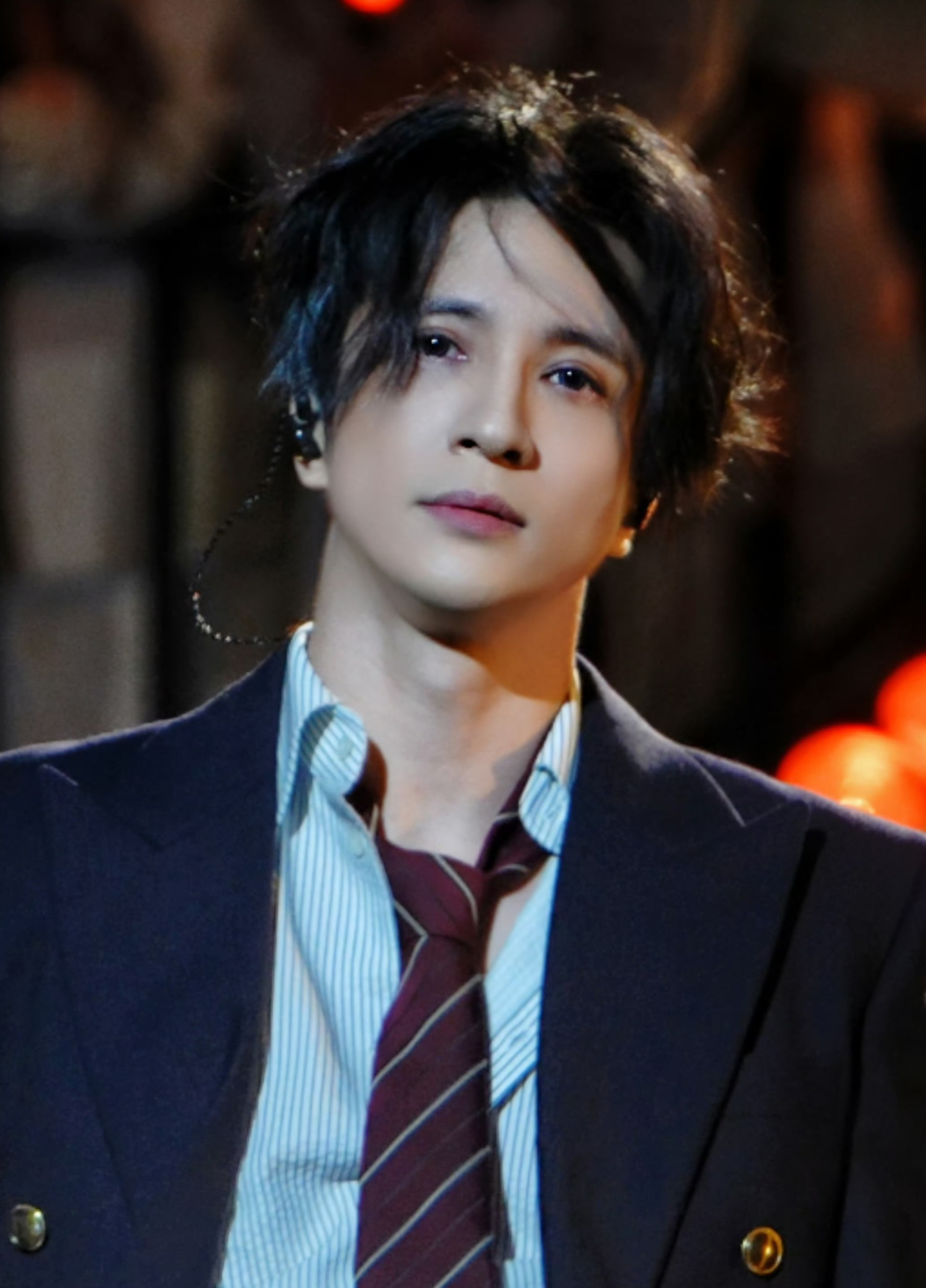
- Xue in June 2025, Bilibili Forever 22 Graduation Concert
- Studio albums: 13
- EPs: 2
- Singles: 85
- Music videos: 83

The discography of Chinese singer-songwriter Joker Xue consists of 13 studio albums, 2 EPs, 85 singles, and 83 music videos. He takes an active role the creation of his albums, writing the majority of his songs. He has written more than 80 songs as a lyricist and more than 75 songs as a composer. All of Xue's albums are acquired by and currently under his own label, Chaoshi Music.

Since his seventh album, Beginner (初学者), Xue has released the songs on his albums as singles first and for free online, a deviation from the freemium business model of major Chinese music streaming platforms, such as NetEase Cloud Music and QQ Music. He explained in 2018 that he made the decision because he wants to make his music accessible so more people will listen to it and he feels he can be more sincere with his music if money is not a factor to consider.

== Studio albums ==
List of studio albums, showing selected details, and sales figures
Title	Album details	Peak chart positions		Sales
Title	Album details	CHN	TWN	Sales
Jacky (薛之謙)	Released: June 9, 2006; Label: Shang Teng, Chaoshi Music; Format: CD, digital download	—	—	CHN: 200,000
How Are You? (你過得好嗎)	Released: July 31, 2007; Label: Shang Teng, Chaoshi Music; Format: CD, digital download	—	—	CHN: 150,000
Deeply Loved You (深深爱过你)	Released: November 26, 2008; Label: Shang Teng, Chaoshi Music; Format: CD, digital download	—	—	
Unfinished Songs (未完成的歌)	Released: December 11, 2009; Label: Shang Teng, Chaoshi Music; Format: CD, digital download	—	—	
Several Of... (几个薛之谦)	Released: August 15, 2012; Label: Shang Teng, Chaoshi Music; Format: CD, digital download	—	—	
An Unexpected Journey (意外)	Released: November 11, 2013; Label: Ocean Butterflies, Chaoshi Music; Format: CD, digital download	1	—	
Beginner (初學者)	Released: July 18, 2016; Label: Ocean Butterflies, Chaoshi Music; Format: CD, digital download, LP	—	—	
The Crossing (渡)	Released: November 28, 2017; Label: Huayu World Expo, Chaoshi Music; Format: CD, digital download	—	3	
Freak (怪咖)	Released: December 31, 2018; Label: Huayu World Expo, Chaoshi Music; Format: CD, digital download	—	—	
Dust (尘)	Released: December 27, 2019; Label: Huayu World Expo, Chaoshi Music; Format: CD, digital download	1	—	
Extraterrestrial (天外來物)	Released: December 31, 2020; Label: Huayu World Expo, Chaoshi Music; Format: CD, digital download	2	—	
Countless (无数)	Released: September 20, 2022; Label: Chaoshi Music; Format: CD, digital download	2	—	
The Guardian (守村人)	Released: November 22, 2024; Label: Chaoshi Music; Format: CD, digital download	1	—	CHN: 128,205

== Extended plays ==
Title	Details
Gentleman (绅士)	Released: June 8, 2015; Label: Ocean Butterflies, Chaoshi Music; Format: CD, digital download
Half (一半)	Released: October 19, 2015; Label: Ocean Butterflies, Chaoshi Music; Format: CD, digital download

== Singles ==
=== 2000s ===
List of singles released in the 2000s
Title	Year	Album
"Legend" (传说)	2008	Deeply Loved You
"Unfinished Songs" (未完成的歌)	2009	Unfinished Songs

=== 2010s ===
List of singles released in the 2010s
Title	Year	Peak chart positions		Album
Title	Year	CHN	SGP	Album
"I Finally Became Someone Else's Woman" (我终于成了别人的女人)	2011	—	—	Several Of...
"As Long As We Have Loved" (我们爱过就好)	2011	—	—	Several Of...
"Foreshadowing" (伏笔)	2011	—	—	Several Of...
"I Know That You Know" (我知道你都知道)	2012	—	—	Several Of...
"Radius Around You" (方圆几里)	2012	—	—	An Unexpected Journey
"Ugly" (丑八怪)	2013	—	—	An Unexpected Journey
"An Unexpected Journey" (意外)	2013	—	—	An Unexpected Journey
"Gentleman" (绅士)	2015	—	—	Beginner
"Actor" (演员)	2015	2	—	Beginner
"It's Raining" (下雨了)	2015	—	—	Beginner
"Child" (小孩)	2015	—	—	Beginner
"Half" (一半)	2015	—	—	Beginner
"Stay Here"	2015	—	—	Beginner
"Beginner" (初学者)	2016	1	—	Beginner
"Just Right" (刚刚好)	2016	2	—	Beginner
"I Think I've Seen You Somewhere" (我好像在哪见过你)	2016	7	—	Beginner
"Flower and the Youth" (花儿和少年)	2016	2	—	Beginner
"There Is Ample Time" (来日方长) (with Isabelle Huang)	2016	1	—	Non-album single
"The Martian Has Come" (火星人来过)	2016	1	—	The Crossing
"Noble" (高尚)	2017	—	—	The Crossing
"Animal World" (动物世界)	2017	1	—	The Crossing
"Ambiguous" (暧昧)	2017	1	—	The Crossing
"I'm Afraid" (我害怕)	2017	2	—	The Crossing
"Don't" (别)	2017	2	—	The Crossing
"Like the Wind" (像风一样)	2017	2	—	The Crossing
"The Crossing" (渡)	2017	5	—	The Crossing
"Camel" (骆驼)	2017	1	—	The Crossing
"Hand Behind the Back" (背过手)	2017	5	—	The Crossing
"Fox" (狐狸)	2017	1	2	Freak
"Skyscraper" (摩天大楼)	2018	1	—	Freak
"The Mute" (哑巴)	2018	2	6	Freak
"Reckless" (肆无忌惮)	2018	—	—	Freak
"Life After You Left Beijing" (那是你离开北京的生活)	2018	6	—	Freak
"Freak" (怪咖)	2018	1	—	Freak
"Express Your Feelings" (了表心意) (with Yi Yi)	2018	—	—	Non-album single
"The Best" (最好)	2018	5	—	Freak
"Forsaken Youth" (违背的青春)	2018	3	—	Freak
"Talent" (天份)	2018	1	1	Freak
"Puppet" (木偶人)	2019	1	1	Dust
"Half a Beat Slower" (慢半拍)	2019	1	4	Dust
"It's Been So Long" (这么久没见)	2019	3	—	Dust
"Mocking" (笑场)	2019	3	1	Dust
"Morbid State" (病态)	2019	4	—	Dust
"Dust" (尘)	2019	6	—	Dust
"Accompany You to Wander" (陪你去流浪)	2019	3	—	Dust
"Cooperate" (配合)	2019	9	—	Dust
"Loop" (环)	2019	19	—	Dust
"Express Your Feelings" (聊表心意) (with Liu Xijun)	2019	6	—	Dust
"—" denotes releases that did not chart or chart did not exist.

=== 2020s ===
List of singles released in the 2020s
Title	Year	Peak chart positions		Album
Title	Year	CHN	SGP	Album
"Paper Boat" (纸船) (with Yisa Yu)	2020	5	—	Extraterrestrial
"Extraterrestrial" (天外来物)	2020	4	—	Extraterrestrial
"Not Love Me" (不爱我)	2020	4	—	Extraterrestrial
"Small Sharp Point" (小尖尖) (with Han Hong)	2020	11	—	Extraterrestrial
"Lottery Ticket" (彩券)	2020	4	—	Extraterrestrial
"Exhausted" (耗尽) (with Guo Chongming)	2020	2	1	Extraterrestrial
"Ambition" (野心)	2020	13	—	Extraterrestrial
"Criminal Record" (把你揉碎捏成苹果)	2020	9	—	Extraterrestrial
"Tardy" (迟迟)	2020	14	—	Extraterrestrial
"Pan Jinlian" (潘金莲)	2020	67	—	Extraterrestrial
"Facade" (被人)	2021	3	—	Countless
"Turn Waste Into Treasure" (变废为宝)	2021	5	—	Countless
"Phoenix Feathers and Unicorn Horns" (凤毛麟角)	2021	8	—	Countless
"City of Luo" (洛城)	2021	11	—	Countless
"Supporting Role" (男二号)	2022	3	—	Countless
"But" (可) (with Jane Zhang)	2022	1	—	Countless
"About You" (关于你)	2022	8	—	Countless
"You Are Not Alone" (你不是一个人) (with Jeff Chang)	2022	5	—	Countless
"Countless" (无数)	2022	2	—	Countless
"Youth of Galaxy" (银河少年) (with Essay Wang)	2023	9	—	The Guardian
"Nothing"	2023	12	—	The Guardian
"Adoration" (崇拜)	2023	3	—	The Guardian
"Conviction" (念)	2023	3	—	The Guardian
"Love Letter" (情书)	2023	12	—	The Guardian
"AI"	2024	4	—	The Guardian
"The Guardian" (守村人)	2024	5	—	The Guardian
"Relieve Boredom" (解解闷)	2024	14	—	The Guardian
"That Day On the Road of No Return" (在那天回不去的路上)^{*}	2024	7	—	The Guardian
"Rent or Purchase" (租购)^{*}	2024	19	—	The Guardian
"Leap" (跃)	2025	3	—	—
"The Axe Trick" (金斧子银斧子)	2025	15	—	—
"Farewell My Concubine" (霸王別姬)^{*} (with Jane Zhang)	2025	18	—	—
"Lake" (湖泊)^{*}	2026	12	—	—
"Stubborn Illness" (顽疾)^{*}	2026	4	—	—
"Flip-Flops" (人字拖)^{*}	2026	5	—	—
"Sycophant" (媚人)	2026	—	—	—

^*: Live version previously performed on and released via Melody Journey..

== Soundtrack appearances ==
Title	Year	Television series/film	Ref.
"God of Business Fan Li" (商圣范蠡)	2009	God of Business Fan Li (商圣范蠡)	
"Unfinished Songs" (未完成的歌)	2011	Love Colors (爱缤纷)	
"Love's Expiration Date" (爱的期限)	2011	Love Colors (爱缤纷)	
"I Know That You Know" (我知道你都知道)	2012	The Queen of SOP (胜女的代价)	
"Several of You" (几个你)	2012	The Queen of SOP (胜女的代价)	
"Radius Around You" (方圆几里)	2013	The Most Familiar Stranger (最熟悉的陌生人)	
"Ugly" (丑八怪)	2014	Only If I Love You (如果我爱你)	
"An Unexpected Journey" (意外)	2014	Only If I Love You (如果我爱你)	
"What Do You Want From Me" (你还要我怎样)	2014	Only If I Love You (如果我爱你)	
"Serious Snow" (认真的雪)	2015	Mother Like Flowers (妈妈像花儿一样)	
"What Do You Want From Me" (你还要我怎样)	2015	Mother Like Flowers (妈妈像花儿一样)	
"Actually" (其实)	2015	Mother Like Flowers (妈妈像花儿一样)	
"Radius Around You" (方圆几里)	2015	Mother Like Flowers (妈妈像花儿一样)	
"Thousands of Words" (千言万语)	2015	Mother Like Flowers (妈妈像花儿一样)	
"As Long As We Have Loved" (我们爱过就好)	2016	Music World (音乐江湖)	
"Beginner" (初学者)	2016	A Test of Love Adventure (A测试之爱情大冒险)	
"I Think I've Seen You Somewhere" (我好像在哪见过你)	2016	Throne of Elves (精灵王座)	
"Gentleman" (绅士)	2016	Yes! Mr. Fashion (是！尚先生)	
"It's Raining" (下雨了)	2016	Still Lala (我是杜拉拉)	
"Seventeen Again" (重返十七岁)	2016	Back to School (我去上学啦)	
"Sing, Now" (歌唱吧, Now)	2016	Let's Sing Kids (中国新声代)	
"There Is Ample Time" (来日方长) (with Isabelle Huang)	2016	I Am Not Madame Bovary (我不是潘金莲)	
"Just Right" (刚刚好)	2017	Long for You (我与你的光年距离)	
"Just Right" (刚刚好)	2017	Double Sweet Wife (总裁误宠替身甜妻)	
"Gentleman" (绅士)	2017	Memory Cleaner (记忆清除者)	
"I'm Afraid" (我害怕)	2017	Boy Hood (我们的少年时代)	
"Fox" (狐狸)	2017	Hanson and the Beast (二代妖精之今生有幸)	
"Forsaken Youth" (违背的青春)	2018	To the Hard-working Youth (致不易青年)	
"Actor" (演员)	2019	River Flows to You (流淌的美好时光)	
"Like the Wind" (像风一样)	2019	I Will Never Let You Go (小女花不弃)	
"Paper Boat" (纸船)	2020	Legend of Awakening (天醒之路)	
"It's Been So Long" (这么久没见)	2021	Hello Prosecutor (你好检察官)	
"Ambition" (野心)	2021	The Soul (缉魂)	
"Facade" (被人)	2021	Falling into Your Smile (你微笑时很美)	
"Like the Wind" (像风一样)	2023	Behind the Blue Eyes (不能流泪的悲伤)	

== Music videos ==
Music videos below are uploaded to Xue's YouTube channel unless otherwise specified.

Song	Album
Serious Snow 认真的雪	Jacky
Yellow Maple Leaves 黄色枫叶	Jacky
Once Upon a Time in Zurich 苏黎世的从前	How Are You?
Love's Expiration Date 爱的期限	How Are You?
How Are You 你过得好吗	How Are You?
Love Verdict 爱情宣判	How Are You?
Deeply Loved You (Past Life) 深深愛過你 (前世)	Deeply Loved You
Deeply Loved You (Present Life) 深深愛過你 (今生)	Deeply Loved You
Legend 传说	Deeply Loved You
My Athena 我的雅典娜	Unfinished Songs
Unfinished Songs 未完成的歌	Unfinished Songs
Several of You 几个你	Several Of...
Foreshadowing 伏笔	Several Of...
I Know That You Know 我知道你都知道	Several Of...
I Finally Became Someone Else's Woman 我终于成了别人的女人	Several Of...
Radius Around You 方圆几里	An Unexpected Journey
Ugly 丑八怪	An Unexpected Journey
An Unexpected Journey 意外	An Unexpected Journey
What Do You Want From Me 你还要我怎样	An Unexpected Journey
Is There 有没有	An Unexpected Journey
Actually 其实	An Unexpected Journey
Gentleman 绅士	Beginner
Actor 演员	Beginner
It's Raining 下雨了	Beginner
小孩	Beginner
Half 一半	Beginner
Stay Here	Beginner
Beginner 初学者	Beginner
Just Right 刚刚好	Beginner
I Think I've Seen You Somewhere 我好像在哪见过你	Beginner
The Martian Has Come 火星人来过 Theme song for the variety show Mars Intelligence Agency	The Crossing
Noble 高尚	The Crossing
Animal World 动物世界	The Crossing
I'm Afraid 我害怕	The Crossing
Ambiguous 暧昧	The Crossing
Don't 别	The Crossing
Camel 骆驼	The Crossing
The Crossing 渡	The Crossing
Like the Wind 像风一样	The Crossing
Skyscraper 摩天大楼	Freak
Freak 怪咖	Freak
Forsaken Youth 违背的青春	Freak
The Best 最好	Freak
Reckless 肆无忌惮	Freak
Life After You Left Beijing 那是你离开北京的生活	Freak
Talent 天份	Freak
Fox 狐狸 Promotional song for the film Hanson and the Beast	Freak
Puppet 木偶人	Dust
Half a Beat Slower 慢半拍	Dust
It's Been So Long 这么久没见	Dust
Mocking 笑场	Dust
Morbid State 病态	Dust
Dust 尘	Dust
Express Your Feelings 聊表心意	Dust
Accompany You to Wander 陪你去流浪	Dust
Extraterrestrial 天外来物	Extraterrestrial
Ambition 野心 Promotional song for the film The Soul	Extraterrestrial
Lottery Ticket 彩券	Extraterrestrial
Criminal Record 把你揉碎捏成苹果	Extraterrestrial
Not Love Me 不爱我	Extraterrestrial
Facade 被人	Extraterrestrial
Tardy 迟迟	Extraterrestrial
Exhausted 耗尽	Extraterrestrial
Small Sharp Point 小尖尖 Uploaded to QQ Music	Extraterrestrial
Countless 无数	Countless
Phoenix Feathers and Unicorn Horns 凤毛麟角	Countless
Turn Waste Into Treasure 变废为宝	Countless
You Are Not Alone 你不是一个人	Countless
But 可	Countless
City of Luo 洛城	Countless
Supporting Role 男二號	Countless
Relieve Boredom 解解闷 Theme song of mobile game QQ Speed, uploaded to QQ Speed's Bilibili channel	The Guardian
Nothing	The Guardian
Rent or Purchase 租購	The Guardian
That Day On the Road of No Return 在那天回不去的路上	The Guardian
The Guardian 守村人	The Guardian
Conviction 念	The Guardian
Adoration 崇拜	The Guardian
Love Letter 情書	The Guardian
AI	The Guardian
Leap 跃	—
Farewell My Concubine 霸王別姬	—
Stubborn Illness 顽疾	—
Flip-Flops 人字拖	—

== Covers ==
Title	Year	Original singer	Stage	Note
"Lying" (说谎)	2017	Yoga Lin	Super Music	—
"How Could I Forget You?" (忘记你我做不到)	2017	Jacky Cheung	Super Music	—
"Wedding Blessing" (婚礼的祝福)	2017	Eason Chan	Mask Singer (Chinese TV series)	With Liu Wei
"Regret" (遗憾)	2017	Mavis Hee	Mask Singer (Chinese TV series)	—
"Superstar" (天后)	2017	Andrew Tan	Mask Singer (Chinese TV series)	—
"A Little Happiness" (小幸运)	2017	Hebe Tien	Asian Music Gala	With Tien
"Relieve Sorrow" (消愁)	2017	Mao Buyi	Jiangsu Satellite TV New Year's Eve Concert	With Mao
"Prince and Princess" (王子公主)	2017	Jeff Chang	Golden Melody (金曲捞)	—
"The Mute" (哑巴)	2018	Liu Wei	Infinite Song Season (无限歌谣季)	Included in the album "Freak" (怪咖)
"Love Movie" (爱情电影)	2018	Valen Hsu	Golden Melody 2 (金曲捞之挑战主打歌)	With Yisa Yu, Valen Hsu, and Zhang Yuan
"One Man Show" (独角戏)	2018	Valen Hsu	Golden Melody 2 (金曲捞之挑战主打歌)	—
"Last Night's Stars" (昨夜星辰)	2018	Lin Shu Rong	Golden Melody 2 (金曲捞之挑战主打歌)	With Yisa Yu, Tracy Wang, Silence Wang
"Because of Love" 因为爱情	2018	Faye Wong & Eason Chan	Here We Sing (嗨！唱起来)	With Dan Jingni
"River South" 江南	2018	JJ Lin	Here We Sing (嗨！唱起来)	With Don Chu
"She Came to My Concert" 她来听我的演唱会	2018	Jacky Cheung	Here We Sing (嗨！唱起来)	With Liu Danmeng, Dan Jingni, Don Chu
"Dalabengba" (达拉崩吧)	2018	Luo Tianyi	Jiangsu Satellite TV New Year's Eve Concert	Performed with Luo Tianyi
"Wakening" (梦醒了)	2021	Na Ying	Our Song – 2nd Season New Year Special	With GAI
"Dream Chaser" (追梦人)	2021	Fong Fei-fei	Our Song – 3rd Season	With Eric Chou
"Conquer" (征服)	2021	Na Ying	Our Song – 3rd Season	With Hammer Na Lisa
"Wait Until Flowers Wither" (我等到花儿也谢了)	2021	Jacky Cheung	Our Song – 3rd Season	With Hammer Na Lisa
"Dare to Love" (敢爱敢做)	2021	George Lam	Our Song – 3rd Season	With George Lam, Hu Xia, Hammer Na Lisa
"Late at Night" (夜深了)	2021	Second Hand Rose	Our Song – 3rd Season	With Hu Xia
"Matchstick Heaven" (火柴天堂)	2021	Chyi Chin	Our Song – 3rd Season	With Hammer Na Lisa
"Loess Plateau" (黄土高坡)	2021	An Wen	Jiangsu Satellite TV New Year's Eve Concert	—
"Crazy Love" (爱疯了)	2022	Penny Tai	Our Song – 3rd Season New Year Special	With Tai
"Warrior of the Darkness" (孤勇者)	2022	Eason Chan	Jiangsu Satellite TV New Year's Eve Concert	With Jace Guo
"You Make Me Happy and Sad" 让我欢喜让我忧	2023	Wakin Chau	Sing! China	—

== Compositions for other artists ==
Title	Year	Artist	Lyrics	Composition
"Light" (第二道光)	2021	Shine! Super Brothers contestants	Joker Xue	Joker Xue
"Dirty" (脏)	2023	Chen Bing	Joker Xue	Joker Xue
"Hide Me Away" (藏起我)	2023	Liu Wei	Joker Xue	Joker Xue and Wang Yuankun
"Always Will" (总会)	2023	Liu Xijun	Joker Xue and Pei Zhisen	Joker Xue
"Hobby" (爱好) (Melody Journey Episode 2)	2024	Chen Linong	Joker Xue	Joker Xue
"Hobby" (爱好) (Melody Journey Episode 2)	2024	Xiao Ke	Joker Xue	Joker Xue
"Wasp" (蜂) (Melody Journey Episode 7)	2024	Zhou Shen	Jace Guo and Joker Xue	James Lee
"Farewell My Concubine" (霸王别姬) (Melody Journey Episode 9)	2024	Yao Xiaotang & Liu Duan Duan	Joker Xue	Joker Xue
"More and More" (越来越) (Melody Journey Episode 10)	2024	Liu Xijun	Joker Xue	Joker Xue
"Mermaid Diamond" (粉钻)	2024	Stephy Qi	Joker Xue	Joker Xue
