= Joker Xue filmography =

Actor filmography

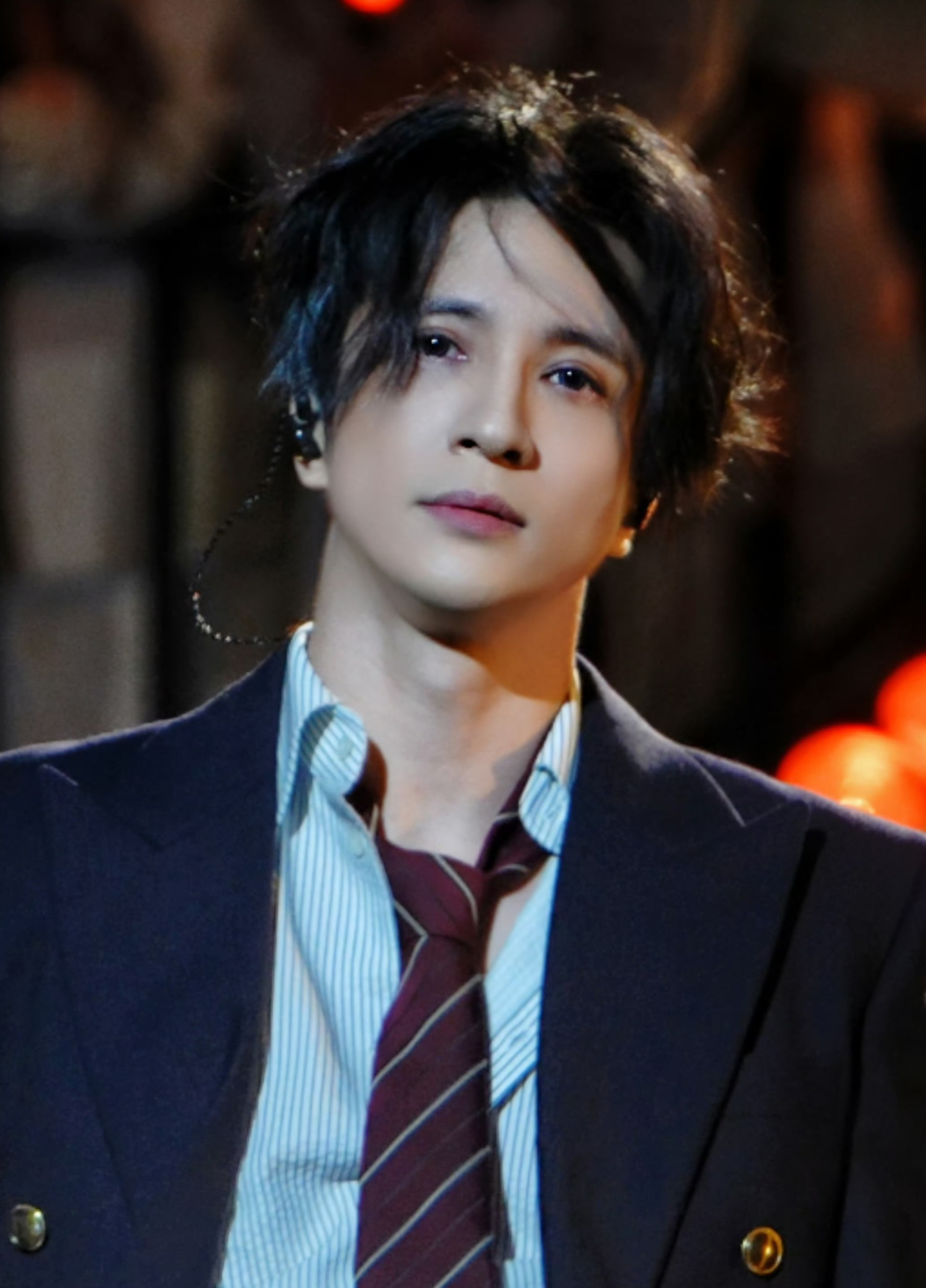
- Xue in June 2025, Bilibili Forever 22 Graduation Concert
- Feature films: 5
- Micro films: 9
- Television: 11

This article contains the filmography of Chinese singer-songwriter Joker Xue. Xue has starred in five feature films, eleven television shows, and nine micro movies. In addition, Xue has appeared on numerous variety shows, more than 40 in 2016 alone. Due to overall high volume and the infrequency of some of his appearances, only variety shows where he had a main or recurring role are included in the list below.

== Feature films ==
Year	Title	Role	Notes	Ref.
2010	The University Days of a Dog (一只狗的大学时光)	Qi Jun (齐俊)		
2011	East Meets West (东成西就2011)	Doctor (医生)		
2016	Music Arena (音乐江湖)	Chen Hao (陈浩)	Contributed "As Long As We Have Loved" to the soundtrack	
2017	What a Day! (有完没完)	Peace (和平)		
2019	A Test of Love Adventure (A测试之爱情大冒险)	Wang Xiaocong (王小聪)	Contributed "Beginner" to the soundtrack	

== Micro movies ==
Year	Title	Role	Notes	Ref.
2011	Love Colors (爱缤纷)	Wang Haozhe (王浩哲)	Contributed "Unfinished Songs" and "Love's Expiration Date" to the soundtrack	
2013	The Most Familiar Stranger (最熟悉的陌生人)	Yang Xi (杨曦)	Contributed "Radius Around You" to the soundtrack	
2016	Dark Fairy Tale: Cinderella (黑童话: 灰姑娘)	The Prince (王子)		
2017	Amnesiac (记忆清除者)	Joker Xue (薛之谦)	Contributed "Gentleman" to the soundtrack	
2017	Energetic Xue Zhiqian (机情四摄薛之谦)	Joker Xue (薛之谦)		
2017	2017 Goodbye Wonders (2017再见美好)	Lanmei (蓝莓)		
2018	Three Strikes on the Road (三打干道夫)	Xue Youxia (薛游侠)		
2018	Buddhist Player (佛系玩家)	Sanzang (三藏)	Also served as director and writer	
2019	Mung Bean Man (绿豆侠)	Mung Bean Man (绿豆侠)	Also served as director	

== Television shows ==
Year	Title	Role	Notes	Ref.
2003	Life Concern (人命关天)	Ma Xiaoneng (马小能)		
2004	Romantic Crystal Love (水晶之恋)	Jacky		
2005	The 100th Bride (第100个新娘)	Li Liang (李亮)		
2005	Loving You Is Not Easy (爱你不容易)	Luo Dazhuang (罗大壮)		
2005	Spicy Hot Teacher (麻辣教师)	Lennon (列侬)		
2006	Uncle: That Guy is Handsome (老娘舅之那小子真帅)	Han Liu (韩柳)		
2009	Go! The Prince of Tennis (加油! 网球王子)	Ren Ruocheng (任若成)		
2012	The Queen of SOP (胜女的代价)	Xue Shaoqian (薛少谦)	Contributed "I Know That You Know" and "Several of You" to the soundtrack	
2015	Mother Like Flowers] (妈妈像花儿一样)	Zhang Laifu (张来福)	Contributed "Serious Snow", "What Do You Want From Me", "Actually", "Radius Around You" to and covered "Thousands of Words" on the soundtrack	
2015	Men's Gang: Friends (男人帮·朋友)	Gao Yi (高益)	Not yet aired	
2017	Boyhood (我们的少年时代)	Tao Xi 陶西	Contributed "I'm Afraid" to the soundtrack	

== Variety shows ==
Year	Title	Role	Notes	Ref.
2005	My Style, My Show (我型我秀)	Contestant	Finished in 2nd place, debuted as singer-songwriter	
2011	Magic Mall (魔力之城)	Host		
2016	Hidden Singer (誰是大歌神)	Panel member		
2016	I Can See Your Voice (看見你的聲音)	Host		
2016	Mars Intelligence Agency, Season 1 (火星情報局, 第一季)	Main cast (as "Senior Agent")		
2016	College Students Are Coming (大學生來了)	Host		
2016	Challenger's Alliance, Season 2 (挑戰者聯盟, 第二季)	Main cast		
2016	The Collaboration (作戰吧偶像)	Collaborator Contestant		
2016	Let's Sing Kids, Season 4 (中国新声代, 第四季)	Coach		
2016	Back to School, Season 2 (我去上學啦, 第二季)	Main cast		
2016	Mars Intelligence Agency, Season 2 (火星情報局, 第二季)	Main Cast (as "Senior Agent")		
2016	Our Challenge (我們的挑戰)	Main cast		
2017	Golden Melody (金曲捞)	Panel member Performer		
2017	The Coming One, Season 1 (明日之子, 第一季)	Coach		
2017	Mars Intelligence Agency, Season 3 (火星情報局, 第三季)	Main cast (as "Deputy Director")		
2018	Infinite Song Season (無限歌謠季)	Mentor Collaborator	Covered "The Mute" by Silence Wang Composed, wrote, and performed "Wake Up (Live)", "Freak", and "Express Your Feelings" Composed and wrote "Talent" All songs were included on his 9th studio album Freak except for "Express Your Feelings" which was included on his 10th studio album Dust	
2018	Crossover Singer, Season 3 (跨界歌王, 第三季)	Judge		
2018	Golden Melody 2 (金曲捞之挑战主打歌)	Host Performer		
2018	Mars Intelligence Agency, Season 4 (火星情報局, 第四季)	Main cast (as "Deputy Director")		
2020	Mars Intelligence Agency, Season 5 (火星情報局, 第五季)	Main cast (as "Deputy Director")		
2020	Wonder Agency (神奇公司在哪裏)	Main cast (as "Business Director"		
2021	The Next Banger (我的音樂你聽嗎)	Mentor Collaborator		
2021	Singing with Legends 3 (我们的歌, 第三季)	Mentor Collaborator Contestant		
2021	In China (中国潮音)	Judge Mentor		
2023	Sing! China, Season 8 (2023中国好声音)	Judge Coach	Program suspended indefinitely	
2023	Mars Intelligence Agency, Season 6 (火星情報局, 第六季)	Main cast (as "Deputy Director")		
2024	Run! Live Performance for Ten Thousand People (奔赴! 万人现场)	Mentor		
2024	Melody Journey (音乐缘计划)	Singer Songwriter	Formerly named Music Wave Project	
2024	Mars Intelligence Agency, Season 7 (火星情報局, 第七季)	Main cast (as "Director")		
2025	Crush of Music (音乐缘计划II)	Singer	Melody Journey was renamed Crush of Music for season 2	
2025	Chinese Singer (中国唱将)	Faculty		
