= Long Long =

Chinese operatic tenor

- 张龙
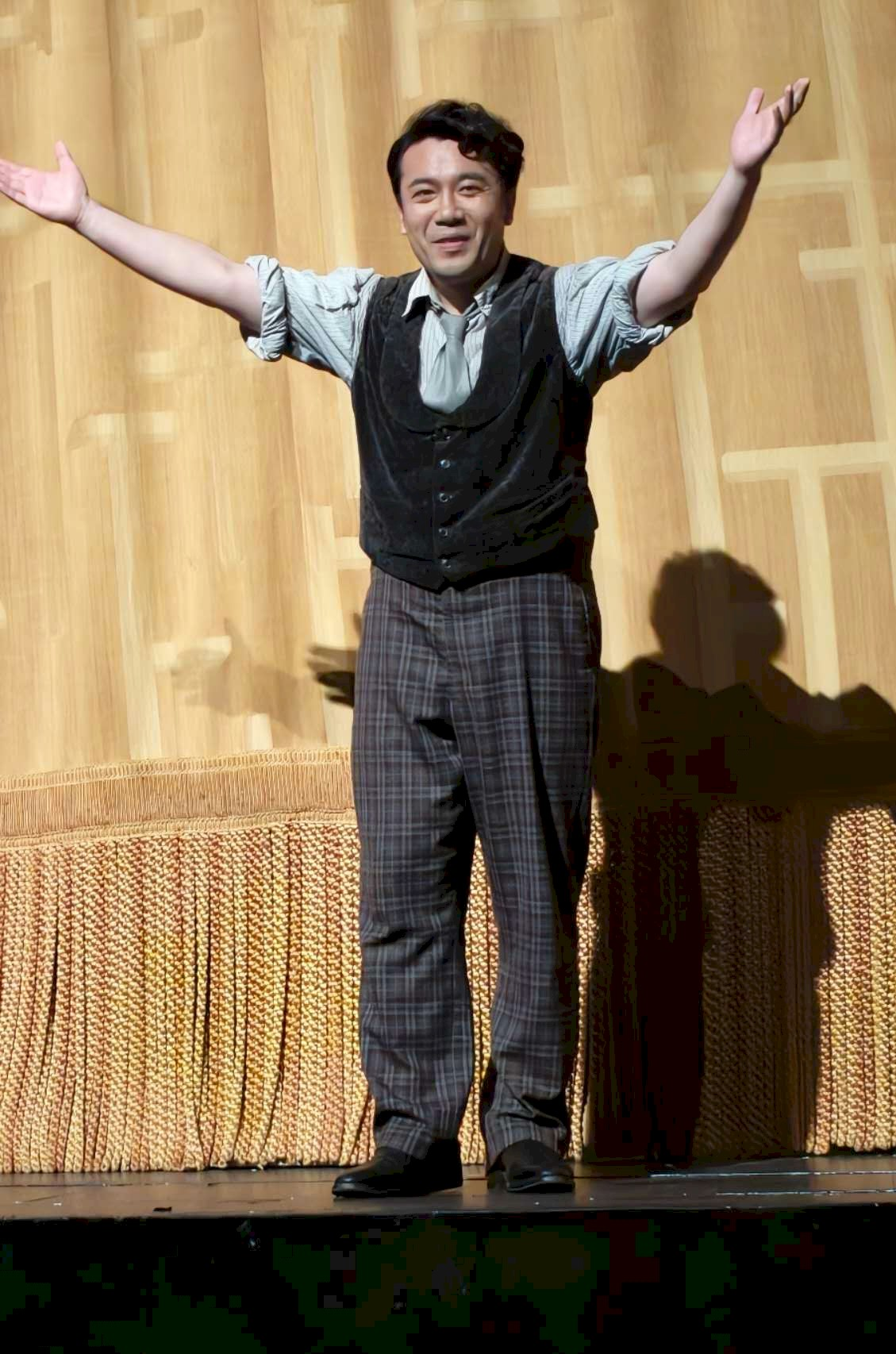
- Long Long Tenor
- Born: 1991 (age 34–35); Jinan, Shandong, China
- Education: Shanghai Conservatory of Music; Academy of Opera, Peking University, Hochschule für Musik, Theater und Medien Hannover
- Occupation: Opera Singer (tenor)
- Years active: 2015–present
- Known for: Winner of the Neue Stimmen Competition (2019) and performances at Metropolitan Opera and Royal Opera House
- Website: longlongtenor.com

Long Long (Chinese: 张龙; born in Jinan, Shandong) is a Chinese operatic lyric tenor. He has performed leading roles at international opera houses and festivals, including Metropolitan Opera, Royal Opera House, Staatsoper Berlin, Deutsche Oper Berlin, Bayerische Staatsoper, Canadian Opera Company, Hamburg State Opera, as well as Bregenzer Festspiele, Salzburg Festival, Tiroler Festspiele, and the Glyndebourne Festival.

== Early life and education ==
Born in Jinan, Shandong in 1991, Long Long represents the fourth generation of a Chinese opera family with a nearly century-long performing tradition. Raised backstage and immersed in theatrical environments from childhood, he developed an early affinity for vocal music that would shape his later career as a classical tenor.

Long Long received his vocal training at conservatories in China and Europe. He graduated from the Shanghai Conservatory of Music in 2015, where he studied with Professor Chen Xing, and subsequently completed a master's degree at the Academy of Opera, Peking University under the tenor Dai Yuqiang. He joined the Bayerische Staatsoper Opera Studio as a resident member from 2017 to 2019 and received significant vocal training under John Norris. In 2023 he completed a Soloklasse at the Hochschule für Musik, Theater und Medien Hannover in Germany, where he studied with Professor Marek Rzepka.

== Career ==
=== Repertoire ===
Long Long's repertoire spans Italian bel canto, the major Puccini and Verdi tenors, French lyric roles and Mozart. His signature roles include Rodolfo in La bohème, Alfredo Germont in La traviata, Il Duca di Mantova in Rigoletto, Cavaradossi in Tosca, Cassio in Otello, Edgardo in Lucia di Lammermoor, Nemorino in L'elisir d'amore, Don José in Carmen, Nadir in Les pêcheurs de perles, the title role of Faust, Roméo in Roméo et Juliette, Tamino in Die Zauberflöte, Don Ottavio in Don Giovanni, and Gérald in Lakmé.

=== Performances ===
Long Long was a member of the ensemble of the Hannover State Opera from 2019 to 2021. During his time with the company, he performed leading roles in L'elisir d'amore, La bohème, as Don Ottavio in Don Giovanni, and as the Duke in Rigoletto.

In 2021, he performed Il Duca di Mantova in Rigoletto at Bregenz Festival and Göteborg Opera, Don Ottavio in Don Giovanni at Dutch National Opera & Ballet, and Tamino in Die Zauberflöte at Komische Oper Berlin.

He made his Glyndebourne Festival debut in 2022 as Rodolfo in a new production of La bohème. The same year he sang Il Duca di Mantova in Rigoletto in Gothenburg and Alfredo Germont in La traviata at the Ópera Nacional de Chile.

In December 2022 he sang Tamino in Die Zauberflöte at the Royal Opera House in London. In 2023 he appeared as Rodolfo in La bohème at the Hamburg State Opera and the Semperoper Dresden, as Il Duca di Mantova in Rigoletto at the Prague National Theatre, Oper Frankfurt and the Bucharest National Opera, and as Gérald in Lakmé at the NCPA Beijing.

In 2024 he made his Canadian Opera Company debut in the title role of Gounod's Faust Earlier the same year he sang Roméo at the Dallas Opera, a debut for which he received the company's Maria Callas Debut Artist of the Year Award. He also performed Alfredo Germont at the Deutsche Oper am Rhein, Edgardo in Lucia di Lammermoor at the Deutsche Oper Berlin, and stepped in as Rodolfo in La bohème at the Tyrolean Festival in Erl under Jonas Kaufmann's inaugural season as artistic director Also in 2024, he gave a homecoming performance as Don José in Carmen at the Shanghai Conservatory of Music Opera House.

In 2025 he appeared as Roméo at the Staatsoper Berlin, sang Cassio in Otello at the Bayerische Staatsoper, reprised Alfredo Germont with the Atlanta Opera, and made his Santa Fe Opera debut as Rodolfo in La bohème In February 2026 Long Long sang Nadir in Les pêcheurs de perles at the Palm Beach Opera.

In April 2026 Long Long made his Metropolitan Opera debut as Rodolfo in La bohème. Subsequent engagements include a return to the Bregenzer Festspiele as Alfredo Germont in La traviata (summer 2026), Alfredo with the Canadian Opera Company (autumn 2026), Don José in Carmen at the Shanghai Grand Theatre (November 2026), and further runs as Rodolfo at the Royal Danish Opera in Copenhagen, the Theater Bonn, Seattle Opera, and the Zürich Opera House.

=== Concerts, recitals and features ===
Long Long has appeared in recital at concert venues including the Beijing Concert Hall, the Wuhan Qintai Concert Hall, Singapore's Victoria Concert Hall and the Chengdu City Concert Hall. In 2021 he recorded a debut tenor aria album with the Polish National Radio Symphony Orchestra, performing a solo recital at the orchestra's concert hall. In October 2020 he was featured as the cover artist of the German opera magazine Das Opernglas.

== Awards ==
- 2024 — Maria Callas Debut Artist of the Year, Dallas_Opera
- 2024 — Top 10 Opera Rising Stars, OperaWire
- 2019 — First Prize, Neue Stimmen International Singing Competition
- 2017 — First Prize, Vocal Category, 2nd Harbin International Music Competition
- 2017 — Third Prize and Moniuszko Special Prize, 10th Moniuszko International Vocal Competition (Poland)
- 2017 — Third Prize, Francisco Viñas International Singing Competition (Barcelona)
- 2017 — Co-First Prize, 55th International Verdi Singing Competition (Busseto)
- 2017 — Top 10 Young Singers, The Opera Awards (London, nominee)
- 2016 — First Prize, Bucharest National Opera Singing Competition (Le Grand Prix de l'Opéra)
