= Wei Song =

Chinese operatic tenor (born 1955)

Wei Song (魏松; born 1955) is a Chinese operatic tenor.

With Dai Yuqiang and Hong Kong born Warren Mok he has performed abroad as "China's Three Tenors." He studied with Zhou Xiaoyan at the Shanghai Conservatory of Music.

== Discography ==
- Miracle (奇迹 qíjì) CD 2011 - Chinese standards such as Molihua (茉莉花)

Video:

- Zan Yuen DVD
- China's Three Tenors DVD
