= Dai Yuqiang =

Chinese operatic tenor

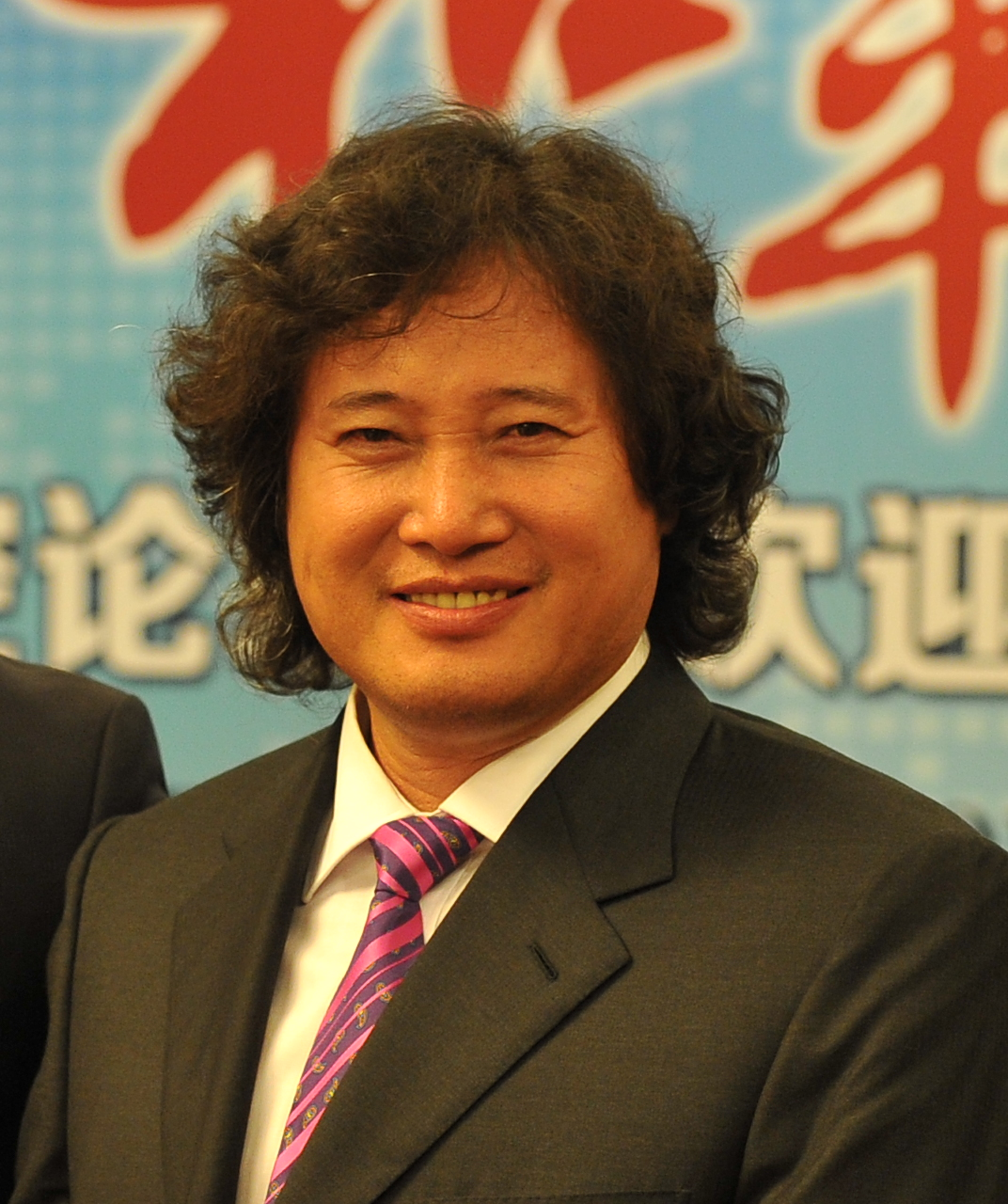
- Dai Yuqiang in 2013
- Born: 12 March 1963 (age 62); Langfang Wenan, Hebei, China
- Occupation: Opera singer

Chinese name
- Traditional Chinese: 戴玉強
- Simplified Chinese: 戴玉强
Transcriptions
Standard Mandarin
- Hanyu Pinyin: Dài Yùqiáng

Dai Yuqiang (Chinese: 戴玉强; March 12, 1963) is a Chinese operatic tenor. He was the first and only Chinese student of Luciano Pavarotti. With Wei Song and Warren Mok he has performed abroad as "China's Three Tenors."

== Discography ==
- Opera arias, EMI
- Zuguo qing (祖国情, Patriotic Emotion), 2010
