= Half (EP) =

EP by Joker Xue
- Released: October 17, 2015
- Recorded: 2015
- Genre: Mandopop
- Length: 15:08
- Label: Ocean Butterflies; Chaoshi Music
- Producer: Joker Xue

Joker Xue chronology
Gentleman (2015)	Half (2015)	Beginner (2016)

Half (Chinese: 一半) is the second extended play by Chinese singer-songwriter Joker Xue. It was released on October 17, 2015, by Ocean Butterflies and later acquired by Xue's own label Chaoshi Music.

== Background ==
Half is the second of the two EPs Xue said he would release prior to the full album in a bid to make sure every song has a chance to be heard by the audience because most songs on a full album are often ignored for the lead single. Xue again served as the producer on the album, collaborating with Guo Ding, Li Ronghao and Peter Krafft on the songs.

"Child" is written and composed by Guo, who has previously worked with Xue. Xue liked the song as soon as he heard the demo because the message that people who are too rational and calculating in love wishing to regain the "innocent heart of a child" resonated with him.

Li composed "Half" in 2010, Xue had liked the song as soon as he heard it but did not acquire it until 2015; after acquiring it, he spent a week writing the lyrics for the song and he considered "Half" the best set of lyrics he had written in the past few years. It details a breakup of a couple where "half of you has become my fetter, and half of me has become your obstacle."

"Stay Here", composed by Kraff, was originally intended to be an English song but Xue thought it was so good that he could not resist writing the Chinese lyrics for it, creating a song that memorializes his stubbornness with the hope that in the future, he would not make the same mistake again.

== Reception ==
Xue continued to showcase his unique "Xue Style Love Song" and maturity in his music through his second EP, finally letting go of the emotional pain of the past and presenting it in his songs through different emotions such as determination, sadness, nostalgia, regret, tenderness, and pain. When the listener heard Xue's songs, they could not help but be touched by the story in his music.

Half won the top spot on many music charts since its release. On November 10, Ocean Butterflies held celebration in Beijing in honor of Half surpassing 100 million listening volume, achieved in less than a month.

== Track listing ==
Track listing for Half
No.	Title	Lyrics	Music	Length
1.	"Half (一半)"	Joker Xue	Li Ronghao	4:46
2.	"Child (小孩)"	Guo Ding	Guo Ding	5:21
3.	"Stay Here"	Joker Xue	Peter Krafft	5:01
Total length:				15:08
