= Gentleman (EP) =

EP by Joker Xue
- Released: June 5, 2015
- Recorded: 2015
- Genre: Mandopop
- Length: 14:16
- Labels: Ocean Butterflies; Chaoshi Music
- Producer: Joker Xue

Joker Xue chronology
An Unexpected Journey (2013)	Gentleman (2015)	Half (2015)

Gentleman (Chinese: 绅士) is the first extended play by Chinese singer-songwriter Joker Xue. It was released on June 5, 2015, by Ocean Butterflies and later acquired by Xue's own label Chaoshi Music.

== Background ==
It took Xue nineteen months to complete The Gentleman while traveling between Beijing, Shanghai, and Taipei. He chose the EP format because he felt that, often, when a full album is released, people only listen to songs that were released as singles and ignore the rest of the album. A lot of hard work went into creating an album and he'd like each song to be heard, so the plan, Xue shared, to release three songs first, then three more, and finally the entire album. He advised against buying the album as it only contained three songs and not a good value proposition. He recommended listening to it for free online first and purchasing the full album but only if you liked the songs.

Gentleman contains three singles with music videos accompanying each song, which were written, composed, and produced by Xue himself. The inspiration for "Gentleman" is the choice between being lost lovers who have no contact with each other or maintaining a careful distance, with the conclusion that a gentleman of unrequited love is the most difficult role to play. "Actor" expresses the wish of "if you no longer love me, please express it openly" and outlines the roles one acts out as a relationship is near its end. "It's Raining" uses its melody and lyrics to create a melancholic atmosphere that portrays the "heavy downpour inside the hearts of those who have lost their loves".

== Reception ==
Gentleman not only ranked in the top spot on many Chinese music charts across streaming platforms, radio, and music shows but also received praise from critics. Xue's unique "Xue Style Love Song" sound is present throughout the EP, with his interpretation of heartbreak and longing expressed in a poetic way. His vocals were considered to have evolved from the lyrical R&B style in his early days, now richer and more layered.

"Actor", in particular, is Xue's best-known song both domestically and internationally, with more than 200 million views on YouTube, more than 100 million streams on Spotify and more than 27 million collection counts on QQ Music. It is considered Xue's signature song.

On Tencent Music's annual physical album sales chart, launched in 2021, Gentleman continued to appear on the chart, ranking 64th in 2023, 70th in 2024, and 64th in 2025.

== Track listing ==
Track listing for Gentleman
No.	Title	Lyrics	Music	Length
1.	"Gentleman (绅士)"	Joker Xue	Joker Xue	4:50
2.	"Actor (演员)"	Joker Xue	Joker Xue	4:21
3.	"It's Raining (下雨了)"	Joker Xue	Joker Xue	5:05
Total length:				14:16
