= Melody Journey =

Chinese reality television show

- Also known as: 音樂潮計劃
- Chinese: 音乐缘计划
- Genre: Variety Show
- Presented by: Li Hao
- Country of origin: China
- Original language: Mandarin Chinese
- No. of seasons: 3
- No. of episodes: 34

Production
- Producers: Jiang Fangming, Wu Han, Li Guanghan
- Production locations: Filming: Sifang Art Lake District, Nanjing; Performances: MGM Cotai, Macau
- Camera setup: Multicamera setup
- Running time: 150 minutes
- Production companies: Jiangsu Satellite TV iQiYi

Original release
- Network: Jiangsu Satellite TV iQiYi
- Release: 18 August 2024 – present

Melody Journey is an original Chinese reality show jointly produced by Jiangsu TV and iQiyi. The first episode aired simultaneously on both platforms on August 18, 2024. The program aims to match singers with songwriters in order to promote and showcase original songs.

On April 23, 2025, iQiyi announced that the second season has been ordered. The show's English title was changed to Crush of Music for future seasons.

== Show format ==
=== Basic premise ===
Each episode features 5-8 original songs by songwriters, who perform their demos to a group of singers. Singers, each with six CDs as tokens, then visit songwriters' rooms during the conversation stage to express their interest in the songs via giving the songwriters CDs. Singers may give more than one CD to indicate higher level of interest. Based on the CDs received, songwriters select the singer who best suits their song.

After matching, the singer works with the songwriter to finalize the song before the performance stage at MGM Cotai.

=== "Burst light" option ===
Singers can claim a song via the "burst light" option, adapted from the dating show If You Are the One. When the "burst light" time window is announced, singers race to the "burst light" podium and press the numbered light corresponding to the songwriter's room of the song they wish to claim. Each singer may only use this option once and each song can only be claimed once.

During the performance stage, both the matched version and the "burst light" version of the song are performed. In season 1, the audience votes between the two to determine if the "burst light" version has successfully challenged the matched version. If successful, both versions will be released on QQ Music and KuGou Music at the same time. If unsuccessful, the "burst light" version will be released 24 hours after the matched version. In season 2, the same rules apply except instead of the audience votes, the "burst light" version will be unlocked once it reach 100,000 music score on QQ Music and KuGou Music.

In season 1, variations of the "Burst light" option appeared in the following episodes:

- Episodes 3, 7, 9: Each singer may only use this option once and only two songs can be claimed.
- Episode 4: Up to four songs can be claimed, two during the demo stage and two during the regular time window.
- Episodes 5-6: Each singer only has one "burst light" chance in these episodes.
- Episodes 8: No "burst light" option available.
- Episodes 10: Only one "burst light" option available.

As of season 2 episode 6, the show has consistently followed the default rule for the "Burst light" option.

=== Possible outcome variations ===
Because of the "burst light option," there are several different possible outcomes for a song:

- Song is matched to a singer with no "burst light" claim; one performance stage.
- Song is matched to a singer with "burst light" claim by another singer; two performance stages, audience votes.
- Song is matched to a singer and claimed by same singer via "burst light"; one performance stage, no audience votes.
- Song is not matched to a singer and is only claimed via "burst light"; one performance stage, no audience votes.
- Song is not matched to a singer and is not claimed via "burst light"; no performance stage, considered a "passed" song.

=== Song with most potential ===
Each episode, Jiangsu TV's AIGC determines the song with the most potential based on current trends, listeners demographic, and genre of music.

=== Advantage/disadvantage cards ===
Beginning in season 2, singers play mini games where the winners gain advantage cards and loser receive disadvantage cards that activate during the conversation stage. Advantages include limiting two singers movement during the conversation phase by handcuffing them together, learning the songwriters' ideal match for their songs, and using the "burst light" at any time. Disadvantages include remaining silent for the first 15 minutes during the conversation stage, having fewer number of CDs to give to the songwriters, and having to roll the correct room number on a die before entering the songwriter's room.

== Cast ==
=== Season 1 ===
Main

- Joker Xue (Singer: Episodes 1, 3–4, 7–8, 11; Songwriter: Episodes 2, 9–10)
- Zhou Shen (Singer: Episodes 1–11)
- Shan Yichun (Singer: Episodes 1–11)
- Lars Huang (Singer: Episodes 1–11)
- Liu Duan Duan (Singer: Episodes 1–9, 11)

Recurring

- Jane Zhang (Singer: Episodes 1–4)
- Chen Linong (Singer: Episodes 1–4)
- Mooney (Singer: Episodes 3–4; Songwriter: Episodes 2, 8)
- Chen Zhuoxuan (Singer: Episodes 5–6, 11)
- Bibi Zhou (Singer: Episodes 7–11)
- Liu Yuning (Singer: Episodes 7–11)
- Lil Ghost (Singer: Episodes 7–11)

Guest

- Essay Wang (Singer: Episodes 1–2)
- Duan Aojuan (Singer: Episodes 1–2)
- Xiao Ke (Singer: Episodes 2; Songwriter: Episode 1)
- Meng Jia (Singer: Episodes 3–4)
- Li Jiage (Singer: Episodes 3–4)
- Kenji Wu (Singer: Episodes 5–6)
- Cai Guoqing (Singer: Episodes 5–6)
- Yuexin Wang (Singer: Episodes 5–6)
- Ayanga (Singer: Episodes 5–6)
- Liu Xijun (Singer: Episodes 9–10)
- Yao Xiaotang (Singer: Episodes 9–10)

=== Season 2 ===
Main

- Joker Xue (Singer: Episodes 1-11)
- Jane Zhang (Singer: Episodes 1-11)
- Zhou Shen (Singer: Episodes 1-11)
- Lars Huang (Singer: Episodes 1-11)
- Liu Yuning (Singer: Episodes 1-11)

Recurring

- Yisa Yu (Singer: Episodes 1-4, 11)
- Zhang Junhao (Singer: Episodes 1-4, 11)
- Ouyang Nana (Singer: Episodes 1-2, 5-8, 11)
- Wei Xiang (Singer: Episodes 1-2, 7-8)
- Yu Yan (Singer: Episodes 1-2, 7-8, 11)
- Curley G (Singer: Episodes 3-4, 9-10)
- Zhang Chi (Singer: Episodes 3-4, 9-11)
- Tan Jing (Singer: Episodes 5-6, 9-10)
- Li Angxing (Songwriter: Episodes 4, 9-10; Singer: Episode 11)
- Jiang Man (Songwriter: Episodes 3, 6-7, 10; Singer: Episode 11)

Guest

- Chen Zhuoxuan (Singer: Episodes 3-4)
- Liu Duan Duan (Singer: Episodes 5-6, 10)
- Robby Huang (Singer: Episodes 5-6)
- R.E.D (Singer: Episodes 5-6, 11)
- Jiang Dunhao (Singer: Episode 7-8)
- Yao Xiaotang (Singer: Episode 7-8)
- Essay Wang (Singer: Episode 9)
- Hou Minghao (Singer: Episode 9-10)
- Xiao Aqi (Singer: Episode 9-10)
- Bi Xiaoxin (Songwriter: Episode 7; Singer: Episode 11)
- Chen Xukan (Songwriter: Episode 8; Singer: Episode 11)
- Eric (Songwriter: Episode 8; Singer: Episode 11)
- Murphy Band (Songwriter: Episode 5; Singer: Episode 11)
- Yang Moyi (Songwriter: Episodes 1, 7; Singer: Episode 11)
- Dong Jiahong (Singer: Episode 11)
- Qiao Juncheng (Songwriter: Episodes 4, 10; Singer: Episode 11)
- Wang Zi (Songwriter: Episode 9; Singer: Episode 11)
- KAZE Zhan Yixuan (Songwriter: Episodes 2, 9; Singer: Episode 11)
- Chen Guanyu (Songwriter: Episode 1; Singer: Episode 11)

=== Season 3 ===
Main

- Joker Xue (Singer: Episodes 1- )
- Joey Yung (Singer: Episodes 1- )
- Zhou Shen (Singer: Episodes 1- )
- Lars Huang (Singer: Episodes 1- )
- Liu Yuning (Singer: Episodes 1- )

Recurring

Guest

- Curley G (Singer: Episode 1)
- Kelly Yu (Singer: Episode 1)
- Cai Wenjing (Singer: Episode 1)
- Ele Yan (Singer: Episode 1)
- Zhang Chi (Singer: Episode 1)
- Jiang Long (Singer: Episode 1)

== Episodes ==
=== Season 1 ===
Songs are listed in order of the room number each songwriter was in. For the End-of-Season Festival, which was a celebration of the season with collaborative performances of standout songs from various episodes, songs are listed in order of appearance.

Melody Journey: Season 1 Episode 1 (August 18)
Song	Songwriter(s)	Singer(s)	Notes	Ref.
Not Mentioning a Word (只字不提)	Bao Anquan	Joker Xue	Joker Xue was matched with the song but chose not perform it because he and Bao Anquan were unable to reach a consensus regarding lyrics.	
Not Mentioning a Word (只字不提)	Bao Anquan	Zhou Shen	Claimed via "burst light" option; no challenge.	
Catchphrase (口頭禪)	Yang Moyi	Jane Zhang	—	
DO U	Xiao Ma M.Refre$H	Lars Huang	—	
Silence of the Lamb (沉默的羔羊)	Yu Dongran	Zhou Shen	Song with most potential.	
My Last Lover (最後的愛人)	Xiao Ke	Essay Wang & Duan Aojuan	—	
Come, Go (來, 走)	Liu Lian	Liu Lian & Essay Wang	A duet stage because Liu Lian stated she was looking for someone to sing the song together.	
Melody Journey: Season 1 Episode 2 (August 25)
Song	Songwriter(s)	Singer(s)	Notes	Ref.
Sun Princess (太陽公主)	Wang Zi	Shan Yichun	—	
I Really Can't Leave You (真的離不開你)	Xu Huanliang	Lars Huang	—	
Nothing Left (没有了)	Mooney	Liu Duan Duan、Duan Aojuan	—	
Nothing Left (没有了)	Mooney	Chen Linong	Claimed via "burst light" option; challenge successful.	
In Between the Upside Down (顛倒之間)	Wu Hewen	Zhou Shen	Matched and claimed via "burst light" option. Song with most potential.	
Moonlight (月色)	Luan Yize	Lars Huang	—	
Hobby (愛好)	Joker Xue	Chen Linong	—	
Hobby (愛好)	Joker Xue	Xiao Ke	Claimed via "burst light" option; challenge successful.	
Melody Journey: Season 1 Episode 3 (September 1)
Song	Songwriter(s)	Singer(s)	Notes	Ref.
Asking Knowingly (明知故問)	Jace Guo	Jane Zhang & Shan Yichun	Songwriter and singers agreed on a duet instead of a solo stage. Song with most potential.	
Brain (腦)	Hu Mengzhou	Meng Jia	—	
Give It A Try (試試吧)	Chen Tongyan	Li Jiage & Mooney	Songwriter and singers agreed on a duet instead of a solo stage.	
Strive for Your Best (奮力一搏)	Huang Kuo-lun	Mooney	Claimed via "burst light" option. "Passed" song; only has "burst light" performance stage.	
Okay, No Problem, It's All Fine (好的, 沒關係, 都可以)	Guo Jiaqi	Lars Huang	—	
Wait for You (等你)	Chen Shengyu	Zhou Shen	—	
Wait for You (等你)	Chen Shengyu	Liu Duan Duan	Claimed via "burst light" option; challenge unsuccessful.	
Melody Journey: Season 1 Episode 4 (September 8)
Song	Songwriter(s)	Singer(s)	Notes	Ref.
Furnace (爐)	He Jiale	Li Jiage	—	
Let Me Go	Guan Haode	Shan Yichun	—	
Let Me Go	Guan Haode	Jane Zhang	Claimed via "burst light" option; challenge unsuccessful.	
Rent, Purchase (租購)	Dong Jiahong	Joker Xue	—	
Rent, Purchase (租購)	Dong Jiahong	Chen Linong	Claimed via "burst light" option; no challenge. Because Dong Jiahong wrote the song specifically for Joker Xue, he was the one to decide if the "burst light" version would be released online; he chose to have both versions released online.	
Whenver I (每當我)	Zhou Fujin	Lars Huang	—	
Only Related to Me (只與我有關聯)	Zhong Tianli	Zhou Shen	—	
Only Related to Me (只與我有關聯)	Zhong Tianli	Li Jiage	Claimed via "burst light" option; challenge unsuccessful.	
I Want to Forget You Right Now (我好想現在就把你忘了)	Zhong Wanyun	Jane Zhang	Song with most potential.	
I Want to Forget You Right Now (我好想現在就把你忘了)	Zhong Wanyun	Liu Duan Duan	Claimed via "burst light" option; challenge unsuccessful.	
Melody Journey: Season 1 Episode 5 (September 15)
Song	Songwriter(s)	Singer(s)	Notes	Ref.
Black Hole (黑洞)	Yi Zeyu	Liu Duan Duan & Chen Zhuoxuan	—	
Good Night, The One Knocking on My Door (晚安, 敲門者)	Wang Yaoyang	Lars Huang & Wang Yuexin	Song with most potential.	
I Don't Care How Absurd the World Is (我不在乎世界如何荒唐)	Cai Youqi	Ayunga	—	
The End of Flowers (花開盡頭)	Liu Fengyao	Kenji Wu	—	
Lifelong Loneliness (終身孤獨)	Ye Qing Sai Lan	Shan Yichun	—	
Melody Journey: Season 1 Episode 6 (September 22)
Song	Songwriter(s)	Singer(s)	Notes	Ref.
Forget Me (忘了我)	Jiang Haonan	Zhou Shen	—	
Forget Me (忘了我)	Jiang Haonan	Liu Duan Duan	Claimed via "burst light" option; challenge unsuccessful.	
My New World (我的新世界)	Xiao Huangqi	Liu Duan Duan & Xiao Huangqi & Tong Mengshi	Tong Mengshi appeared as a special guest for the performance stage.	
Mine	Qian Runyu	Zhou Shen & Qian Runyu	Song with most potential.	
Give My Last Tenderness to the Neighbor's Dog (把最後的溫柔給鄰居家的狗)	Li Zheng	Wang Yuexin	Matched and claimed via "burst light" option.	
The Cicadas' Chirping on the Eighth Day (八日蟬鳴)	Wei Luyao	Cai Guoqing & Ayunga	—	
The Cicadas' Chirping on the Eighth Day (八日蟬鳴)	Wei Luyao	Chen Zhuoxuan	Claimed via "burst light" option; challenge successful.	
Riddle (谜语)	Wang Jingwen	—	"Passed" song; no performance stage. While Wang Jingwen received CDs from Cai Guoqing and Ayunga, those were gestures of support and not interest in performing the song.	
Melody Journey: Season 1 Episode 7 (September 29)
Song	Songwriter(s)	Singer(s)	Notes	Ref.
Do You Dare? (你敢嗎)	Ding Yu	Liu Yuning	—	
Do You Dare? (你敢嗎)	Ding Yu	Liu Duan Duan	Claimed via "burst light" option; challenge successful.	
Against the Wind (逆風)	AI generated	—	"Passed" song; no performance stage.	
Wasp (蜂)	James Lee & Joker Xue & Jace Guo	Zhou Shen	Demo was titled Resist and in English; after a discussion about the low marketability of an all-English song, Jace Guo and Joker Xue rewrote the lyrics in Chinese.	
Don't Keep Feeling Crestfallen (你不要垂頭喪氣的)	Dong Jiahong	Joker Xue & Dong Jiahong	Claimed using the "burst light" option. "Passed" song; only has "burst light" performance stage. Joker Xue invited Dong Jiahong to perform with him.	
Love in Blue (愛在藍)	Ma Zihao	Bibi Zhou	Demo was titled The Chaos of Flowers (意乱花丛), it was renamed after Ma Zihao rewrote the lyrics to better suit Bibi Zhou.	
This Blue (這蔚藍)	Zhou Fujin	Liu Yuning	Song with most potential.	
Melody Journey: Season 1 Episode 8 (October 6)
Song	Songwriter(s)	Singer(s)	Notes	Ref.
Insignificant and Majestic (渺小与巍峨)	Bao Anquan	—	"Passed" song; no performance stage.	
Red Light Walk (红灯行)	Yang Moyi	—	"Passed" song; no performance stage.	
I Want to Write a Song for You (想給你寫首歌)	Xiao Ma M.Refre$H	Liu Yuning & Lil Ghost	—	
Empty (空空)	Xu Huanliang	—	"Passed" song; no performance stage.	
Gold Rush (淘金熱)	Jace Guo	Joker Xue & Jace Guo	Joker Xue invited Jace Guo to perform with him.	
That Day On the Road of No Return (在那天回不去的路上)	Mooney	Joker Xue	—	
Desolate Land (荒蕪之地)	Zhou Fujin	Zhou Shen	Song with most potential.	
The Lonely Musician (孤獨音樂家)	Jiang Haonan	Bibi Zhou	—	
Melody Journey: Season 1 Episode 9 (October 13)
Song	Songwriter(s)	Singer(s)	Notes	Ref.
A Free and Useless Soul (自由而無用的靈魂)	Luan Yize	Lars Huang	Song with most potential.	
No Regrets in Youth (無悔青春)	Deng Zhiwei	Lars Huang	—	
Put Pen to Paper (落筆成書)	Vincent Fang & Yanis Huang	Shan Yichun	—	
Put Pen to Paper (落筆成書)	Vincent Fang & Yanis Huang	Liu Xijun	Claimed via "burst light" option; challenge successful.	
Worst Kind of Love	Miao Weilin	Lil Ghost	—	
Worst Kind of Love	Miao Weilin	Yao Xiaotang	Claimed via "burst light" option; challenge unsuccessful.	
Farewell My Concubine (霸王別姬)	Joker Xue	Yao Xiaotang & Liu Duan Duan	Yao Xiaotang was matched with the song and invited Liu Duan Duan to perform with her.	
Tender	Lai Zhenming	Shan Yichun	—	
Melody Journey: Season 1 Episode 10 (October 20)
Song	Songwriter(s)	Singer(s)	Notes	Ref.
Hardworking Person (努力的人)	Li Bofan	—	"Passed" song; no performance stage.	
Colony (菌落)	Wang Zi	Bibi Zhou	—	
Exhaustion (耗盡)	Zhong Wanyun	Yao Xiaotang	—	
The Years That Were Good to Me (對我好的那些年)	Fang Wenshan & Huang Yuxun	Lil Ghost	—	
Hertz 1520 (赫茲1520)	Luo Jingwen	Lars Huang	—	
More and More (越來越)	Joker Xue	Liu Xijun	Matched and claimed via "burst light" option. Song with most potential.	
Falling (掉)	Sun Wei	Liu Yuning	—	
The Art of Farewell Behavior (告別時的行為藝術)	Sun Aili	—	"Passed" song; no performance stage.	
Melody Journey: Season 1 End-of-Season Festival (October 27)
Song	Songwriter(s)	Singer(s)	Notes	Ref.
When I (每當我)	Zhou Fujian	Lars Huang & Liu Yuning	Episode 4: Matched with Lars Huang	
The Lonely Musician (孤獨音樂家)	Jiang Haonan	Bibi Zhou & Zhou Shen	Episode 8: Matched with Bibi Zhou	
Do You Dare? (你敢嗎)	Ding Yu	Liu Duan Duan & Chen Zhuoxuan	Episode 7: Claimed by Liu Duan Duan via "burst light" option	
Tender	Lai Zhenming	Shan Yichun & Bibi Zhou	Episode 9: Matched with Shan Yichun	
Rent, Purchase (租購)	Dong Jiahong	Dong Jiahong	Episode 4: Matched with Joker Xue Cantonese version	
Hertz is the Frequency of Love (赫茲就是愛的頻率)	Luo Jingwen	Lars Huang	Episode 10: Matched with Lars Huang Modified title and lyrics to serve as promotional song of the title sponsor Hawthorn Tree	
Not Mentioning a Word (只字不提)	Bao Anquan & Joker Xue	Zhou Shen & Joker Xue	Episode 1: Claimed by Zhou Shen via "burst light" option Performance featured lyrics written by Joker Xue	
I Don't Care How Absurd the World Is (我不在乎世界如何荒唐)	Cai Youqi	Chen Zhuoxuan & Cai Youqi	Episode 5: Matched with Ayunga	
Worst Kind of Love	Miao Weilin	Lil Ghost & Liu Duan Duan	Episode 9: Matched with Lil Ghost	
Lifelong Loneliness (終身孤獨)	Ye Qing Sai Lan	Shan Yichun & Lars Huang	Episode 5: Matched with Shan Yichun	
Hardworking Person (努力的人)	Li Bofan	Liu Yuning	Episode 10: Passed by all singers	
Red Light Walk (紅燈行)	Yang Moyi	R.E.D	Episode 8: Passed by all singers	
I Want to Write a Song for You (想給你寫首歌)	Xiao Ma M.Refre$H	Liu Yuning, Lil Ghost & other singers	Episode 8: Matched with Liu Yuning and Lil Ghost	

=== Season 2 ===
Songs are listed in order of the room number each songwriter was in. For the End-of-Season Festival, which was a celebration of the season with collaborative performances of standout songs from various episodes, songs are listed in order of appearance.

Crush of Music: Season 2 Episode 1 (October 24)
Song	Songwriter(s)	Singer(s)	Notes	Ref.
Stubborn Illness (顽疾)	Chacha & Joker Xue	Joker Xue	Joker Xue wrote additional lyrics for the song. Song with most potential.	
Self-Praised Comprehensiveness (自诩周全)	Pan Xiao & Ji Kuikui	Zhou Shen	—	
Self-Praised Comprehensiveness (自诩周全)	Pan Xiao & Ji Kuikui	Liu Yuning	Claimed via "burst light" option.	
Time Difference (时差)	Yang Moyi	Wei Xiang	—	
Time Difference (时差)	Yang Moyi	Zhou Shen	Claimed via "burst light" option.	
Real Man (大丈夫)	ODD Chen Sijian	Zhang Junhao	Matched and claimed via "burst light" option.	
Regret Is (遗憾是)	Chen Guanyu & Xing Pai	Jane Zhang	—	
Regret Is (遗憾是)	Chen Guanyu & Xing Pai	Lars Huang	Claimed via "burst light" option. Invited Ouyang Nana to play the cello.	
Kite (风筝)	Zhang Ronghao	Yisa Yu	—	
Kite (风筝)	Zhang Ronghao	Ouyang Nana	Claimed via "burst light" option.	
Crush of Music: Season 2 Episode 2 (October 31)
Song	Songwriter(s)	Singer(s)	Notes	Ref.
Kids (小孩)	KAZE Zhan Yixuan	Seven Kids (Jane Zhang, Liu Yuning, Lars Huang, Ouyang Nana, Yisa Yu, Yu Yan, Zhang Junhao)	Liu Yuning had said if he was matched with the song, he would adapt it into a group song. Song with most potential.	
Lake (湖泊)	Zhang Ronghao	Joker Xue	—	
Youth (青春呐)	Jiang Haonan	Liu Yuning	—	
Youth (青春呐)	Jiang Haonan	Ouyang Nana	Claimed via "burst light" option.	
Off-Key (跑调)	Hua Tong & Jian Dabai	Wei Xiang	Matched and claimed via "burst light" option.	
Chain Reaction (连锁反应)	Fang Yi	Yisa Yu	—	
Chain Reaction (连锁反应)	Fang Yi	Yu Yan	Claimed via "burst light" option.	
Bad Song (烂歌)	Zhou Yongcheng	Lars Huang	—	
Crush of Music: Season 2 Episode 3 (November 7)
Song	Songwriter(s)	Singer(s)	Notes	Ref.
Evening Breeze, Please Tell Her (晚风请你告诉她)	Mao Ranhe & Cheng Huan	Zhou Shen	Song with most potential.	
Conan (柯南)	Xiaobin & Zhang Ludi	Lars Huang	Matched and claimed via "burst light" option.	
It Doesn't Matter (无所谓)	Zhang Yunong & Pei Zhisen	Liu Yuning & Yisa Yu	Originally, Liu Yuning was matched with the song and Yisa Yu claimed it via "burst light" option. They decided to perform it together instead of separately.	
Creation (造物)	Yutian & Li Cong	Zhou Shen	—	
Creation (造物)	Yutian & Li Cong	Curley Gao	Claimed via "burst light" option.	
Scar Body (疤痕体)	Fang Yi Khloe	Jane Zhang	—	
Mediocre (平庸)	Jiang Man & Joker Xue	Joker Xue	Joker Xue wrote additional lyrics that were used in both performance versions.	
Mediocre (平庸)	Jiang Man & Joker Xue	Jane Zhang	Claimed via "burst light" option.	
Crush of Music: Season 2 Episode 4 (November 14)
Song	Songwriter(s)	Singer(s)	Notes	Ref.
Raise the Ante (加码)	Yu Yifan	Jane Zhang	Matched and claimed via "burst light" option.	
It's the Rainy Season Again (雨季又来临)	Pan Cheng & Zhao Nan & Lu Huaiye	Zhou Shen	—	
The Elephant Man (象人)	Li Angxing	Zhang Chi	—	
The Elephant Man (象人)	Li Angxing	Zhou Shen	Claimed via "burst light" option.	
Say Your Name Ten Thousand Times (把你的名字念一万遍)	Qiao Juncheng	Liu Yuning	Song with most potential.	
Say Your Name Ten Thousand Times (把你的名字念一万遍)	Qiao Juncheng & Zhang Junhao	Zhang Junhao	Claimed via "burst light" option. Zhang Junhao wrote additional lyrics for his performance.	
What Am I To You (这样一来我算什么)	Guan Haoyi	Joker Xue & Krystal Chan	Intended to be a duet, matched to Joker Xue and Krystal Chan. Also claimed via "burst light" option by Joker Xue.	
Doomsday Sprint (末日狂奔)	Yutian & Xie Jinlin	Yisa Yu	—	
Doomsday Sprint (末日狂奔)	Yutian & Xie Jinlin	Lars Huang	Claimed via "burst light" option.	
Crush of Music: Season 2 Episode 5 (November 21)
Song	Songwriter(s)	Singer(s)	Notes	Ref.
I'm Too Poor (我太穷了吧)	Bao Anquan & Ma Yike & Zhang Sansan	Robby Huang & Muzi Song	Invited Muzi Song to perform with him.	
I'm Too Poor (我太穷了吧)	Bao Anquan & Ma Yike & Zhang Sansan	Liu Duan Duan	Claimed via "burst light" option.	
Farewell Trip (告别旅行)	Li Youyu & Fu Yao	Liu Yuning	—	
Farewell Trip (告别旅行)	Li Youyu & Fu Yao	Zhou Shen	Claimed via "burst light" option.	
Alice (爱丽丝卿)	Mooney	Zhou Shen	Song with most potential.	
Alice (爱丽丝卿)	Mooney	Robby Huang & Tan Jing	Claimed via "burst light" option. Invited Tan Jing to perform with him.	
It's Me, and It's Us (是我, 也是我们)	Uncle Ning of Lu Ke & Xu Chonglai	Tan Jing	Invited Ouyang Nana to play the cello.	
It's Me, and It's Us (是我, 也是我们)	Uncle Ning of Lu Ke & Xu Chonglai	Lars Huang	Claimed via "burst light" option.	
Pretentious People (装货)	Zhu Dengyu & Dai Jiamian & R.E.D	R.E.D	R.E.D wrote additional lyrics to add a rap segment in the song.	
Pretentious People (装货)	Zhu Dengyu & Dai Jiamian & Joker Xue	Joker Xue & Ouyang Nana	Claimed via "burst light" option. Joker Xue wrote additional lyrics to change the song into a duet. Invited Ouyang Nana to perform with him.	
The Rhetorical Devices I Know (我所知道的修辞手法)	Murphy Band	Jane Zhang	Matched and claimed via "burst light" option.	
Crush of Music: Season 2 Episode 6 (November 28)
Song	Songwriter(s)	Singer(s)	Notes	Ref.
Possession (占有)	Jiang Man & Gao Lechang	Ouyang Nana	—	
Possession (占有)	Jiang Man & Gao Lechang	R.E.D	Claimed via "burst light" option.	
Thump Thump (扑通扑通)	Mooney	Liu Yuning	—	
Thump Thump (扑通扑通)	Mooney	Zhou Shen	Claimed via "burst light" option.	
Escape the Night (逃开夜幕)	Zhao Jiarui & Bai Siyun & Zhou Shen	Zhou Shen	Zhou Shen wrote additional lyrics to add a rap segment in the song.	
Busy, Dazed, Blind (忙茫盲)	Dong Jiahong	Tan Jing	—	
I Hate Her (我讨厌她)	Li Junyi & Yao Yuzheng	Robby Huang	—	
I Hate Her (我讨厌她)	Li Junyi & Yao Yuzheng	Liu Duan Duan	Claimed via "burst light" option.	
Farmers and the Land (农民与土地)	Chengliang & Joker Xue	Joker Xue	Joker Xue wrote additional lyrics for the song. Song with most potential.	
Crush of Music: Season 2 Episode 7 (December 5)
Song	Songwriter(s)	Singer(s)	Notes	Ref.
Frank (坦白)	Yu Yifan	Joker Xue	Song with most potential.	
Compassion (怜悯)	Jiang Man	Jane Zhang	—	
Compassion (怜悯)	Jiang Man	Zhou Shen	Claimed via "burst light" option.	
Riddle (哑谜)	Lin Yifan & Ji Mingle	Yao Xiaotang	—	
Riddle (哑谜)	Lin Yifan & Ji Mingle	Lars Huang	Claimed via "burst light" option.	
Make Up Forever	Bi Xiaoxin	Zhou Shen	—	
Make Up Forever	Bi Xiaoxin	Yu Yan	Claimed via "burst light" option.	
Good Friend (好盆与)	Yang Moyi	Ouyang Nana	—	
Good Friend (好盆与)	Yang Moyi	Jiang Dunhao	Claimed via "burst light" option.	
Easter Egg (彩蛋)	Zhou Can'en & Fu Yao & Li Youyu	Wei Xiang & Xiaoshenyang	Invited Xiaoshenyang to perform with him.	
Crush of Music: Season 2 Episode 8 (December 12)
Song	Songwriter(s)	Singer(s)	Notes	Ref.
Sometimes I Want to Be a Cat (有时候想变成一只猫)	Sun Muhhan	Jane Zhang	—	
Sometimes I Want to Be a Cat (有时候想变成一只猫)	Sun Muhhan	Ouyang Nana	Claimed via "burst light" option.	
The Child and Me (小孩与我)	Yu Yifan	Wei Xiang & Joker Xue	Invited Joker Xue to perform with him.	
The Child and Me (小孩与我)	Yu Yifan	Jiang Dunhao	Claimed via "burst light" option.	
The Earth Without You (地球没有你)	Age of Water and Wood	Zhou Shen	—	
Half (一半)	Zheng Kai & Chen Xukan	Lars Huang	Song with most potential.	
Half (一半)	Zheng Kai & Chen Xukan	Yu Yan	Claimed via "burst light" option.	
Flip-Flops (人字拖)	Fang Yi & Joker Xue	Joker Xue	Joker Xue wrote additional lyrics for the song.	
Or Maybe We Should Just Forget It (不然算了吧)	Eric	Liu Yuning	—	
Crush of Music: Season 2 Episode 9 (December 19)
Song	Songwriter(s)	Singer(s)	Notes	Ref.
Another Day Has Passed (又过了一天)	Wang Zi	Lars Huang	—	
Another Day Has Passed (又过了一天)	Wang Zi	Tan Jing	Claimed via "burst light" option.	
Friendly Reminder (友情提示)	Li Angxing	Hou Minghao	—	
Friendly Reminder (友情提示)	Li Angxing	Joker Xue	Claimed via "burst light" option.	
Expired Food (过期食品)	Yuan Jingxiang	Jane Zhang	Song with most potential.	
Cartoon Battle (动画片战役)	ODD Chen Sijian	Zhang Chi	—	
Cartoon Battle (动画片战役)	ODD Chen Sijian	Essay Wang	Claimed via "burst light" option.	
Signal (讯号)	KAZE Zhan Yixuan & Guan Tiantian	Seven Kids (Jane Zhang, Liu Yuning, Lars Huang, Ouyang Nana, Yisa Yu, Yu Yan, Zhang Junhao)	Liu Yuning was matched with the song and reunited the Seven Kids group to perform it with him.	
Signal (讯号)	KAZE Zhan Yixuan & Guan Tiantian	Curley Gao	Claimed via "burst light" option.	
Raining All Over the World (全世界下雨)	Xiao Ma M.Refre$H	Zhou Shen	—	
Crush of Music: Season 2 Episode 10 (December 26)
Song	Songwriter(s)	Singer(s)	Notes	Ref.
Those Who Are Meant to Meet Will Meet Again (该相逢的人会再相逢)	Qiao Juncheng	Liu Yuning	—	
Regret Is Like a Breeze (遗憾是一阵风)	Wang Yaoyang & Fan Fan	Liu Duanduan	—	
Retreat (撤退)	Jace Guo	Hou Minghao	—	
Retreat (撤退)	Jace Guo	Xiao Aqi	Claimed via "burst light" option.	
Night at the Museum (博物馆奇妙夜)	Zhang Ronghao	Curley Gao	—	
Bat (蝠)	Li Angxing	Tan Jing	—	
Bat (蝠)	Li Angxing	Zhang Chi & Joker Xue	Claimed via "burst light" option. Invited Joker Xue to perform with him.	
Mountain Spirit (山灵)	Jiang Man	Zhou Shen	—	
Crush of Music: Season 2 End-of-Season Festival (January 2)
Song	Songwriter(s)	Singer(s)	Notes	Ref.
Say Your Name Ten Thousand Times (把你的名字念一万遍)	Qiao Juncheng	Liu Yuning & Zhang Junhao	Episode 4: Matched with Liu Yuning and claimed by Zhang Junhao via "burst light" option.	
The Rhetorical Devices I Know (我所知道的修辞手法)	Murphy Band	Jane Zhang & Yu Yan	Episode 5: Matched with Jane Zhang.	
Doomsday Sprint (末日狂奔)	Yutian & Xie Jinlin	Lars Huang & Yisa Yu	Episode 2: Matched with Yisa Yu and claimed by Lars Huang via "burst light" option.	
Self-Praised Comprehensiveness (自诩周全)	Pan Xiao & Ji Kuikui	Zhou Shen & Liu Yuning	Episode 1: Matched with Zhou Shen and claimed by Liu Yuning via "burst light" option.	
The Elephant Man (象人)	Li Angxing	Zhang Chi & Li Angxing	Episode 4: Matched with Zhang Chi,	
Regret Is (遗憾是)	Chen Guanyu & Xing Pai	Ouyang Nana	Episode 1: Ouyang Nana played the cello during Lars Huang's performance.	
Expired Food (过期食品)	Yuan Jingxiang	Jane Zhang	Episode 9: Matched with Jane Zhang.	
Or Maybe We Should Just Forget It (不然算了吧)	Eric	Liu Yuning	Episode 8: Matched with Liu Yuning.	
Half (一半)	Zheng Kai & Chen Xukan	Lars Huang	Episode 8: Matched with Lars Huang	
Compassion (怜悯)	Jiang Man	Zhou Shen	Episode 7: Claimed by Zhou Shen via "burst light" option.	
Kids (小孩) & Signal (讯号)	KAZE Zhan Yixuan, KAZE Zhan Yixuan & Guan Tiantian	Seven Kids (Jane Zhang, Liu Yuning, Lars Huang, Ouyang Nana, Yisa Yu, Yu Yan, Zhang Junhao)	Episodes 2 & 9: Matched with Liu Yuning, who organized the Seven Kids group.	
Thump Thump (扑通扑通)	Mooney	R.E.D	Episode 6: Matched with Liu Yuning and claimed by Zhou Shen via "burst light" option.	
Possession (占有)	Jiang Man & Gao Lechang	Zhou Shen & Joker Xue	Episode 6: Matched with Ouyang Nana and claimed by R.E.D via "burst light" option.	
Another Day Has Passed (又过了一天)	Wang Zi	Lars Huang & Zhang Chi	Episode 9: Matched with Lars Huang.	
Make Up Forever	Bi Xiaoxin	Yisa Yu & Yu Yan	Episode 7: Claimed by Yu Yan via "burst light" option.	
Youth (青春呐)	Jiang Haonan	Ouyang Nana & Zhang Junhao	Episode 2: Claimed by Ouyang Nana via "burst light" option.	
Farewell My Concubine (霸王別姬)	Joker Xue	Joker Xue & Jane Zhang	Season 1 Episode 9: Joker Xue appeared as the songwriter for that episode.	
It's Me, and It's Us (是我, 也是我们)	Uncle Ning of Lu Ke & Xu Chonglai	Bi Xiaoxin, Chen Xukan, Eric, Murphy Band, Yang Moyi, Dong Jiahong, Qiao Juncheng, Jiang Man, Li Angxing, Wang Zi, KAZE Zhan Yixuan, Chen Guanyu	Episode 2: Matched with Tan Jing and claimed by Lars Huang via "burst light" option. Performed by songwriters.	

== QQ Music Heatscore ==
=== Season 1 ===
Melody Journey Season 1: Song with Highest QQ Music Heatscore (as of December 20, 2025)
Episode #	Song	Songwriter(s)	Singer	Heatscore
1	DO U	Xiao Ma M.Refre$H	Lars Huang	27.25 million
2	Nothing Left (没有了)	Mooney	Chen Linong	18.69 million
3	Asking Knowingly (明知故問)^{1}	Jace Guo	Jane Zhang & Shan Yichun	10.76 million
4	Rent, Purchase (租購)	Dong Jiahong	Joker Xue	106.93 million
5	Lifelong Loneliness (終身孤獨)	Ye Qing Sai Lan	Shan Yichun	7.16 million
6	Forget Me (忘了我)	Jiang Haonan	Zhou Shen	10.80 million
7	Don't Keep Feeling Crestfallen (你不要垂頭喪氣的)	Dong Jiahong	Joker Xue & Dong Jiahong	8.66 million
8	That Day On the Road of No Return (在那天回不去的路上)	Mooney	Joker Xue	12.65 million
9	Farewell My Concubine (霸王別姬)	Joker Xue	Yao Xiaotang & Liu Duan Duan	10.63 million
10	Hertz 1520 (赫茲1520)	Luo Jingwen	Lars Huang	8.50 million
End-of-Season Festival	Not Mentioning a Word (只字不提)	Ou Heng & Joker Xue	Zhou Shen & Joker Xue	23.01 million

^Note 1: Selected as song with most potential of the episode.

Melody Journey Season 1: Top 10 Songs with Highest QQ Music Heatscore (as of December 20, 2025)
Rank	Song	Songwriter(s)	Singer	Heatscore	Episode #
1	Rent, Purchase (租購)	Dong Jiahong	Joker Xue	106.93 million	4
2	DO U	Xiao Ma M.Refre$H	Lars Huang	27.25 million	2
3	Silence of the Lamb (沉默的羔羊)	Yu Dongran	Zhou Shen	25.34 million	1
4	Not Mentioning a Word (只字不提)	Ou Heng & Joker Xue	Zhou Shen & Joker Xue	23.01 million	11
5	Nothing Left (没有了)	Mooney	Chen Linong	18.69 million	2
6	Not Mentioning a Word (只字不提)	Bao Anquan	Zhou Shen	15.97 million	1
7	Nothing Left (没有了)	Mooney	Liu Duan Duan & Duan Aojuan	13.81 million	2
8	That Day On the Road of No Return (在那天回不去的路上)	Mooney	Joker Xue	12.65 million	8
9	In Between the Upside Down (顛倒之間)	Wu Hewen	Zhou Shen	11.50 million	2
10	Forget Me (忘了我)	Jiang Haonan	Zhou Shen	10.80 million	6

=== Season 2 ===
Crush of Music Season 2: Song with Highest QQ Music Heatscore (as of April 14, 2026)
Episode #	Song	Songwriter(s)	Singer	Heatscore
1	Time Difference (时差)	Yang Moyi	Wei Xiang	99.93 million
2	Lake (湖泊)	Zhang Ronghao	Joker Xue	21.56 million
3	Mediocre (平庸)	Jiang Man	Joker Xue	131.16 million
4	Say Your Name Ten Thousand Times (把你的名字念一万遍)^{1}	Qiao Juncheng	Liu Yuning	41.74 million
5	Alice (爱丽丝卿)^{1}	Mooney	Zhou Shen	38.31 million
6	Farmers and the Land (农民与土地)^{1}	Chengliang & Joker Xue	Joker Xue	48.28 million
7	Compassion (怜悯)	Jiang Man	Zhou Shen	117.05 million
8	The Earth Without You (地球没有你)	Age of Water and Wood	Zhou Shen	34.23 million
9	Raining All Over the World (全世界下雨)	Xiao Ma M.Refre$H	Zhou Shen	38.70 million
10	Mountain Spirit (山灵)	Jiang Man	Zhou Shen	25.94 million
11	Possession (占有)	Jiang Man & Gao Lechang	Zhou Shen & Joker Xue	18.43 million

^Note 1: Selected as song with most potential of the episode.

Crush of Music Season 2: Top 10 Songs with Highest QQ Music Heatscore (as of April 14, 2026)
Rank	Song	Songwriter(s)	Singer	Heatscore	Episode #
1	Mediocre (平庸)	Jiang Man	Joker Xue	131.16 million	3
2	Compassion (怜悯)	Jiang Man	Zhou Shen	117.05 million	7
3	Time Difference (时差)	Yang Moyi	Wei Xiang	99.93 million	1
4	Stubborn Illness (顽疾)	Chacha & Joker Xue	Joker Xue	81.15 million	1
5	Time Difference (时差)	Yang Moyi	Zhou Shen	67.12 million	1
6	Self-Praised Comprehensiveness (自诩周全)	Pan Xiao & Ji Kuikui	Liu Yuning	65.35 million	1
7	Self-Praised Comprehensiveness (自诩周全)	Pan Xiao & Ji Kuikui	Zhou Shen	57.29 million	1
8	Farmers and the Land (农民与土地)	Chengliang & Joker Xue	Joker Xue	48.28 million	6
9	Say Your Name Ten Thousand Times (把你的名字念一万遍)	Qiao Juncheng	Liu Yuning	41.76 million	4
10	Raining All Over the World (全世界下雨)	Xiao Ma M.Refre$H	Zhou Shen	38.70 million	9

=== Cumulative ===
Melody Journey: Singers with Highest QQ Music Heatscore Songs (as of January 2, 2026)
Number of Songs	Singer	Song	Songwriter
8	Joker Xue	Rent, Purchase (租購)	Dong Jiahong
8	Joker Xue	Don't Keep Feeling Crestfallen (你不要垂頭喪氣的)^{2}	Dong Jiahong
8	Joker Xue	That Day On the Road of No Return (在那天回不去的路上)	Mooney
8	Joker Xue	Not Mentioning a Word (只字不提)^{2}	Ou Heng & Joker Xue
8	Joker Xue	Lake (湖泊)	Zhang Ronghao
8	Joker Xue	Mediocre (平庸)	Jiang Man & Joker Xue
8	Joker Xue	Farmers and the Land (农民与土地)	Chengliang & Joker Xue
8	Joker Xue	Possession (占有)^{2}	Jiang Man & Gao Lechang
8	Zhou Shen	Forget Me (忘了我)	Jiang Haonan
8	Zhou Shen	Not Mentioning a Word (只字不提)^{2}	Ou Heng & Joker Xue
8	Zhou Shen	Alice (爱丽丝卿)	Mooney
8	Zhou Shen	Compassion (怜悯)	Jiang Man
8	Zhou Shen	The Earth Without You (地球没有你)	Age of Water and Wood
8	Zhou Shen	Raining All Over the World (全世界下雨)	Xiao Ma M.Refre$H
8	Zhou Shen	Mountain Spirit (山灵)	Jiang Man
8	Zhou Shen	Possession (占有)^{2}	Jiang Man & Gao Lechang
2	Lars Huang	DO U	Xiao Ma M.Refre$H
2	Lars Huang	Hertz 1520 (赫茲1520)	Luo Jingwen
2	Shan Yichun	Asking Knowingly (明知故問)^{2}	Jace Guo
2	Shan Yichun	Lifelong Loneliness (終身孤獨)	Ye Qing Sai Lan
1	Chen Linong	Nothing Left (没有了)	Mooney
1	Jane Zhang	Asking Knowingly (明知故問)^{2}	Jace Guo
1	Dong Jiahong	Don't Keep Feeling Crestfallen (你不要垂頭喪氣的)^{2}	Dong Jiahong
1	Yao Xiaotang	Farewell My Concubine (霸王別姬)^{2}	Joker Xue
1	Liu Duan Duan	Farewell My Concubine (霸王別姬)^{2}	Joker Xue
1	Liu Yuning	Say Your Name Ten Thousand Times (把你的名字念一万遍)	Qiao Juncheng
1	Wei Xiang	Time Difference (时差)	Yang Moyi

^Note 2: Multiple performers.

== Episode ratings ==
=== Season 1 ===
Melody Journey: Season 1 Ratings
Episode #	Network	Time slot	CSM71		CSM 35		Ref.
Episode #	Network	Time slot	Rating	Ranking	Rating	Ranking	Ref.
1	Jiangsu Satellite TV	Sundays, 9:00pm CST	1.95	1	2.16	1	
2	Jiangsu Satellite TV	Sundays, 9:00pm CST	2.12	1	2.36	1	
3	Jiangsu Satellite TV	Sundays, 9:00pm CST	1.79	1	1.99	1	
4	Jiangsu Satellite TV	Sundays, 9:00pm CST	2.23	1	2.51	1	
5	Jiangsu Satellite TV	Sundays, 9:00pm CST	1.96	1	2.20	1	
6	Jiangsu Satellite TV	Sundays, 9:00pm CST	2.41	1	2.73	1	
7	Jiangsu Satellite TV	Sundays, 9:00pm CST	2.17	1	2.43	1	
8	Jiangsu Satellite TV	Sundays, 9:00pm CST	2.19	2	2.45	2	
9	Jiangsu Satellite TV	Sundays, 9:00pm CST	1.98	1	2.24	1	
10	Jiangsu Satellite TV	Sundays, 9:00pm CST	2.31	1	2.63	1	

=== Season 2 ===
Crush of Music: Season 2 Ratings
Episode #	Network	Time slot	CSM71		CSM 35		Ref.
Episode #	Network	Time slot	Rating	Ranking	Rating	Ranking	Ref.
1	Jiangsu Satellite TV	Fridays, 8:30pm CST	1.75	2	1.86	2	
2	Jiangsu Satellite TV	Fridays, 8:30pm CST	1.583	2	1.716	2	
3	Jiangsu Satellite TV	Fridays, 8:30pm CST	1.663	2	1.732	2	
4	Jiangsu Satellite TV	Fridays, 8:30pm CST	1.762	2	1.876	2	
5	Jiangsu Satellite TV	Fridays, 8:30pm CST	1.533	1	1.569	1	
6	Jiangsu Satellite TV	Fridays, 8:30pm CST	1.658	1	1.703	1	
7	Jiangsu Satellite TV	Fridays, 8:30pm CST	1.617	1	1.657	1	
8	Jiangsu Satellite TV	Fridays, 8:30pm CST	1.326	1	1.404	1	
9	Jiangsu Satellite TV	Fridays, 8:30pm CST	1.595	1	1.660	1	
10	Jiangsu Satellite TV	Fridays, 8:30pm CST	1.237	1	1.281	1	

== Awards and nominations ==
Year	Award	Category	Result	Ref.
2024	TV Landmark Awards (TV地标)	Provincial Satellite TV's Annual Innovative and Influential Program (省级卫视年度创新影响力节目)	Won	
2024	Weibo Variety Show Awards (微博综艺大赏)	Popular Variety Show of the Year (年度人气综艺)	Won	
2025	Asian Television Awards (亚洲电视大奖)	Best Music Program (最佳音乐节目)	Won	
2025	Weibo Vision Conference (微博视界大会)	Most Popular Work of the Year (年度大众喜爱作品)	Won	
