= Warren Mok =

Warren Mok 莫華倫
- Genre: Opera
- Occupation: Tenor
- Website: www.warrenmok.com

Warren Mok (Chinese: 莫華倫) is a Hong Kong-based Macau operatic tenor who has performed many leading roles since his European debut in 1987 at the Deutsche Oper Berlin. He has a repertoire of 50 operatic roles, including Calaf in Turandot, Cavaradossi in Tosca, Don José in Carmen, and Radames in Aida. He has recorded many solo albums and opera CDs, including Il trovatore, Simon Boccanegra, Roma, Robert le diable and Les Huguenots. He has also appeared regularly on television and radio programs worldwide.

Mok is the artistic director of the Macau International Music Festival and founder and artistic director of Opera Hong Kong. He is a graduate of the University of Hawaiʻi and holds a Master of Music degree from Manhattan School of Music.

Mok tested positive for COVID-19 in March 2020 in Bangkok and again in April in Hong Kong. He was discharged after 38 days in hospital in Bangkok and Hong Kong.
