= Tencent Music Entertainment Awards =

Chinese music awards ceremony

- Country: China
- Presented by: Tencent Music
- First award: 2019

Tencent Music Entertainment Awards (TMEA) is an awards ceremony founded by Tencent Music in 2019. It is held annually, replacing QQ Music's QQ Music Awards and KuGou's Ku Music Asian Music Awards. Both QQ Music and KuGou are part of Tencent music. The award recognizes the top artists among Tencent Music's various music streaming platforms.

== History ==
Ceremony	Date	Venue	Theme
1st TMEA	December 8, 2019	Venetian Arena	It's t1me for music.
2nd TMEA	January 23, 2021	Venetian Arena	Music to Live
3rd TMEA	December 11, 2021	Venetian Arena	3ing for music
4th TMEA	July 8-9, 2023	Galaxy Arena	Music for 4un
5th TMEA	July 21, 2024	Galaxy Arena	High Five, Music Drive
6th TMEA	August 24, 2025	Galaxy Arena	Cheers for Musix
7th TMEA	August 16, 2026	Galaxy Arena	7ap to Music

== Winners ==
=== 1st TMEA, 2019 ===
Below is the list of the winners of the 1st TMEA.

- Most Popular
  - Mainland, male artist: Lay Zhang
  - Mainland, female artist: Meng Meiqi
  - Hong Kong/Taiwan, male artist: Chen Linong
  - Hong Kong/Taiwan, female artist: G.E.M.
  - Group: TFBoys
  - International artist: Chanyeol
- Best Of
  - Mainland, male artist: Joker Xue
  - Mainland, female artist: Jane Zhang
  - Hong Kong/Taiwan, male artist: JJ Lin
  - Hong Kong/Taiwan, female artist: G.E.M.
  - Group: TFBoys
  - New artist, male artist: Liu Yuning
  - New artist, female artist: Shirley Chen
  - International artist: Alan Walker
  - Japanese/Korean artist: Blackpink
  - Group album: Going To Powerfully Burst by R1SE
  - OST album: The Untamed
  - Original music artist: Khalil Fong
- Best-selling
  - Digital album: NAMANANA by Lay Zhang
  - Digital EP: Young by Cai Xukun
  - Digital single: "Half of Me" by Chen Linong
- Music Streaming Platforms
  - QQ Music top singer: Lay Zhang
  - KuGou Music song of the year: "Unrestrained" by Xiao Zhan & Wang Yibo
  - KuWo Music "Exemplary Reading" charity artist: Wang Yibo
  - WeSing song of the year: "Years Later" by Da Huan
- New Music Power
  - Electronic music: CORSAK
  - Virtual idol: Ye Luoluo
  - Rock: New Pants
  - Band: Excuse Me Band
  - Film/television OST artist: Liu Yuning
  - Video game OST artist: Infinite Kings
  - Traditional Chinese style music: Super Impassioned Net Generation
  - Anime: Hiroyuki Sawano
  - Group: Teens in Times
  - KuGou Music: Jiao Maiqi
  - QQ Music: Boy Story
- Top 10 Songs of the Year
  - "A Song of Longing" by Banyang
  - "Green" by Chen Xuening
  - "Still Water" by Ice Paper
  - "The Rest of My Life" by Ma Liang & Sun Qianru
  - "Zhi Fou Zhi Fou" by Hu Xia & Yisa Yu
  - "Waiting for the Next Him" by Feng Timo
  - "Like a Fish" by Wang Erlang
  - "A Million Possibilities" by Hu Er
  - "That Girl Said to Me" by Uu
  - "Falling" by Ai Chen

=== 2nd TMEA, 2020 ===
Below is the list of winners of the 2nd TMEA.

- Best Of
  - Mainland, male artist: Zhou Shen
  - Mainland, female artist: Jane Zhang
  - Hong Kong/Taiwan, male artist: JJ Lin
  - Hong Kong/Taiwan, female artist: G.E.M.
  - Producer: JJ Lin
  - Band: Mayday
  - Most Potential: Chen Linong
  - International artist: Taylor Swift
  - International group: Blackpink
  - Charity album: The Sound of China
- Most Influential
  - Mainland, male artist: Joker Xue
  - Mainland, female artist: Chen Li
  - Hong Kong/Taiwan, male artist: Jay Chou
  - Hong Kong/Taiwan, female artist: Hebe Tian
  - Singer-songwriter: Cai Xukun
- Most Popular
  - Artist: Cai Xukun
  - Online concert: Mayday's "Live in the Sky"
  - Digital EP: Blue Sky by Zhang Yunlei
  - Digital single: "Spotlight" by Xiao Zhan
  - Digital album: LIT by Lay Zhang
- Of the Year
  - New all-rounder: Chen Linong
  - Film/television OST album: Eternal Love of Dream
  - Film/television OST single: "Miss You 3000" by 831
  - Singer-songwriter, male: Silence Wang
  - Singer-songwriter, female: Meng Ran
  - Electronic music artist: CORSAK
  - Traditional Chinese style music artists: Deng Shenme Jun & Super Impassioned Net Generation
  - Virtual idol group: Infinite Kings
  - Breakthrough artist: Feng Timo
  - New power artists: A Youyou & Ren Ran
- Music Streaming Platforms
  - QQ Music rapper of the year: Lil Ghost
  - KuGou Music new artist with most potential: Lingyijiuling'er
  - KuWo Music most popular single of the year: "Lights" by TFBoys
  - WeSing most popular artist: Joker Xue
  - Tencent Music new power artist: Bomb Bill
  - UNI Chart best consecutive champion song: "Mojito" by Jay Chou
- Top 10 Songs of the Year
  - "Sparrow" by Li Ronghao
  - "Full Stop" by G.E.M.
  - "Breaking the Cocoon" by Angela Zhang
  - "Lover" by Cai Xukun
  - "Won't Cry" by Jay Chou
  - "Extraterrestrial" by Joker Xue
  - "Miss You 3000" by 831
  - "Priceless Sister" by Chris Lee
  - "Writing Our Story" by JJ Lin
  - "Untouchable" by Zhou Shen
- Top 10 Hit Songs of the Year
  - "Girl by the Bridge" by Helen
  - "Your Answer" by A Rong
  - "Youth" by Meng Ran
  - "Hibernation" by Si Nan
  - "Grain in Ear" by Yin Que Shi Ting & Zhao Fangjing
  - "Coming Down the Mountain" by Yao Bu Yao Mai Cai
  - "The World Is So Big, Yet I Met You" by Cheng Xiang
  - "The Song Requester" by Hailai Amu
  - "Missing You by a Whisker" by A Youyou
  - "Fragrance of a Hundred Flowers" by Wei Xinyu

=== 3rd TMEA, 2021 ===
Below is the list of winners of the 3rd TMEA.

- Best Of
  - Mainland, male artist: Zhou Shen
  - Mainland, female artist: Yisa Yu
  - Hong Kong/Taiwan, male artist: Wu Qing-feng
  - Hong Kong/Taiwan, female artist: Jolin Tsai
  - Producer: JJ Lin
  - Band: Escape Plan
  - Group: Teens in Times
  - Singer-songwriter: Mao Buyi
  - Rapper: Liu Yuxin
  - International artist: Taylor Swift
  - International group: EXO
  - Ballad performer: Rene Liu
  - Stage performer: Li Wenhan
  - Video game song: "Flight Conductor" by Hua Chenyu
- Most Influential
  - Mainland, male artist: Joker Xue
  - Mainland, female artist: Sara Liu
  - Hong Kong/Taiwan, male artist: JJ Lin
  - Hong Kong/Taiwan, female artist: G.E.M.
  - Singer-songwriter: Silence Wang
  - Producer: Cai Xukun
  - Group: Mayday
- Most Popular
  - Online concert: Mayday's "Fly to You"
- New Power
  - Artist, Hong Kong/Taiwan: OSN
  - Artist, Mainland: Yao Chen
  - Group: Into1
- Of the Year
  - Motivational song: "The Internationale" by Sun Nan and Zhou Shen
  - Film/television OST album: Like a Flowing River 2
  - Film/television OST single: "A Little Red Flower" by Zhao Yingjun
  - Breakthrough artist: Wang Jingwen
  - Artist with most potential: Shan Yichun
  - Rapper: GAI
  - Traditional Chinese style music artist: Deng Shenme Jun
  - Electronic music producer: Chace
  - Special charitable project: "Seeking the Sound of the Blue"
- Music Streaming Platforms
  - QQ Music best collaboration: Hu Yanbin
  - KuGou Music most influential artist: An Suyu
  - KuWo Music most influential DJ: He Peng
  - WeSing most popular aong: "Guest" by Zhang Yuan
  - Tencent Music best original music artist: Liu Shuang
- Top 10 Songs of the Year
  - "Feel Her" by Cai Xukun
  - "Tian Wen" by Liu Yuning
  - "So Many People in This World" by Karen Mok
  - "Stars Align" by R3hab & Jolin Tsai
  - "None of Your Business" by Teens in Times
  - "If the Voice Doesn't Remember" by Wu Qingfeng
  - "Reluctant to Let Go" by Lala Hsu
  - "Exhausted" by Joker Xue & Guo Congming
  - "A Little Red Flower" by Zhao Yingjun
  - "Harmonizing with the Light and Dust" by Zhou Shen
- Top 10 Hit Songs of the Year
  - "Clouds and Sea" by Ah YueYue
  - "White Moonlight and Vermilion Mole" by Da Zi
  - "Idle Talk of a Wanderer" by Hua Tong
  - "An Unwaking Dream" by Hui Xiaoxian
  - "Traversing Mountains and Rivers" by Qi Shu
  - "Millions" by Deep Sea Caviar
  - "Falling" by Wang Jingwen
  - "The Shepherd of Keketuohai" by Wang Qi
  - "Clear the Slate" by Wang Xinchen & Su Xingjie
  - "Obsessed" by Xiao Le Ge

=== 4th TMEA, 2023 ===
Below is the list of winners of the 4th annual TMEA.

- Best Of
  - Mainland, male artist: Jason Zhang
  - Mainland, female artist: Jane Zhang
  - Hong Kong/Taiwan, male artist: JJ Lin
  - Hong Kong/Taiwan, female artist: Liu Yuxin
  - Producer, Mainland: Silence Wang
- Most Influential
  - Mainland, male artist: Zhou Shen
  - Mainland, female artist: Liu Yuxin
  - Hong Kong/Taiwan, male artist: Jay Chou
  - Hong Kong/Taiwan, female artist: Jolin Tsai
  - Singer-songwriter: Tiger Hu
  - Producer: JJ Lin
- New Power
  - Singer-songwriter: Wen Junhui
  - Artist: Jace Guo
  - Producer: Liu Yuxin
- Of the Year
  - Quality singer: Tia Ray
  - Breakthrough singer-songwriter: Wen Junhui
  - Artist with most potential: Wang Jingwen
  - Crossover collaboration single: "Doesn't Matter" by Jolin Tsai & Steve Aoki & MAX
  - Video game OST: Genshin Impact: The Stellar Moments Vol. 2
  - Best Animation OST: Arcane League of Legends
  - Film & TV single: "Love of Parting" by Faye Zhan
  - Film & TV OST album: Love Between Fairy and Devil
  - Most popular concert: YoungJack's "Offline Tour"
  - Stage performer: Faye Zhan
  - Special charitable project: Little Red Flower Charity Concert's "Songs of Unexpected Encounters"
- Music Streaming Platforms
  - KuGou Music artist with most potential: Yu Dongran
  - KuWo Music best popular song creator: DJ Xiaoyuer
  - QQ Music most popular artist: Justin Huang
  - UNI Chart best consecutive champion song: "Flowers Bloom, Worries Fade" by Zhou Shen
- Top 10 Songs of the Year
  - "Song of the Snow Dragon" by Jason Zhang
  - "Lonely Warrior" by Eason Chan
  - "As Before" by Zhang Bichen
  - "Wish" by Faye Wong
  - "Perfect Match" by Teens in Times
  - "Light Wrapped Around the Heart" by JJ Lin
  - "Love's Farewell" by Faye Zhan
  - "But" by Joker Xue & Jane Zhang
  - "Greatest Works of Art" by Jay Chou
  - "Before the Tears Fall" by Silence Wang
- Top 10 Hit Songs of the Year
  - "Summer in a Small Town" by LBI
  - "Mom's Words" by Zyboy Zhongyu
  - "Diving Deep" by Chuan Qing
  - "Just Forget It" by 1K
  - "A Match Made in Heaven" by Fu Xue
  - "You Once Said" by Zhao Naiji
  - "Mirage" by Sanshu Shuo
  - "Fifty Years Later" by Hailai Amu
  - "Sunset and Evening Breeze" by IN-K & Wang Xinchen & Su Xingjie
  - "Heard You Are Far Away" by Liu Yiwen

=== 5th TMEA, 2024 ===
Below is the list of winners of the 5th TMEA.

- Of the Year
  - Male artist: Zhou Shen
  - Female artist: Jane Zhang
  - Concert tour: Joker Xue's Extraterrestrial World Tour
  - Digital album: Happily, Painfully After by JJ Lin
  - Physical album: Liu Yanfen by Jackson Yee
  - Special charitable project: Fiona Sit's "Do You Understand the Rest?"
  - Motivational song: "She Who Rests on the Light" by Ren Suxi
  - Physical album design: 21st Century Romance by Silence Wang
  - Rock single: "Rock Zone" by Power Station
  - Film & TV singles: "Cage" by Zhang Bichen & "Meet Yourself" by Yisa Yu
  - Film & TV OST albums: Till the End of the Moon & Lost You Forever
- Best Of
  - Mainland, male artist: Joker Xue
  - Mainland, female artist: Shan Yichun
  - Mainland, singer-songwriter: Roy Wang
  - Hong Kong/Taiwan, male artist: Wilber Pan
  - Hong Kong/Taiwan, female artist: Angela Zhang
  - Hong Kong/Taiwan, singer-songwriter: JJ Lin
  - Chinese Group: Teens in Times
  - International artist: Ed Sheeran
  - International single: "Blue Bird" by Ikimonogakari
  - All-round artist: Jolin Tsai
  - Rapper: Lil Ghost
  - Traditional Chinese style music artist: Deng Shenme Jun
  - Electronic music artist: CORSAK
  - Rock band: Supper Moment
  - Animation theme song: "Fight Song" by Coco Lee
- Most Influential
  - Mainland, male artist: Roy Wang
  - Mainland, female artist: Tia Ray
  - Mainland, singer-songwriter: Chen Li
  - Hong Kong/Taiwan, male artist: Eason Chan
  - Hong Kong/Taiwan, female artist: G.E.M.
  - Hong Kong/Taiwan, singer-songwriter: Jay Chou
  - Group: Mayday
  - International artist: Taylor Swift
  - All-rounder artist: Zhou Shen
- Breakthrough
  - Artist: Huang Qishan
  - All-round artist: Xu Weizhou
  - Stage performer: Meng Jia
  - Singer-songwriter: ØZI
  - Singer-dancer: Yao Chen
  - International artist: Tablo
  - Group: Power Station
  - Creator: Lil Ghost
  - Artist with most potential: Zhang Yuqi
  - Trending artist: Liu Yu
  - Rising artist: Hailai Amu
- New Power
  - Artist: MIKA
  - Artist with most potential: Rikimaru
  - Most recommended artist: Wang Heye
  - Trending artist: Wang Jingwen
  - Rising artist: Chen Zhuoxuan
  - Singer-songwriter: Cao Yang
  - All-rounder artist: Tang Jiuzhou
- Music Streaming Platforms
  - QQ Music most influential artist: Liu Yu
  - KuGou Music audience's favorite artist: Silence Wang
  - KuWo Music most popular singer-songwriter: Bandun Brothers
  - WeSing song of the year: Shan Yichun
  - Tencent Music rising singer-songwriter: Walter Guan Haode
  - UNI Chart best consecutive champion songs: "Flowers Bloom, Worries Fade" by Zhou Shen & "Meet Yourself" by Yisa Yu & "Hug Me" by Cai Xukun
- Top 10 Songs of the Year
  - "Cage" by Zhang Bichen
  - "Dark Plum Sauce" by Li Ronghao
  - "Meet Yourself" by Yisa Yu
  - "Darwin" by JJ Lin
  - "First Love" by Jane Zhang
  - "The Wind Rises When I Miss You" by Shan Yichun
  - "Cloudy to Sunny, Then Overcast" by Roy Wang
  - "The Farthest View" by Mao Buyi
  - "Suzume" by Zhou Shen
  - "Adoration" by Joker Xue
- Top 10 Hit Songs of the Year
  - "I Will Wait" by Cheng Huan
  - "You, in Your Youth" by Hao Ran (H.R)
  - "Don't Ask" by Zhi Jian Xiao
  - "Listening to Sad Love Songs" by Su Xingjie
  - "Forgot" by Zhou Linfeng
  - "Instant" by Zheng Runze
  - "Listen (DJ A-Zhe Version)" by LF Lu Fei
  - "Children of the West Tower" by Hailai Amu
  - "Flowers Bloom at Parting (Acoustic Version)" by Jiu Shi Nan Fang Kai
  - "A Smile in the Jianghu" by Wen Ren Ting Shu_

=== 6th TMEA, 2025 ===
Below is the list of winners of the 6th TMEA.

- Of the Year
  - Artist: Zhou Shen
  - Most popular artist: Jane Zhang
  - Concert tour: Jolin Tsai's Ugly Beauty World Tour
  - IP: Silence Wang's "100,000 Volts"
  - Special contribution: Khalil Fong
  - R&B artist: Yu Jiayun
  - Rock band: Huichundan
  - Chinese digital album: Shenself by Zhou Shen
  - Chinese digital EP: YUQ1 by Song Yuqi
  - Chinese digital single: "Mona Lisa" by Tan Jianci
  - Film & TV OST albums: The Legend of Jewelry & The Legend of Shen Li
  - Film & TV single: "Shi Shi" by Liu Yuning
- Best Of
  - Mainland, male artist: Silence Wang
  - Mainland, female artist: Yisa Yu
  - Hong Kong/Taiwan, male artist: Jay Chou
  - Hong Kong/Taiwan, female artist: G.E.M.
  - Quality artist: Tia Ray
  - Producer: Silence Wang
  - All-round artist: Tan Jianci
  - Singer-songwriter: Wei Li-an
  - Singer-dancer: Liu Yuxin
  - Rapper: GAI
  - Chinese group: Accusefive
  - Stage performer: Lee Seung-hyun
  - Video game theme song: "Sleepless Night" by Jason Zhang & HOYO-MiX
- Most Influential
  - Mainland, male artist: Zhou Shen
  - Mainland, female artist: Jane Zhang
  - Hong Kong/Taiwan, male artist: Eason Chan
  - Hong Kong/Taiwan, female artist: Jolin Tsai
  - Producer: Sodagreen
  - Quality artist: Lars Huang
  - All-rounder artist: Liu Yuning
  - Singer-songwriter: Wu Qingfeng
  - Singer-dancer: Song Yuqi
  - Rapper: Lan Lao
  - Stage performer: Fiona Sit
  - Chinese group: Sodagreen
  - Video game theme song: "It's Good Like This" by Eason Chan
- New Power
  - Artist: Mooney
  - Chinese group: R.E.D
- Breakthrough
  - Mainland, artist: Liu Yu
  - Hong Kong/Taiwan, artist: MC Cheung
  - Producer: Liu Yuxin
  - Singer-songwriter: Cao Yang
  - Talent-focused artist: Yao Chen
  - Stage performer: MIKA
  - Viral artist: Zhong Chenle
  - All-rounder artist: Pakho Chau
  - Band: Supper Moment
- Music Streaming Platforms
  - QQ Music peak value artist: Tan Jianci
  - QQ Music physical album: Us by Xiao Zhan
  - QQ Music most popular physical album: No Entry Except for Happiness by Lars Huang
  - KuGou Music listeners' favorite artist: G.E.M.
  - KuWo Music folk music artist: Zhang Lei
  - WeSing trending artist: Yisa Yu
  - JOOX highly anticipated rookie group: NexT1DE
- Top 10 Songs of the Year
  - "Little Bliss" by Zhou Shen
  - "Long Days Ahead" by Yisa Yu
  - "The Sea I've Never Seen" by Accusefive
  - "I Miss You So Much" by Sodagreen
  - "The One" by G.E.M.
  - "YOLO" by Liu Yuning
  - "Just Twenty-Three" by Khalil Fong
  - "Hiding the Stars" by Silence Wang
  - "Green Light" by Jane Zhang
  - "Christmas Star" by Jay Chou
- Top 10 Hot Songs of the Year
  - "Flowers Bloom at Parting (Acoustic Version)" by Jiushi Nanfangkai
  - "Echoes of Twilight" by Rent
  - "It’s Not Snow I’m Waiting For (But a Winter With You)" by Zhang Miaoge
  - "When Will the Spring Breeze Come" by Bazahei
  - "You Must Learn to Move Forward" by Ren Xia
  - "Halfway Through Life" by Liu Yangyang
  - "Promise" by Guo Youcai
  - "Be Your Own Light; You Don't Need to Shine Too Brightly" by Shan Yu
  - "Crows Are Black Everywhere" by Xiao Yan Tongxue
  - "Fairy Tale Town" by Xiaoye Laile

=== 7th TMEA, 2026 ===
Below is the list of winners of the 7th TMEA.

- Of the Year
  - Male artist: Zhou Shen
  - Female artist: Jane Zhang
  - Concert tour: Zhou Shen's ShenShen's World Tour
  - Social impact artist: Joker Xue
  - IP: Silence Wang's "Su Long"
  - Producer: Silence Wang
  - Chinese digital album: Havoc in Heaven by Lay Zhang
  - Chinese digital EP: Seasons by Luhan
  - Chinese digital single: "A Moment Within a Moment" by JJ Lin
  - Crossover breakthrough physical album: Black Myth: Wukong Soundtrack
  - Film & TV OST albums: Sunlight and Me & The Legend of Zhanghai & Moonlight Mystique
  - Film & TV singles: "Just Nezha" by Tang Hanxiao & "Beyond the Imperial Court" by Chen Chusheng
  - Original variety show IP: Crush of Music
- Best Of
  - Mainland, male artist: Roy Wang
  - Mainland, female artist: Shan Yichun
  - Hong Kong/Taiwan, male artist: Jeff Chang
  - Hong Kong/Taiwan, female artist: G.E.M.
  - Quality artist: Liu Yuxin
  - All-round artist: Ren Jialun
  - Singer-songwriter: Lil Ghost
  - Singer-dancer: Zhang Xianzi
  - Rapper: GAI
  - Chinese group: TransfOrmProject
  - Stage performer: MC Cheung
  - Video game theme song: "Sacrifice" by G.E.M. & League of Legends
- Most Influential
  - Mainland, male artist: Lars Huang
  - Mainland, female artist: Tia Ray
  - Hong Kong/Taiwan, male artist: JJ Lin
  - Hong Kong/Taiwan, female artist: Jolin Tsai
  - Quality artist: Zhang Xincheng
  - All-rounder artist: William Chan
  - Singer-songwriter: Yan Renzhong
  - Singer-dancer: Ren Jialun
  - Rapper: Tizzy T
  - Stage performer: Liu Yu
  - Chinese group: Teens in Times
  - Video game theme song: "Coordinates of Tomorrow" by JJ Lin
- New Power
  - Artist: Yao Xiaotang
  - All-rounder artist: Shen Jiaren
  - Singer-dancer: Shen Mengyao
  - Chinese group: VIVA
- Breakthrough
  - All-rounder artist: Zhang Junhao
  - Rising artist: Renjun
  - Mainland, artist: Cao Yang
  - Hong Kong/Taiwan, artist: Patrick Brasca
  - Viral artist: Yuan Yiqi
  - Band: Supper Moment
  - Concert: GAI's Theory of Evolution World Tour
- Music Streaming Platforms
  - QQ Music top value group: TransfOrmProject
  - QQ Music x JOOX user-recommended artist: Ren Jialun
  - QQ Music x JOOX heart-captivating artist: Liu Yu
  - QQ Music x JOOX most anticipated artist: Zhang Junhao
  - KuGou Music listener-favorite artist: Liu Yuning
  - KuGou Music heart-captivating artist: Ren Jialun
  - Kuwo Music quality artist: Tia Ray
  - WeSing best album for sing-alongs: Lil Sis by Shan Yichun
  - JOOX recommended crossover influential artist: Zhan Xuan
  - Tencent Music musician-recommended artist: h3R3
  - TMEA x Billboard artist with international influence: Zhou Shen
- Top 10 Songs of the Year
  - "Like a Sunny Day, Like a Rainy Day" by Silence Wang
  - "A Good Wind Rises" by Zhou Shen
  - "Sunset" by Stefanie Sun
  - "Deadman" by Cai Xukun
  - "The Name in This World" by Jeff Chang
  - "Jade" by Shan Yichun
  - "Leap" by Joker Xue
  - "Avalanche" by Roy Wang
  - "Ambitious" by Jane Zhang
  - "Most Beautiful in the World" by Teens in Times
- Top 10 Hot Songs of the Year
  - "Evening Breeze at the Street Corner" by Shan Yu & Guai Shou
  - "Lighter" by Penny
  - "Love Story of the West Tower" by Li Yuanjie & Au
  - "Going Far Away" by Fu Junle
  - "A Regret Called 'Us'" by Tian Yuan
  - "High Mountains and Long Roads" by Quan Yaojiu
  - "57th Cancelled Send" by Princess Feifei
  - "Indoor Track Maker" by Hanser
  - "Seat" by Yu Dongran
  - "Struggles in Ordinary Days" by Xiao Lu
