= Sing! China season 6 =

Sing! China
- Season 6
- Hosted by: Hu Qiaohua; Yi Yi (backstage)
- Coaches: Na Ying (blind auditions); Liao Changyong (cross battles - finals); Wang Feng; Li Ronghao; Hacken Lee
- Winner: Wu Keyue 伍珂玥
- Winning coach: Hacken Lee
- Runner-up: Wang Jingwen 王靖雯

Release
- Original network: Zhejiang Television
- Original release: 30 July – 15 October 2021

Season chronology
- ← Previous; Season 5 Next → Season 7

The sixth season of the Chinese reality talent show Sing! China premiered on 30 July 2021, on Zhejiang Television. Li Ronghao returned as coach for his third consecutive season. Former coach Wang Feng returned to the coaching panel after a four-season hiatus. Na Ying also returned after a one-season hiatus, but only as a coach during the blind auditions and was later replaced by Liao Changyong. They brought along Hacken Lee who is a new coach this season, replacing Li Jian, Nicholas Tse and Chris Li from the previous season.

On 15 October 2021, Wu Keyue was announced the winner of the season, marking Hacken Lee's first win as coach. Wang Jingwen, Chen Wenfei, Yao Xiaotang, and Kazu finished runner-up, third, fourth, and fifth places, respectively. With Keyue's win, she is the first person to receive all turns from coaches in the blind auditions and win the competition. Additionally, for the first time in the show's history, all finalists were female.

== Coaches and hosts ==
Only Li Ronghao returned from the previous season. Li Jian did not return for Season 6, making room for the return of Wang Feng after a four-season hiatus. Na Ying also returned after being absent from the previous season. However, she only participated in the blind auditions, leading to Liao Changyong replacing her afterwards. These coaches were joined by first-time coach Hacken Lee. Therefore, Nicholas Tse and Li Yuchun have been confirmed to leave the show. The host remained the same as last season.

Sing! China season 6 coaches

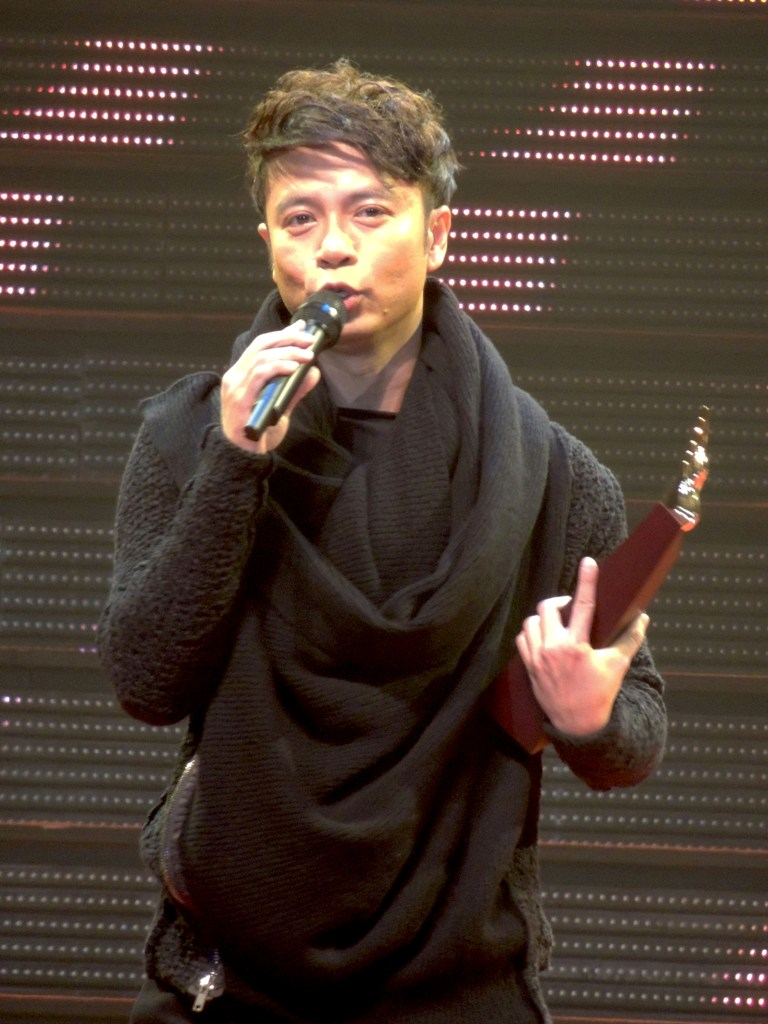
Hacken Lee

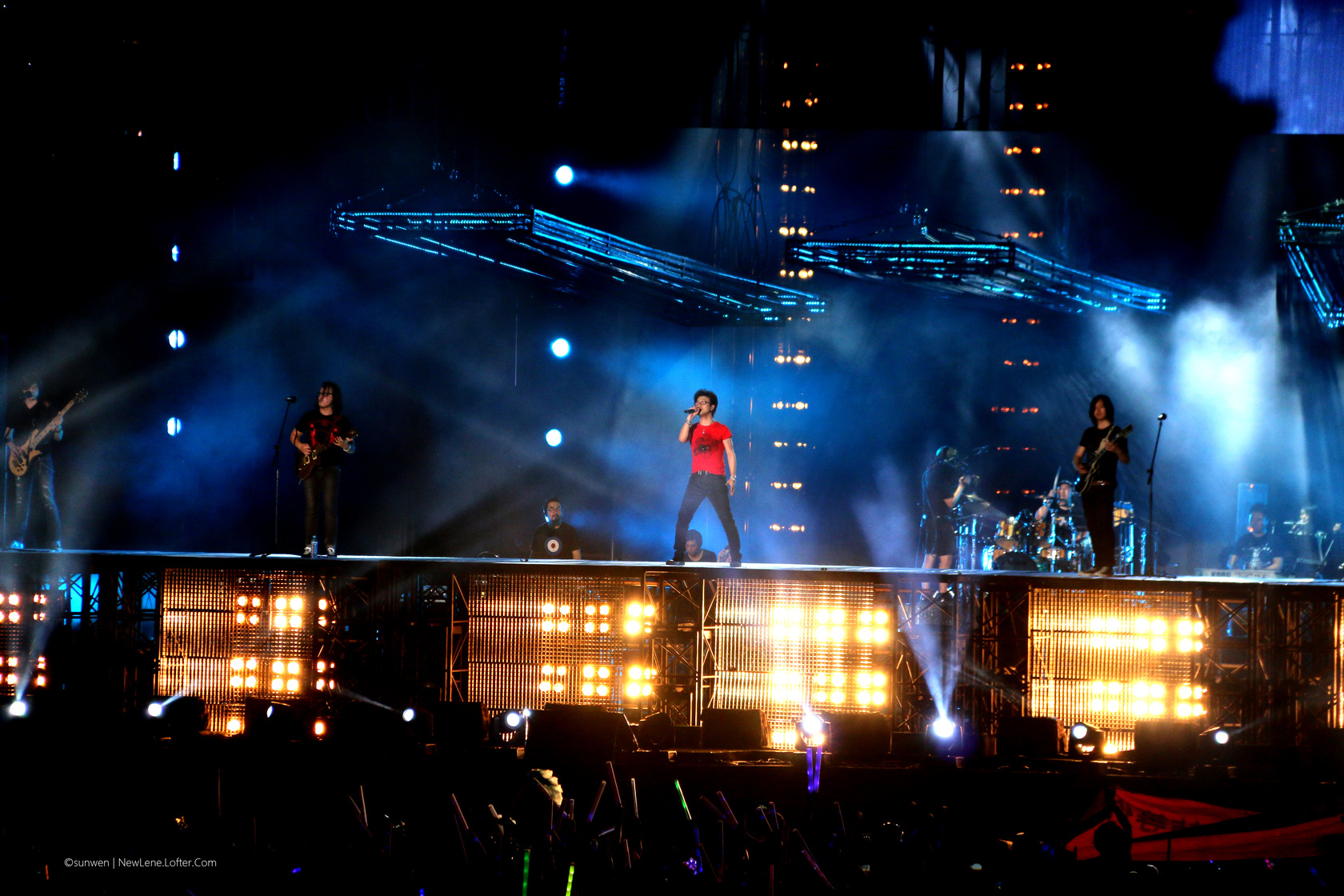
Wang Feng

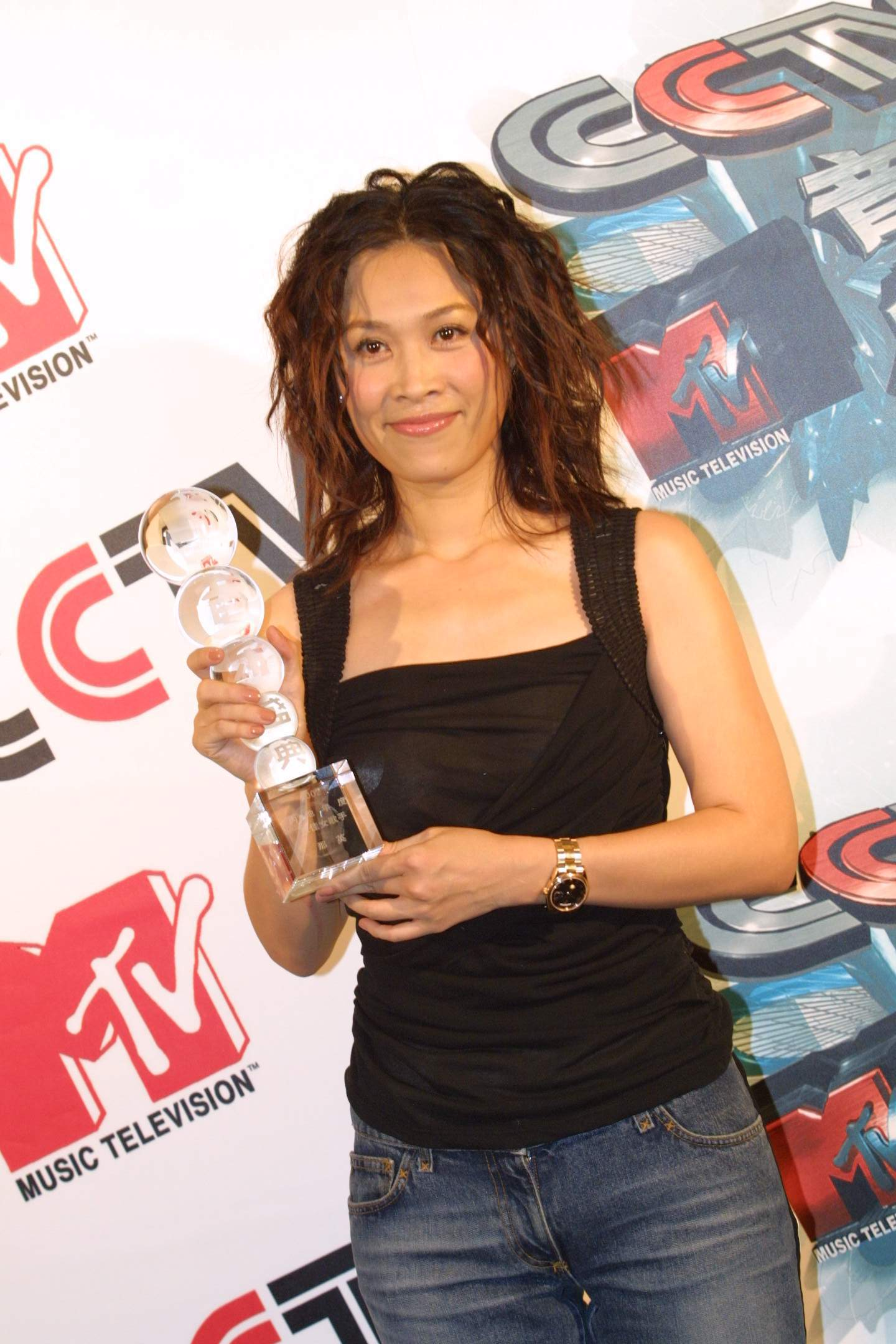
Na Ying (blind auditions)

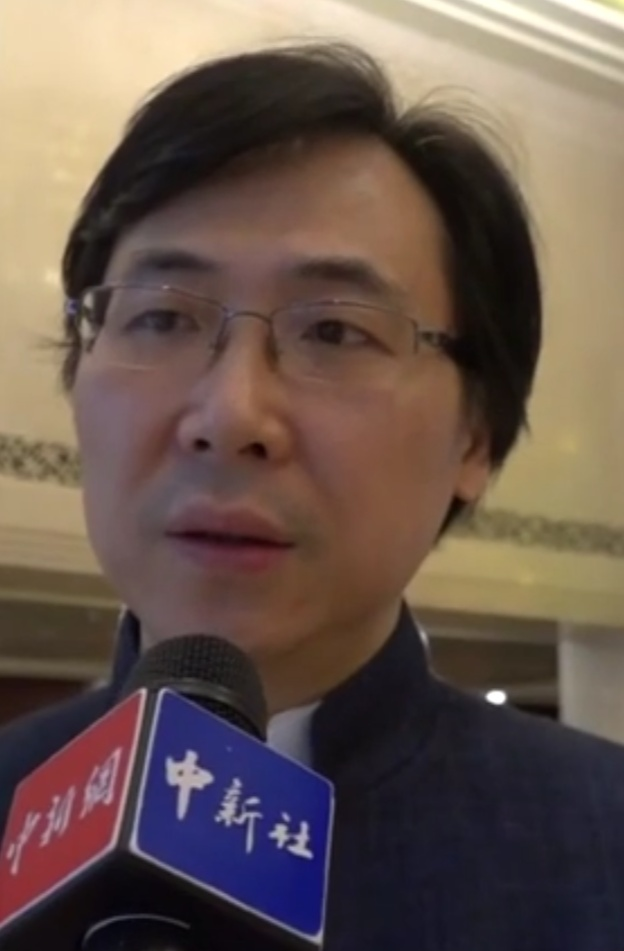
Liao Changyong (cross battles - finals)

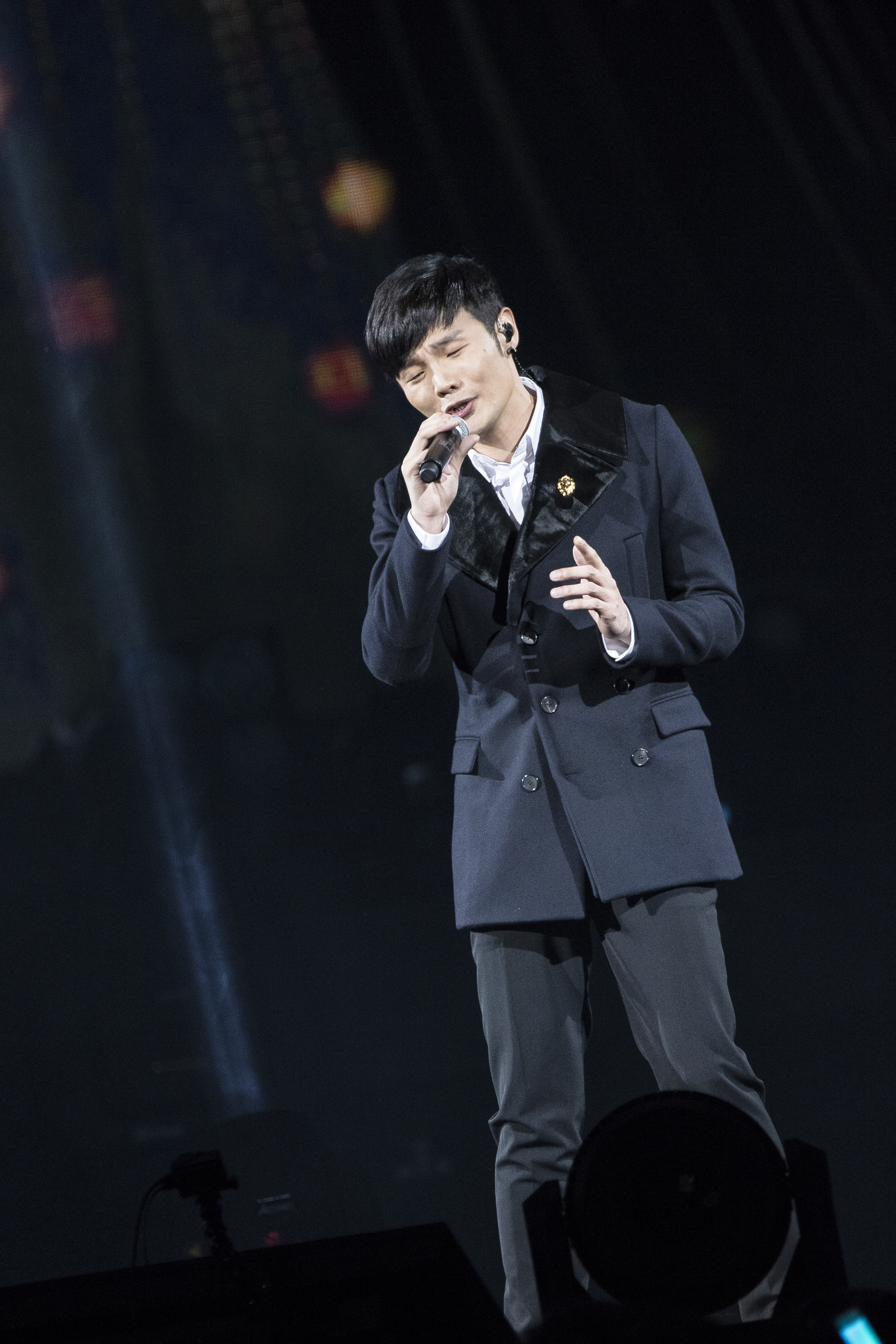
Li Ronghao

== Teams ==
Colour key

- Winner
- Runner-up
- Third place
- Fourth place
- Fifth place
- Eliminated in the Semi-finals
- Eliminated in the Playoffs
- Eliminated in the Cross Knockout rounds
- Eliminated in the Cross Battle rounds
- Saved by other coaches after losing sing-off in the Blind Auditions
- Eliminated in the Blind Auditions

Coaches	Top 34 Artists					
Hacken Lee (with Momo Wu)						
Hacken Lee (with Momo Wu)	Wu Keyue 伍珂玥	Kazu 贺三	Yu Kong 余空	Yang Yaoyang 杨耀扬	Fashion 时尚	Zeng Sushu 曾溯恕
Hacken Lee (with Momo Wu)	~~Wang Jingwen 王靖雯~~	Ran Zaojia 冉皂莢	Zheng Zhihong 鄭智鴻	Andy Su 苏志尹	Pei Chen 裴宸	
Wang Feng (with Huang Xiaoyun)						
Wang Feng (with Huang Xiaoyun)	Yao Xiaotang 姚晓棠	Wang Xin 王馨	Zhuang Yuliang 壯煜亮	Tan Xuanyuan 谭轩辕	step.jad 依加	Mini G 迷你机乐队
Wang Feng (with Huang Xiaoyun)	~~Billy Sun 孙郎朗~~	~~Kazu 贺三~~	Zhang Mei 张玫			
Na Ying (blind auditions) & Liao Changyong (cross battles - finals) (with Zhang Bichen)						
Na Ying (blind auditions) & Liao Changyong (cross battles - finals) (with Zhang Bichen)	Chen Wenfei 陈文非	Zhang Luxin 张露馨	Rob Caiwang 才旺羅布	Clockwork Moon 发条月亮乐队	Master Lee 李炎欣	Teconan 铁柯楠
Na Ying (blind auditions) & Liao Changyong (cross battles - finals) (with Zhang Bichen)	~~Yang Yaoyang 杨耀扬~~	~~Zeng Sushu 曾溯恕~~	Yin Yuke 尹毓恪	Darcy 达西	Zeus Ji 泽宙斯姬	Billy Sun 孙郎朗
Na Ying (blind auditions) & Liao Changyong (cross battles - finals) (with Zhang Bichen)	Fan Qing 凡清					
Li Ronghao (with Jike Junyi)						
Li Ronghao (with Jike Junyi)	Wang Jingwen 王靖雯	Wang Honghao 王泓昊	Yu Zibei 于梓贝	Dong Shuhan 董书含	WeiBird 韦礼安	Jasmine Ren 任媚爽
Li Ronghao (with Jike Junyi)	~~Zeng Sushu 曾溯恕~~	~~Fan Qing 凡清~~				
Note: Italicized names are stolen artists (names struck through within former teams).

== Blind auditions ==
This season introduces teaching assistants. Coaches Na Ying, Wang Feng, Li Ronghao and Hacken Lee will team up with assistants Zhang Bichen, Huang Xiaoyun, Jike Junyi and Momo Wu respectively. Teaching Assistants function like normal coaches. However, when it comes to recruiting contestants, the final decision is up to the coach on whether or not they want the contestant on their team. In other words, the contestant cannot be recruited to their team unless the coach presses their button. If the teaching assistant pressed their button but not their coach counterpart, then the coach has the last 30 seconds to decide if they want the contestant after the song finishes. While there is a 30-second countdown, if the teaching assistant is really impressed by an artist's performance, they can choose to use their Instant Recruit ability. This means that the teaching assistant can press their button again, causing the chair's voice system to say "I WANT YOU" and the respective coach to instantly turn around. This also makes their team available for the artist to choose. However, this action can only be done once per team.

In this stage, the coaches are to recruit a total of six artists to form a team of their own, contrary to five in the previous season. The forming of the teams would move to a format that is similar to the "Six-Chair Challenge" featured in the British version of The X Factor. Once a team is full with six artists occupying all the spots, the subsequent artists which the coach has successfully recruited would have to face-off with one of the six artists in the sing-offs for a spot in the team.

The incoming artist may select any of the six defending artists to compete against in the sing-off, and both artists would each sing a new song and the coach would decide on the winner. The winner would be given the spot in the team. However, continuing from last season, the losing artist has the chance to be saved by other coaches (the same function as the steals from The Voice. The coaches are given 10 seconds to save the losing artist for elimination. If one coach presses their button, he/she will be automatically on the new coach's team and if more than one coach presses, same as with the blind auditions, the artist has the opportunity to choose which coach they want.

For defending artists, once they have won a sing-off against an incoming artist, they would receive immunity from the subsequent sing-offs and immediately advance to the next round of the competition.

Colour key

✔	Coach pressed their button
	Coach's Teaching Assistant used "Instant Recruit Ability"
	Artist defaulted to this coach's team
	Artist elected to join this coach's team
	Artist eliminated with no coach pressing the button
	Artist remained on the team after winning sing-off; immune from subsequent sing-offs
	Artist remained on the team after winning sing-off; replaced a defending artist
	Artist saved by other coaches after losing sing-off
	Artist eliminated after losing sing-off

=== Episode 1 (30 July) ===
The show started with performances from the coaches. Wang Feng performed first, together with Na Ying and former coaches Nicholas Tse and Harlem Yu, performed Yu's "让我一次爱个够", then Li Ronghao, together with former coach Jay Chou performed Na's "默", then Hacken Lee, together with former coaches Eason Chen and Liu Huan, performed Chou's "菊花台", then Na Ying, together with former coach Li Jian, performed Chou's "等你下课", and concluded with the performance of Feng's "我爱你中国", together with the teaching assistants.

Order	Artist	Age	Hometown	Song	Coach's and artist's choices			
Order	Artist	Age	Hometown	Song	Hacken	Feng	Ying	Ronghao
1	step.jad 依加	27	Xinjiang, Urumqi	"都不懂"	✔	✔	✔	✔
2	Wang Jingwen 王靖雯	20	Heilongjiang, Harbin	"忽而今夏"	✔	—	—	—
3	Jasmine Ren 任媚爽	26	Shanxi, Xi'an	"Tiamo"	—	—	✔	✔
4	Sha Nanjie 沙楠杰	27	Liangshan, Sichuan	"等我到日落"	—	—	—	—
5	Wu Keyue 伍珂玥	22	Taishan, Guangdong	"曼珠莎华"	✔	✔	✔	✔
6	Zhang Luxin 张露馨	22	Hubei	"在你的双眼遇见"	✔	—	✔	—

=== Episode 2 (6 August) ===
Order	Artist	Age	Hometown	Song	Coach's and artist's choices			
Order	Artist	Age	Hometown	Song	Hacken	Feng	Ying	Ronghao
1	Clockwork Moon 发条月亮乐队	—	—	"游戏开始"	—	—	✔	—
2	Darcy 达西	27	Chengdu, Sichuan	"作别"	—	—	✔	—
3	Master Lee 李炎欣	26	Shanxi, Xi'an	"实力派"	✔	✔	✔	—
4	Yu Kong 余空	26	Meizhou, Guangdong	"恰好"	✔	—	✔	—
5	Wang Honghao 王泓昊	21	Luojiang District, Deyang, Sichuan	"阿尔茨默的爱"	✔	✔	✔	✔
6	Andy Su 苏志尹	23	Taiwan	"失重的眼泪"	✔	—	✔	—
7	Zeus Ji 澤宙斯姬	26	Ngawa Tibetan and Qiang Autonomous Prefecture, Sichuan	"不鼓自呜"	✔	✔	✔	—
8	Chen Wenfei 陈文非	22	Hefei, Anhui	"出嫁"	—	—	✔	—
9	Yin Yuke 尹毓恪	22	Heilongjiang, Harbin	"寄给睡眠之子的一封信"	—	—	✔	—

=== Episode 3 (13 August) ===
Order	Artist	Age	Hometown	Song	Coach's and artist's choices			
Order	Artist	Age	Hometown	Song	Hacken	Feng	Ying	Ronghao
1	Yao Xiaotang 姚晓棠	22	Shanwei, Guangdong	"不忘"	—	✔	—	—
2	Pei Chen 裴宸	24	Tangshan, Hebei	"不要这样"		—	—	—
3	Ran Zaojia 冉皂莢	25	Shanxi, Xi'an	"茶卡茶卡"	✔	—	—	—
4	Mini G 迷你机乐队	—	—	"三体/COSMOS647"	—	✔	✔	✔
5	Fashion 时尚	27	Shandong	"反正"	✔	—	✔	—
6	Dong Shuhan 董书含	20	Zhoushan, Zhejiang	"天渊之别"	—	—	✔	✔
7	Zheng Zhihong 鄭智鴻	25	Lishui, Zhejiang	"无人知晓"	✔	—	—	—
8	Kazu 贺三	25	Guangyuan, Sichuan	"白象"	—	✔	✔	—

=== Episode 4 (20 August) ===
Order	Artist	Age	Hometown	Song	Coach's and artist's choices			
Order	Artist	Age	Hometown	Song	Hacken	Feng	Ying	Ronghao
1	Zeng Sushu 曾溯恕	19	Yibin, Sichuan	"Somewhere Over The Rainbow"	—	—	—	✔
2	Fan Qing 凡清	19	Beijing	"52 HZ"	✔	—	✔	✔
3	Billy Sun 孙郎朗	25	Beijing	"镀金者"	✔	✔	—	—
4	Wang Xin 王馨	22	Shanxi, Xi'an	"似曾"	—	✔	—	—
5	WeiBird 韦礼安	34	Taiwan	"忽然"	—	—	✔	✔
6	Zhuang Yuliang 壯煜亮	28	Huzhou, Zhejiang	"暖光"	—		—	—
7	Teconan 铁柯楠	24	Luoyang, Henan	"给你的歌"	—	—	✔	—

=== Episode 5 (27 August) ===
Order	Artist	Age	Hometown	Song	Coach's and artist's choices			
Order	Artist	Age	Hometown	Song	Hacken	Feng	Ying	Ronghao
1	Huang He 黄鹤	30	Zhangwu, Liaoning	"大地"	—	—	—	—
2	Tan Xuanyuan 谭轩辕	31	Chongqing	"思念如罪"	✔	✔	✔	—
3	Yang Yaoyang 杨耀扬	22	Chengdu, Sichuan	"对爱渴望"	✔	—	✔	—
4	Zhang Mei 张玫	25	Luoyang, Henan	"赤伶"	—	✔	✔	—

=== Episode 6 (3 September) ===
Order	Artist	Age	Hometown	Song	Coach's and artist's choices			
Order	Artist	Age	Hometown	Song	Hacken	Feng	Ying	Ronghao
1	Du Weilun 杜伟伦	26	Chengdu, Sichuan	"幻想曲"	—	—	—	—
2	Tian Yumeng 田雨萌	26	Chaoyang, Liaoning	"假如我是真的"	—	—	—	—
3	Rob Caiwang 才旺羅布	26	Lhasa, Tibet	"一點點"	—	—	✔	—
4	Yu Zibei 于梓贝	26	Guangzhou, Guangdong	"散场预演"	—	—	—	✔

=== Sing-off details ===
Episode	Order	Song	Incoming artist	Defending artist	Song	Final 6 replacement chart					
Episode	Order	Song	Incoming artist	Defending artist	Song	1	2	3	4	5	6
Team Hacken
First six defending artists						~~Wang Jingwen~~; ~~王靖雯~~	Wu Keyue 伍珂玥	Yu Kong 余空	Andy Su 苏志尹	Pei Chen 裴宸	Ran Zaojia 冉皂莢
3	1	"快尽伤害"	Fashion 时尚	Ran Zaojia 冉皂莢	"重生"	~~Wang Jingwen~~; ~~王靖雯~~	Wu Keyue 伍珂玥	Yu Kong 余空	Andy Su 苏志尹	Pei Chen 裴宸	Fashion 时尚
3	2	"裂心"	Zheng Zhihong 鄭智鴻	Fashion 时尚	"在那么多人之中"	~~Wang Jingwen~~; ~~王靖雯~~	Wu Keyue 伍珂玥	Yu Kong 余空	Andy Su 苏志尹	Pei Chen 裴宸	Fashion 时尚
4	3	"日落大道"	Kazu 贺三	Wang Jingwen 王靖雯 (saved by Li Ronghao)	"受够"	Kazu 贺三	Wu Keyue 伍珂玥	Yu Kong 余空	Andy Su 苏志尹	Pei Chen 裴宸	Fashion 时尚
5	4	"纯金打造"	Yang Yaoyang 杨耀扬	Andy Su 苏志尹	"巴斯光年"	Kazu 贺三	Wu Keyue 伍珂玥	Yu Kong 余空	Yang Yaoyang 杨耀扬	Pei Chen 裴宸	Fashion 时尚
6	5	"Lay Me Down"	Zeng Sushu 曾溯恕	Pei Chen 裴宸	"Stay"	Kazu 贺三	Wu Keyue 伍珂玥	Yu Kong 余空	Yang Yaoyang 杨耀扬	Zeng Sushu 曾溯恕	Fashion 时尚
Team Wang Feng
First six defending artists						step.jad 依加	Yao Xiaotang 姚晓棠	Mini G 迷你机乐队	~~Kazu 贺三~~	~~Billy Sun 孙郎朗~~	Wang Xin 王馨
4	1	"镜子中"	Zhuang Yuliang 壯煜亮	Kazu 贺三 (saved by Hacken)	"生命之光"	step.jad 依加	Yao Xiaotang 姚晓棠	Mini G 迷你机乐队	Zhuang Yuliang 壯煜亮	~~Billy Sun 孙郎朗~~	Wang Xin 王馨
5	2	"无名之路"	Tan Xuanyuan 谭轩辕	Billy Sun 孙郎朗 (saved by Na Ying)	"OKAY"	step.jad 依加	Yao Xiaotang 姚晓棠	Mini G 迷你机乐队	Zhuang Yuliang 壯煜亮	Tan Xuanyuan 谭轩辕	Wang Xin 王馨
6	3	"給你一點顏色"	Zhang Mei 张玫	Zhuang Yuliang 壯煜亮	"自己"	step.jad 依加	Yao Xiaotang 姚晓棠	Mini G 迷你机乐队	Zhuang Yuliang 壯煜亮	Tan Xuanyuan 谭轩辕	Wang Xin 王馨
Team Na Ying
First six defending artists						Zhang Luxin 张露馨	Clockwork Moon 发条月亮乐队	Darcy 达西	Master Lee 李炎欣	Zeus Ji 泽宙斯姬	Chen Wenfei 陈文非
2	1	"和世界和解"	Yin Yuke 尹毓恪	Chen Wenfei 陈文非	"恋爱，俘虏"	Zhang Luxin 张露馨	Clockwork Moon 发条月亮乐队	Darcy 达西	Master Lee 李炎欣	Zeus Ji 泽宙斯姬	Chen Wenfei 陈文非
4	2	"Royals"	Zeng Sushu 曾溯恕	Darcy 达西	"达西I"	Zhang Luxin 张露馨	Clockwork Moon 发条月亮乐队	~~Zeng Sushu~~; ~~曾溯恕~~	Master Lee 李炎欣	Zeus Ji 泽宙斯姬	Chen Wenfei 陈文非
5	3	"姑娘"	Teconan 铁柯楠	Zeus Ji 澤宙斯姬	"离开月球"	Zhang Luxin 张露馨	Clockwork Moon 发条月亮乐队	~~Zeng Sushu~~; ~~曾溯恕~~	Master Lee 李炎欣	Teconan 铁柯楠	Chen Wenfei 陈文非
5	4	"无名人(Nobody)"	Billy Sun 孙郎朗	Master Lee 李炎欣	"霍元甲"	Zhang Luxin 张露馨	Clockwork Moon 发条月亮乐队	~~Zeng Sushu~~; ~~曾溯恕~~	Master Lee 李炎欣	Teconan 铁柯楠	Chen Wenfei 陈文非
5	5	"理由"	Yang Yaoyang 杨耀扬 (saved by Hacken)	Zhang Luxin 张露馨	"U"	Zhang Luxin 张露馨	Clockwork Moon 发条月亮乐队	~~Zeng Sushu~~; ~~曾溯恕~~	Master Lee 李炎欣	Teconan 铁柯楠	Chen Wenfei 陈文非
6	6	"看起來不错其实也还好"	Rob Caiwang 才旺羅布	Zeng Sushu 曾溯恕 (saved by Hacken)	"約會在星期天晚上"	Zhang Luxin 张露馨	Clockwork Moon 发条月亮乐队	Rob Caiwang 才旺羅布	Master Lee 李炎欣	Teconan 铁柯楠	Chen Wenfei 陈文非
6	7	"我的光"	Fan Qing 凡清	Clockwork Moon 发条月亮乐队	"蠢梦"	Zhang Luxin 张露馨	Clockwork Moon 发条月亮乐队	Rob Caiwang 才旺羅布	Master Lee 李炎欣	Teconan 铁柯楠	Chen Wenfei 陈文非
Team Li Ronghao
First six defending artists						Jasmine Ren 任媚爽	Wang Honghao 王泓昊	Dong Shuhan 董书含	~~Zeng Sushu~~; ~~曾溯恕~~	~~Fan Qing~~; ~~凡清~~	WeiBird 韦礼安
4	1	"讨"	Wang Jingwen 王靖雯	Zeng Sushu 曾溯恕 (saved by Na Ying)	"Baby Don't Cry"	Jasmine Ren 任媚爽	Wang Honghao 王泓昊	Dong Shuhan 董书含	Wang Jingwen 王靖雯	~~Fan Qing~~; ~~凡清~~	WeiBird 韦礼安
6	2	"反派"	Yu Zibei 于梓贝	Fan Qing 凡清 (saved by Na Ying)	"不需要"	Jasmine Ren 任媚爽	Wang Honghao 王泓昊	Dong Shuhan 董书含	Wang Jingwen 王靖雯	Yu Zibei 于梓贝	WeiBird 韦礼安

== The Cross Battles ==
In this round, each coach will compete against each other in groups of two. Artists from these respective teams will compete each other in six rounds to decide a winner. The winning artist will receive one point for their team while the other artist will not receive any points. However, if the coach uses the bonus point into the artist and won, the artist will receive two points for their team; otherwise, the artist will not receive any points.

At the end of the episode, the team that achieved a lower score will have to eliminate one artist from their team as a penalty.

After participating in the Blind Auditions this season, Na Ying decided to leave the show and was replaced by Liao Changyong.

Colour key

	Artist won the Cross Battle (one or two points allocated to the team)
	Artist lost the Cross Battle (no points allocated to the team)
	Team won the Cross Battles with highest winning points
✔	Artist received Bonus Points
✘	Artist was eliminated by coach

Episode	Order	Song	Team Ronghao	Result		Team Changyong	Song
Episode	Order	Song	Team Ronghao	4	4	Team Changyong	Song
Episode 7 (10 September)	1	"不用告诉我"	WeiBird 韦礼安	41	12	Zhang Luxin 张露馨	"纵身一跃"
Episode 7 (10 September)	2	"下一个"	Wang Jingwen 王靖雯 ✔	42	11	Teconan 铁柯楠 ✘	"我会等着你"
Episode 7 (10 September)	3	"苏州雪"	Jasmine Ren 任媚爽	11	42	Clockwork Moon 发条月亮乐队 ✔	"天空中的树"
Episode 7 (10 September)	4	"下一个天亮"	Dong Shuhan 董书含	25	28	Chen Wenfei 陈文非	"好不容易"
Episode 7 (10 September)	5	"中毒"	Wang Honghao 王泓昊	25	28	Rob Caiwang 才旺羅布	"Someone You Loved"
Episode 7 (10 September)	6	"是但求其爱"	Yu Zibei 于梓贝	39	14	Master Lee 李炎欣	"Stand Up for What"
Episode 7 (10 September)	Total Points earned by Ronghao's artists：183				Total Points earned by Changyong's artists：135		
Episode 8 (17 September)	Order	Song	Team Feng	Result		Team Hacken	Song
Episode 8 (17 September)	Order	Song	Team Feng	3	5	Team Hacken	Song
Episode 8 (17 September)	1	"小情歌Little Love Song"	Mini G 迷你机乐队 ✘	17	36	Yu Kong 余空 ✔	"星辰大海"
Episode 8 (17 September)	2	"CD盒"	step.jad 依加	40	13	Yang Yaoyang 杨耀扬	"说散就散"
Episode 8 (17 September)	3	"Finally"	Yao Xiaotang 姚晓棠	19	34	Fashion 时尚	"家"
Episode 8 (17 September)	4	"孤岛"	Tan Xuanyuan 谭轩辕 ✔	32	21	Wu Keyue 伍珂玥	"海阔天空"
Episode 8 (17 September)	5	"二三四个字"	Wang Xin 王馨	20	33	Kazu 贺三	"醉"
Episode 8 (17 September)	6	"第一次做人"	Zhuang Yuliang 壯煜亮	10	43	Zeng Sushu 曾溯恕	"You Are the Reason"

== The Cross Knockouts ==
In this round, coaches will draw to determine when they will have the power to choose first. That coach will choose an artist from his team and state which opposing team he wants that artist to face off against. The chosen artist from the representative team will decide his/her opponent by draw as well. Each coach is allowed one block in this round. If a coach used a "Block" on his artist, he/she may not face a certain artist from another team by default. At the end of each Cross Knockout, the two artists will receive votes of approval from a 51-person judging panel. The artist with the most votes will advance to the Playoffs, while the other would be eliminated.

Colour key

Artist won the Cross Knockout and advanced to the Playoffs
Artist lost the Cross Knockout and was eliminated

Episode	Coach	Order	Artist	Song	Panel votes	Result	"Block" result				Blocked artist
Episode	Coach	Order	Artist	Song	Panel votes	Result	Hacken	Feng	Changyong	Ronghao	Blocked artist
Episode 9 (24 September)											
Episode 9 (24 September)	Liao Changyong	1.1	Master Lee 李炎欣	"老李"	24	Eliminated	—N/a	—N/a	—	—N/a	Not selected
Episode 9 (24 September)	Li Ronghao	1.2	Yu Zibei 于梓贝	"先行"	27	Advanced	—N/a	—N/a	—N/a	—	Not selected
Episode 9 (24 September)	Hacken Lee	2.1	Zeng Sushu 曾溯恕	"这世界那么多人"	23	Eliminated	—	—N/a	—N/a	—N/a	Not selected
Episode 9 (24 September)	Liao Changyong	2.2	Zhang Luxin 张露馨	"Interstellar"	28	Advanced	—N/a	—N/a	—	—N/a	Not selected
Episode 9 (24 September)	Li Ronghao	3.1	Wang Jingwen 王靖雯	"唉"	29	Advanced	—N/a	—N/a	—N/a	—	Not selected
Episode 9 (24 September)	Hacken Lee	3.2	Fashion 时尚	"山东的山"	22	Eliminated	—	—N/a	—N/a	—N/a	Not selected
Episode 9 (24 September)	Wang Feng	4.1	Zhuang Yuliang 壯煜亮	"8+8=8"	29	Advanced	—N/a	—	—N/a	—N/a	Not selected
Episode 9 (24 September)	Li Ronghao	4.2	Jasmine Ren 任媚爽	"你"	22	Eliminated	—N/a	—N/a	—N/a	—	Not selected
Episode 9 (24 September)	Liao Changyong	5.1	Chen Wenfei 陈文非	"我们的太阳好好的"	37	Advanced	—N/a	—N/a	—	—N/a	Not selected
Episode 9 (24 September)	Hacken Lee	5.2	Yang Yaoyang 杨耀扬	Feeling Good	14	Eliminated	—	—N/a	—N/a	—N/a	Not selected
Episode 9 (24 September)	Hacken Lee	6.1	Kazu 贺三	I Don’t Want to Miss a Thing	41	Advanced	✔	—N/a	—N/a	—N/a	Rob Caiwang 才旺羅布
Episode 9 (24 September)	Liao Changyong	6.2	Clockwork Moon 发条月亮乐队	"It's Time To Say Goodbye"	10	Eliminated	Block used	—N/a	—N/a	—N/a	Not selected
Episode 10 (1 October)							Block used				
Episode 10 (1 October)	Li Ronghao	1.1	WeiBird 韦礼安	"记得回来"	16	Eliminated	Block used	—N/a	—N/a	—	Not selected
Episode 10 (1 October)	Wang Feng	1.2	Wang Xin 王馨	"玉珍"	35	Advanced	Block used	—	—N/a	—N/a	Not selected
Episode 10 (1 October)	Wang Feng	2.1	Yao Xiaotang 姚晓棠	"晚婚"	29	Advanced	Block used	✔	—N/a	—N/a	Wang Honghao 王泓昊
Episode 10 (1 October)	Li Ronghao	2.2	Dong Shuhan 董书含	"一个人想着一个人"	22	Eliminated	Block used	Block used	—N/a	—	Not selected
Episode 10 (1 October)	Liao Changyong	3.1	Rob Caiwang 才旺羅布	"回家"	7	Eliminated	Block used	Block used	✔	—N/a	Yu Kong 余空
Episode 10 (1 October)	Hacken Lee	3.2	Wu Keyue 伍珂玥	"一生中最爱"	44	Advanced	Block used	Block used	Block used	—N/a	Not selected
Episode 10 (1 October)	Hacken Lee	4.1	Yu Kong 余空	"传奇"	24	Eliminated	Block used	Block used	Block used	—N/a	Not selected
Episode 10 (1 October)	Wang Feng	4.2	Tan Xuanyuan 谭轩辕	"灿烂的你"	27	Advanced	Block used	Block used	Block used	—N/a	Not selected
Episode 10 (1 October)	Li Ronghao	5.1	Wang Honghao 王泓昊	"保留"	32	Advanced	Block used	Block used	Block used	—	Not selected
Episode 10 (1 October)	Wang Feng	5.2	step.jad 依加	"我们的爱情"	19	Eliminated	Block used	Block used	Block used	—N/a	Not selected

== The Playoffs ==
The Top 11 performed in the Playoffs for a spot in the Top 8. The order of appearance of the artists was decided through the drawing of lots by their respective coaches. In deciding who moves on, a professional judging panel made up of 51 veteran record producers, music critics, and media practitioners from various media companies; as well as the studio audience made up of 200 members of the public were given an equal say. Each of the voters was entitled to one vote per artist, and they can either choose to vote or not vote for a particular artist. The maximum score that the student will receive of the professional judging panel review is 51, and 50 for the live audiences, thus having the maximum score of was 101. Eight artists with higher overall scores advanced, while the other three will be eliminated.

Episode	Coach	Order	Artist	Song	Judges' score （out of 51）	Public votes （out of 200）	Total Points	Result
Episode 11 (5 October)	Wang Feng	1	Zhuang Yuliang 壯煜亮	"繁星"	7	72 (18)	25	Eliminated (11th)
Episode 11 (5 October)	Li Ronghao	2	Yu Zibei 于梓贝	"无处不在"	14	95 (23.75)	37.75	Eliminated (10th)
Episode 11 (5 October)	Li Ronghao	3	Wang Honghao 王泓昊	"那个男人"	32	158 (39.5)	71.5	Advanced (6th)
Episode 11 (5 October)	Liao Changyong	4	Zhang Luxin 张露馨	隐隐作秀	38	148 (37)	75	Advanced (5th)
Episode 11 (5 October)	Wang Feng	5	Yao Xiaotang 姚晓棠	"太阳"	51	176 (44)	95	Advanced (1st)
Episode 11 (5 October)	Hacken Lee	6	Kazu 贺三	你就不要想起我	24	165 (41.25)	65.25	Advanced (8th)
Episode 11 (5 October)	Liao Changyong	7	Chen Wenfei 陈文非	"太难唱了"	40	145 (36.25)	76.25	Advanced (4th)
Episode 11 (5 October)	Hacken Lee	8	Wu Keyue 伍珂玥	《假如》／杜麗莎	43	143 (35.75)	78.75	Advanced (3rd)
Episode 11 (5 October)	Li Ronghao	9	Wang Jingwen 王靖雯	"几回"	31	154 (38.5)	69.5	Advanced (7th)
Episode 11 (5 October)	Wang Feng	10	Wang Xin 王馨	"没有你"	46	142 (35.5)	81.5	Advanced (2nd)
Episode 11 (5 October)	Wang Feng	11	Tan Xuanyuan 谭轩辕	"When I see Your Face Again"	10	116 (29)	39	Eliminated (9th)

== The Semi-finals ==
The Top 8 performed in the semi-finals for a slot in the finals. Just like in the playoffs, the order of appearance of the artists was decided through the drawing of lots by their respective coaches. The same voting procedure in the playoffs will be done in the semi-finals: a 51-member professional judging panel, as well as 200-member public. Five artists with higher overall scores will advance to the final, while the other three will be eliminated. With Wang Jingwen and Kazu's advancement to the final, this is the second instance that a stolen artist advanced to the finale. This is also the first time that more than one stolen artist advanced to the finale Coincidentally, this is the second consecutive season that Li Ronghao managed to advance a stolen artist to the finale. Also, with the elimination of Wang Honghao 王泓昊, this is the first time in the show's history where no male singers are represented in the finale.

Episode	Coach	Order	Artist	Song	Judges' score （out of 51）	Public votes （out of 200）	Total Points	Result
Episode 12 (8 October)	Liao Changyong	1	Zhang Luxin 张露馨	"破茧"	25	145 (36.25)	61.25	Eliminated (6th)
Episode 12 (8 October)	Hacken Lee	2	Wu Keyue 伍珂玥	"我等到花儿也谢了"	43	178 (44.5)	87.5	Advanced (1st)
Episode 12 (8 October)	Wang Feng	3	Yao Xiaotang 姚晓棠	"想念拟人化"	44	156 (39)	83	Advanced (3rd)
Episode 12 (8 October)	Li Ronghao	4	Wang Jingwen 王靖雯	"说说话"	45	166 (41.5)	86.5	Advanced (2nd)
Episode 12 (8 October)	Liao Changyong	5	Chen Wenfei 陈文非	"他她回忆录"	34	166 (41.5)	75.5	Advanced (4th)
Episode 12 (8 October)	Hacken Lee	6	Kazu 贺三	"这颗心/等风来"	32	162 (40.5)	72.5	Advanced (5th)
Episode 12 (8 October)	Wang Feng	7	Wang Xin 王馨	"那些花儿"	26	138 (34.5)	60.5	Eliminated (7th)
Episode 12 (8 October)	Li Ronghao	8	Wang Honghao 王泓昊	"放生"	14	148 (37)	51	Eliminated (8th)

== The Finals ==
The top 5 performed for completing the winner of Sing! China! 2021. Just like the last season, they will perform with their coaches and sing the solo song. During their performance, the public will be allowed to vote for them. The winner and 1st runner-up of Round 1 will be advanced to Round 2 (Grand Finale). In Round 2, they will perform their songs first. After both performance finished, they will be facing Panel Votes and Public Votes, where 88 Panel will vote for them and 3,600 audience will vote for them after the panel finished voting. The winner of the Sing! China! 2021 will receive several prizes, and the winning coach will receive a champion title.

Coach	Artist	Round 1 (Finale)					Round 2 (Grand Finale)					Result
Coach	Artist	Order	Duet song (with coach)	Order	Solo song	Public votes	Order	Winner's song	Panel votes (points)	Public points	Total points	Result
Hacken Lee	Kazu 贺三	1	"月半小夜曲"	5	"耶利亞女郎"	1,368	N/A (already eliminated)					Fifth place
Hacken Lee	Wu Keyue 伍珂玥	1	"月半小夜曲"	9	"飄雪"	2,540	11	"最愛"	62	2,231 (61.89)	66.17	Winner
Li Ronghao	Wang Jingwen 王靖雯	2	Melody	6	"以後別做朋友"	2,629	10	"祝賀"	26	1,374 (38.11)	33.83	Runner-up
Liao Changyong	Chen Wenfei 陈文非	3	"父親的草原母親的河"	7	"Bésame mucho"	2,210	N/A (already eliminated)					Third place
Wang Feng	Yao Xiaotang 姚晓棠	4	"當我想你的時候"	8	"一顆星的夜"	2,008	N/A (already eliminated)					Fourth place

== Elimination chart ==
=== Color key ===
Artist's info

- Team Wang Feng
- Team Liao Changyong
- Team Li Ronghao
- Team Hacken Lee

Result details

- Winner
- Runner-up
- Third place
- Fourth place
- Fifth place
- Saved by public
- Eliminated

=== Overall ===
Live concerts' results
Artists	Playoffs	Semi-finals	Finals
Artists	Week 1 Playoffs	Week 2 Semi-finals	Week 3 Finals
Wu Keyue 伍珂玥	Safe	Safe	Winner
Wang Jingwen 王靖雯	Safe	Safe	Runner-up
Chen Wenfei 陈文非	Safe	Safe	Third place
Yao Xiaotang 姚晓棠	Safe	Safe	Fourth place
Kazu 贺三	Safe	Safe	Fifth place
Wang Xin 王馨	Safe	Eliminated	Eliminated (Week 2)
Wang Honghao 王泓昊	Safe	Eliminated	Eliminated (Week 2)
Zhang Luxin 张露馨	Safe	Eliminated	Eliminated (Week 2)
Zhuang Yuliang 壯煜亮	Eliminated	Eliminated (Week 1)	
Yu Zibei 于梓贝	Eliminated	Eliminated (Week 1)	
Tan Xuanyuan 谭轩辕	Eliminated	Eliminated (Week 1)	

== Contestants who appeared on previous seasons or TV shows ==
- Tan Xuanyuan was in Season 4 of the original show The Voice of China and was on Team Harlem, where he landed third place in the Finals.
- Yu Zibei previously appeared in the second season on Team Eason. She was eliminated in the Knockout rounds.
- Huang He was in Season 1 of the original show under Na Ying's team, and was eliminated in the battles
- Step.jad competed in the show Rap for Youth and was part of the Top 34
- Sha Nanjie competed in the third season of Sing My Song under Liu Huan's team, and was eliminated in the battle stage.
- Rob Caiwang was a contestant in the first season of The Coming One, where he placed 9th.
