= Going Dumb =

2021 single by Alesso and Corsak

Single by Alesso and Corsak
- Language: English; Korean
- Released: 19 March 2021
- Genre: Electropop
- Length: 2:48
- Label: Liquid State
- Songwriters: Alessandro Lindblad; Calle Lehmann; Haee (Stray Kids version)
- Producer: Alesso

Alesso singles chronology
"Leave a Little Love" (2021)	"Going Dumb" (2021)	"Chasing Stars" (2021)

Corsak singles chronology
"Evergreen" (2021)	"Going Dumb" (2021)	"Empty Bullets" (2021)

Stray Kids singles chronology
"All In" (2020)	"Going Dumb" (2021)	"Mixtape: Oh" (2021)

Music video
- "Going Dumb" on YouTube

"Going Dumb" is a song by Swedish DJ and record producer Alesso and Chinese musician Corsak. It was released on 19 March 2021 in two versions: one by the two producers, and another with vocals in Korean from K-pop group Stray Kids. The song accompanies the third anniversary of the battle royale game PUBG Mobile, and is featured as background music in the mobile game. It is Stray Kids' first collaboration.

With the song's debut at number 13 on Billboard's Hot Dance/Electronic Songs chart, Forbes noted that Stray Kids became one of the few Korean acts to appear on the chart. A lyric video was released the same day as the song, and a behind-the-scenes music video was released on 8 April 2021, which shows the artists' recording and production process in Seoul, Stockholm and Shanghai. The official music video was released on 7 May.

The remix version by Low Steppa was released on 14 May, and Mike Williams was released on 28 May.

== Track listing ==
- Digital download
1. "Going Dumb" – 2:48
2. "Going Dumb" (with Stray Kids) – 2:49
- Digital download (Low Steppa remix)
1. "Going Dumb" (Low Steppa remix) – 3:17
- Digital download (Mike Williams remix)
1. "Going Dumb" (Mike Williams remix) – 2:46

== Credits and personnel ==
Credits adapted from Tidal.

- Alesso – producer, songwriter
- Corsak – co-producer, vocals
- Stray Kids – vocals (Stray Kids version)
- Calle Lehmann – co-producer, songwriter
- Haee – songwriter (Stray Kids version)

== Charts ==
=== Weekly charts ===
Weekly chart performance for "Going Dumb"
Chart (2021)	Peak position
Hungary (Single Top 40)	27
South Korea Download Chart (Gaon)	178
Spain Digital Song Sales (Billboard)	10
Sweden (Sverigetopplistan)	63
US Hot Dance/Electronic Songs (Billboard)	13

=== Year-end charts ===
Year-end chart performance for "Going Dumb"
Chart (2021)	Position
US Hot Dance/Electronic Songs (Billboard)	46

== Release history ==
Release dates and formats for "Going Dumb"
Region	Date	Format	Version	Label	Ref.
Various	19 March 2021	Digital download; streaming	Original	Liquid State	
Various	14 May 2021	Digital download; streaming	Low Steppa remix	Liquid State	
Various	28 May 2021	Digital download; streaming	Mike Williams remix	Liquid State	
