= Corsak =

Chinese musician

CORSAK 胡梦周
- Born: Hu Mengzhou; January 11, 1989 (age 37); Shanghai, China
- Genres: Mandopop; EDM
- Occupations: Singer; music producer; DJ; actor
- Years active: 2018–present
- Label: Liquid State

Hu Mengzhou (Chinese: 胡梦周, born January 11, 1989), professionally known as Corsak (stylized in all caps), (Note: His name comes from corsac, a fox predominantly found in China.) is a Chinese singer, electronic music producer, and DJ. His debut single "Reverse" (with Ma Yinyin) peaking top 5 on Chinese streaming platforms and frequent collaborations with international artists such as Alan Walker ("Different World", "Sad Sometimes") have cemented him as a rising figure in the electronic music scene.

== Life and career ==
Hu Mengzhou was born in Shanghai on January 11, 1989. He began studying classical piano at the age of three, going on to later graduate from the Shanghai Conservatory of Music with a degree in electronic music production.

In 2011, he auditioned for the second season of China's Got Talent, performing Lady Gaga's "Bad Romance". In 2013, he joined Taiwanese singer Harlem Yu's team on the second season of The Voice of China. In 2014, he was cast in the musical drama "My Youth High Octave" as the second male lead.

In 2018, Corsak became the first Chinese artist to be signed by Liquid State, a record label jointly established by Tencent Music and Sony Music. In May, he released a remix of "That Girl" by Olly Murs, which became the 18th biggest track globally in 2018. In June, he released his first single "Reverse" with Ma Yinyin, marking his official debut. The song hit over 500 million streams across China, peaking in the top 5 of Chinese streaming platforms. In July, he performed at Tomorrowland at the Barong Family Stage. In November, he joined Norwegian DJ Alan Walker, who he had been previously acquainted with at Liquid State, in the production of "Different World", along with K-391 and Sofia Carlson.

In 2019, he released his second single "Glow" with Robinson, based on the French novel, "The Little Prince". In September, he teamed up with Walker once again and fellow Chinese singer Huang Xiaoyun to release "Sad Sometimes". In October, he was named in the Forbes China 30 Under 30 list. In December, he won the "New Power Award" at the 1st Tencent Music Entertainment Awards.

In 2020, he collaborated with the Dutch DJ duo Yellow Claw and Taiwanese singer Julia Wu on "Take Me Back". He released three singles, namely "驰 Timelapse", "Breaking" with Xie Yuchun, and "Flying on Paper" with Liu Yuning.

In 2021, he was awarded the Best Electronic Music Artist Award at the 2nd Tencent Music Entertainment Awards. In March, Corsak and Swedish DJ Alesso released "Going Dumb" to celebrate PUBG Mobile's third anniversary, which was featured as background music in the video game. It was released in two versions, with one version by the two producers and another featuring vocals from K-pop group Stray Kids. The song debuted at number 13 on Billboard's Hot Dance/Electronic Songs chart, where it stayed for 20 weeks. He released four more singles that year, including "Where Do You Think You Are Going" (with Belgian DJ Yves V) and "Back To You" (with Dutch DJ Moti and English singer Georgia Ku).

In 2023, Corsak released his first album titled "一张专辑" (English: "An Album"), consisting of 10 tracks. The album notably included collaborations with Chinese singers Hama ("怂", who he previously worked with on the Chinese version of "Glow"), Miah ("脑"), and M3ssiah ("冬"). In August, he recorded the theme song "烈Fire" for the online tactical first-person shooter game Crossfire's esport with previous collaborator Ma Yinyin.

In 2024, he released his first EP "黑化狐会发挥", featuring an English track ("DigiDark") and three other tracks. In July, he once again won the Best Electronic Music Artist Award at the 5th Tencent Music Entertainment Awards. In November, Corsak was part of the CHINA EDM, Vol. 1 compilation released by Chinese DJ Zhangye, aimed at promoting Chinese electronic dance music.

In 2025, Corsak performed at EDC Thailand.

== Discography ==
=== Albums ===
==== Studio albums ====
List of studio albums, showing selected details
Title	Album details
一张专辑	Released: February 10, 2023; Label: 鲸鱼向海

=== Extended plays ===
List of extended plays with details
Title	EP details
The Villain Fox (黑化狐会发挥)	Released: April 24, 2024; Label: Tencent Music

=== Singles ===
==== As lead artist ====
List of singles as lead artist, showing year released and album name
Title	Year	Album
"Reverse" (with Ma Yinyin)	2018	Non-album singles
"glow" (with HAMA)	2019	Non-album singles
"GLOW" (with Robinson)	2019	Non-album singles
"Way Back Home"	2019	Non-album singles
"Drown"	2019	Non-album singles
"驰 Timelapse"	2020	Non-album singles
"Breaking" (with 谢雨纯)	2020	Non-album singles
"Flying on Paper" (with Liu Yuning)	2020	Non-album singles
"岚 Evergreen"	2021	Non-album singles
"芯 Empty Bullets" (with Ma Yinyin)	2021	Non-album singles
"泊 Anchor"	2021	Non-album singles
"引"	2023	一张专辑
"脑" (with 黄鹤Miah)	2023	一张专辑
"怂" (with HAMA陈缇)	2023	一张专辑
"画"	2023	一张专辑
"墨"	2023	一张专辑
"狂"	2023	一张专辑
"♻"	2023	一张专辑
"零"	2023	一张专辑
"冬" (with M3SSIAH)	2023	一张专辑
"念"	2023	一张专辑
"尘 Blood Blooms" (with 周芷如)	2023	Non-album singles
"DigiDark"	2024	黑化狐会发挥
"藏"	2024	黑化狐会发挥
"OlO"	2024	黑化狐会发挥
"苔"	2024	黑化狐会发挥
"也沒那麼悲傷的歌"	2024	Non-album singles
"皮箱"	2024	Non-album singles
"渴 (Desire)"	2024	CHINA EDM, Vol. 1
"123"	2025	Non-album single
"Reed Whistle" (with Slushii and Reed)	2026	Non-album single

==== Promotional singles ====
List of promotional singles, showing year released and notes
Title	Year	Notes
"暮 Passage" (with Ma Yinyin)	2023	Sky: Children of the Light promo track
"烈Fire" (with Ma Yinyin)	2023	Crossfire esports theme song

==== As featured artist ====
List of singles as featured artist, showing year released and album name
Title	Year	Album
"Different World" (Alan Walker featuring K-391, Sofia Carson & CORSAK)	2018	
"Take Me Back" (Yellow Claw featuring CORSAK and Julia Wu)	2020	Non-album single
"Going Dumb" (Alesso featuring CORSAK)	2021	Going Dumb
"Going Dumb (with Stray Kids)" (Alesso featuring CORSAK and Stray Kids)	2021	Going Dumb
"Where Do You Think You Are Going" (Yves V featuring CORSAK and Leony)	2021	Non-album single
"Back To You" (MOTi featuring CORSAK and Georgia Ku)	2021	Non-album single
"justdance!" (2z2 featuring CORSAK)	2025	Non-album single

=== Remixes ===
List of remixes, showing year released and original artist(s)
Title	Year	Original artist(s)
"Am I The Only One" (CORSAK Remix)	2020	R3hab (featuring Astrid S and Hrvy)
"色香水" (CORSAK Remix)	2021	Yoh Kamiyama
"September" (CORSAK Remix)	2021	James Arthur
"Hearts on Fire" (CORSAK & Willim Remix)	2021	Illenium and Dabin (featuring Lights)

== Filmography ==
=== Television series ===
Year	English title	Original title	Role	Notes
2014	My Youth High Eight Degrees	我的青春高八度	Li Yiyuan	Second male lead, episode 7

=== Television show ===
Year	English title	Original title	Role	Notes
2012	China's Got Talent series 2	中国达人秀	Himself	Contestant
2013	The Voice of China season 2	中国好声音	Himself	Contestant, on Harlem Yu's team
2020	Me to Us	我们的乐队	Himself	Contestant
2021	The Flash Band	闪光的乐队	Himself	Contestant
2022	The Treasured Voice season 3	天赐的声音 第三季	Himself	Guest, episode 7
2023	Rising Land season 2	朝阳打歌中心 第二季	Himself	Guest, episodes 5 and 6
2024	Melody Journey	音乐缘计划	Himself	Guest, episode 3

== Awards ==
Award ceremony	Year	Category	Nominee	Result	Ref
1st Tencent Music Entertainment Awards	2019	New Power Award	CORSAK	Won	
2nd Tencent Music Entertainment Awards	2021	Best Electronic Music Artist	CORSAK	Won	
5th Tencent Music Entertainment Awards	2024	Best Electronic Music Artist	CORSAK	Won	
