= Tsewang Norbu =

Tibetan singer (1996–2022)

- Born: 9 October 1996; Nagqu, Tibetan Autonomous Region, China
- Died: 25 February 2022 (aged 25); Lhasa, Tibetan Autonomous Region, China
- Cause of death: Self-immolation
- Occupation: Singer
- Years active: 2014–2022

Tibetan name
- Tibetan: ཚེ་དབང་ནོར་བུ་
Transcriptions
- Wylie: Tshe-dbang Nor-bu
- THL: Tséwang Norbu
- Tibetan Pinyin: Cêtpang Norpu

Chinese name
- Simplified Chinese: 才旺罗布
- Traditional Chinese: 才旺羅布
Transcriptions
Standard Mandarin
- Hanyu Pinyin: Cáiwàng Luóbù

Tsewang Norbu (Tibetan: ཚེ་དབང་ནོར་བུ་; Chinese: 才旺罗布; 9 October 1996 – 25 February 2022) was a Tibetan singer who performed in Tibetan, Mandarin Chinese, and English. He rose to national prominence in China through his performances in various variety shows.

On 25 February 2022, Norbu lit himself on fire outside the Potala Palace, the former residence of the Dalai Lama.

== Early life ==
Norbu was born on 1996 in Nagqu. Both his parents were musicians, which led him to have an interest in music from a young age. Norbu attended and graduated from Tibet University.

His uncle Sogkhar Lodoe is a political prisoner.

== Music career ==
In 2014, Norbu participated in the music variety show Road to Star, produced by Guangdong Satellite TV. In the show, he played piano and sang Tibetan songs, reaching the top twelve in the Western Division and top forty-eight in the country. He later left the competition and declined an invitation to participate in the music variety show The Voice of China, at the time produced by Zhejiang Satellite TV.

In 2017, Norbu participated in the Tencent Video music variety show The Coming One, where he joined Li Ronghao's team and eventually reached ninth place in the national finals. In 2019, he took part in the music variety show Let's Band Together, produced by Youku; he was eliminated halfway.

Norbu was involved in multiple music variety shows in 2021. He participated in the CCTV-3 variety show Spring Festival Gala and performed the song "Under the Cloud" with singer Mimi Lee. On 11 June, he performed at the awards ceremony of the 24th Shanghai International Film Festival as an honored guest. He later took part in Sichuan TV's Tibetan cultural program Handsome Tibetan Youth, as well as the sixth season of the reality show Sing! China. Near the end of the year, he joined singer Na Ying's team on The Voice of China, but they were eliminated among the top twenty-two contestants.

== Self-immolation and death ==
Norbu died on 25 February 2022 by self-immolation, after having set fire to himself outside the Potala Palace in Lhasa. He was the 158th Tibetan to die in this manner since 2009. Initial sources stated that a Tibetan man shouted slogans outside the palace that morning and tried to set himself on fire, but he was stopped by the local police and then taken away by the authorities. The identity, status, and whereabouts of the individual were unknown at the time. After the incident, the local police blocked the roads around Potala Palace, and the authorities dispatched more soldiers to the location.

On 4 March 2022, sources outside China confirmed through local records that the self-immolator was Norbu and that he had died at the age of 25; the date and place of his death could not be immediately confirmed, however. Norbu's Weibo and Douyin accounts were filled with large numbers of condolence messages and as a result, the comment function on both apps was disabled for Norbu's accounts. His last Weibo post, written on the day of his death, expressed gratitude to his fans for their comments and messages about his most recent song. Norbu's songs were removed from music platforms in mainland China. News regarding his self-immolation has been suppressed by Chinese authorities, and his biography articles on the Chinese online encyclopedias Baike Baidu and Sogou Baike do not mention any information regarding his death.

Kelsang Gyaltsen Bawa, the Central Tibetan Administration's representative in Taiwan, pointed out that the cause of Norbu's death was suspicious and called on the international community to intervene in the investigation of Norbu's self-immolation.

Voice of America's Tibetan channel reported in May 2022 that Norbu's father, Choegyen, committed suicide after being threatened and harassed by the Chinese police.

== Personal life ==
Norbu was married and had a daughter.

== Discography ==
=== Tibetan ===
- "Dress" (གཟབ་སྤྲོས།) (2018)
- "Secret" (གསང་བ།) (2018)
- "Tsampa" (རྩམ་པ།) (2018)
- "Let's Break Up" (2019)
- "Looking Toward the Changthang" (བྱང་ཐང་བལྟ་བའི་མིག) (2019)
- "Dance Floor" (2019)
- "Except You" (རང་མ་གཏོགས།) (2019)
- "Young" (ལང་ཚོའི་དཔལ།) (2019)
- "Ganglha Metok" (2020)
- "Sorry Seems to Be the Hardest Word" (2020)
- "Returning Home" (ཡུལ་ལ་ལོག) (2021)

=== Chinese ===
- "Forever Love" (永远的爱) (2020)
- "Magic" (魔法) (2020)
- "Under the Cloud" (飞云之下) (2021)
