= Supper Moment =

Band from Hong Kong

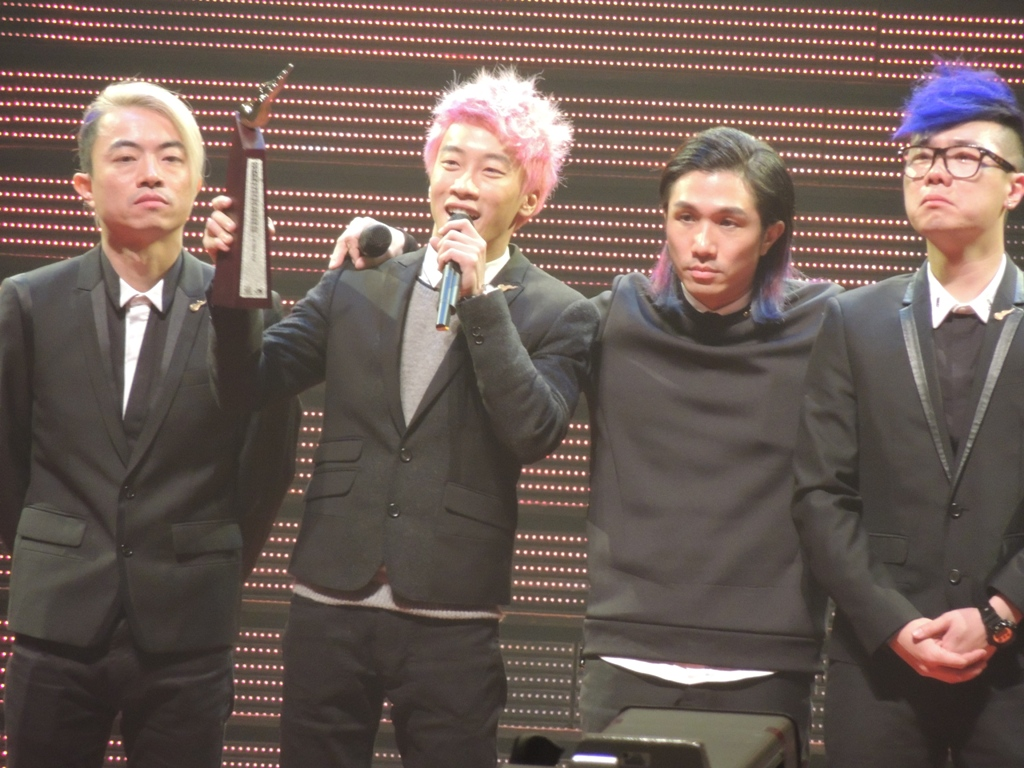
- Supper Moment - Ultimate Song Chart Awards 2013

Background information
- Origin: Hong Kong
- Genres: Pop rock
- Years active: 2006–present
- Label: Redline Music (2010–present)
- Members: Sunny (lead vocals, guitar); Martin (guitar); CK (bass guitar); Hugh (drums)
- Website: www.facebook.com/suppermoment

Supper Moment is a four-member rock band from Hong Kong. They were formed in 2006 and officially debuted in 2010 under Redline Music.

== Members ==
They consist of lead vocalist and guitarist Sunny (Chinese: 陳仕燊; Jyutping: can^{4} si^{6} san^{1}), lead guitarist Martin (梁燿鵬; loeng^{4} jiu^{6} paang^{4}), bass guitarist CK (張祖光; zoeng^{1} zou^{2} gwong^{1}) and drummer Hugh (陳鴻達; can^{4} hung^{4} taat^{3}; also: Tat).

== Discography ==
=== Albums ===
Album name	Album type	Record label	Release date	Track listing	Source
等等...	EP	Redline Music	6/8/2010	1. Intro; 2. Supper Moment; 3. 最後晚餐; 4. 話別空氣; 5. 白雲說; 6. 對岸對望 (Mandarin)	
旅程	EP	Redline Music	24/11/2010	1. 里程; 2. 小行星 (Mandarin); 3. P.S. I Love You; 4. 今天開始單調了; 5. Love Song; 6. ...等等	
再次心跳	Album	Redline Music	6/8/2011	1. 點滴; 2. Dance In The Rain; 3. 是你令我再次找到心跳; 4. 向孩子說愛情; 5. 今夜酒氣吹過; 6. 最安靜的時候; 7. 懂得快樂; 8. 尋回一碗湯; 9. 肥皂泡; 10. Goodnight City	
小伙子出城記	EP	Redline Music	25/11/2012	1. 小伙子; 2. 很久沒擁抱; 3. 纏繞 (Mandarin); 4. 過後 (Mandarin); 5. 飛	
世界變了樣	Album	Redline Music	16/5/2014	1. We Are Colorful; 2. 請講; 3. 無盡; 4. 浪人; 5. 機械人; 6. Interlude; 7. 臉皮; 8. 世界變了樣; 9. 有你有我	
The Moment	EP	Redline Music	31/1/2016	1. 討厭的我; 2. 煩擾中起舞; 3. 孤獨先生; 4. 風箏; 5. 幸福之歌	
Dal segno	Album	Redline Music	13/4/2018	1. 258 km/h 2. 一樣不一樣; 3. 靈感床; 4. 同一; 5. 不要死在崇拜裡; 6. 大丈夫; 7. 橙海; 8. 全世界暫停; 9. 說再見了吧; 10. 最後晚餐 (Acoustic version) (hidden track)	
無盡	Mandarin album	Redline Music	2/8/2019	1. 一樣不一樣; 2. 大丈夫; 3. 幸福之歌; 4. 靈感床; 5. 風箏; 6. 飛 7. 橙海; 8. 過後; 9. 世界變了樣; 10. 無盡 (粵)	
19 Moment	Rearranged album	Redline Music	19/1/2020	CD1: 1. 最後晚餐(2019); 2. 對岸對望(2019); 3. PS I Love You(2019); 4. Love Song(2019); 5. 等等...(2019); 6. 點滴(2019); 7. 是你令我再次找到心跳 (2019); 8. 今夜酒氣吹過(2019); 9. 最安靜的時候(2019); 10. 懂得快樂(2019); CD2: 1. 尋回一碗湯(2019); 2. 肥皂泡(2019); 3. Goodnight City(2019); 4. 月亮代表我受了傷的心(2019); 5. 很久沒擁抱(2019); 6. 有你有我(2019); 7. 沙燕之歌(2019); 8. 撼動; 9. LOVE is NEARBY(Bonus Track)	

== Concerts and mini shows ==
1. 等等... CD Release Show
2. 旅程 CD Release Show
3. Supper Moment @ Live Stage Langham Place
4. 起動心跳 Live
5. 再次心跳 Concert (same name as their third album)
6. Supper Moment @ Fullcupmusic Cafe
7. Supper Moment x Neway Music Live
8. 小伙子出城記 autograph signing party
9. 世界變了樣 Concert (same name as their fifth album)
10. Redline Music 5th Anniversary Party
11. 世界變了樣 China tour
12. 世界變了樣 Home station
13. Superjoy Live 2015
14. Time Out Hong Kong's Big Night Out
15. HMV x MOOV Supper Moment Alive on Stage
16. 溫柔革命10th Anniversary Concert
17. Supper Moment London Live 2017
18. Supper Moment 【dal segno】CD release show
19. Supper Moment Live 2018 at Hong Kong Coliseum
20. Supper Moment Live 2019 in Macao and Foshan
21. Supper Moment x Miriam Lam MOOV Live 2019
22. Supper Moment Live 2020 in Vancouvor and Toronto

== Chart performance ==
Supper Moment has topped major charts in Hong Kong many times. 過後 was their first song to achieve number 1, topping the 903 chart in week 1 of 2013. 無盡 repeated the feat in week 38 of 2013, and 世界變了樣 topped the RTHK chart in week 52 of 2013. By the end of 2017, 大丈夫 was Supper Moment's first song to top all four major charts in Hong Kong.

== Awards ==
- Year 2008 : Soundbase Festival 2008 Acoustic Band Competition (Gold Prize)
- Year 2009 : A-Space Our Rock Story 5 Band Competition ( Champion, Best Vocal, Best Drummer and Best Original Song Award)
- Year 2010 : 「伊維特樂樂園」"hea爆華山Simple Life" Original Song Competition ( 1st runner-up)
- Year 2013 : 2013 CASH Golden Sail Music Awards ( Best Performance by a Band (機械人))
- Year 2013 : 2013 Ultimate Song Chart Awards Presentation (Ultimate Group - Silver)
- Year 2014 : 36th Top Ten Chinese Gold Songs Award Concert (Best Improvement Award - Gold)
- Year 2014 : 2014 CASH Golden Sail Music Awards (Best Melody (無盡))
- Year 2014 : 15th Chinese Music Media Award (Cantonese Song (世界變了樣))
- Year 2015 : 2015 CASH Golden Sail Music Awards ( Best Performance by a Band (幸福之歌))
- Year 2015 : 2015 CASH Golden Sail Music Awards (6th Koo Kar Fai New Generation Music Award)
- Year 2015 : 2015 Jade Solid Gold Best Ten Music Awards Presentation (Best Performance Award - Gold)
- Year 2015 : 2015 Jade Solid Gold Best Ten Music Awards Presentation (Best Band - Silver)
- Year 2016 : 2015 Ultimate Song Chart Awards Presentation (Ultimate Top Ten Songs - 10th (幸福之歌))
- Year 2016 : 2015 Ultimate Song Chart Awards Presentation (Ultimate Group - Gold)
- Year 2016 : 2015 Ultimate Song Chart Awards Presentation (Ultimate My Favourite Group)
- Year 2016 : 38th Top Ten Chinese Gold Songs Award Concert (Best band/Group Award - Gold)
