= Yao Xiaotang =

Chinese singer

- Born: 11 September 1998 (age 28); Shanwei, Guangzhou, Guangdong, China
- Education: Central Academy of Drama
- Occupations: Singer; actress
- Musical career
- Genres: Mandopop; Ballad
- Instrument: Vocals
- Years active: 2020–present
- Label: By Moon Entertainment

Chinese name
- Traditional Chinese: 姚曉棠
- Simplified Chinese: 姚晓棠
- Hanyu Pinyin: Yáo Xiǎotáng
- Jyutping: Jiu4 Hiu2tong4

Yao Xiaotang (Chinese: 姚晓棠, born 11 September 1998) is a Chinese singer and actress. She is noted for finishing fourth on season 6 of the Chinese reality talent show Sing! China.

== Early life ==
Xiaotang was born on September 11, 1998, in Shanwei, Guangdong, Guangzhou, China. She graduated from Central Academy of Drama.

== Discography ==
=== Extended plays ===
Title	Album details	Sales
獨處症	Released: July 3, 2023; Label: By Moon Entertainment; Formats: Digital download, streaming; Track listing: 1. 無能為力; 2. 我想你了; 3. 人为; 4. 她的樹	—N/a

=== Singles ===
Year	Title	Album
2020	假如云飞去	Non-album singles
2020	再会有期	Non-album singles
2021	短暂的爱过	Non-album singles
2021	假象	Non-album singles
2022	问酒	Mirror: A Tale of Twin Cities OST Part 8
2022	Out of Love	Love Unexpected OST Part 5
2022	暮云霄	Non-album singles
2022	今天我决定离开你	Non-album singles
2022	敏感话题	Non-album singles
2023	卿卿	Fairyland Romance OST Part 3
2023	不知所措	Non-album singles
2023	已经有我啦	Non-album singles
2023	花束般的恋爱	Non-album singles
2024	上官婉儿	Non-album singles
2024	双梦	The Princess Royal OST Part 7
2024	只如处见	The Young Brewmaster's Adventure OST Part 2
2024	薄荷夏天	Non-album singles
2024	会开花的云	Non-album singles
2024	最是人間	Are You the One OST Part 3
2024	关于你	Non-album singles
2024	失	Non-album singles
2025	深爱	Non-album singles
2025	泪念	Kill My Sins OST Part 4
2025	座位	Cover Single
2025	偏方	Single
2025	女孩，女孩！	Single
2025	愿	OST Single
2025	现在就要见你	破晓 Album
2025	土味情话	破晓 Album
2025	一天世界	破晓 Album
2025	重	破晓 Album
2025	月姑姑	破晓 Album
2025	更接近海	破晓 Album
2026	鱼缸	破晓 Album
2026	面对面想念	破晓 Album
2026	你笑起来	破晓 Album
2026	连带保证人	破晓 Album
2026	一万公里的思念	破晓 Album
2026	忘了吗忘了吧	Single Duet 开始奏乐开始舞 Variety Show

== Filmography ==
=== Film ===
Year	English title	Original title	Role	Notes	Ref.
2022	Mr. No Problem	奇妙能力哥	Lu Fei	Main role	
2024	The Dream of Red Mansions	红楼梦之金玉良缘	Jia Tanchun	Supporting role	

=== Television series ===
Year	English title	Chinese title	Role	Network	Ref.
2024	Orange Soda	橘子汽水	Tang Qing	Tencent Video	

=== Television shows ===
Year	Title	Network	Role	Notes	Ref.
2020	Sing or Spin	Hunan Television	Cast member		
2021	Sing! China	Zhejiang Television	Contestant	Finished fourth	
2024	The Treasured Voice 5	Zhejiang Television	Cast member	Entire Season	
2024	Melody Journey	JSBC	Cast member	Episode 9 and 10	
2025	The Treasured Voice 6	Zhejiang Television	Cast member	Entire Season	
2026	The Treasured Voice 7	Zhejiang Television	Cast member	Episodes 1–6, 8, and 10–12	
2026	国乐无双	CCTV-6 and Zhejiang Satellite TV	Cast member	Episode 12	
2026	音你而来 Season 3	江苏卫视 (Jiangsu Satellite TV)	Cast member	Entire Season	
2026	开始奏乐开始舞	东方卫视（Dragon TV）与优酷（Youku）	Cast member	Episode 2	
