= Desperation =

Desperation may refer to:

- Despair
- Panic
- Desperation (novel), a 1996 Stephen King novel set in the fictional town of Desperation, Nevada
- Stephen King's Desperation (film), a 2006 TV movie based on King's novel
- Desperation (sculpture), an 1899/1900 work by Auguste Rodin
- Desperation (Desperation Band album), 2003
- Desperation (Hostyle Gospel album), 2013
- Desperation (Oblivians album), by Oblivians, 2013
- Desperation Records, a record label by Barenaked Ladies
- Omorashi, a fetishism sometimes referred to in the Western world as "desperation fetishism"
- "Desperation", a song by Steppenwolf from their debut album Steppenwolf, later covered by Humble Pie for their debut album As Safe as Yesterday Is

== See also ==
- Desperate (disambiguation)
