= Disrepair =

Disrepair may refer to:

- Disrepair (album), 1997 studio album by LUXT

== See also ==
- Repair
- Despair (disambiguation)
