= Despair (disambiguation) =

Despair is a state of depressed mood and hopelessness.

Despair may also refer to:

- Despair (sculpture), a c. 1890 sculpture by Auguste Rodin
- Despair (novel), a 1936 novel by Vladimir Nabokov
  - Despair (film), a 1978 film adaptation by Rainer Fassbinder
- Despair, a 1969 underground comic by Robert Crumb
- Despair (DC Comics), a character in the Sandman comic book series
- Giant Despair, a character in The Pilgrim's Progress by John Bunyan
- Despair, Inc., a company that makes satirical posters and souvenirs
- Despair (band), a thrash metal band
- Despair (album), an album by Omar Rodríguez-López
- "Despair", a song by the Yeah Yeah Yeahs from their studio album Mosquito, 2013
- Neka mi ne svane, Croatian Eurovision Song Contest entry from 1998, also known as "Despair".
- Mount Despair (disambiguation), several mountains

== See also ==
- Diseases of despair
- Desperate (disambiguation)
