= Joanna Dong =

- Born: Dong Ziyan, Joanna; 15 November 1981 (age 45); Singapore
- Occupations: Singer, host, actress
- Years active: 2004–present
- Spouse: Zachary Ho (m. 2012)

Chinese name
- Traditional Chinese: 董姿彥
- Simplified Chinese: 董姿彦
Transcriptions
Standard Mandarin
- Hanyu Pinyin: Dǒng Zīyàn
- Musical career
- Origin: Singapore
- Genres: Folk jazz Jazz; Bossa nova Mandopop
- Labels: Red Roof Records; H.I.M Music
- Website: joannadong.com

Joanna Dong Ziyan (Chinese: 董姿彦; born 15 November 1981 in Singapore) is a Singaporean singer, actress and host. Primarily a jazz vocalist, she is the first artiste signed to Singapore label, Red Roof Records.

== Early life and education ==
The only child of divorced parents, her initial forays into the world of entertainment came in the 1980s when her mother, a former Chinese teacher, started entering her into karaoke competitions, many of which she won. After attending Raffles Girls' School and Victoria Junior College, she graduated from the National University of Singapore with honours in sociology.

== Career ==
=== Music ===
She first came into the public eye when she joined the first-ever Singapore Idol competition in 2004 and reached the Top 40. Six months after exiting the talent competition, Joanna began pursuing a music career in earnest, landing her first regular singing gig in The Courtyard at Raffles Hotel. A featured performer with major local groups such as the Singapore Symphony Orchestra, JASSO and Dingyi, she is well-regarded by music industry peers.

Dong released her EP, ‘Lullaby Nomad’, in 2008, which launched with a concert at the Esplanade Recital Studio. She also collaborated with Brazilian all-stars band, Bossa Negra, to release a single of her Mandarin translation of popular bossa nova standard ‘Summer Samba’ in 2010. She also performs with her own project bands. She has rearranged Hokkien songs in a contemporary jazz style with Peace Kopitiam Jazz Band (2012 – 2014) and reworked dirty lyrics into Christmas ditties with alternative Christmas band, Naughty “Noor” Nice (2010 – 2015). In 2015, Dong collaborated with fellow Singapore Idol, Sezairi Sezali, on the first Mandarin and Malay pop track, ‘Starlight’, for Sing, Love, a SG50 musical project by Red Roof Records.

In July 2017, Dong appeared under the spotlight again as the first of five Singapore entrants to audition for the second season of Sing! China, in which she sang a jazz arrangement of Lo Ta-yu's classic Love Song 1990, and joined Team Jay alongside fellow Singaporean, and teammate Olinda Cho. She then became the second Singaporean after Nathan Hartono to make it to the finals, after having defeated Cho the episode before that aired 29 September.

She put up a strong solo performance of Fong Fei-fei's When I Hear Applause (likewise in a jazz arrangement) and emerged second runner-up in the finals held at the Beijing National Stadium on October 8, 2017, losing out to Guo Qin of Team Na Ying and Team Liu Huan member Zhaxipingcuo of Tibet. Her third-place finish is the second best achievement in the show by Singapore thus far (behind Hartono). Nonetheless, she has expressed that she is now more confident of pursuing a singing career.

In 2023, Dong performed at the National Day Concert held jointly by Gardens by the Bay and Mediacorp.

=== Theatre ===
Apart from singing, Dong, who took theatre studies at Victoria Junior College, also expressed herself on stage in various theatre productions from 1998. In 2007, she landed the principal role of Rose in If There’re Seasons..., a musical based on the music of Xinyao pioneer, Liang Wen Fook, and won Best Supporting Actress in the ST Life! Theatre Awards for her performance. She would reprise the role in 2009 and 2014 re-runs. In 2008, she played leads in Mandarin comedy, The Soldier and his Virtuous Wife and Tan Kheng Hua's raunchy directorial debut, Do Not Disturb – Late Checkout Please. In 2010, she was lead actress in the period rock musical, Liao Zhai Rocks!, inspired by colourful Qing dynasty folk stories. In 2011, Dong took on the lead of Small Papaya in Goh Boon Teck's stage production of Royston Tan's 881. She was also in the ensemble cast in Forbidden City: Portrait of an Empress (2006), Descendants of the Eunuch Admiral (2010), Impending Storm: The Silly Little Girl and the Funny Old Tree (2012), Lao Jiu: The Musical (2012) and Great World Cabaret (2015).

=== Film ===
In 2011, Dong took the lead in writer/director Wee Li Lin's sophomore feature effort, Forever as a video consultant who falls for a handsome music teacher. The role earned her the Star Hunter Award at the Shanghai International Film Festival in 2011. She was also the lead actress in Thong Kay Wee's risqué short film, Hidden Folk, as a woman whose sexual affair with a 15-year-old comes back to haunt her.

== Personal life ==
Dong met her husband, theatre practitioner and educator, Zachary Ho, on the set of ‘Descendants of the Eunuch Admiral’ in 2010. They wed in 2012.

Dong is also friends with fellow Singaporean singer Olinda Cho, after they met as teammates of Team Jay Chou on the sidelines of Sing! China in 2017.

In July 2024, Dong announced that she had ductal carcinoma in situ in her right breast and the tissue was removed for a biopsy. The biopsy revealed a 7mm tumour, classifying her as suffering from stage 1 of breast cancer. Dong would be undergoing radiation therapy and hormone therapy treatment.

== Discography ==
=== Extended plays ===
Year	Title	Label
2008	Lullaby Nomad	Independent

=== Singles ===
Year	Title	Label
2021	"快乐乐乐"	Do Be Do Di
2020	"潇洒走一回"	Do Be Do Di
2015	“星光”, solo Mandarin version of “Starlight”	Red Roof Records
2011	“Sing me to Sleep”, Fundraiser Theme Song for InHerShoes concert	Independent
2010	“Summer Samba”, (as lead vocalist of Bossa Negra)	Freelance United Music (Hong Kong)
2008	“别松开⼿手“, Fundraiser song for Sichuan Earthquake Victims	Kenn O Productions

=== Original Soundtracks ===
Year	Title	Label
2014	天冷就回来 If There’re Seasons, Collector's Edition	The Theatre Practice
2011	881 The Musical	Toy Factory Productions
2011	我爱你爱你爱你 Forever, (vocalist and lyricist for “我相信“)	Bobbing Buoy Productions
2009	天冷就回来 If There’re Seasons	Warner Music Singapore and The Theatre Practice
2009	Blood Ties, (“Close To You”)	Oak 3 Films

=== Compilations ===
Year	Title	Label
2015	Sing, Love, “Starlight” duet with Sezairi	Red Roof Records

=== Collaborations ===
Year	Title	Label
2015	Naughty “Noor” Nice (eponymous EP)	Independent
2007	Sturm und Drang, Robosonic (featured vocalist on “Die kleine Prinzessin”)	Diskomafia
2003	Budakumentary, Budak Pantai (as member of ngam, on “I Wanna Be With You/ Drive”)	Independent

== Filmography ==
=== Film ===
Year	Title	Role	Production company	Director
2013	Hidden Folk (short film)	Lead, “Lilian Mah”	FLIM	Thong Kay Wee
2011	我爱你爱你爱你 (Forever)	Lead, “Joey”	Bobbing Buoy Productions	Wee Li Lin

=== Variety Shows ===
Dong recently expanded her repertoire to include TV hosting in Ch U's infotainment series, ‘Homeward Bound’ and ‘Life Extraordinaire’.

Year	Title	Role	Production company	Channel
2019	How Are You?		Mediacorp	Channel 8
2017	City DNA	Host	unknown	Channel News Asia
2015	寻找毅中⼈人 Life Extraordinaire	Host	360 Productions	Channel U
2015	我家在这⾥里 Homeward Bound	Host	360 Productions	Channel U
2009	缘⾛走天涯 The Way We Live	Featured profile	August Pictures	Channel U
2009	新加坡.极爱.极短篇 Love Singapore	Featured profile	360 Productions	Channel U
2004	Singapore Idol Season 1	Contestant, top 40	Mediacorp	Channel 5

== Awards and nominations ==
Year	Ceremony	Accolade	Works	Notes
2018	Star Awards	Top 10 Most Popular Female Artistes	—N/a	Nominated
2019	Asian Rainbow TV Awards	Best Female Host Award	National Flavours 民族味	Won
