= Daphne Khoo =

Singaporean singer

Daphne Khoo Pheng Yi
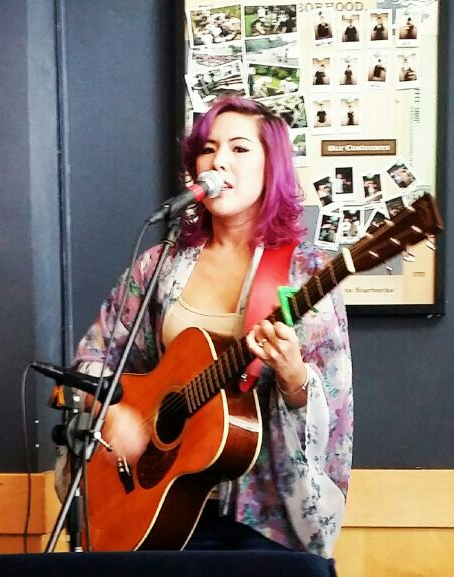
- Born: 22 January 1987 (age 39); Perth, Australia
- Education: Ngee Ann Polytechnic; RMIT University
- Years active: 2004–present
- Musical career
- Also known as: Haneri
- Genre: English pop
- Label: Daphne Khoo
- Website: www.daphnekhoomusic.virb.com

Daphne Khoo (born 22 January 1987) better known by her stage name Haneri is a Singaporean singer. She was a contestant in the first season of Singapore Idol, finishing up in fourth place (third runner up) during Asian Songs week. She was also host of Idol-on-Demand, an online programme for Singapore Idol. She was video-featured on Singapore youth TV station CTV. She was also one of the contestants in the television show The Dance Floor in the group Snaap!

== Early life and education ==
Khoo was born in Perth, Australia, and moved to Singapore when she was eight, where she lived with her family. She has an older and a younger sister. She studied in St Margarets Secondary School in Singapore.

She was a Mass Communications student at Ngee Ann Polytechnic's School of Film and Media Studies where she pursued a diploma. She completed her degree in communications at RMIT University in 2009 in Melbourne, Australia. In 2010, she began studying songwriting at Berklee College of Music in Boston, Massachusetts and graduated with a degree in Professional Music.

== Professional background ==
Khoo released her debut album in December 2007 titled Desperate featuring twelve tracks She has released a few unofficial singles, and one for the Idol-based show, Shooting Stars. She was formerly the lead singer of West Grand Boulevard.

Daphne lived in Los Angeles until 2019 and now resides in Singapore.

== Personal life ==
In 2012, Khoo discovered she had dysgerminoma which could lead to ovarian cancer.

== Filmography ==
- Shooting Stars (2005); from Singapore Idol
- The Showdown (2008); from Channel 5's brand new local game show

== Discography ==
=== Albums ===
- Desperate (2007)

=== Singles ===
- 2007: Doll
- 2008: Desperate
- 2012: Carry On
- 2013: Rooftops
- 2014: Wonderland
- 2014: Breathe
- 2015: Louder (Paul van Dyk & Roger Shah featuring Daphne Khoo)
- 2015: Greatest (Songs of the Games-2015 Southeast Asian Games)
- 2017: Burning Up
- 2018: Feel Alright
- 2022: Y Didn't You Say So
