= Sing! China season 2 =

Sing! China
- Season 2
- Hosted by: Hu Qiaohua (episode 1–12, 15); Yi Yi (episode 13–15); Shen Tao (episode 13–14)
- Coaches: Jay Chou; Na Ying; Eason Chan; Liu Huan
- Winner: Tashi Phuntsok 扎西平措
- Winning coach: Liu Huan
- Runner-up: Doris Guo 郭沁
- Finals venue: Beijing National Stadium

Release
- Original network: Zhejiang Television
- Original release: 14 July – 8 October 2017

Season chronology
- ← Previous; Season 1 Next → Season 3

The second season of the Chinese reality talent show Sing! China premiered on 14 July 2017 on Zhejiang Television. Jay Chou and Na Ying returned as coaches. Eason Chan and Liu Huan replaced Wang Feng and Harlem Yu as coaches. The show is hosted by Hu Qiaohua, who had previously hosted the finals in the last season and replaced Li Yong, who left after just one season.

On 8 October, Tashi Phuntsok 扎西平措 of Team Liu Huan was announced as the winner of the season, making him the oldest winner of the series. Doris Guo 郭沁 of Team Na Ying was the runner-up. Joanna Dong 董姿彦 of Team Jay finished in third place, while Team Eason's Ye Xiaoyue 叶晓粤 and Xiao Kaiye 肖凯晔 finished in fourth and fifth place respectively.

== Coaches and hosts ==
Sing! China season 2 coaches

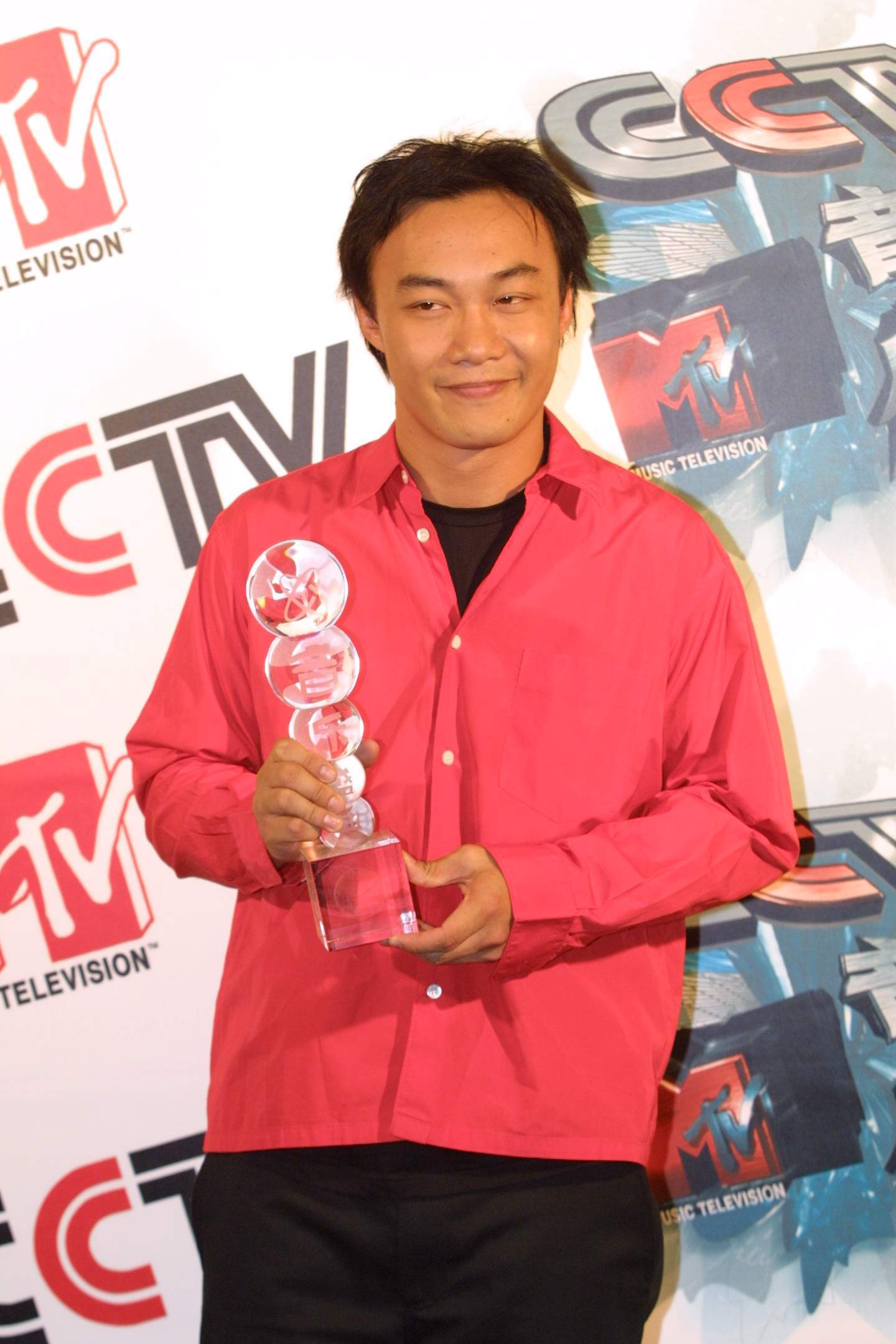
Eason Chan

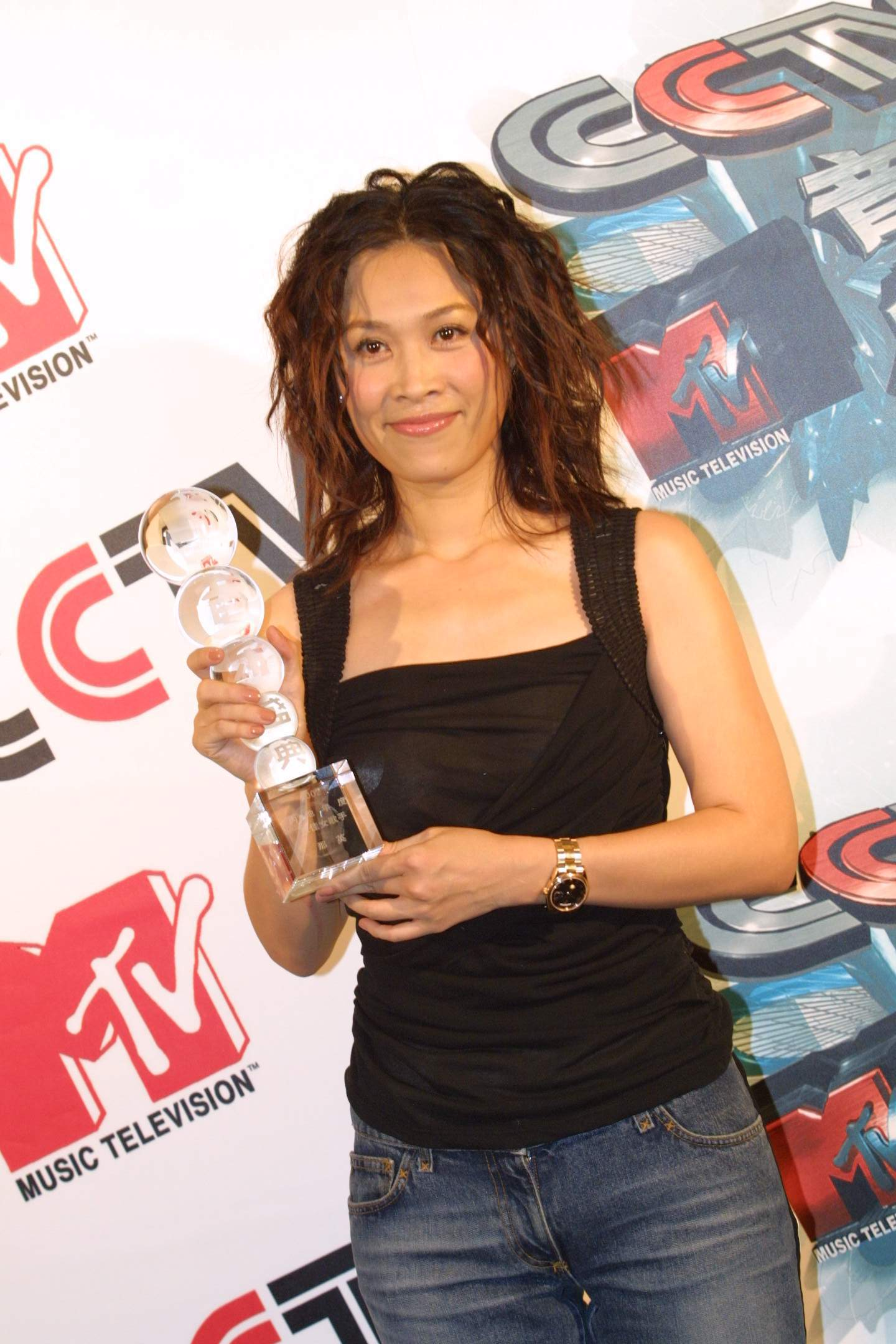
Na Ying

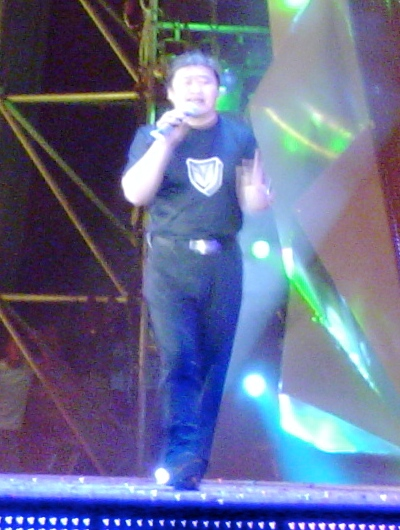
Liu Huan

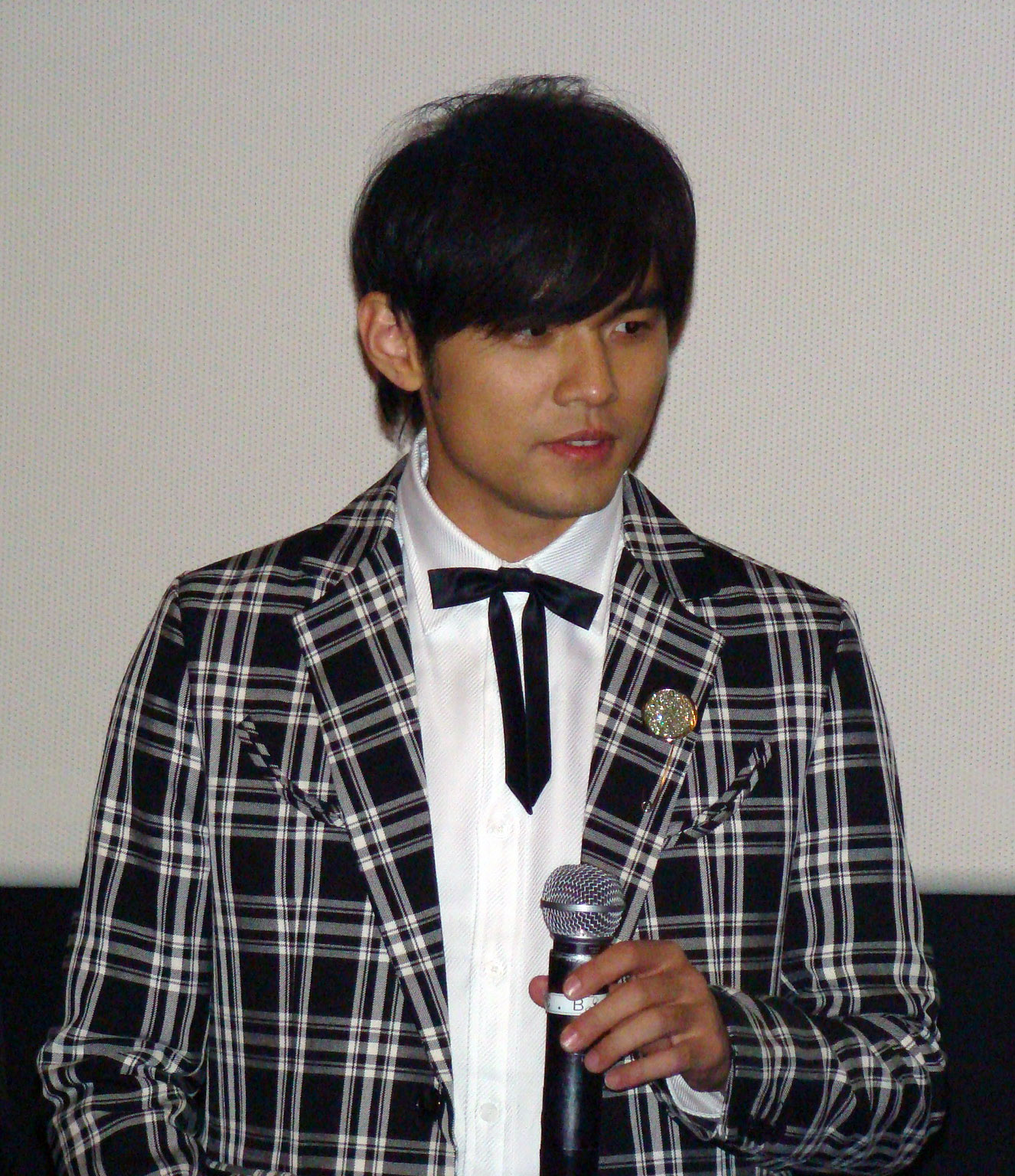
Jay Chou

On 24 November 2016, Jay Chou was confirmed to be returning for his second season. Eason Chan was also announced to join the show as a new coach, which effectively confirmed that there would be changes to the coaching panel with at least one of the coaches from the previous season exiting the show. On 8 December, it was claimed by an unknown media outlet that Liu Huan, who was formerly a coach on The Voice of China, would also be joining the show as a coach. Lu Wei, the show's publicity director, later refuted the claim. On 28 March 2017, Na Ying was confirmed to be returning for her second season. A month later, on 28 April, Wang Feng issued a statement via his management to announce his departure from the show to focus on his music career, but hinted a possibility of returning in the future seasons. On the same day following Wang's announcement, a photo showing a promotional banner that was claimed to have set up at one of the show's preliminary auditions began to circulate online. The banner in question revealed Liu as part of the coaching lineup, together with the other three coaches who have all been confirmed to join the show. With this, Liu was once again rumoured to be joining the show to fill the final seat on the coaching panel. Lu once again refuted the claim, stating that the promotional banner is "fake", and the team has yet to finalise on the selection of the final coach. However, despite the constant denial from Lu, Liu was announced on 19 May as the fourth coach to join the show, via one of the show's promotional video. Harlem Yu was therefore confirmed to have left the show.

Up till the airing of the premiere episode, it was not revealed who would take on the hosting role for the second season. It was previously rumoured that Li Yong would not return for his second season and be replaced by Shen Tao, a host from Zhejiang Television. On 14 July, Hu Qiaohua was revealed as the host on the premiere episode for the season, with Li exiting the show. The thirteenth and fourteenth episodes were hosted by Shen and Yi Yi.

== Teams ==
Colour key

- Winner
- Runner-up
- Third place
- Fourth place
- Fifth place
- Eliminated in the Playoffs (the Final Showdown)
- Eliminated in the Playoffs (the Knockouts)
- Eliminated in the Round-Robin Battle rounds
- Eliminated before the Round-Robin Battle rounds

Coaches	Top 43 artists			
Eason Chan				
Eason Chan	Ye Xiaoyue 叶晓粤	Xiao Kaiye 肖凯晔	Jeslyn Khoo 古洁縈	Zhang Ze 张泽
Eason Chan	Du Xingying 杜星萤	Yan Jun 闫峻	Yu Zibei 于梓贝	Han Shuai 韩帅
Eason Chan	Xia Qiming 夏启明	Cirenlaky 次仁拉吉	Khim Ng 黄韵琴	Sean Liu 刘羽晟
Na Ying				
Na Ying	Doris Guo 郭沁	Curley G 希林娜依·高	Leah Li 李雅	Ye Xuanqing 叶炫清
Na Ying	Billdisc Wang 王乐汀	Edward Wang 王振诺	Miracle Mao 毛雨张	Shao Yuan 邵元
Na Ying	Stella Seah 谢慧娴			
Liu Huan				
Liu Huan	Tashi Phuntsok 扎西平措	Zizi 子子	Hu Simo 胡斯默	Ji Hang 冀行
Liu Huan	Asia Zhang 张婉清	Ethan Zhang 张一腾	Frank & Annie 川虎	Jeffrey Chen 谢少唐
Liu Huan	Zhu Tingting 朱婷婷	Han Aegeol 韩艾洁	Hu Dongdong 胡栋栋	Liu Kai 刘凯
Liu Huan	Verna Lin 林筱庭			
Jay Chou				
Jay Chou	Joanna Dong 董姿彦	Darren 达布希勒图	Janice Tan 陈颖恩	Olinda Cho 卓猷燕
Jay Chou	Angel Mo 莫安琪	Kim Zhang 张鑫	Lucas Lee 李硕	Xiao Minye 肖敏晔
Jay Chou	Zhu Wenting 朱文婷			

== Blind auditions ==
The taping of the blind auditions began on 5 June and ended on 20 July. In the blind auditions, the coaches are to recruit nine artists to form a team of their own. Coaches may also recruit more than nine artists during the blind auditions, but to ensure equal representation across all the teams, they are required to cut their team down to nine artists before moving on to the Round-Robin Battle rounds. At the end of the blind auditions, Jay Chou and Na Ying each recruited nine artists to their teams, while 12 and 13 artists joined the teams of Eason Chan and Liu Huan respectively. Therefore, a total of seven artists (three from Team Eason and four from Team Liu Huan) were eliminated by their coaches and did not advance to the Round-Robin Battle rounds.

This season saw the introduction of the team badges and flags, which are specially designed by the coaches themselves. When an artist is defaulted or elected to join a coach's team, the respective coach's team flag would be lowered on stage, with the coach going forward to present the artist with the team badge as a signification of their addition to the team. The coach's respective victory songs ("谢谢侬" for Chan, "春暖花开" for Na, "千万次的问" for Liu, and "霍元甲" for Chou) would also be played in the background.

Colour key

✔	Coach pressed his or her button
	Artist defaulted to this coach's team
	Artist elected to join this coach's team
	Artist eliminated by coach before the Round-Robin Battle rounds
	Artist eliminated with no coach pressing his or her button

=== Episode 1 (14 July) ===
The four coaches performed a medley of each other's songs – Eason Chan and Na Ying performed "天地在我心", Jay Chou & Liu Huan performed a medley of "一笑而过" and "你的背包", Chan & Chou performed a medley of "印第安老斑鸠" and "谢谢侬", Chou and Na performed "因为爱情", Chan and Liu performed "菊花台", Liu and Na performed "过把瘾" – and concluded the performances with "沧海一声笑".

Order	Artist	Age	Hometown	Song	Coach's and artist's choices			
Order	Artist	Age	Hometown	Song	Eason	Ying	Huan	Jay
1	Cirenlaky 次仁拉吉	26	Lhasa, Tibet	"穷开心"	✔	✔	—	—
2	Zhu Wenting 朱文婷	29	Wuhan, Hubei	"淘汰"	✔	✔	✔	✔
3	Ye Xuanqing 叶炫清	19	Shaoxing, Zhejiang	"从前慢"	✔	✔	✔	✔
4	Zhang Ze 张泽	22	Jinan, Shandong	"天气这么热"	✔	—	✔	—
5	Fu Rongpeng 符荣鹏	21	Haikou, Hainan	"无条件"	—	—	—	—
6	Joanna Dong 董姿彦	35	Singapore	"恋曲1990"	✔	—	✔	✔

=== Episode 2 (21 July) ===
Eason Chan auditioned as a joke with one of his signature songs "十年", with all three other coaches pressing their buttons for him.

Order	Artist	Age	Hometown	Song	Coach's and artist's choices			
Order	Artist	Age	Hometown	Song	Eason	Ying	Huan	Jay
1	Jaymie Cheung 张美仪	20	Hong Kong	"想和你去吹吹风"	—	—	—	—
2	Angela 乐洋 & Feeling 菲林	17 / 21	Shanghai	"告白气球" / "Now You See Me"	—	—	—	—
3	Frank & Annie 川虎 (Frank Ju 鞠红川 & Annie Lowdermilk 唐伯虎)	23 / 26	Ürümqi, Xinjiang / United States	"我要你"	—	—	✔	—
4	Hu Simo 胡斯默	23	Wuhan, Hubei	"三月"	✔	—	✔	—
5	Ye Xiaoyue 叶晓粤	26	Shantou, Guangdong	"闷"	✔	✔	—	—
6	Tashi Phuntsok 扎西平措	30	Shigatse, Tibet	"一面湖水"	—	✔	✔	✔
7	Yu Zibei 于梓贝	22	Guangzhou, Guangdong	"模特"	✔	✔	—	—
8	Zizi 子子	33	Vancouver, Canada	"Careless Whisper"	—	✔	✔	—
9	Edward Wang 王振诺	23	Taipei, Taiwan	"别说没爱过"	—	✔	✔	—

=== Episode 3 (28 July) ===
Order	Artist	Age	Hometown	Song	Coach's and artist's choices			
Order	Artist	Age	Hometown	Song	Eason	Ying	Huan	Jay
1	Han Shuai 韩帅	26	Tongliao, Inner Mongolia	"烽火扬州路"	✔	—	—	—
2	Shao Yuan 邵元	20	Zhengzhou, Henan	"推开世界的门"	—	✔	—	—
3	Xiao Minye 肖敏晔	25	Heyuan, Guangdong	"回到过去"	✔	—	✔	✔
4	Jeslyn Khoo 古洁縈	18	Kuala Lumpur, Malaysia	"Oh Boy"	✔	✔	✔	—
5	Darren 达布希勒图	19	Bole, Xinjiang	"第三人称"	✔	—	✔	✔
6	Curley G 希林娜依·高	18	Turpan, Xinjiang / Singapore	"无与伦比的美丽"	✔	✔	—	—
7	Billdisc Wang 王乐汀	37	Ningbo, Zhejiang	"Leave Me Alone"	✔	✔	—	—
8	Yen Li Phaye 颜力妃	30	New Taipei, Taiwan	"完美的一天"	—	—	—	—
9	Ethan Zhang 张一腾	28	Chengdu, Sichuan	"性别"	—	✔	✔	—
10	Du Xingying 杜星萤	21	Wuhan, Hubei	"致姗姗来迟的你"	✔	✔	—	—
11	Xia Qiming 夏启明	23	Yiyang, Hunan	"Only You (And You Alone)"	✔	—	—	—
12	Ji Hang 冀行	24	Baoding, Hebei	"极乐世界"	—	✔	✔	—

=== Episode 4 (4 August) ===
Order	Artist	Age	Hometown	Song	Coach's and artist's choices			
Order	Artist	Age	Hometown	Song	Eason	Ying	Huan	Jay
1	Zhang Shanshan 张珊珊	23	Fuzhou, Fujian	"刚刚好"	—	—	—	—
2	Yang Xiaoshuai 杨小帅	26	Linzhou, Henan	"儿时"	—	—	—	—
3	Wang Yijia 王懿佳	22	Tianshui, Gansu	"心的距离"	—	—	—	—
4	Angel Mo 莫安琪	26	Chongqing / Vancouver, Canada	"好汉歌"	✔	—	✔	✔
5	Olinda Cho 卓猷燕	37	Singapore	"不能说的秘密"	—	✔	✔	✔
6	Doris Guo 郭沁	17	Changsha, Hunan	"美若黎明"	✔	✔	—	—
7	Kim Zhang 张鑫	23	Hohhot, Inner Mongolia	"如果来生还能遇见你"	—	—	—	✔
8	Wawa 娃娃	53	Kaohsiung, Taiwan	"时间都去哪儿了"	—	—	—	—
9	Zhu Tingting 朱婷婷	22	Shenzhen, Guangdong	"我"	✔	—	✔	—
10	Hu Dongdong 胡栋栋	20	Taizhou, Zhejiang	"我想我不会爱你"	—	—	✔	—
11	Stella Seah 谢慧娴	25	Singapore	"我是一只鱼"	✔	✔	—	—
12	Lucas Lee 李硕	27	Xi'an, Shaanxi	"如果你爱我"	—	—	✔	✔

=== Episode 5 (11 August) ===
Order	Artist	Age	Hometown	Song	Coach's and artist's choices			
Order	Artist	Age	Hometown	Song	Eason	Ying	Huan	Jay
1	Ginga 金甲 (Qicai 奇才, Qiwei 奇巍 & Nari 娜日)	N/A	Chengdu, Sichuan	"九妹"	—	—	—	—
2	Chen Sidi 陈思镝	26	Zigong, Sichuan	"模范情书"	—	—	—	—
3	Han Aegeol 韩艾洁	23	Yanbian, Jilin	"等不到天昏地暗"	—	—	✔	—
4	Sean Liu 刘羽晟	28	Changchun, Jilin	"陪你过冬天"	✔	—	—	—
5	Verna Lin 林筱庭	19	Kaohsiung, Taiwan	"轮回"	—	—	✔	—
6	Joe Chen 陈王杰	28	Wenling, Zhejiang	"我的爱"	—	—	—	—
7	Khim Ng 黄韵琴	25	Singapore	"You Oughta Know"	✔	✔	—	—
8	Yan Jun 闫峻	22	Mianyang, Sichuan	"没有你"	✔	—	—	—
9	Janice Tan 陈颖恩	16	Penang, Malaysia	"那些你很冒险的梦"	—	✔	—	✔
10	Xiao Kaiye 肖凯晔	26	Heyuan, Guangdong	"爱我"	✔	✔	—	—
11	Zhang Ludi 张禄籴	33	Tianjin	"只如初见"	—	—	—	—
12	Miracle Mao 毛雨张	26	Harbin, Heilongjiang	"你敢我就敢"	—	✔	—	—
13	Asia Zhang 张婉清	21	Xiamen, Fujian	"浪人情歌"	—	—	✔	—
14	Jeffrey Chen 谢少唐	23	Johor Bahru, Malaysia	"When I Was Your Man"	—	—	✔	—
15	Leah Li 李雅	26	Wenzhou, Zhejiang	"旅途"	—	✔	—	—
16	Liu Kai 刘凯	30	Changchun, Jilin	"天黑"	✔	—	✔	—

== The Round-Robin Battles ==
The post-blind auditions stage of the competition kicked off with the round-robin Battle rounds, a competition format modified from the Cross Fighting rounds featured in the previous season. Dubbed as the "six-dimensional round-robin battles", the competition would see all four coaches going head-to-head against one another in the all-play-all format, with each coach facing off with every other coach in separate Battle rounds. In each round, the two coaches involved would randomly pick an artist from their personal team. The two selected artists would then perform and receive votes of approval from a 51-person panel. The artist with the most votes in each Battle rounds would advance to the Playoffs, while the other would be eliminated. The eliminated artist would lose their personal team badge and had to pass it on to a surviving team member. The team flag of the winning artist would then be lowered on stage with the team's victory song playing in the background.

Each coach would be allowed to save one losing artist from their team by pressing the button on their chair before the artist leaves the stage. The saved artists would then perform again in the "coach's save" round, with the one receiving the most votes moving on to the Playoffs. Coach's saves that are not used by the coaches by the end of the three-week round-robin Battles would be forfeited.

The round-robin Battle rounds were taped on 7, 8, and 13 August.

Colour key

Artist won the Battle and advanced to the Playoffs
Artist lost the Battle but was saved by coach
Artist won the Battle in the "coach's save" round and advanced to the Playoffs
Artist lost the Battle and was eliminated

Episode	Coach	Order	Artist	Song	Panel votes	Result
Episode 6 (18 August)	Na Ying	1.1	Stella Seah 谢慧娴	"Flow"	11	Eliminated
Episode 6 (18 August)	Jay Chou	1.2	Janice Tan 陈颖恩	"时间有泪"	40	Panel's vote
Episode 6 (18 August)	Eason Chan	2.1	Du Xingying 杜星萤	"给你看"	27	Panel's vote
Episode 6 (18 August)	Liu Huan	2.2	Jeffrey Chen 谢少唐	"Lay Me Down"	24	Eliminated
Episode 6 (18 August)	Jay Chou	3.1	Kim Zhang 张鑫	"Blue Suede Shoes" / "给我一个吻"	20	Eliminated
Episode 6 (18 August)	Eason Chan	3.2	Jeslyn Khoo 古洁縈	"Bang Bang"	31	Panel's vote
Episode 6 (18 August)	Liu Huan	4.1	Tashi Phuntsok 扎西平措	"春"	45	Panel's vote
Episode 6 (18 August)	Na Ying	4.2	Shao Yuan 邵元	"闪光的回忆"	6	Eliminated
Episode 6 (18 August)	Eason Chan	5.1	Xia Qiming 夏启明	"全世界谁倾听你"	8	Eliminated
Episode 6 (18 August)	Na Ying	5.2	Leah Li 李雅	"越过山丘"	43	Panel's vote
Episode 7 (25 August)	Jay Chou	1.1	Olinda Cho 卓猷燕	"蓝天"	42	Panel's vote
Episode 7 (25 August)	Na Ying	1.2	Edward Wang 王振诺	"拥有"	9	Eliminated
Episode 7 (25 August)	Jay Chou	2.1	Angel Mo 莫安琪	"刀马旦" / "老司机带带我"	14	Eliminated
Episode 7 (25 August)	Eason Chan	2.2	Ye Xiaoyue 叶晓粤	"母系社会"	37	Panel's vote
Episode 7 (25 August)	Liu Huan	3.1	Ji Hang 冀行	"我俩"	27	Panel's vote
Episode 7 (25 August)	Jay Chou	3.2	Darren 达布希勒图	"相爱一场"	24	Jay's save
Episode 7 (25 August)	Liu Huan	4.1	Zhu Tingting 朱婷婷	"父亲写的散文诗"	2	Eliminated
Episode 7 (25 August)	Na Ying	4.2	Curley G 希林娜依·高	"Sweet Child o' Mine"	49	Panel's vote
Episode 7 (25 August)	Eason Chan	5.1	Yan Jun 闫峻	"想着你"	28	Panel's vote
Episode 7 (25 August)	Liu Huan	5.2	Ethan Zhang 张一腾	"什么"	23	Eliminated
Episode 8 (1 September)	Eason Chan	1.1	Xiao Kaiye 肖凯晔	"至少还有你"	35	Panel's vote
Episode 8 (1 September)	Na Ying	1.2	Miracle Mao 毛雨张	"烟火里的尘埃"	16	Eliminated
Episode 8 (1 September)	Jay Chou	2.1	Xiao Minye 肖敏晔	"Mad" / "给我一首歌的时间"	21	Eliminated
Episode 8 (1 September)	Eason Chan	2.2	Zhang Ze 张泽	"Billie Jean"	30	Panel's vote
Episode 8 (1 September)	Jay Chou	3.1	Lucas Lee 李硕	"位置"	23	Eliminated
Episode 8 (1 September)	Na Ying	3.2	Ye Xuanqing 叶炫清	"想自由"	28	Panel's vote
Episode 8 (1 September)	Liu Huan	4.1	Asia Zhang 张婉清	"因为单身的缘故"	15	Eliminated
Episode 8 (1 September)	Na Ying	4.2	Doris Guo 郭沁	"船歌"	36	Panel's vote
Episode 8 (1 September)	Jay Chou	5.1	Zhu Wenting 朱文婷	"别让梦醒来"	17	Eliminated
Episode 8 (1 September)	Liu Huan	5.2	Hu Simo 胡斯默	"无字歌：孔雀西去"	34	Panel's vote
Episode 9 (8 September)	Eason Chan	1.1	Han Shuai 韩帅	"小鸟"	25	Eliminated
Episode 9 (8 September)	Liu Huan	1.2	Zizi 子子	"不散, 不见"	26	Panel's vote
Episode 9 (8 September)	Jay Chou	2.1	Joanna Dong 董姿彦	"我要你的爱" / "I Want You to Be My Baby"	47	Panel's vote
Episode 9 (8 September)	Liu Huan	2.2	Frank & Annie 川虎	"Falling Slowly"	4	Liu Huan's save
Episode 9 (8 September)	Eason Chan	3.1	Yu Zibei 于梓贝	"普通朋友"	45	Panel's vote
Episode 9 (8 September)	Na Ying	3.2	Billdisc Wang 王乐汀	"怕你为自己流泪"	6	Eliminated
Episode 9 (8 September)	Coach's save performances					
Episode 9 (8 September)	Jay Chou	4.1	Darren 达布希勒图	"达尔文"	26	Panel's vote
Episode 9 (8 September)	Liu Huan	4.2	Frank & Annie 川虎	"当你老了" / "What a Wonderful World"	25	Eliminated

Results summary

Team Na Ying	1–2	Team Jay

Individual Battle rounds

Stella Seah 谢慧娴	11–40	Janice Tan 陈颖恩
Edward Wang 王振诺	9–42	Olinda Cho 卓猷燕
Ye Xuanqing 叶炫清	28–23	Lucas Lee 李硕

Team Eason	2–1	Team Liu Huan

Individual Battle rounds

Du Xingying 杜星萤	27–24	Jeffrey Chen 谢少唐
Yan Jun 闫峻	28–23	Ethan Zhang 张一腾
Han Shuai 韩帅	25–26	Zizi 子子

Team Jay	0–3	Team Eason

Individual Battle rounds

Kim Zhang 张鑫	20–31	Jeslyn Khoo 古洁縈
Angel Mo 莫安琪	14–37	Ye Xiaoyue 叶晓粤
Xiao Minye 肖敏晔	21–30	Zhang Ze 张泽

Team Liu Huan	1–2	Team Na Ying

Individual Battle rounds

Tashi Phuntsok 扎西平措	45–6	Shao Yuan 邵元
Zhu Tingting 朱婷婷	2–49	Curley G 希林娜依·高
Asia Zhang 张婉清	15–36	Doris Guo 郭沁

Team Eason	2–1	Team Na Ying

Individual Battle rounds

Xia Qiming 夏启明	8–43	Leah Li 李雅
Xiao Kaiye 肖凯晔	35–16	Miracle Mao 毛雨张
Yu Zibei 于梓贝	45–6	Billdisc Wang 王乐汀

Team Liu Huan	2–1	Team Jay

Individual Battle rounds

Ji Hang 冀行	27–24	Darren 达布希勒图
Hu Simo 胡斯默	34–17	Zhu Wenting 朱文婷
Frank & Annie 川虎	4–47	Joanna Dong 董姿彦

== The Playoffs ==
The Top 19 performed in the Playoff rounds for a spot in the finals. The format of the Playoff rounds for this season was reverted to the one used for the first three seasons of The Voice of China, which saw the remaining artists competing against their fellow team members instead of artists from other teams. At the end of the Playoffs, each coach will crown one artist as their team winner, who will later represent them in the finals. Coach Eason Chan crowned two team winners, instead of one, as he had the most artists (seven) competing in the Playoffs. The competition was split into two rounds — the Knockouts and the Final Showdown.

In the Knockout rounds, the teams would be split into groups of two (or three for one of Team Eason's Knockout rounds). Each Knockout pairing will see the artists competing against each other via duet performances with celebrity guests. The two artists will then receive votes of approval from a 51-person panel. The other three non-competitive coaches were also given two votes each, which they have to cast for one of the artists in the knockout pairing. The artist with the most votes will advance to the Final Showdown, while the other would be eliminated.

In the Final Showdown, the remaining artists will perform a solo song against their fellow team member. Similar to the Knockout rounds, the artists will receive votes of approval from a 51-person panel at the end of the performances. On top of the votes given by the panel, their respective coaches were also given 50 votes each, which they have to allocate to their own remaining artists at their discretion. The artist with the most votes will be crowned as the team winner and advance to the finals, while the other would be eliminated.

The Playoff rounds were taped on 29 August, 12, 13, and 14 September for Team Na Ying, Team Eason, Team Jay, and Team Liu Huan respectively.

Colour key

Artist received the highest accumulated votes in the knockouts (advanced to the final showdown)
Artist received the highest accumulated votes in the final showdown and was crowned the winner of the team (advanced to the finals)
Artist received the lowest accumulated votes and was eliminated

Episode	Coach	Order	Artist	Song (duet partner if applicable)	Panel votes	Coach votes	Total votes	Result
Episode 10 (15 September)								
Episode 10 (15 September)	Na Ying	Knockout performances						
Episode 10 (15 September)	Na Ying	1.1	Leah Li 李雅	"我爱你, 再见" (with Zhang Lei)	4	0^{1}	4	Eliminated
Episode 10 (15 September)	Na Ying	1.2	Curley G 希林娜依·高	"男孩" (with Bruce Liang)	47	4^{1}	51	Advanced
Episode 10 (15 September)	Na Ying	2.1	Ye Xuanqing 叶炫清	"胡桃夹子" (with Diamond Zhang)	17	0	17	Eliminated
Episode 10 (15 September)	Na Ying	2.2	Doris Guo 郭沁	"大鱼" (with Zhou Shen)	34	6	40	Advanced
Episode 10 (15 September)	Na Ying	Final showdown performances						
Episode 10 (15 September)	Na Ying	3.1	Curley G 希林娜依·高	"她来听我的演唱会"	22	0^{2}	22	Eliminated
Episode 10 (15 September)	Na Ying	3.2	Doris Guo 郭沁	"紫"	29	0^{2}	29	Na Ying's winner
Episode 10 (15 September)	Eason Chan	Knockout performances						
Episode 10 (15 September)	Eason Chan	1.1	Yan Jun 闫峻	"演员和歌手" (with Li Ronghao)	9	2	11	Eliminated
Episode 10 (15 September)	Eason Chan	1.2	Xiao Kaiye 肖凯晔	"生命中的精灵" (with Kay Huang)	42	4	46	Advanced
Episode 11 (22 September)	Eason Chan	2.1	Du Xingying 杜星萤	"末路狂花" (with Waa Wei)	23	0	23	Eliminated
Episode 11 (22 September)	Eason Chan	2.2	Zhang Ze 张泽	"内疚" (with Li Ronghao)	28	6	34	Advanced
Episode 11 (22 September)	Eason Chan	3.1	Jeslyn Khoo 古洁縈	"喜欢你现在的样子" (with Kay Huang)	8 / 31^{3}	0 / 2^{3}	8 / 33^{3}	Advanced
Episode 11 (22 September)	Eason Chan	3.2	Ye Xiaoyue 叶晓粤	"平凡之路" (with Miriam Yeung)	43	6	49	Advanced
Episode 11 (22 September)	Eason Chan	3.3	Yu Zibei 于梓贝	"可惜我是水瓶座" (with Miriam Yeung)	20	4	24	Eliminated
Episode 11 (22 September)	Eason Chan	Final showdown performances						
Episode 11 (22 September)	Eason Chan	4.1	Xiao Kaiye 肖凯晔	"臭美"	27	30	57	Eason's winner
Episode 11 (22 September)	Eason Chan	4.2	Zhang Ze 张泽	"周大侠"	24	20	44	Eliminated
Episode 11 (22 September)	Eason Chan	5.1	Ye Xiaoyue 叶晓粤	"Bad Boy"	27	30	57	Eason's winner
Episode 11 (22 September)	Eason Chan	5.2	Jeslyn Khoo 古洁縈	"湿了分寸"	24	20	44	Eliminated
Episode 12 (29 September)								
Episode 12 (29 September)	Jay Chou	Knockout performances						
Episode 12 (29 September)	Jay Chou	1.1	Janice Tan 陈颖恩	"记得" (with Cao Yang)	18	4^{4}	22	Eliminated
Episode 12 (29 September)	Jay Chou	1.2	Darren 达布希勒图	"那又怎样" (with Na Ying)	33	0^{4}	33	Advanced
Episode 12 (29 September)	Jay Chou	2.1	Olinda Cho 卓猷燕	"安静" (with Harlem Yu)	6	0	6	Eliminated
Episode 12 (29 September)	Jay Chou	2.2	Joanna Dong 董姿彦	"老实情歌" / "靠近" (with Harlem Yu)	45	6	51	Advanced
Episode 12 (29 September)	Jay Chou	Final showdown performances						
Episode 12 (29 September)	Jay Chou	3.1	Darren 达布希勒图	"Dear Friend"	15	24	39	Eliminated
Episode 12 (29 September)	Jay Chou	3.2	Joanna Dong 董姿彦	"Open Arms" / "情人的眼泪"	36	26	62	Jay's winner
Episode 12 (29 September)	Liu Huan	Knockout performances						
Episode 12 (29 September)	Liu Huan	1.1	Tashi Phuntsok 扎西平措	"窗" (with Sitar Tan)	44	4	48	Advanced
Episode 12 (29 September)	Liu Huan	1.2	Hu Simo 胡斯默	"波罗维茨舞曲" (with Jason Zhang)	7	2	9	Eliminated
Episode 12 (29 September)	Liu Huan	2.1	Ji Hang 冀行	"鱼鸟之恋" (with Sitar Tan)	8	2	10	Eliminated
Episode 12 (29 September)	Liu Huan	2.2	Zizi 子子	"Just One Last Dance" (with Jason Zhang)	43	4	47	Advanced
Episode 12 (29 September)	Liu Huan	Final showdown performances						
Episode 12 (29 September)	Liu Huan	3.1	Tashi Phuntsok 扎西平措	"阿妈的手"	47	26	73	Liu Huan's winner
Episode 12 (29 September)	Liu Huan	3.2	Zizi 子子	"你都好吗"	4	24	28	Eliminated

1. Jay Chou chose not to vote for any of the artists.
2. Na Ying chose to abstain from voting.
3. In the special three-person knockout, Jeslyn Khoo 古洁縈 first faced off with Ye Xiaoyue 叶晓粤. With Ye advancing to the final showdown after receiving a higher number of accumulated votes, Khoo later faced off with Yu Zibei 于梓贝, thus receiving two sets of panel and coach votes.
4. Na Ying was not allowed to vote for any of the artists as she was the duet partner for Darren 达布希勒图.

Non-competition performances
Order	Performer(s)	Song
10.1	Na Ying & her team with Bruce Liang (Curley G 希林娜依·高, Doris Guo 郭沁, Leah Li 李雅 & Ye Xuanqing 叶炫清)	"日落大道"
10.2	Eason Chan & his team (Du Xingying 杜星萤, Jeslyn Khoo 古洁縈, Xiao Kaiye 肖凯晔, Yan Jun 闫峻, Ye Xiaoyue 叶晓粤, Yu Zibei 于梓贝 & Zhang Ze 张泽)	"第一个雅皮士"
11.1	Jay Chou & his team (Darren 达布希勒图, Janice Tan 陈颖恩, Joanna Dong 董姿彦 & Olinda Cho 卓猷燕)	"牛仔很忙" / "水手怕水"
11.2	Bi Xia	"平身"
11.3	Li Qi	"最长的旅途"
11.4	XL	"使劲爱"
12.1	Liu Huan & his team (Hu Simo 胡斯默, Ji Hang 冀行, Tashi Phuntsok 扎西平措 & Zizi 子子)	"喂鸡"

== Finals ==
The Top 5 performed live in a two-part season finale on 8 October, held at the Beijing National Stadium. In the first round of the competition, the five finalists performed a duet with their coach, and a solo song. Based on the public votes received from the live audience at the end of the first round, the bottom three artists with the fewest votes would be eliminated.

The final two artists would then sing their winner's song before a 101-person panel and live audience, who will vote for the winner at the end of the performances. Every member of the panel would be entitled to one vote, and the total number of votes received by the artists from the panel and live audience would be converted into percentage points accordingly. The artist who received the highest number of points would be announced as the winner.

Coach	Artist	Round 1					Round 2					Result
Coach	Artist	Order	Duet song (with coach)	Order	Solo song	Public votes	Order	Winner's song	Panel votes (points)	Public points	Total points	Result
Eason Chan	Ye Xiaoyue 叶晓粤	1	"娱乐天空"	6	"我的时代"	16,544	N/A (already eliminated)					Fourth place
Jay Chou	Joanna Dong 董姿彦	2	"简单爱" / "Top of the World"^{1}	9	"掌声响起"	19,220	N/A (already eliminated)					Third place
Na Ying	Doris Guo 郭沁	3	"三生三世十里桃花"^{1}	8	"但愿人长久"	38,256	11	"传奇"	41 (40.59)	54.23	94.82	Runner-up
Eason Chan	Xiao Kaiye 肖凯晔	4	"不该"	7	"他不爱我"	8,622	N/A (already eliminated)					Fifth place
Liu Huan	Tashi Phuntsok 扎西平措	5	"我和你"	10	"鸟人"	28,646	12	"齐天"	60 (59.41)	45.77	105.18	Winner

1. Before the start of the solo performances in the first round, it was revealed that Doris Guo 郭沁 and Joanna Dong 董姿彦 were leading in the number of public votes.

Non-competition performances
Order	Performer(s)	Song
15.1	Momo Wu	"信天游"
15.2	Zhou Shen & Ye Xuanqing 叶炫清	"从前慢"
15.3	Ji Hang 冀行, Ye Xuanqing 叶炫清, Yu Zibei 于梓贝 & Zhang Ze 张泽	"第二季 'OPPO中国新歌声' 加油歌"
15.4	The Top 36 & Maggie Yuan	"勇敢的心"

== Non-competition shows ==
=== The Mid-Autumn Special (4 October) ===
The thirteenth episode was a two-hour special aired on 4 October, featuring performances by the coaches and artists in celebration of the Mid-Autumn Festival. The episode was taped on 15 September.

Episode	Order	Performer(s)	Song
Episode 13 (4 October)	1	Jay Chou, Janice Tan 陈颖恩, Xiao Minye 肖敏晔 & Zhu Wenting 朱文婷	"乌克丽丽"
Episode 13 (4 October)	2	Jeslyn Khoo 古洁縈 & Zhang Ze 张泽 (Team Eason); Billdisc Wang 王乐汀 & Stella Seah 谢慧娴 (Team Na Ying); Asia Zhang 张婉清 & Ethan Zhang 张一腾 (Team Liu Huan); Kim Zhang 张鑫 & Zhu Wenting 朱文婷 (Team Jay)	"夜空中最亮的星"
Episode 13 (4 October)	3	Xia Qiming 夏启明 & Zhu Tingting 朱婷婷	"全世界谁倾听你"
Episode 13 (4 October)	4	Team Jay (minus Angel Mo 莫安琪)	"我要夏天"
Episode 13 (4 October)	5	Jay Chou, Darren 达布希勒图, Kim Zhang 张鑫 & Lucas Lee 李硕	"想你就写信" / "彩虹"
Episode 13 (4 October)	6	Frank & Annie 川虎	"当你老了" / "What a Wonderful World"
Episode 13 (4 October)	7	Liu Huan	"落叶"
Episode 13 (4 October)	8	Liu Huan	"情怨"
Episode 13 (4 October)	9	Yu Zibei 于梓贝 & Resound	"饿狼传说"
Episode 13 (4 October)	10	Eason Chan	"谁来剪月光"
Episode 13 (4 October)	11	Ye Xuanqing 叶炫清	"从前慢"
Episode 13 (4 October)	12	Na Ying	"三生三世十里桃花"
Episode 13 (4 October)	13	Ji Hang 冀行	"雪莲"
Episode 13 (4 October)	14	Hu Simo 胡斯默	"红眼睛"

=== The National Day Special (5 October) ===
The fourteenth episode was a two-hour special episode aired on 5 October, featuring performances by the coaches and artists from the current and past seasons in celebration of the National Day of the People's Republic of China. The episode was taped on 1 September 2017, at the Cotai Arena.

Colour key

Artist won the Battle
Artist lost the Battle

Episode	Coach	Order	Song	Team Season 2 Artists	Team Masked Artists	Song
Episode 14 (5 October)	Na Ying	1	"无与伦比的美丽"	Curley G 希林娜依·高	XL	"海芋恋"
Episode 14 (5 October)	Na Ying	2	"旅途"	Leah Li 李雅	Zhang Hengyuan	"飞得更高"
Episode 14 (5 October)	Liu Huan	3	"Careless Whisper"	Zizi 子子	Li Qi	"十年"
Episode 14 (5 October)	Liu Huan	4	"三月"	Hu Simo 胡斯默	Tan Xuanyuan	"追梦赤子心"
Episode 14 (5 October)	Eason Chan	5	"爱我"	Xiao Kaiye 肖凯晔	Zheng Jiawen	"停格"
Episode 14 (5 October)	Eason Chan	6	"母系社会"	Ye Xiaoyue 叶晓粤	Zhang Wei	"High歌"
Episode 14 (5 October)	Jay Chou	7	"不能说的秘密"	Olinda Cho 卓猷燕	Li Wei	"烟花易冷"
Episode 14 (5 October)	Jay Chou	8	"恋曲1990"	Joanna Dong 董姿彦	Liu Xuejing	"就是现在"

Other performances
Order	Performer(s)	Song
1	Xiao Kaiye 肖凯晔 & Ye Xiaoyue 叶晓粤 (Team Eason); Curley G 希林娜依·高 & Leah Li 李雅 (Team Na Ying); Hu Simo 胡斯默 & Zizi 子子 (Team Liu Huan); Joanna Dong 董姿彦 & Olinda Cho 卓猷燕 (Team Jay)	"歌唱祖国"
2	Na Ying	"你不是说"
3	Liu Huan	"天地在我心"
4	Eason Chan	"披风"
5	Jay Chou	"告白气球"
6	Na Ying	"有个爱你的人不容易"
7	Liu Huan	"夜"
8	Eason Chan	"床头灯"
9	Jay Chou, Joanna Dong 董姿彦 & Olinda Cho 卓猷燕	"听见下雨的声音"
10	Team Season 2 Artists & Team Masked Artists (minus Zhang Hengyuan)	"相亲相爱一家人"

== Reception ==
=== CSM52 ratings ===
Episode		Original airdate	Production	Time slot (UTC+8)	Rating	Share	Ranking	Source
1	"The Blind Auditions Premiere"	14 July 2017	201	Friday 9:10 p.m.	2.604	10.34	1	
2	"The Blind Auditions, Part 2"	21 July 2017	202	Friday 9:10 p.m.	2.377	9.45	1	
3	"The Blind Auditions, Part 3"	28 July 2017	203	Friday 9:10 p.m.	2.281	9.57	1	
4	"The Blind Auditions, Part 4"	4 August 2017	204	Friday 9:10 p.m.	2.547	10.47	1	
5	"The Blind Auditions, Part 5"	11 August 2017	205	Friday 9:10 p.m.	2.278	9.65	1	
6	"The Round-Robin Battles Premiere"	18 August 2017	206	Friday 9:10 p.m.	2.288	9.82	1	
7	"The Round-Robin Battles, Part 2"	25 August 2017	207	Friday 9:10 p.m.	2.214	9.32	1	
8	"The Round-Robin Battles, Part 3"	1 September 2017	208	Friday 9:10 p.m.	1.861	7.29	1	
9	"The Round-Robin Battles, Part 4"	8 September 2017	209	Friday 9:10 p.m.	1.813	7.66	1	
10	"The Playoffs, Part 1"	15 September 2017	210	Friday 9:10 p.m.	1.883	8.26	1	
11	"The Playoffs, Part 2"	22 September 2017	211	Friday 9:10 p.m.	1.816	8.51	1	
12	"The Playoffs, Part 3"	29 September 2017	212	Friday 9:10 p.m.	1.438	7.35	1	
13	"The Mid-Autumn Special"	4 October 2017	213	Wednesday 8:30 p.m.	0.700	2.36	3	
14	"The National Day Special"	5 October 2017	214	Thursday 9:10 p.m.	0.640	3.41	2	
15	"The Live Finals, Round 1"	8 October 2017	215	Sunday 8:00 p.m.	2.201	8.14	1	
15	"The Live Finals, Round 2"	8 October 2017	215	Sunday 8:00 p.m.	2.058	13.18	2	
