= Curley G =

Chinese singer and songwriter

- 希林娜依·高 شىرىن اي گائو
- Born: Shirinay Gao; July 31, 1998 (age 28); Beijing, China
- Other name: Curley G
- Education: MacPherson Primary School; Dunman High School; Berklee College of Music
- Occupations: Singer; songwriter
- Musical career
- Genres: Pop; electropop
- Instrument: Vocals
- Years active: 2017–present
- Labels: Meng Xiang Qiang Yin (Dream Sound); Wajijiwa Entertainment (Note: As a member of BonBon Girls 303 only.)
- Formerly of: BonBon Girls 303

Chinese name
- Traditional Chinese: 希林娜依·高
- Simplified Chinese: 希林娜依·高
Transcriptions
Standard Mandarin
- Hanyu Pinyin: Xī Lín Nà Yī · Gāo

Xilinnayi Gao (Chinese: 希林娜依·高; pinyin: Xīlínnàyī·Gāo; Uyghur: شىرىن اي گائو Shirinay Gaw; born July 31, 1998), professionally known by her stage name Curley G or Curley Gao, is a Chinese singer-songwriter. She first gained attention in 2017 on the Chinese singing competition show Sing! China. In 2020, she participated in the survival show Produce Camp 2020, finishing first and debuting as the center of the girl group BonBon Girls 303. She was selected as the leader of BonBon Girls 303. In July 2022, she released her first EP to mark the beginning of her solo career.

== Early life ==
Curley Gao was born on July 31, 1998, in Beijing, China. She is the only daughter of a Han Chinese father from Beijing and a Uighur mother from Xinjiang; her surname Gao is a common Han Chinese surname, while her parents decided to give her an Uighur first name, Shirinay, which is transcribed in Pinyin as "Xilinnayi".

She was raised in Beijing until the age of 9 and later moved to Singapore with her parents. In Singapore, she attended MacPherson Primary School and Dunman High School. In the United States, attending Berklee School of Music, she took on the English name "Curley". She started learning piano as a child and has passed ABRSM Grade 8 piano. In 2012, she finished as a finalist in the songwriting competition Eco Music Challenge with her song This Is Our Paradise. She also wrote a few songs and released them on her SoundCloud when she was in middle and high school.

== Career ==
=== 2016–2019: Sing! China and college life ===
Curley Gao auditioned for Sing! China season 1 in 2016 but did not make it through the blind audition. She auditioned again for Sing! China season 2 in 2017 and eventually finished as runner-up of the team mentored by Na Ying.

After the show, she signed with 梦响强音. On December 18, 2017, she released her first song 惹哭自己 which was included in 梦想在望, the compilation album of fellow Sing! China contestants. She released several singles with 梦响强音 later, including 颗粒季, the first single written by herself.

In January 2019, she moved to Boston and began her study in Berklee College of Music. While in college, she collaborated with different producers and released several songs independently.

=== 2020–2022: Produce Camp 2020, BonBon Girls 303 ===
In early 2020, Curley Gao returned to China and appeared on Tencent's girl group survival show Produce Camp 2020. On July 4, She finished in first place and debuted as the center of BonBon Girls 303. Before the debut, her first EP 停不下来 was released when she was still on the show.

On August 11, 2020, it was announced that Curley Gao was elected as the team leader of BonBon Girls 303.

On August 12, her single 2030，我想对你说 (2030, I want to tell you) was released as the theme song of the United Nations 2020 International Youth Day Dialogue. She gave a speech titled 用克制生活换更好的未来 (Self-control for a better future) and performed the theme song live as one of the Chinese Youth Advocates for the United Nations Sustainable Development Goals at the event. On August 25, she released two special versions of the theme song for the 9th Fight Night of League of Legends, titled Fight of your life (English version) and 战斗的乐章 (Chinese version). She appeared on The Coming One: SUPER BAND on August 30 and collaborated with the band 水果星球 on an original song Stay With Me.

On September 26, she performed as a guest of Xiaoshenyang in the finale of Crossover Singer season 5. From October to December, she teamed up with Joey Yung in Dragon Television's singing competition show Our Song season 2, and the duo stayed for 6 episodes.

On December 16, the original soundtrack of TV drama Legend of Fei, which includes a song 红尘莫欺我年少 performed by Curley Gao, was released. Which later on January 19, 2021, Curley Gao won The Most Popular Film and TV OST Female Singer with 红尘莫欺我年少 on QQ Music Film and TV OST Popularity Awards 2020.

In January 2021, Curley Gao appeared on Tencent Video's variety show 令人心动的offer and Hunan Television's Happy Camp as a guest. In September 2021, Curley Gao participated on Masked Dancing King as "Naughty Boss (顽皮老板)". She proceeded to go to the final and won The Most Promising awards.

On January 4, 2022 Kappa China Official announced that Curley along with INTO1's Mika will be their Youth Ambassador. In March 2022, Curley joined The Treasured Voice 3rd Season as a participant. Curley Gao is also Coach Watch Brand Spokesperson. On July 4, 2022 BonBon Girls 303 had officially disbanded due to their contract. Curley wrote their final song as a bonus.

=== 2022–present: Solo Career ===
On midnight July 5, 2022, Curley Gao Studio announced her first EP 《吾》will be released on July 12.

On July 18, 2022, Curley Gao was appointed as Maybelline New York Brand Ambassador.

In 2024, she was featured as the singer for "Emberfire" for the Genshin Impact animated short "The Song Burning in the Embers", which was recorded by HOYO-MiX.

== Discography ==
=== Extended plays ===
List of extended plays, showing selected details, selected chart positions, and sales figures
Title	Details	Peak chart positions (TME Uni Chart)	Sales	ref
Title	Details	(TME Uni Chart)	Sales	ref
停不下来停不下来 Can't Stop	Released: June 28, 2020; Label: -; Formats: digital download, streaming; Track listing: 1. "停不下来 Can't Stop"; 2. "I Wanna Say"	—	CHN: —	
阿莫希林 Amoxcillin	Released: May 8, 2021; Label: Wajijiwa Entertainment; Formats: digital download, streaming; Track listing: 1. "阿莫希林 Amoxcillin"; 2. "Mirror"	—	CHN: —	
吾 Wu	Released: June 12, 2022; Label: Mengxiang Qiangyin; Formats: CD, digital download, streaming; Track listing: 1. "Masquerade 瑕面舞会"; 2. "Imaginary 幻想写照"; 3. "04:16"; 4. "Ting 来，你说"; 5. "Flight"	—	CHN: —	

=== Singles ===
- 希林娜依·高 refers to Curley G

Year	Date	Title	Lyrics	Music	Arrangement	Notes	Ref
2018	27 July	颗粒季	希林娜依·高	希林娜依·高	王乐汀	First original single	
2020	12 August	2030，我想对你说	New Chance/Tacey	New Chance/Tacey	New Chance/Tacey	Theme song of UN 2020 International Youth Day Dialogue	
2020	25 August	Fight of your life	Unisonar	Unisonar	Unisonar	Special version of the theme song of the 9th Fight Night of League of Legends	
2020	25 August	战斗的乐章	洛松维、庞博	Unisonar	Unisonar	Special Chinese version of the theme song of the 9th Fight Night of League of Legends	
2021	9 August	无限飞驰	earattack	earattack	earattack	NetEase's《王牌竞速》Ace Racer Pre-Season Theme Season	
2021	31 December	芳华如愿	林乔	高莹	陆泰名		
2022	April 26	精英不凡	何小熊/江珂/林嘻嘻@珈鸣音乐	Delarge@ NUMBER K/ LEE JUN@NUMBER K/ JAYDOPE@ NUMBER K/ONAIR@NUMBER K/ K. Chozen@NUMBERK	黎子琨/周以力	Game For Peace 3rd Anniversary Theme Song	
2022	April 28	那年星辰	林乔	赵佳霖	赵佳霖	-	
2022	June 5	对世界说你好	良朋	唐轶	伍威	2022 World Environment Day Theme Song	
2022	June 14	完美日	林乔/零	霍含蕾Rea	AST (a Stereo)		

=== Collaborations ===
- Curley or 希林娜依·高 refers to Curley G

Year	Date	Title	Album	Lyrics	Music	Arrangement	Notes	Ref
2018	24 November	Venti Life	The Moon	IDO$/希林娜依·高	IDO$	unknown	performance with IDO$	
2018	18 August	Do You Think About Me	non-album single	Ken Gao	Ken Gao	unknown	solo performance	
2019	21 December	Love Me Slowly	non-album single	Curley G	Curley G	Ryuk	solo performance	
2019	7 December	夜昼	non-album single	希林娜依·高	LuckyMaxx/希林娜依·高	LuckyMaxx	solo performance	
2019	1 December	U	non-album single	希林娜依·高	Sugar/希林娜依·高	Sugar	solo performance	
2019	27 November	Black	₩ of a kind	IDO$/Curley	IDO$/Curley	unknown	performance with IDO$	
2019	21 October	Fade Out	non-album single	Curley G	LuckyMaxx/Curley G	LuckyMaxx	solo performance	
2019	24 September	Follow You	non-album single	Sugar/Curley G	Sugar/Curley G	unknown	solo performance	
2019	31 May	Lost Dreams	non-album single	希林娜依·高	希林娜依·高	AyAno	solo performance	
2019	22 March	别对我说谎 (Don't Lie To Me)	non-album single	吴琪萱	吴琪萱 李栋楠	吴琪萱	solo performance	
2020	30 August	Stay With Me	The Coming One: SUPER BAND	张旸/希林娜依·高	张旸	NIA杨心予/张子涵/ Neo牛晖/水果星球	performed with 水果星球	
2021	2 December	小丑的眼泪 Tears of a Clown	你好大学声校园厂牌作品集	王艺格	王艺格	杨格	performed with 王艺格	
2021	30 December	顺着风的方向 Towards Winds of Direction	non-album single	飞行少年/ 芬达/ 小卫	小卫/ 飞行少年	小卫 @Dokodemo Door	Performed with Lisi Danni	
2022	April 8	向阳	明日来信（青年音乐文化发展计划·五四合辑）	洋尘@JBS Music	杨语荞@JBS Music	陶云霏	Performed with 郑云龙 ，王艺格 ，义掌柜	
2024	September 6	Are You Happy Now	non-album single	unknown	R3HAB/Crazy Donkey/NS-R	Dazhi Jin/Dino Medanhodzic/R3HAB/Lewis Hughes/Nicholas Audino	Performed with R3HAB and Crazy Donkey	

=== Soundtrack appearances ===
Year	Date	Title	Lyrics	Music	Arrangement	Notes
2020	16 December	红尘莫欺我年少	张靖怡	刘炫豆	马原	From the soundtrack of TV drama Legend of Fei
2021	19 July	摩天轮是傻瓜 feat. Zhang Zhehan	唐恬	李吉吉@Project Ace	编曲:郑楠@SBMS Beijing	'The Day We Lit Up The Sky' Movie OST featuring Zhang Zhehan
2021	25 July	点亮世界	赵瑞麟(Ruilin Zhao)	何美臻(Min He)	何美臻(Min He)	'Monster in The Forbidden City' OST (Tencent Kids Animation)
2021	28 July	陷入爱情 feat. INTO1's Mika	张赢	石杨	罗锟	'You Are My Glory' Drama Soundtrack
2021	14 September	牵一双手 (Holding Hands)	钱雷	钱雷	钱雷	关于我妈的一切 All About My Mother
2021	30 November	寂静之忆 Memory of Last Life	陈嬛	邱彦诚	吴思毅	良言写意 Lie to Love OST
2021	22 December	为我们失去的	唐恬	钱雷	钱雷	穿过寒冬拥抱你 Embrace Again OST
2022	April 24	寓言	陈曦	陈曦	闫天午	'Master of My Own' Ending Theme Song
2022	May 14	那一天的我	李暨青	段炼	冒振瑶@TalentUnion	'When You Be Me' Soundtrack
2022	July 20	唯我念	文芃芃/ 占逸君/ 郑兆麟	黄雨田	Juno Heo @ Finn music	《一念永恒》Animation Ending Theme Song
2023		I Always Love You	劉恩汛		Jellysound	'The Love You Give Me' Soundtrack
2023	September 8	云泥	顾晓声	晨云若水	晨云若水	'My Journey to You' Soundtrack
2024	April 18	Emberfire	三寶, 项柳	HOYO-MiX	Yang Lee	Genshin Impact Single
2024	September 24	誓言	岑思源, 史念彤	岑思源	陆泰名	'Love of Nirvana' Soundtrack
2024	October 22	焰	任菲菲, 落落	任菲菲	任菲菲	'Kill Me Love Me' Soundtrack
2024	November 6	人间有时	廖羽	王梓同	胡博	'The Story of Pearl Girl' Soundtrack
2025	January 1	怎知	周洁颖	胡小鸥	胡小鸥	'Guardians of the Dafeng' Soundtrack
2025		掌纹				'Seven Relics of Ill Omen' Soundtrack
2025	August 6	月如歌 (Moon Like Song)	Zhang Pengpeng, Jin Dazhou	Jin Dazhou	金大洲	Opening theme song of Legend of The Female General
2025	October 8	红尘客	周洁颖	胡小鸥	周一	'Yummy Yummy Yummy' Soundtrack
	Jun 28	Dark Dream (《诡秘之主小丑篇》动画 片尾曲)				Lord of Mysteries Season 1 Ending theme

=== Promotional songs ===
Year	Date	Title	Lyrics	Music	Arrangement	Notes
2021	12 February	青春六百年	胡志敏	彭重远	YE	Beijing Forbidden City promotional song
2022	22 April	天地开卷				2022 World Book Day (no official release on music platform yet)

=== Songs from Produce Camp 2020 ===
Year	Date	Title	Lyrics	Music	Arrangement	Notes
2020	4 July	火羽 Phoenix	吕易秋	KIM MYEONG KYU; HANYE	KIM MYEONG KYU 许荣臻	Episode 10 (finale), group performance
2020	27 June	这是我一直想对你说的话	吕易秋	郑楠	郑楠	Episode 8, group performance
2020	27 June	Ice Queen	易水寒	Anne Judith Stokke Wik; Ronny Vidar Svendsen; LIONCHLD	LIONCHLD; Dsign Music 许荣臻	Episode 8, group performance

=== Sing! China single collections ===
Year	Date	Title	Album	Notes
2020	8 February	世界为你醒来	世界为你醒来	Charity song by contestants of Sing! China and The Voice of China (ensemble)
2019	1 May	我最美的新疆	也许有一天	Solo performance in single collection by contestants of Sing! China
2018	12 July	梦的方向	non-album single	In support of The Voice of China 2018 (ensemble)
2018	14 March	越夜越醒着	梦想在望2	Solo performance in single collection by contestants of Sing! China
2017	18 December	惹哭自己	梦想在望	Solo performance in single collection by contestants of Sing! China

=== Other original songs ===
Year	Date	Title	Notes
2017	14 November	Apeirophobia	Uploaded to NetEase Music
2017	2 July	Love Hate Relationship	Uploaded to SoundCloud
2016	17 January	I'll Look At You	Uploaded to SoundCloud
2015	20 July	Guitar With A Broken String	Uploaded to YouTube and SoundCloud
2012	unknown	This Is Our Paradise	Submitted to Eco Music Challenge

== Filmography ==
=== Television shows ===
Year	English Title	Chinese Title	Network	Notes	ref
2017	Sing! China Season 2	中国新歌声 2	Zhejiang TV	Contestant (eliminated at ep 10)	
2020	Produce Camp 2020 / Chuang 2020	创造营2020	Tencent Video	Contestant at 1st place	
2020	Our Song: Season 2	我們的歌 2	Dragon TV	Contestant	
2020	BON-US		Tencent Video	Member	
2021	Irresistible Offer: Season 2	令人心动的offer 2	Tencent Video	Panelist (ep 9, 10)	
2021	Our Song Spring Festival	我們的歌	Dragon TV	Member	
2021	Youth and Melody		Dragon TV	Contestant, Chuang Family Representative	
2021	Masked Dancing King S2	蒙面舞王 S2	Jiangshu TV	Contestant (September 19, 26; October 3, 10), The Most Potential Dancer	
2022	The Treasured Voice S3	天赐的声音 S3	Zhejiang TV	Participant (Ep.1-3), has one "Golden Song"	
2022	It Sounds Delicious	听说很好吃	Zhejiang TV	好吃创意人	
2022	Sing! China 2022	中国新歌声2022	Zhejiang TV	Youth Mentor	

== Awards and nominations ==
Year	Award ceremony	Awards	Result	Ref
2021	General Selection to HIT New Mandarin Singers	HIT Chinese Song Rankings 2020	Won	
2021	QQ Music 2020 Awards	Most Popular OST Singer	Won	
2022	Tencent Entertainment White Paper	Annual Emerging Singer	Won	
