= Desperate (Daphne Khoo album) =

Studio album by Daphne Khoo
- Released: December 2007
- Recorded: 2006–2007 in Singapore
- Genre: Alternative rock Indie rock Power pop
- Length: 43:56
- Label: Self released Unsigned
- Producer: Daphne Khoo; Amir Masoh; Leonard Soosay; Alan Khoo; Denise Khoo

Daphne Khoo chronology
Shooting Stars (2004)	Desperate (2007)

Singles from Desperate
- 1. "Doll"; 2. "Desperate"

Professional ratings
Review scores
Source	Rating
CD Baby	3/5 stars
Allmusic	3/5 stars
The Straits Times Life! Section	3/5 stars

Desperate is the official debut studio album of Daphne Khoo. It was released in December 2007. It contains the singles "Doll" and "Desperate". It is well received in Southeast Asia, Singapore.

== Track listing ==
1. "Doll"
2. "Desperate"
3. "Wrong"
4. "J-tusk"
5. "Tribute"
6. "Little Love Song"
7. "Charlene"
8. "Rescue"
9. "That Song"
10. "Letting Go"
11. "Bleeding Tears"
12. "Doll (radio edit)"
