= Desperate =

Desperate may refer to:

- Despair (emotion), a feeling of hopelessness
- Desperate (film), a 1947 suspense film directed by Anthony Mann
- Desperate (Divinyls album), a 1983 album by Australian rock group Divinyls
- Desperate (Daphne Khoo album), the 2007 debut album of Daphne Khoo, or its title track
- "Desperate", a song by South Korean boy group VIXX from Kratos (EP)
- "Desperate", a 2009 song by David Archuleta from David Archuleta (album)
- "Desperate", a 2010 song by Fireflight from For Those Who Wait
- "Desperate", a song by Jonas Blue from his 2018 album Blue
- "Desperate", a 2023 song by Neffex
- "Desperate", a 2001 song by Suburban Legends from Suburban Legends
- "Desperate (Jamie MacDonald song)", a 2025 song by Jamie MacDonald
- "The Desperate", a 2016 song by Owen from The King of Whys

== See also ==
- Despair (disambiguation)
