= Shooting Stars (Singaporean TV series) =

Drama series

Shooting Stars is a television drama series spun off from the Singapore Idol singing competition in 2005, starring some of the top idols of that year. The cast includes Taufik Batisah, Sylvester Sim, Olinda Cho, Daphne Khoo, Jeassea K. Thyidor, Alfarahizah Awangnit, David Wu, Brendon Lim, and Maylene Loo. The show premiered on 9 August 2005 and ended on 11 October 2005.

== Synopsis ==
When renowned songwriter and performer George comes to a crossroad in his life, he looks to nurturing a successor amongst the young talents he teaches. Sly, Taufik, Jeassea, Olinda, and Daphne meet by chance to study under George's tutelage, and they each come with their own set of aspirations, struggles, and obstacles.

Striving beyond their adversities and learning to accept differences along the way, the youths learn the rudiments of singing. As the art becomes a common language through George's eccentric but patient guidance, the five troubled youths find their own directions and celebrate their common passion for music.

== Cast and characters ==
- Taufik Batisah as himself. Batisah plays a pizza delivery boy who struggles to balance the realities of life with his dreams of singing. With an overly pragmatic girlfriend who expects an idealistic future together without understanding his love for music, he envies and views well-heeled best friend Aaron as having a great life. Talented and with a keen sense of music, Taufik will discover his capacity for freedom from music classes.
- Sylvester Sim as himself. Sylverster is a coffee shop owner's son and assistant who is brooding and quiet. He pines for his longtime love interest Dawn but lacks the courage to express his feelings. While concerned about his widowed father, Sylvester is adamant about pursuing his dream of music, despite his dad's indignant efforts to get him to take over his stall. His willingness to brave any storm for party-animal Dawn ends in disastrous outcomes.
- Olinda Cho as herself. Olinda is a tomboy who stumbles along each day, with no real aim in life. With nothing to worry about and a well-provided life, Olinda hides an insecure self beneath a nonchalant attitude. She especially flounders when issues of human relationship crop up.
- Daphne Khoo as herself. Daphne is a mechanical engineering student who is forced by her karaoke-champion mum to join a singing class. She struggles to meet her mother's high expectations, however. Forced to join a singing class, Daphne drags a good friend along, who, leaning on his good looks to steal her thunder, threatens their future class attendance as they face up to the possibilities of being kicked out.
- Jeassea K. Thyidor as herself. Jeassea is an Indonesian housewife who fills the gaps in her leisurely life with a singing course while her rich husband is away. All is fun in class as she learns from her idol George until she finds out a twisted secret about her husband.
- Alfarahizah Awangnit plays Su, Taufik's girlfriend. Materialistic and yearning for a better life, Su ignores Taufik's dreams of singing, only urging him to upgrade himself. Her ultimate goal is to have a big house, expensive car, and a luxurious life.
- David Wu as the group's music teacher, George. Eccentric and at a crossroads, he is searching for a protégé to groom so that he may take a backseat.
- Brendon Lim as Aaron, the well-heeled best friend of Taufik, who shares his love for boxing. While Taufik perceives suave Aaron as being the rich and lucky half of the two, Aaron in truth leads a controlled life that leaves little freedom for his own dreams.
- Maylene Loo as Sim's girlfriend, Dawn. She runs from her problems by indulging in dangerous drugs-and-alcohol cocktails. Unknowingly attracting Sim into her dark life to protect herself from her own party-animal lifestyle, she allows Sim into her heart and becomes intimate with him.
- Brandon Wong as a gang leader who harasses Dawn and later rapes her; he will eventually be injured by Sim.
- Jimmy Taenaka as Tjeng, the rich husband of Jeassea who is often away on overseas business trips
- Nathaniel Ho as Ethan, the best friend of Khoo who encourages her to overcome her fear prior to the singing competition.
- David Aw as Jack, a longtime friend of Cho whom she has a crush on
- Michelle Ng as Evangelina

== Episode guide ==
=== Episode 1 ===
At a crossroad in his life, George, a renowned songwriter and performer, begins nurturing hopes of grooming a successor. He gathers a group of young dreamers, and together, each with a different agenda, they set out to find out more about themselves and those who about them. Through his eccentric yet patient guidance, George helps his students blossom from rebellious adolescents into sensitive young adults, as singing becomes their shared passion.

=== Episode 2 ===
Taufik has a keen interest as well as the talent for singing. He wants to attend George's classes, so he takes a second job in order to pay for them. His mother takes matters into her own hands and goes to George with the promise that she will pay Taufik's fees in installments. She plans to sell curry puffs to raise the money. Touched, George decides to accept the boy. Taufik's girlfriend, Su, and his best friend, Aaron, do not get along. Su wants Taufik to be realistic about his goals; she thinks a frivolous singing class is a waste of money. Aaron, on the other hand, believes Taufik should chase his dream.

=== Episode 3 ===
Taufik has to work out his relationship issues with Su, balance two jobs, and help Aaron train for a boxing match. Su becomes increasingly unhappy with Taufik, who has little time for her. She turns to ex, Iskandar. Iskandar wants to take care of Su, but she is still in love with Taufik. Yet, she gradually comes to realise that Iskandar is the kind of guy she has always wanted Taufik to be—stable and practical.

=== Episode 4 ===
Sylvester gets into trouble with a gang. Bruised, he is late for class. Taufik shows his concern, but Sylvester reveals nothing. George looks on in disapproval and chides them. At home, Sylvester's father asks about his bruise. After receiving a phone call, Sylvester rushes to a club to look for Dawn, his love interest. Dawn has caught her boyfriend kissing another girl. She gets drunk and cries on Sylvester's shoulder, who decides to bring her home. As he takes care of her, he tries to express his feelings. They end up kissing, spending the night together. Sylvester wakes up late the next day, with Dawn already gone. He can hardly concentrate at work as he tries in vain to contact her. Sylvester looks for Dawn at her workplace, only to find out she is dating another guy. Dawn is shocked to see Sylvester, but he disappears before she can make any explanation. At a coffee shop that night, Dawn clarifies that the night they spent together was a mistake; she wants to remain friends. Dawn leaves, only to be cornered by the same gang who beat up Sylvester, to whom she owes money. Threatened by her creditors to pay up, she calls Sylvester for help. He resorts to taking cash from his father's coffee shop.

=== Episode 5 ===
Mr. Sim is furious when he realizes Sylvester has taken all the money from the coffee shop's cash box, and he raids Sylvester's room, looking for it. During singing class, Taufik asks Sylvester to write him a song and is invited to his house to work on it. They are shocked to see the state of Sylvester's room—all his things, including his beloved guitar, have been smashed to pieces. Mr. Sim eventually softens, when he sees fresh bruises on Sylvester. Dawn finally tells Sylvester the truth about what happened. Both feel their friendship has progressed, but she is worried about landing him in trouble again. After they part, Dawn is caught by her creditors again. Unable to pay up, she is raped. Sylvester subsequently confronts the gang leader and smashes a beer bottle over his head. He then tries in vain to contact Dawn. Unable to face him, she writes him a letter and checks into a rehab centre, leaving him no clues as to her whereabouts. While trying to obtain a CD player to listen to a CD he found in Sylvester's room, Mr. Sim is knocked down by a car. Sylvester rushes to the hospital. Shocked to find his CD by the bed, he struggles to come to terms with his father's love for him. As Sylvester helps his father run the coffee shop and takes care of him, they come to a mutual understanding and develop a new-found bond.

=== Episode 6 ===
Daphne has a fear of singing in front of crowds. Her mother, Mavis, on the other hand, is a former karaoke champion who takes every chance to showcase her daughter's talent. Mavis is unable to resist the opportunity to compete when she hears that her rival, Eileen, has signed up her daughter, Evangelina, for an annual karaoke competition. Mavis declares to her family that she has signed up Daphne as well. Agitated, Daphne quarrels with her. At school, she confides in her best friend, Ethan. He advises her to stop letting her fear conquer her mind. When Mavis resorts to emotional blackmail, Daphne gives in. Unable to turn back to Ethan, she seeks George's help. He encourages her to think of someone special when she gets stage fright. On the day of the competition, Daphne almost backs out when faced with the garish ball gown Mavis wants her to wear. After much encouragement and support from her father, however, she plucks up the courage to carry on. The power goes out just as Daphne is about to sing, and she panics. Thankfully, Ethan is there to pass her a guitar and reassure her. Recalling George's advice, she sings beautifully.

=== Episode 7 ===
Olinda is a young adult struggling with her identity. Her life changes when her childhood crush, Jack, returns from Australia to visit her. Olinda recalls how she is always pressured to look as good as her sister, Celia. At dinner, her father, Robert, instructs both daughters to help out at his cake shop that week. Both are reluctant but are given no choice. To the girls' surprise, the baker, Nakata, is an attractive Japanese man. Olinda starts fantasizing about him in various romantic scenarios. Jack asks Celia out on a date and confesses his love for Olinda. Celia agrees to play matchmaker. Celia tells Olinda that Jack is leaving the country. Meanwhile, Jack arrives with flowers and a new image. He overhears Olinda saying she will never fall for a wimp like him.

=== Episode 8 ===
Olinda realizes Jack has overheard her. She wallows in self-pity, until her mother encourages her to make the first move and apologize. Feeling helpless after nightmares of Jack leaving, Olinda seeks help from George. Finally, she expresses her feelings for Jack through singing. The two reconcile and make an appointment for a date. The couple tries to have dinner at an expensive restaurant. However, they can't bear the stiff atmosphere and decide to take it easy and revert to their everyday, casual style. At the end of a lovely evening, they kiss goodnight like shy teenagers. Olinda comes back to class a new and recharged person.

=== Episode 9 ===
Cast aside by her businessman husband Tjeng in favour of his work, Jeassea yearns for a more meaningful life. With Tjeng travelling frequently to Indonesia, the desperate housewife fills her days with frivolous shopping escapades and high-tea sessions. Salvation comes in the form of music when she signs up for one of George's singing classes. When Jeassea is invited to sing at a jazz club, George gives her extra lessons. Over time, their friendship deepens. At home, things worsen when Tjeng's business crumbles. The couple's marriage deteriorates further with Jeassea's suspicion that Tjeng is having an affair with his business partner. In the midst of her problems, Jeassea develops a crush on George. Fortunately, both are able to control their emotions. With his support, she gets a chance to perform at a high-end jazz club.

=== Episode 10 ===
George decides to bring the singing course to a close. Instead of holding a usual lesson, he takes his students to a long, suspended bridge and tells them to cross it blindfolded. His last lesson has to do with overcoming fear. Taufik imagines his mother's encouraging voice to shake off his fear of losing his own voice. Sylvester drowns out the doubt in his head by singing the song he has composed for Dawn. Daphne panics but imagines Ethan at the end of the bridge and moves on eagerly. Jeassea lets go of her self-consciousness and struts across the bridge. Olinda gives George a cheeky grin and runs across. Watching them cheering each other from afar, a proud George decides it is time he left them to grow on their own. Two years pass. The five budding talents have remained good friends. Jeassea is actively raising funds for orphans at a children's home. Taufik is a recognized singer. Sylvester has become a well-known composer. Daphne is a DJ at her polytechnic school. Ethan finally asks her to be his girlfriend. Cho is successfully managing her father's cake shop and is happily attached to Jack. The five friends meet up. Jeassea asks Taufik to help sing at a fundraising concert. He agrees, and the rest decide to contribute as well. On the day of the concert, the five put on a successful performance, unaware that George is in the audience.

== Reception ==
According to Today, Shooting Stars had the highest-rated debut for an English-language television drama in Singapore since 2001.
