= Mount Despair =

Mount Despair may refer to:

- Mount Despair (Montana) in Glacier National Park (U.S.)
- Mount Despair (Victoria) in Victoria, Australia
- Mount Despair (Washington) in North Cascades National Park
