= Olinda Cho =

Singaporean singer (born 1980)

- Born: 24 May 1980 (age 46); Singapore
- Education: Saint Hilda's Secondary School
- Occupations: Singer; songwriter; actress; entrepreneur
- Years active: 2004–present
- Musical career
- Genres: Pop; Mandopop
- Instrument: Vocals
- Website: Olinda TV Channel on Facebook

Chinese name
- Traditional Chinese: 卓猶燕
- Simplified Chinese: 卓犹燕
- Hanyu Pinyin: Zhuó Yóuyàn

Olinda Cho Yu Yen (born 24 May 1980) is a Singaporean singer, actress and entrepreneur.

== Career ==
Cho emerged as the second runner-up of the first season of Singapore Idol in 2004.

Cho released her debut album, Rewind, in October 2007. She also rearranged songs including the Singapore national anthem, Majulah Singapura, which was broadcast for Starhub's national day commercial, Majulah Moms.

In 2016, Cho participated in the Singaporean audition for the first season of Sing! China, and emerged as the winner for the Singapore stop.

Cho was approached directly by Sing! China to participate in the second season in 2017. She performed "不能说的秘密" during the blind audition and won Na Ying, Liu Huan and Jay Chou's votes. She joined Jay Chou's team and became one of the top 4 contestants.

In 2025, Cho auditioned for the fourth season of Midlife, Sing & Shine and ranked as 14th place.

== Business ventures ==
In September 2013, Cho started a modelling agency, NU Models, with Sheila Sim.

During the COVID-19 pandemic, Cho switched to selling premium fruits.

In September 2023, it was reported that Cho is currently in charge of training Uzbekistan's beauty pageant would-be contestants, and holds a National Director position for the role.

== Discography ==
=== Studio albums ===
- Rewind (2007)

== Filmography ==
=== Television series ===
- Shooting Stars (2005)
