= Despair (sculpture) =

Sculpture by Auguste Rodin

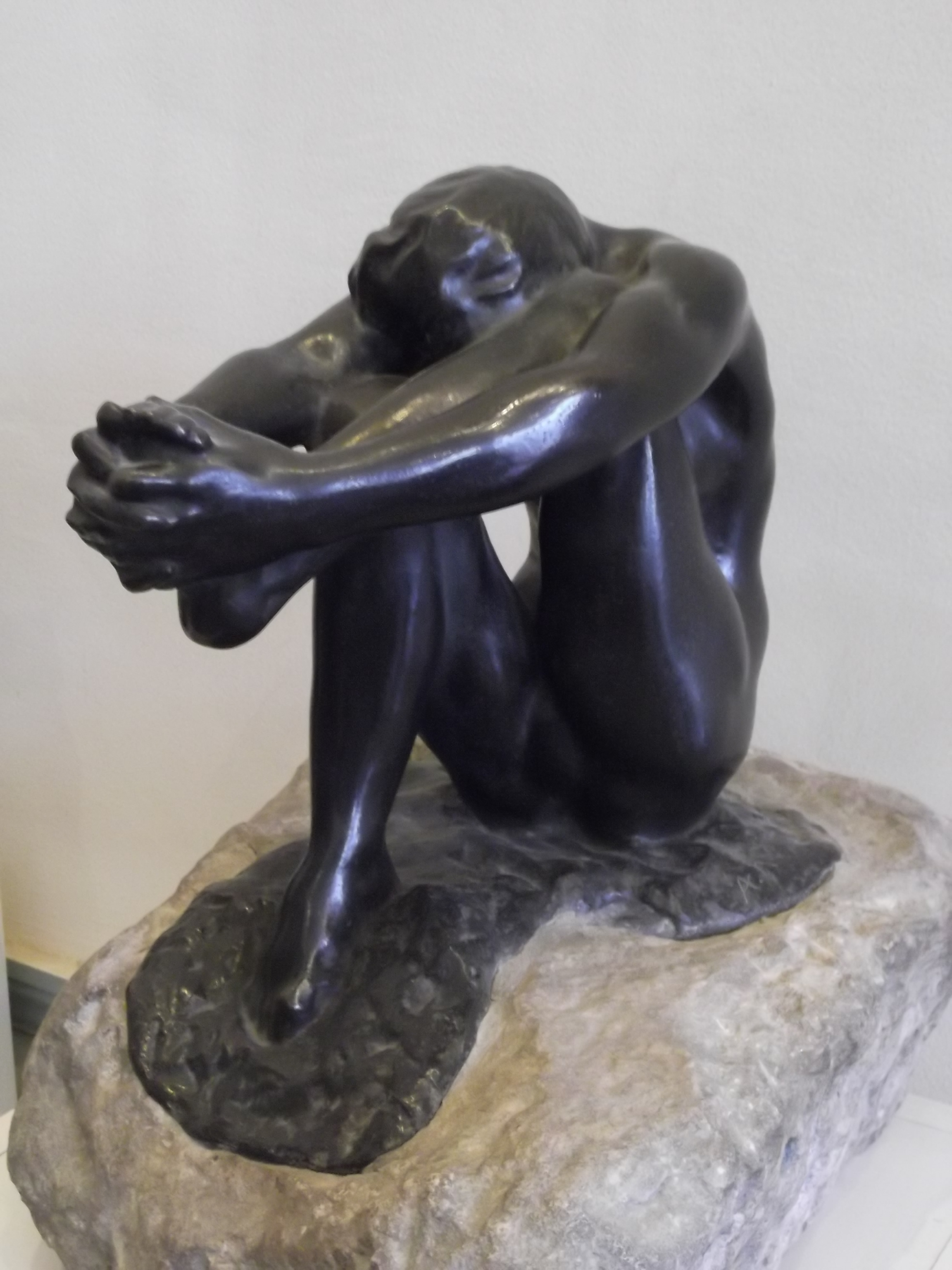
- A bronze cast of the sculpture in a marble base at the Musée Rodin
- Artist: Auguste Rodin
- Year: c. 1890

Despair (French: Le Désespoir) or Despair at the Gate (French: Désespoir de la Porte) is a sculpture by Auguste Rodin that he conceived and developed from the early 1880s to c. 1890 as part of his The Gates of Hell project. The figure belongs to a company of damned souls found in the nine circles of Hell described by Dante in The Divine Comedy. Other title variations are Shade Holding her Foot, Woman Holding Her Foot, and Desperation (French: Les Désespérés). There are numerous versions of this work executed as both plaster and bronze casts and carved marble and limestone.

== History and description ==
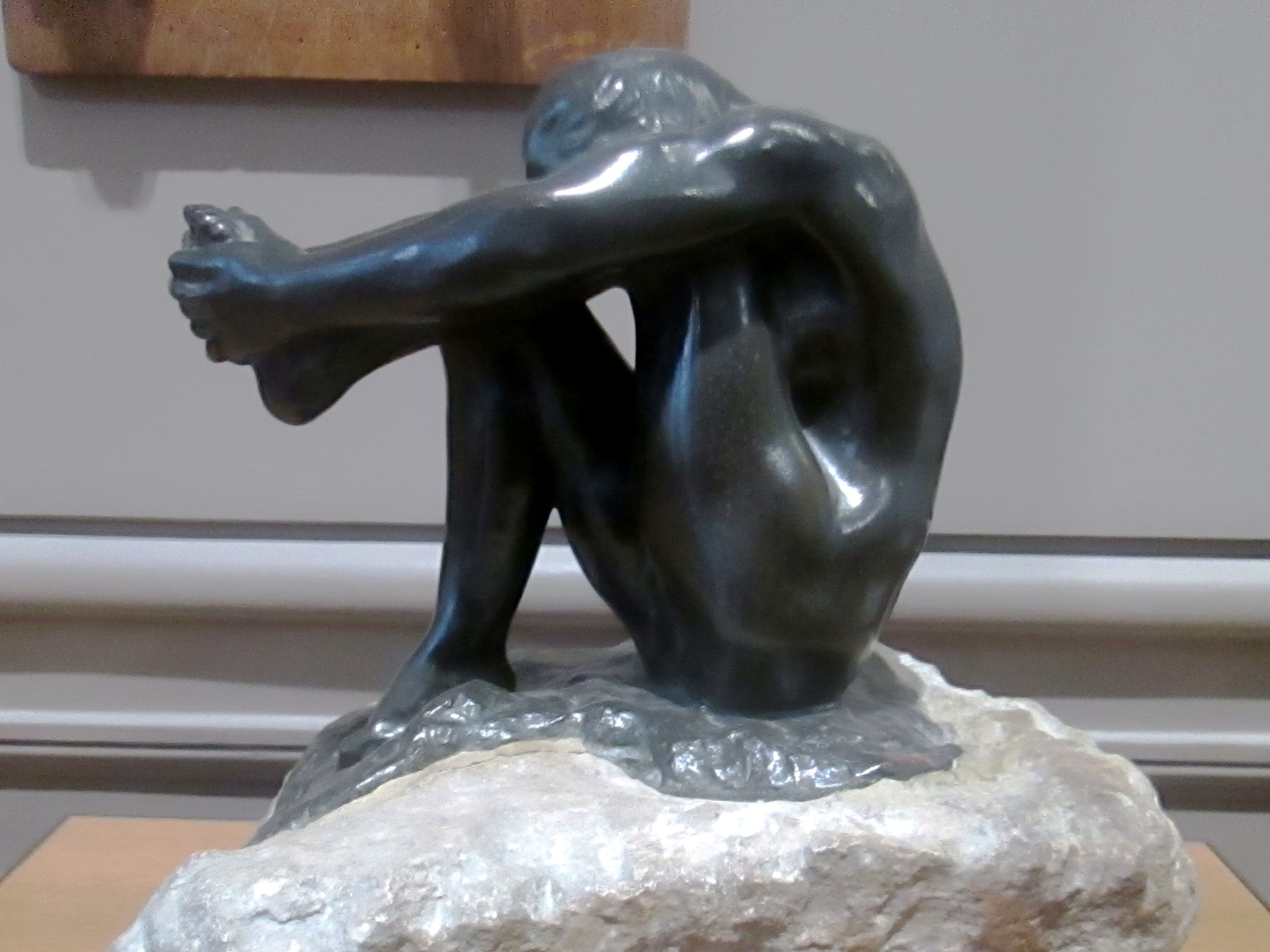
The work viewed from the side highlighting its triangular elements

In the 1880s, Rodin created an initial version that was more upright and whose extended leg was almost vertical. This version of the figure appears several times in the right panel of The Gates of Hell. Rodin returned to the figure around 1890. This time, the woman's extended leg is horizontal and she is clasping her left foot with both hands. This version of the figure is found in the upper left panel of The Gates of Hell.

When it was first exhibited as a stand-alone work, the statue was named Shade Holding Her Foot. However, the unusual acrobatic pose doesn't correspond to any passage in The Divine Comedy or any other work of literature. It is more likely that Rodin just captured a moment when a tired model was stretching to relax her neck or back. When viewed from the side, the figure suggests a truss with triangular units.

It wasn't until 1900 that Rodin began describing the work as Despair.

After being sold at an auction in 1906, a marble version of the work vanished from the public record. It was rediscovered in 2025, when the Comité Rodin confirmed the authenticity of a sculpture that had previously been assumed to be a copy.

== Copies ==
There are over a dozen versions of the work in several mediums at the Musée Rodin. Other copies of the work can be found at:

- Victoria and Albert Museum, London
- Metropolitan Museum of Art, New York
- Maryhill Museum of Art, Maryhill, Washington
- Brooklyn Museum, New York
- National Museum of Western Art, Tokyo
- Stanford University, Stanford, California
- Rodin Museum, Philadelphia

== See also ==
- List of sculptures by Auguste Rodin
