= The Crossing (Joker Xue album) =

Studio album by Joker Xue
- Released: November 28, 2017
- Recorded: 2017
- Genre: Mandopop
- Length: 42:29
- Language: Mandarin
- Label: Huayu World Expo; Chaoshi Music
- Producer: Zheng Wei

Joker Xue chronology
Beginner (2016)	The Crossing (2017)	Freak (2018)

The Crossing (Chinese: 渡) is the eighth album by Chinese singer-songwriter Joker Xue. It was released on November 28, 2017, by Huayu World Expo and later acquired by Xue's own label Chaoshi Music.

== Background ==
The concept behind The Crossing is a reflection of life and living as one crosses from childhood to adulthood, from one role to the next, and from yesterday to today. This album marks a shift in Xue's music from emotional ballads about heartbreak to examinations and critique of the darker side of human nature.

== Composition ==
Of the ten tracks on the album, Xue composed music for five tracks and wrote lyrics for nine tracks. The only song he did not participate in creating was "Camel" which was written by Gan Shijia and composed by Guo Ding, both had collaborated with Xue on Several Of..., An Unexpected Journey, and Beginner.

Xue has stated that "Noble", a song exploring the twistedness of values and emotions under societal pressures, is one of the song he's satisfied with. Despite many people thinking he was writing about himself, he clarified that it is about "a group of people who are in pain."

"The Crossing" is a cover version of "Here She Comes Again" by the Norwegian electronic music duo Röyksopp. Xue penned the Chinese lyrics, sharing "insights into his life experiences and his analysis of himself" to the audience through his words.

There are three original soundtrack songs on this album: "Like the Wind" for the historical drama series I Will Never Let You Go, "The Martian Has Come" for season two of the variety show "Mars Intelligence Agency", and "I'm Afraid" for the drama series "Boy Hood".

== Reception ==
The Crossing was the top-selling album on YinYueTai in mainland China in 2017. "Ambiguous" ranked tenth on KuGou Music's Top 500 list in August 2017.

On TME Physical Album Annual Sales Chart, launched in 2021, The Crossing continued to appear top 50 despite being released years ago, ranking 38th in 2023, 43th in 2024, and ranked 44th in 2025.

This album signified a breakthrough in Xue's musical style, shifting away from the "Xue Style Love Songs" he was known and sometimes critiqued for. The Crossing, with songs of different styles such as "Animal World", "Camel", "Noble", "I'm Afraid", and "The Martian Has Come", told a "a grand urban fable."

== Track listing ==
Track listing for The Crossing
No.	Title	Lyrics	Music	Length
1.	"Animal World (动物世界)"	Joker Xue	Guo Ding	3:50
2.	"Ambiguous (暧昧)"	Joker Xue	Joker Xue	5:12
3.	"Like the Wind (像风一样)"	Joker Xue	Joker Xue	4:15
4.	"Noble (高尚)"	Joker Xue	Zhou Yili	5:18
5.	"Camel (骆驼)"	Gan Shijia	Guo Ding	4:36
6.	"Don't (别)"	Joker Xue	Joker Xue	3:35
7.	"The Martian Has Come (火星人来过)"	Joker Xue	Han Xingzhou	3:36
8.	"Hand Behind the Back (背过手)"	Joker Xue	Joker Xue	4:26
9.	"The Crossing (渡)"	Joker Xue	Röyksopp	3:33
10.	"I'm Afraid (我害怕)"	Joker Xue	Joker Xue	4:08
Total length:				42:29

== Accolades ==
Awards and nominations
Award	Year	Category	Nominee	Result	Ref.
Enchanting Dragon and Tiger Chart 醉心龙虎榜	2017	Top Hit of the Year 年度顶尖金曲	"Animal World"	Won	
Freshasia Music Awards 亚洲新歌榜年度盛典	2017	Music Video of the Year 年度MV	"Animal World"	Nominated	
Global Chinese Music Awards 全球华语歌曲排行榜颁奖典礼	2017	Top 20 Hits of the Year 年度二十大金曲奖	"I'm Afraid"	Won	
Migu Music Awards 音乐盛典咪咕汇	2017	Album of the Year 年度最佳专辑	The Crossing	Won	
Migu Music Awards 音乐盛典咪咕汇	2017	Top 10 Hits of the Year 年度十大金曲	"Noble"	Won	
China Music Awards 全球华语音乐榜中榜颁奖典礼	2018	Best Album (Mainland) 最佳专辑(内地)	The Crossing	Won	
Chinese Top Ten Music Awards 东方风云榜颁奖典礼	2018	Top 10 Hits of the Year 年度十大金曲	"Ambiguous"	Won	
Global Chinese Golden Chart Awards 全球流行音乐金榜颁奖典礼	2018	Canadian Chinese Radio Top Artist 加拿大中文电台点播冠军	"Animal World"	Won	
Global Chinese Golden Chart Awards 全球流行音乐金榜颁奖典礼	2018	Top 20 Hits of the Year 年度二十大金曲	"Animal World"	Won	
Q China Annual Music Ceremony; Q China 年度音乐盛典	2019	Best Album of the Year 年度最佳专辑	The Crossing	Won	
