= Live Concert in Shanghai =

2008 concert by Joker Xue

- Associated album: Jacky (薛之謙); How Are You? (你過得好嗎); Deeply Loved You (深深爱过你)
- Date(s): December 20, 2008
- No. of shows: 1
- Attendance: 5,000

concert chronology
- Live Concert in Shanghai (谦年传说) （2008）; I Think I've Seen You Somewhere Tour （2017）

Live Concert in Shanghai is the first solo concert by Chinese singer-songwriter Joker Xue, held on December 20, 2008, at the Shanghai International Gymnastic Center. Xue performed his own music as well as covered songs by other artists. The concert attracted 5,000 people.

== Background ==
The concert was originally scheduled for November 29, 2008. However, due to severe throat inflammation that almost made Xue lose his voice, it was postpone December 20, 2008. Xue revealed in an interview that in addition to singing some tracks from the new album, there will also be several classics and choreography.

Xue is the first native Shanghai singer to hold a large-scale concert in the city. At the press conference, Xue shared that the production team, band, and backup dancers are all based on Shanghai because he wants everyone to pay attention to the local music culture. Many former contestants of "My Style, My Show", the singing competition show where Xue debuted, attended in person to show their support. In addition, Xue's friends were also present to cheer him on.

== Live album ==
Originally, Xue's company had no plans to release a live album of the concert. Fans, however, showed extremely high interest and demanded its release. The live album "Live Concert in Shanghai 2008" was released on August 26, 2009.

22 songs were included on the album; however, not all songs performed were included on the album. The excluded songs were two cover songs "One Thousand Years Later" (一千年以后) and "Love Has No Choice" (情非得已).

=== Track list ===
- 1. Intro (开场)
- 2. Allure (倾城)
- 3. Women in the World of Mortals (红尘女子)
- 4. Memory
- 5. Arctic Snow (北极雪)
- 6. Do You Love Me or Him? (爱我还是他)
- 7. MY SHOW
- 8. LET U GO
- 9. Circus Clown (马戏小丑)
- 10. Ruyi Jingu Bang (金箍棒)
- 11. The Return of the Prince (王子归来)
- 12. Battle of the Galaxy (星河之役)
- 13. Our World (我们的世界)
- 14. The Expiration of Love (爱的期限)
- 15. How Are You? (你过的好吗)
- 16. Legend (传说)
- 17. To My Lover (给我的爱人)
- 18. Awakened (梦醒了)
- 19. It Turns Out You Don't Want Anything (原来你什么都不想要)
- 20. Kiss Goodbye (吻别)
- 21. Love You Deeply (深深爱过你)
- 22. Yellow Maple Leaves (黄色枫叶)
- 23. Serious Snow (认真的雪)
