= Dust in the World =

2020 online concert by Joker Xue

- Associated album: Dust (尘)
- Date: May 23, 2020
- No. of shows: 1
- Attendance: 3,389,500

concert chronology
- Skyscraper World Tour (2018–2019); Dust in the World （2020）; Extraterrestrial World Tour (2021–2025)

Dust in the World was an online concert by Chinese singer-songwriter Joker Xue. It was live-streamed exclusively on May 23, 2020, at 7:30pm via Baidu's smart home device Xiaodu. As of May 18, the number of reservations for the concert was 3,389,500.

== Background ==
Dust in the World was a collaboration between Taihe Rye Music and Xiaodu, the first ever between a record company and artificial intelligence hardware system, with the goal of creating a unique IP for the music industry. The concert featured an "AI Concert Living Room", a live interactive segment made possible by "Xiaodu AI Music Chart".

Though simplified Chinese characters are typically used in China, the character for "Dust" is in traditional Chinese (塵) on the promotional materials.

== Concert design ==
After careful analysis and discussion, the production team for Dust in the World decided on a "MV-style immersive performance" experience for the concert. To achieve this goal, they utilized multiple cameras to live stream the concert from different angles. Lighting design included equipment such as ACME XP-16R BSW, XA-1000 BSWF II, LED-ST5000, and LED-BL4.

The four-sided stage design was adopted because no live audience was present due to COVID-19 lockdown in China. However, unlike traditional four-sided stage design of concerts, Xue was position in the center of the stage with the band facing him to increase interactivity. The filming team used crane shot and Steadicam as well as post-production video processing methods during the real-time live broadcasts.

To craft an immersive experience for the audience, each of the eight songs had custom lighting design to tell its story. Examples include incorporating golden specks of light for the song "Dust" and projecting the image of a bed for two on the stage while Xue performed "Mocking" from a curled up position to portray the loneliness.

== Set list ==
1. Morbidity (病态)
2. Like the Wind (像风一样)
3. Puppet (木偶人)
4. Gentleman (绅士)
5. Dust (尘)
6. Actor (演员)
7. Mocking (笑场)
8. Forsaken Youth (违背的青春)

== Personnel ==
- Director and production team: Luka Interactive Entertainment V STUDIO TEAM team
- Chief director: Zhao Bochong
- Executive chief director: Ma Mengzhu
- Stage director: Xu Keming, Zhang Xuefei
- VJ: Yang Qiang
- Host director: Yang Jiepu
- Lighting design: Zhou Cheng
- Director: Wang Shaobo
- OB sound engineer: Jin Ying, Wang Luyao
- Monitor sound engineer: Zuo Xin
- Stage lighting: ACME Lighting
- Hardware production: 2496 Top Music
