= I Think I've Seen You Somewhere Tour =

2017 concert tour by Joker Xue

- Location: China
- Associated album: An Unexpected Journey (意外); Beginner (初學者)
- Start date: April 22, 2017
- End date: July 22, 2017
- No. of shows: 10
- Attendance: 100,000

concert chronology
- Live Concert in Shanghai (2008); I Think I've Seen You Somewhere Tour （2017）; Skyscraper World Tour (2018–2019)

The I Think I've Seen You Somewhere Tour is the first concert tour by Chinese singer-songwriter Joker Xue. The tour kicked off at Dalian Sports Center on April 22, 2017, and concluded at Chongqing International Expo Center on July 22, 2017. Total attendance is more than 100,000.

== Background ==
On April 6, 2017, at the tour announcement press conference, Xue shared his interpretation of concert (演唱会): 演 means acting, 唱 means singing, and 会 means meeting; the concert will incorporate all three elements to create "a unique music story."

== Concert Synopsis ==
Nearly a decade after Xue's last concert, he returned with I Think I've Seen You Somewhere tour, named after the song off of the album Beginner and served as the concept for the tour. Inspired by his own life, Xue brought the numerous roles he held (restaurant owner, actor, comedian, singer...etc.) over the past ten years to the stage. Through a 40-minute stage play in the second half, each role gradually disappeared until only the role of a singer remained, symbolizing Xue's ultimate dream realized and dedication to his music.

== Commercial performance ==
In the April 2017 Top 10 Concert Index, Xue's Shenzhen stop ranked second with a comprehensive index of 153.2, the first being Jacky Cheung. On May 9, when tickets for the Shanghai stop went on sale, the ticket sales website crashed from the high volume of traffic. Among the 2017 Top 10 Concert Box Office Ranking, "I Think I've Seen You Somewhere" came in second of all mainland China performers and ninth of all Chinese performers.

== Setlist ==
- Beginner (初学者)
- Child (小孩)
- Just Right (刚刚好)
- Half (一半)
- The Return of the Prince (王子归来)
- An Unexpected Journey (意外)
- Yellow Maple Leaves (黄色枫叶)
- Ugly (丑八怪)
- It's Raining (下雨了)
- I Think I've Seen You Somewhere (我好像在哪见过你)
- Radius Around You (方圆几里)
- Gentleman (绅士)
- Actor (演员)
- Circus Clown (马戏小丑)
- The Martian Has Come (火星人来过)
- Noble (高尚)
- Animal World (动物世界)
- Actually (其实)
- I Finally Became Someone Else's Woman (我终于成了别人的女人)
- What Do You Want From Me (你还要我怎样)
- Ambiguous (暧昧)
- Serious Snow (认真的雪)
- Thank You To Those Who Love Me (爱我的人谢谢你)
- Anhe Bridge (安河桥): Only performed on June 10 in Shanghai, fulfilling the promise he once made to ex-wife Leixin Gao.

== Tour dates ==
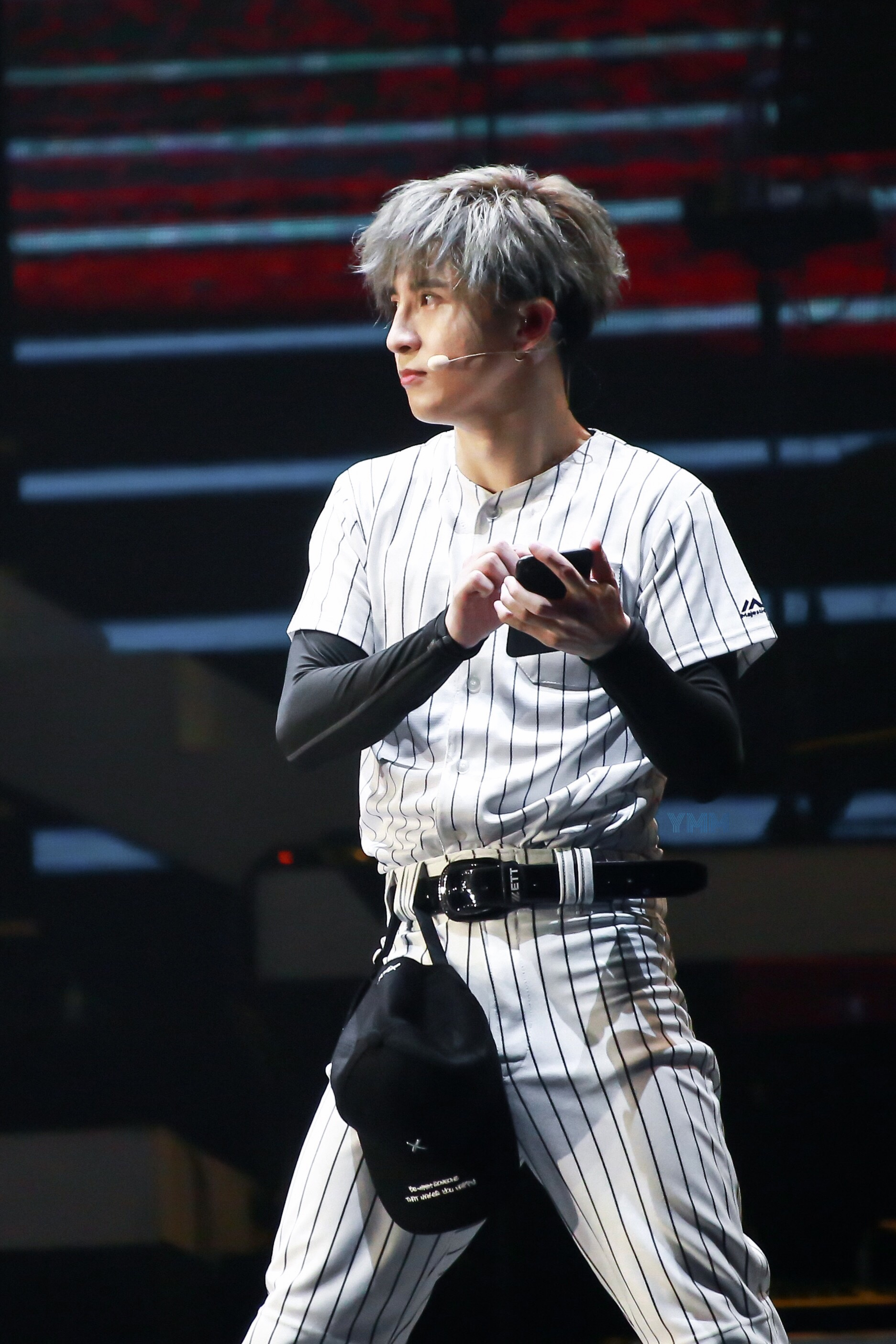
Xue, reprising his role in Boyhood, as part of the I Think I've Seen You Somewhere tour

Date	City	Venue
April 22, 2017	Dalian	Dalian Sports Center
April 29, 2017	Shenzhen	Shenzhen Bay Sports Centre
May 20, 2017	Qingdao	Guoxin Gymnasium
June 3, 2017	Guangzhou	Guangzhou International Sports Arena
June 10, 2017	Shanghai	Mercedes-Benz Arena
June 17, 2017	Beijing	Cadillac Arena
June 24, 2017	Wuhan	Wuhan Sports Center
July 9, 2017	Kunming	Kunming Int'l Convention & Exhibition Center
July 15, 2017	Nanjing	Nanjing Olympic Sports Centre
July 22, 2017	Chongqing	Chongqing International Expo Centre

== Special guests ==
- April 22, Dalian: Zhu Zhen
- April 29, Shenzhen: Jackson Yee
- May 20, Qingdao: Huang Xiaoming
- June 3, Guangzhou: Sha Yi & Angei
- June 10, Shanghai: Jane Zhang
- June 17, Beijing: Jeff Chang
- June 24, Wuhan: Lala Hsu
- July 9, Kunming: Julius Liu
- July 15, Nanjing: Wowkie Zhang
- July 22, Chongqing: Hua Chenyu
