= Douyin Online Concert: Ke =

2023 online concert by Joker Xue

Douyin Online Concert: Ke (可)
- Tour by Joker Xue
- Associated album: Countless (无数)
- Date: February 3, 2023
- No. of shows: 1
- Attendance: 36,271,000

Joker Xue concert chronology
- Extraterrestrial World Tour (2021–2025); Douyin Online Concert: Ke （2023）; The King of Beasts Tour (2026–)

Douyin Online Concert: Ke is the second online concert by Chinese singer-songwriter Joker Xue. It was live-streamed on February 3, 2023, at 8:00pm via Douyin from Starpark's Starlight Studio #2 in Beijing, sponsored by Junlebao Dairy Group.

The concert is 146 minutes long. 36,271,000 viewers watched the concert and the number of views exceeded 160,000,000 with peak number of viewers reaching 939,000 and the average number of viewers reaching 580,000.

== Background ==
Ke, 可, carries multiple meanings in Chinese and each of them was an inspiration for Xue's online concert. From the director Zhao Bochong: It means "approve (可以)" which gives encouragement and validation, it means "but (可是)" which allows for a chance to consider different choices and grow, it means "possibility (可能)" which promises new things in the future. It also means "can" as the synopsis for the concert reads: This time, no matter where you are, you can meet him online.

Prior to the concert, fans participated in an online wish list poll for which songs they'd like Xue to perform at the concert with "Countless" (无数) was the top choice. Xue performed a total of 12 songs, the same as the number of albums he has released.

== Concert synopsis ==
The concert incorporated lantern riddles to transition between segments, a thematic choice as the concert is right before Lantern Festival, and viewers were invited to submit their answers in comments. An interview area was set up, with Xue's 12 albums as the backdrop, for Xue to participate in the riddles as well as discuss his musical journey over the past 18 years with the host and other guests. Throughout the concert, Xue peppered in humorous interaction with the crew and the band, both to liven the atmosphere and to highlight their contributions. There was also an Easter egg at the end of the concert

== Track list ==
- 1. Freak (怪咖)
- 2. Extraterrestrial (天外来物)
- 3. I Think I've Seen You Somewhere (我好像在哪见过你)
- 4. Actor (演员)
- 5. Like the Wind (像风一样)
- 6. Villain (反派角色)
- 7. Serious Snow (认真的雪)
- 8. Gentleman (绅士)
- 9. What Do You Want From Me (你还要我怎样)
- 10. Actually (其实)
- 11. But (可)
- 12. Countless (无数)

== Special guests ==
- Li Hao, host.
- Jace Guo, performed "Villain" (反派角色)
- Jane Zhang, performed "But" (可) with Xue

== Personnel ==
- Production team: V STUDIO TEAM
- Chief director: Zhao Bochong
- Executive director: Zhang Xuefei
- Visual director: Lü Li, Xu Keming
- Stage director: Wang Chunsen
- Stage design: Liao Dingmin
- Visual design: V STUDIO TEAM VIDEO ART
- Monitor sound engineer: Zhang Xiaonian
- Broadcast sound engineer: Zhang Junjun
- Lighting design: Gao Shangjin, XSGY show team
- Television director: Wang Shaobo
