= Countless =

Studio album by Joker Xue
- Released: September 20, 2022
- Recorded: 2022
- Genre: Mandopop
- Length: 47:13
- Language: Mandarin
- Label: Chaoshi Music
- Producer: Joker Xue

Joker Xue chronology
Extraterrestrial (2019)	Countless (2022)	The Guardian (2024)

Countless (Chinese: 无数) is the twelfth album by Chinese singer-songwriter Joker Xue. It was released digitally on September 20. 2022, by Xue's own label Chaoshi Music. Presale for the physical version began on November 17, 2022.

== Background ==
Of the ten tracks on the album, Xue composed music for five tracks and wrote lyrics for seven tracks. The title track, "Countless", was written and composed by Xue. The arrangement builds up from low piano notes integrated with percussion, culminating in a powerful and unyielding atmosphere where one rushes forward fearlessly and uncompromisingly despite the countless obstacles in pursuit of countless possibilities.

The songs "You Are Not Alone" and "But" are collaborations with Jeff Chang and Jane Zhang, respectively. Zhang performed "But" with Xue as a special guest at Xue's Douyin Online Concert: Ke in February 2023 and at Xue's Extraterrestrial World Tour's third Beijing show in August 2023. "About You" is dedicated to Xue's mother, who died when he was 4, and released on his birthday.

"Waiting" is a cover of the song by Xue's good friend Zhao Yingjun, who died in February 2021. Zhao had expressed the wish of having an album of cover songs to hear his music through other artists' interpretation; Xue launched the project in August 2020 and the album A Song, a Story was released on September 17, 2020. "Waiting" is included on A Song, a Story, where thirteen of Zhao's songs are each covered by a different artist, and on Countless.

== Reception ==
All songs on the album peaked within the top ten spots on Tencent Music UNI chart, with the exception of "City of Luo", which peaked at 11.

Countless was number 2 on Tencent Music's 2022 Year-End Chart which ranks the albums based on the sum of the five highest scored songs on each album, and "But" was named one of the Top 10 Hits of the Year. On KuGou Music's year-end chart, Countless was among Top 10 Popular Albums and Xue was named one of Top 10 Artists of the Year and the Favorite Artist of Post-00s Generation.

On TME Physical Album Annual Sales Chart, Countless ranked 5th in 2022 and continued to appear on the list in 2023 (ranked 18th), 2024 (ranked 31st), and 2025 (ranked 35th).

== Track listing ==
Track listing for Countless
No.	Title	Lyrics	Music	Length
1.	"Countless (无数)"	Joker Xue	Joker Xue	5:30
2.	"Phoenix Feathers and Unicorn Horns (凤毛麟角)"	Jace Guo	Jace Guo	4:22
3.	"Turn Waste Into Treasure (变废为宝)"	Joker Xue/Chacha	Chacha	4:39
4.	"You Are Not Alone (你不是一个人)" (feat. Jeff Chang)	Joker Xue/James Hu	James Hu	4:24
5.	"But (可)" (feat. Jane Zhang)	Joker Xue	Joker Xue	4:40
6.	"Supporting Role (男二号)"	Joker Xue	Joker Xue	4:47
7.	"Waiting (守候)"	Zhao Yingjun	Zhao Yingjun	4:52
8.	"City of Luo (洛城)"	Gan Shijia	Joker Xue	4:58
9.	"Facade (被人)"	Joker Xue	Joker Xue/Jace Guo	4:08
10.	"About You (关于你)"	Joker Xue	Joker Xue	4:53
Total length:				47:13

== Accolades ==
Accolades for Countless
Year	Award	Category	Nominee	Result	Ref.
2021	Migu Music Awards 音乐盛典咪咕汇	Top 10 Hits of the Year 年度十大金曲	"Turning Waste Into Treasure"	Won	
2021	NetEase Cloud Music Awards 网易云年度音乐奖	Single of the Year 年度单曲奖	"Turning Waste Into Treasure"	Won	
2022	Asian Pop Music Awards 亚洲流行音乐大奖	Top 20 Albums of the Year 年度TOP20专辑	Countless	Won	
2022	Asian Pop Music Awards 亚洲流行音乐大奖	Top 20 Songs of the Year 年度TOP20金曲	"Countless"	Won	
2022	Asian Pop Music Awards 亚洲流行音乐大奖	People's Choice Award (Chinese) 大众选择奖(华语)	"Countless"	9th place	
2022	Asian Pop Music Awards 亚洲流行音乐大奖	Male Artist of the Year (Chinese) 最佳男歌手(华语)	Countless	Nominated	
2022	Asian Pop Music Awards 亚洲流行音乐大奖	Album of the Year (Chinese) 年度最佳专辑	Countless	Nominated	
2022	Asian Pop Music Awards 亚洲流行音乐大奖	Best Collaboration Single 最佳合作单曲	"But"	Nominated	
2022	NetEase Cloud Music Awards 网易云年度音乐奖	Album of the Year 年度专辑	Countless	Won	
2022	NetEase Cloud Music Awards 网易云年度音乐奖	Song of the Year 年度单曲奖	"But"	Won	
2023	Wave Music Awards 浪潮音乐大赏	Song of the Year 年度歌曲	"But"	Nominated	
2023	Wave Music Awards 浪潮音乐大赏	Album of the Year 年度专辑	Countless	Nominated	
2023	Wave Music Awards 浪潮音乐大赏	Producer of the Year 年度制作	Countless	Nominated	
2023	Wave Music Awards 浪潮音乐大赏	Male Artist of the Year 最佳男歌手	Countless	Nominated	
