= Animal World (song) =

Single by Joker Xue

from the album The Crossing
- Language: Mandarin
- Released: March 29, 2017
- Recorded: 2017
- Genre: Pop; R&B
- Length: 3:50
- Label: Ocean Butterflies; Chaoshi
- Songwriter(s): Joker Xue; Guo Ding
- Producer(s): Guo Ding

Joker Xue singles chronology
"Beginner" (2016)	"Animal World" (2017)	"Skyscrapers" (2018)

Music video
- "Animal World" on YouTube

"Animal World" (Chinese: 动物世界; pinyin: Dòngwùshìjiè) is a song by Chinese singer-songwriter Joker Xue. It was released on March 29, 2017 as a single under Ocean Butterflies then later included on his eighth studio album The Crossing (2017) under Huayu World Expo; both of which have been acquired by Xue's own label Chaoshi Music.

In June 2017, "Animal World" ranked first on Billboard Radio China Top 10 Chart.

== Background ==
"Animal World" was written by Xue, composed by Guo Ding, and mastered by Tom Coyne. XUe previously collaborated with Guo on Several Of..., An Unexpected Journey, and Beginner.

In 2017, Xue said "Noble" and "Animal World" were the two songs he was satisfied with. He chose not to elaborate on the meaning of the song because "everyone can understand it however they want." However, he did share that he thinks "the values of today's society are distorted, and the emotional views are also distorted," with the former referring to "Noble" and the latter referring to "Animal World."

== Music video ==
The music video for "Animal World" was presented in the style of film noir. It was directed by Jennifer Wu and starred Xue and Lin Chi-ling as a pair of lovers entangled in deception and betrayal. At the beginning of the music video, On the Origin of Species was shown, foreshadowing the music video ending where only the fittest will survive and echoing song's lyrics chorus where evolution was mentioned in different iterations.

The story unfolded in six different settings: the library, the office, the bar, the home, the hotel, the train platform. Lin starred as the boss's lover who fell for Xue. To be together, they plot to kill the boss. However, the boss found out about their affair and plan, but instead of exposing them, he turned them against each other by convincing the woman to help him fake his death so she could collect the money while hiring the man to kill the woman to take the money from her. In the end, they each placed their own interest first.

== Accolades ==
Awards and nominations for "Animal World"
Award	Year	Category	Nominee	Result	Ref.
Enchanting Dragon and Tiger Chart 醉心龙虎榜	2017	Top Hit of the Year 年度顶尖金曲	"Animal World"	Won	
Freshasia Music Awards 亚洲新歌榜年度盛典	2017	Music Video of the Year 年度MV	"Animal World"	Nominated	
Global Chinese Golden Chart Awards 全球流行音乐金榜颁奖典礼	2018	Canadian Chinese Radio Top Artist 加拿大中文电台点播冠军	"Animal World"	Won	
Global Chinese Golden Chart Awards 全球流行音乐金榜颁奖典礼	2018	Top 20 Hits of the Year 年度二十大金曲	"Animal World"	Won	

== Credits and personnel ==
- Joker Xue – lyrics, vocals
- Guo Ding – composition
- Chen Di – arrangement
- Tom Coyne - mastering engineer
- Jennifer Wu – director

== Release history ==
Release dates and formats
Region	Date	Format	Label
Various	March 29, 2017	Digital download; streaming	Ocean Butterflies
