= Skyscraper World Tour =

2018–2019 concert tour by Joker Xue

- Associated album: The Crossing (渡); Freak (怪咖)
- Start date: July 14, 2018
- End date: May 19, 2019
- No. of shows: 23
- Attendance: 400,000

concert chronology
- I Think I've Seen You Somewhere Tour (2017); Skyscraper World Tour (2018–2019); Dust in the World Online Concert (2020)

The Skyscraper World Tour is the second concert tour and first world tour held by Chinese singer-songwriter Joker Xue. Xue performed 23 shows across four continents with 15 shows in Asia, 1 show in Europe, 4 shows in North America, and 3 shows in Oceania.

All venues in Mainland China were upgraded from arena to stadium. The tour began on July 14, 2018, at Workers' Stadium in Beijing and concluded on May 19, 2019, at AsiaWorld–Arena in Hong Kong. Total attendance is approximately 400,000.

== Background ==
In 2017, Xue promised his fans that if they weren't able to meet at the I Think I've Seen You Somewhere Tour, he would meet them again on a bigger stage. In 2018, he fulfilled that promise with Skyscraper World Tour. Unlike his previous tour, there was no stage play element in the Skyscraper World Tour because of the change from arenas to stadiums, Xue was concerned about the audio quality of the larger outdoor venues.

Xue named his tour "Skyscraper" because, much like his own slow climb to fame, there is a metaphoric skyscraper in everyone's hearts that they wish to scale. Through his music and stage performance, Xue hoped to remind himself and the audience of their original aspirations while pursuing their dreams and not be consumed by greed. He explained the tour poster, where he is bent over and reaching for a tree sprout, the sprout is a symbol for the dreams and hopes we once had, and even though we are surrounded by skyscrapers in real life, we are still reaching for it.。

== Concert synopsis ==
Skyscraper World Tour is a reflection on greed, both internal and external, and analyzes the metaphorical skyscraper we sought to acquire. It consists of five parts:

1. Highlighting our greed and desire through songs such as "Skyscrapers" (摩天大楼) and "Ugly" (丑八怪);
2. Revealing the persistent loneliness underneath material comforts through songs such as "Fox" (狐狸) and "Animal World" (动物世界) along with exaggerated choreography;
3. Reflecting upon and eventually rejecting the skyscraper of greed through songs such as "I Think I've Seen You Somewhere" (我好像在哪见过你) and "What Do You Want From Me" (你还要我怎样);
4. Rediscovering our true selves and our younger innocence through songs such as "Serious Snow" (认真的雪);
5. Embarking on a new path forward through songs such as "Freak" (怪咖) and "Forsaken Youth" (违背的青春).

== Critical reception ==
Xue received praise for his performance for his "richly resonant voice that smouldered at its lower end and shimmered in its higher register" and "delicate yet intense" interpretation and performance of the songs. The strength of Xue's songwriting is also highlighted with "songs that draw one in with their sensitive observations." Another highlight was Xue's charismatic personality was showcased between songs as he shared anecdotes from the tour and playfully interacted with the audience.

The stage design featured floating light matrix and LED stacking design that are "cleverly combined" to created a three-dimensional effect that is "immersive and magnificent." Visual effects were "perfectly integrated" with the performance and presented "a visual spectacle that is bound to impress fans." The light sticks provided "a unique atmosphere that can only be experienced if you were in attendance."

Straits Times named the tour one of the best Asian concerts of 2018 and China Daily stated the "exploration of human nature, desire, and society is the real core of Skyscraper."

== Commercial performance ==
"Skyscraper World Tour" set the record for highest concert box office by a mainland China male singer. His four stops in North America all sold out. In Singapore, he filled every one of the 8,000 seats at the Singapore Indoor Stadium. After selling out the Kuala Lumpur show on February 16, an additional show was added on February 14 in Penang. The organizer of his Taipei concerts described the ticket sale for his two shows as "legendary" with more than 80% of the tickets sold upon release, even though Xue has never attended any promotional or public events in Taiwan and did not make any arrangements to promote this tour in Taiwan.

The London show, held on March 10, ranked 45 on Billboard's March 2019 boxscore list with $852,202, Xue is one of three Chinese artists on the list, behind JJ Lin at 15 and G.E.M. at 40. The Sydney show, held on April 7, ranked 33 on Billboard's April 2019 boxscore list with $1,228,720, the only entry by an Asian artist. His two shows in Taipei were estimated to bring the city NT$53.8 million in tourism revenue.

=== Consumer protection ===
Some concertgoers were unable to attend the Shenzhen show due to the large-scale suspension and delay of the Guangzhou-Shenzhen high-speed rail trains. As compensation, those with tickets for the Shenzhen show and Guangzhou-Shenzhen high-speed rail can submit them in exchange for comparable tickets for the Foshan concert.

=== Venue records ===
Year	Date	City	Venue	Record	Ref
2018	January 11	Los Angeles	Dolby Theatre	First Chinese singer to sell out all four levels	
2019	April 1	Melbourne	Melbourne Convention and Exhibition Centre	First Chinese male artist to perform at the top three venues in Australia and New Zealand	
2019	April 4	Auckland	The Trusts Arena	First Chinese male artist to perform at the top three venues in Australia and New Zealand	
2019	April 7	Sydney	Qudos Bank Arena	First Chinese male artist to perform at the top three venues in Australia and New Zealand	
2019	April 13–14	Taipei	Taipei Arena	First mainland China singer to perform two shows in a row	

== Setlist ==
- Skyscrapers (摩天大楼)
- Ugly (丑八怪)
- Beginner (初学者)
- Like the Wind (像风一样)
- Actor (演员)
- Fox (狐狸)
- Gentleman (绅士)
- Ambiguous (暧昧)
- Animal World (动物世界)
- I Think I've Seen You Somewhere (我好像在哪见过你)
- The Mute (啞巴)
- What Do You Want From Me (你还要我怎样)
- Hand Behind the Back (背过手)
- The Crossing (渡)
- Reckless (肆无忌惮)
- Serious Snow (认真的雪)
- The Best (最好)
- Half (一半)
- Just Right (剛剛好)
- Actually (其实)
- Radius Around You (方圆几里)
- Child (小孩)
- Yes or No (有没有)
- Camel (骆驼)
- An Unexpected Journey (意外)
- Freak (怪咖)
- Forsaken Youth (违背的青春)

== Special guests ==
- April 13, Taipei: Hebe Tien
- April 14, Taipei: Jacky Wu

== Tour dates ==
Date	City	Country	Venue
July 14, 2018	Beijing	China	Workers' Stadium
July 28, 2018	Shenzhen	China	Shenzhen Bay Sports Centre
August 11, 2018	Chengdu	China	Shuangliu Sports Centre
August 26, 2018	Foshan	China	Century Lotus Stadium
September 8, 2018	Hangzhou	China	Yellow Dragon Sports Center
September 21, 2018	Changsha	China	Helong Sports Center Stadium
September 30, 2018	Macau	China	Cotai Arena
October 6, 2018	Shanghai	China	Hongkou Football Stadium
October 7, 2018	Shanghai	China	Hongkou Football Stadium
November 3, 2018	Vancouver	Canada	Thunderbird Sports Centre
November 6, 2018	Toronto	Canada	Paramount Fine Foods Centre
November 9, 2018	San Jose	United States	San Jose Center for the Performing Arts
November 11, 2018	Los Angeles	United States	Dolby Theatre
November 17, 2018	Singapore		Singapore Indoor Stadium
February 14, 2019	Penang	Malaysia	SPICE Arena
February 16, 2019	Kuala Lumpur	Malaysia	Axiata Arena
March 10, 2019	London	England	Wembley Arena
April 1, 2019	Melbourne	Australia	Melbourne Convention and Exhibition Centre
April 4, 2019	Auckland	New Zealand	The Trusts Arena
April 7, 2019	Sydney	Australia	Qudos Bank Arena
April 13, 2019	Taipei	Taiwan	Taipei Arena
April 14, 2019	Taipei	Taiwan	Taipei Arena
May 19, 2019	Hong Kong	China	AsiaWorld–Arena
