= Extraterrestrial (album) =

Studio album by Joker Xue
- Released: December 31, 2020
- Recorded: 2020
- Genre: Mandopop
- Length: 42:02
- Language: Mandarin
- Label: Huayu World Expo; Chaoshi Music
- Producer: Joker Xue

Joker Xue chronology
Dust (2019)	Extraterrestrial (2020)	Countless (2022)

Extraterrestrial (Chinese: 天外来物) is the eleventh album by Chinese singer-songwriter Joker Xue. It was released on December 31, 2020 by Huayu World Expo and later acquired by Xue's own label Chaoshi Music.

== Background ==
Of the ten tracks on the album, Xue composed music for five tracks and wrote lyrics for six tracks. The lead single, "Extraterrestrial", has a pop rock style and utilizes a string arrangement. Xue said the meaning of the song, to him, is that there is someone in this world who is unique to you. It serves as the inspiration for and bookends the set list of Xue's Extraterrestrial World Tour.

The final three songs on the album were collaborations with other artists. "Exhausted" was written by Xue, composed by internet star Guo Chongming, and performed by both. "Small Sharp Point" was sung with Han Hong, and is a song reminiscing about the simplicity of love and asks the question "If all I had in my pocket is a single rose petal, would you still fall in love with me?" Track 10 "Paper Boat" was written and composed by Xue to serve as the ending theme for the wuxia drama Legend of Awakening. It was performed with Yisa Yu, who appeared in Golden Melody 2 with Xue in 2018 and said "I finally know why so many people like you, because you shine on stage" after watching Xue's cover of "One Man Show" by Valen Hsu.

== Reception ==
Extraterrestrial was number 2 on Tencent Music's 2020 Year-End Chart, which ranks the albums based on the sum of the five highest-scored songs on each album. "Extraterrestrial" was among the Top 10 Music Videos of the Year and the Top 10 Karaoke Songs of the Year while "Ambition" and "Paper Boat" were among Top 10 Movie Soundtrack of the Year and Top 10 Television Soundtrack of the Year, respectively.

All songs on the album peaked within the top fifteen spots on Tencent Music UNI Chart, with the exception of "Pan Jinlian", which peaked at 67. "Exhausted" was the highest charting song of the album, peaking at number 2. "Exhausted" ranked number 1 for two consecutive weeks on the Hit FM chart in December 2020.

Extraterrestrial won Album of the Year at Migu Music Awards and Xue won his second Artist of the Year award from CMIC Music Awards, becoming the first male artist to be recognized twice.

On TME Physical Album Annual Sales Chart, launched in 2021, Extraterrestrial ranked 58th in 2022 but then rose and continued to be in the top 20 in 2023 (ranked 17th), 2024 (ranked 16th), and 2025 (ranked 18th).

== Track listing ==
Track listing for Extraterrestrial
No.	Title	Lyrics	Music	Length
1.	"Extraterrestrial (天外来物)"	Joker Xue	Luo Xiaohei	4:17
2.	"Tardy (迟迟)"	Ziwang	Joker Xue/Zhou Yili	4:15
3.	"Criminal Record (把你揉碎捏成苹果)"	Fang Yi	Fang Yi	3:55
4.	"Ambition (野心)"	Joker Xue	Joker Xue	3:40
5.	"Lottery Ticket (彩券)"	Jace Guo	Jace Guo	4:35
6.	"Not Love Me (不爱我)"	Joker Xue	Joker Xue/ Wang Yuankun	4:24
7.	"Pan Jinlian (潘金莲)"	Zhao Yingjun	Zhao Yingjun	4:55
8.	"Exhausted (耗尽)" (feat. Guo Chongming)	Joker Xue	Guo Chongming	4:19
9.	"Small Sharp Point (小尖尖)" (feat. Han Hong)	Joker Xue	Juliet/Joker Xue	3:55
10.	"Paper Boat (纸船)" (feat. Yisa Yu)	Joker Xue	Joker Xue	4:07
Total length:				42:02

== Accolades ==
Accolades for Extraterrestrial
Award	Year	Category	Nominee	Result	Ref.
2020	Tencent Music Entertainment Awards 腾讯音乐娱乐盛典	Top 10 Hits of the Year 年度十大金曲	"Extraterrestrial"	Won	
2021	Asian Pop Music Awards 亚洲流行音乐大奖	Top 20 Albums of the Year 年度TOP20专辑	Extraterrestrial	Won	
2021	Asian Pop Music Awards 亚洲流行音乐大奖	Top 20 Songs of the Year 年度TOP20金曲	"Extraterrestrial"	Won	
2021	Asian Pop Music Awards 亚洲流行音乐大奖	People's Choice Award (Chinese) 大众选择奖(华语)	"Extraterrestrial"	2nd place	
2021	Asian Pop Music Awards 亚洲流行音乐大奖	Male Artist of the Year (Chinese) 最佳男歌手(华语)	Extraterrestrial	Nominated	
2021	Chinese Top Ten Music Awards 东方风云榜颁奖典礼	Top 10 Hits of the Year 年度十大金曲	"Extraterrestrial"	Won	
2021	CMIC Music Awards 唱工委音乐奖	Artist of the Year (Male) 年度男歌手	Extraterrestrial	Won	
2021	CMIC Music Awards 唱工委音乐奖	Song of the Year 年度歌曲	"Extraterrestrial"	Nominated	
2021	CMIC Music Awards 唱工委音乐奖	Best Mixing Project 最佳混音工程	"Paper Boat"	Nominated	
2021	CMIC Music Awards 唱工委音乐奖	Best Music Video 最佳音乐录影带	"Extraterrestrial"	Nominated	
2021	Migu Music Awards 音乐盛典咪咕汇	Album of the Year 年度专辑	Extraterrestrial	Won	
2021	Tencent Music Entertainment Awards 腾讯音乐娱乐盛典	Top 10 Hits of the Year 年度十大金曲	"Exhausted"	Won	
