= Deeply Loved You =

Studio album by Joker Xue
- Released: November 26, 2008
- Recorded: 2008
- Genre: Mandopop
- Length: 38:38
- Language: Mandarin
- Label: Shang Teng; Chaoshi Music

Joker Xue chronology
How Are You (2007)	Deeply Loved You (2008)	Unfinished Songs (2009)

Deeply Loved You (Chinese: 深深爱过你) is the third album by Chinese singer-songwriter Joker Xue. It was released on November 26, 2008, by Shang Teng and later acquired by Xue's own label Chaoshi Music.

== Background ==
Of the ten tracks on the album, Xue composed music for seven and wrote lyrics for six.

"Deeply Loved You" has two different versions, one set in the past life featuring classical sounds and one set in the present life featuring more modern melody. Both version had its own music video, a first in Mandopop, and together told the story of two lovers from their past life in the early 1900s to their present life in 2008.

The album contains a diversity of genres, such as the adaptation of the popular Korean dance song "Let You Go" and the Chinese-style "Legend".

"Origin of the Dream" was adapted from "Once Upon a Time in Zurich" on How Are You? as a tribute to Olympic athletes and Xue himself served as a torchbearer for the 2008 Summer Olympics torch relay.

== Reception ==
Deeply Loved You was a commercial success, prompting Shang Teng to release an upgraded commemorative album in April 2009 with bonus features from Xue's first concert, Live Concert in Shanghai. It was a critical success as well, with Xue receiving an unprecedented seven nominations from Beijing Pop Music Awards for his work on the album.

"Deeply Loved You" and "Our World" charted first on Beijing Music Radio Chart for the week of 27 November 2008 and the week of 1 February 2009, respectively.

"Legend" impressed Shinji Tanimura and earned Xue an invitation to the Asia Music Festival in Osaka.

== Track listing ==
Track listing for Deeply Loved You
No.	Title	Lyrics	Music	Length
1.	"Legend (传说)"	Joker Xue	Joker Xue	4:33
2.	"Deeply Loved You (Past Life) (深深爱过你 (前世))"	Joker Xue	Joker Xue	4:38
3.	"Let You Go"	Wen Ya	E-Tribe	2:42
4.	"To My Lover (给我的爱人)"	Joker Xue	Joker Xue	4:45
5.	"Our World (我们的世界)"	Joker Xue	Joker Xue	4:14
6.	"Shooting Star's Tears (流星的眼泪)"	Joker Xue	Joker Xue	4:42
7.	"Battle of the Galaxy (星河之役)"	Chen Yaochuan	Garden	3:43
8.	"Deeply Loved You (Present Life) (深深爱过你 (今生))"	Joker Xue	Joker Xue	4:17
9.	"Origin of the Dream (梦开始的原点)"	Chen Yaochuan	Joker Xue	4:52
Total length:				38:38

== Accolades ==
Awards and nominations
Award	Year	Category	Work	Result	Ref.
Beijing Pop Music Awards 北京流行音乐典礼	2009	Top 20 Hits of the Year 二十大金曲	"Deeply Loved You"	Won	
Beijing Pop Music Awards 北京流行音乐典礼	2009	Album of the Year 年度最佳专辑	Deeply Loved You	Nominated	
Beijing Pop Music Awards 北京流行音乐典礼	2009	Album Producer of the Year 年度最佳专辑制作人	Deeply Loved You	Nominated	
Beijing Pop Music Awards 北京流行音乐典礼	2009	Singer-Songwriter of the Year 年度最佳创作歌手	Deeply Loved You	Nominated	
Beijing Pop Music Awards 北京流行音乐典礼	2009	Top Hit of the Year 年度金曲	"Legend"	Nominated	
China Original Song Award 中國原創歌曲獎	2009	Best Album (Mainland) 内地最佳专辑奖	Deeply Loved You	Won	
Global Chinese Music Awards 全球华语歌曲排行榜颁奖典礼	2009	Top Hit of the Year 年度金曲奖	"Deeply Loved You"	Won	
