= Ziwang =

Chinese actress and model (born 1991)

- Born: Bing Yi; July 14, 1991 (age 34); China, Tianjin
- Occupation(s): Actress, commercial model
- Years active: 2013–present

Chinese name
- Traditional Chinese: 子望
- Simplified Chinese: 子望
Transcriptions
- Musical career
- Also known as: Bing Yi, Ziwang
- Origin: China

Ziwang (Chinese: 子望, born July 14, 1991, China, Tianjin) is a Chinese actress and model.

She is an Internet celebrity, book writer who is popular with her humorous clips, appeared on Kuai GIF (Chinese GIF apps) in 2013, so far by June 2016, she has attracted 1.36 million fans on Kuai GIF. On Sina Weibo, Ziwang is also widely acclaimed, by September 2016, she has over two million fans. In 2015, she was recruited by a talent group "Miss Like" by Like Media and made appearances in many commercials films and television. May, 2017, as an actress, she participated in shooting Joker Xue's new released single mv <Ambiguous Love (暧昧)>. September, 2017, she attended the Zhejiang TV show as an honour guest.

== Filmography ==
=== Film ===
Year	English Title	Chinese Title	Role	Notes
2016	The Last Wulin	最后的武林	Lu Xinna(陆芯娜) main actress	2017/02/24
2016	Survivor	猎魂	Qian Siqi(钱思齐) main actress	nominated in the 40th Montreal World Film Festival
2016	The General Store	颜值杂货铺		2017/3/24
2017	How to Train Your Girlfriend	洛溪的养成计划	Luo Xi(洛溪) main actress	
2017		双生灵探	Female Reporter	2017/7/29

=== Television ===
Year	English Title	Chinese Title	Role	Notes
2016	Simple Man	微能力者	Lin Xinjie(林心洁)	online on TencentVideo on November 9th 2016

=== Music video appearances ===
Year	Title	Artist
2017	Ambiguous Love (暧昧)	Joker Xue

== Works ==
=== Collections ===
- 《痴心见多了，就喜欢你》". (June, 2017)

== Action ==
- November, 2015, Ziwang is the representative of Miss Like attending the Golive Global Ceremony.
- December, 2015, she participated in the big star show program "Who am I" by Youku.
- February, 2017, she got champion in the "Who's Still Standing?" 一站到底 by Jiangsu Television.
- May,2017, as an actress, she participated in shooting Joker Xue's new released single mv "<Ambiguous Love (暧昧)>".
- September, 2017, she attend in the TV show program "向上吧诗词" by Zhejiang Television.

== Links ==
- 子望's SinaWeibo
- 子望's Instagram
- 子望's Baidu’s online user forum
