= Freak (Joker Xue album) =

Studio album by Joker Xue
- Released: December 31, 2018
- Recorded: 2018
- Genre: Mandopop
- Length: 43:42
- Language: Mandarin
- Label: Huayu World Expo; Chaoshi Music
- Producer: Joker Xue, Zhang Zhenhao, Fang Yi, Guo Ding, Zhou Yili, Liu Zhou, Zheng Wei, Jin Zhiwen

Joker Xue chronology
The Crossing (2017)	Freak (2018)	Dust (2019)

Freak (Chinese: 怪咖) is the ninth album by Chinese singer-songwriter Joker Xue. It was released digitally on December 31, 2018, by Huayu World Expo and later acquired by Xue's own label Chaoshi Music. Presale for the physical album began on March 7, 2019.

== Background ==
"What is a freak?" That is the question at the core of this album's concept. Through his music, Xue observes and analyzes the world from multiple angles then conveys his findings through strong visual symbols and different musical styles. Say hello to your inner freak and don't worry about the noise.

== Composition ==
Of the ten tracks on the album, Xue composed music for five tracks and wrote lyrics for nine tracks. The song "Skyscrapers" served as the theme of Xue's Skyscraper World Tour.

Four tracks were created while on the variety show Infinite Song Season where musicians were paired with non-musicians to create songs based on a decided topic. "Wake Up (Live)" was created with Yue Yunpeng. "Freak" was written and composed by Xue while Yang Di adapted Yuki Hsu's "Monster (怪兽)" as a prelude for their performance.

Xue improvised the chorus of "Talent" while on the show; after it received a lot of attention and requests from netizens for Xue to finish it, Xue completed the song. "The Mute", composed and written by Silence Wang, was originally sung by Liu Wei; Xue rewrote and rearranged the song when he covered it on the show then later included his version on the album. Xue insisted on paying and crediting Wang for the song, even though Wang initially had refused because Xue only kept one line from the original version but Xue insisted that "even if only one line is used, it is still used."

== Reception ==
On Tencent Music UNI Chart, "Forsaken Youth" peaked at #3 and "Talent" ranked #1 for two consecutive weeks. "Talent" was named the Most Popular Single on NetEase Cloud Music's 2018 annual music chart.

On TME Physical Album Annual Sales Chart, launched in 2021 and three years after the album's release, Freak ranked 91st in 2022 but then rose and continued to be in the top 50 in 2023 (ranked 45th), 2024 (ranked 47th), and 2025 (ranked 47th).

== Track listing ==
Track listing for Freak
No.	Title	Lyrics	Music	Length
1.	"Skyscrapers (摩天大楼)"	Joker Xue	Tang Hanxiao	3:53
2.	"Freak (怪咖)"	Joker Xue	Joker Xue	4:12
3.	"Reckless (肆无忌惮)"	Joker Xue	Zhang Zhenhao	4:22
4.	"Fox (狐狸)"	Joker Xue	Zhou Yili	3:57
5.	"Talent (天份)"	Joker Xue	Joker Xue	4:10
6.	"The Best (最好)"	Xiaohan/Liao Huiming/Guo Ding	Lin Qiyu/Guo Ding	4:17
7.	"Wake Up (醒来)" (Live, feat. Yue Yunpeng)	Joker Xue/Yue Yunpeng	Joker Xue	4:19
8.	"The Mute (哑巴)"	Joker Xue/Silence Wang	Joker Xue/Silence Wang	4:23
9.	"Life After You Left Beijing (那是你离开了北京的生活)"	Joker Xue	Fang Yi	4:30
10.	"Forsaken Youth (违背的青春)"	Joker Xue	Joker Xue	5:38
Total length:				43:42

== Accolades ==
Awards and nominations
Award	Year	Category	Nominee	Result	Ref.
Global Chinese Pop Chart 华人歌曲音乐盛典	2018	Top Hit of the Year 年度金曲	"Skyscrapers"	Won	
Migu Music Awards 音乐盛典咪咕汇	2018	Top 10 Hits of the Year 年度十大金曲	"Skyscrapers"	Won	
Canadian Chinese Pop Music Awards 加拿大至 HIT 中文歌曲排行榜	2019	Top 10 Mandarin Singles of the Year 至 HIT 推崇國語十大歌曲	"The Mute"	Won	
CMIC Music Awards 唱工委音乐奖	2019	Artist of the Year (Male) 年度男歌手	Freak	Won	
CMIC Music Awards 唱工委音乐奖	2019	Album of the Year 年度专辑	Freak	Nominated	
CMIC Music Awards 唱工委音乐奖	2019	Best Music Video 最佳音乐录影带	"Freak"	Nominated	
Global Chinese Golden Chart Awards 全球流行音乐金榜颁奖典礼	2019	Most Popular Album of the Year 年度最受欢迎专辑	Freak	Won	
Global Chinese Golden Chart Awards 全球流行音乐金榜颁奖典礼	2019	Top 20 Hits of the Year 年度二十大金曲	"The Mute"	Won	
Global Chinese Music Awards 全球华语歌曲排行榜颁奖典礼	2019	Top 20 Hits of the Year 年度二十大金曲	"Talent"	Won	
Global Chinese Pop Chart 华人歌曲音乐盛典	2019	Album of the Year (Mainland) 年度最佳专辑(内地)	Freak	Won	
Global Chinese Pop Chart 华人歌曲音乐盛典	2019	Top Hit of the Year 年度金曲	"Freak"	Won	
Global Chinese Pop Chart 华人歌曲音乐盛典	2019	Lyricist of the Year 年度最佳作词	"Talent"	Nominated	
Migu Music Awards 音乐盛典咪咕汇	2019	Album of the Year 年度最佳专辑	Freak	Won	
Q China Annual Music Ceremony; Q China 年度音乐盛典	2019	Best Song of the Year 年度最佳单曲	"Skyscrapers"	Won	
