= Beginner (album) =

Studio album by Joker Xue
- Released: July 18, 2016
- Recorded: 2016
- Genre: Mandopop
- Length: 47:15
- Language: Mandarin
- Labels: Ocean Butterflies; Chaoshi Music
- Producer: Joker Xue

Joker Xue chronology
Half (2013)	Beginner (2016)	The Crossing (2017)

Beginner (Chinese: 初学者) is the seventh album by Chinese singer-songwriter Joker Xue. It was released on July 18, 2016, by Ocean Butterflies and later acquired by Xue's own label Chaoshi Music.

== Background and release ==
Xue spent more than two years working on the album, candidly stating that "When I wrote this album, I was not famous yet." Xue also shared that "Every song and every line of lyrics were carefully made. It was very hard. This album brought me back into everyone's attention, and I think the effort was worth it."

The album was released in CD and LP formats and included the six songs from the Gentleman and Half.

== Composition ==
Of the ten tracks on the album, Xue composed music for seven and wrote lyrics for eight tracks. The title track, written and composed by Xue, incorporates strong rock and high drama elements that work well with lyrical imagery to steadily build the song up. Xue also wrote and composed "Just Right" with a catchy chorus and heartrending lyrics: "This is the just right spot to end our journey, before we could reach the ends of the earth together."

Beginner is the focus of Xue's I Think I've Seen You Somewhere Tour, named after the third track on the album, and symbolizes Xue's determination to return to music after detouring to hotpot restaurant, streetwear store, and variety show star in order to fund his music.

== Reception ==
The release party for Beginner was held on Xue's birthday, 17 July. The live broadcast received 160,000 reservations and the number of online viewers exceeded 2 million, an unprecedented amount.

"Beginner" charted at the top of Billboard Radio China Top 10 Chart for four consecutive weeks. "Actor" and "Gentleman" both charted on KuGou Music's Top 500 list, with "Actor" ranking first from Weeks 22 to Week 45 in 2015 and "Gentleman" ranking tenth in September 2016; "Actor" also placed first on Global Chinese Music chart dated 23 June 2015. Apple Music named Beginner as the Album of the Year on their 2016 year-end list.

The music video for "Actor" is one of the most-viewed Chinese music videos on YouTube, with more than 200 million views. The song itself is considered Xue's signature song.

A year after its release, Beginner returned to the sales chart and ranked third on YinYueTai's best-selling albums in mainland China chart along with Xue's 2017 album The Crossing which ranked first.

On TME Physical Album Annual Sales Chart, launched in 2021 and five years after the album's release, Beginner ranked 89th in 2022 but then rose and continued to be in the top 50 in 2023 (ranked 43th), 2024 (ranked 49th), and 2025 (ranked 50th) while the vinyl version of the album ranked 96th in 2024 and 87th in 2025.

== Track listing ==
Track listing for Beginner
No.	Title	Lyrics	Music	Length
1.	"Beginner (初学者)"	Joker Xue	Joker Xue	4:40
2.	"Just Right (刚刚好)"	Joker Xue	Joker Xue	4:10
3.	"I Think I've Seen You Somewhere (我好像在哪见过你)"	Joker Xue	Joker Xue	4:39
4.	"Actor (演员)"	Joker Xue	Joker Xue	4:21
5.	"Gentleman (绅士)"	Joker Xue	Joker Xue	4:50
6.	"Half (一半)"	Joker Xue	Li Ronghao	4:46
7.	"Child (小孩)"	Guo Ding	Guo Ding	5:21
8.	"Stay Here"	Joker Xue	Peter Krafft	5:01
9.	"The Flower and the Youth (花儿和少年)"	Wen Ya	Joker Xue/Gaoyang	4:22
10.	"It's Raining (下雨了)"	Joker Xue	Joker Xue	5:05
Total length:				47:15

== Accolades ==
Awards and nominations
Award	Year	Category	Nominee	Result	Ref.
Chinese Top Ten Music Awards 东方风云榜颁奖典礼	2016	Top 10 Hits of the Year 十大金曲	"Half"	Won	
City Super Chart 城市至尊音乐榜	2016	Top 20 Hits of the Year 年度二十大金曲	"Gentleman"	Won	
Global Chinese Music Awards 全球华语歌曲排行榜颁奖典礼	2016	Top 20 Hits of the Year 年度二十大金曲	"Beginner"	Won	
KuGou Music Awards 酷狗音乐大赏	2016	Hottest Song of the Year 年度最火单曲	"Actor"	Won	
Migu Music Awards 音乐盛典咪咕汇	2016	Top 10 Hits of the Year 年度十大金曲	"Actor"	Won	
Music Pioneer Awards; 9+2音乐先锋榜	2016	Best Original Song of the Year 年度最佳原创歌曲	"Beginner"	Won	
Music Radio China Top Chart Awards; Music Radio中国Top排行榜颁奖典礼	2016	Top Hit of the Year 年度金曲	"Actor"	Won	
Music Radio China Top Chart Awards; Music Radio中国Top排行榜颁奖典礼	2016	Most Popular Album of the Year 年度最受欢迎唱片	Beginner	Nominated	
Chinese Music Awards 华语金曲奖	2017	Best Mandarin Male Singer of the Year 年度最佳国语男歌手	Beginner	Nominated	
CMIC Music Awards 唱工委音乐奖	2017	Best Pop Vocal Performance 最佳流行演唱	"Beginner"	Won	
CMIC Music Awards 唱工委音乐奖	2017	Album of the Year 年度专辑	Beginner	Nominated	
CMIC Music Awards 唱工委音乐奖	2017	Song of the Year 年度歌曲	"Actor"	Nominated	
CMIC Music Awards 唱工委音乐奖	2017	Best Pop Album 最佳流行专辑	Beginner	Nominated	
Freshasia Music Awards 亚洲新歌榜年度盛典	2017	Album of the Year 年度最佳专辑	Beginner	Won	
Global Chinese Music Awards 全球华语歌曲排行榜颁奖典礼	2017	Top 20 Hits of the Year 年度二十大金曲	"Beginner"	Won	
Global Chinese Music Awards 全球华语歌曲排行榜颁奖典礼	2017	Most Popular Album of the Year 年度最受欢迎专辑	Beginner	Won	
MTV Global Chinese Music Festival; MTV全球华语音乐盛典	2017	Top 10 Hits of the Year 年度十大金曲	"Actor"	Won	
MTV Global Chinese Music Festival; MTV全球华语音乐盛典	2017	Top 10 Hits of the Year 年度十大金曲	"Half"	Nominated	
Music Radio China Top Chart Awards; Music Radio中国Top排行榜颁奖典礼	2017	Most Popular Album of the Year 年度最受欢迎专辑	Beginner	Won	
Music Radio China Top Chart Awards; Music Radio中国Top排行榜颁奖典礼	2017	Top 20 Hits of the Year 年度二十大金曲	"Beginner"	Won	
V Chart Awards 音悦V榜年度盛典	2017	Album of the Year 年度最佳专辑	Beginner	Won	
