= Unfinished Songs =

Compilation album by Joker Xue
- Released: December 11, 2009
- Recorded: 2009
- Genre: Mandopop
- Length: 1:01:46
- Language: Mandarin
- Label: Shang Teng; Chaoshi Music
- Producer: Joker Xue

Joker Xue chronology
Deeply Loved You (2008)	Unfinished Songs (2009)	Several Of... (2012)

Unfinished Songs (Chinese: 未完成的歌) is the fourth album by Chinese singer-songwriter Joker Xue. It was released on December 11, 2009, by Shang Teng and later acquired by Xue's own label Chaoshi Music.

== Background ==
Unfinished Songs is a compilation album with 11 previously released songs and three new songs. The three new songs are: "Unfinished Songs" (未完成的歌), "My Athena" (我的雅典娜), and "Thank You to Those Who Love Me" (爱我的人 谢谢你).

Of the 14 tracks on the album, Xue composed music for 13 and wrote lyrics for nine. The single, Unfinished Songs took more than a year to complete because Xue was waiting for the right lyrics to fit the melody. Gan Shijia, who has previously collaborated with Xue, ended up writing the lyrics for Unfinished Songs.

== Track listing ==
Track listing for Unfinished Songs
No.	Title	Lyrics	Music	Length
1.	"Unfinished Songs (未完成的歌)"	Gan Shijia	Joker Xue	4:20
2.	"My Athena (我的雅典娜)"	Joker Xue	Joker Xue	3:43
3.	"Legend (传说)"	Joker Xue	Joker Xue	4:33
4.	"Circus Clown (马戏小丑)"	Luo Kaiyuan	Joker Xue	5:03
5.	"How Are You (你过得好吗)"	Joker Xue	Joker Xue	4:25
6.	"Women in the World of Mortals (红尘女子)"	Joker Xue	Joker Xue	4:40
7.	"Memory"	Joker Xue	Joker Xue	5:04
8.	"Allure (倾城)"	Gan Shijia	Joker Xue	3:54
9.	"Our World (我们的世界)"	Joker Xue	Joker Xue	4:18
10.	"To My Lover (给我的爱人)"	Joker Xue	Joker Xue	4:48
11.	"Love's Expiration Date (爱的期限)"	Gan Shijia	Joker Xue	4:28
12.	"Yellow Maple Leaves (黄色枫叶)"	Joker Xue	Joker Xue	4:14
13.	"Serious Snow (认真的雪)"	Joker Xue	Joker Xue	4:21
14.	"Thank You to Those Who Love Me (爱我的人 谢谢你)"	Jiang Xiaohua	Gaoyang	3:55
Total length:				1:01:46

== Accolades ==
Accolades for Unfinished Songs
Award	Year	Category	Work	Results
CCTV Music Global Popular Song Festival; CCTV风云音乐环球红歌盛典	2010	Most Popular Streaming Song 年度网络最受欢迎金曲奖	"Unfinished Songs"	Won
