= The Guardian (album) =

Studio album by Joker Xue
- Released: November 22, 2024
- Recorded: 2024
- Genre: Mandopop
- Length: 44:27
- Language: Mandarin
- Label: Chaoshi Music

Joker Xue chronology
Countless (2022)	The Guardian (2024)

The Guardian (Chinese: 守村人) is the thirteenth album by Chinese singer-songwriter Joker Xue. It was released digitally on November 22, 2024, by Xue's own label Chaoshi Music. The preorder for the physical album began April 17, 2025.

== Background ==
Of the ten tracks on the album, Xue composed music for six tracks and wrote lyrics for six tracks. The album title is a reference to the folklore of the village guardian, with the title track including lyrics such as "Real name must be hidden" (真名必须要隐藏) and "I will endure until the next me arrives" (我会撑到下一个我赶来). In the folklore, a village guardian is someone who has committed wrongs in their previous life and makes amends through defending the village, enduring mockery, and learning from the kindness shown by others in this life. The concept is similar to the village idiot but without the stereotypical comic relief aspects. In his Weibo announcing the release of the physical album, Xue stated that being the guardian means to "not bully the weak nor flatter the strong" (不欺弱 不媚强) and called for his fans to be guardians to themselves and others.

"Youth of Galaxy" is a collaboration with Essay Wang, who was a regular guest of and performed the song with Xue on Xue's Extraterrestrial World Tour. "Relieve Boredom" is the theme song of and created specifically for QQ Speed after Xue was named the brand ambassador; it was released via an in-game virtual concert then on streaming platforms the following day.

"Rent or Purchase" and "That Day On the Road of No Return" were submitted by songwriters Dong Jiahong and Mooney, respectively, and selected by Xue on the music variety show Melody Journey. Both songs had a live stage on the show and the live versions were released prior to the studio version. The live version of "Rent or Purchase", in particular, was extremely well-received and has the highest QQ Music heatscore of all songs performed on the show.

The first track, "The Guardian", and the final track, "Conviction", were released on July 17, Xue's birthday, in 2024 and 2023, respectively.

== Reception ==
On Tencent Music's 2023 year-end chart, "Adoration" and "Conviction" were among the Top 10 Songs of the Year, "Conviction" and "Youth of Galaxy" was among songs preferred by listeners aged 19–22, and "Adoration" was among Top Radio Songs of the Year.

On Tencent Music's 2024 year-end chart, Xue was named among the Top 10 Artist of the Year and Singer-Songwriter of the Year; The Guardian was named among the Top 10 Albums of the Year (overall) and ranked 6th on UNI Chart's Albums of the Year list; "AI" was named among Top 10 Songs of the Year, "The Guardian" was among the Top 5 Songs Preferred by Listeners between the ages 19–22, and "Relieve Boredom" ranked 6th on Video Game Song of the Year and ranked 10th in culminative views for the year despite being released in August.

All songs on the album peaked within the top fifteen spots on Tencent Music UNI chart, with the exception of "Rent or Purchase" at 19. In December 2024, China Music Group released the 2024 Music Industry Report; in it, "Rent or Purchase" was named Global Nostalgic Single of the Year.

"Relieve Boredom", notably, debuted at the top of the QQ Music rap chart, marking Xue's first appearance on that chart

== Commercial performance ==
After "The Guardian" was released online at midnight on 17 July, Tianyancha Intellectual Property Information shows many parties have successfully applied to register "The Guardian" as a trademark, including technology, wine, and catering companies with international classifications including convenience foods, wine, clothing, and more.

On 17 April, presale for the physical album began across multiple platforms. Within 7 hours, the album sold more than 128,000 copies and exceeded ¥15 million (approximately $2 million) on QQ Music alone, earning the Palace Diamond certification. On TME Physical Album Annual Sales Chart, The Guardian ranked first on the weekly and monthly charts, and second on the annual chart. Due to the high order volume and some components of the album were made by hand, production and shipping of the album were done in batches. Batches were determined based on the time, split down to the second, when customer placed the order.

== Track listing ==
Track listing for The Guardian
No.	Title	Lyrics	Music	Length
1.	"The Guardian (守村人)"	Joker Xue	Song Tao	4:57
2.	"Youth of Galaxy (银河少年)" (feat. Essay Wang)	Joker Xue/Ding Yu	Essay Wang/Joker Xue/Ding Yu	4:21
3.	"AI"	Joker Xue	Joker Xue/Zhou Yili	4:40
4.	"Nothing"	Jace Guo	Joker Xue	4:00
5.	"Adoration (崇拜)"	Joker Xue/Zi Wang	Joker Xue/Jace Guo	4:56
6.	"Love Letter (情书)"	Zhang Ronghao	Zhang Ronghao	4:56
7.	"Rent or Purchase (租购)"	Zhang Pengpeng/Dong Jiahong	Dong Jiahong	4:31
8.	"Relieve Boredom (解解闷)"	Joker Xue	Joker Xue	3:34
9.	"That Day On the Road of No Return (在那天回不去的路上)"	Mooney	Mooney	3:24
10.	"Conviction (念)"	Joker Xue	Joker Xue/Zhao Yingjun	5:08
Total length:				44:27

== Accolades ==
Accolades for The Guardian
Award	Year	Category	Nominee	Result	Ref.
2023	Asian Pop Music Awards 亚洲流行音乐大奖	Top 20 Songs of the Year 年度TOP20金曲	"Adoration"	Won	
2023	NetEase Cloud Music Awards 网易云年度音乐奖	Top 10 Hits of the Year 年度十大热门歌曲	"Adoration"	Won	
2024	Asian Pop Music Awards 亚洲流行音乐大奖	People's Choice Award (Chinese) 大众选择奖(华语)	"AI"	9th place	
2024	Tencent Music Entertainment Awards 腾讯音乐娱乐盛典	Top 10 Hits of the Year 年度十大金曲	"Adoration"	Won	
2024	Weibo Music Awards 微博音乐盛典	Most Recommended Song 年度推荐歌曲	"AI"	Won	
2025	Migu Music Awards 音乐盛典咪咕汇	Album of the Year 年度最佳专辑	The Guardian	Won	
2025	Migu Music Awards 音乐盛典咪咕汇	Top 10 Hits of the Year 年度十大金曲	"That Day On the Road of No Return"	Won	
2025	Wave Music Awards 浪潮音乐大赏	Best Pop Album of the Year 最佳流行专辑	The Guardian	Won	
2025	Wave Music Awards 浪潮音乐大赏	Male Artist of the Year 最佳男歌手	The Guardian	Nominated	
2025	Wave Music Awards 浪潮音乐大赏	Lyricist of the Year 最佳作词	"The Guardian"	Nominated	
2025	Wave Music Awards 浪潮音乐大赏	Producer of the Year 年度制作	The Guardian	Nominated	
