= Dust (Joker Xue album) =

Studio album by Joker Xue
- Released: December 27, 2019
- Recorded: 2019
- Genre: Mandopop
- Length: 45:25
- Language: Mandarin
- Label: Huayu World Expo; Chaoshi Music
- Producer: Joker Xue

Joker Xue chronology
Freak (2018)	Dust (2019)	Extraterrestrial (2020)

Dust (Chinese: 尘) is the tenth album by Chinese singer-songwriter Joker Xue. It was released digitally on December 27, 2019, by Huayu World Expo and later acquired by Xue's own label Chaoshi Music. The physical album went on presale on May 5, 2020.

== Background ==
Xue described the concept for the album as a journey of illusions seen through the eyes of a puppet and upon reaching its destination, the illusions scatter to dust. The album cover, featuring images of horse and deer in black and red, is a reference to the Chinese idiom "calling a horse a deer (指鹿为马)" which is used to describe people who deliberately confuse one thing for another and do not distinguish between right and wrong. This is later explored further in songs like "Puppet", "Half a Beat Slower", "Morbid State", "Loop" and more specifically in "Cooperate" through the contradictory lens of criticism and hope, shuttling between reality and ideals.

Of the ten tracks on the album, Xue composed music for six tracks and wrote lyrics for nine tracks. "Express Your Feelings" was created on the variety show Infinite Song Season when Xue was partnered up with Yi Yi in 2018. Xue developed the song further and invited Liu Xijun on the track.

The seventh track, "Accompany You to Wander", is the song Xue worked on for the longest, starting from when he adapted "Thousands of Words" by Teresa Teng as a prelude to "Accompany You to Wander" on the show Mother Like Flowers. Over the years, he attempted to find a better prelude but could not. Finally, he acquired the rights "Thousands of Words" and completed "Accompany You to Wander". When he shared the song on Weibo, he revealed that, to him, the seventh song on an album has a special function by serving as a gauge of the album's quality.

== Reception ==
Dust is #1 on Tencent Music's 2019 Year-End Chart which ranks the albums based on the sum of the five highest scored songs on each album while "Puppet" and "Half a Beat Slower" were among the Top 20 Songs of the Year and "Puppet", "Mocking", "It's Been So Long", and "Half a Beat Slower" were among the Top 20 Popular Singles of the Year.

Billboard magazine included "Puppet" (木偶人) on their The Global No. 1s You (Probably) Never Heard list, describing the song as a "soaring ballad about a failing relationship." "Puppet" and "Half a Beat Slower" peaked at #1 on Tencent Music UNI Chart. All songs on the album peaked within the top ten spots, with the exception of "Loop" which peaked at 19.

On TME Physical Album Annual Sales Chart, launched in 2021 and two years after the album's release, Dust ranked 78th in 2022 but then rose and continued to be in the top 40 in 2023 (ranked 33th), 2024 (ranked 32nd), and 2025 (ranked 34th).

== Track listing ==
Track listing for Dust
No.	Title	Lyrics	Music	Length
1.	"Puppet (木偶人)"	Joker Xue	Joker Xue	4:49
2.	"Half a Beat Slower (慢半拍)"	Joker Xue	Xu Song	4:04
3.	"It's Been So Long (这么久没见)"	Joker Xue	Joker Xue	4:57
4.	"Mocking (笑场)"	Pei Zhisen/Joker Xue	Zhang Zhenhao	4:34
5.	"Morbid State (病态)"	Joker Xue	Song Tao	4:42
6.	"Dust (尘)"	Joker Xue	Joker Xue	4:44
7.	"Accompany You to Wander (陪你去流浪)"	Joker Xue	Joker Xue	4:36
8.	"Cooperate (配合)"	Joker Xue/Gan Shijia	Zhou Yili/Joker Xue	3:35
9.	"Loop (环)"	Meng Nan	Meng Nan	4:07
10.	"Express Your Feelings (聊表心意)" (feat. Liu Xijun)	Joker Xue	Joker Xue	5:17
Total length:				45:25

== Accolades ==
Accolades for Dust
Award	Year	Category	Work	Result	Ref.
Migu Music Awards 音乐盛典咪咕汇	2019	Top 10 Hits of the Year 年度十大金曲	"Puppet"	Won	
Canadian Chinese Pop Music Awards 加拿大至 HIT 中文歌曲排行榜	2020	Top 10 Mandarin Singles of the Year 至 HIT推崇 國語 十大歌曲	"Mocking"	Won	
Chinese Music Awards 华语金曲奖	2020	Best Mandarin Song of the Year 年度最佳国语歌曲	"Puppet"	Won	
Chinese Music Awards 华语金曲奖	2020	Top Ten Mandarin Songs 国语十大金曲	"Puppet"	Won	
Chinese Music Awards 华语金曲奖	2020	Best Singer-Songwriter of the Year 年度最佳唱作人	Dust	Nominated	
Chinese Music Awards 华语金曲奖	2020	Best Mandarin Male Singer of the Year 年度最佳国语男歌手	Dust	Nominated	
Chinese Music Awards 华语金曲奖	2020	Lyricist of the Year 年度最佳作词人	"Puppet"	Nominated	
Chinese Music Awards 华语金曲奖	2020	Composer of the Year 年度最佳作曲人	"Puppet"	Nominated	
CMIC Music Awards 唱工委音乐奖	2020	Best Pop Album 最佳流行专辑	Dust	Nominated	
CMIC Music Awards 唱工委音乐奖	2020	Best Composition 最佳作曲	"Puppet"	Nominated	
Global Chinese Golden Chart Awards 全球流行音乐金榜颁奖典礼	2020	Most Popular Album 年度最受欢迎专辑	Dust	Won	
Global Chinese Golden Chart Awards 全球流行音乐金榜颁奖典礼	2020	Top 20 Hits of the Year 年度二十大金曲	"Half a Beat Slower"	Won	
