= How Are You? (Joker Xue album) =

Studio album by Joker Xue
- Released: July 31, 2007
- Recorded: 2007
- Genre: Mandopop
- Length: 46:07
- Language: Mandarin
- Label: Shang Teng; Chaoshi Music
- Producer: Chen Yaochuan; Peng Cheng; Liu Dajiang; Zheng Wei

Joker Xue chronology
Jacky (2006)	How Are You? (2007)	Deeply Loved You (2008)

How Are You? (Chinese: 你过得好吗) is the second album by Chinese singer-songwriter Joker Xue. It was released on July 31, 2007, by Shang Teng and later acquired by Xue's own label Chaoshi Music.

== Background ==
Of the ten tracks on the album, Xue composed the music for eight and wrote lyrics for three. The song "Continued Snow" was a continuation of "Serious Snow" from his debut album Jacky, both songs shared the line "The snow is falling so deep (雪下得那么深)".

The lead single, "How Are You?", portrayed the emotional journey of moving on from a past lover and wishing them well after the breakup. It premiered on CityFM and Music Radio.

Due to a busy work schedule and pressure to match or exceed his debut album, Xue suffered from insomnia while working on this album and had to rely on sleeping pills to get rest.

== Reception ==
Within one month of release, the album sold more than 150,000 copies.

The album featured mostly ballads with elements of Chinese style and hip hop. "Love Verdict" was intended to be a R&B song but deviated from the genre during the writing process. "Allure" and "Friends How Are You" carried strong rhythm and were more upbeat compared to the ballads Xue became known for. "Circus Clown" left a deep impression for its storytelling of the struggles of a circus clown and his almost "desperate state of mind." Xue received praised for his vocals, "his affectionate and sincere voice" was memorable though the ballads were criticized for "sounding almost the same."

== Track listing ==
Track listing for How Are You?
No.	Title	Lyrics	Music	Length
1.	"Once Upon a Time in Zurich (苏黎世的从前)"	Joker Xue	Joker Xue	4:55
2.	"How Are You (你过得好吗)"	Joker Xue	Joker Xue	4:46
3.	"Love Verdict (爱情宣判)"	Joker Xue	Joker Xue	4:36
4.	"Friends How Are You (朋友你们还好吗)"	Tomo	Joker Xue	4:42
5.	"Love's Expiration Date (爱的期限)"	Gan Shijia	Joker Xue	4:21
6.	"Circus Clown (马戏小丑)"	Luo Kaiyuan	Joker Xue	4:58
7.	"Allure (倾城)"	Gan Shijia	Joker Xue	3:51
8.	"Throw the Handkerchief (丢手绢)"	Liang Sicheng	Liang Sicheng	4:25
9.	"Continued Snow (续雪)"	Gan Shijia	Joker Xue	4:40
10.	"How Are You? (你过得好吗)" (Instrumental)	Joker Xue	Joker Xue	4:47
Total length:				46:07

== Accolades ==
Awards and nominations
Award	Year	Category	Work	Result	Ref.
Beijing Pop Music Awards 北京流行音乐典礼	2008	Top 20 Hits of the Year 二十大金曲	"How Are You"	Won	
China's Original Music Popular Chart 中国原创音乐流行榜总选颁奖典礼	2008	Most Promising Singer 最具潜质歌手奖	"How Are You"	Won	
Music Radio China Top Chart Awards; Music Radio中国Top排行榜颁奖典礼	2008	Top Hit of the Year (Mainland) 内地年度金曲	"How Are You"	Won	
