= Jacky (album) =

Studio album by Joker Xue
- Released: June 9, 2006
- Recorded: 2006
- Genre: Mandopop
- Length: 43:39
- Language: Mandarin
- Label: Shang Teng; Chaoshi Music
- Producer: Chen Yaochuan; Peng Cheng; Shi Zi

Joker Xue chronology
Jacky (2006)	How Are You? (2007)

Jacky (Chinese: 薛之谦) is the debut album by Chinese singer-songwriter Joker Xue. It was released on June 9, 2006, by Shang Teng and later acquired by Xue's own label Chaoshi Music.

== Background ==
Production of the album took six months. Of the ten tracks on the album, Xue composed music for six and wrote lyrics for five, a rare feat for a first album. Musically, the album presents a fusion of Eastern Classic of Poetry and Western R&B elements.

The album received strong support from Shanghai Media Group, who live streamed the press conference.

"Yellow Maple Leaves" and "Return of the Prince" were created by Xue while participating in the singing competition show My Style, My Show. The latter received praise for having a majestic prelude with rich visuals, telling the love story between a prince and a princess during a war.

The album's English title is "Jacky" because that was Xue's English name at the time. He later changed his English name to "Joker" in 2016.

== Reception ==
"Serious Snow" performed well on charts and was one of the highest downloaded ringtones of the year. It became one of Xue's most well-known works.

Jacky sold more than 200,000 copies within 1.5 month; the success prompted Shang Teng Entertainment to release 10,000 sets of limited edition photobook, CD, and DVD.

Due to high demand, second and third edition were released in late 2006, an unprecedented accomplishment for a new artist. The third edition included the commercial song for Wrigly chewing gum, "Everybody Wants It" featuring Liu Junlin.

Jacky was the best-selling album by a male mainland China artist of 2006. The total sales volume is more than 500,000.

== Track listing ==
Track listing for Jacky
No.	Title	Lyrics	Music	Length
1.	"The Return of the Prince (王子归来)"	Joker Xue	Joker Xue	4:48
2.	"Serious Snow (认真的雪)"	Joker Xue	Joker Xue	4:19
3.	"Women in the World of Mortals (红尘女子)"	Joker Xue	Joker Xue	4:43
4.	"Love Doesn't Leave (爱不走)"	Gou Wei	Gou Wei	4:25
5.	"The Happy Gang (快乐帮)"	Zhang Peng	Zheng Wei	4:01
6.	"My Show (我的Show)"	Yi Jiayang/Cheng Quan	Liu Wei	3:35
7.	"Yellow Maple Leaves (黄色枫叶)"	Joker Xue	Joker Xue	4:12
8.	"Phoenix Hairpin (钗头凤)"	Gan Shijia	Joker Xue	5:00
9.	"Memory"	Joker Xue	Joker Xue	5:01
10.	"My Show (我的Show)" (Instrumental)	Yi Jiayang/Cheng Jin	Liu Wei	3:35
Total length:				43:39

== Accolades ==
Awards and nominations
Award	Year	Category	Work	Result	Ref.
Beijing Pop Music Awards 北京流行音乐典礼	2007	Top Hit of the Year 年度金曲	"Yellow Maple Leaves"	Won	
China's Original Music Popular Chart 中国原创音乐流行榜季选颁奖典礼	2006	Most Popular New Artist (Male) 内地最佳新人奖	"Serious Snow"	Won	
China's Original Music Popular Chart 中国原创音乐流行榜季选颁奖典礼	2007	Top Hit (Mainland) 内地金曲	"Serious Snow"	Won	
Global Chinese Music Awards 全球华语歌曲排行榜颁奖典礼	2006	Top 20 Hits of the Year 二十大最受欢迎金曲	"Yellow Maple Leaves"	Nominated	
Chinese Top Ten Music Awards 东方风云榜颁奖典礼	2007	Top 10 Hits of the Year 十大金曲	"Serious Snow"	Won	
Chinese Top Ten Music Awards 东方风云榜颁奖典礼	2013	Twenty Years of Top Hits 二十年至尊金曲	"Serious Snow"	Won	
Chinese Top Ten Music Awards 东方风云榜颁奖典礼	2023	Top Songs from the Past 30 Years 三十年至尊金曲	"Serious Snow"	Won	
Migu Music Awards 音乐盛典咪咕汇	2008	Most Promising Creative Idol 最具潜力创作偶像	"Serious Snow"	Won	
Music Radio China Top Chart Awards; Music Radio中国Top排行榜颁奖典礼	2007	Most Popular Artist on College Campuses (Mainland) 内地校园人气大奖	Jacky	Won	
