= Several Of... =

Studio album by Joker Xue
- Released: August 15, 2012
- Recorded: 2012
- Genre: Mandopop
- Length: 40:47
- Language: Mandarin
- Label: Shang Teng; Chaoshi Music
- Producer: Joker Xue

Joker Xue chronology
Unfinished Songs (2009)	Several Of... (2012)	An Unexpected Journey (2013)

Several Of... (Chinese: 几个薛之谦) is the fifth album by Chinese singer-songwriter Joker Xue. It was released on August 15, 2012, by Shang Teng and later acquired by Xue's own label Chaoshi Music.

== Background ==
There are nine tracks on the album with Xue composing music for six tracks and writing lyrics for six tracks. The single, "I Know That You Know", was on The Queen of SOP soundtrack and quickly gained popularity. "As Long As We Have Loved", performed with Huang Ling, served as the theme song for the movie Music World. The song "Chu River and Han Border" was created specifically for the 2009 Xiangqi finals in Luwan, Shanghai.

== Track listing ==
Track listing for Several Of...
No.	Title	Lyrics	Music	Length
1.	"I Know That You Know (我知道你都知道)"	Gan Shijia	Joker Xue	4:34
2.	"Several of You (几个你)"	Joker Xue	Joker Xue	5:17
3.	"Foreshadowing (伏笔)"	Guo Ding	Guo Ding	4:46
4.	"Why (为什么)"	Joker Xue	Joker Xue/Luo Kaiyuan	4:17
5.	"I Finally Became Someone Else's Woman (我终于成了别人的女人)"	Joker Xue	Gaoyang	5:06
6.	"Perfunctory (敷衍)"	Joker Xue	Joker Xue/Gaoyang	4:09
7.	"As Long as We Have Loved (我们爱过就好)" (feat. Huang Ling)	Joker Xue	Joker Xue/Gaoyang	4:20
8.	"Chu River and Han Border (楚河汉界)"	Joker Xue/Li Wenyu	Joker Xue	4:18
9.	"In Order to Meet You (为了遇见你)"	Liao Yingru	Chen Yaochuan	4:00
Total length:				40:47

== Accolades ==
Awards and nominations
Award	Year	Category	Work	Result	Ref.
Global Chinese Music Awards 全球华语歌曲排行榜颁奖典礼	2011	Top 20 Hits of the Year 年度二十大金曲	"I Finally Became Someone Else's Woman"	Won	
Beijing Pop Music Awards 北京流行音乐典礼	2012	Top Hits of the Year 十大金曲	"I Know That You Know"	Won	
Chinese Top Ten Music Awards 东方风云榜颁奖典礼	2012	Top 10 Hits of the Year 十大金曲	"I Finally Became Someone Else's Woman"	Won	
Chinese Top Ten Music Awards 东方风云榜颁奖典礼	2012	Song of the Year (Duet) 年度对唱歌曲	"As Long As We Have Loved"	Won	
Music Radio China Top Chart Awards; Music Radio中国Top排行榜颁奖典礼	2013	Most Recommended Album (Mainland) 内地推荐唱片	Several Of...	Won	
