= An Unexpected Journey (album) =

Studio album by Joker Xue
- Released: November 11, 2013
- Recorded: 2013
- Genre: Mandopop
- Length: 43:57
- Language: Mandarin
- Label: Ocean Butterflies; Chaoshi Music
- Producer: Joker Xue

Joker Xue chronology
Several Of... (2012)	An Unexpected Journey (2013)	Gentleman (2016)

An Unexpected Journey (Chinese: 意外) is the sixth album by Chinese singer-songwriter Joker Xue. It was released on November 11, 2013, by Ocean Butterflies and later acquired by Xue's own label Chaoshi Music.

== Background ==
There are ten tracks on the album with Xue composing music for six tracks and writing lyrics for six tracks. He also served as the album producer. The album incorporated new elements of Britpop and pop-rock, such as "Ugly" and "An Unexpected Journey", in addition to the emotional ballads Xue became known for, such as "What Do You Want From Me" and the lead single "Radius Around You".

== Reception ==
Upon release, An Unexpected Journey ranked #1 on Sino Chart and remained at the top for two weeks.

"Radius Around You" topped several music charts upon release and the music video topped YinYueTai's VChart upon release as well. "What Do You Want From Me" ranked first on YinYueTai's VChart in December 2013 and ranked third on Kugou Music's Top 500 list in September 2016 while "Ugly" ranked fourth on Kugou Music's Top 500 list in January 2017.

On TME Physical Album Sales Chart, launched in 2021, An Unexpected Journey continued to appear on the annual chart, ranking 28th in 2024 and 37th in 2025.

== Track listing ==
Track listing for An Unexpected Journey
No.	Title	Lyrics	Music	Length
1.	"Ugly (丑八怪)"	Gan Shijia	Li Ronghao	4:13
2.	"An Unexpected Journey (意外)"	Yang Zipu	Yang Zipu	4:49
3.	"What Do You Want from Me (你还要我怎样)"	Joker Xue	Joker Xue	5:10
4.	"Is There (有没有)"	Guo Ding	Guo Ding	4:12
5.	"Fashion Seasons (潮流季)"	Lin Xiaoke	Guo Ding	4:00
6.	"Wait for Me to Come Home (等我回家)"	Joker Xue	Joker Xue	4:57
7.	"I Thought of You (我想起你了)"	Joker Xue	Gaoyang	3:50
8.	"Actually (其实)"	Joker Xue	Joker Xue	4:02
9.	"Radius Around You (方圆几里)"	Joker Xue	Joker Xue	4:23
10.	"Radius Around You (方圆几里)" (Guitar version)	Joker Xue	Joker Xue	4:21
Total length:				43:57

== Accolades ==
Award	Year	Category	Nominee	Result	Ref.
Chinese Top Ten Music Awards 东方风云榜颁奖典礼	2014	Top 10 Hits of the Year 十大金曲	"An Unexpected Journey"	Won	
Music Radio China Top Chart Awards; Music Radio中国Top排行榜颁奖典礼	2014	Song of the Year 年度最佳金曲	"Ugly"	Won	
