= Actor (Joker Xue song) =

Single by Joker Xue

from the album: Gentleman; Beginner
- Language: Mandarin
- Released: June 5, 2015
- Recorded: 2015
- Genre: Pop; R&B
- Length: 4:21
- Label: Ocean Butterflies; Chaoshi
- Songwriter: Joker Xue
- Producer: Zhao Yingjun

Joker Xue singles chronology
"How Are You" (2007)	"Actor" (2015)	"Beginner" (2016)

Music video
- "Actor" on YouTube

"Actor" (Chinese: 演员; pinyin: Yǎnyuán) is a song by Chinese singer-songwriter Joker Xue. It was released on June 5, 2015, as part of his first extended play (EP) Gentleman (2015) then later included on his seventh studio album Beginner (2016) under Ocean Butterflies; both of which have been acquired by Xue's own label Chaoshi Music. The song was written and composed by Xue.

"Actor" is Xue's best-known song both domestically and internationally, with more than 200 million views on YouTube, more than 100 million streams on Spotify and more than 27 million collection counts on QQ Music. It is a staple in the setlist for Xue's three concert tours: I Think I've Seen You Somewhere Tour (2017), Skyscraper World Tour (2018-2019), and Extraterrestrial World Tour (2021-2025).

In 2015, "Actor" ranked first on KuGou Music's Top 500 list from Week 22 to Week 45 and on Global Chinese Music chart in June. In 2018, "Actor" ranked 9th on UFM100.3's U1000 Music Countdown of the top 1,000 Mandarin songs.

== Background ==
The Gentleman, on which "Actor" is the second track, took 19 months to complete. Xue said the inspiration for the song was the wish that "in front of love, I am not an 'actor' but I hope to be a 'gentleman.'"

== Music video ==
The music video for "Actor" was directed by Shockley Huang and starred Xue and Bae Seul-ki as the male and female leads. It tells the story of a couple who were once in love but now she is only pretending her feelings for him, like an actor on stage. Aware of this, he pretends to be cruel so she can leave without regret. As he watches her leave, a tear dripped down his cheek that becomes a raindrop.

To capture the atmosphere of the song, the music video incorporated elements that portray the male protagonist's inner emotions, such as "raining indoor" and the "rewinding" the relationship.

== Accolades ==
Awards and nominations for "Actor"
Award	Year	Category	Nominee	Result	Ref.
KuGou Music Awards 酷狗音乐大赏	2016	Hottest Song of the Year 年度最火单曲	"Actor"	Won	
Migu Music Awards 音乐盛典咪咕汇	2016	Top 10 Hits of the Year 年度十大金曲	"Actor"	Won	
Music Radio China Top Chart Awards; Music Radio中国Top排行榜颁奖典礼	2016	Top Hit of the Year 年度金曲	"Actor"	Won	
CMIC Music Awards 唱工委音乐奖	2017	Song of the Year 年度歌曲	"Actor"	Nominated	
MTV Global Chinese Music Festival; MTV全球华语音乐盛典	2017	Top 10 Hits of the Year 年度十大金曲	"Actor"	Won	

== Cover versions ==
In 2016, "Actor" was covered by Li Jiage on season 1 of the Chinese version of Mask Singer and Hebe Tien on season 1 of Sound of My Dream. In 2017, a duet version of "Actor" was released by Kenny Khoo and Rose Liu and Sammi Cheng covered "Actor" during her Nude Live concerts in Taipei and Beijing.

== Credits and personnel ==
- Joker Xue – vocals, lyrics, composition
- Zhao Yingjun – production, background vocals
- Zheng Wei, Zhang Baoyu – arrangement
- Shockley Huang – director

== Release history ==
Release dates and formats
Region	Date	Format	Label
Various	June 5, 2015	Digital download; streaming	Ocean Butterflies
