= Joker Xue =

- 薛之谦
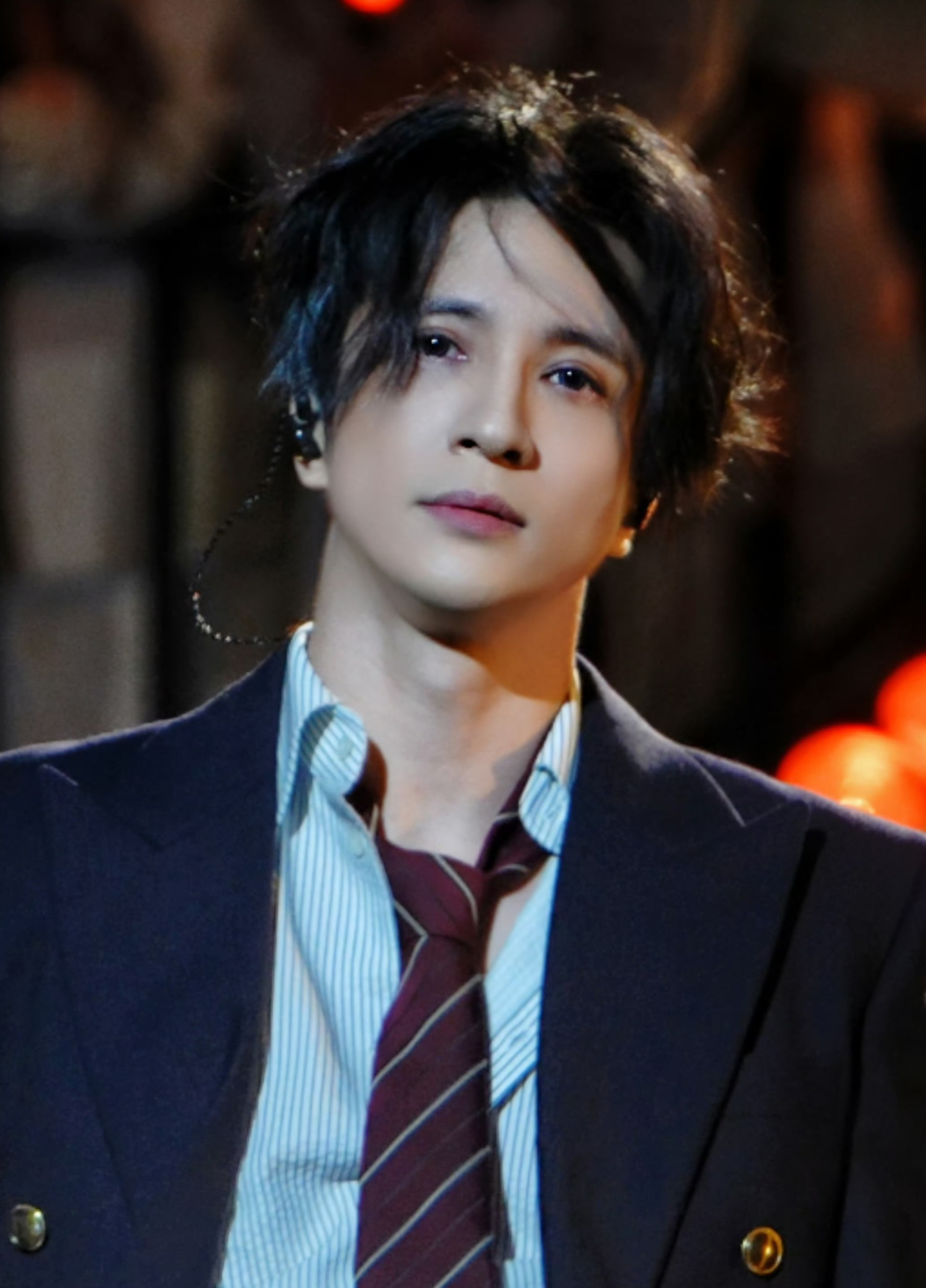
- Xue in June 2025, Bilibili Forever 22 Graduation Concert
- Born: Xue Zhiqian; July 17, 1983 (age 43); Shanghai, China
- Education: Glion Institute of Higher Education
- Occupations: Singer-songwriter; record producer; businessman
- Years active: 2005–present
- Spouses: Leixin Gao (m. 2012–2015) (m. 2017)
- Children: 1
- Awards: Full list
- Musical career
- Genre: Mandopop
- Instruments: Vocals; guitar; piano
- Label: Chaoshi Music

Chinese name
- Traditional Chinese: 薛之謙
- Simplified Chinese: 薛之谦
Transcriptions
Standard Mandarin
- Hanyu Pinyin: Xuē Zhīqiān

Xue Zhiqian (Chinese: 薛之谦; pinyin: Xuē Zhīqiān, born July 17, 1983), also known professionally as Joker Xue, is a Chinese singer, songwriter, producer, and businessman. Known for his distinctive ballads, "Xue Style Love Songs" (薛式情歌/薛氏情歌), and emotive live performances, he is recognized as a leading figure in Chinese popular music and one of the most-known artists in the Chinese-speaking world.

Xue signed with Shang Teng Entertainment in 2005 after appearing on the reality competition My Style, My show (我型我秀). His debut album, Jacky (2006), featured the hit song "Serious Snow" and won him the Best New Artist title at eight Chinese music award ceremonies. Despite achieving success with How Are You? (2007) and Deeply Loved You (2008), his career stagnated due to lack of financial support from Shang Teng Entertainment, forcing him to launch several businesses to fund his next album Several Of... (2012). In 2015, Xue gained significant popularity on Weibo, marking the start of his career resurgence. His album, Beginner (2016), produced the immensely popular song "Actor". He continued to experience critical acclaim and commercial success with the release of The Crossing (2017) and Freak (2018), Dust (2019), and Extraterrestrial (2020).

In 2020, Xue established his own label and production company, Chaoshi Music, releasing Countless (2022) and The Guardian (2024). Chaoshi Music produces Xue's tours as well as tours for other artists and music festivals. In 2023, Xue set a new precedent for concert refund policy when he offered to refund or exchange the tickets and fully reimburse non-local concertgoers' travel and lodging expenses. His action has since spurred other artists to provide similar compensations for concert cancellations.

Though initially known for his distinctive emotional ballads, Xue has shifted his songwriting focus to address societal issues, such as cyberbullying and marine pollution, and incorporated electronica and rap elements into his music. Since his debut, he has embarked on four concert tours, including the Extraterrestrial World Tour (2021-2025), one of the most-attended concert tours of all-time with more 5 million tickets sold. In 2025, NetEase Cloud Music named Xue as the most-streamed artist in the platform's history.

== Early life ==
Xue was born and raised in Shanghai, China. At age four, his mother died of a heart disease. He had fine art training in his youth and later studied hospitality management at the Glion Institute of Higher Education in Switzerland.

== Music career ==
=== 2004–2010: Debut and career beginnings ===
In 2004, Xue passed the audition for the singing competition show My Style, My Show (我型我秀), but chose to resign because he felt he "was not qualified to compete." In 2005, he returned to My Style, My Show, finishing in fourth place and signing with Shang Teng Entertainment (上腾娱乐). In 2006, he released his debut album Jacky (薛之谦) as Jacky Xue. His self-titled album, including major hits such as "Serious Snow" (认真的雪) and "Yellow Maple Leaves" (黄色枫叶), sold over 200,000 copies within one and a half months and Xue was awarded the Most Popular New Artist at the 2006 Global Chinese Music Awards. In 2007, Xue released his second album How Are You? (你过得好吗), which sold more than 150,000 copies within one month of its release.

In 2008, Xue was a torchbearer for the 2008 Summer Olympics torch relay. The song "Once Upon a Time in Zurich" (苏黎世的从前) from his second album was adapted to pay tribute to Olympic athletes and renamed "Origin of the Dream" (梦开始的原点). It was included on his third album Deeply Loved You (深深爱过你) which was considered a critical and commercial success, making history with seven nominations at the Beijing Pop Music Awards and prompting his company to release an upgraded commemorative album in April of the following year. He closed out the year with his first concert in Shanghai on December 20.

In 2009, Xue released Unfinished Songs (未完成的歌), a compilation album composed of selected tracks from his previous albums with three new songs. Despite his successes, Shang Teng Entertainment's new management was unwilling to fund Xue's next album in 2010. During this period, he fell into depression, and lost weight sharply.

=== 2011–2015: Self-funded music ===
In 2011, Xue opened his own hotpot restaurant, Shang Shang Qian (上上谦), its successes allowed him to keep pursuing music. In July 2012, Xue marked the end of his seven-year contract with Shang Teng Entertainment with the announcement of his fifth album Several Of... (几个薛之谦). He briefly signed with Shanghai Kunhong Media but soon terminated the contract due to Kunhong's inability to fulfill said contract.

In 2013, Xue signed with Ocean Butterflies and released his sixth album An Unexpected Journey (意外). It debuted at the top of Sino Chart and remained there for two weeks. In 2014, Xue appeared on many Chinese variety shows because "doing variety shows is to make money, and the ultimate goal of making money is to return to making music." He later called his style of humor during this period "hard humor" because he had to force himself to exaggerate his affectations for comedic effect.

In 2015, Xue founded his own streetwear brand Dangerous People. He gained significant popularity on Weibo for his humorous posts and later said the sudden fame was jarring but he was grateful for the chance to share his music with more people. On June 8, he released his first EP, Gentleman (绅士), which contained the highly popular song "Actor" (演员), one of the most-viewed Chinese music video on YouTube and one of the most-streamed Mando-pop songs on Spotify. On October 17, Xue released his second EP Half, which surpassed 100 million streams in less than a month.

=== 2016–2020: Commercial success ===
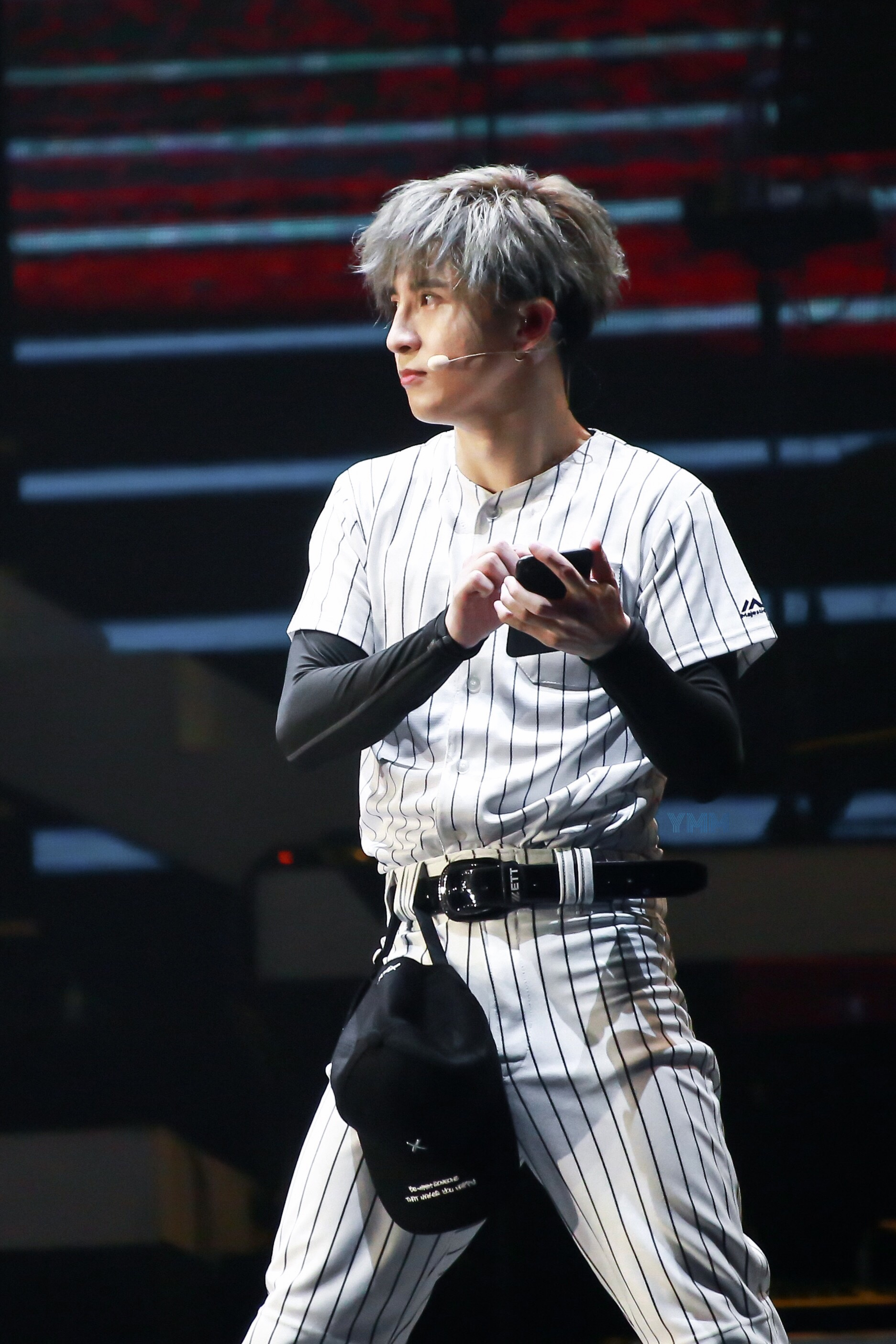
Xue in June 2017, I Think I've Seen You Somewhere Tour

In 2016, Xue changed his English name from "Jacky" to "Joker" as "Jacky" was the result of a guessing game he played at his debut and "Joker" reflected his sense of humor. In an effort for the audience to connect his name to his music after the success of "Actor", Xue pushed himself to appear in more than 40 variety shows. He was named "No. 1 Model Worker in Variety Shows" and ranked tenth on data analysis agency Standard Ranking's list of internet celebrities commercial value. However, the packed schedule took its toll on his physical and mental health. In July, Xue produced and released his seventh album Beginner (初学者), which won multiple awards, and was named Album of the Year on Apple Music's 2016 year-end list.

In January 2017, Xue was hospitalized due to acute gastroenteritis and later stated he plans to shift his focus to music, working toward becoming "Eason Chan of mainland and shedding the variety show star persona. In April, he embarked on his first concert tour I Think I've Seen You Somewhere Tour (我好像在哪见过你巡回演唱会). In June, Madame Tussauds Shanghai unveiled a wax figure of Xue. In December, Xue released his acclaimed eighth album The Crossing (渡). By the end of 2017, the total stream count of his songs across all Chinese platforms exceeded 12.7 billion. In early 2018, Xue suffered from laryngitis for several months before making a full recovery. In July, he began his Skyscraper World Tour (摩天大楼世界巡回演唱会). On December 31, he released his ninth album Freak (怪咖), which was well-received. In 2017 and 2018, Xue ranked first amongst solo artists cumulative playback volume on QQ Music.

In 2019, Xue concluded the Skyscraper World Tour in Hong Kong on May 19, setting the record for highest concert box office by a mainland China male singer. From July to November, he headlined four music festivals, debuting the "Joker" stage persona that was later officially adopted in 2023. In December, Xue released his tenth album Dust (尘) and was named Male Singer of the Year at CMIC Music Awards. Billboard magazine included "Puppet" (木偶人), the lead single from Dust, on their The Global No. 1s You (Probably) Never Heard list.

In 2020, Xue held his first online concert Dust in the World (尘浮世间线上音乐会) on May 23. On December 31, he released his eleventh album Extraterrestrial (天外来物). The title track "Extraterrestrial" was named among the Best Songs of the Year and Xue was named Most Influential Male Singer of mainland China at the 2021 Tencent Music Entertainment Awards.

=== 2021–2024: Extraterrestrial World Tour ===
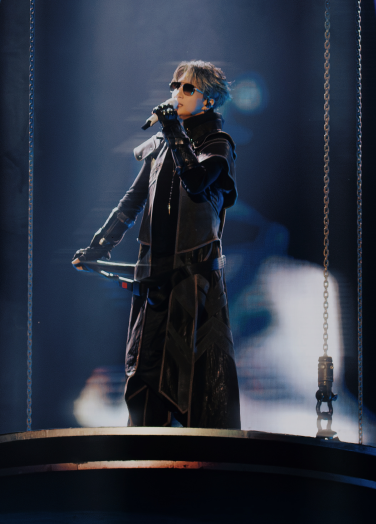
Xue in April 2024, Extraterrestrial World Tour

From May to October 2021, Xue headlined eight music festivals. On October 23, he embarked on the Extraterrestrial World Tour (天外来物世界巡回演唱会), which ranked first in the annual comprehensive concert box office with two shows in Suzhou and two shows in Guangzhou. He was among the Top 20 Artists of the Year and Top 10 Singer-Songwriter of the Year on Tencent Music Year End Charts. In 2022, Xue released his twelfth album, Countless (无数). He was named Best Male Singer at the 15th Migu Music Awards and Male Singer of the Year by the CMIC Music Awards for a second time. In December, he resumed the Extraterrestrial World Tour, previously paused due to COVID-19 restrictions, with one show at Wuyuan River Stadium.

In February 2023, Xue held his second online concert Ke (可线上演唱会) and drew more than 160 million views. From March to December, he continued the Extraterrestrial World Tour with 75 shows in mainland China, England, France, and Malaysia. Quzhou, the first stop of Xue's 2023 shows, placed first as fastest-growing city in the country's box office rankings due to his concerts. From March to October, Xue also headlined 11 music festivals. In July and August, Xue briefly served as a judge on Sing! China before the show was suspended for alleged mistreatment of former coach Coco Lee. In December, Xue ranked number one in total number of fans across all music streaming platforms in China with 83.62 million fans and he was the 8th Most Streamed Mandarin Pop Male Singers Worldwide on Spotify.

From January to August 2024, Xue continued the Extraterrestrial World Tour with 60 shows in mainland China, Singapore, United States, Canada, Australia, and New Zealand. On June 15, Xue was announced as the brand ambassador for QQ Speed, with the theme song "Relieve Boredom" (解解闷) ranking first on QQ Music rap chart and marking Xue's first appearance on that chart. In September, Xue performed "Rent or Purchase" (租购) on Melody Journey (音乐缘计划), which quickly topped the charts on QQ Music. On October 15, Xue became the first mainland China artist to hold an international stadium tour when he extended the Extraterrestrial World Tour in order to bring the same production design as his shows in China to his overseas audience. On November 22, Xue released his thirteenth album, The Guardian. From August 25 to December 15, Xue performed at 18 music festivals, all were in China except for the One Love Asia Festival in Singapore.

=== 2025-present: Recent activities ===
In January 2025, TVBS News reported Xue has acquired rights to his music videos after all of his music videos were reuploaded on Xue's own YouTube official channel. On January 28, Xue made his debut at the CMG New Year's Gala as the one of four artists and the only male artist to have a solo stage. As one of the exceptionally few singers granted song selection autonomy for the event, Xue chose "Fang's Words" (方的言) by Zhao Yingjun; the title is a wordplay on "dialect" (方言). During the post-performance interview, Xue said he chose "Fang's Words" because of the significance of dialect in Chinese culture and his own wish of fulfilling Zhao's dream of appearing on the CMG New Year's Gala.

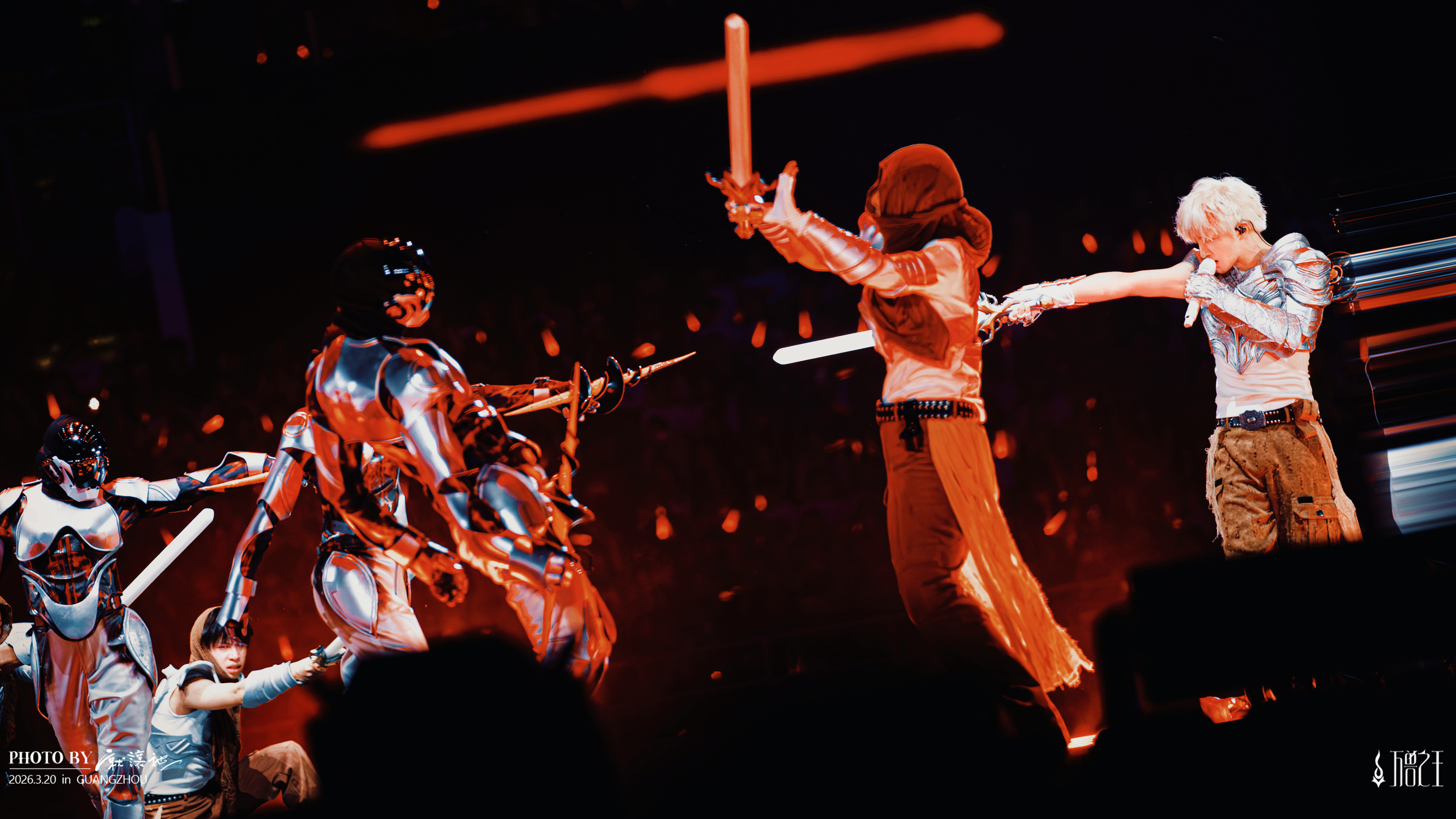
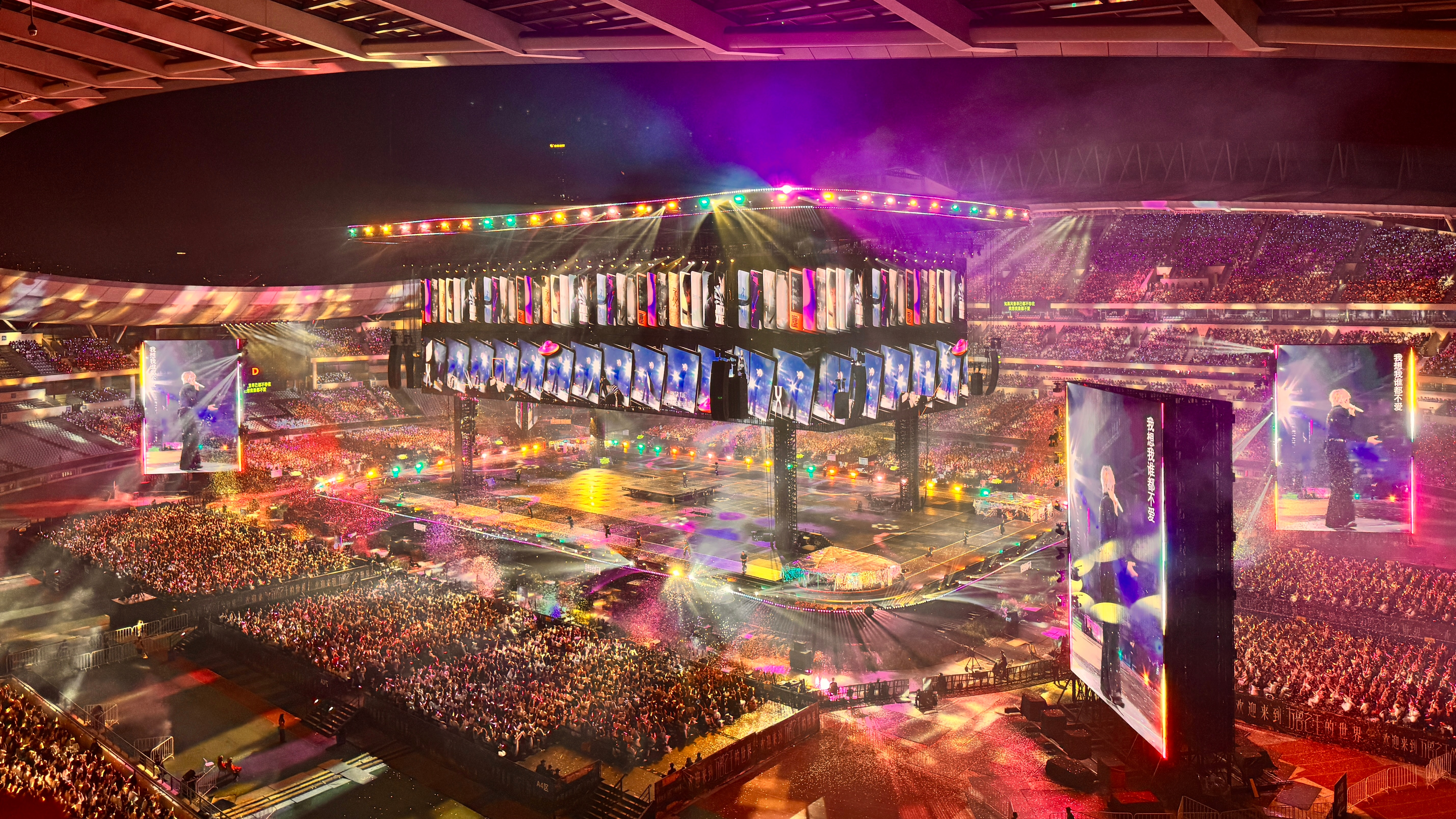
Xue in March 2026, The King of Beasts Tour

On February 14 and 15, Xue performed the final two shows of the extended Extraterrestrial World Tour at the Singapore National Stadium and received a positive review from Straits Times. On April 17, the physical version of The Guardian was released, selling more than 128,000 copies and exceeding ¥15 million (approximately $2 million) on QQ Music within 7 hours. On April 21, NetEase Cloud Music named Xue as the most-streamed Chinese artist with more than 34.1 billion streams and the artist with the third-highest number of songs surpassing 100 million streams at 64 songs in the platform's 12-year history. During the Labor Day Golden Week, Xue headlined five music festivals consecutively from May 1–5. On July 17, Xue continued the tradition of releasing a song on his birthday with the single "Leap" (跃), raising awareness for marine pollution. On August 5, Xue released "Axe Trick" (金斧子銀斧子), an industrial rock song based on Aesop's Fable The Honest Woodcutter. On September 20, Xue released the single "Farewell My Concubine" with Jane Zhang; it was named among the Best Songs of 2025 by Apple Music.

During the National Day Golden Week, Xue headlined seven music festivals from October 1-4 and 6-8. Beginning in October, Xue appeared on season 2 of Crush of Music and season 1 of Sing to Shine (中国唱将). On December 31, Xue appeared on Jiangsu TV New Year's Eve Concert for the 10th year in a row, performing a medley of six songs that ranked first in viewership at 1.943% with the lowest turnover rate at 0.95%.

On January 1, 2026, Xue headlined the Storm Electronic Music Festival, his first appearance at an electronic music music festival and a continuation of his recent experimentation with different music genres. In February, Madame Tussauds Singapore unveiled a wax figure of Xue ahead of the Lunar New Year celebrations. On February 13, Xue announced his fourth tour, The King of Beasts (万兽之王). The record-setting tour features a monumental 360-degree stage, approximately the height of a twelve-story building and the area of three-quarters of a football pitch. Its scale and immersive design made it the "natural home" for the world-first deployment of L-Acoustics's L1 loudspeaker and CS1 cardioid subwoofer in a large-scale production. Beginning with a series of nine sold-out shows in Guangzhou on March 20, the tour has drawn an attendance of more than 4 million across 90 shows as of November 11.

Beginning in late October, Xue appeared as a main cast member on season 3 of Crush of Music.

== Artistry ==
=== Musical styles ===
Xue is known for his distinctive emotional ballads, referred to as "Xue Style Love Songs" (薛式情歌/薛氏情歌) by music critics, the media, and listeners. Examples include unrequited love in "Gentleman", a relationship nearing its end in "Actor" and the aftermath of breakup in "Serious Snow." The love stories depicted in his songs tend to be more subtle and less dramatic, but that is precisely why they resonate with the audience and sound believable.

In addition to the ins and outs of love, Xue's songs also critique the distorted values of today's society and raise awareness for social issues because he believes "making music cannot be without a sense of responsibility." Examples include cyberbullying in "The Martian Has Come", materialism in "Skyscrapers, information disorder in "Cooperate", minority groups in "The Guardian", and marine pollution in "Leap".

His music often combines keyboard and string instrumentations with folk-tinged acoustic guitar and R&B beats. He has also incorporated other elements into his music, including rock, Chinese style, folk music, blues, classical music, urban contemporary music, electronica, rap, and industrial rock.

=== Lyricism ===
Each of Xue's songs contains "a story and lyrics play an important role." Xue's writing has received praise for its "sensitive observations" and "delicate depictions". His lyrics resonate among his listeners and have become the unique feature of his love songs. For his songs focused on exploring the philosophy of life, Xue's keen reflections of society and "bold but measured" expressions were lauded and have encouraged introspection and inspired change among his listeners.

The Straits Times noted the use of metaphors in his lyrics, such as a relationship being a performance in "Actor" and a lover being a force of nature in "Like the Wind". Conversational narration, imagery, and personification are also utilized in his writing, such as "Yellow Maple Leaves", "What Do You Want from Me" and "Serious Snow", respectively.

Xue has stated that he enjoys writing but can be overly intense about the process, particularly about choosing the correct words because he thinks "good lyrics must stand up to scrutiny, you can't have people get tired of them after listening to them twice." The majority of his songs carry a sorrowful or critical tone, as he revealed that he is "not very good at writing songs that are really happy, at all." In 2018, he revealed that he has not written a song that he is completely satisfied with.

=== Stage performance ===
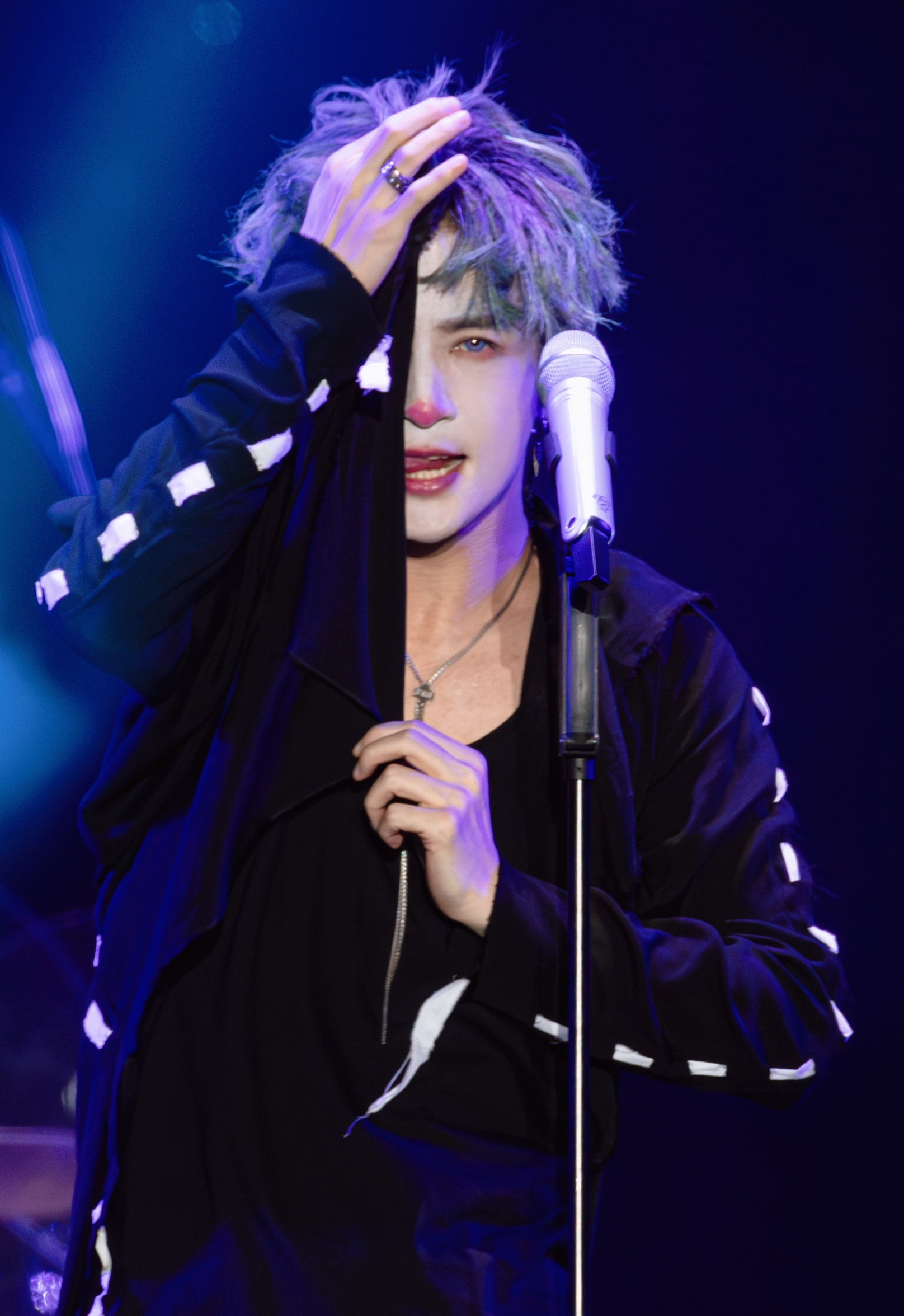
Xue in October 2023, as his "Joker" persona at Love Forward Music Festival

Xue intentionally tailors his performance to differ between recording and live stages, stating the former is "for the people who are willing to wear headphones" so his responsibility is to make the music suited for repeated listening while the latter is "for the people who are willing to come to the live performances" so his responsibility is to evoke emotional responses. He is known for his emotive stage performance style, playing up "the drama in performance without being showy" and singing with "a pleading intensity perfect for the grand anthems he is known for."

The Straits Times praised Xue's "authenticity, spontaneity and the fact that he can sing" and the "duality in his persona has created an unpredictability, almost mystery, about what he is going to do or say next" for his concerts' success.

In 2023, Xue officially adopted the stage persona "Joker" after performing in a variety of Joker-inspired styles since 2019. Its origin can be traced back to 2018, when Xue composed and wrote the song "Freak" on Infinite Song Season (無限歌謠季); for the performance, Xue and his partner Di Yang donned makeup and outfits inspired by the Joker. In 2025, Xue began headlining consecutive days at music festivals as both Xue Zhiqian and Joker Xue, with the former's set list composed of ballads and the latter's set list composed of rock songs.

=== Access to music ===
Xue's music are free to stream on various Chinese music platforms. He famously advised fans against purchasing the physical copy of Gentleman because it only contained three songs and recommended listening to his songs online for free; a rarity as Chinese music streaming platforms, such as NetEase Cloud Music and QQ Music, follow the freemium model and often require listeners purchase the song in addition to having an active subscription in order to listen to the songs in full.

He made this decision because he wanted his fans to "just come and listen to my songs, no need to spend money or worry" and he felt he can be more sincere about his music if money was not involved. Because he provides his music digitally at no charge, his albums do not appear on any digital sales charts.

== Social impact ==
=== Philanthropy ===
Xue is a longtime philanthropist, supporting organizations such as Beijing Hanhong Love Charity Foundation, Project Hope, Red Cross Society of China, and Social Assistance of China, as well as a variety of causes including but not limited to: children and youth, disaster relief, education, and environmental protection.

In April 2007, Xue participated in China Cultural Festival's key project "Friendship Tour along the Volga River", jointly organized by the Ministry of Culture of the People's Republic of China and the Russian Federation Cultural Film Agency. In July 2008, he passed the torch for the 2008 Summer Olympics in Zhengzhou. In April 2016, Xue served as the lead runner for Meifubao's Sunshine Charity Run. In June 2018, Xue served as promotion ambassador for the "Run Beijing" charity project, aimed to raise awareness for the importance of physical and mental health.

Xue ranked 24th on the 2016 China Charity Celebrity List.

=== Concert cancelation compensation ===
In September 2023, Xue set a new standard for concert cancelation compensation by being the first to proactively offer reimbursement for attendees' traveling and lodging expenses when he was forced to cancel the second show of the Chengdu stop of his Extraterrestrial World Tour due to high fever. Concertgoers were offered the choice to either refund or exchange their tickets for the encore Chengdu show on November 4. Out-of-town attendees were eligible for full reimbursement of travel and lodging expenses if they chose to refund their tickets; however, reimbursement eligibility is forfeited if they chose to exchange their tickets.

Tianjin Consumer Association praised him for "demonstrating the social responsibility that public figures should have" and "maintaining a harmonious consumer environment within the performance market." After, other artists began offering similar compensation for concert cancelation, but with limits on travel and lodging reimbursement amounts.

Xue offered the same compensation package twice more during his King of Beasts Tour in 2026, with an upgrade to the ticket exchange option that allows ticketholders to select a show of their choice within the exchange window. The first was on March 29, when the fifth show of the Guangzhou stop was severely impacted by torrential rain that caused malfunction of lighting equipment. He announced at the midpoint of the concert that he is canceling the remaining show because the stage effects were not up to his standards. The second was on August 8, when the second (August 8) and third (August 9) shows of Xue's seven-show Hangzhou stop were canceled in advance due to safety concerns stemmed from Typhoon Dolphin.

=== Consumer protection ===
Xue publicly opposes ticket scalping. He often performs multiple shows and adds extra shows at the same stop to increase the likelihood that concertgoers can purchase tickets on official platforms. The mainland China finale of his Extraterrestrial World Tour totaled 18 shows, with 6 shows each at 3 stops in different regions of China: northern (Beijing), southern (Shenzhen), and central (Suzhou). His current tour, The King of Beasts Tour began a series of nine shows in Guangzhou.

In addition, Xue is against product bundling. In July 2026, because all tickets were sold out for his 12-show Beijing stop, consumers who wish to attend were forced to purchase ticket bundles priced at almost or more than double the cost of an individual ticket. Xue stated "granting any platform the authorization to sell my tickets was never intended to facilitate the emergence of inflated prices or bundled sales" and such practice denied the consumers "the freedom to choose exactly what they want." Within 24 hours, Douyin removed the ticket bundles.

== Business ventures ==
=== Restaurant ===
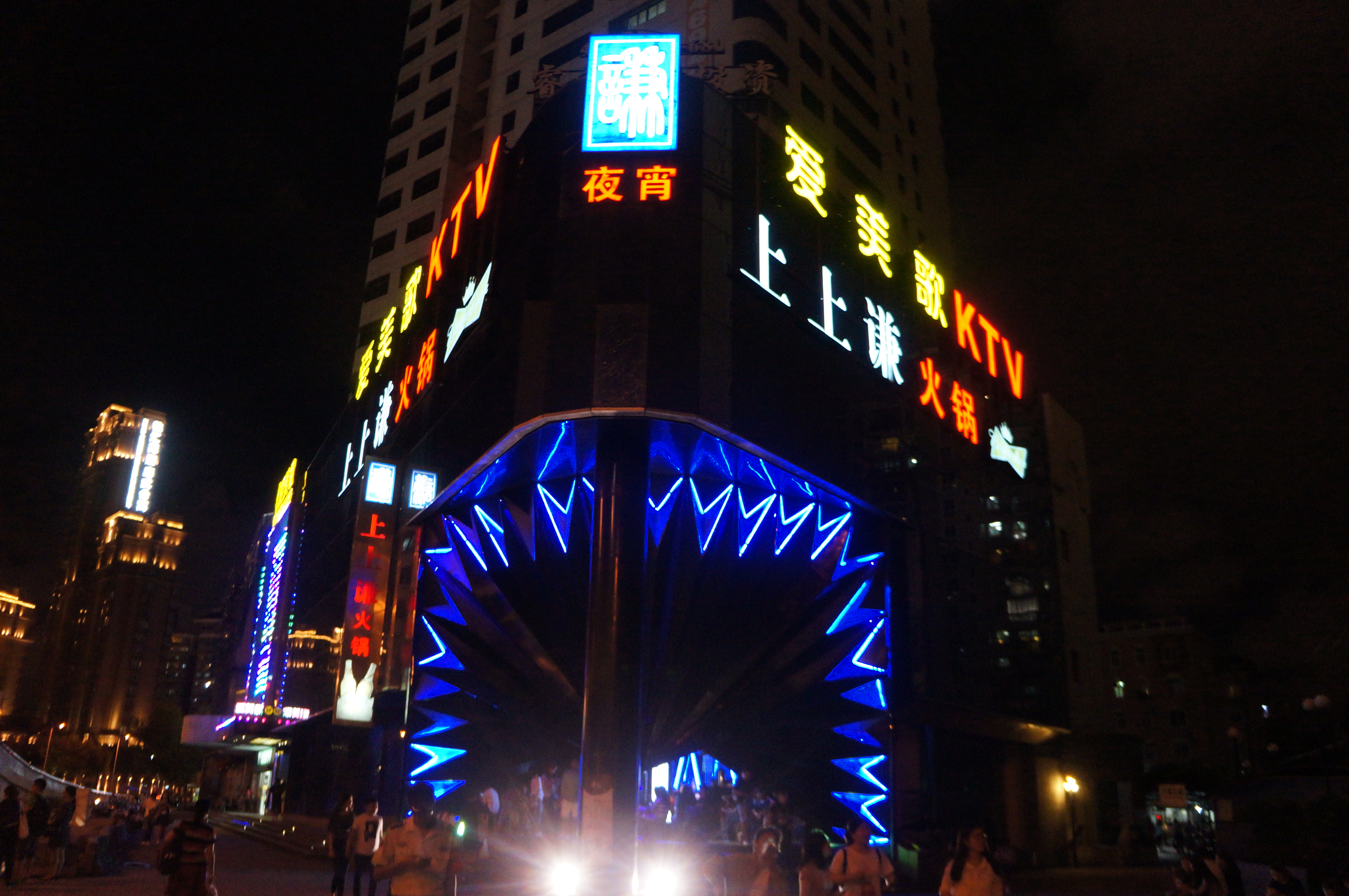
Shang Shang Qian in Shanghai, 2016

Xue stated "I want to use the money I earn from business to make music" because relying on music to make a living is "very tiring" and having other means of income means "making music is no longer a burden". In April 2012, Xue opened a hotpot restaurant named Shang Shang Qian (上上谦, a play on 上上签 meaning the luckiest draw and the character 谦 in his name). At its peak, Shang Shang Qian operated eight directly managed stores and twenty franchised stores. In February 2019, Xue transferred his shares in Shanghai Shangqian Catering Management, the company associated with the restaurant, to his father. In 2021, the company was deregistered. As of 2023, only 2 locations remain in Shanghai and Guangzhou. In 2026, after 14 years, all locations of Shang Shang Qian closed.

=== Streetwear ===
In 2015, Xue established the streetwear brand Dangerous People (abbreviated as DSP). The brand's logo is a figure wearing a paper bag, representing a person with yearning for peace but due to the darkness and misunderstanding of the world, he felt the need to hide himself. Xue serves as the brand manager and frequently promotes the brand on social media. Primarily sold online, Dangerous People opened its first brick and mortar store in Shanghai in August 2019. In 2025, Dangerous People announced Lars Huang as its first spokesperson.

=== Music label ===
In July 2020, Chaoshi Music was registered and established, its business scope includes cultural and artistic exchange activities, radio and television program production, performance management, and Internet cultural engagement. Xue's father owns 33% of the stocks and serves as a director. Chaoshi Music is part of Grand Vista Music Group, which is part of Tencent Music.

On December 24, 2021, Xue released a new single "Phoenix Feathers and Unicorn Horns" (凤毛麟角) through Chaoshi Music. On May 31, 2022, Xue posted a photo on his Weibo announcing the opening of Chaoshi Music. All of Xue's albums are acquired and currently owned by Chaoshi Music. Chaoshi Music produced and organized Xue's Extraterrestrial World Tour. In December 2024, Chaoshi Music served as the management company for Essay Wang's tour "The Sleepless". In March 2025, Chaoshi Music is announced as the organizer for Han Hong's "I Want To Become You" (我想成为你) tour, Roy Wang's "Under Universe" (宇宙超级无敌大狂欢) tour, and the newly established "New Bee" touring music festival (新蜂音乐节).

== Accolades ==
Xue's artistry has received praise from other music industry professionals. Producer Zhang Yadong said "Through these lyrics, you can understand his particularly delicate thoughts, which are very, very good" when reviewing Xue's song "Skyscrapers". Songwriter Yuan Weiren said "I think a musician like Xue actually possesses the most important part of many Chinese music creations. I especially hope to have the opportunity to work with Xue" when discussing mainland China singer-songwriters. Lyricist Cui Shu said "Xue is now on his way to becoming a national singer. He is well-known and has popular songs" at a forum hosted by Sina Entertainment.

Throughout his career, Xue has been recognized by Chinese Top Ten Music Awards, Global Chinese Music Awards, Music Radio China Top Chart Awards, Migu Music Awards, CMIC Music Awards, Tencent Music Entertainment Awards and many more for his music and popularity.

== Discography ==
Studio albums

- Jacky (2006)
- How Are You? (2007)
- Deeply Loved You (2008)
- Unfinished Songs (2009)
- Several Of... (2012)
- An Unexpected Journey (2013)
- Beginner (2016)
- The Crossing (2017)
- Freak (2018)
- Dust (2019)
- Extraterrestrial (2020)
- Countless (2022)
- The Guardian (2024)

== Filmography ==
While Xue has starred in films (e.g. The University Days of a Dog, What a Day!) and television series (e.g. The Queen of SOP, Mother Like Flowers, Boyhood), he is better known for his variety show presence. Because Xue has shifted his focus to music and concert tours since 2017, he has been more discriminating with his variety show appearances in recent years, choosing either long-standing or music-focused programs.

Mars Intelligence Agency (火星情報局) is the longest-standing variety show Xue has appeared on, starring as a main cast member from the first season in 2016 to the final season in 2024. Xue has appeared on multiple singing competition shows, the most notable being The Coming One (明日之子) in 2017 and Sing! China (中国好声音) in 2023 due to both shows having controversy regarding fairness that Xue called out publicly.

Earlier in his career, Xue tended to be the host or a panel member on music-oriented variety shows, such as Hidden Singer (誰是大歌神), Golden Melody (金曲捞), and Golden Melody 2 (金曲捞之挑战主打歌), in exchange for a chance for perform. In recent years, he tended to be a collaborator or mentor on shows such as Singing with Legends 3 (我们的歌第三季), In China (中國潮音), and Melody Journey (音乐缘计划).

== Concerts ==
=== Headlining tours ===
- I Think I've Seen You Somewhere Tour (2017)
- Skyscraper World Tour (2018–2019)
- Extraterrestrial World Tour (2021–2025)
- The King of Beasts Tour (2026-)

=== Concerts ===
- Live Concert in Shanghai (2008)
- Dust in the World Online Concert (2020)
- Douyin Online Concert: Ke (2023)

== See also ==
- List of most-attended concert tours
