= Serious Snow =

Single by Joker Xue

from the album Jacky
- Language: Mandarin
- Released: June 9, 2006
- Recorded: 2006
- Genre: Pop; R&B
- Length: 4:21
- Label: Shang Teng; Chaoshi
- Songwriter(s): Joker Xue

Joker Xue singles chronology
"Serious Snow" (2006)	"How Are You" (2007)

Music video
- "Serious Snow" on YouTube

"Serious Snow" (Chinese: 认真的雪; pinyin: Rènzhēndexuě) is a song by Chinese singer-songwriter Joker Xue. It was released on June 9, 2006, as part of his debut album Jacky (2006) and then included on his compilation album Unfinished Songs (2009) under Shang Teng; both have been acquired by Xue's own label Chaoshi Music. The song was written and composed by Xue.

Xue gained widespread attention due to "Serious Snow". It is credited as establishing the "Xue Style Love Songs", for which he is well-known.

"Serious Snow" performed well on charts and was one of the highest downloaded ringtones of the year. It is a staple in the setlist for Xue's three concert tours: I Think I've Seen You Somewhere Tour (2017), Skyscraper World Tour (2018-2019), and Extraterrestrial World Tour (2021-2025).

== Background ==
"Serious Snow" was inspired by Xue's first heartbreak. As Xue was writing the song, he sought feedback from producers multiple times but was always told to "do it boldly", a response that frustrated Xue until the album was completed and he understood the freedom he was given to create the music he wants.

Xue wrote the song after his girlfriend ended their relationship and it was snowing at the time when it hadn't snowed in Shanghai for many years, so the inspiration struck. When reflecting back on the song, Xue said his perspective on love was "quite childish" as it was focused on not wanting his lover to leave.

== Music video ==
The music video for "Serious Snow" was directed by Jacky Lee and starred Xue and Jia Qing as the male and female leads. To capture the atmosphere of the song, the music video incorporated use of snow in multiple settings: outside the window, flurrying as Xue sang, and falling indoor.

== Accolades ==
Awards and nominations for "Serious Snow"
Award	Year	Category	Work	Result	Ref.
China's Original Music Popular Chart 中国原创音乐流行榜季选颁奖典礼	2006	Most Popular New Artist (Male) 内地最佳新人奖	"Serious Snow"	Won	
China's Original Music Popular Chart 中国原创音乐流行榜季选颁奖典礼	2007	Top Hit (Mainland) 内地金曲	"Serious Snow"	Won	
Chinese Top Ten Music Awards 东方风云榜颁奖典礼	2007	Top 10 Hits of the Year 十大金曲	"Serious Snow"	Won	
Chinese Top Ten Music Awards 东方风云榜颁奖典礼	2013	Twenty Years of Top Hits 二十年至尊金曲	"Serious Snow"	Won	
Chinese Top Ten Music Awards 东方风云榜颁奖典礼	2023	Top Songs from the Past 30 Years 三十年至尊金曲	"Serious Snow"	Won	
Migu Music Awards 音乐盛典咪咕汇	2008	Most Promising Creative Idol 最具潜力创作偶像	"Serious Snow"	Won	

== Credits and personnel ==
- Joker Xue – vocals, lyrics, composition
- Cheng Peng – arrangement
- Jacky Lee – director

== Release history ==
Release dates and formats
Region	Date	Format	Label
Various	June 9, 2006	Digital download; streaming	Shang Teng
