= Beijing Pop Music Awards =

Annual Chinese music awards ceremony

The Beijing Pop Music Awards (Chinese: 北京流行音乐典礼), formerly known as Chinese Music Radio Awards (Chinese: 中国歌曲排行榜颁奖典礼) between 2000 and 2006, is a Chinese music awards founded by Beijing Music Radio in 1993 to recognize Chinese popular music. It was on hiatus from 2013-2017 before resuming in 2018 as Global Chinese Pop Chart Awards (Chinese: 华人歌曲音乐盛典).

== Ceremonies ==
Year	Venue	Location
1994	Capital Indoor Stadium	Beijing
1995	Capital Indoor Stadium	Beijing
2000	Capital Indoor Stadium	Beijing
2001	Capital Indoor Stadium	Beijing
2002	Capital Indoor Stadium	Beijing
2003	Capital Indoor Stadium	Beijing
2004	Great Hall of the People	Beijing
2005	Workers' Stadium	Beijing
2006	Beijing Exhibition Center	Beijing
2007	Century Theatre	Beijing
2008	Olympic Sports Center Gymnasium	Beijing
2009	Workers' Stadium	Beijing
2010	Olympic Sports Center Gymnasium	Beijing
2011	Olympic Sports Center Gymnasium	Beijing
2012 (Jan.)	Olympic Sports Center Gymnasium	Beijing
2012 (Dec.)	Taipei Arena	Taipei
2018	National Olympic Sports Centre	Beijing
2019	Venetian Arena	Macau

== Categories ==
2012 Beijing Pop Music Awards

- Most Popular New Artist
- Best New Singer-Songwriter
- Best New Artist
- Best Lyrics
- Best Composition
- Best Arrangement
- Best Single Producer
- Best Album Producer
- Best Singer-Songwriter
- Best Band/Group
- Style Breakthrough Award
- Best All-Round Artist
- Media Recommend Artist
- Best Female Stage Performance
- Best Male Stage Performance
- Best Female Singer
- Best Male Singer
- Best EP
- Best Album
- Most Popular Female Singer
- Most Popular Male Singer
- Outstanding Achievement Award
- Songs of the Year
