= TME Physical Album Sales Chart =

Record sales chart in China

The TME Physical Album Sales Chart (Chinese: 腾讯音乐实体专辑榜) is a sales chart in China established by Tencent Music in 2023 and includes retroactive rankings starting from September 2021.

The TME Physical Album Sales Chart ranks the physical record sales for albums, both CD and LP formats, based on data from QQ Music and KuGou Music. It does not include digital sales data or physical sales data from other platforms. Refunds are taken into account when calculating sales for the week. The TME Physical Album Sales Chart contains four lists: Weekly, Monthly, Annual, and Overall. Weekly and Monthly lists show the top 20 while Annual and Overall show the top 100.

Charts are updated daily.

Annual chart results are featured in the yearly Tencent Music music reports.

== List of monthly number-one albums ==
Year	Month	Album	Artist
2021	September	The Pack	PANTHEPACK
2021	October	The Pack	PANTHEPACK
2021	November	The Pack	PANTHEPACK
2021	December	Summer Time 夏野了	Roy Wang
2022	January	Lonely Planet 幼鸟指南	Mao Buyi
2022	February	INTO1'S WONDERLAND 2021	INTO1
2022	March	Pilgrams 朝圣者	Liu Ye
2022	April	Awaken 醒	Yao Chen
2022	May	Jay Chou 10 Years 杰伦十代	Jay Chou
2022	June	Intermezzo 幕间剧	Kelly Yu
2022	July	XANADU	Liu Yuxin
2022	August	2022	Yico Zeng
2022	September	Greatest Works of Art 最伟大的作品	Jay Chou
2022	October	Magic Man	Jackson Wang
2022	November	IX	Ju Jingyi
2022	December	Bedazzling 客厅狂欢	Roy Wang
2023	January	T	Zhu Zhengting
2023	February	Utopian Boy 乌托邦少年	Teens In Times
2023	March	It's Me 是我	Kelly Yu
2023	April	Special Guest 嘉宾	Bird Zhang
2023	May	Liu Yanfen 刘艳芬	Jackson Yee
2023	June	Liu Yanfen 刘艳芬	Jackson Yee
2023	July	SIDE L	Luo Yizhou
2023	August	Ten Years 十年	TFBoys
2023	September	21st Century Romance 21世纪罗曼史	Silence Wang
2023	October	Liu Yanfen 刘艳芬	Jackson Yee
2023	November	Ten Directions 十方艺念	Liu Yu
2023	December	Ten Years	TFBoys
2024	January	Ten Years	TFBoys
2024	February	Liu Yanfen 刘艳芬	Jackson Yee
2024	March	Prologue 序章	Santa Uno
2024	April	Captain	Liu Yu
2024	May	Liu Yanfen 刘艳芬	Jackson Yee
2024	June	Step	Lay Zhang
2024	July	Step	Lay Zhang
2024	August	Cosmic Poet 宇宙诗人	Liu Yu
2024	September	Cosmic Poet 宇宙诗人	Liu Yu
2024	October	Hometown Scroll 故乡长卷	Holdoumen
2024	November	Singer 歌者	Zhang Yunlei
2024	December	We 我们	Xiao Zhan
2025	January	We 我们	Xiao Zhan
2025	February	Beyond Utopia 叁重楼	Teens in Time
2025	March	Unfold a Day 展开一天	Holdoumen
2025	April	The Guardian 守村人	Joker Xue
2025	May	Kai Tian 开天	Lay Zhang
2025	June	Not Bad 要得	Jason Zhang
2025	July	My Odyssey	Bai Lu
2025	August	We 我们	Xiao Zhan
2025	September	—	—
2025	October	—	—
2025	November	—	—
2025	December	—	—

== List of yearly number-one albums ==
Year	Album	Artist
2021	Summer Time 夏野了	Roy Wang
2022	Bedazzling 客厅狂欢	Roy Wang
2023	Utopian Boy 乌托邦少年	Teens in Time
2024	We 我们	Xiao Zhan

== List of overall top-10 albums ==
Chart updated as of 23 August 2025.

Rank	Album	Artist	Release date
1	We 我们	Xiao Zhan	12 November 2024
2	Beyond Utopia 叁重楼	Teens in Time	12 February 2025
3	Utopian Boy 乌托邦少年	Teens in Time	20 January 2023
4	Ten Years 十年	TFBoys	5 August 2023
5	Liu Yanfen 刘艳芬	Jackson Yee	25 April 2023
6	Bedazzling 客厅狂欢	Roy Wang	8 November 2022
7	Summer Time 夏野了	Roy Wang	28 August 2021
8	Hometown Scroll 故乡长卷	Holdoumen	6 October 2024
9	Step	Lay Zhang	14 June 2024
10	Not Bad 要得	Jason Zhang	20 July 2025

=== Artists by total number of albums ===
The following artists have two or more albums ranked among the top 100 on the overall physical album sales chart.

Chart updated as of 23 August 2025.

Position	Artist	Number of albums
1	Joker Xue	8
2	Jay Chou	5
3	Liu Yu	4
3	Silence Wang	4
3	Lay Zhang	4
4	Yao Chen	3
4	Lars Huang	3
4	Huang Minghao	3
4	Teens in Time	3
5	G-Dragon	2
5	Lu Han	2
5	Holdoumen	2
5	Liu Yuxin	2
5	Ren Jialun	2
5	Allen Su	2
5	Jackson Wang	2
5	Roy Wang	2
5	Wang Zhengliang	2
5	Kelly Yu	2
5	Jason Zhang	2
