= KuGou =

Chinese music streaming service operated by Tencent Music

- Developer: Tencent Music
- Initial release: 2004; 22 years ago
- Operating system: Android, iOS, Web, Windows
- Type: Music streaming
- Website: www.kugou.com

KuGou (Chinese: 酷狗音乐; pinyin: KùGǒu Yīnyuè; lit. 'Cool Dog Music') is a Chinese music streaming and download service established in 2004 and owned by Tencent Music.

It has more than 800 million users. A merger between China Music Corporation and Tencent's QQ Music (QQ音乐) was announced on July 15, 2016. The services are expected to continue being offered separately. Together with Kuwo (酷我音乐), another online music service also owned by Tencent Music, KuGou holds a music award ceremony, the KU Music Asian Music Awards, also known as Cool Music Asia Festival Award. The service is only available in Mainland China.
