= List of awards and nominations received by Joker Xue =

Joker Xue awards and nominations
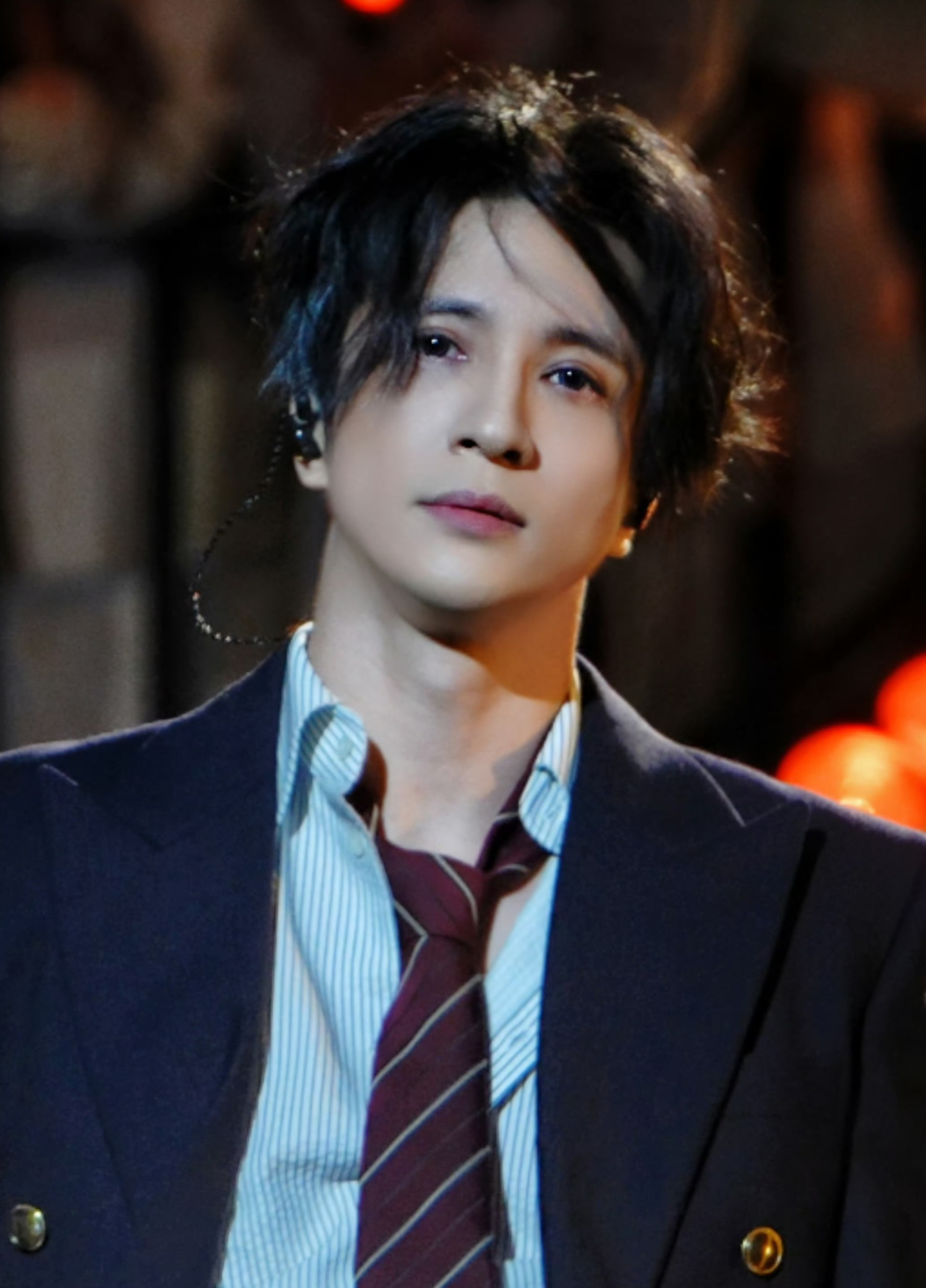
- Xue in June 2025, Bilibili Forever 22 Graduation Concert
Awards and nominations
Award	Wins	Nominations

Totals (Note: Certain award groups do not simply award one winner. They acknowledge several different recipients, have runners-up, and have third place. Since this is a specific recognition and is different from losing an award, runner-up mentions are considered wins in this award tally. For simplification and to avoid errors, each award in this list has been presumed to have had a prior nomination.)
- Wins: 173
- Nominations: 229

This is a list of awards and nominations received by Chinese singer-songwriter Joker Xue.

Xue debuted in 2005 and won multiple Best New/Most Popular Artist awards. He released four albums in the 2000s: Jacky in 2006, How Are You? in 2007, Deeply Loved You in 2008, and Unfinished Songs in 2009. Of those albums, he received recognition for the following singles: "Deeply Loved You", "How Are You", "Legend", "Serious Snow", "Unfinished Songs", and "Yellow Maple Leaves". For his third album, Deeply Loved You, Xue received an unprecedented seven nominations from Beijing Pop Music Awards in 2008.

In 2010s, Xue released five albums: Several Of... in 2012, An Unexpected Journey in 2013, Beginner in 2016, The Crossing in 2017, Freak in 2018, and Dust in 2019. Of those albums, he received recognition for the following singles: "Actor", "Ambiguous", "Animal World", "An Unexpected Journey", "As Long As We Have Loved", "Beginner", "Freak", "Gentleman", "Half", "I Finally Became Someone Else's Woman", "I Know That You Know", "I'm Afraid", "The Mute", "Noble", "Puppet", "Skyscrapers", "Talent", and "Ugly". Xue gained much acclaim and popularity from the album Beginner, especially for the song "Actor", one of the most viewed Chinese music videos on YouTube. He continued to be recognized for his artistry, winning the CMIC Music Awards Artist of the Year (Male) award in 2019 for his work on Freak.

In the 2020s, Xue released three albums: Extraterrestrial in 2020, Countless in 2022, and The Guardian in 2024. Of those albums, he received recognition for the following singles: "Adoration", "AI", "But", "Countless", "Exhausted", "Extraterrestrial", "The Guardian", "Mocking", "Paper Boat", and "Turning Waste Into Treasure". Xue won his second CMIC Music Awards Artist of the Year (Male) award in 2021 for his work on Extraterrestrial, making him one of two artists (the other being Sandy Lam) and the only male artist to have won the award twice.

Xue has embarked on three tours: I Think I've Seen You Somewhere Tour in 2017, Skyscraper World Tour in 2018–2019, and Extraterrestrial World Tour in 2021-2025. Extraterrestrial World Tour is one of the most-attended concert tours with more than 5 million tickets sold.

In 2022, Xue opened his own company, Chaoshi Music.

== 2000s ==
List of awards and nominations received by Xue in 2000s
Year	Award	Category	Work	Results	Ref.
2006	Campus Heroes 天地英雄校园群英会颁奖典礼	Best New Artist 年度新人奖	—	Won	
2006	China Entertainment Starlight Ceremony 娱乐中国·2006星光大典	Most Popular Idol (Male) 最具人气偶像(男)	—	Won	
2006	China Fashion Awards 中国风尚大典	Best New Artist (Mainland) 风尚新人奖(内地)	—	Won	
2006	China's Original Music Popular Chart 中国原创音乐流行榜季选颁奖典礼	Most Popular New Artist (Male) 内地最佳新人奖	"Serious Snow"	Won	
2006	Chinese Top Ten Music Awards 东方风云榜颁奖典礼	Best New Artist (Silver) 东方新人奖 (银奖)	—	Won	
2006	Global Chinese Music Awards 全球华语歌曲排行榜颁奖典礼	Most Popular New Artist (Male) 最受欢迎新人奖(男)	—	Won	
2006	Global Chinese Music Awards 全球华语歌曲排行榜颁奖典礼	Top 20 Hits of the Year 二十大最受欢迎金曲	"Yellow Maple Leaves"	Nominated	
2006	Music Pioneer Awards; 9+2音乐先锋榜	Best New Artist; 9+2先锋新人奖	—	Won	
2006	Southeast Music Chart Awards 东南劲爆音乐榜颁奖典礼	Most Popular Artist (Male – Mainland) 最受欢迎男歌手奖(内地)	—	Won	
2006	TOM Entertainment Internet Heroes Ceremony; TOM娱乐网络英雄盛典	Most Promising New Artist Award 年度最具潜力歌手新人奖	—	Won	
2006	Top Chinese Music Awards 音乐风云榜年度盛典	Top Five Most Popular Male Artists (Mainland) 最受欢迎男歌手五强(内地)	—	Won	
2006	Top Chinese Music Awards 音乐风云榜年度盛典	Ultimate Artist 极致人物奖	—	Won	
2007	Beijing Pop Music Awards 北京流行音乐典礼	Best New Artist 最受欢迎新人奖	—	Won	
2007	Beijing Pop Music Awards 北京流行音乐典礼	Top Hit of the Year 年度金曲	"Yellow Maple Leaves"	Won	
2007	China Music Awards 全球华语音乐榜中榜颁奖典礼	Media Recommended Artist 传媒推荐奖	—	Won	
2007	China's Original Music Popular Chart 中国原创音乐流行榜总选颁奖典礼	Top Hit (Mainland) 内地金曲	"Serious Snow"	Won	
2007	China's Original Music Popular Chart 中国原创音乐流行榜总选颁奖典礼	Outstanding Performance 飞跃表现奖	—	Won	
2007	Chinese Top Ten Music Awards 东方风云榜颁奖典礼	Top 10 Hits of the Year 十大金曲	"Serious Snow"	Won	
2007	Music Radio China Top Chart Awards; Music Radio中国Top排行榜颁奖典礼	Most Popular Artist on College Campuses (Mainland) 内地校园人气大奖	Jacky	Won	
2007	Music Radio China Top Chart Awards; Music Radio中国Top排行榜颁奖典礼	Best New Artist (Mainland) 内地最佳演绎新人	—	Nominated	
2007	New Entertainment Charitable Star Ceremony 新娱乐慈善群星会	The Most Caring New Artist Award 最具爱心闪电新人奖	—	Won	
2008	Beijing Pop Music Awards 北京流行音乐典礼	Top 20 Hits of the Year 二十大金曲	"How Are You"	Won	
2008	China's Original Music Popular Chart 中国原创音乐流行榜总选颁奖典礼	Most Promising Singer 最具潜质歌手奖	"How Are You"	Won	
2008	Chinese Top Ten Music Awards 东方风云榜颁奖典礼	Most Popular Local Artist 本地人气歌手	—	Won	
2008	Migu Music Awards 音乐盛典咪咕汇	Most Promising Creative Idol 最具潜力创作偶像	"Serious Snow"	Won	
2008	Music Radio China Top Chart Awards; Music Radio中国Top排行榜颁奖典礼	Top Hit of the Year (Mainland) 内地年度金曲	"How Are You"	Won	
2008	Music Radio China Top Chart Awards; Music Radio中国Top排行榜颁奖典礼	Most Popular Artist (Male – Mainland) 内地年度最受欢迎男歌手	—	Won	
2009	Beijing Pop Music Awards 北京流行音乐典礼	Top 20 Hits of the Year 二十大金曲	"Deeply Loved You"	Won	
2009	Beijing Pop Music Awards 北京流行音乐典礼	Album of the Year 年度最佳专辑	Deeply Loved You	Nominated	
2009	Beijing Pop Music Awards 北京流行音乐典礼	Artist of the Year (Male) 年度最佳男歌手	—	Nominated	
2009	Beijing Pop Music Awards 北京流行音乐典礼	Most Popular Artist (Male) 年度最受欢迎男歌手	—	Nominated	
2009	Beijing Pop Music Awards 北京流行音乐典礼	Singer-Songwriter of the Year 年度最佳创作歌手	Deeply Loved You	Nominated	
2009	Beijing Pop Music Awards 北京流行音乐典礼	Album Producer of the Year 年度最佳专辑制作人	Deeply Loved You	Nominated	
2009	Beijing Pop Music Awards 北京流行音乐典礼	Top Hit of the Year 年度金曲	"Legend"	Nominated	
2009	CCTV Music Global Popular Song Festival; CCTV风云音乐环球红歌盛典	Media Recommended Creative Talent Singer 媒体推荐创新实力歌手奖	—	Won	
2009	CCTV Music Global Popular Song Festival; CCTV风云音乐环球红歌盛典	Most Popular Streaming Song 年度网络最受欢迎金曲奖	"Unfinished Songs"	Won	
2009	China Original Song Award 中國原創歌曲獎	Best Stage Performance (Mainland) 内地最佳舞台表现奖	—	Won	
2009	China Original Song Award 中國原創歌曲獎	Best Album (Mainland) 内地最佳专辑奖	Deeply Loved You	Won	
2009	Chinese Top Ten Music Awards 东方风云榜颁奖典礼	Best Stage Performance 最佳舞台演绎奖	—	Won	
2009	Global Chinese Music Awards 全球华语歌曲排行榜颁奖典礼	Top Hit of the Year 年度金曲奖	"Deeply Loved You"	Won	
2009	Music Radio China Top Chart Awards; Music Radio中国Top排行榜颁奖典礼	Best Stage Performance 年度最佳舞台演绎奖	—	Won	

== 2010s ==
List of awards and nominations received by Xue in the 2010s
Year	Award	Category	Work	Results	Ref.
2010	Chinese Top Ten Music Awards 东方风云榜颁奖典礼	Best Breakthrough of the Year 最佳年度飞跃	—	Won	
2011	Global Chinese Music Awards 全球华语歌曲排行榜颁奖典礼	Top 20 Hits of the Year 年度二十大金曲	"I Finally Became Someone Else's Woman"	Won	
2011	Global Chinese Music Awards 全球华语歌曲排行榜颁奖典礼	Regional Outstanding Singer (Shanghai) 地区杰出歌手奖(上海)	—	Won	
2012	Beijing Pop Music Awards 北京流行音乐典礼	Top Hits of the Year 十大金曲	"I Know That You Know"	Won	
2012	Chinese Top Ten Music Awards 东方风云榜颁奖典礼	Top 10 Hits of the Year 十大金曲	"I Finally Became Someone Else's Woman"	Won	
2012	Chinese Top Ten Music Awards 东方风云榜颁奖典礼	Song of the Year (Duet) 年度对唱歌曲	"As Long As We Have Loved"	Won	
2013	Chinese Top Ten Music Awards 东方风云榜颁奖典礼	Twenty Years of Top Hits 二十年至尊金曲	"Serious Snow"	Won	
2013	Chinese Top Ten Music Awards 东方风云榜颁奖典礼	Best Breakthrough Singer-Songwriter 最具突破创作歌手	—	Won	
2013	Global Chinese Music Awards 全球华语歌曲排行榜颁奖典礼	Regional Outstanding Singer (Shanghai) 地区杰出歌手奖(上海)	—	Won	
2013	Music Radio China Top Chart Awards; Music Radio中国Top排行榜颁奖典礼	Most Recommended Album (Mainland) 内地推荐唱片	Several Of...	Won	
2014	Chinese Top Ten Music Awards 东方风云榜颁奖典礼	Top 10 Hits of the Year 十大金曲	"An Unexpected Journey"	Won	
2014	Chinese Top Ten Music Awards 东方风云榜颁奖典礼	Best Singer-Songwriter 最佳唱作人	—	Won	
2014	Music Radio China Top Chart Awards; Music Radio中国Top排行榜颁奖典礼	Media Recommended Artist (Male) 年度传媒推荐男歌手	—	Won	
2014	Music Radio China Top Chart Awards; Music Radio中国Top排行榜颁奖典礼	Song of the Year 年度最佳金曲	"Ugly"	Won	
2014	Music Radio China Top Chart Awards; Music Radio中国Top排行榜颁奖典礼	内地最受欢迎男歌手	—	Nominated	
2014	V Chart Awards 音悦V榜年度盛典	Singer-Songwriter of the Year (Mainland) 内地年度创作歌手	—	Won	
2016	China Music Awards 全球华语音乐榜中榜颁奖典礼	Most Popular Singer-Songwriter (Male) 最受欢迎唱作歌手	—	Won	
2016	Chinese Top Ten Music Awards 东方风云榜颁奖典礼	Top 10 Hits of the Year 十大金曲	"Half"	Won	
2016	City Super Chart 城市至尊音乐榜	Top 20 Hits of the Year 年度二十大金曲	"Gentleman"	Won	
2016	Global Chinese Golden Chart Awards 全球流行音乐金榜颁奖典礼	Most Popular Male Singer of the Year 年度最受歡迎男歌手	—	Won	
2016	Global Chinese Music Awards 全球华语歌曲排行榜颁奖典礼	Top 5 Most Popular Singer-Songwriter 五大最受欢迎创作歌手奖	—	Won	
2016	Global Chinese Music Awards 全球华语歌曲排行榜颁奖典礼	Regional Outstanding Singer (Shanghai) 地区杰出歌手奖(上海)	—	Won	
2016	Global Chinese Music Awards 全球华语歌曲排行榜颁奖典礼	Top 20 Hits of the Year 年度二十大金曲	"Beginner"	Won	
2016	Global Chinese Music Awards 全球华语歌曲排行榜颁奖典礼	Most Popular Artist (Male) 最受欢迎男歌手奖	—	Won	
2016	Global Chinese Music Awards 全球华语歌曲排行榜颁奖典礼	Top 5 Most Popular Artists (Male) 五大最受欢迎男歌手奖	—	Won	
2016	KuGou Music Awards 酷狗音乐大赏	Hottest Song of the Year 年度最火单曲	"Actor"	Won	
2016	KuGou Music Awards 酷狗音乐大赏	Annual Top-of-the-Charts Artist 年度霸榜王	—	Won	
2016	Ku Music Asian Music Awards 酷音乐亚洲盛典	Most Popular Singer-Songwriter (Male) 年度最受欢迎创作人	—	Won	
2016	Ku Music Asian Music Awards 酷音乐亚洲盛典	Best Television OST Artist 年度电视音乐金曲艺人	—	Won	
2016	Migu Music Awards 音乐盛典咪咕汇	Top 10 Hits of the Year 年度十大金曲	"Actor"	Won	
2016	Music Pioneer Awards; 9+2音乐先锋榜	Best Original Song of the Year 年度最佳原创歌曲	"Beginner"	Won	
2016	Music Radio China Top Chart Awards; Music Radio中国Top排行榜颁奖典礼	Top Hit of the Year 年度金曲	"Actor"	Won	
2016	Music Radio China Top Chart Awards; Music Radio中国Top排行榜颁奖典礼	Artist of the Year (Male – Mainland) 年度最佳男歌手(内地)	—	Won	
2016	Music Radio China Top Chart Awards; Music Radio中国Top排行榜颁奖典礼	Most Popular Artist (Male – Mainland) 年度最受欢迎男歌手(内地)	—	Nominated	
2016	Music Radio China Top Chart Awards; Music Radio中国Top排行榜颁奖典礼	Most Popular Album of the Year 年度最受欢迎唱片	Beginner	Nominated	
2016	V Chart Awards 音悦V榜年度盛典	All-Around Artist of the Year 年度全能艺人	—	Won	
2016	V Chart Awards 音悦V榜年度盛典	Best Trending Artist 年度风向艺人	—	Won	
2017	Asian Music Gala 亚洲金曲大赏	Best Male Artist (Mainland) 内地最佳男歌手	—	Won	
2017	Asian Music Gala 亚洲金曲大赏	Most Popular Artist 现场人气王	—	Won	
2017	Canadian Chinese Pop Music Awards 加拿大至 HIT 中文歌曲排行榜	Male Artist of the Year (Mandarin) 國語男歌手	—	Nominated	
2017	Chinese Music Awards 华语金曲奖	Best Artist Marketing of the Year 年度最佳艺人行销	—	Won	
2017	Chinese Music Awards 华语金曲奖	Best Mandarin Male Singer of the Year 年度最佳国语男歌手	Beginner	Nominated	
2017	Chinese Top Ten Music Awards 东方风云榜颁奖典礼	Most Popular Artist (Male) 最受欢迎男歌手	—	Won	
2017	City Super Chart 城市至尊音乐榜	Best Male Singer of the Year (Mainland) 年度至尊男歌手(内地)	—	Won	
2017	City Super Chart 城市至尊音乐榜	Audience's Favorite Male Singer of the Year 年度听众最爱男歌手	—	Won	
2017	CMIC Music Awards 唱工委音乐奖	Best Pop Vocal Performance 最佳流行演唱	"Beginner"	Won	
2017	CMIC Music Awards 唱工委音乐奖	Album of the Year 年度专辑	Beginner	Nominated	
2017	CMIC Music Awards 唱工委音乐奖	Song of the Year 年度歌曲	"Actor"	Nominated	
2017	CMIC Music Awards 唱工委音乐奖	Best Pop Album 最佳流行专辑	Beginner	Nominated	
2017	Enchanting Dragon and Tiger Chart 醉心龙虎榜	Top Hit of the Year 年度顶尖金曲	"Animal World"	Won	
2017	Freshasia Music Awards 亚洲新歌榜年度盛典	Album of the Year 年度最佳专辑	Beginner	Won	
2017	Freshasia Music Awards 亚洲新歌榜年度盛典	Artist of the Year (Male) 年度最佳男歌手	—	Won	
2017	Freshasia Music Awards 亚洲新歌榜年度盛典	Music Video of the Year 年度MV	"Animal World"	Nominated	
2017	Global Chinese Golden Chart Awards 全球流行音乐金榜颁奖典礼	Top 20 Hits of the Year 年度二十大金曲	"Beginner"	Won	
2017	Global Chinese Golden Chart Awards 全球流行音乐金榜颁奖典礼	Most Popular Album of the Year 年度最受欢迎专辑	Beginner	Won	
2017	Global Chinese Golden Chart Awards 全球流行音乐金榜颁奖典礼	Artist of the Year (Male) 年度最佳男歌手	—	Won	
2017	Global Chinese Music Awards 全球华语歌曲排行榜颁奖典礼	Top 20 Hits of the Year 年度二十大金曲奖	"I'm Afraid"	Won	
2017	Huajiao Night Shining Star Award Ceremony 花椒之夜闪耀星芒颁奖盛典	Best Male Vocalist of the Year 年度最佳男歌手	—	Won	
2017	KuGou Music Awards 酷狗音乐大赏	Most Influential Male Singer of the Year 年度最具影响力男歌手	—	Won	
2017	KuGou Music Awards 酷狗音乐大赏	Most Popular Male Singer of the Year 年度最受欢迎男歌手	—	Won	
2017	Migu Music Awards 音乐盛典咪咕汇	Most Popular Artist (Male) 年度最佳人气男歌手	—	Won	
2017	Migu Music Awards 音乐盛典咪咕汇	Best-Selling Ringtone of the Year 年度最佳彩铃销量歌手	—	Won	
2017	Migu Music Awards 音乐盛典咪咕汇	Top 10 Hits of the Year 年度十大金曲	"Noble"	Won	
2017	Migu Music Awards 音乐盛典咪咕汇	Album of the Year 年度最佳专辑	The Crossing	Won	
2017	MTV Global Chinese Music Festival; MTV全球华语音乐盛典	Top 10 Hits of the Year 年度十大金曲	"Actor"	Won	
2017	MTV Global Chinese Music Festival; MTV全球华语音乐盛典	Top 10 Hits of the Year 年度十大金曲	"Half"	Nominated	
2017	MTV Global Chinese Music Festival; MTV全球华语音乐盛典	Most Popular Artist 最佳人气歌手	—	Nominated	
2017	Music Radio Global Pop Music Annual Festival; Music Radio 全球流行音乐年度盛典	Best Male Vocalist of the Year 年度最佳男歌手	—	Won	
2017	Music Radio Global Pop Music Annual Festival; Music Radio 全球流行音乐年度盛典	Most Popular Album of the Year 年度最受欢迎专辑	Beginner	Won	
2017	Music Radio Global Pop Music Annual Festival; Music Radio 全球流行音乐年度盛典	Top 20 Hits of the Year 年度二十大金曲	"Beginner"	Won	
2017	V Chart Awards 音悦V榜年度盛典	Album of the Year 年度最佳专辑	Beginner	Won	
2017	Weibo Awards 微博之夜	New Year's Hottest People List 新年正当红·人物榜	—	Nominated	
2018	China Music Awards 全球华语音乐榜中榜颁奖典礼	Best Artist (Male – Mainland) 最佳男歌手(内地)	—	Won	
2018	China Music Awards 全球华语音乐榜中榜颁奖典礼	Best Album (Mainland) 最佳专辑(内地)	The Crossing	Won	
2018	Chinese Top Ten Music Awards 东方风云榜颁奖典礼	Top 10 Hits of the Year 年度十大金曲	"Ambiguous"	Won	
2018	Global Chinese Golden Chart Awards 全球流行音乐金榜颁奖典礼	Canadian Chinese Radio Top Artist 加拿大中文电台点播冠军	"Animal World"	Won	
2018	Global Chinese Golden Chart Awards 全球流行音乐金榜颁奖典礼	Top 20 Hits of the Year 年度二十大金曲	"Animal World"	Won	
2018	Global Chinese Music Awards 全球华语歌曲排行榜颁奖典礼	Best Male Vocalist - Stage Performance 最佳舞台演绎男歌手	—	Won	
2018	Global Chinese Pop Chart 华人歌曲音乐盛典	Most Popular Artist (Mainland) 年度最受欢迎男歌手	—	Won	
2018	Global Chinese Pop Chart 华人歌曲音乐盛典	Top Hit of the Year 年度金曲	"Skyscrapers"	Won	
2018	Global Chinese Pop Chart 华人歌曲音乐盛典	Artist of the Year (Male – Mainland) 年度最佳男歌手(内地)	—	Nominated	
2018	Global Chinese Pop Chart 华人歌曲音乐盛典	Most Influential Concert Tour 年度最具影响力演唱会	I Think I've Seen You Somewhere Tour	Nominated	
2018	Migu Music Awards 音乐盛典咪咕汇	Artist of the Year (Male) 年度最佳男歌手	—	Won	
2018	Migu Music Awards 音乐盛典咪咕汇	Most Popular Artist (Male – Mainland) 年度内地最受欢迎男歌手	—	Won	
2018	Migu Music Awards 音乐盛典咪咕汇	Top 10 Hits of the Year 年度十大金曲	"Skyscrapers"	Won	
2018	NetEase Cloud Music Original Music Festival 网易云音乐原创盛典	Artist of the Year 年度歌手	—	Won	
2019	Canadian Chinese Pop Music Awards 加拿大至 HIT 中文歌曲排行榜	Top 10 Mandarin Singles of the Year 至 HIT推崇 國語 十大歌曲	"The Mute"	Won	
2019	CMIC Music Awards 唱工委音乐奖	Artist of the Year (Male) 年度男歌手	Freak	Won	
2019	CMIC Music Awards 唱工委音乐奖	Album of the Year 年度专辑	Freak	Nominated	
2019	CMIC Music Awards 唱工委音乐奖	Best Music Video 最佳音乐录影带	"Freak"	Nominated	
2019	Freshasia Music Awards 亚洲新歌榜年度盛典	Most Popular Original Singer of the Year 年度人气原创歌手	—	Won	
2019	Global Chinese Golden Chart Awards 全球流行音乐金榜颁奖典礼	Male Artist of the Year (Mainland) 年度最佳男歌手(内地)	—	Won	
2019	Global Chinese Golden Chart Awards 全球流行音乐金榜颁奖典礼	Most Popular Album of the Year 年度最受欢迎专辑	Freak	Won	
2019	Global Chinese Golden Chart Awards 全球流行音乐金榜颁奖典礼	Top 20 Hits of the Year 年度二十大金曲	"The Mute"	Won	
2019	Global Chinese Golden Chart Awards 全球流行音乐金榜颁奖典礼	Most Popular Artist of the Year (Male) 年度最受欢迎男歌手	—	Nominated	
2019	Global Chinese Golden Chart Awards 全球流行音乐金榜颁奖典礼	Most Popular Singer-Songwriter of the Year 年度最受欢迎创作歌手	—	Nominated	
2019	Global Chinese Music Awards 全球华语歌曲排行榜颁奖典礼	Most Popular Artist (Male) 最受欢迎男歌手	—	Won	
2019	Global Chinese Music Awards 全球华语歌曲排行榜颁奖典礼	Top 5 Most Popular Artists 五大最受欢迎男歌手	—	Won	
2019	Global Chinese Music Awards 全球华语歌曲排行榜颁奖典礼	Top 5 Most Popular Singer-Songwriter 五大最受欢迎创作歌手	—	Won	
2019	Global Chinese Music Awards 全球华语歌曲排行榜颁奖典礼	Top 20 Hits of the Year 年度二十大金曲	"Talent"	Won	
2019	Global Chinese Pop Chart 华人歌曲音乐盛典	Most Popular Artist (Male – Mainland) 年度最受欢迎男歌手(内地)	—	Won	
2019	Global Chinese Pop Chart 华人歌曲音乐盛典	Album of the Year (Mainland) 年度最佳专辑(内地)	Freak	Won	
2019	Global Chinese Pop Chart 华人歌曲音乐盛典	Top Hit of the Year 年度金曲	"Freak"	Won	
2019	Global Chinese Pop Chart 华人歌曲音乐盛典	Artist of the Year (Male – Mainland) 年度最佳男歌手(内地)	—	Nominated	
2019	Global Chinese Pop Chart 华人歌曲音乐盛典	Lyricist of the Year 年度最佳作词	"Talent"	Nominated	
2019	Global Chinese Pop Chart 华人歌曲音乐盛典	Producer of the Year (Mainland) 年度最佳音乐制作人(内地)	—	Nominated	
2019	Migu Music Awards 音乐盛典咪咕汇	Album of the Year 年度最佳专辑	Freak	Won	
2019	Migu Music Awards 音乐盛典咪咕汇	Top 10 Hits of the Year 年度十大金曲	"Puppet"	Won	
2019	Migu Music Awards 音乐盛典咪咕汇	Best-Selling Ringtone of the Year 年度最佳彩铃销量歌手	—	Won	
2019	Q China Annual Music Ceremony; Q China 年度音乐盛典	Best Artist of the Year 年度最佳歌手	—	Won	
2019	Q China Annual Music Ceremony; Q China 年度音乐盛典	Best Album of the Year 年度最佳专辑	The Crossing	Won	
2019	Q China Annual Music Ceremony; Q China 年度音乐盛典	Best Song of the Year 年度最佳单曲	"Skyscrapers"	Won	
2019	Tencent Music Entertainment Awards 腾讯音乐娱乐盛典	Best Artist (Male – Mainland) 年度最佳内地男歌手	—	Won	
2019	Weibo Awards 微博之夜	Original Musician of the Year 年度原创音乐人	—	Won	
2019	Weibo Awards 微博之夜	Person of the Year 年度人物	—	Nominated	

== 2020s ==
List of awards and nominations received by Xue in the 2020s
Year	Award	Category	Work	Results	Ref.
2020	Canadian Chinese Pop Music Awards 加拿大至 HIT 中文歌曲排行榜	Singer-Songwriter of the Year (Mandarin) 至 HIT 推崇國語唱作人	—	Won	
2020	Canadian Chinese Pop Music Awards 加拿大至 HIT 中文歌曲排行榜	Top 10 Mandarin Singles of the Year 至 HIT推崇 國語 十大歌曲	"Mocking"	Won	
2020	Chinese Music Awards 华语金曲奖	Best Mandarin Song of the Year 年度最佳国语歌曲	"Puppet"	Won	
2020	Chinese Music Awards 华语金曲奖	Top Ten Mandarin Songs 国语十大金曲	"Puppet"	Won	
2020	Chinese Music Awards 华语金曲奖	Best Singer-Songwriter of the Year 年度最佳唱作人	Dust	Nominated	
2020	Chinese Music Awards 华语金曲奖	Best Mandarin Male Singer of the Year 年度最佳国语男歌手	Dust	Nominated	
2020	Chinese Music Awards 华语金曲奖	Artist of the Year 年度艺人	—	Nominated	
2020	Chinese Music Awards 华语金曲奖	Lyricist of the Year 年度最佳作词人	"Puppet"	Nominated	
2020	Chinese Music Awards 华语金曲奖	Composer of the Year 年度最佳作曲人	"Puppet"	Nominated	
2020	CMIC Music Awards 唱工委音乐奖	Best Pop Album 最佳流行专辑	Dust	Nominated	
2020	CMIC Music Awards 唱工委音乐奖	Best Composition 最佳作曲	"Puppet"	Nominated	
2020	Global Chinese Golden Chart Awards 全球流行音乐金榜颁奖典礼	Male Artist of the Year (Mainland/Overseas) 年度最佳男歌手(中国大陆／海外)	—	Won	
2020	Global Chinese Golden Chart Awards 全球流行音乐金榜颁奖典礼	Most Popular Album 年度最受欢迎专辑	Dust	Won	
2020	Global Chinese Golden Chart Awards 全球流行音乐金榜颁奖典礼	Top 20 Hits of the Year 年度二十大金曲	"Half a Beat Slower"	Won	
2020	Tencent Music Entertainment Awards 腾讯音乐娱乐盛典	Most Influential Artist (Male – Mainland) 年度最具影响力内地男歌手	—	Won	
2020	Tencent Music Entertainment Awards 腾讯音乐娱乐盛典	Most Popular WeSing Artist 全民K歌年度传唱歌手	—	Won	
2020	Tencent Music Entertainment Awards 腾讯音乐娱乐盛典	Top 10 Hits of the Year 年度十大金曲	"Extraterrestrial"	Won	
2021	Asian Pop Music Awards 亚洲流行音乐大奖	Top 20 Albums of the Year 年度TOP20专辑	Extraterrestrial	Won	
2021	Asian Pop Music Awards 亚洲流行音乐大奖	Top 20 Songs of the Year 年度TOP20金曲	"Extraterrestrial"	Won	
2021	Asian Pop Music Awards 亚洲流行音乐大奖	People's Choice Award (Chinese) 大众选择奖(华语)	"Extraterrestrial"	2nd place	
2021	Asian Pop Music Awards 亚洲流行音乐大奖	Male Artist of the Year (Chinese) 最佳男歌手(华语)	Extraterrestrial	Nominated	
2021	Chinese Top Ten Music Awards 东方风云榜颁奖典礼	Top 10 Hits of the Year 年度十大金曲	"Extraterrestrial"	Won	
2021	CMIC Music Awards 唱工委音乐奖	Artist of the Year (Male) 年度男歌手	Extraterrestrial	Won	
2021	CMIC Music Awards 唱工委音乐奖	Song of the Year 年度歌曲	"Extraterrestrial"	Nominated	
2021	CMIC Music Awards 唱工委音乐奖	Best Mixing Project 最佳混音工程	"Paper Boat"	Nominated	
2021	CMIC Music Awards 唱工委音乐奖	Best Music Video 最佳音乐录影带	"Extraterrestrial"	Nominated	
2021	Migu Music Awards 音乐盛典咪咕汇	Artist of the Year (Male) 年度最佳男歌手	—	Won	
2021	Migu Music Awards 音乐盛典咪咕汇	Album of the Year 年度最佳专辑	Extraterrestrial	Won	
2021	Migu Music Awards 音乐盛典咪咕汇	Top 10 Hits of the Year 年度十大金曲	"Turning Waste Into Treasure"	Won	
2021	NetEase Cloud Music Awards 网易云年度音乐奖	Most Searched Artist of the Year 年度热搜艺人	—	Won	
2021	NetEase Cloud Music Awards 网易云年度音乐奖	Single of the Year 年度单曲奖	"Turning Waste Into Treasure"	Won	
2021	Tencent Music Entertainment Awards 腾讯音乐娱乐盛典	Most Influential Artist (Male – Mainland) 年度最具影响力内地男歌手	—	Won	
2021	Tencent Music Entertainment Awards 腾讯音乐娱乐盛典	Top 10 Hits of the Year 年度十大金曲	"Exhausted"	Won	
2022	Asian Pop Music Awards 亚洲流行音乐大奖	Top 20 Albums of the Year 年度TOP20专辑	Countless	Won	
2022	Asian Pop Music Awards 亚洲流行音乐大奖	Top 20 Songs of the Year 年度TOP20金曲	"Countless"	Won	
2022	Asian Pop Music Awards 亚洲流行音乐大奖	People's Choice Award (Chinese) 大众选择奖(华语)	"Countless"	9th place	
2022	Asian Pop Music Awards 亚洲流行音乐大奖	Male Artist of the Year (Chinese) 最佳男歌手(华语)	Countless	Nominated	
2022	Asian Pop Music Awards 亚洲流行音乐大奖	Album of the Year (Chinese) 年度最佳专辑	Countless	Nominated	
2022	Asian Pop Music Awards 亚洲流行音乐大奖	Best Collaboration Single 最佳合作单曲	"But"	Nominated	
2022	Canadian Chinese Pop Music Awards 加拿大至 HIT 中文歌曲排行榜	Composer of the Year 至 HIT 推崇作曲人	—	Nominated	
2022	NetEase Cloud Music Awards 网易云年度音乐奖	Artist of the Year (Male) 年度男艺人	—	Won	
2022	NetEase Cloud Music Awards 网易云年度音乐奖	Song of the Year 年度单曲奖	"But"	Won	
2022	NetEase Cloud Music Awards 网易云年度音乐奖	Album of the Year 年度专辑	Countless	Won	
2022	Weibo Music Awards 微博音乐盛典	Most Recommended Concert Tour 年度推荐演唱会	Extraterrestrial World Tour	Won	
2023	Asian Pop Music Awards 亚洲流行音乐大奖	Top 20 Songs of the Year 年度TOP20金曲	"Adoration"	Won	
2023	Canadian Chinese Pop Music Awards 加拿大至 HIT 中文歌曲排行榜	Male Artist of the Year (Mandarin) 至 HIT 推崇男歌手 (國語)	—	Nominated	
2023	China New Music Awards 中国新音乐排行榜颁奖盛典	Best Music Label 最佳音乐厂牌奖	Chaoshi Music	Won	
2023	Chinese Top Ten Music Awards 东方风云榜颁奖典礼	Top Songs from the Past 30 Years 三十年至尊金曲	"Serious Snow"	Won	
2023	Chinese Music Awards 华语金曲奖	Best Performance Management of the Year 年度最佳演出管理	Extraterrestrial World Tour	Nominated	
2023	Huading Awards 华鼎奖	Most Popular Mandarin Chinese Singer (Male) 华语最受欢迎男歌手	—	Won	
2023	NetEase Cloud Music Awards 网易云年度音乐奖	Top 10 Hits of the Year 年度十大热门歌曲	"Adoration"	Won	
2023	NetEase Cloud Music Awards 网易云年度音乐奖	Most Searched Artist of the Year 年度热搜艺人	—	Won	
2023	Wave Music Awards 浪潮音乐大赏	Song of the Year 年度歌曲	"But"	Nominated	
2023	Wave Music Awards 浪潮音乐大赏	Album of the Year 年度专辑	Countless	Nominated	
2023	Wave Music Awards 浪潮音乐大赏	Producer of the Year 年度制作	Countless	Nominated	
2023	Wave Music Awards 浪潮音乐大赏	Male Artist of the Year 最佳男歌手	Countless	Nominated	
2023	Weibo Music Awards 微博音乐盛典	Most Recommended Concert Tour 年度推荐演唱会	Extraterrestrial World Tour	Won	
2024	Asian Pop Music Awards 亚洲流行音乐大奖	People's Choice Award (Chinese) 大众选择奖(华语)	"AI"	9th place	
2024	Chinese Music Awards 华语金曲奖	Best Mandarin Male Singer of the Year 年度最佳国语男歌手	Countless	Nominated	
2024	Tencent Music Entertainment Awards 腾讯音乐娱乐盛典	Best Artist (Male – Mainland) 年度最佳内地歌手	—	Won	
2024	Tencent Music Entertainment Awards 腾讯音乐娱乐盛典	Best Concert Tour of the Year 年度演唱会	Extraterrestrial World Tour	Won	
2024	Tencent Music Entertainment Awards 腾讯音乐娱乐盛典	Top 10 Hits of the Year 年度十大金曲	"Adoration"	Won	
2024	Weibo Music Awards 微博音乐盛典	Most Recommended Song 年度推荐歌曲	"AI"	Won	
2024	Weibo Music Awards 微博音乐盛典	Most Recommended Concert Tour 年度推荐演唱会	Extraterrestrial World Tour	Won	
2025	Digital Music Annual Ceremony 数字音乐年度盛典	Digital Album of the Year 年度数字专辑	The Guardian	Nominated	
2025	Migu Music Awards 音乐盛典咪咕汇	Album of the Year 年度最佳专辑	The Guardian	Won	
2025	Migu Music Awards 音乐盛典咪咕汇	Top 10 Hits of the Year 年度十大金曲	"That Day On the Road of No Return"	Won	
2025	Wave Music Awards 浪潮音乐大赏	Best Pop Album of the Year 最佳流行专辑	The Guardian	Won	
2025	Wave Music Awards 浪潮音乐大赏	Producer of the Year 年度制作	The Guardian	Nominated	
2025	Wave Music Awards 浪潮音乐大赏	Male Artist of the Year 最佳男歌手	The Guardian	Nominated	
2025	Wave Music Awards 浪潮音乐大赏	Lyricist of the Year 最佳作词	"The Guardian"	Nominated	
2026	Tencent Music Entertainment Awards 腾讯音乐娱乐盛典	Social Impact Artist 年度社会影响力艺人	—	Won	
2026	Tencent Music Entertainment Awards 腾讯音乐娱乐盛典	Top 10 Songs of the Year	"Leap"	Won	
