= Puppet (disambiguation) =

A puppet is an inanimate object or representational figure animated by a puppeteer.

Puppet may also refer to:

== Entertainment ==
- Hand puppet, a type of puppet controlled by hand that occupies the interior of the puppet
- Puppetry, a form of theatre or performance which involves the manipulation of puppets
- Sock puppet, a puppet made from a sock

== Computing and Internet ==
- Puppet (software), an open source configuration management utility by Puppet, Inc
- Sock puppet account, an online identity used for purposes of deception within an online community

== Film and television ==
- Puppets (1916 film), an American short drama film directed by Tod Browning
- Puppets (1926 film), an American silent drama film directed by George Archainbaud
- Puppet (film), a 1957 Argentine comedy film
- Puppets (TV series), a weekly Russian TV show
- Puppet, one of the main characters in The Upside Down Show

== Music ==
- "The Puppet", a 1980 song by Echo & the Bunnymen
- "Puppet", a 1993 song by Lisa Germano from Happiness
- "Puppet", a 1998 song by Ringo Starr from Vertical Man
- "Puppet", a 2001 song by Thousand Foot Krutch from Set It Off
- "Puppet", a 2005 song by Warmen from Accept the Fact
- "Puppet", a 2010 song by The Saturdays from Headlines!
- "Puppet", a 2013 song by Jake Miller from Us Against Them
- "Puppet", a 2014 song by Karmin from Pulses
- "Puppets", a 1971 song by Curved Air from Second Album
- "Puppets", a 1979 song by Hugh Cornwell and Robert Williams from Nosferatu
- "Puppets", a 1981 song by Depeche Mode from Speak & Spell
- "Puppets", a 1998 song by Hum from Downward Is Heavenward
- "Puppets", a 2004 song by Joseph Arthur from Our Shadows Will Remain
- "Puppets", a 2008 song by Atmosphere from When Life Gives You Lemons, You Paint That Shit Gold
- "Puppets (The First Snow)", a 2010 song by Motionless in White from Creatures
- Puppet, a 2011 album by The Dreaming
- "Puppet", a 2019 song by Chinese singer-songwriter Joker Xue
- "Puppet", a 2019 song by Tyler, the Creator from Igor

== Other uses ==
- Puppet (artist) (born 1970), Swedish graffiti artist
- Puppet state, a nominal sovereignty controlled effectively by a foreign power
- Puppet bid, a conventional bid in the card game contract bridge
- Puppets (module), a 1989 module for the Dungeons & Dragons fantasy role-playing game
- Puppet The Psycho Dwarf, the ring name of the late midget wrestler, actor, and stuntman Stevie Lee Richardson
- Puppet, pet dog of Moors Murderer Myra Hindley
