= Extraterrestrial World Tour =

2021–2025 concert tour by Joker Xue

- Tour by Joker Xue
- Promotional poster example
- Associated album: Extraterrestrial (天外来物); The Guardian (守村人)
- Start date: October 23, 2021
- End date: February 15, 2025
- No. of shows: 145
- Attendance: 5.08 million

Joker Xue concert chronology
- Dust in the World Online Concert (2020）; Extraterrestrial World Tour (2021–2025); Douyin Online Concert: Ke (2023）

The Extraterrestrial World Tour is the third concert tour and second world tour by Chinese singer-songwriter Joker Xue. The Extraterrestrial World Tour spans a record-breaking 145 shows across four continents with 133 in Asia, 2 in Europe, 5 in North America, and 4 in Oceania. Tour attendance is approximately 5.08 million, making it among the most-attended concert tours of all-time.

== Background ==
On July 13, 2021, Xue announced the tour by posting the Extraterrestrial World Tour poster on Weibo. On July 24, at the Chaole Music Festival, Xue shared the tour is both a concert and a story with a lot of "silly plotlines" that should be "extremely fun." Extraterrestrial World Tour opened in October 2021 with two shows in Suzhou followed by two shows in Guangzhou the next month. In 2022, due to the COVID-19 pandemic, many of the announced dates were postponed and only the Haikou concert was successfully held on December 24, 2022. In March 2023, the tour resumed and for the rest of the tour, Xue mostly maintained the pace of one stop per week and frequently with several shows per stop.

Xue strives to lessen the burden of travelling to concerts for the attendees, promising to meet them "in their hometowns" because his principle is "if I take one more step, you will take one fewer step". In 2023, Extraterrestrial World Tour was listed as one of the tours with the most number of stops. Xue performed in 30 of China's 34 provinces with a finale of 18 shows, 6 shows each at 3 stops in different regions of China: northern (Beijing), southern (Shenzhen), and central (Suzhou).

On October 15, Xue announced on his Weibo that he is extending the tour with additional "Overseas Returned" stadium shows, with the same stage design and setlist as his shows in China, so his overseas audience can have the complete experience. He is the first mainland China artist to hold an international stadium tour.

== Concert synopsis ==
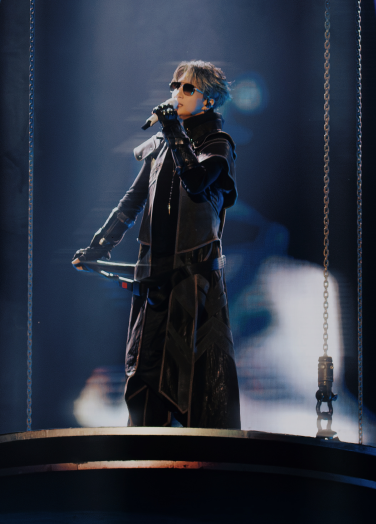
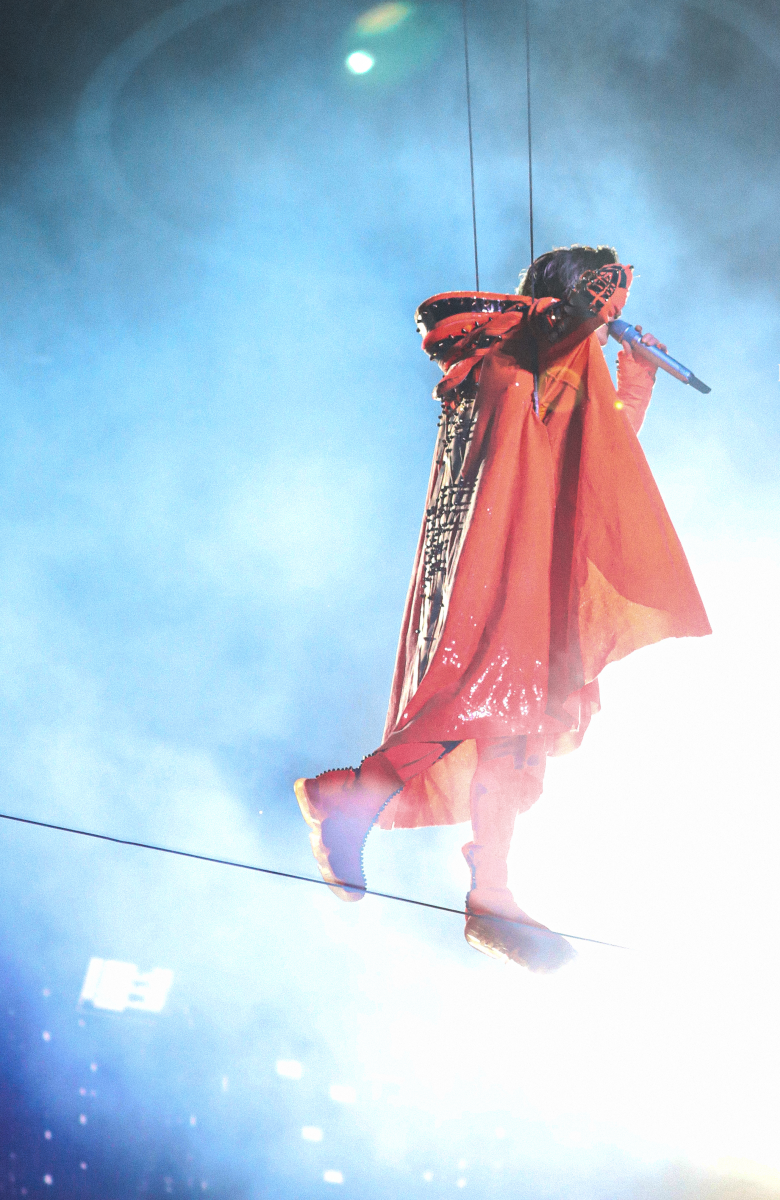
Xue, as 0717, arrives on Earth in Act I (right) & performs highwire walking in Act IV (left)

The Extraterrestrial World Tour is both a concert and a story. In it, Xue transforms into an interstellar executive, codename 0717, who was ordered to destroy Earth. However, through interactions with the attendees during the concert, 0717 is moved by the goodness of humans and chooses to sacrifice himself to save them.

Each concert consists of five acts, with pre-recorded videos filmed in a comedic manner to advance the plot as well as talking segments where Xue humorously interacts with different audience members, making them active participants in the story.

- Act I:
  - Pre-recorded video 1 introduces the "Regulations on the Joint Protection of Space Creatures," which Earth has violated.
  - Interstellar Executive 0717 arrives on Earth with the mission to destroy it, portrayed through "Extraterrestrial" (天外来物) and "The Return of the Prince" (王子归来).
  - In talking segment 1, 0717 questions the audience about buying scalped tickets, a practice Xue condemns.
- Act II:
  - Pre-recorded video 2 reveals 0717 must take three Earth species back to Interstellar Headquarters.
  - Human selfishness in escaping is highlighted through "Animal World" (动物世界).
  - In talking segment 2, 0717 discusses the phenomenon 碰瓷 (faking injuries for compensation), urging the audience to believe in people's good intentions.
- Act III:
  - He and the dancers wear gray wigs, portraying elderly women who fall on stage. The audience sings "Actor" (演员) in unison to help them back up, moving 0717 with this selfless act.
  - In pre-recorded video 3, 0717, confused by his emotions towards humans, travels back to Xue's 2017 tour through a "Medley" (组曲串烧) of over 15 songs. 0717 realizes he was once human and has been to Earth before.
  - A special guest performs a duet with 0717 and presents a necklace as proof of his past.
- Act IV:
  - In Pre-recorded Video 4, Interstellar Headquarters, impatient with 0717's progress, sends forces to destroy Earth.
  - 0717 negotiates a delay, expressing his belief in human potential through "Turn Waste Into Treasure" (变废为宝), but Headquarters is unmoved.
  - 0717 sacrifices himself to protect Earth, saying goodbye with "Accompany You to Wander" (陪你去流浪) and concluding 0717's storyline.
- Act V:
  - The audience calls for Xue's return by shouting his name instead of 0717. Xue returns as himself with "It's Been So Long" (这么久没见).
  - Xue performs songs such as "What Do You Want From Me" (你还要我怎样) and "Like the Wind" (像风一样) while interacting with the audience.
  - After summarizing the story and acknowledging the band and crew, Xue bids the audience goodnight with "Extraterrestrial" (天外来物).

International shows from November 2023 to March 2024 were held in arenas. Due to time and stage constraints, these 19 shows had the setlist and talking segments reduced and did not have special guests. The 5 additional international shows from November 2024 to February 2025 were held at stadiums and performed with full stage design and setlist, though no special guests were present.

== Stage design ==
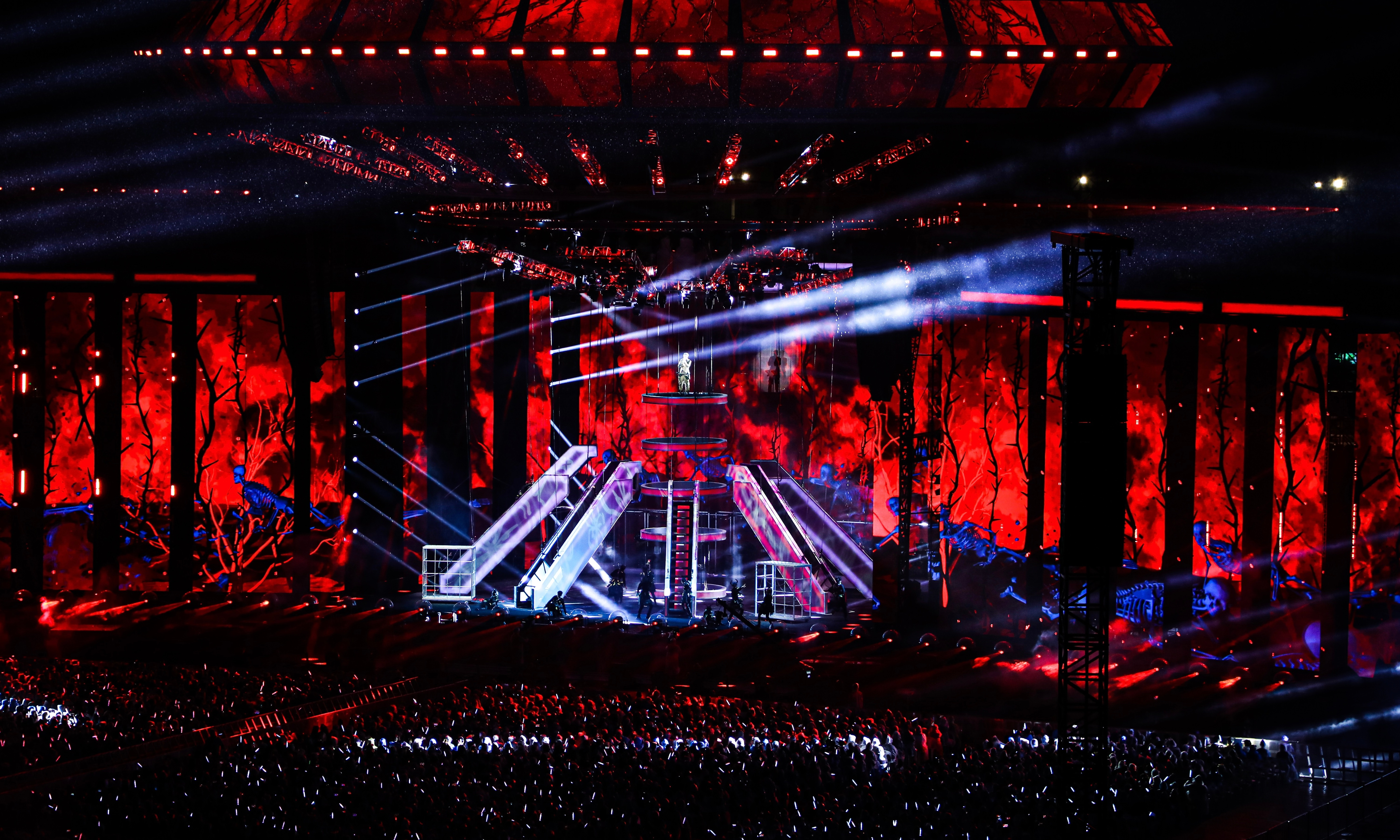
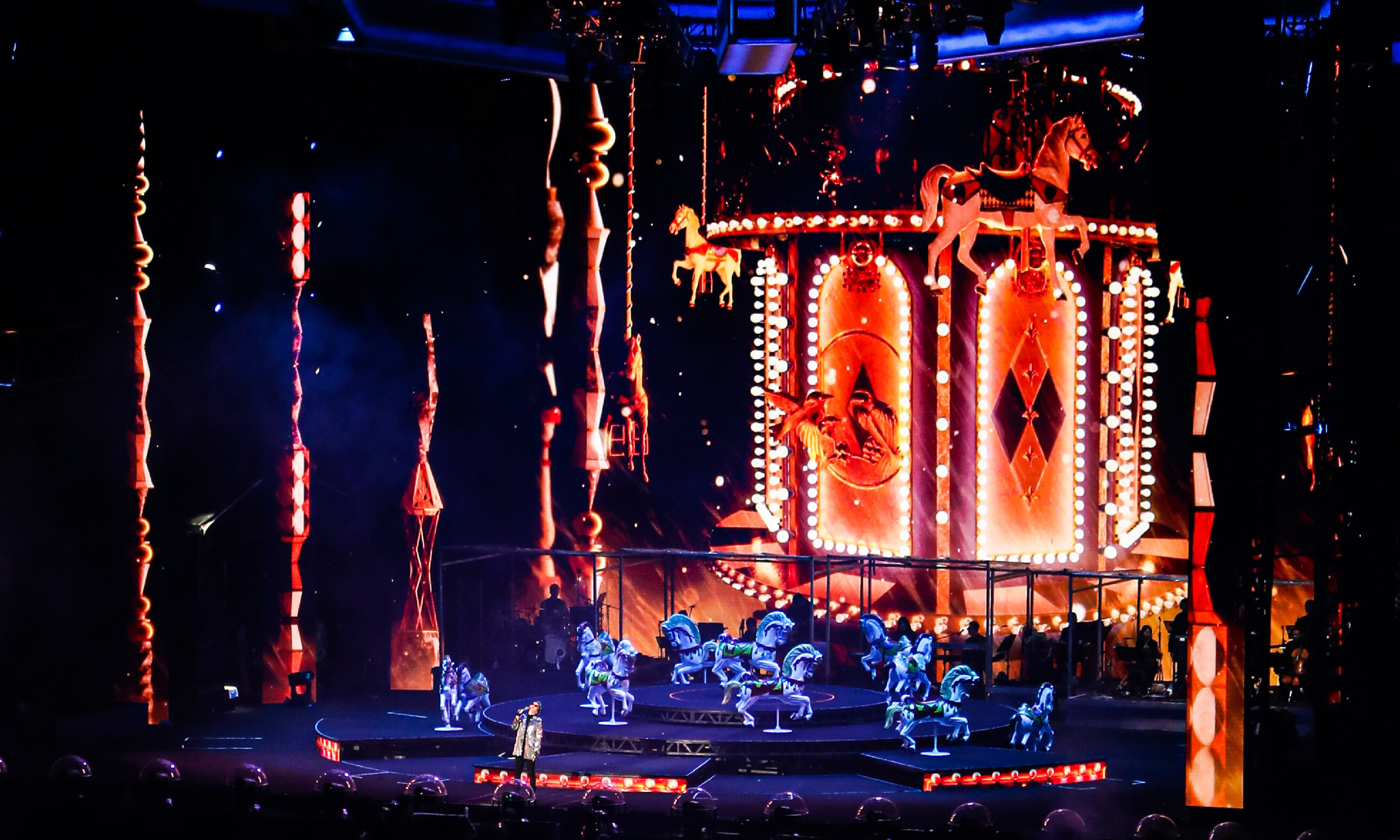
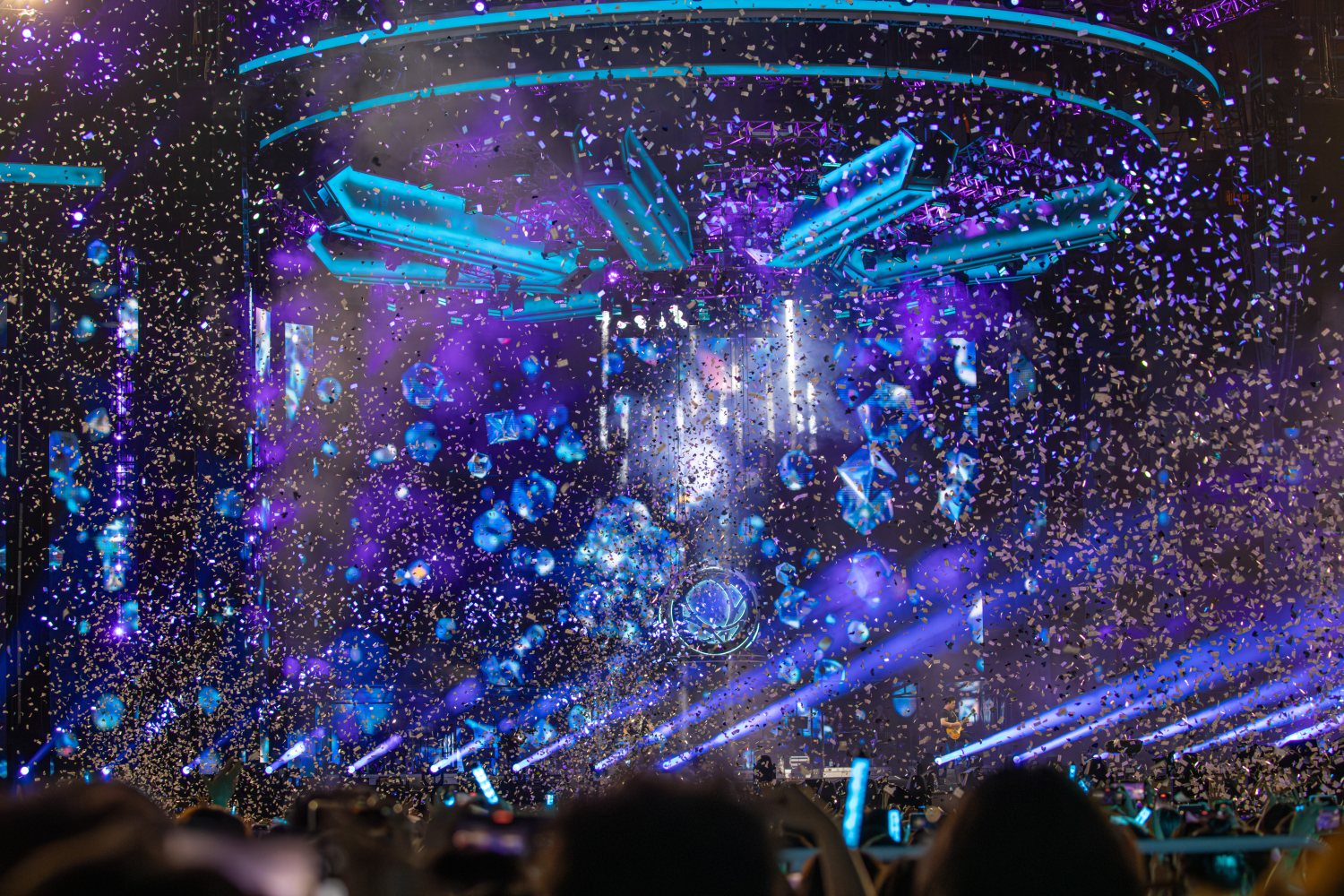
Extraterrestrial World Tour stage designs: Tower of Desire (top), Carousel (middle), and 0717 departing via his small spaceship (bottom)

The Extraterrestrial World Tour features a 130-meter stage and incorporates the use of a large spaceship above the stage is essential for the interstellar space theme. Before each concert, the production team uses 40 18-meter vans to load and transport parts then works continuously for 8 days using multiple cranes to lift the 30-ton spaceship to a height of 30 meters. Due to the time required for assembly and the weekly tour schedule, two sets of spaceship are used, alternating between tour stops. In addition, there are several other pieces that are central to storytelling, such as the 9-meter-high "Tower of Desire" in the first act, the "Carousel" in the third act that transport 0717 back in time, and the "Highwire Walking" (with harness) in the fourth act that symbolizes changes in 0717's emotional state before exiting in a space pod.

The stage is equipped with more than 2,000 lights, 28 sets of LED screens totaling 2,200 square meters, 21 sets of lifting platforms, and 250 computer numerical control motors. By integrating multi-tired lighting within the structure of the spaceship and flanking the movable LED screens with vertical lighting, it creates a dynamic setting for 0717's story. The lighting design has been recognized by LIT Lighting Design Awards, MUSE Design Awards and Novum Design Awards. The light sticks used by the audience are made of degradable and recyclable materials, in keeping with the theme of the story.

Outdoor stadiums venues, consisting of a large area that's split into floor and balcony sections, pose the challenge of how to provide high-quality experience for everyone. To overcome this, the "Extraterrestrial World Tour" sound design team installs a variety of L-Acoustics speakers around the stadium, including but not limited to K1, K2, Kara, K1-SB, and KS28. Since the Suzhou shows in 2021, the Extraterrestrial World Tour has utilized delay towers to reinforce the main sound system and ensure all audience members have the same sound quality in one of the earliest large-scale use of delay towers in China. The stage return system is made up of 22 L-Acoustics' 115XT HiQs, 4 ARCS IIs, and 4 KS28s while the PA console uses DiGiCo's Quantum 7.

== Critical reception ==
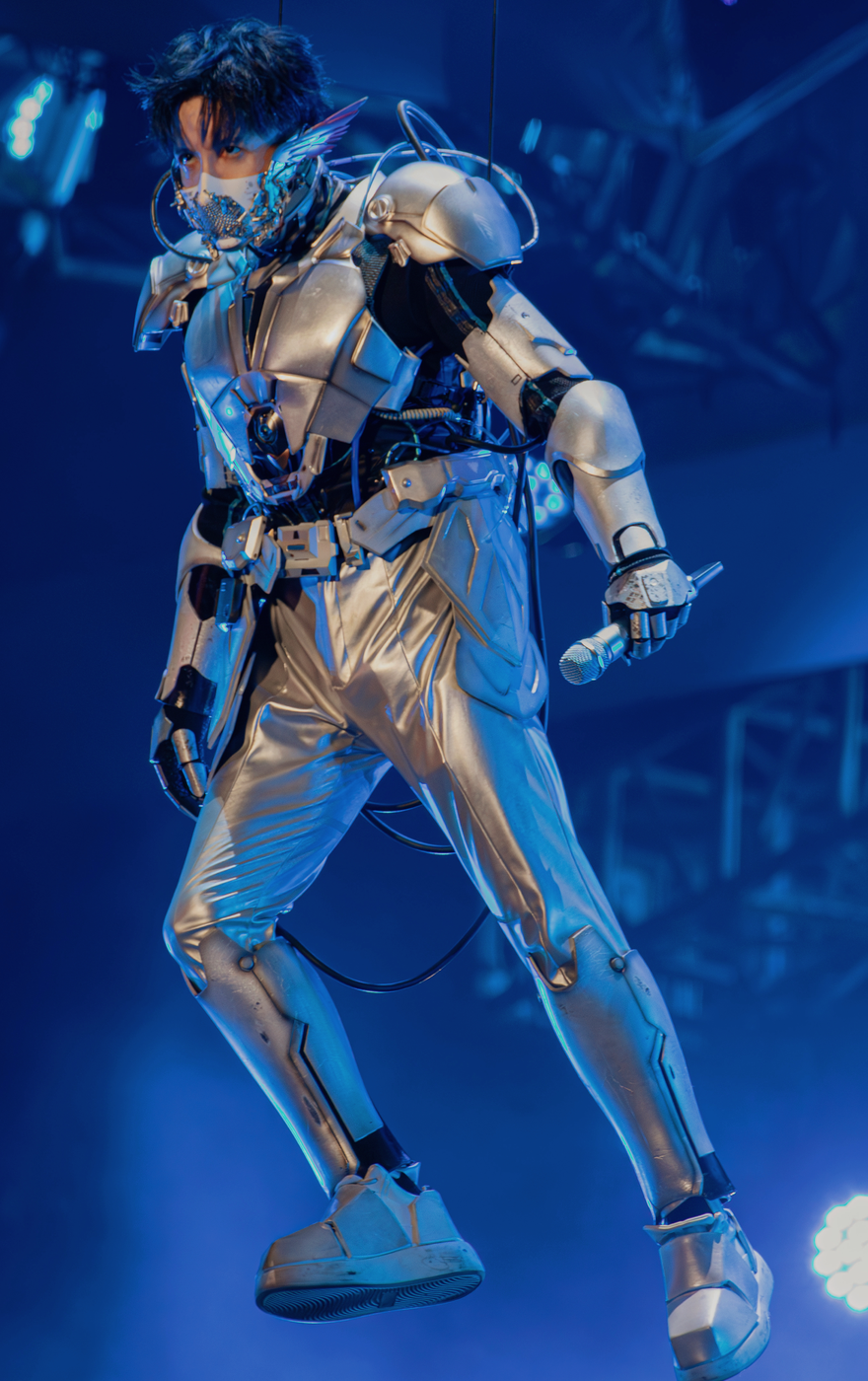
Xue portraying 0717 in the armor costume

The design for the Extraterrestrial Tour received praise for its immersive worldbuilding, offering the audience "visual and aural feast" and creating an enjoyable sci-fi music journey." The light design, in particular, has been recognized with three international awards.

Xue's tongue-in-cheek style was cited for the concert's success as the narrative was treated humorously with his distinctive deadpan and ironic style. The jokes and one-liners may, at first, "come across as distracting and jarring against the emotional register of his songs" but "for a performer as playful and wisecracking as Xue, one would expect chaos and off-the-wall eccentricity."

Xue’s performances were described as "spectacular, grand and true to the storyline." Xue's "voice rang with a pleading intensity perfect for the grand anthems he is known for", was "glam rock god [...] complete with some spirited head-banging" for certain tracks, and pulled off "robotic dance moves with his eight back-up dancers on high-octane songs."

Audience interaction was a highlight of Xue's concerts. At each stop, he incorporated local culture into his performance, via speaking to the audience in local dialect and updating the lyrics in "What Do You Want From Me." The popular "refund" running joke, where the audience cheerfully shouts for a "refund" anytime Xue says a wrong word or sings the wrong lyrics, had been made into compilations and shared widely online.

In December 2024, China Music Group released the 2024 Music Industry Report; in it, the Extraterrestrial World Tour was named among Top 10 Performances of the Year.

=== Awards ===
Awards and nominations for the Extraterrestrial World Tour
Year	Ceremony	Category	Result	Ref.
2022	Weibo Music Awards 微博音乐盛典	Most Recommended Concert Tour 年度推荐演唱会	Won	
2023	Chinese Music Awards 华语金曲奖	Best Performance Management of the Year 年度最佳演出管理	Nominated	
2023	LIT Lighting Design Awards	Concert Lighting Installation / Music Event Lighting	Won	
2023	MUSE Design Awards	Lighting Design: Entertainment Lighting	Platinum Winner	
2023	Novum Design Awards	Lighting Design	Gold	
2023	Weibo Music Awards 微博音乐盛典	Most Recommended Concert Tour 年度推荐演唱会	Won	
2024	Tencent Music Entertainment Awards 腾讯音乐娱乐盛典	Best Concert Tour of the Year 年度演唱会	Won	

== Commercial performance ==
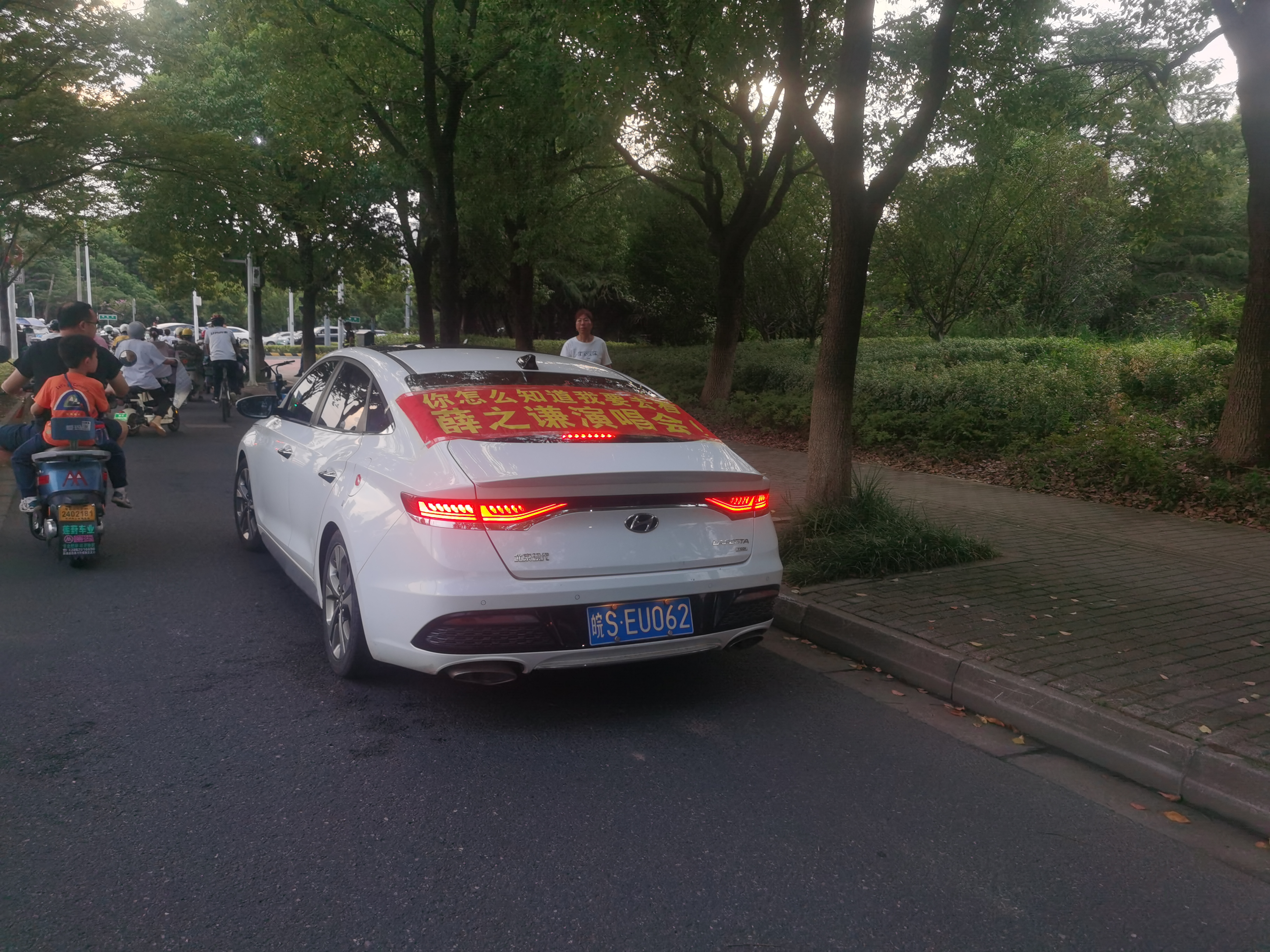
A vehicle drove towards the Suzhou Olympic Sports Centre, which the banner says "How did you know I am going to the concert by Joker Xue" at the rear (15 August 2024)

In 2021, Xue was first in comprehensive ranking of concert box office and number of shows of all 2021 tours in China. In 2023, Xue ranked first in artist with highest number of concerts and second in artist with most number of stops among all 2023 tours in China.

In June 2023, Hainan Airlines collaborated Chaoshi Music to create exclusive flights for the Extraterrestrial World Tour on a customized plane featuring the concert poster painted on the exterior and details such as lyrics from Xue's songs on the interior for an immersive experience. In July, the Extraterrestrial flights were named one of the "Top 50 Brand Marketing Cases" at the Top 100 Brands Awards Ceremony, hosted by Sina Finance and organized by China Brand Innovation Lab and Midu.

Many of the Chinese cities he toured in were categorized by Chinese city tier system as Tier 2 and Tier 3 cities, where he is often the first artist to hold a concert and in doing so, provides a significant boost to the local economy as concertgoers travel from all over the country to attend. Multiple cities reported the majority of attendees were non-local; with Chuzhou at 94%, Hengyang at 86%, and Wenzhou at 70%. In 2023, Xue's concerts in Quzhou, a third-tiered city, generated 124 million of cumulative tourism revenue, resulting in Quzhou ranking first in cities with the fastest box office growth in 2023. Demand for Xue's shows was so high that tens of thousands of concertgoers who were unable to get tickets often gathered outside of the stadiums and sang along with the music.

Xue's international stops were also successful. Both London and Paris shows were sold out. Kuala Lumpur and Singapore stops each had three consecutive shows due to overwhelming demand as originally only one show was announced then a second show was added when the first sold out quickly then a third show was added when the second also sold out quickly. On December 2, after the "Overseas Returned" Singapore National Stadium show sold out, a second show was added.

The total gross for the New York and Las Vegas shows was $5.8 million with the total attendance of 21,100, placing Xue at 23 on Billboard's February 2024 Top Tours list. Extraterrestrial Tour ranks number 85 on Pollstar's 2024 Mid-Year Top 100 Worldwide Tours with $10.3 million from five shows and number 83 on 2024 Mid-Year Top 100 North American Tours with $7.5 million from three shows; Xue is the only Chinese artist to appear on both charts. Qudos Bank Arena listed Xue among artists that attract "high-value audiences" and reported 72% increase in Net Promoter Scores, second highest in 2023, and 140% increase to other comparative acts, for Xue's show.

=== Consumer protection ===
On September 10, 2023, Xue was forced to cancel the second show of the Chengdu stop due to a high fever and tonsillitis. He announced the cancellation and refund policy in person because he felt it was only right to do so given the fact that concertgoers had already travelled to the venue. He then stayed for an impromptu mini meet-and-greet session for an hour. Not only were concertgoers offered a choice of ticket refund or exchange for a future show, but those from out of town could also be reimbursed for their travel and lodging expenses in full. This scale of comprehensive refund policy has never been done before and drew widespread praise. Tianjin Consumers Association voiced their approval of the decision, stating Xue's proactive reimbursement of travel and lodging expenses demonstrates "the social responsibility that public figures should have" and serves to "maintain a harmonious consumption environment." In the following year, other artists began providing similar refund policy, but with limits on travel and lodging reimbursement amounts, for concert cancellations.

On multiple occasions, Xue added extra shows to increase the likelihood that concertgoers can purchase tickets through official ticketing platforms, thereby decreasing the chances of ticket scalpers taking advantage. He also urged concertgoers to only attend one show per tour, striving to make the each show identical so they do not feel the fear of missing out if they only attended one show, and encouraged them to spend their time and money on enjoying other things in life.

=== Venue records ===
Venue records of the Extraterrestrial World Tour
Year	Period	Venue	Region	Description	Ref.
2023	March 18-19	Quzhou Stadium	China	First artist to perform at the venue. First artist to perform two consecutive shows at the venue. Highest number of consecutive shows (2) at the venue.	
2023	April 1	Guangxi Sports Center Stadium	China	First mainland China artist to perform at the venue.	
2023	April 21-22	Nanchang International Sport Center Stadium	China	First artist to perform two consecutive shows at the venue.	
2023	April 28-29	Nanjing Olympic Sports Centre Stadium	China	First artist to perform two consecutive shows at the venue.	
2023	May 13-14	Jinan Olympic Sports Center Stadium	China	First artist to perform two consecutive shows at the venue.	
2023	May 20-21	Zhengzhou Olympic Sports Center Stadium	China	First artist to perform two consecutive shows at the venue.	
2023	May 27	Lianyungang Sports Center Stadium	China	First mainland China artist to perform at the venue.	
2023	July 7-8	Qingdao Citizen Fitness Center Stadium	China	First artist to perform at the venue. First artist to perform two consecutive shows at the venue. Highest attendance (40,000) per concert. Fastest concert ticket sale record.	
2023	July 14–16	Hengyang Stadium	China	First artist to perform two consecutive shows at the venue. First artist to perform three consecutive shows at the venue.	
2023	August 5-6	Yichang Olympic Sports Center Stadium	China	First artist to perform two consecutive shows at the venue.	
2023	August 18-19	Lanzhou Olympic Sports Center Stadium	China	First artist to perform at the venue. First artist to perform two consecutive shows at the venue.	
2023	August 26-27	Zunyi Olympic Sports Center Stadium	China	First mainland China artist to perform at the venue. First mainland China artist to perform two consecutive shows at the venue.	
2023	September 9	Dong'an Lake Sports Park Stadium	China	First artist to perform at the venue.	
2023	November 11-12	Wenzhou Olympic Sports Center Stadium	China	First artist to perform at the venue. First artist to perform two consecutive shows at the venue.	
2023	December 16-17	Sanming Sports Stadium	China	First artist to perform at the venue. First artist to perform two consecutive shows at the venue.	
2024	May 10-12	Xiamen Egret Stadium	China	First artist to perform at the venue. First artist to perform two consecutive shows at the venue. First artist to perform three consecutive shows at the venue.	
2024	November 23	Bukit Jalil National Stadium	Malaysia	First mainland China artist to perform at the venue.	
2024	December 1	ENGIE Stadium	Australia	First mainland China artist to perform at the venue.	
2024	December 21	Thunderdome Stadium	Thailand	First mainland China artist to perform at the venue.	
2025	February 14 and 15	Singapore National Stadium	Singapore	First mainland China artist to perform at the venue. First mainland China artist to perform two consecutive shows at the venue.	

== Setlists ==
The setlist began with songs from Extraterrestrial and eventually expanded to include the majority of the songs from The Guardian.

Set list in mainland China

Xue updated the setlist with new releases throughout the tour, the setlist below notes changes to the setlist.

- Extraterrestrial (天外来物)
- The Return of the Prince (王子归来)
- Half a Beat Slower (慢半拍)
- Ugly (丑八怪)
- The Martian Has Come (火星人来过)
- Countless (无数) or Ambition (野心)
- Animal World (动物世界)
- Actor (演员)
- Adoration (崇拜)
- Medley (组曲串烧): Serious Snow (认真的雪), Deeply Loved You (深深爱过你), Ambiguous (暧昧), Yellow Maple Leaves (黄色枫叶), Gentleman (绅士), Just Right (刚刚好), Talent (天份), Freak (怪咖), Life After You Left Beijing (那是你离开北京的生活), The Mute (哑巴), Love Letter (情书), Radius Around You (方圆几里), Actually (其实), Half (一半), An Unexpected Journey (意外), Forsaken Youth (违背的青春), I Think I've Seen You Somewhere (我好像在哪见过你)
- Youth of Galaxy (银河少年) with Essay Wang or Express Our Feelings (聊表心意) with Liu Xijun
- Song by Essay Wang or Liu Xijun
- Mocking (笑场); replaced by Slowly (迟迟); replaced by Turn Waste Into Treasure (变废为宝); replaced by AI
- Accompany You to Wander (陪你去流浪)
- It's Been So Long (这么久没见)
- What Do You Want From Me (你还要我怎样)
- Like the Wind (像风一样)
- Conviction (念)
- Extraterrestrial (天外来物)
Set list in international regions (arenas)

Essay Wang and Liu Xijun do not appear at special guests at international arena shows. The setlist and talking segments are also reduced due to venue and time constraints.

- Extraterrestrial (天外来物)
- The Return of the Prince (王子归来)
- Actor (演员)
- The Martian Has Come (火星人来过)
- Animal World (动物世界)
- Ugly (丑八怪)
- Adoration (崇拜)
- Medley (组曲串烧): Serious Snow (认真的雪), Deeply Loved You (深深爱过你), Ambiguous (暧昧), Yellow Maple Leaves (黄色枫叶), Gentleman (绅士), Just Right (刚刚好), Talent (天份), Freak (怪咖), Life After You Left Beijing (那是你离开北京的生活), Radius Around You (方圆几里), Actually (其实), Half (一半), An Unexpected Journey (意外), Forsaken Youth (违背的青春), I Think I've Seen You Somewhere (我好像在哪见过你)
- What Do You Want From Me (你还要我怎样)
- Ambition (野心)
- Accompany You to Wander (陪你去流浪)
- It's Been So Long (这么久没见)
- Like the Wind (像风一样)
- Conviction (念)
- Extraterrestrial (天外来物)
Set list in international regions (stadiums)

The international stadium shows feature the full setlist from mainland China shows with two new songs added to the setlist: Nothing and Rent Purchase.

- Extraterrestrial (天外来物)
- The Return of the Prince (王子归来)
- Half a Beat Slower (慢半拍)
- Ugly (丑八怪)
- The Martian Has Come (火星人来过)
- Countless (无数)
- Animal World (动物世界)
- Actor (演员)
- Rent Purchase (租购)
- Adoration (崇拜)
- Medley (组曲串烧): Serious Snow (认真的雪), Deeply Loved You (深深爱过你), Ambiguous (暧昧), Yellow Maple Leaves (黄色枫叶), Gentleman (绅士), Just Right (刚刚好), What Do You Want From Me (你还要我怎样), Talent (天份), Freak (怪咖), Life After You Left Beijing (那是你离开北京的生活), Love Letter（情书), Radius Around You (方圆几里), Actually (其实), Half (一半), An Unexpected Journey (意外), Forsaken Youth (违背的青春), DJ Remix of I Think I've Seen You Somewhere (我好像在哪见过你) + Ugly (丑八怪) + Just Right (刚刚好)
- Nothing
- Stay Here
- Accompany You to Wander (陪你去流浪)
- It's Been So Long (这么久没见)
- Relieve Boredom (解解闷)
- Like the Wind (像风一样)
- The Guardian (守村人)
- Conviction (念)
- Extraterrestrial (天外来物)

=== Songs of note ===
Xue familiarizes himself with local dialect, customs, and/or landmarks at each stop and incorporates them into certain songs that have become highlights that attendees look forward to.

- "The Return of the Prince" (王子归来) – Last line changed at each stop to ask "Are you at...?" as a greeting or to comment on local weather
- "What Do You Want From Me" (你还要我怎样) – Verse updated at each stop to reflect local customs/landmarks

For the 99th and 100th concert in Luoyang of the Extraterrestrial World Tour, Xue invited Peking Opera performer Zhang Zixi for a limited special performance of "City of Luo" (洛城). Xue said at the concert that only this city has this song.

== Special guests ==
Xue has two regular special guests on this tour: Essay Wang and Liu Xijun. The setlist changes based on who is present; Xue performs "Youth of Galaxy" (银河少年) with Wang and "Express Our Feelings" (聊表心意) with Liu.

At Hongkou Football Stadium, Xue invited JunJun as his special guest for the June 21, 2023 show.

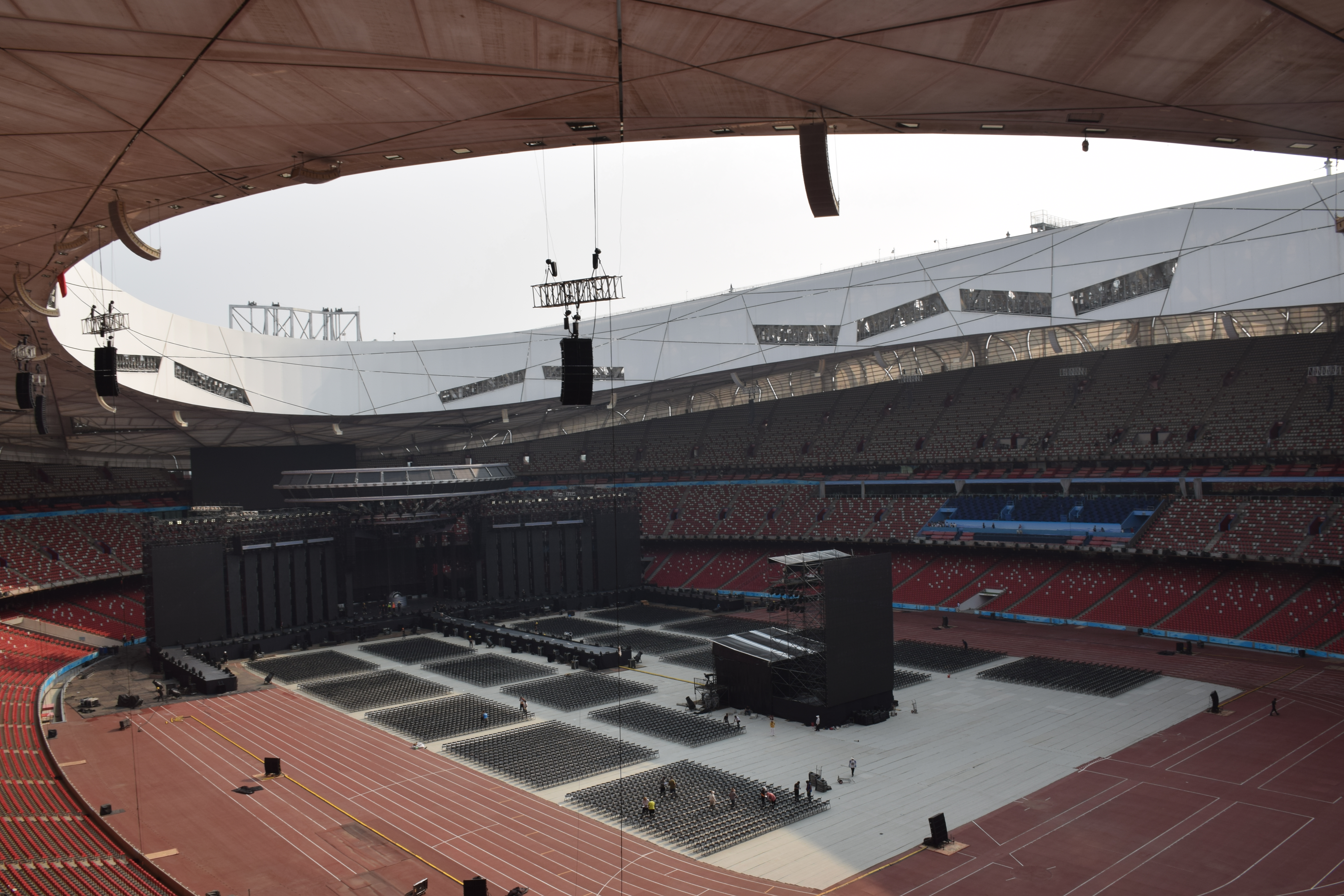
Photo of the Beijing National Stadium setting up for Xue's concerts in July 2024

For shows at the Beijing National Stadium, Xue invited the following special guests:

- August 11, 2023: G.E.M.
- August 12, 2023: Xu Song
- August 13, 2023: Jane Zhang
- July 12, 2024: William Chan
- July 13, 2024: Yue Yunpeng
- July 14, 2024: Li Jian
- July 17, 2024: Da Peng
- July 19, 2024: Roy Wang
- July 20, 2024: Han Hong

== Tour dates ==
List of tour dates
Date	City	Country	Venue
October 23, 2021	Suzhou	China	Suzhou Sports Center
October 24, 2021	Suzhou	China	Suzhou Sports Center
November 27, 2021	Guangzhou	China	Guangzhou University Town Stadium
November 28, 2021	Guangzhou	China	Guangzhou University Town Stadium
December 24, 2022	Haikou	China	Wuyuan River Stadium
March 18, 2023	Quzhou	China	Quzhou Stadium
March 19, 2023	Quzhou	China	Quzhou Stadium
April 1, 2023	Nanning	China	Guangxi Sports Center Stadium
April 14, 2023	Foshan	China	Century Lotus Stadium
April 15, 2023	Foshan	China	Century Lotus Stadium
April 21, 2023	Nanchang	China	Nanchang International Sport Center Stadium
April 22, 2023	Nanchang	China	Nanchang International Sport Center Stadium
April 28, 2023	Nanjing	China	Nanjing Olympic Sports Centre Stadium
April 29, 2023	Nanjing	China	Nanjing Olympic Sports Centre Stadium
May 13, 2023	Jinan	China	Jinan Olympic Sports Center Stadium
May 14, 2023	Jinan	China	Jinan Olympic Sports Center Stadium
May 20, 2023	Zhengzhou	China	Zhengzhou Olympic Sports Center Stadium
May 21, 2023	Zhengzhou	China	Zhengzhou Olympic Sports Center Stadium
May 27, 2023	Lianyungang	China	Lianyungang Sports Center Stadium
June 3, 2023	Wuhan	China	Wuhan Sports Center
June 4, 2023	Wuhan	China	Wuhan Sports Center
June 10, 2023	Harbin	China	HICEC Stadium
June 21, 2023	Shanghai	China	Hongkou Football Stadium
June 22, 2023	Shanghai	China	Hongkou Football Stadium
June 23, 2023	Shanghai	China	Hongkou Football Stadium
July 1, 2023	Xi'an	China	Xi'an Olympic Sports Center
July 2, 2023	Xi'an	China	Xi'an Olympic Sports Center
July 8, 2023	Qingdao	China	Qingdao Citizen Fitness Center Stadium
July 9, 2023	Qingdao	China	Qingdao Citizen Fitness Center Stadium
July 14, 2023	Hengyang	China	Hengyang Stadium
July 15, 2023	Hengyang	China	Hengyang Stadium
July 16, 2023	Hengyang	China	Hengyang Stadium
July 21, 2023	Hefei	China	Hefei Olympic Sports Center Stadium
July 22, 2023	Hefei	China	Hefei Olympic Sports Center Stadium
July 23, 2023	Hefei	China	Hefei Olympic Sports Center Stadium
July 28, 2023	Shenzhen	China	Shenzhen Universiade Sports Centre
July 29, 2023	Shenzhen	China	Shenzhen Universiade Sports Centre
August 5, 2023	Yichang	China	Yichang Olympic Sports Center Stadium
August 6, 2023	Yichang	China	Yichang Olympic Sports Center Stadium
August 11, 2023	Beijing	China	Beijing National Stadium
August 12, 2023	Beijing	China	Beijing National Stadium
August 13, 2023	Beijing	China	Beijing National Stadium
August 18, 2023	Lanzhou	China	Lanzhou Olympic Sports Center Stadium
August 19, 2023	Lanzhou	China	Lanzhou Olympic Sports Center Stadium
August 26, 2023	Zunyi	China	Zunyi Olympic Sports Center Stadium
August 27, 2023	Zunyi	China	Zunyi Olympic Sports Center Stadium
September 2, 2023	Shenyang	China	Shenyang Olympic Sports Center Stadium
September 3, 2023	Shenyang	China	Shenyang Olympic Sports Center Stadium
September 9, 2023	Chengdu	China	Dong'an Lake Sports Park Stadium
September 16, 2023	Fuzhou	China	Haixia Olympic Center
September 17, 2023	Fuzhou	China	Haixia Olympic Center
September 22, 2023	Guangzhou	China	Tianhe Stadium
September 23, 2023	Guangzhou	China	Tianhe Stadium
September 24, 2023	Guangzhou	China	Tianhe Stadium
September 29, 2023	Chuzhou	China	Chuzhou Olympic Sports Center Stadium
September 30, 2023	Chuzhou	China	Chuzhou Olympic Sports Center Stadium
October 5, 2023	Shijiazhuang	China	Hebei Olympic Sports Center
October 6, 2023	Shijiazhuang	China	Hebei Olympic Sports Center
October 14, 2023	Tianjin	China	Tianjin Olympic Center
October 15, 2023	Tianjin	China	Tianjin Olympic Center
October 20, 2023	Changzhou	China	Changzhou Olympic Sports Centre
October 21, 2023	Changzhou	China	Changzhou Olympic Sports Centre
October 27, 2023	Qingyuan	China	Qingyuan Sports Center Stadium
October 28, 2023	Qingyuan	China	Qingyuan Sports Center Stadium
November 3, 2023	Chengdu	China	Dong'an Lake Sports Park Stadium
November 4, 2023 (Note: Originally scheduled for September 10, but was cancelled due to tonsillitis. Xue appeared in person to apologize to the audience, promised to return at a later date, and offered ticket refund or exchange as well as travel expense reimbursement.)	Chengdu	China	Dong'an Lake Sports Park Stadium
November 11, 2023	Wenzhou	China	Wenzhou Olympic Sports Center Stadium
November 12, 2023	Wenzhou	China	Wenzhou Olympic Sports Center Stadium
November 19, 2023	London	England	OVO Wembley Arena
November 22, 2023	Paris	France	Zénith Paris
December 2, 2023	Hong Kong	China	AsiaWorld–Arena
December 3, 2023	Hong Kong	China	AsiaWorld–Arena
December 8, 2023	Macau	China	Galaxy Arena
December 9, 2023	Macau	China	Galaxy Arena
December 10, 2023	Macau	China	Galaxy Arena
December 16, 2023	Sanming	China	Sanming Sports Stadium
December 17, 2023	Sanming	China	Sanming Sports Stadium
December 23, 2023	Kuala Lumpur	Malaysia	Axiata Arena
December 24, 2023	Kuala Lumpur	Malaysia	Axiata Arena
December 25, 2023	Kuala Lumpur	Malaysia	Axiata Arena
January 5, 2024	Singapore		Singapore Indoor Stadium
January 6, 2024	Singapore		Singapore Indoor Stadium
January 7, 2024	Singapore		Singapore Indoor Stadium
January 13, 2024	Qujing	China	Qujing Culture Sports Park
January 14, 2024	Qujing	China	Qujing Culture Sports Park
January 27, 2024	Haikou	China	Wuyuan River Stadium
February 17, 2024	New York City	United States	Barclays Center
February 24, 2024	Las Vegas	United States	MGM Grand Garden Arena
March 4, 2024	San Jose	United States	SAP Center
March 7, 2024	Vancouver	Canada	Rogers Arena
March 13, 2024	Toronto	Canada	Coca-Cola Coliseum
March 23, 2024	Sydney	Australia	Sydney SuperDome
March 26, 2024	Melbourne	Australia	Rod Laver Arena
March 30, 2024	Auckland	New Zealand	Spark Arena
April 6, 2024	Hangzhou	China	Hangzhou Olympic Sports Expo Center
April 7, 2024	Hangzhou	China	Hangzhou Olympic Sports Expo Center
April 13, 2024	Chongqing	China	Chongqing Olympic Sports Center
April 14, 2024	Chongqing	China	Chongqing Olympic Sports Center
April 20, 2024	Luoyang	China	Luoyang Olympic Center Stadium
April 21, 2024	Luoyang	China	Luoyang Olympic Center Stadium
April 26, 2024	Zhenjiang	China	Zhenjiang Sports and Exhibition Center
April 27, 2024	Zhenjiang	China	Zhenjiang Sports and Exhibition Center
May 4, 2024	Taiyuan	China	Shanxi Sports Centre Stadium
May 5, 2024	Taiyuan	China	Shanxi Sports Centre Stadium
May 10, 2024	Xiamen	China	Xiamen Egret Stadium
May 11, 2024	Xiamen	China	Xiamen Egret Stadium
May 12, 2024	Xiamen	China	Xiamen Egret Stadium
May 18, 2024	Ürümqi	China	Urumqi Olympic Sports Center Stadium
May 19, 2024	Ürümqi	China	Urumqi Olympic Sports Center Stadium
May 25, 2024	Dalian	China	Dalian Sports Centre Stadium
May 26, 2024	Dalian	China	Dalian Sports Centre Stadium
June 1, 2024	Xining	China	Qinghai Sports Center Stadium
June 14, 2024	Changsha	China	Helong Sports Center Stadium
June 15, 2024	Changsha	China	Helong Sports Center Stadium
June 16, 2024	Changsha	China	Helong Sports Center Stadium
June 21, 2024	Xuzhou	China	Xuzhou Olympic Sports Centre Stadium
June 22, 2024	Xuzhou	China	Xuzhou Olympic Sports Centre Stadium
June 23, 2024	Xuzhou	China	Xuzhou Olympic Sports Centre Stadium
June 29, 2024	Shantou	China	Shantou Sports Centre Stadium
June 30, 2024	Shantou	China	Shantou Sports Centre Stadium
July 5, 2024	Hohhot	China	Hohhot City Stadium
July 6, 2024	Hohhot	China	Hohhot City Stadium
July 12, 2024	Beijing	China	Beijing National Stadium
July 13, 2024	Beijing	China	Beijing National Stadium
July 14, 2024	Beijing	China	Beijing National Stadium
July 17, 2024	Beijing	China	Beijing National Stadium
July 19, 2024	Beijing	China	Beijing National Stadium
July 20, 2024	Beijing	China	Beijing National Stadium
July 25, 2024	Shenzhen	China	Shenzhen Universiade Sports Centre
July 26, 2024	Shenzhen	China	Shenzhen Universiade Sports Centre
July 28, 2024	Shenzhen	China	Shenzhen Universiade Sports Centre
August 2, 2024	Shenzhen	China	Shenzhen Universiade Sports Centre
August 3, 2024	Shenzhen	China	Shenzhen Universiade Sports Centre
August 4, 2024	Shenzhen	China	Shenzhen Universiade Sports Centre
August 9, 2024	Suzhou	China	Suzhou Olympic Sports Centre
August 10, 2024	Suzhou	China	Suzhou Olympic Sports Centre
August 11, 2024	Suzhou	China	Suzhou Olympic Sports Centre
August 15, 2024	Suzhou	China	Suzhou Olympic Sports Centre
August 16, 2024	Suzhou	China	Suzhou Olympic Sports Centre
August 18, 2024	Suzhou	China	Suzhou Olympic Sports Centre
November 23, 2024	Kuala Lumpur	Malaysia	Bukit Jalil National Stadium
December 1, 2024	Sydney	Australia	ENGIE Stadium
December 21, 2024 (Note: Originally scheduled for December 29, 2023 at Impact Arena, but was cancelled due to safety concerns. The rescheduled show featured new setlist, stage design, and bigger venue.)	Bangkok	Thailand	Thunderdome Stadium
February 14, 2025	Singapore		Singapore National Stadium
February 15, 2025	Singapore		Singapore National Stadium

== Personnel ==
Information below is based on concerts held in mainland China and may vary per stop based on scheduling and availability.

- Producer – Chaoshi Music
- Organizer – Different at each stop, usually local companies
- Production Unit – Beijing Showin
- Music Director – Liu Zhuo
- Monitor – Zhang Xiaonian
- PA – Zhang Junjun
- Dance Team – SDT Show Pro
- Hair stylist – Chen Chen
- Makeup artist – Minglang
- Local police, fire, culture and tourism, transportation, and other governmental departments

== Footnotes ==
Rescheduled shows
