= Wang Lisan =

Chinese composer

Wang Lisan (Chinese: 汪立三; pinyin: Wāng Lìsān; 24 March 1933 – 6 July 2013) was a Chinese composer and music educator, born in Wuhan, Hubei. He previously held the positions of Executive Director of the Chinese Musicians' Association and head of the Department of Arts at Harbin Normal University. His well-known works include The Other Mountains (5 Preludes and Fugues) (Chinese: 《他山集（序曲与赋格五首）》) and Sonatina (Chinese: 《小奏鸣曲》).
