= Billboard Radio China Top 10 Chart =

The Billboard Radio China Top 10 Chart, also known as the Top 10 Hero Chart, was a record chart that measured the airplay of Mandarin and Cantonese songs. Chart ranking is based on the mainstream radio charts in Chinese-speaking regions as well as online streaming and digital sales. Sources include Taiwan's KKBox, mainland China's Kugou and QQ Music, Weibo's Asia New Songs Chart, and YinYueTai's V Chart.

On October 3, 2016, Billboard Radio China rebranded their weekly top 10 Mandarin and top 10 Cantonese singles charts as the Top 10 Hero chart. The Top 10 Hero charts are released as short videos with a special guest each episode.

== List of number one songs ==
=== 2015 ===
Date	Mandarin		Ref.
Date	Song	Artist	Ref.
December 16	"Please Contact Me" (请跟我联络)	Li Yifeng	
December 23	"Twilight" (不为谁而作的歌)	JJ Lin	
December 30	"Twilight" (不为谁而作的歌)	JJ Lin	

=== 2016 ===
Date	Mandarin		Cantonese		Ref.
Date	Song	Artist	Song	Artist	Ref.
January 6	"Twilight" (不为谁而作的歌)	JJ Lin			
January 13	"Twilight" (不为谁而作的歌)	JJ Lin			
February 28	"Full House" (满座)	Li Ronghao			
March 3	"Full House" (满座)	Li Ronghao			
March 10	"Full House" (满座)	Li Ronghao			
March 17	"Full House" (满座)	Li Ronghao			
May 12	"Towards the Light"	Timmy Xu			
May 29	"Chain of Love" (鍊愛)	Jess Lee			
June 5	"Chain of Love" (鍊愛)	Jess Lee			
June 12	"Presence" (存在感)	Li Yuchun			
June 21	"Beginner" (初学者)	Joker Xue			
June 26	"Beginner" (初学者)	Joker Xue			
July 3	"Beginner" (初学者)	Joker Xue			
July 10	"Beginner" (初学者)	Joker Xue			
July 17	"Party Animal" (派對動物)	Mayday			
July 24	"When You Are Gone" (余波荡漾)	Hebe Tien			
July 31	"Ferris Wheel" (摩天輪的思念)	Karry Wang			
August 7	"Us and Them" (后来的我们)	Mayday			
August 21	"Us and Them" (后来的我们)	Mayday			
August 28	"Us and Them" (后来的我们)	Mayday			
September 4	"How Have You Been" (你好不好)	Eric Chou			
September 18	"Irreplaceable" (永远都在)	S.H.E			
September 25	"There Is Ample Time" (来日方长)	Joker Xue & Isabelle Huang			
October 3	"Annual Ring Says" (年輪說)	Rainie Yang	"After These Autumns and Winters" (经过一些秋与冬)	Dear Jane	
October 10	"You Waited for Me at the End" (你在终点等我)	Faye Wong	"After These Autumns and Winters" (经过一些秋与冬)	Dear Jane	
October 17	"Who in the World Will Listen to You" (全世界谁倾听你)	Yoga Lin	"Four Seasons" (四季)	Eason Chan	
October 24	"Who in the World Will Listen to You" (全世界谁倾听你)	Yoga Lin	"Four Seasons" (四季)	Eason Chan	
October 31	"Who in the World Will Listen to You" (全世界谁倾听你)	Yoga Lin	"Same One" (同一)	Supper Moment	
November 7	"Catch Me When I Fall" (某時某刻)	Lu Han	"One of a Kind" (獨一無二)	AGA & Gin Lee	
November 14	"Ego-Holic" (戀我癖)	Starr Chen feat. Jolin Tsai	"One of a Kind" (獨一無二)	AGA & Gin Lee	
November 21	"Love Confession" (告白氣球)	Jay Chou	"I Am Nothing Without You" (沒有你我什麼都不是)	Jason Chan	
November 28	"July"	Kris Wu	"I Am Nothing Without You" (沒有你我什麼都不是)	Jason Chan	
December 5	"Love Confession" (告白氣球)	Jay Chou	"I Am Nothing Without You" (沒有你我什麼都不是)	Jason Chan	
December 12	"Song About You" (好好 (想把你寫成一首歌))	Mayday	"Short Story" (小故事)	JW	
December 19	"Love Confession" (告白氣球)	Jay Chou	"Short Story" (小故事)	JW	
December 26	"Love Confession" (告白氣球)	Jay Chou	"I Am Nothing Without You" (沒有你我什麼都不是)	Jason Chan	

=== 2017 ===
Date	Mandarin		Cantonese		Ref.
Date	Song	Artist	Song	Artist	Ref.
January 2	"Love Confession" (告白氣球)	Jay Chou	"Love Takes Courage" (愛需要勇氣)	Stephanie Ho	
January 9	"Love Confession" (告白氣球)	Jay Chou	"Love Takes Courage" (愛需要勇氣)	Stephanie Ho	
January 16	"Love Confession" (告白氣球)	Jay Chou	"Four Seasons" (四季)	Eason Chan	
January 22	"Love Confession" (告白氣球)	Jay Chou	"Four Seasons" (四季)	Eason Chan	
January 30	"Light Years Away" (光年之外)	G.E.M.	"Wounded" (验伤)	Janice Vidal	
February 13	"Light Years Away" (光年之外)	G.E.M.	"Once in a Lifetime" (難得一遇)	Phil Lam	
February 20	"Love Confession" (告白氣球)	Jay Chou	"Once in a Lifetime" (難得一遇)	Phil Lam	
February 27	"Blossoms" (繁花)	Dong Zhen	"Once in a Lifetime" (難得一遇)	Phil Lam	
March 6	"Longing For" (思慕)	Yisa Yu	"Once in a Lifetime" (難得一遇)	Phil Lam	
March 13	"Longing For" (思慕)	Yisa Yu	"A Moment of Love" (一刻恋上)	C Allstar	
March 20	"The Heroes"	Timmy Xu	"Once in a Lifetime" (難得一遇)	Phil Lam	
March 27	"The Heroes"	Timmy Xu	"Once in a Lifetime" (難得一遇)	Phil Lam	
April 3	"Love Without Fear" (我就是愛你不害怕)	Sammi Cheng	"1+1=14"	Tat Ming Pair	
April 10	"Between the Vines" (藤蔓之间)	Vision Wei	"Enemy" (天敌)	Janice Vidal	
April 17	"Proud Teenager" (骄傲的少年)	Karry Wang, Liu Haoran, Darren Wang, Zhang Yishan, Dong Zijian	"Closer" (近在千里)	Pakho Chau (feat. Janice Vidal)	
April 24	"Ambiguous" (暧昧)	Joker Xue	"Closer" (近在千里)	Pakho Chau (feat. Janice Vidal)	
May 1	"On Call" (時差)	Lu Han	"3AM"	AGA	
May 8	"The Lament" (离骚)	Jackson Yee	"Said Goodbye" (说再见了吧)	Supper Moment	
May 15	"The Lament" (离骚)	Jackson Yee	"Said Goodbye" (说再见了吧)	Supper Moment	
May 22	"The Lament" (离骚)	Jackson Yee	"3AM"	AGA	
May 29	"The Lament" (离骚)	Jackson Yee	"3AM"	AGA	
June 5	"En" (嗯)	Li Ronghao	"3AM"	AGA	
June 12	"Peach Blossom Promise" (桃花诺)	G.E.M.	"3AM"	AGA	
June 19	"Animal World" (动物世界)	Joker Xue	"Airline Stewardess" (空姐)	Gin Lee	
June 25	"Equal to Heaven" (齐天)	Hua Chenyu	"The Walking Dead" (行尸走肉)	Jason Chan	
July 2	"Equal to Heaven" (齐天)	Hua Chenyu	"The Walking Dead" (行尸走肉)	Jason Chan	
July 10	"Peach Blossom Promise" (桃花诺)	G.E.M.	"Small Steps" (小碎步)	Sherman Chung	
July 17	"That Is It" (就这样)	Li Ronghao	"Root" (根)	Alfred Hui	
July 24	"Sunshine Will Never Fade Away" (阳光不锈)	Roy Wang	"Mixology" (两沟)	Tang Siu Hau	
July 31	"Sunshine Will Never Fade Away" (阳光不锈)	Roy Wang	"Missed Appointment" (失约)	Twins	
August 7	"Come On Amigo" (加油 Amigo)	TFBoys	"Powerful Love Song" (霸气情歌)	Jason Chan	
August 14	"He-R" (魚仔)	Crowd Lu	"Sense of Security" (安全感)	JW	
August 21	"Coming Home"	Will Pan	"Sense of Security" (安全感)	JW	
August 28	"Our Times" (我们的时光)	TFBoys	"Sense of Security" (安全感)	JW	
September 4	"Our Times" (我们的时光)	TFBoys	"It's Good to Have Tears" (有泪多好)	Phil Lam	
September 11	"Numb" (啞巴)	Will Pan	"It's Good to Have Tears" (有泪多好)	Phil Lam	
September 18	"Numb" (啞巴)	Will Pan	"Sense of Security" (安全感)	JW	
September 25	"Chasing Dreams with A Pure Heart" (追梦赤子心)	Lu Han	"Brick" (磚頭)	Jason Chan	
October 9	"Like a Dream" (心率)	Lu Han	"Sky Net" (天网)	Pakho Chau	
October 16	"Sheep"	Lay Zhang	"Upside Down"	Justin Lo	
October 23	"Sheep"	Lay Zhang	"Earlier Recording" (較早前錄影)	Deep Ng	
October 30	"Sheep"	Lay Zhang	"Earlier Recording" (較早前錄影)	Deep Ng	
November 6	"Loneliness of the Carousel" (回轉木馬的孤單)	Stephy Qi	"Earlier Recording" (較早前錄影)	Deep Ng	
November 13	"Happy Ever After" (今天雨 可是我们在一起)	Li Yuchun	"Good Man" (大丈夫)	Supper Moment	
November 20	"Popularity" (流行)	Li Yuchun	"Good Man" (大丈夫)	Supper Moment	
November 27	"Pride" (骄傲)	Roy Wang	"Forgot Myself" (忘記我自己)	Hana	
December 4	"Camel" (骆驼)	Joker Xue	"Night Without You"	AGA	
December 11	"Quit Smoking" (戒烟)	Li Ronghao	"If the World Is Not What You Expected" (假使世界原來不像你預期)	Charmaine Fong	
December 18	"B.M."	Kris Wu	"Blink of An Eye" (一晃眼)	Janice Vidal	
December 25	"Little Big Us" (偉大的渺小)	JJ Lin	"Burn After Reading" (閲後即焚)	Jason Chan	

=== 2018 ===
Date	Mandarin		Cantonese		Ref.
Date	Song	Artist	Song	Artist	Ref.
January 8	"Fox" (狐狸)	Joker Xue	"Burn After Reading" (閲後即焚)	Jason Chan	
January 15	"Left Behind" (身後)	A-Mei	"Grasslands" (草原)	Phil Lam	
January 22	"Be Apart" (說散就散)	Tia Ray	"If the World Is Not What You Expected" (假使世界原來不像你預期)	Charmaine Fong	
January 29	"Waiting For You" (等你下課)	Jay Chou & Gary Yang	"Original Intention" (初心)	Leo Ku	
February 4	"Waiting For You" (等你下課)	Jay Chou & Gary Yang			
February 11	"Waiting For You" (等你下課)	Jay Chou & Gary Yang	"Far Off" (無期)	AGA	
February 25	"Waiting For You" (等你下課)	Jay Chou & Gary Yang	"Very Strong" (很堅強)	Gin Lee	
March 4	"Decency" (体面)	Kelly Yu	"Far Off" (無期)	AGA	
March 11	"Cantabile" (如歌)	Jason Zhang	"Far Off" (無期)	AGA	
March 18	"Decency" (体面)	Kelly Yu			
March 25	"Waiting For You" (等你下課)	Jay Chou & Gary Yang	"Far Off" (無期)	AGA	
April 1	Growing Fond of You (慢慢喜歡你)	Karen Mok	"Far Off" (無期)	AGA	
April 8	"A Friend I Have Loved for a Long Time" (愛了很久的朋友)	Hebe Tien	"Far Off" (無期)	AGA	
April 16	"A Friend I Have Loved for a Long Time" (愛了很久的朋友)	Hebe Tien	"Far Off" (無期)	AGA	
April 23	"Decency" (体面)	Kelly Yu	"Far Off" (無期)	AGA	
April 30	"Us" (我们)	Eason Chan	"Scraps" (残渣)	Mischa Ip	
May 7	"Skyscrapers" (摩天大樓)	Joker Xue	"Orange Ocean" (橙海)	Supper Moment	
May 13	"A Friend I Have Loved for a Long Time" (愛了很久的朋友)	Hebe Tien	"Prodigy 1985" (天才兒童1985)	Hins Cheung	
June 3	"If You Don't Love Me, It's Fine" (不爱我就拉倒)	Jay Chou			
June 24	"If You Don't Love Me, It's Fine" (不爱我就拉倒)	Jay Chou			
July 8	"Wait A Minute"	Next			
July 15	"Freak" (怪咖)	Joker Xue			
July 22	"Learn to Meow" (学猫叫)	Xiaopanpan & Xiaofengfeng			
July 29	"Trap" (陷阱)	Wang Beiche			
August 5	"Calorie" (卡路里)	Rocket Girls 101			
August 12	"Pull Up"	Cai Xukun			
August 26	"I Like You" (喜歡你)	TFBoys			
September 2	"Tik Tok" (倒数)	G.E.M.			
September 9	"Tik Tok" (倒数)	G.E.M.			
September 16	"Seventeen" (十七)	S.H.E			
September 23	"Seventeen" (十七)	S.H.E			
September 30	"The Moment" (時間停了)	Lu Han			
October 7	"The Moment" (時間停了)	Lu Han			
October 14	"If I Were Young" (年少有为)	Li Ronghao			
October 21	"Ear" (耳朵)	Li Ronghao			
October 28	"If I Were Young" (年少有为)	Li Ronghao			
November 4	"Namanana" (夢不落雨林)	Lay Zhang			

== Year-end charts ==
=== 2016 ===
Rank	Mandarin		Cantonese		Ref.
Rank	Song	Artist	Song	Artist	Ref.
1	"Full House" (满座)	Li Ronghao	"A Life of Contradictions" (矛盾一生)	JW	
2	"Twilight" (不为谁而作的歌)	JJ Lin	"Fly Freely" (自由飛翔)	JW	
3	"Beginner" (初学者)	Joker Xue	"Double" (雙雙)	Gin Lee	
4	"How Have You Been" (你好不好)	Eric Chou	"How Many Years" (多少年)	JW	
5	"Us and Them" (后来的我们)	Mayday	"I Am Nothing Without You" (沒有你我什麼都不是)	Jason Chan	
6	"Love Confession" (告白氣球)	Jay Chou	"Goddess" (女神)	Joyce Cheng	
7	"Be My Own Friend" (当我的好朋友)	Ding Dang	"Man Under the Moon" (月球下的人)	Gin Lee	
8	"Make It Big"	Jane Zhang	"After These Autumns and Winters" (经过一些秋与冬)	Dear Jane	
9	"Chain of Love" (鍊愛)	Jess Lee	"A Pair of Hands" (一雙手)	Phil Lam	
10	"Paektu Mountain" (长白山)	Essay Wang	"People" (百姓)	James Ng	

=== 2017 ===
Rank	Mandarin		Cantonese		Ref.
Rank	Song	Artist	Song	Artist	Ref.
1	"The Lament" (离骚)	Jackson Yee	"Once in a Lifetime" (難得一遇)	Phil Lam	
2	"Sheep"	Lay Zhang	3AM	AGA	
3	"Our Times" (我们的时光)	TFBoys	"Sense of Security" (安全感)	JW	
4	"Light Years Away" (光年之外)	G.E.M.	"Earlier Recording" (較早前錄影)	Deep Ng	
5	"Longing For" (思慕)	Yisa Yu	"Said Goodbye" (说再见了吧)	Supper Moment	
6	"The Heroes"	Timmy Xu	"Good Man" (大丈夫)	Supper Moment	
7	"Equal to Heaven" (齐天)	Hua Chenyu	"Brick" (磚頭)	Jason Chan	
8	"Sunshine Will Never Fade Away" (阳光不锈)	Roy Wang	"The Walking Dead" (行尸走肉)	Jason Chan	
9	"Numb" (啞巴)	Will Pan	"It's Good to Have Tears" (有泪多好)	Phil Lam	
10	"Chasing Dreams with a Pure Heart" (追梦赤子心)	Lu Han	"Forgot Myself" (忘記我自己)	Hana	

=== 2018 ===
Rank	Mandarin		Cantonese		Ref.
Rank	Song	Artist	Song	Artist	Ref.
1	"Waiting For You" (等你下課)	Jay Chou & Gary Yang	"Far Off" (無期)	AGA	
2	"If I Were Young" (年少有为)	Li Ronghao	"Centennial trees" (百年树木)	Hins Cheung	
3	"Decency" (体面)	Kelly Yu	"Gradually" (渐渐)	Eason Chan	
4	"17"	S.H.E.	"Prodigy 1985" (天才兒童1985)	Hins Cheung	
5	"A Friend I Have Loved for a Long Time" (愛了很久的朋友)	Hebe Tien	"Love as Ever" (认真如初)	Jason Chan	
6	"Pull Up"	Cai Xukun	"Creo en Mi"	Sammi Cheng	
7	"Tik Tok" (倒数)	G.E.M.	"Can Be Repeated" (可一可再)	Eason Chan	
8	"If You Don't Love Me, It's Fine" (不爱我就拉倒)	Jay Chou	"Grasslands" (草原)	Phil Lam	
9	"Woke" (那一夜)	G.E.M.	"I Just Want to Be with You Again" (只想与你再一起)	Hana	
10	"Learn to Meow" (学猫叫)	Xiaopanpan & Xiaofengfeng	"Little Problem" (小问题)	AGA	

== See also ==
- Billboard China
- Billboard China Airplay/FL
