= AliMusic =

Online music platform owned by Alibaba Group

AliMusic (Chinese: 阿里音乐) is an online music platform affiliated with Alibaba Group, headquartered in Hangzhou, Zhejiang, China.

== Overview ==
AliMusic was established on March 16, 2015, through the merger of Xiami Music and Alibaba Planet (formerly known as Tiantian Fine). According to a 2014 survey released by Bita Consulting, Alibaba Planet held a 17.3% market share among Chinese digital music platforms, and Xiami Music accounted for a 4.6% market share. After the merger, the market share of the two platforms reached 21.9%, and AliMusic become the top platform in China's digital music industry.

In June 2019, Alibaba announced that its proprietary web browser, its online reading platform, and its music service would be placed into a new unit, which will be led by Zhu Shunyan.

Alibaba's main competitors in the digital music arena are Tencent and NetEase. Tencent operates several successful streaming applications, including QQ Music, Kugou, and Kuwo.

== Music licensing and partnerships ==
In September 2017, Tencent music entertainment group and AliMusic announced that the two sides reached a copyright authorization cooperation. AliMusic gained the right to stream music from international labels such as Sony Music, Universal Music Group and YG Entertainment, which had exclusive deals with Tencent, in return for offering to its catalogue from Rock Records, HIM International Music, and so on.

On March 6, 2018, AliMusic and Netease Cloud Music jointly announced that they reached a licensing agreement. In September 2019, Alibaba announced that it had spent US$700m to acquire a minority ownership stake in NetEase Cloud Music.

In July 2019, Alibaba announced a partnership between Xiami Music and Master Quality Authenticated (MQA), through which master-quality high resolution audio streaming will be made available to the Chinese consumer market.
