= Beginner (Joker Xue song) =

Single by Joker Xue

from the album Beginner
- Language: Mandarin
- Released: July 18, 2016
- Recorded: 2016
- Genre: Pop rock
- Length: 4:40
- Label: Ocean Butterflies; Chaoshi
- Songwriter: Joker Xue

Joker Xue singles chronology
"Actor" (2015)	"Beginner" (2016)	"Skyscrapers" (2018)

Music video
- "Beginner" on YouTube

"Beginner" (Chinese: 初学者; pinyin: Chūxuézhě) is a song by Chinese singer-songwriter Joker Xue. It was released on July 18, 2016, as part of his seventh studio album Beginner (2016) under Ocean Butterflies and later acquired by Xue's own label Chaoshi Music. The song was written and composed by Xue.

It served as the focus of Xue's I Think I've Seen You Somewhere Tour and symbolizes his determination to return to music after detouring to hotpot restaurant, streetwear store, and variety show star in order to fund his music.

"Beginner" remained at number one on the Billboard Radio China Top 10 chart for four consecutive weeks, and was ranked number third on the chart's annual ranking for 2016.

== Background ==
"Beginner" was written by Xue while he was filming A Test of Love Adventure (A测试之爱情大冒险). The song also served as the theme song of the film.

Xue was inspired by the film, where six couples tested their belief that their love could withstand anything, and wished to express that "in the world of love, everyone was a beginner once."

== Music video ==
The music video for "Beginner" was directed by Shockley Huang. When Huang studied the lyrics of "Beginner", he felt that the lyrics provided a broad space for imagination. Therefore, Huang wrote the script where Xue accidentally entered a fantasy hotel and met three mysterious female guests who symbolized "eagle", "cat" and "leopard" respectively. In order to highlight the tension of the song, Huang also included a passionate scene between Xue and the "cat" guest.

== Accolades ==
Awards and nominations for "Beginner"
Award	Year	Category	Nominee	Result	Ref.
Global Chinese Music Awards 全球华语歌曲排行榜颁奖典礼	2016	Top 20 Hits of the Year 年度二十大金曲	"Beginner"	Won	
Music Pioneer Awards; 9+2音乐先锋榜	2016	Best Original Song of the Year 年度最佳原创歌曲	"Beginner"	Won	
CMIC Music Awards 唱工委音乐奖	2017	Best Pop Vocal Performance 最佳流行演唱	"Beginner"	Won	
Global Chinese Music Awards 全球华语歌曲排行榜颁奖典礼	2017	Top 20 Hits of the Year 年度二十大金曲	"Beginner"	Won	
Music Radio China Top Chart Awards; Music Radio中国Top排行榜颁奖典礼	2017	Top 20 Hits of the Year 年度二十大金曲	"Beginner"	Won	

== Credits and personnel ==
- Joker Xue – vocals, lyrics, composition
- Zheng Wei – arrangement
- Shockley Huang – director

== Release history ==
Release dates and formats
Region	Date	Album	Format	Label
Various	July 18, 2016	Beginner	Digital download; Streaming; Physical album	Ocean Butterflies
