= Weibo Music Awards =

Annual Chinese music award ceremony

- Logo for the 2024 Weibo Music Awards
- Native name: 微博音乐盛典
- Awarded for: Outstanding achievements in the music industry
- Location: China
- Country: China
- Presented by: Weibo
- Formerly called: Freshasia Music Awards (亚洲新歌榜年度盛典)
- First award: September 27, 2016; 10 years ago

The Weibo Music Awards (Chinese: 微博音乐盛典), formerly known as Freshasia Music Awards (Chinese: 亚洲新歌榜年度盛典), is an annual award show hosted by the Chinese social media website Weibo.

== Background ==
The Weibo Music Awards has been held annually since 2016, with the exception of the years 2020 and 2021. It was originally named Freshasia Music Awards from 2016 to 2019 and was renamed Weibo Music Awards when it resumed in 2022 with new award format.

Logo for the 2017 Freshasia Music Awards

Freshasia Music Awards used data from music streaming platforms plays, shares, and downloads as the standard for nominations and awards. Participating music platforms included Migu Music, Xiami Music, QQ Music, NetEase Cloud Music, and Baidu Music. In addition, social media engagement on Weibo also factored into the decision. Weibo Music Awards recognizes artists based on primarily engagement (votes and shares) on Weibo.

Weibo Music Awards has received criticism for the large number of awards given out (e.g. 2019 Freshasia Music Awards had 30 awards while the 2023 Weibo Music Awards had 67) and the gradual shift toward becoming a marketing platform.

== Winners ==
=== Freshasia Music Awards ===
Below is a list of the winners of major awards at the Freshasia Music Awards from 2016 to 2019.

Year	Best Male Artist	Best Female Artist	Most Popular Artist	Best Group	Most Popular Group	Best Album	Most Popular Album	Ref
2016	Hua Chenyu	Li Yuchun	—N/a	TFBOYS	—N/a	Li Yuchun Growing Wild	—N/a	
2017	Joker Xue	Bibi Zhou	—N/a	TFBOYS	—N/a	Joker Xue Beginner	—N/a	
2018	Jason Zhang	Bibi Zhou	—N/a	SNH48	Rocket Girls 101	—N/a	Bibi Zhou Renamed	
2019	—N/a	—N/a	G.E.M.	—N/a	Rocket Girls 101	—N/a	—N/a	

=== Weibo Music Awards ===
Below is a list of the winners of major awards at the Weibo Music Awards from 2022 to 2024

Year	Best Male Artist	Best Female Artist	Best Group	Ref
2022	Hua Chenyu	Huang Qishan	Teens In Times	
2023	Zhou Shen	Huang Qishan	—N/a	
2024	Zhou Shen	Huang Qishan	—N/a	
