= Wang Beiche =

Chinese singer (born 1995)

- 王北车
- Born: Wang Zhaodong; March 20, 1995 (age 31); Mudanjiang, Heilongjiang, China
- Education: Harbin Normal University
- Occupation: Singer
- Years active: 2017–present
- Notable work: Trap; Girl

Chinese name
- Traditional Chinese: 王北車
- Simplified Chinese: 王北车
Transcriptions
Standard Mandarin
- Hanyu Pinyin: Wāng Běichē

Wang Beiche (Chinese: 王北车; born 20 March 1995) is a Chinese singer.

== Biography ==
Wang was born Wang Zhaodong (Chinese: 王兆东) in Mudanjiang, Heilongjiang, on March 20, 1995. He graduated from Harbin Normal University.

In 2017, he officially joined the Geluren Band and became the lead singer. That same year, he participated in the entertainment show Super Boy on Hunan Television, and was promoted to the top 100. In 2018, he chose to leave the Geluren Band. In July 2018, he released his first single, Trap. He starred opposite Ye Jiayin in the romantic comedy Goodbye, My Belle of Class.

== Singles ==
Year	English title	Chinese title	Notes
10 July 2018	Trap	陷阱	
24 August 2018	Girl	姑娘	

== Filmography ==
=== Film ===
Year	English title	Chinese title	Role	Notes
2018	Goodbye, My Belle of Class	再见班花	Wang Xiaoshi	
