= Hengyang Stadium =

Sports venue in Hengyang, China

- Interactive map of Hengyang Stadium
- Full name: Hengyang Stadium
- Location: Hengyang, China
- Coordinates: 26°53′18″N 112°40′27″E
- Capacity: 35,000

Construction
- Groundbreaking: 2009
- Opened: 2012

Hengyang Stadium is a multi-purpose stadium in Hengyang, China that was completed in 2012. It will be used mostly for football matches. The stadium holds 35,000 spectators. It was due to open in 2012 and broke ground in 2009.
