= How Are You (Joker Xue song) =

Single by Joker Xue

from the album How Are You?
- Language: Mandarin
- Released: July 31, 2007
- Recorded: 2007
- Genre: Pop
- Length: 4:46
- Label: Shang Teng; Chaoshi
- Songwriter: Joker Xue
- Producer: Liu Dajiang

Joker Xue singles chronology
"Serious Snow" (2006)	"How Are You" (2007)	"Actor" (2015)

Music video
- "How Are You" on YouTube

"How Are You" (Chinese: 你过得好吗; pinyin: Nǐ guò dé hǎo ma) is a song by Chinese singer-songwriter Joker Xue. It was released on July 31, 2007 as part of his second album How Are You? by Shang Teng Entertainment and has since been acquired by Xue's own label Chaoshi Music.

Within one month of release, the album sold more than 150,000 copies.

== Background ==
"How Are You" was written and composed by Xue, arranged by Ying Tu, and produced by Liu Dajiang. Xue shared that the song was about "commemorating past love" and "wanting to know how they are doing after the breakup." The song demonstrated growth in Xue's perspective on love, from not wanting a lover to leave in "Serious Snow", to finally having the courage to let go.

"How Are You" premiered on CityFM and Music Radio ahead of the album release.

== Music video ==
The music video for "How Are You" was directed by Jacky Lee, written by Xue, and starred Xue and Zhang Xiaojue as a pair of star-crossed lovers.

Xue revealed he had imagined the scenes in the music video as he was writing the song. The story opened with the man buying his girlfriend a gift to surprise her but was killed in a car accident on his way to her. His spirit lingered, reluctant to leave until he was sure she would be okay without him and able to have a better life, and eventually left with peace of mind. It was a challenge for the director, who was surprised Xue chose to kill the character he himself was portraying, to shoot the car accident without upsetting Xue's fans and decided to shoot the scene from multiple times from different angles.

During filming, Xue did not use a stunt double for the car accident scenes and because there were no special protective measures on the set, he sustained some abrasions and bruising.

== Accolades ==
Awards and nominations for "How Are You"
Award	Year	Category	Work	Result	Ref.
Beijing Pop Music Awards 北京流行音乐典礼	2008	Top 20 Hits of the Year 二十大金曲	"How Are You"	Won	
China's Original Music Popular Chart 中国原创音乐流行榜总选颁奖典礼	2008	Most Promising Singer 最具潜质歌手奖	"How Are You"	Won	
Music Radio China Top Chart Awards; Music Radio中国Top排行榜颁奖典礼	2008	Top Hit of the Year (Mainland) 内地年度金曲	"How Are You"	Won	

== Credits and personnel ==
- Joker Xue – lyrics, composition, vocals
- Ying Tu – arrangement
- Liu Dajiang – producer
- Jacky Lee – director

== Release history ==
Release dates and formats
Region	Date	Format	Label
Various	July 31, 2007	Digital download; streaming	Shang Teng Entertainment
