= Harbin Normal University =

University in Harbin, China

Coordinates: 45°52′07″N 126°33′37″E

- 哈尔滨师范大学
- Type: Public
- Established: 1951
- President: Wang Xuanzhang
- Students: 32,000
- Location: Harbin, Heilongjiang, China
- Campus: Urban
- Website: www.hrbnu.edu.cn

Harbin Normal University (HNU) (simplified Chinese: 哈尔滨师范大学; traditional Chinese: 哈爾濱師範大學; pinyin: Hā'ěrbīn Shīfàn Dàxué) is a university located in Harbin, Heilongjiang province, China.

== Overview ==
HNU has 27 schools and departments and offers 77 academic majors. It offers undergraduate, graduate, and doctorate degrees. It is a key university of Heilongjiang and is under direct administration of Heilongjiang Province Department of Education. Its predecessor was Hsing-chih Normal School which was named after T'ao Hsing-chih, a famous educationist, and founded in 1946 by the Chinese Communist Party.

HNU covers 3.46 million square meters land, has a building area of 150.1 square meters, a total value of 2.435 billion yuan in fixed assets, and teaching and research equipment worth 2.5 billion yuan.

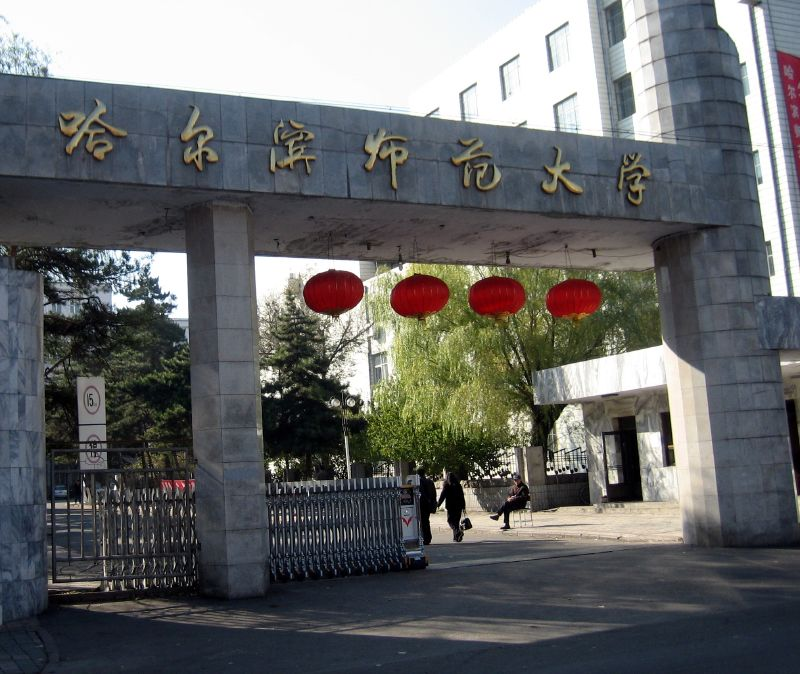
Main gate of Harbin Normal University

HNU adheres to open education, engaging in comprehensive international communications, and has built up relationship of educational technology cooperation and academic exchange with approximately 70 higher education institutions from 20-odd countries. Three Confucius Institute have been set up by HNU.

Daejin University, a South Korean private university, operates one of its two China campuses on the university grounds, with the other campus located at Soochow University in Suzhou. Daejin maintains its own building with accommodation and classrooms. also Yu Wenxia Miss World 2012 completed a four-year course in Folk Music in this university.

== Notable alumni ==
- Wenxia Yu, Miss World 2011
- Wang Beiche, singer

== See also ==
- List of universities in China
