= Puppet (artist) =

Swedish graffiti artist

- Born: 1970 (age 55–56); Westaroze, Sweden
- Style: Graffiti
- Website: puppet.se

Daniel Blomqvist, known as Puppet, born 1970 in Västerås, Sweden, is one of Sweden's most well-known graffiti artists, often referred to as one of the first graffiti writers in Europe.
