= Extraterrestrial (Joker Xue song) =

Single by Joker Xue

from the album Extraterrestrial
- Language: Mandarin
- Released: July 17, 2020
- Recorded: 2020
- Genre: Pop; pop rock
- Length: 4:17
- Label: Huayu World Expo; Chaoshi
- Songwriters: Joker Xue; Luo Xiaohei

Joker Xue singles chronology
"Puppet" (2019)	"Extraterrestrial" (2020)

Music video
- "Extraterrestrial" on YouTube

"Extraterrestrial" (Chinese: 天外来物; pinyin: Tiān wài lái wù) is a song by Chinese singer-songwriter Joker Xue. It was released on Xue's 37th birthday on July 17, 2020, as a single and then included on his eleventh album Extraterrestrial by Huayu World Expo; both have since been acquired by Xue's own label Chaoshi Music.

It peaked at number four on Tencent Music's UNI Chart.

"Extraterrestrial" serves as the inspiration for and bookends the set list of Xue's record-breaking Extraterrestrial World Tour.

== Background ==
Prior to the release of the song, Xue hinted at the possibility of a new song via Weibo. He posted "When I appear in the late night continuously, it means..." (当我连续出现在黑夜的时候, 就代表....) on July 10, then "If there is no birthday, what new song to listen to..." (没有生辰, 听什么新歌....) on July 14. The latter especially generated interest as Xue had previously released "Half a Beat Slower" on his birthday last year and this could be the beginning of a new birthday tradition between Xue and his fans.

"Extraterrestrial", the lead single and titular track of Xue's eleventh album, has a pop rock style and utilizes a string arrangement with drum beats. Xue said the meaning of the song, to him, is that there is someone in this world who is unique to you (非你不可).

== Music video ==
The music video for "Extraterrestrial" was directed by Niu Chao and starred Xue and Stephy Qi. It was released on November 11, 2020. The music video integrates the sense of time through different settings with gradually warming and darkening color palates, creating an emotional foundation that has a time limit and is about to be lost.

A barcode was shown on the back of Qi's neck that is valid until November 22, 2020, which was shown at the beginning of the music video as today's date and marked the day as the last day Xue and Qi had together. At the end of the music video, Qi faded away but the last scene revealed that Xue also had a barcode on the back of his neck, corresponding to the last line of the song "trade my tomorrow for a chance of you approach (用明天换你 靠近我)".

== Accolades ==
+ Awards and nominations for "Extraterrestrial"
Award	Year	Category	Nominee	Result	Ref.
2020	Tencent Music Entertainment Awards 腾讯音乐娱乐盛典	Top 10 Hits of the Year 年度十大金曲	"Extraterrestrial"	Won	
2021	Asian Pop Music Awards 亚洲流行音乐大奖	Top 20 Songs of the Year 年度TOP20金曲	"Extraterrestrial"	Won	
2021	Asian Pop Music Awards 亚洲流行音乐大奖	People's Choice Award (Chinese) 大众选择奖(华语)	"Extraterrestrial"	2nd place	
2021	Chinese Top Ten Music Awards 东方风云榜颁奖典礼	Top 10 Hits of the Year 年度十大金曲	"Extraterrestrial"	Won	
2021	CMIC Music Awards 唱工委音乐奖	Song of the Year 年度歌曲	"Extraterrestrial"	Nominated	
2021	CMIC Music Awards 唱工委音乐奖	Best Music Video 最佳音乐录影带	"Extraterrestrial"	Nominated	

== Credits and personnel ==
- Joker Xue – lyrics, vocals
- Luo Xiaohei - composition
- Zhou Yili – arrangement, production
- Niu Chao – director

== Release history ==
Release dates and formats
Region	Date	Format	Label
Various	July 17, 2020	Digital download; streaming	Huayu World Expo
