= Puppet (Joker Xue song) =

Single by Joker Xue

from the album Dust
- Language: Mandarin
- Released: June 26, 2019
- Recorded: 2019
- Genre: Pop; R&B
- Length: 4:46
- Label: Huayu World Expo; Chaoshi
- Songwriter: Joker Xue

Joker Xue singles chronology
"Skyscrapers" (2018)	"Puppet" (2019)	"Extraterrestrial" (2020)

Music video
- "Puppet" on YouTube

"Puppet" (Chinese: 木偶人; pinyin: Mù'ǒurén) is a song by Chinese singer-songwriter Joker Xue. It was released on June 26, 2019 as a single and part of his tenth album Dust by Huayu World Expo; both have since been acquired by Xue's own label Chaoshi Music.

It ranked number one on Billboard China Top 100 for three consecutive weeks, Hit FM weekly chart for four consecutive weeks, and Tencent Music's UNI Chart for two consecutive weeks. Billboard magazine included "Puppet" (木偶人) on their The Global No. 1s You (Probably) Never Heard list, describing the song as a "soaring ballad about a failing relationship."

== Background ==
"Puppet" was written and composed by Xue, and arranged and produced by Chen Di. As the lead single, "Puppet" conveys the theme of the album: a journey of illusions seen through the eyes of a puppet and upon reaching its destination, the illusions scatter to dust. While we may envy and wish to be a puppet without emotions and therefore cannot feel pain, we ultimately realize that is an impossible task: "No one can become a puppet, it's just a process of evading emotions (没有人能变成木偶人, 无非是在感情里的逃避过程)."

== Music video ==
The music video for "Puppet" was directed by Taiwanese director duo Howard Kuo and Allen Shen. To construct the puppet world, the music video incorporated fantasy elements and steampunk aesthetics to tell the cautionary tale of a puppet who repeatedly gives up the most precious traits in exchange for the most desired things, likening the loss of sincerity to a disease.

== Accolades ==
Awards and nominations for "Puppet"
Award	Year	Category	Work	Result	Ref.
Migu Music Awards 音乐盛典咪咕汇	2019	Top 10 Hits of the Year 年度十大金曲	"Puppet"	Won	
Chinese Music Awards 华语金曲奖	2020	Best Mandarin Song of the Year 年度最佳国语歌曲	"Puppet"	Won	
Chinese Music Awards 华语金曲奖	2020	Top Ten Mandarin Songs 国语十大金曲	"Puppet"	Won	
Chinese Music Awards 华语金曲奖	2020	Lyricist of the Year 年度最佳作词人	"Puppet"	Nominated	
Chinese Music Awards 华语金曲奖	2020	Composer of the Year 年度最佳作曲人	"Puppet"	Nominated	
CMIC Music Awards 唱工委音乐奖	2020	Best Composition 最佳作曲	"Puppet"	Nominated	

== Credits and personnel ==
- Joker Xue – lyrics, composition, vocals
- Chen Di – arrangement, production
- Howard Kuo, Allen Shen – director

== Release history ==
Release dates and formats
Region	Date	Format	Label
Various	June 26, 2019	Digital download; streaming	Huayu World Expo
