= Skyscrapers (song) =

Single by Joker Xue

from the album Freak
- Language: Mandarin
- Released: April 18, 2018
- Recorded: 2018
- Genre: Pop; R&B
- Length: 3:50
- Label: Huayu World Expo; Chaoshi
- Songwriter(s): Joker Xue; Tang Hanxiao
- Producer(s): Joker Xue

Joker Xue singles chronology
| "Animal World" (2017) | "Skyscrapers" (2018) | "Puppet" (2019) |

Music video
- "Skyscrapers" on YouTube

"Skyscrapers" (Chinese: 摩天大楼; pinyin: Mótiāndàlóu) is a song by Chinese singer-songwriter Joker Xue. It was released on April 18, 2018 as a single then later included on his ninth studio album Freak (2018) under Huayu World Expo; both of which have been acquired by Xue's own label Chaoshi Music.

"Skyscrapers" was noted for breaking through the "Xue Style Love Song" Xue is known for and expanding beyond the themes of romantic love. It served as the theme of Xue's Skyscraper World Tour, where the setlist and stage performances conveyed the aspirations of the song .

In May 2018, "Skyscrapers" ranked first on Billboard Radio China Top 10 Chart.

== Background ==
"Skyscrapers" was written and produced by Xue, and composed by Tang Hanxiao, with drums and guitar by Zhang Yadong. This song is Xue's first collaboration with Tang and Zhang. Beginning with piano, the arrangement of strings is added at the beginning of the chorus, which promotes the sense of mystery and alienation. The second verse of the song features garbled electronic sound effects, a metaphor for the weight of greed straining the skyscraper, then the drums are added, pushing the mood of the song upward. The arrangement then reaches its climax, showing the self-doubt and emptiness in people's hearts after getting what they want.

Zhang, in a June 2019 interview, revealed he only received the music when he recorded the song and not the lyrics. When he finally reviewed the lyrics, he was deeply impressed by Xue's artistry and moved by the opening line: This structure, prevents the equally distributed sunlight from shining through (结构 让平分的阳光已穿不透). The line set the scene and tone for the song about the connection between growth and desire where we all get lost in the torrent of material things while climbing higher and higher, but the hope is that we will remember the original innocence of our dream when we reach the top of our own personal skyscrapers.

The last lines of the song included mentions of a "dilapidated ant building" (破旧蚁楼), calling back to the "structure" (结构) in the opening line and completing the story about greed with a final plea to "please destroy my skyscraper" (请毁掉我的摩天大楼).

== Music video ==
Directed by Leo Liao and Daniel Chen, the music video for "Skyscrapers" used gloom and grotesqueness to expose the dark ugliness of greed and make a strong sensory impact. The most memorable imagery is the unique metaphor of the skyscraper architecture being the human spine, which symbolizes that as we grow, so do our aspiration and greed.

The music video alternates between the main storyline and Xue singing while playing piano. The story begins with a child opening a jar and releasing the sealed "innocence" within, the next scene shows to a group of adults discarding traits such as "contentment" and "calm" in exchange for a skyscraper that rises out of the ground, and the climax features an extravagant party inside the skyscraper that quickly turns morbid with excess, which causes the skyscraper to collapse. In the final scene, the child is shown holding the jar containing "innocence" again but this time, when he moves to open it, Xue steps in and gently stops him.

== Accolades ==
Awards and nominations for "Skyscrapers"
| Award | Year | Category | Nominee | Result | Ref. |
|---|---|---|---|---|---|
| Global Chinese Pop Chart 华人歌曲音乐盛典 | 2018 | Top Hit of the Year 年度金曲 | "Skyscrapers" | Won | |
| Migu Music Awards 音乐盛典咪咕汇 | 2018 | Top 10 Hits of the Year 年度十大金曲 | "Skyscrapers" | Won | |
| Q China Annual Music Ceremony; Q China 年度音乐盛典 | 2019 | Best Song of the Year 年度最佳单曲 | "Skyscrapers" | Won | |

== Credits and personnel ==
- Joker Xue – lyrics, production, vocals, background vocals
- Tang Hanxiao – composition, arrangement
- Zheng Wei – arrangement
- Zhang Yadong – drums, guitar
- Leo Liao – director
- Daniel Chen – director

== Release history ==
Release dates and formats
| Region | Date | Format | Label |
|---|---|---|---|
| Various | April 18, 2018 | Digital download; streaming | Huayu World Expo |
