= NetEase Cloud Music =

Chinese music streaming service

- Developer: NetEase
- Release: April 23, 2013
- Operating system: Windows (Win32/UWP), Mac OS, Linux, iOS, Android, Windows Phone, Web page
- Available in: Chinese
- Website: music.163.com

NetEase Cloud Music (Chinese: 网易云音乐) is a Chinese freemium music streaming service developed and owned by NetEase, Inc. The streaming service was launched to the public on 23 April 2013. In April 2017 it received its series A financing of 750 million CNY (US$107 million), and was valued at 8 billion CNY (US$1.14 billion). The main features of NetEase Cloud Music include playlists, live streaming, online karaoke, and social networking. As of May 2022, more than 450,000 independent musicians have registered with NetEase Cloud Music, rising to over 611,000 registered artists by December 2022 with a music database consisting of over 60 million songs. It is one of the biggest competitors in the Chinese music streaming business, primarily competing with Tencent's QQ Music.

== Business service ==
NetEase Cloud Music operates under a freemium business model in which basic services are free whilst some enhanced features are available on a subscription basis. NetEase Cloud Music's primary income has two components: music streaming services and social entertainment services. Similar to QQ Music, artists and labels can choose to restrict content to paying subscribers or have their albums purchasable on their website. Artists that allow album purchases of this type include Taylor Swift and Ariana Grande. Users who purchase albums can listen to their purchased songs without a membership.

=== Accounts and subscription ===
As of September 2022, NetEase Cloud Music currently offers three subscription types. Subscriptions are purchasable by a mobile device or via the website, with iPhone payments processed via Apple's App Store, and website payments being processed via WeChat Pay, Alipay, or NetEase Pay.

Member Type	Privileges
Free Member	Access to part of the songs, normal song quality
Premium Member (Vinyl Member)	Access to all songs, adjustable song quality, special sound effects, customized themes, reduced advertisements, digital albums, audiobooks, multiple devices

=== Social entertainment service ===
NetEase Cloud Music's social entertainment services include such features as live streaming, virtual items, and online karaoke. These services help increase the platform's overall profit by encouraging users to become live streaming-related memberships or give virtual gifts to anchors. In NetEase Cloud Music's revenue for the first half of 2022, the social entertainment service and other revenue increased 57% to $2.48 billion.

=== Listening limitations ===
NetEase Cloud Music currently only operates in China. The official Android app of NetEase music is virtually unknown to listeners outside of China, for two reasons. First, the app is in Chinese and most of the tracks are playable in China only; and second, the app is not available on Google Play Store. NetEase app is available in Apple App store. However, its English version is currently not published.

== Promotions ==
=== NetEase Depression Cloud ===
NetEase Cloud Music, China's leading music streaming service with over 800 million users, is sometimes punned "NetEase Depression Cloud", which refers to sentimental stories posted for likes in the comments section of songs. On 3 August 2020, NetEase Cloud Music officially launched a campaign to "cure comments" of feigned depression and provide emotional support to users who are genuinely struggling with mental health issues.

The phenomenon sparked a new meme dubbed "NetEmo(网抑云)", which took off after some users poked fun at apparently made-up stories of not really depressed people. "It's midnight, NetEmo mode activated," read one meme featuring a clock and tears streaming down a face. On November 8, 2020, "NetEmo" was selected as one of the "China's Top 10 Trending Words in 2020" by Youth Digest, a Chinese magazine.

=== NetEase Cloud Music's H5 Advertisements ===
NetEase makes use of H5 advertisements, that is, interactive web page advertisements which can be disseminated among social media platforms. Based on the summary of users' behaviors on the platform, NetEase Cloud Music has created many trending H5 advertisements, such as "Annual Listening Reports", "Test Your Philosophical Temperament", "Jung personality test", and "Your Instruction Manual". These advertisements target a wide range of audiences.

== Controversies ==
=== Jay Chou's songs removal incident ===
Jay Chou is one of the biggest pop stars in China. From 2015 to 2017, NetEase paid Tencent each year to sub-license Jay Chou's 808 songs. On April 1, 2018, after the sub-license lapsed, NetEase released a "Jay Chou Hot Song Collection" at a price of 400 yuan. Subsequently, Tencent Music sued NetEase Cloud Music for violating Audio and Video Producers' Rights and claimed 4.99 million yuan. According to the Music Licensing Cooperation Agreement signed by the two companies, NetEase Cloud Music should immediately removed licensed tracks and delete them from the servers. The court supported part of the Tencent Music's claim, and ruled that NetEase Cloud violated the copyrights of Jay Chou's songs.

=== NetEase Cloud Music suspected of vulgar content ===
In June 2018, China's "Fight Pornography and Illegality" office interviewed the heads of NetEase Cloud Music, and asked it to vigorously clean up ASMR content involving pornography and vulgarity, and strengthen the supervision and review of related content.

== Stable releases ==
Platform	Version
Windows (PC/UWP)	2.5.3/1.2.3
macOS	2.1.2
iPhone	5.7.4
iPad	1.6.2
Windows Phone	1.5.0
Android	5.8.0
Linux (Ubuntu/Deepin)	1.1.0
