= List of Cyndi Wang concerts =

Cyndi Wang concerts
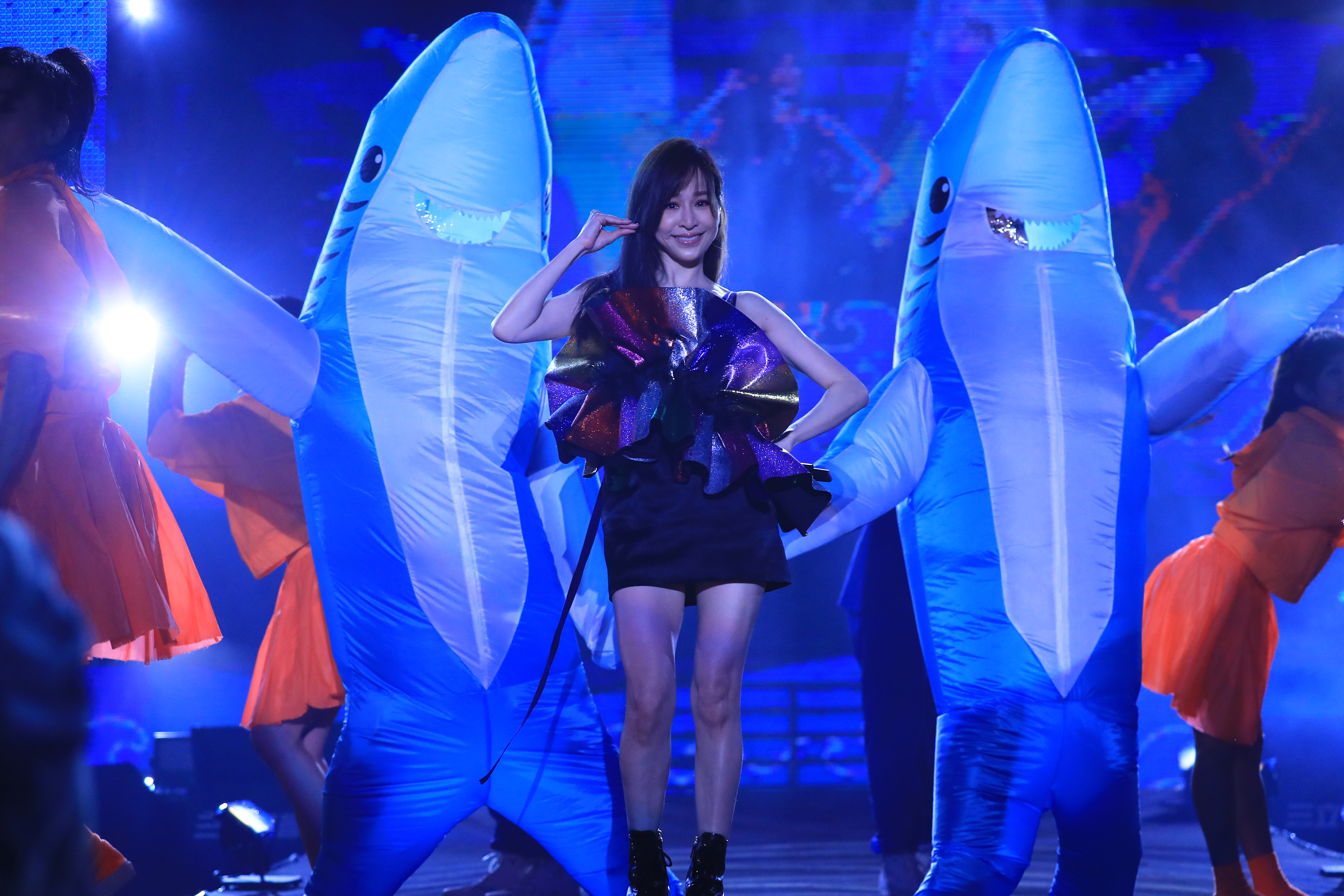
- Wang in 2020
- Concert tours: 3
- One-off concerts: 11
- Collaboration concerts: 1

This is a list of concert of Taiwanese singer Cyndi Wang (Chinese: 王心凌). Wang had performed on 3 concert tours, 11 one-off concerts and 1 collaboration concert. On June 26, 2004, Wang held her first concert, Wonderland Concert in Taichung at Chiang Kai-shek Memorial Hall. On December 11, Wang performed on J-Stars 2004 Live Concert in Singapore at Singapore Expo, a concert held by her artiste management company, Jungiery Star. On April 2, 2005, Wang held Thank You Honey Concert in New Taipei City at Tamsui Fisherman's Wharf. On January 14, 2006, Wang held Cyndi No.1 Concert in Tainan at Tainan City West Hall Square. On November 10, 2007, Wang held her first ticketed concert, Cyndi Wang Live In Genting in Genting Highlands, Malaysia at Arena of Stars.

On July 3, 2011, Wang held Sticky Concert in Taipei at Riverside Live House. On September 5, 2012, Wang held Beard Tax Birthday Concert in Taipei at Riverside Live House. On January 4, 2013, Wang held her first ticketed conceret in Taiwan, Love? Or Not? Live Concert in Taipei at Taipei Legacy. On January 12, she held Love? Or Not? Album Concert in Hangzhou at Dongpo Theatre. On November 14, 2015, Wang performed on Sweet Party YY Concert in Shenzhen at A8 Live. In 2016, Wang held her first concert tour, Cyndi Wants! World Tour. The tour concert began in Taipei at Taipei Arena, followed by Hangzhou, Chengdu, Nanjing and Shenzhen.

On January 25, 2019, Wang held Cyndiloves2sing concert in Beijing. In 2019, Wang held her second concert tour, Cyndiloves2sing Live Tour. On December 6, 2020, Wang held Cyndi's Collection TME Live Online Concert. In 2023, Wang held her third concert tour, Sugar High World Tour. The tour concert began in Taipei at Taipei Arena, followed by Shanghai, Guangzhou, Chengdu, Malaysia, Macau, Beijing, Singapore, America and other locations. On April 6, 2024, the tour was upgraded to 1.5 version since the concert in Beijing.

== Concert tours ==
Title	Date	Associated album(s)	Continent(s)	Shows
Cyndi Wants! Tour	January 2, 2016 – September 23, 2017	Cyndi Wants or Not?	Asia	5
Cyndiloves2sing Tour	June 29, 2019 – January 15, 2022	Cyndiloves2sing	Asia	8
Sugar High World Tour	September 23, 2023 – January 24, 2026	Bite Back	Asia; North America	77

== One-off concerts ==
Title	Date	City	Country	Venue	Ref.
Wonderland Concert	June 26, 2004	Taichung	Taiwan	Chiang Kai-shek Memorial Hall	
Thank You Honey Concert	April 2, 2005	New Taipei City	Taiwan	Tamsui Fisherman's Wharf	
Cyndi No.1 Concert	January 14, 2006	Tainan	Taiwan	Tainan City West Hall Square	
Cyndi Wang Live In Genting	November 10, 2007	Genting Highlands	Malaysia	Arena of Stars	
Sticky Concert	July 3, 2011	Taipei	Taiwan	Riverside Live House	
Beard Tax Birthday Concert	September 5, 2012	Taipei	Taiwan	Riverside Live House	
Love? Or Not? Live Concert	January 4, 2013	Taipei	Taiwan	Taipei Legacy	
Love? Or Not? Album Concert	January 12, 2013	Hangzhou	China	Dongpo Theatre	
Sweet Party YY Concert	November 14, 2015	Shenzhen	Taiwan	A8 Live	
Cyndiloves2sing Concert	January 25, 2019	Beijing	China	—	
Cyndi's Collection TME Live Online Concert	December 6, 2020	—	Taiwan	—	

== Collaboration concerts ==
Title	Date	Artist	City	Country	Venue	Ref.
J-Stars 2004 Live Concert in Singapore	December 11, 2004	J-Stars	Singapore	Singapore	Singapore Expo	

== As a special guest ==
Title	Date	Artist	City	Country	Venue	Ref.
Shin Singapore Concert	2003	Shin (band)	Singapore	Singapore	Singapore Expo	
K ONE Debut Concert	November 1, 2003	K ONE	New Taipei City	Taiwan	Xinzhuang Gymnasium	
5566 Asia Tour	August 28, 2004	5566	Taipei	Taiwan	Taipei Gymnasium	
Just JJ World Tour	June 10, 2006	JJ Lin	Shanghai	China	Hongkou Football Stadium	
Tainan Celebration Concert	December 29, 2007	Show Lo	Tainan	Taiwan	Tainan City West Hall Square	
3D Show World Live Tour	May 16, 2010	Show Lo	Taipei	Taiwan	Taipei Arena	
3D Show World Live Tour	November 5, 2010	Show Lo	Hangzhou	China	Huanglong Sports Center	
Absolutely Yours Celebration Concert	October 13, 2012	Will Pan	Taipei	Taiwan	Neo Studio	
A Tale Of Two Rainie Musical Theater	December 27, 2014	Rainie Yang	Taichung	Taiwan	National Taichung Theater	
On The Way To The Stars Concert	May 16, 2015	Kenji Wu	Taipei	Taiwan	Huashan Theatre	
Timeline World Tour	September 26, 2015	JJ Lin	Nanchang	China	Nanchang International Sports Center	
Youth Lies Within World Tour	August 25, 2018	Rainie Yang	Beijing	China	Cadillac Arena	
Like A Star World Tour	November 7, 2020	Rainie Yang	Taipei	Taiwan	Taipei Arena	
One Hundred Thousand Volts Tour	July 21, 2024	Silence Wang	Nanjing	China	Nanjing Olympic Sports Centre	
