= Cyndi Wang discography =

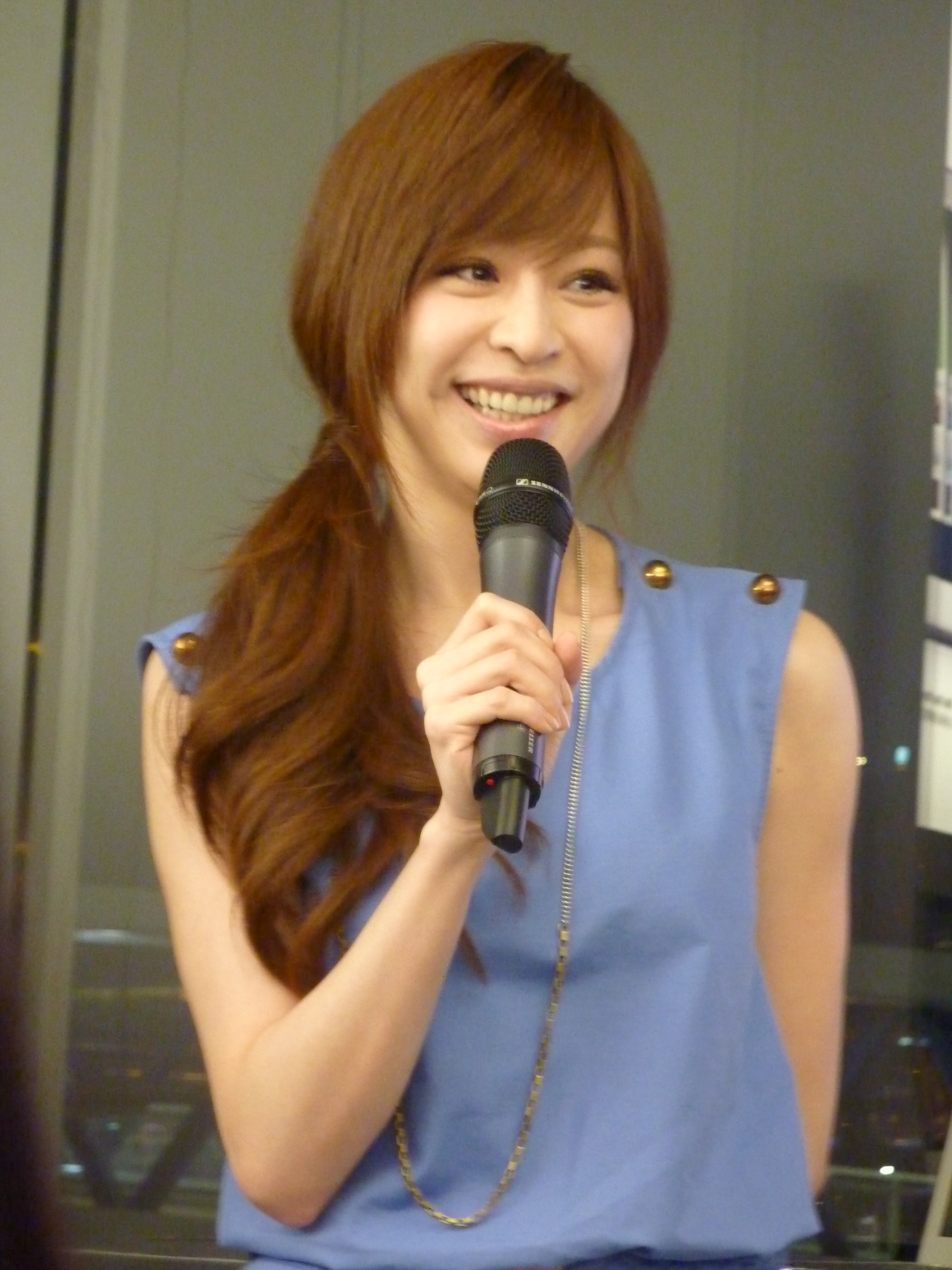
- Wang in 2015
- Studio albums: 13
- Compilation albums: 4
- Live albums: 1

The discography of Taiwanese singer Cyndi Wang consists of thirteen studio albums, four compilation albums, and one live album. According to CCTV, she has sold over 10 million copies of her albums throughout Asia by 2013.

== Studio albums ==
List of studio albums, with release date, label, and sales shown
Title	Album details	Peak chart positions		Sales
Title	Album details	TWN	SGP	Sales
Begin...	Released: 24 February 2003; Label: Avex Taiwan; Formats: CD, cassette	—	3	Asia: 400,000; TWN: 60,000
Cyndi Loves You (愛你)	Released: 26 March 2004; Label: Avex Taiwan; Formats: CD, digital download	—	1	Asia: 1,600,000; TWN: 220,000
Honey	Released: 18 February 2005; Label: Avex Taiwan; Formats: CD, digital download	—	1	Asia: 1,200,000; TWN: 180,000
Cyndi With U	Released: 27 December 2005; Label: Avex Taiwan; Formats: CD, digital download, streaming	1	—	Asia: 1,600,000; TWN: 180,000
Magic Cyndi	Released: 30 April 2007; Label: Avex Taiwan; Formats: CD, digital download, streaming	1	—	Asia: 1,450,000; TWN: 80,000
Fly! Cyndi	Released: 30 November 2007; Label: Avex Taiwan; Formats: CD, digital download, streaming	1	—	
Heart2Heart (心電心)	Released: 4 December 2009; Label: Gold Typhoon; Formats: CD, digital download, streaming	1	—	
Sticky (黏黏²)	Released: 27 May 2011; Label: Gold Typhoon; Formats: CD, digital download, streaming	1	—	
Love? Or Not? (愛不愛)	Released: 30 November 2012; Label: Universal Music Taiwan; Formats: CD, digital download, streaming	7	—	
The 10th Cyndi (第十個王心凌)	Released: 25 July 2014; Label: Universal Music Taiwan; Formats: CD, digital download, streaming	1	—	
Cyndi Wants or Not? (敢要敢不要)	Released: 4 December 2015; Label: Universal Music Taiwan; Formats: CD, digital download, streaming	—	—	
Cyndiloves2sing (愛·心凌)	Released: 7 December 2018; Label: Universal Music Taiwan; Formats: CD, digital download, streaming	—	—	
Bite Back	Released: 12 October 2023; Label: Sony Music Taiwan; Formats: CD, digital download, streaming	—	—	

== Compilation albums ==
Title	Album details	Peak chart positions	Sales
Title	Album details	TWN	Sales
Shining 2005	Released: 26 July 2005; Label: Avex Taiwan; Formats: CD, digital download	1	Asia: 1,100,000; TWN: 150,000
Red Cyndi	Released: 29 February 2008; Label: Avex Taiwan; Formats: CD, digital download	2	
Beautiful Days	Released: 13 November 2009; Label: Avex Taiwan; Formats: CD, digital download	—	
My! Cyndi!	Released: 5 September 2020; Label: Universal Music Taiwan; Formats: CD, digital download, streaming	—	

== Live albums ==
Title	Album details
Wonderland Concert (夢幻遊園地演唱會DVD)	Released: 3 September 2004; Label: Avex Taiwan; Formats: CD, digital download

== Singles ==
=== As lead artist ===
List of singles
Title	Year	Peak chart positions		Album
Title	Year	CHN TME	MLY Chin.	Album
"When You..." (當你)	2003	—	—	Begin
"Love You" (愛你)	2004	—	1	Cyndi Loves You
"The Day You Went Away" (第一次爱的人)	2004	—	—	Cyndi Loves You
"Honey"	2005	—	—	Honey
"I'll Be Fine" (我会好好的)	2005	—	—	Cyndi With U
"Curved Eyelash" (睫毛彎彎)	2005	—	—	Cyndi With U
"Rainbow's Smile" (彩虹的微笑)	2006	—	—	Smiling Pasta OST
"The Quiet Sea That Summer" (那年夏天寧靜的海)	2007	—	—	Magic Cyndi
"This is Love" (這就是愛)	2007	—	—	Fly Cyndi
"Heart to Heart" (心電心)	2009	—	—	Heart2Heart
"I'm Fine. How About You?" (我很好, 那麼你呢))	2009	—	—	Heart2Heart
"Don't Cry" (不哭)	2011	—	—	Sticky
"Become Strangers" (變成陌生人)	2012	—	—	Love? Or Not?
"A Place I've Never Been" (从未到过的地方)	2014	—	—	The 10th Cyndi
"Chen Shufen and Lin Zhihao" (陈淑芬与林志豪)	2014	—	—	The 10th Cyndi
"Far Away" (遠在眼前的你)	2015	—	—	Cyndi Wants or Not?
"In the Cafe of Lost Youth" (在青春迷失的咖啡館)	2018	34	—	Cyndiloves2sing
"The Big Sleep" (大眠)	2018	26	—	Cyndiloves2sing
"My! Cyndi!"	2020	94	—	My! Cyndi!
"Cyndi Wang's Adventure" (心靈的冒險)	2021	—	—	Non-album single
"Just Like Old Times" (像我们从前)	2023	46	—	Oh My School! OST
"Bite Back"	2023	39	—	Bite Back
"Sugar High"	2023	69	—	Bite Back
"—" denotes releases that did not chart, was not released in that region, or chart did not exist.

== Soundtracks ==
Year	Drama	Track
2003	Westside Story	"When You..." (當你) – insert song; "Suffering" (煎熬) – feat Tony Sun – insert song
2004	Heaven's Wedding Gown	"Flower's Wedding Veil" (花的嫁紗) – opening theme; "Heaven of Love" (愛的天國) – ending theme; "Fighting! My Love" (愛情加油) feat R&B – insert song
2006	Smiling Pasta	"Rainbow's Smile" (彩虹的微笑) – opening theme; "I Do" – insert song; "Dusk Dawn" (黃昏曉) – insert song
2008	Powerpuff Girls Z (Taiwanese version)	"Touch Me!" – opening theme
2009	Momo Love	"What To Do When I Like You?" (喜歡你怎麼辦) – opening theme; "Little Star" (小星星) – insert song
2011	Bread, Love and Dreams	"Love Is Empty" (愛太空) – opening theme (GTV ver. episode 1–36)
2011	Love Keeps Going	"Don't Cry" (不哭) – opening theme; "Stick To You" (黏黏黏黏) – ending theme; "The Next Page Of Me" (下一頁的我) – insert song
2013	Second Life	"A Place I've Never Been" (從未到過的地方) – opening theme
2014	Tie the Knot	"Bump 'n' Bump" (碰碰) – insert song; "Indescribable Flavor" (說不出的味道) – insert song
2018	Oh! My Emperor	"Time Flies" (境遷) – ending theme
