= Cyndi Wang filmography =

Actress filmography

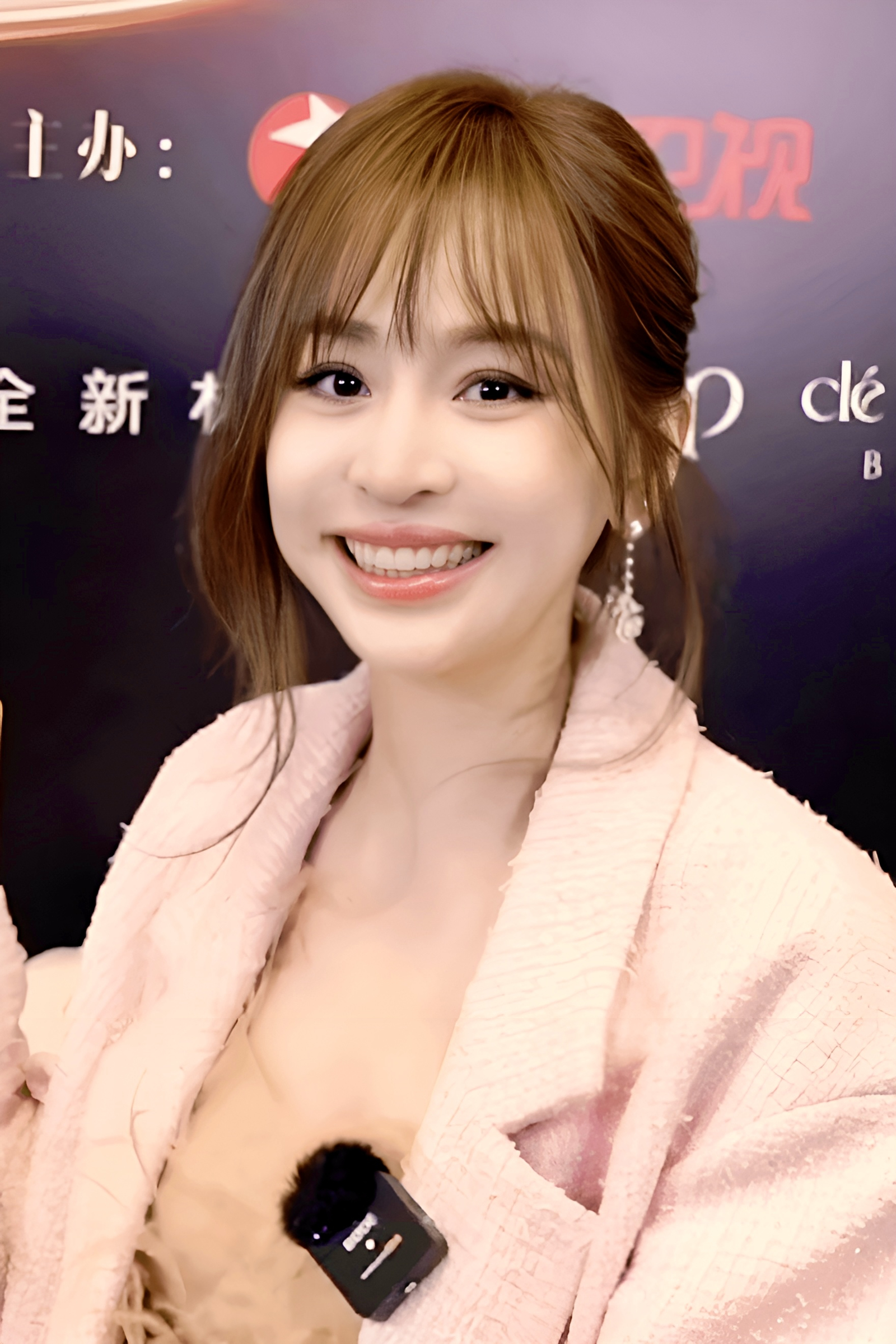
- Television dramas: 8
- Films: 6
- Short films: 1
- Music videos: 12

Taiwanese singer and actress Cyndi Wang (Chinese: 王心凌; pinyin: Wáng Xīnlíng) has been featured in eight television dramas, six films, one short film and twelve other singers' music videos.

== Television dramas ==
Year	English title	Original title	Role	Network	Credit(s)	Ref.
2000	The Car Is In Pursuit	車正在追	Niu Nai (Milk)	PTS	Actress	
2003	Westside Story	西街少年	Shen Yin-he	CTS/SET Metro	Actress	
2004	La Robe De Mariage Des Cieux	天國的嫁衣	Tao Ai-qing	CTS/SET Metro	Actress	
2005	Big Bear Doctor	大熊醫師家	Cameo (ep. 46)	SET Metro	Actress	
2006	Smiling Pasta	微笑Pasta	Cheng Xiao-shi	TTV/SET Metro	Actress	
2008	Momo Love	桃花小妹	Chen Tao-hua	CTV/GTV	Actress	
2011	Love Keeps Going	美樂加油	Zha Mei-le / He Yan-qin	CTV/GTV	Actress	
2013	Second Life	幸福選擇題	Li En-zhen / Chen Zi-zi / Chen Zi-jun	SET Metro	Actress	

== Films ==
Year	English title	Original title	Role	Credit(s)	Ref.
2000	The Cabbie	運轉手之戀	Cameo	Actress	
2007	Ratatouille	料理鼠王	Colette Tatou (voice-over)	Actress (voice)	
2009	Candy Rain	花吃了那女孩	Xiao Yun	Actress	
2016	Go! Crazy Gangster	風雲高手	Liao Xiao Yun	Actress	
2018	Crazy Little Things	為你寫詩	Cyndi Wang Xin-ling	Actress	
2019	Quiet Now	我想靜靜	Lv Wen	Actress	

== Short films ==
Year	English title	Original title	Role	Credit(s)	Ref.
2015	Love's Waltz	愛的圓舞曲	He Xiang-xiang	Actress	

== Music video appearances ==
Year	Song title	Artist
2000	"Commemoration?" (記念)	Tanya Chua
2003	"Suffering" (煎熬)	Tony Sun
2003	"Legend" (傳說)	5566
2004	"Because Of Love" (因為愛)	Jungiery Star
2005	"Degenerate" (變質)	Jones Shi
2006	"Little Turtle" (小烏龜)	Nicholas Teo
2007	"Angel's Wings" (天使的翅膀)	Various Artists
2008	"Na Na Na"	Kenji Wu / Cyndi Wang
2010	"Love's Option" (愛情選項)	Jing Chang
2014	"Hat Trick" (帽子戲法)	Vision Wei
2018	"20"	Ty. / Cyndi Wang
2020	"Girls" (女孩們)	Rainie Yang / Cyndi Wang
