= 2021 National Games of China =

Multi-sport event in Shaanxi, China

14th National Games of the People's Republic of China
- Logo of the 2021 National Games of China
- Host city: Shaanxi
- Country: China
- Events: 412 in 36 sports
- Opening: 15 September 2021
- Closing: 27 September 2021
- Opened by: Xi Jinping; CCP general secretary
- Closed by: Li Keqiang; Chinese premier
- Athlete's Oath: Yang Shunhong (wushu)
- Main venue: Xi'an Olympic Sports Center
- Website: 2021shaanxi.com (archived) sport.gov.cn

The 14th National Games of China (中华人民共和国第十四届运动会), branded as Shaanxi 2021 (陕西2021), was a multi-sports event held throughout Shaanxi from 15 to 27 September 2021 (though some events took place before the Games started). It was projected that the Games would attract around 20,000 athletes who would compete in 409 events in 35 sports. This was the first event in the midst of the COVID-19 pandemic, despite the 2020 Summer Olympics in Tokyo postponed to 2021.

The 14th National Games was one of the first major multi-sport events to allow spectators, which have to provide test certificates within 72 hours prior to entering any venues.

== Bidding process ==
In September 2015, the General Administration of Sport of China officially issued the notice of bid for the 14th National Games. On 19 October, the Shaanxi Provincial People's Government formally submitted the bidding materials to the General Administration of Sports. They were left uncontested and thus Shaanxi was confirmed to be the host on 4 January 2016.

== Venues ==
Many venues as well as public infrastructure were updated in preparation for the Games.

- Xi'an
  - Xi'an Olympic Sports Center Stadium (athletics, opening ceremony)
  - Xi'an Olympic Sports Center Gymnasium (closing ceremony)
  - Xi'an Olympic Sports Center Swimming and Diving Hall (aquatics)
  - Xi'an Qinling International Golf Course (golf)
  - Xi'an City Sports Park Gymnasium (basketball-Xi'an division)
  - Xi'an City Sports Park Competition Venue (3x3 basketball)
  - Outdoor sports rock climbing venue in Yanliang District (rock climbing)
  - Outdoor sports skateboarding venue in Yanliang District (skateboarding)
  - Xi’an Marathon Venue (marathon)
- Provincial Sports Bureau
  - Chang'an Changning Ecological Sports Training and Competition Base (archery)
  - Shaanxi Olympic Sports Center Gymnasium (fencing, gymnastics, closing ceremony alternate)
  - Shaanxi Provincial Sports Training Center (modern pentathlon)
  - Shaanxi Water Sports Management Center kayaking and rowing)
  - Shaanxi Provincial Stadium (opening ceremony alternate, football-Xi'an division)
- School venues
  - Handball Hall of Xi'an Institute of Physical Education (handball)
  - Xi’an Institute of Physical Education (hockey, baseball, softball, rugby)
  - Xi'an University Gymnasium (badminton)
  - Xi’an Middle School Gymnasium (volleyball-Men's Under-20)
  - Soaring Gymnasium of Northwestern Polytechnical University (volleyball-women's adult group)
  - Northwest University Chang'an Campus Gymnasium (trampoline, rhythmic gymnastics)
  - Xi'an Polytechnic University Lintong Campus Cultural and Sports Center (karate)
- Baoji
  - Baoji City Stadium: (football-Baoji Division)
  - Baoji Swimming and Diving Hall: (water polo)
  - Baoji Vocational and Technical College Football Field: Undertake the 14th National Games football match (Baoji Division) project
- Xianyang
  - Xianyang Olympic Sports Center Stadium (football-Xianyang Division)
  - Xianyang Vocational and Technical College Stadium (football-Xianyang Division)
  - Xianyang Vocational and Technical College Gymnasium (wushu taolu)
- Tongchuan
  - Tongchuan City Gymnasium (basketball-Tongchuan Division)
- Weinan
  - Weinan Sports Center Stadium (football-Weinan Division)
  - Weinan Sports Center Gymnasium (weightlifting)
  - Dali Shayuan Sand Volleyball Venue (beach volleyball)
  - Weinan Normal University Gymnasium (Women's Basketball Under-19)
  - Weiqing Park Football Field: (football-Weinan Division)
- Yan'an
  - Mountain bike venue in Huangling National Forest Park: (mountain bike)
  - Yan'an Sports Center Gymnasium (wrestling)
  - Yan'an University Gymnasium (table tennis)
- Yulin
  - Yulin Vocational and Technical College Gymnasium (boxing, volleyball-men's adult)
- Hanzhong
  - Hanzhong Gymnasium (taekwondo)
  - Hanzhong Triathlon Venue (triathlon)
- Ankang
  - Ankang Gymnasium (wushu sanda)
  - Ankang Yinghu Lake: (marathon swimming)
- Shangluo
  - Shangluo Gymnasium (volleyball-Shangluo Division)
  - Shangluo Road Cycling Field (road bicycle)
- Hancheng
  - Hancheng Jiaotong University Basic Education Park Gymnasium (judo)
- Yangling
  - Yangling Tennis Center (tennis)
- Xixian New District
  - Xixian New Area Qin Han New City Equestrian Competition Venue (equestrian)
  - BMX venue in Xixian New District (BMX)
- Wanning
  - Surfing venue at Sun and Moon Bay (surfing)
- Nanjing
  - Breaking venue at Lishui District (breaking)

== The Games ==
=== Sports ===
The program was nearly identical to that of the 2020 Summer Olympics, since the events occurred in close proximity to each other. Breaking and Wushu were the only sports that were added to the program.

- Aquatics
  - Artistic swimming (2)
  - Diving (8)
  - Marathon swimming (2)
  - Swimming (35)
  - Water polo (2)
- Archery (5)
- Athletics (48)
- Badminton (5)
- Baseball
  - Baseball (1)
  - Softball (1)
- Basketball
  - Basketball (2)
  - 3×3 basketball (2)
- Boxing (13)
- Breaking (2)
- Canoeing
  - Slalom (4)
  - Sprint (12)
- Cycling
  - BMX freestyle (2)
  - BMX racing (2)
  - Mountain biking (2)
  - Road cycling (4)
  - Track cycling (12)
- Equestrian
  - Dressage (2)
  - Eventing (2)
  - Jumping (2)
- Fencing (12)
- Field hockey (2)
- Football (2)
- Golf (2)
- Gymnastics
  - Artistic (14)
  - Rhythmic (2)
  - Trampoline (2)
- Handball (2)
- Judo (15)
- Karate
  - Kata (2)
  - Kumite (6)
- Modern pentathlon (2)
- Rowing (14)
- Rugby sevens (2)
- Sailing (10)
- Shooting (15)
- Skateboarding (4)
- Sport climbing (2)
- Square dance (2)
- Surfing (2)
- Table tennis (5)
- Taekwondo (8)
- Tennis (5)
- Triathlon (3)
- Volleyball
  - Volleyball (2)
  - Beach volleyball (2)
- Weightlifting (14)
- Wrestling
  - Freestyle (12)
  - Greco-Roman (6)
- Wushu
  - Taolu (8)
  - Sanda (8)

== Medal table ==
Olympic gold medalist swimmer Wang Shun, from Zhejiang province, won a total of 6 gold medals in this games, bringing his total National Games gold medals tally to 15, surpassing the previous record of 12 gold medals won by Sun Yang.

* Host nation (Shaanxi)

Rank	Province	Gold	Silver	Bronze	Total
1	Shandong	58	55	47	160
2	Guangdong	54	32	56	142
3	Zhejiang	44	35	37	116
4	Jiangsu	42	35	39	116
5	Shanghai	36	27	28	91
6	Hubei	27	18	15	60
7	Fujian	25	17	18	60
8	Hunan	25	13	9	47
9	Sichuan	22	19	23	64
10	Liaoning	22	16	22	60
11	Beijing	21	14	15	50
12	Shaanxi*	19	15	23	57
13	Tianjin	18	10	16	44
14	Henan	16	11	17	44
15	Hebei	15	13	16	44
16	Anhui	12	9	12	33
17	Inner Mongolia	8	5	10	23
18	Yunnan	7	9	8	24
19	Guangxi	7	7	8	22
20	Xinjiang	7	7	7	21
21	Shanxi	6	9	13	28
22	Jiangxi	5	8	6	19
23	Heilongjiang	4	4	6	14
24	Jilin	4	3	8	15
25	Hainan	4	2	1	7
26	Gansu	3	5	3	11
27	Guizhou	3	4	8	15
28	Tibet	3	1	2	6
29	Chongqing	2	8	2	12
30	Qianwei Sports Association	2	2	1	5
31	Hong Kong	2	0	5	7
32	Qinghai	1	3	2	6
33	Locomotive Sports Association	0	0	1	1
33	Macau	0	0	1	1
Totals (34 entries)		524	416	485	1,425
