= Dalian Sports Centre Stadium =

Sports venue in Dalian, China

Coordinates: 39°01′13.7″N 121°33′41.8″E

Dalian Sports Center Stadium; 大连体育中心体育场
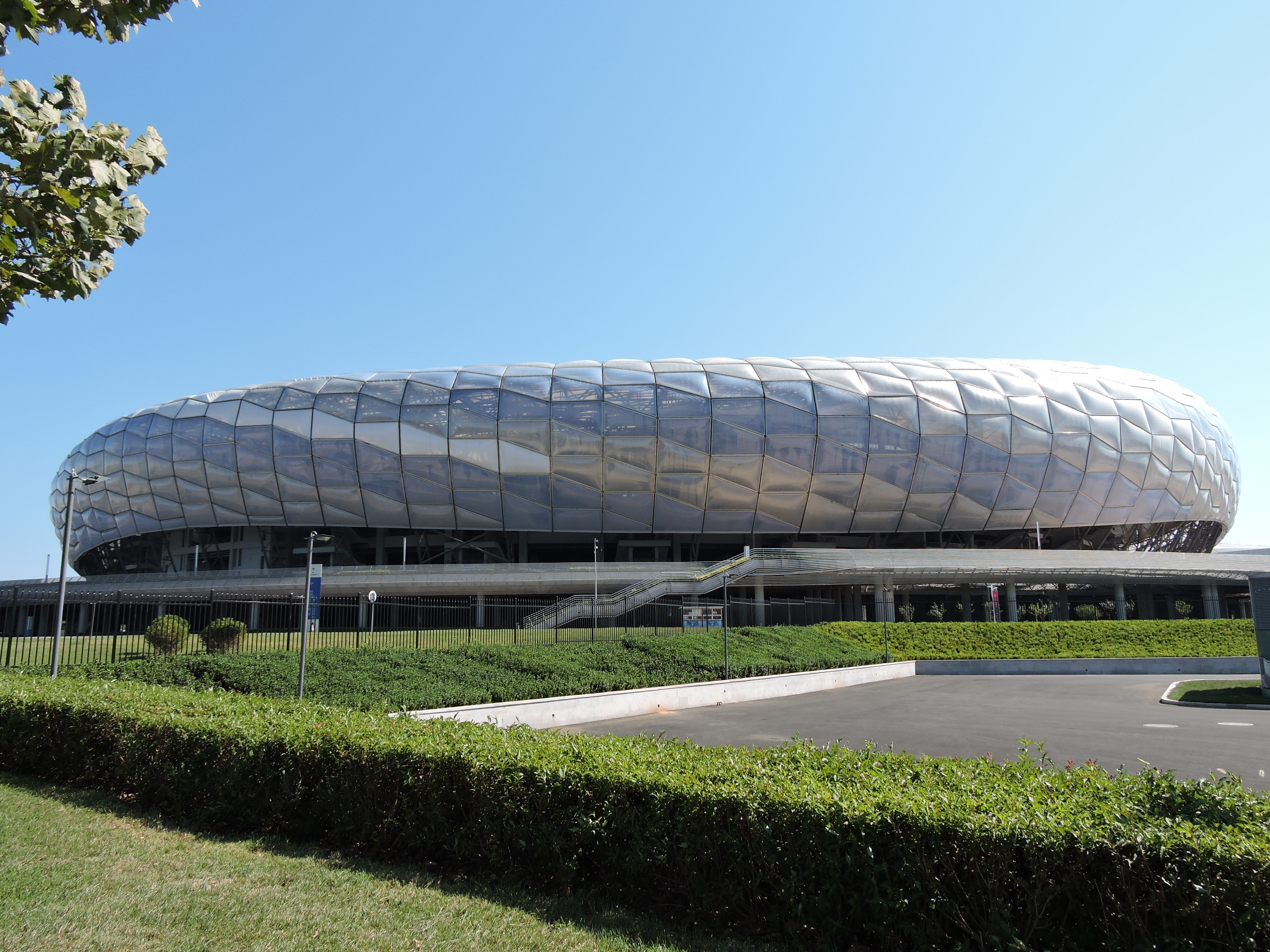
- Interactive map of: Dalian Sports Center Stadium; 大连体育中心体育场
- Full name: Dalian Sports Center Stadium
- Location: 699 Lanling Rd, Ganjingzi District, Dalian, Liaoning, China
- Capacity: 61,000 (Stadium) 18,000 (Arena)
- Public transit: 2 at Sports Center

Construction
- Groundbreaking: May 2009
- Opened: 3 July 2013
- Cost: ¥ 5 billion

Tenants
- Dalian Professional (2014–2020); Shanghai Port (2022)

Dalian Sports Centre Stadium is a multi-purpose stadium in Dalian, Liaoning, China, with a seating capacity of 61,000. Built for the 2013 National Games of China, the stadium has primarily been used for football matches since the conclusion of the event. From 2014 to 2020, it served as the home ground of Dalian Professional F.C.

== Design ==
The Dalian Sports Center Stadium consists of major stadium, arena, tennis pitch, baseball pitch, and swimming stadium. The baseball pitch was re-fitted to football training pitch after the National Games.

In 2020, Dalian Sports Center started its renovation project, in order to meet the requirements for the 2021 FIFA Club World Cup. The stadium would be refitted to professional football pitch with the running track removed, but the project was halted later as China quit hosting the Club World Cup.

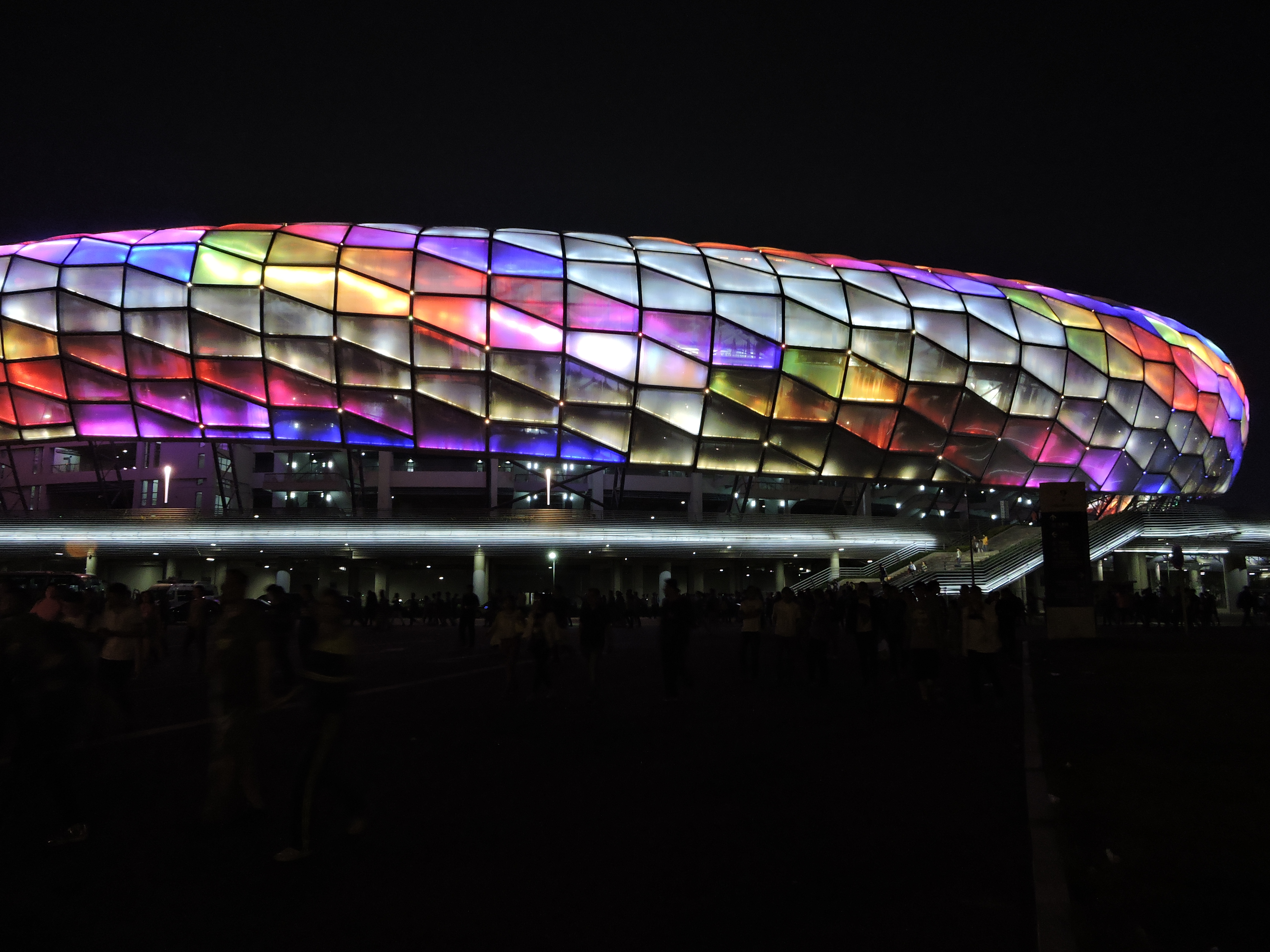
The stadium's illuminated exterior at night

== Notable events ==
=== Sports ===
- September 2013: Men's and women's under-18 football, tennis, gymnastics, artistic swimming of the 2013 National Games of China.
- 2014–2020: Home stadium of Dalian Professional F.C. (formerly known as Dalian Aerbin and Dalian Yifang).
- 2020: 2020 Chinese Super League group A and relegation stage, 2020 Chinese FA Cup first round.
- 2021: 2021 China League One, 2021 Chinese FA Cup.
- 2022: Temporary home stadium of Shanghai Port F.C. in the second stage of the 2022 Chinese Super League.

=== Concerts ===
- Joker Xue - I Think I've Seen You Somewhere Tour - 22 April 2017
- JJ Lin - Sanctuary World Tour - 5 May 2018
- Jay Chou - The Invincible World Tour - 14 and 15 July 2018
- Cyndi Wang- Sugar High World Tour- 6, January 2024
- Joker Xue - Extraterrestrial World Tour - 25 and 26 May 2024
- Joker Xue - The King of Beasts Tour - 19-20, 26-27 September 2026

== See also ==
- List of football stadiums in China
- List of stadiums in China
- Lists of stadiums
