= Xi'an Olympic Sports Center =

Sports complex in Xi'an, Shaanxi, China

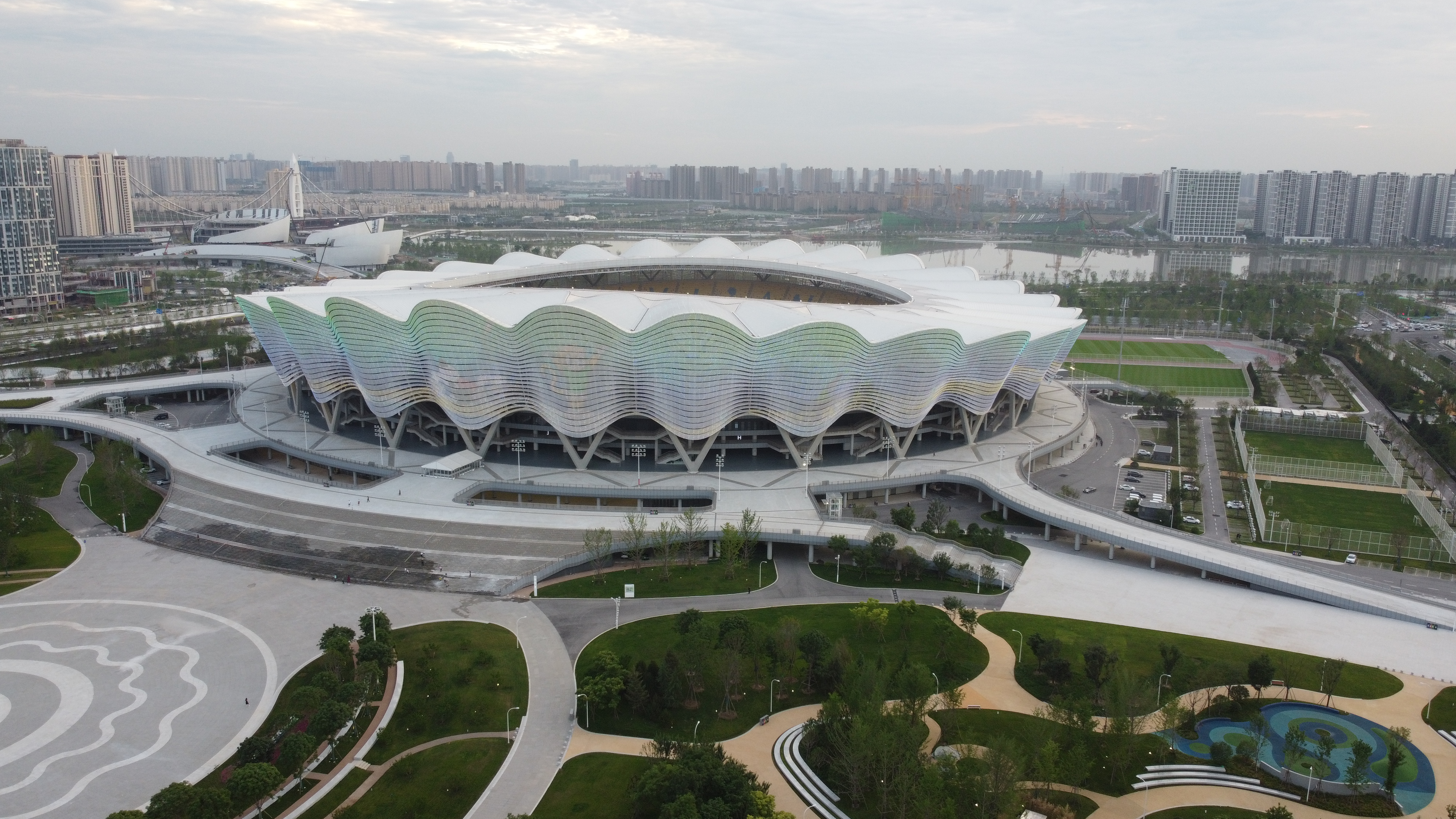
- Interactive map of Xi'an Olympic Sports Center
- Address: 2020 Olympics Ave, Baqiao District, Xi'an, Shaanxi, China
- Coordinates: 34.37821°N 109.01798°E
- Public transit: 14 at Aotizhongxin

Construction
- Built: 9 October 2017 – 23 June 2020
- Cost: CNY 2.5 billion (Stadium Alone); CNY 7.9 billion for (Entire Complex)

The Xi'an Olympic Sports Center is a sports complex with a multi-purpose stadium, a gymnasium and an aquatics center in Xi'an, Shaanxi Province, China.

The building opened in October 2020. The Xi'an Olympic Sports Center was the venue for the athletics and aquatics competitions of the 2021 National Games of China, as well as the opening and closing ceremonies.

The venue has been part of multiple concert tours, including the Jacky Cheung 60+ Concert Tour by Jacky Cheung, the Extraterrestrial World Tour by Joker Xue and the Sugar High World Tour by Cyndi Wang.
