= My! Cyndi! =

Compilation album by Cyndi Wang
- Released: 20 September 2020
- Genre: Pop
- Length: 1:14:55 (Digital); 1:19:28 (Released)
- Label: Universal Music

Cyndi Wang chronology
Cyndiloves2sing (2018)	My! Cyndi! (2020)	Bite Back (2023)

Singles from My! Cyndi!
- 1. "My! Cyndi!" Released: 28 August 2020

My! Cyndi! is a compilation album by Taiwanese singer Cyndi Wang, released on 20 September 2020 by Universal Music. It includes 20 songs, including songs by her two friends, "Invisible Wings" by Angela Chang and "Ambiguous" by Rainie Yang. The songs are all re-recorded in recording studio and remixed into live concert atmosphere.

== Track listing ==
CD1 track listing
No.	Title	Lyrics	Music	Length
1.	"Thunder" (劈你的雷正在路上)	Chen Sih-Yu	Christopher Baran; James Alan Ghaleb; Keta	3:41
2.	"Rainbow Smile" (彩虹的微笑)	Zuo Ke-Huei	Buddy Holly; Norman Petty	2:53
3.	"Love You" (愛你)	Chen Sih-Yu; Pan Ying; Tan Hsiao-Jhen; MC Han	Yong Min Lee; Se Joon Huang	3:31
4.	"Flower's Wedding Veil" (花的嫁紗)	Ke Cheng-Shiung; Tsuei Yan	Tsuei Yan	4:16
5.	"Still Good Friends" (還是好朋友)	Chen Yan-Fu	Myeong Gi Min; Young Min Ahn	3:39
6.	"I'll Be Fine" (我會好好的)	Wu Bai	Wu Bai	4:30
7.	"Moonlight" (月光)	Li Ruo-Jyun	Tan Hsiao-Jhen; Chen Sih-Yu	4:08
8.	"Curved Eyelashes" (睫毛彎彎)	Yao Xiao-Min; Matthew Yen; Chen Sih-Yu	Gary Chaw	3:44
9.	"Heavenly Spirit Of Love+Narcissus+Fly" (愛的天靈靈+水仙+飄飄)	Duan Zih-Wei; Hsiao Shiu-Fu; Liao Shih-Jie; Luke Tsui	Liao Shih-Jie; Gary Chaw	6:59
10.	"Feather" (羽毛)	Daryl Yao	Salsa Chen	2:46
11.	"See You Tomorrow" (明天見)	Chen Jing-Nan	JJ Lin	2:41
12.	"Dusk Dawn" (黃昏曉)	Liao Shih-Jie	Liao Shih-Jie	2:55
13.	"Invisible Wings" (隱形的翅膀)	Tina Wang	Tina Wang	2:21
14.	"Ambiguous" (曖昧)	Chiang I-Hsuan; Yen Jian-Shiuan	Hsiao Leng	2:43
Total length:				50:47

CD2 track listing
No.	Title	Lyrics	Music	Length
1.	"The Big Sleep" (大眠)	Derek Shih	Alex Zhang Jian	4:09
2.	"Tranquil Sea Of That Summer" (那年夏天寧靜的海)	Percy Phang	Percy Phang	4:11
3.	"This Is Love" (這就是愛)	Tan Hsiao-Jhen	Tank	4:02
4.	"First Love" (第一次愛的人)	Lin I-Fen	Ravn Marion Elise; Larsen Marit Elisabeth; Matt Rowe	3:49
5.	"Honey"	Kate Liao	Shih Wan-Da; Choi Eun Ah; Yoon Il Sang	3:33
6.	"Whenever" (當你)	Chang Sih-Er	JJ Lin	4:24
Total length:				24:08

Cassette Special Track Single
No.	Title	Length
1.	"My! Cyndi!" (This is a suite of "Honey" (2005), "Whenever" (2003), "I'll Be Fine" (2005), "Moonlight" (2004), and "Love You" (2004).)	4:34
