= The Theater at Madison Square Garden =

Theater in Manhattan, New York

Infosys Theater at Madison Square Garden

- Exterior View (2026)
- Interactive map of Infosys Theater at Madison Square Garden
- Former names: Felt Forum (1968–89); Paramount Theater (1991–97); The Theater at Madison Square Garden (1997–2007; 2009–18; 2023–2026); WaMu Theater at Madison Square Garden (2007–09); Hulu Theater at Madison Square Garden (2018–23)
- Address: 4 Pennsylvania Plaza
- Location: New York City, New York, U.S.
- Coordinates: 40.750630°N 73.993744°W
- Owner: Madison Square Garden Entertainment
- Capacity: 5,600

Construction
- Opened: February 14, 1968
- Renovated: 1989–91, 2011–13
- Architect: Charles Luckman Associates
- Services engineer: Syska Hennessy
- General contractors: Turner Construction and Del E. Webb Construction Company

Website
- Official website

The Infosys Theater at Madison Square Garden (formerly the Felt Forum, Paramount Theater, The Theater at Madison Square Garden, WaMu Theater at Madison Square Garden and Hulu Theater) is a theater located in New York City's Madison Square Garden (MSG). It seats between 2,000 and 5,600 people and is used for concerts, shows, sports, meetings, and other events. It is situated beneath the main Madison Square Garden arena that hosts MSG's larger events.

== History ==
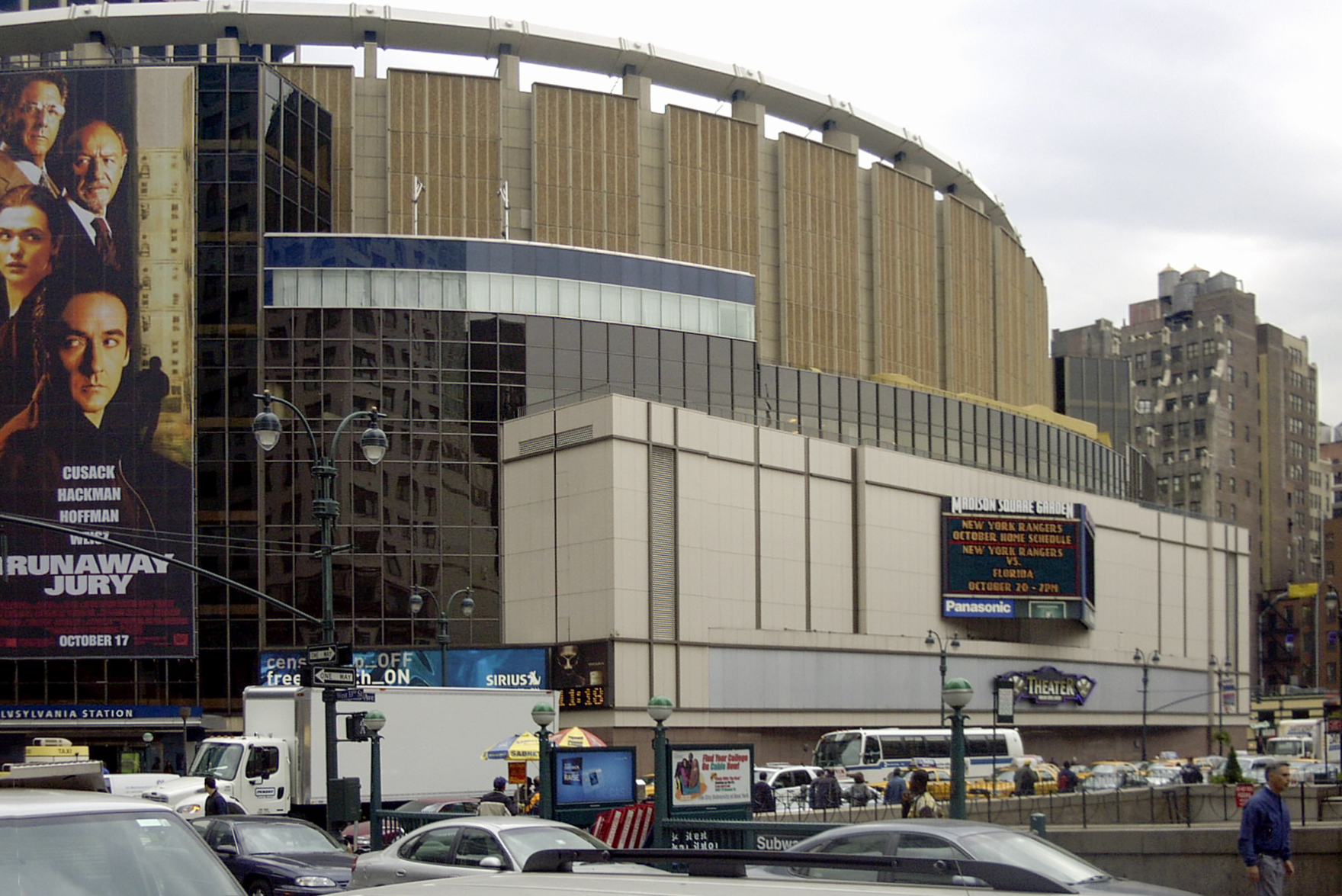
The theater building in October, 2003

When the Garden opened in 1968, the theater was known as the Felt Forum, in honor of then-company president Irving Mitchell Felt. In the early 1990s, at the behest of former MSG President Bob Gutkowski, the theater was renamed the Paramount Theater after the Paramount Theatre in Times Square had been converted to an office tower. The theater received its next name, The Theater at Madison Square Garden, in the mid-1990s, after Viacom bought Paramount and sold the MSG properties. In 2007, the theater was renamed the WaMu Theater at Madison Square Garden through a naming rights deal with Washington Mutual. After Washington Mutual's collapse in 2009, the name reverted to The Theater at Madison Square Garden. In 2018, the theater signed a deal with Hulu to become the Hulu Theater at Madison Square Garden. In 2023, the theater reverted to the name The Theater at Madison Square Garden.

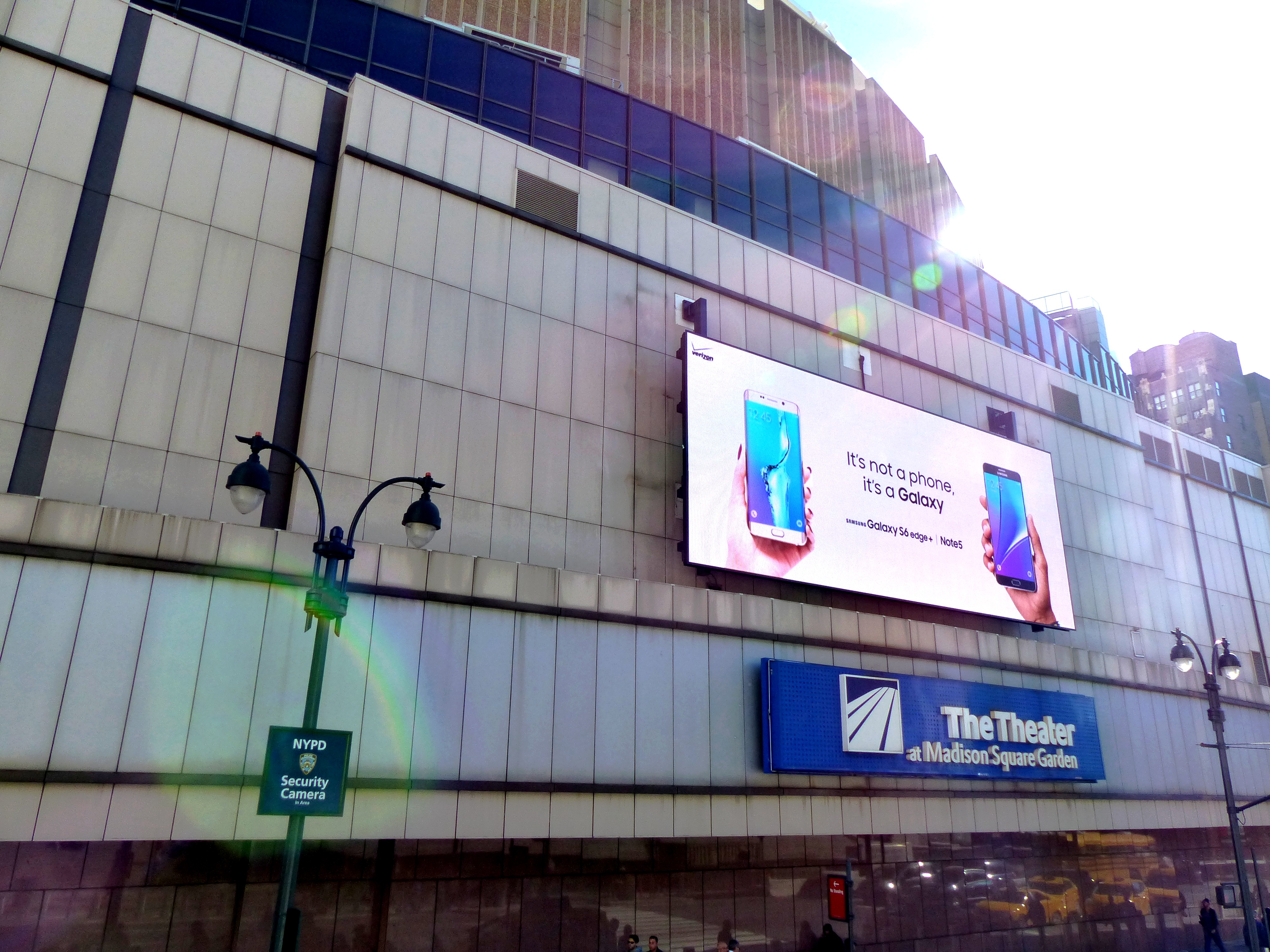
View of the theater in October, 2015

On February 2, 2026, it was announced that Madison Square Garden Entertainment had entered into a naming rights agreement with Infosys, an India-based technology company, to take over the naming rights of the theater, renaming it the Infosys Theater at Madison Square Garden.

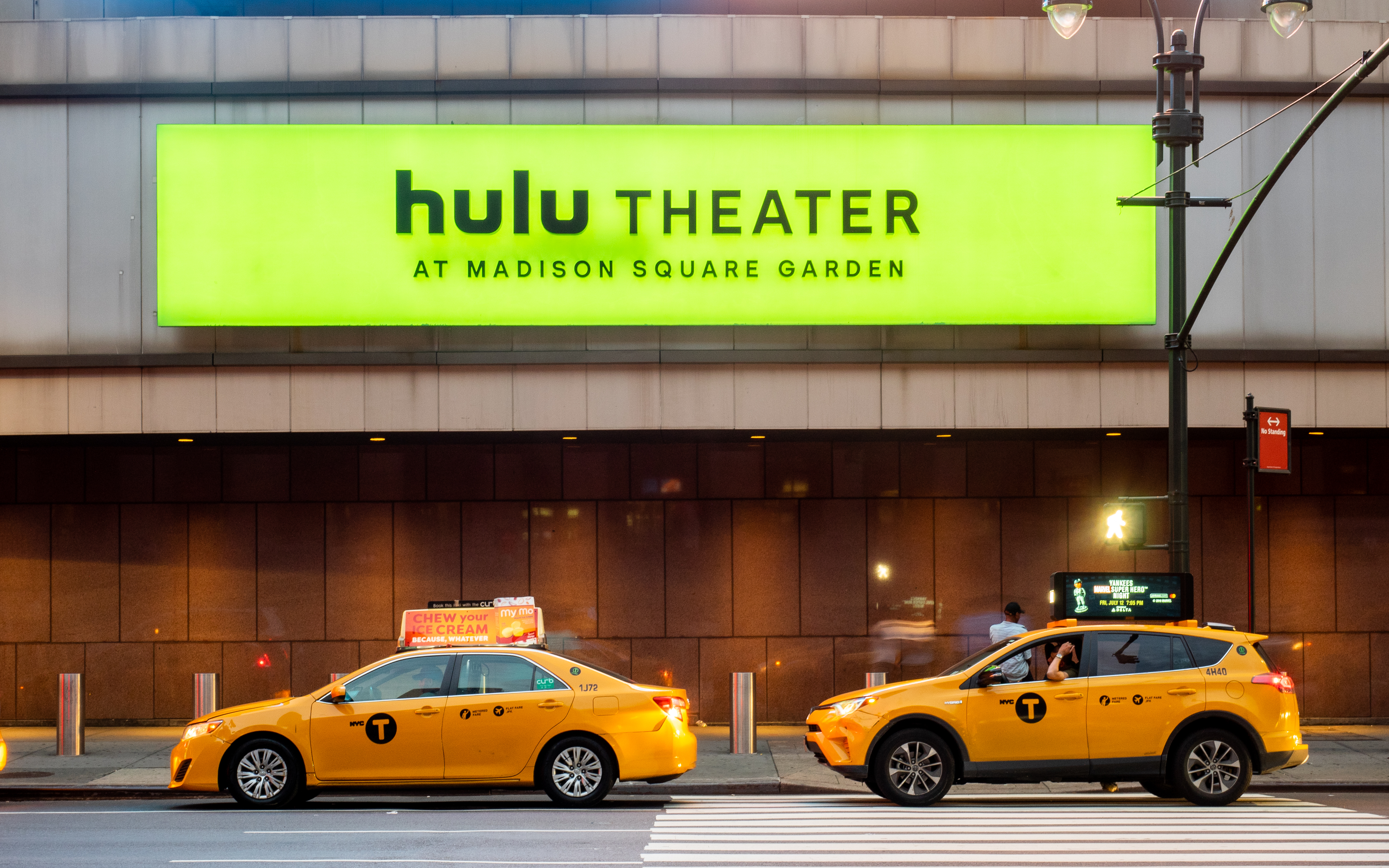
Exterior view in 2019 with the old Hulu branding

In May 2026 a potential revitalization plan for Penn Station was announced that includes building a new entrance to the station along Eighth Avenue. This would require removing the theater to allow for higher ceilings and for natural light to reach the below grade concourse.

== Structure ==
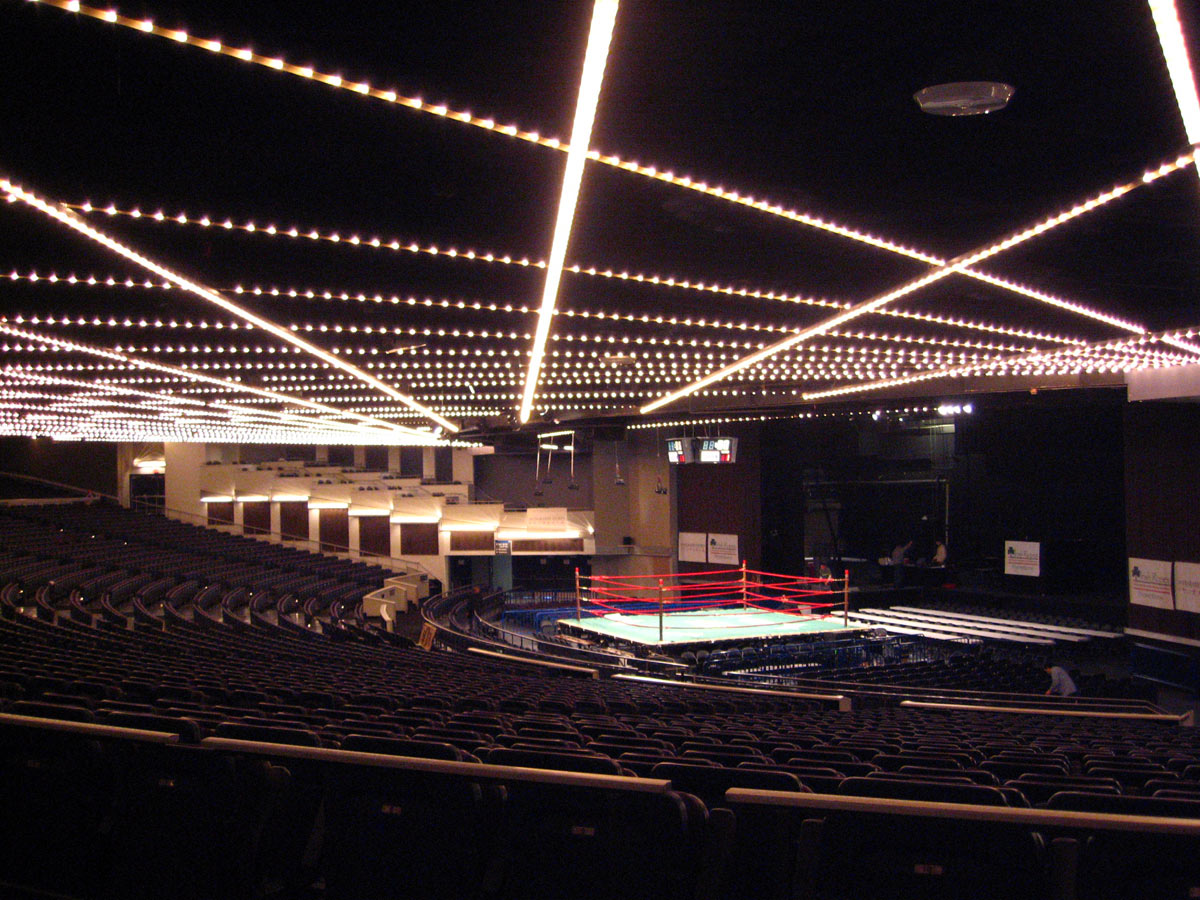
The theater's interior in 2007

No seat is more than 177 feet (54 m) from the 30-by-64-foot (9.1 by 19.5 m) stage. Due to its location beneath the main Madison Square Garden arena, the theater has a relatively low 20-foot (6.1 m) ceiling at stage level. All of its seating except for boxes on the two side walls is on one level slanted back from the stage. There is an 8,000-square-foot (740 m^{2}) lobby at the theater.

== Events ==
It hosted Mike Tyson's fourteenth professional fight against Sammy Scaff on December 6, 1985. The theater occasionally hosts boxing matches on nights when the main arena is unavailable, or fights between promising boxers who management believe will not fill up "the big room". Notable fights include Sergio Martínez vs. Matthew Macklin in 2012, Vasiliy Lomachenko vs. Guillermo Rigondeaux in 2017, and Teófimo López vs. George Kambosos Jr. in 2021.

Most of the tracks for the Doors' album Absolutely Live were taken from the Felt Forum in New York City on January 17 and 18, 1970.

There were many concerts performed at the Felt Forum: in 1971, the Grateful Dead (along with the New RIders of the Purple Sage) had a run from Dec. 4th-7th.

The venue hosted Game 6 of the 1972 ABA Eastern Division Semifinals on April 10 between the New York Nets and the Virginia Squires, as the Nets could not play in their home venue at the Island Garden; the Nets lost 118–114.

On May 28, 1976, a memorial concert was held for singer-songwriter Phil Ochs. The over six-hour concert consisted of performances of Ochs's best known material by many of his peers and influences.

The 1987 stand-up comedy movie Eddie Murphy Raw was filmed at the Felt Forum.

The theater was home to an annual staging of A Christmas Carol from 1994 to 2003. An annual staging of The Wizard of Oz played at the theater from 1997 to 1999. Notable actors in the musical included Roseanne Barr, Eartha Kitt, and Jo Anne Worley as the Wicked Witch of the West; Mickey Rooney as the Wizard, and Ken Page and Lara Teeter as the Cowardly Lion and Scarecrow, respectively.

In 2001, the national tour of Rodgers and Hammerstein's Cinderella starring Jamie-Lynn Sigler in the title role, Eartha Kitt as the Fairy Godmother, and Paolo Montalban as Prince Christopher played at the theater.

In 2003, popular Australian children's group The Wiggles performed a record 12 sold-out shows in a row at the theater, breaking the previous record held by Bruce Springsteen.

In 2005 and 2011, Peter Pan starring Cathy Rigby in the title role returned to New York City at the theater.

From 2004 to 2006 and in 2008 Theatre of MSG hosted the Jammy Award honoring improvisational music.

On November 2, 2024, French-Congolese singer and rapper Gims performed a sold-out, one night only concert at the theater.

The 2024 North American tour of Annie played at the theater from December 4, 2024, through January 5, 2025, with Whoopi Goldberg as Miss Hannigan.

On November 18 and 25, 2025, The venue hosted NXT Gold Rush.

Taiwanese singer Cyndi Wang performed at the theater during her Sugar High World Tour on November 28, 2025. Furthermore, Cyndi Wang is the first Mandopop female singer to perform at The Theater at Madison Square Garden.

It hosted the March 31 episode of WWE's weekly show, NXT.

Preceded by New York Marriott Marquis	Venues of the NFL draft 1995–2004	Succeeded by Jacob K. Javits Convention Center
