= Surfing at the 2019 Pan American Games – Qualification =

The following is the qualification system and qualified athletes for the Surfing at the 2019 Pan American Games competitions.

== Qualification ==
A total of 88 surfers will qualify across various qualification tournaments. The host nation Peru, will be automatically be allocated ten quota spots across the eight events. In the open surf category, a country can enter two athletes, with a maximum one in all other categories. A country can enter a maximum ten surfers (five per gender). An athlete can only qualify one quota for their country.

== Qualification timeline ==
| Events | Date | Venue |
|---|---|---|
| 2018 ISA World Surfing Games | September 15–22, 2018 | (Japan) Tahara |
| 2018 ISA World SUP Championships | November 23 – December 2, 2018 | (China) Riyue Bay |
| ALAS Latin Tour | January – December, 2018 | Various |
| 2018 PASA Surf Games | December 2–9, 2018 | (Peru) Lima |
| 2019 ISA World Longboard Championships | May 26 – June 2, 2019 | (France) Biarritz |

== Qualification summary ==
The following is the qualification summary after the PASA Surf Games.

| Nation | Men | | | | Women | | | | Total |
| Nation | Open surf | SUP surf | SUP race | Longboard | Open surf | SUP surf | SUP race | Longboard | Surfers |
|---|---|---|---|---|---|---|---|---|---|
| Argentina | 2 | 1 | 1 | 1 | 2 | 1 | 1 | 1 | 10 |
| Barbados | | | | | 1 | | | | 1 |
| Brazil | 1 | 1 | 1 | 1 | 1 | 1 | 1 | 1 | 8 |
| Canada | 1 | 1 | 1 | | 1 | 1 | 1 | 1 | 7 |
| Chile | 1 | | | 1 | 1 | | 1 | | 4 |
| Colombia | 1 | 1 | 1 | | 1 | 1 | | | 5 |
| Costa Rica | 2 | | | 1 | | | 1 | 1 | 5 |
| Dominican Republic | | 1 | | | | | | | 1 |
| Ecuador | 1 | | 1 | 1 | 2 | 1 | | 1 | 7 |
| El Salvador | | | | | 1 | 1 | | | 2 |
| Mexico | 1 | | 1 | | 1 | | 1 | 1 | 5 |
| Panama | | | | | 1 | | | | 1 |
| Peru | 2 | 1 | 1 | 1 | 2 | 1 | 1 | 1 | 10 |
| Puerto Rico | 1 | 1 | 1 | 1 | | 1 | 1 | | 6 |
| United States | 1 | 1 | 1 | | 1 | 1 | 1 | 1 | 7 |
| Uruguay | 1 | | | 1 | | | | | 2 |
| Venezuela | 1 | 1 | 1 | | 1 | 1 | | 1 | 6 |
| Total: 17 NOCs | 16 | 9 | 10 | 9 | 16 | 9 | 10 | 9 | 88 |

== Men ==
=== Open surf ===
| Event | Quotas | Qualified |
|---|---|---|
| Host nation | 2 | Peru; Peru |
| ISA World Surfing Games | 2 | United States; Canada |
| PASA Surf Games Top 2 (two per nation) | 4 | Costa Rica; Costa Rica; Argentina; Argentina* |
| PASA Surf Games Ranked 3–8 (one per nation) | 6 | Venezuela; Mexico; Brazil; Ecuador; Chile; Puerto Rico |
| ALAS Latin Tour | 2 | Uruguay; Colombia |
| TOTAL | 16 | |

- Argentina was one of the two nations to qualify through the Worlds, however later the country qualified two slots at the PASA Surf Games, meaning this spot was reallocated to the next best nation, Canada.

=== SUP surf ===
| Event | Quotas | Qualified |
|---|---|---|
| Host nation | 1 | Peru |
| ISA World SUP Championships | 1 | Brazil |
| PASA Surf Games | 7 | Colombia; Canada; United States; Puerto Rico; Venezuela; Argentina; Dominican Republic |
| TOTAL | 9 | |

=== SUP race ===
| Event | Quotas | Qualified |
|---|---|---|
| Host nation | 1 | Peru |
| ISA World SUP Championships | 1 | United States |
| PASA Surf Games | 8 | Brazil; Colombia; Argentina; Mexico; Ecuador; Canada; Puerto Rico; Venezuela |
| TOTAL | 10 | |

- APP Sup World Tour spot was reallocated to the best ranked athlete not qualified from the PASA Surf Games

=== Longboard ===
| Event | Quotas | Qualified |
|---|---|---|
| Host nation | 1 | Peru |
| PASA Surf Games | 7 | Argentina; Brazil; Uruguay; Puerto Rico; Costa Rica; Chile; Ecuador |
| ISA World Longboard Championships | 1 | |
| TOTAL | 9 | |

== Women ==
=== Open ===
| Event | Quotas | Qualified |
|---|---|---|
| Host nation | 2 | Peru; Peru |
| ISA World Surfing Games | 2 | United States; Canada |
| PASA Surf Games Top 2 (two per nation) | ~~4~~ 2 | ~~Costa Rica~~; ~~Costa Rica~~; Ecuador; Ecuador |
| PASA Surf Games Ranked 3–8 (one per nation) | ~~6~~ 5 | Barbados; Chile; Venezuela; ~~Puerto Rico~~; Argentina; Mexico |
| ALAS Latin Tour | 2 | Brazil; El Salvador |
| Reallocation | 3 | Argentina; Colombia; Panama |
| TOTAL | 16 | |

=== SUP surf ===
| Event | Quotas | Qualified |
|---|---|---|
| Host nation | 1 | Peru |
| ISA World SUP Championships | 1 | United States |
| PASA Surf Games | 7 | Colombia; Brazil; El Salvador; Puerto Rico; Argentina; Ecuador; Canada |
| TOTAL | 9 | |

=== SUP race ===
| Event | Quotas | Qualified |
|---|---|---|
| Host nation | 1 | Peru |
| ISA World SUP Championships | 1 | United States |
| PASA Surf Games | 8 | Puerto Rico; Canada; Brazil; Argentina; Costa Rica; Mexico; Chile; Venezuela |
| TOTAL | 10 | |

- APP Sup World Tour spot was reallocated to the best ranked athlete not qualified from the PASA Surf Games

=== Longboard ===
| Event | Quotas | Qualified |
|---|---|---|
| Host nation | 1 | Peru |
| PASA Surf Games | 7 | Brazil; Costa Rica; Argentina; Canada; Mexico; United States; Ecuador |
| ISA World Longboard Championships | 1 | Venezuela |
| TOTAL | 9 | |
