= Nicholas Teo =

Malaysian Chinese singer (born 1981)

- 張棟樑
- Born: 29 November 1981 (age 44); Kuching, Sarawak, Malaysia
- Occupations: Singer, actor
- Years active: 2004–present
- Awards: MTV Asia Awards – Favourite Artist, Malaysia (2008)
- Musical career
- Origin: Malaysia
- Genre: Mandopop
- Labels: Red Bean Entertainment (2018); Universal Music (Hong Kong, Taiwan, Singapore & Malaysia, 2015–2017); Seed Music (Taiwan, 2011–2013); EQ Music (Singapore & Malaysia, 2011); Emperor Entertainment (Hong Kong, 2012–2013); BMA Entertainment (Hong Kong, 2011–2012); Warner Music (Hong Kong & Taiwan, 2009–2010, Singapore & Malaysia, 2004–2010); Gold Typhoon, Virgin Records (2005–2008); Music Street (2003–2004)

Chinese name
- Traditional Chinese: 張棟樑
- Simplified Chinese: 张栋梁
Transcriptions
Standard Mandarin
- Hanyu Pinyin: Zhāng Dòngliáng
Yue: Cantonese
- Jyutping: Zoeng1 Dung3 Loeng4
Southern Min
- Hokkien POJ: Tiuⁿ Tàng-niû
- Website: facebook.com/onlynicholas

Nicholas Teo (Chinese: 張棟樑; pinyin: Zhāng Dòngliáng; Jyutping: Zoeng1 Dung3 Loeng4; Pe̍h-ōe-jī: Tiuⁿ Tàng-niû; born 29 November 1981) is a Malaysian Chinese singer under Good Tengz Entertainment Sdn Bhd. (Malaysia)

== Career ==
=== Pre debut ===
Before returning to Malaysia, Nicholas was studying in Taiwan, where he won the Best Singer in a competition among all the Taiwan universities. Thereafter, he was approached and asked if he would sign up with a company as a back-up singer (backing vocalist, to harmonise with the lead vocalist), which Nicholas subsequently ignored. He returned to Malaysia without finishing his studies and participated in the singing competition "2002 Astro Talent Quest". Nicholas won first place with the song 黃昏 (Huáng Hūn), originally sung by Zhou Chuan Xiong. This led to Nicholas signing a contract in Taiwan with Music Street in 2003.

=== 2004–2014 ===
On 18 June 2004 he released his first album 首選張棟樑 (“1st Choice Nicholas”). Music Street eventually merged with Warner Music. Play Music is a record label subsidiary of Singaporean company Musicstreet Pte Ltd. In 2006, Nicholas received the 2006 Hito Newcomer Award in Taiwan. He also successfully completed his From Now On Concert Tour covering stops in Malaysia, Singapore and Indonesia within the first half-year of 2008. The Malaysian government appointed Teo Penang's 'green ambassador' to spread awareness on environmental issues.

=== 2015-Present ===
On 7 August 2015, Nicholas came back from his "Long Vacation" after 8 months of continuous filming his idol dramas, "K Song Lover" and "Lady Maid Maid". As his management contract came to an end, he decided to have a short break from his work which he never had before. He went to New York for acting lessons for three months during his vacation. He released a new book, featuring his new mini album, "Long Vacation".

== Discography ==
=== Albums ===
Year	Title
2004	1st Choice Nicholas 首選張棟樑
2005	Nicholas 張棟樑首張同名專輯 (Taiwan Version)
2006	Only Nicholas 主打張棟樑
2007	Prince Nicholas 王子
2008	From Now On New Songs + Best Selection 新歌+精选
2009	The Moment of Silence 沉默的瞬間
2011	Let's Not Fall in Love Again 别再惊动爱情
2024	White Night+ 白夜克拉克+

=== EP ===
Year	Title
2003	Nicholas Teo First EP (Malaysia Only)
2005	Dearly Love You EP 只在乎你 EP (Malaysia Only)
2015	To Be Nicholas Teo 怎樣的張棟樑
2018	The Best is Yet to Come 最好的快要發生

=== OST ===
- Smiling Pasta OST 微笑PASTA電視原聲帶 (2006)
- Invincible Shan Bao Mei OST (2008)

== Filmography ==
=== Television series ===
Year	Title	Role
2006	微笑Pasta / Smiling Pasta	He Qun (何群)
2008	無敵珊寶妹 / Invincible Shan Bao Mei	Sun Wu Di (孫無敵)
2010	女王不下班 / Four Gifts	Ren Shao Ting (任少廷)
2012	愛情女僕 / Lady Maid Maid	Gao Xiao-jie (高孝介)
2013	K歌情人夢 / K Song Lover	Gu Hao Yu (谷皓宇)
2015	愛情有沒友 星座愛情水瓶女 / AQUARIUS	Wan Hong Zhi (萬弘志)
2019	一千個晚安 / A Thousand Goodnights	Cheng Nuo (程諾)

=== Movies ===
Year	Title	Role	Notes
2006	第三代 / Third Generation	Chen Li (陈利)	–
2007	料理鼠王 / Ratatouille	Linguini (小林/林葛尼 )	Voice for Mandarin release
2009	爱在首尔 / Love in Seoul (Travelogue)	Himself	Short film
2010	初戀紅豆冰 / Ice Kachang Puppy Love	Passerby	–
2012	曖 / Warm	Mickey (米奇)	Short Film
2012	陪伴 / Companionship	Guang Zhi (廣植)	Short Film
2018	為你寫詩 / Crazy Little Things	Himself	–

== Tours ==
Chapter 21 World Tour
Date	City	Country	Venue	Special guest(s)
25 November 2023	Shenzhen	China	Futian Sports Park	
9 December 2023	Chengdu	China	Huaxi LIVE – 528 M Space	
23 December 2023	Shanghai	China	Jing'an Sports Center	
30 November 2024	Guangzhou	China	Guangzhou Asian Games Town Gymnasium	
14 June 2025	Singapore		Sands Expo & Convention Centre	
9 August 2025	Wuhan	China	Wuhan Five Rings Sports Center	
16 August 2025	Suzhou	China	Suzhou Sports Center	
20 September 2025	Kuala Lumpur	Malaysia	Axiata Arena	
10 January 2026	Kaohsiung	Taiwan	Kaohsiung Music Center	
28 February 2026	Macau		The Londoner Arena	

Eye of The Storm
Date	City	Country	Venue	Special guest(s)
28 November 2026	Foshan	China	Foshan Lingnan Pearl Gymnasium	
12 December 2026	Wuxi	China	Wuxi Sports Center Gymnasium	

== Nominations ==
- MTV Asia Awards – Favourite Artiste Malaysia (2008)
- 2008 TVB8 Golden Chart Awards – Most Popular Male Singer, Gold Song (Xin Ge Shi Chang), Mainland's Most-Loved Male Singer
- 2008 PWH Awards Malaysia
- 2016 Global Chinese Awards in Beijing
- 2018 AIM Chinese Awards Malaysia

== Awards ==
- TVB8 Best New Talent Artiste – Gold Award (2003)
- Global Chinese Music Award – Best Newcomer (2005)
- Singapore Hit Award – Best New Act (2005)
- HITO Newcomer Award (2006)
- Malaysia PWH Award (2006)
- Malaysia Didadee Hits Award – Most Popular Chinese Singer (2007)
- Red Box Karaoke Annual K-Songs Top 20 (2007)
- 1st Kiss Apple Love Song Chart Award (2008)
- Malaysia Leaping Youth Most Yeah! Award (2008)

Readers' Favourite Hit Songs – "Prince" & "Try Singing a New Song" + Readers' Most-Loved Best Local Male Singer(Gold) 2008

- MTV Asia Favourite Artiste Malaysia Award (2008)
- 現場投選最受歡迎原唱歌手獎 [娛協獎2008] (2008)
- 2009 Annual Kiss Apple Top 10 Love Songs Chart – Winning Song "Ji Mo Na Me Duo" (Taiwan)
- 2009 Metro Mandarin Power Awards – Most Improved Singer and Asia's Popular Idol (Hong Kong)
- 2016 Global Melody Awards in Beijing Top 20 Songs of the Year - "There's No If" and "Most Recommended Malaysian Artiste"
- 2016 Sept - Malaysia AIM Chinese Awards - 7 Awards archived in the awards.
- 2018 May - Malaysia PWH Awards (Organised by Chinese Media) - The Most Recommended Singer of the year, the best song of the year & The best EP of the year.
- 2020 Jan - Malaysia AIM Chinese Awards - The Best Productions of "The Best Is Yet To Come".

== Trivia ==
- Although he is Chinese-Malaysian, it is said that his smile looks like that of Korean star Kim Jaewon. He is often mistaken for him.
- Amber Kuo is one of the female actress/singer that works with him in the drama, Invincible Shan Bao Mei
- Cyndi Wang is one of the female actress/singer that works with him. She plays the leads in both his drama (Smiling Pasta, 2006) and animation film (Ratatouille, 2007) debuts.
- He is currently rumoured to be with Cyndi Wang, after the two surprisingly showed up at each other's autograph sessions. Cyndi Wang showed up at his latest album Prince Nicholas' press conference, presenting him a glass slipper, which he later helped her put on. He also showed up at Cyndi Wang's latest album Magic Cyndi's autograph session and presented her with a love amulet.
- Nicholas used to attend piano lessons when small as a result of encouragement from his supportive mother. Unfortunately, he gave up later. The thought of performing the instrument again occurred to him while planning special segments for his Fisherman's Pier Celebration Concert in Taiwan(2007). Although time constraint prevented such idea to come to fruition, Nicholas hoped that there will still be possible chances for him to do so in future.
- Fish Leong and Nicholas are very good friends as both hail from the same country, Malaysia, and have their careers currently based in Taiwan. They were rumoured to be together shortly before Nicholas' first major concert in Kuala Lumpur. Although he prefers to look up to her as his senior in the music industry, Nicholas does not completely dismiss the idea that their relationship can progress beyond that of friendship one day.
- During Smiling Pasta Promo, Cyndi Wang announce publicly that Nicholas is "skillful with his tongue" when kissing.
- Album name: Wangzi

== Related artists/bands ==
- Cui Jian
- Dou Wei
- Tang Dynasty (band)
