= The 10th Cyndi =

2014 album by Cyndi Wang

Studio album by Cyndi Wang
- Released: July 25, 2014
- Genre: Pop
- Length: 39:19
- Label: Universal Music

Cyndi Wang chronology
Love? Or Not? (2012)	The 10th Cyndi (2014)	Cyndi Wants or Not? (2015)

Alternative cover

Singles from The 10th Cyndi
- 1. "Baby Boy" Released: June 25, 2014; 2. "Chen Shu Fen & Lin Zhi Hao" Released: July 22, 2014; 3. "A Place I've Never Been" Released: October 8, 2014

The 10th Cyndi (traditional Chinese: 第十個王心凌; simplified Chinese: 第十个王心凌; pinyin: Dì Shí Gè Wáng Xīn Líng) is the tenth studio album by Taiwanese recording artist Cyndi Wang, released on July 25, 2014, by Universal Music Taiwan.

== Background ==
The 10th Cyndi is themed around ten different faces and angles of herself. The lead single "Baby Boy" premiered on radio stations in Taiwan and Asia on June 25, 2014. The music videos for the singles "Chen Shu Fen & Lin Zhi Hao" and "A Place I've Never Been" were uploaded on July 22 and October 8, 2014, respectively. It debuted and peaked at number one on the G-Music combo album chart in Taiwan during the week ending on July 31, 2014, counting for 17% of the week's total album sales.

== Track listing ==
The 10th Cyndi track listing
No.	Title	Lyrics	Music	Length
1.	"Angel's Paranoid" (天使的偏執)	Neal Wu	Khalil Fong	4:22
2.	"Baby Boy"	Luke "Skywalker" Tsui	Kwon Ki Myoung	3:15
3.	"How's Love?" (愛呢？)	Alang Huang	Xiao Yu	4:11
4.	"Chen Shu Fen & Lin Zhi Hao" (陳淑芬與林志豪)	Kuan Chi Yuan	Sung Shih-Yao	3:49
5.	"Yesterday, Today" (昨天、今天)	Neal Wu	Tang Xiang-Zhi	3:33
6.	"Indescribable Flavor" (說不出的味道)	Cola Chen; Wu Yi-Wei	Cola Chen	4:13
7.	"Lonely Carnival" (孤獨的嘉年華會)	Hsiang Yueh-E	Terence Leong; Kimberley Chen	4:24
8.	"Bump 'n' Bump" (碰碰)	Cola Chen	Paul Drew; Greig Watts; Pete Barringer; Christopher Wortley	3:24
9.	"Double Happiness" (兩人份的幸福)	Justin Chen	Justin Chen	4:15
10.	"A Place I've Never Been" (從未到過的地方)	Greeny Wu	Greeny Wu	3:53
Total length:				39:19

== Charts ==
Chart performance for The 10th Cyndi
Chart (2014)	Peak position
Taiwanese Albums (G-Music)	1

== Release history ==
Release history for The 10th Cyndi
Region	Date	Format(s)	Version	Label
Various	July 25, 2014	CD; digital download; streaming	Standard edition	Universal Music Taiwan
Taiwan	July 25, 2014	CD	Fashionable Sports edition	Universal Music Taiwan
Taiwan	July 25, 2014	CD	So Dance edition	Universal Music Taiwan
Taiwan	September 23, 2014	CD	Brilliant Gold edition (Celebration edition)	Universal Music Taiwan
