= Invincible Shan Bao Mei =

2008 Taiwanese television series

- Promotional poster
- Also known as: I Love Shan Bao Mei
- Genre: Romance; Comedy
- Starring: Nicholas Teo; Amber Kuo; Roy Chiu; Hong Xiao Ling
- Opening theme: "情花開" (Love in Bloom) by Nicholas Teo
- Ending theme: "L.O.V.E." by Amber Kuo and Wang Yi Fei
- Country of origin: Taiwan
- Original language: Mandarin
- No. of episodes: 19 episodes

Production
- Executive producers: Chen Yu Shan, Chen Yi Jun
- Production location: Taiwan

Original release
- Network: TTV/Sanlih E-Television
- Release: 24 August – 28 December 2008

Related
- Fated to Love You; My Queen

Invincible Shan Bao Mei (Chinese: 無敵珊寶妹; pinyin: Wúdí shān bǎo mèi) is a 2008 Taiwanese romantic comedy drama series starring Nicholas Teo and Amber Kuo. It premiered on August 24, 2008, following the conclusion of Fated to Love You. The series reached a peak rating of 10.57, occurring during the commercial-free transition from Fated to Love You to Invincible Shan Bao Mei. Its first episode had an average rating of 7.25.

== Plot ==
Having been kidnapped as a child along with his father, Sun Wu Di (Nicholas Teo) finds it difficult to trust others as an adult, despite having a girlfriend, Zu An (Hong Xiao Ling). He has a high opinion of himself and a low opinion of those around him. His world, centered on himself and his distrust of others, is turned upside down when he meets a girl named Hu Shan Bao (Amber Kuo).

== Cast ==
- Nicholas Teo as Sun Wu Di (孫無敵)
- Amber Kuo as Hu Shan Bao (胡珊寶)
- Roy Chiu as Zhang Wei Qing (張唯青)
- Hong Xiao Ling as Ji Zu An (紀祖安) (Sun Wu Di's girlfriend)
- Wang Yi Fei (黃一飛) as Hu Guang (胡廣) (Shan Bao's father)
- Liang He Qun (梁赫群) as Hu Da Dao (胡大刀) (Shan Bao's brother)
- George Zhang (張兆志) as Xiao Sa Ge (瀟灑哥)
- Chung Hsin-ling as Chi Xin Jie (癡心姐)
- Guan Yong (關勇) as Ji Da Wei (紀大偉)
- Tony Fish (余炳賢) as A Xiang (阿牆)
- Chen Han-dian (陳漢典) as Kai Wen (凱文)
- Zhao Zheng Ping (趙正平) as Kidnapper
- Lin Zhi Yan (林智賢) as Kidnapper
- Ethan Juan as Ji Cun Xi (紀存希) (ep 1&2)
- Joe Chen as Chen Xin Yi (陳欣怡) (ep 2)
- Na Wei Xun as Anson (ep 1)
- Jessica Song (宋新妮) as Chen Qing Xia (陳青霞) (ep 1)

== Production ==
Following the success of Fated to Love You, Invincible Shan Bao Mei was launched as its successor. During their guest appearance, Chen Qiao En and Ethan Juan reprise their roles from Fated to Love You as Chen Xin Yi and Ji Cun Xi respectively, as do Na Wei Xun, who plays Anson, and Jessica Song, as Chen Xin Yi's eldest sister Chen Qing Xia.

== Episode Ratings ==
| First Broadcast | Episode | Nationwide | Rank | Peak Point |
| 2008/08/24 | 1st Dish | 7.25 | 2 | 10.57 |
| 2008/08/31 | 2nd Dish | 4.81 | 1 | 5.37 |
| 2008/09/07 | 3rd Dish | 3.69 | 1 | 4.88 |
| 2008/09/14 | 4th Dish | 3.53 | 1 | |
| 2008/09/21 | 5th Dish | 2.95 | 1 | |
| 2008/09/28 | 6th Dish | 3.96 | 1 | |
| 2008/10/05 | 7th Dish | 3.08 | 1 | |
| 2008/10/12 | 8th Dish | 2.87 | 1 | |
| 2008/10/19 | 9th Dish | 2.84 | 1 | |
| 2008/10/26 | 10th Dish | 2.52 | 2 | 3.02 |
| 2008/11/02 | 11th Dish | 2.72 | 1 | 3.42 |
| 2008/11/09 | 12th Dish | 2.93 | 1 | 3.61 |
| 2008/11/16 | 13th Dish | 2.72 | 2 | 4.13 |
| 2008/11/23 | 14th Dish | 2.39 | 1 | |
| 2008/11/30 | 15th Dish | 2.20 | 2 | |
| 2008/12/07 | 16th Dish | 2.22 | 2 | |
| 2008/12/14 | 17th Dish | 2.33 | 1 | |
| 2008/12/21 | 18th Dish | 2.64 | 1 | |
| 2008/12/29 | 19th Dish | 3.48 | 1 | 4.52 |
| Average Rating | | | 3.22 | 1 |

Source: Chinatimes Showbiz

== See also ==
- Fated to Love You
