= Sugar High World Tour =

2023–2026 concert tour by Cyndi Wang

- Tour by Cyndi Wang
- Location: Asia; North America
- Associated album: Bite Back
- Start date: September 23, 2023
- End date: January 24, 2026
- No. of shows: 79

Cyndi Wang concert chronology
- Cyndiloves2sing Live Tour (2019–2022); Sugar High World Tour (2023–2026)

Sugar High World Tour (Chinese: Sugar High 世界巡迴演唱會) is the third concert tour by Taiwanese singer Cyndi Wang, held in support of her thirteenth studio album Bite Back (2023). The tour began in Taipei at the Taipei Arena on September 23, 2023. An extension of the tour titled "Sugar High 2.0" began on October 12, 2024, and has been expanded into North America.

== Background ==
Cyndi Wang held her third concert tour, Sugar High World Tour on the twentieth anniversary of her debut. On August 28, 2023, Cyndi Wang announced the 5 Sugar Monster mascots of her world tour – Crown, Heart, Earth, Sugar and Dragon.

On September 24, 2023, Cyndi Wang released the concert theme song "Sugar High". The tour began in Taipei at the Taipei Arena on September 23, 2023. On April 6, 2024, the tour was upgraded to a 1.5 version with the concert in Beijing; most of the costumes, the set list, and the stage lighting had been changed. An extension of the tour, titled Sugar High 2.0, commenced in Taipei on October 12, 2024.

== Commercial performance ==
The first shows held at the Taipei Arena in September 2023 attracted a total of 22,000 people and generated NT$55 million (US$1.67 million) in revenue.

== Set list ==
The following set list is from the concert on September 23–24, 2023, in Taipei, Taiwan. It is not intended to represent all shows throughout the tour.

1. "Bite Back"
2. "Baby Boy"
3. "Woosa Woosa"
4. "Honey"
5. "Dusk Dawn"
6. "Seven Minutes Before Sunset"
7. "In the Cafe Where Youth is Lost"
8. "Sticky"
9. "Love Space"
10. "Don't Cry"
11. "I Will Be Fine"
12. "The Thunder That Will Strike You is On the Way"
13. "Let's Go to Happiness"
14. "2005 Moonlight Shining"
15. "Sugar High"
16. "The Cat Who Taught the Seagulls to Fly"
17. "What if I Like You?"
18. "Love You"
19. "That Summer, the Quiet Sea"
20. "Sleep"
21. "I'm Fine, How About You?"
22. "Becoming a Stranger"
23. "This is Love"
24. "Da Da Da" (Fans KTV)
25. "Curly Eyelashes"
26. "Heart to Heart"
27. "Rainbow Smile"
28. "When You"
29. "Lovelorn Fans Party" / "Behind Happiness" / "The First Love" / "Little Star"

== Tour dates ==
List of Sugar High World Tour dates
Date	City	Country	Venue	Attendance
September 23, 2023	Taipei	Taiwan	Taipei Arena	22,000
September 24, 2023	Taipei	Taiwan	Taipei Arena	22,000
October 14, 2023	Shanghai	China	Mercedes-Benz Arena	—
October 21, 2023	Wuxi	China	Wuxi Sports Center	—
October 28, 2023	Fuzhou	China	Haixia Olympic Center	—
November 4, 2023	Guangzhou	China	Guangzhou Gymnasium	—
November 11, 2023	Zhengzhou	China	Zhengzhou Olympic Sports Center	—
December 2, 2023	Chongqing	China	Chongqing International Expo Center	—
December 9, 2023	Nanchang	China	Nanchang International Stadium	—
December 16, 2023	Xi'an	China	Xi'an Olympic Sports Center	—
December 23, 2023	Chengdu	China	Chengdu Financial City Performing Center	10,000
January 6, 2024	Dalian	China	Dalian Sports Centre Stadium	—
January 13, 2024	Shenzhen	China	Shenzhen Bay Sports Center	—
January 20, 2024	Hefei	China	Hefei Binhu Int'l Convention & Exhibition Center	—
January 27, 2024	Suzhou	China	Suzhou Olympic Sports Centre	—
March 9, 2024	Quanzhou	China	Quanzhou Jinjiang Sports Center	—
March 22, 2024	Genting Highlands	Malaysia	Arena of Stars	—
March 23, 2024	Genting Highlands	Malaysia	Arena of Stars	—
March 30, 2024	Macau	China	Galaxy Arena	—
April 6, 2024	Beijing	China	National Indoor Stadium	—
April 7, 2024	Beijing	China	National Indoor Stadium	—
April 13, 2024	Tianjin	China	Tianjin Gymnasium	—
April 20, 2024	Nanjing	China	Nanjing Olympic Sports Center Gymnasium	—
April 27, 2024	Jinan	China	Jinan Olympic Sports Center Gymnasium	—
May 4, 2024	Wuhan	China	Wuhan Sports Center Gymnasium	10,000
May 11, 2024	Ningbo	China	Ningbo Olympic Sports Center Gymnasium	—
May 18, 2024	Foshan	China	Foshan Int'l Sports Culture	—
June 1, 2024	Hangzhou	China	Hangzhou OSC Gymnasium	—
June 9, 2024	Xiamen	China	Xiamen OSC Gymnasium	—
June 15, 2024	Changsha	China	Hunan Int'l Convention & Exhibition Center	—
June 22, 2024	Xiamen	China	Shanxi Sports Center Gymnasium	—
June 29, 2024	Qingdao	China	Qingdao Citizen Fitness Center Gymnasium	—

List of Sugar High 2.0 World Tour dates
Date	City	Country	Venue	Attendance
October 12, 2024	Taipei	Taiwan	Taipei Arena	—
October 13, 2024	Taipei	Taiwan	Taipei Arena	—
December 21, 2024	Shanghai	China	Mercedes-Benz Arena	—
December 22, 2024	Shanghai	China	Mercedes-Benz Arena	—
January 11, 2025	Nanjing	China	Nanjing Youth Olympic Sports Park Stadium	—
January 12, 2025	Nanjing	China	Nanjing Youth Olympic Sports Park Stadium	—
February 14, 2025	Chongqing	China	Huaxi Culture and Sports Center	—
February 15, 2025	Chongqing	China	Huaxi Culture and Sports Center	—
February 21, 2025	Ningbo	China	Ningbo Olympic Sports Center Gymnasium	—
February 22, 2025	Ningbo	China	Ningbo Olympic Sports Center Gymnasium	—
March 15, 2025	Chengdu	China	Wuliangye Cultural and Sports Center	—
March 16, 2025	Chengdu	China	Wuliangye Cultural and Sports Center	—
March 29, 2025	Guangzhou	China	Guangzhou International Sports Arena	—
March 30, 2025	Guangzhou	China	Guangzhou International Sports Arena	—
April 5, 2025	Quanzhou	China	Jinjiang Second Sports Center	—
April 6, 2025	Quanzhou	China	Jinjiang Second Sports Center	—
April 19, 2025	Hefei	China	Shaoquan Sports Center	—
April 20, 2025	Hefei	China	Shaoquan Sports Center	—
May 3, 2025	Nanchang	China	Nanchang International Sports Center Gymnasium	—
May 4, 2025	Nanchang	China	Nanchang International Sports Center Gymnasium	—
May 17, 2025	Shenzhen	China	Shenzhen Sports Center Gymnasium	—
May 18, 2025	Shenzhen	China	Shenzhen Sports Center Gymnasium	—
May 30, 2025	Suzhou	China	Suzhou Olympic Sports Centre Gymnasium	—
May 31, 2025	Suzhou	China	Suzhou Olympic Sports Centre Gymnasium	—
June 14, 2025	Zhengzhou	China	Zhengzhou Olympic Sports Center Gymnasium	—
June 15, 2025	Zhengzhou	China	Zhengzhou Olympic Sports Center Gymnasium	—
June 21, 2025	Hangzhou	China	Hangzhou Olympic Sports Center Gymnasium	—
June 22, 2025	Hangzhou	China	Hangzhou Olympic Sports Center Gymnasium	—
July 5, 2025	Xiamen	China	Xiamen Olympic Sports Center Phoenix Stadium	—
July 6, 2025	Xiamen	China	Xiamen Olympic Sports Center Phoenix Stadium	—
July 19, 2025	Xi'an	China	Xi'an Olympic Sports Center Gymnasium	—
July 20, 2025	Xi'an	China	Xi'an Olympic Sports Center Gymnasium	—
August 15, 2025	Beijing	China	Wukesong Arena	—
August 16, 2025	Beijing	China	Wukesong Arena	—
August 17, 2025	Beijing	China	Wukesong Arena	—
November 22, 2025	Oakland (Note: Labeled as San Francisco in promotional material.)	United States	Oakland Arena	—
November 28, 2025	New York City	United States	The Theater at Madison Square Garden	—
January 23, 2026	Taipei	Taiwan	Taipei Arena	—
January 24, 2026	Taipei	Taiwan	Taipei Arena	—
Total				N/A
