= Cyndi Wants! World Tour =

2016–2017 concert tour by Cyndi Wang

- Tour by Cyndi Wang
- Location: Asia
- Associated album: Cyndi Wants or Not?
- Start date: January 2, 2016
- End date: September 23, 2017
- No. of shows: 5

Cyndi Wang concert chronology
- Cyndi Wants! World Tour (2016–2017); Cyndiloves2sing Live Tour (2019–2022)

Cyndi Wants! World Tour (Chinese: Cyndi Wants! 世界巡迴演唱會) is the first concert tour by Taiwanese singer Cyndi Wang, held in support of her eleventh studio album Cyndi Wants or Not? (2015). The tour began in Taipei at the Taipei Arena on January 2, 2016.

== Tour Dates ==
Date	City	Country	Venue
January 2, 2016	Taipei	Taiwan	Taipei Arena
May 20, 2017	Hangzhou	China	Hangzhou Gymnasium
July 9, 2017	Chengdu	China	Qingshuihe Campus Gymnasium
July 23, 2017	Nanjing	China	Nanjing Olympic Sports Center Gymnasium
September 23, 2017	Shenzhen	China	Shenzhen Bay Sports Center
