= Baoji City Stadium =

Sports venue in Baoji, China

- Interactive map of Baoji City Stadium
- Location: Baoji, China PR
- Coordinates: 34.353020°N 107.146761°E
- Capacity: 27,000

The Baoji City Stadium (Chinese: 宝鸡体育场) Baoji, China. It is currently used mostly for football matches. The stadium holds 27,000 spectators.
