= Percy Phang =

Percy Phang (彭學斌) is a Malaysian musician, songwriter, producer in the Chinese music industry.

== Early life ==
=== Student life ===
The Phang family had its ancestry from Haifeng County in Guangdong, and Percy was raised in Malaysia. Having attended Chinese schools from elementary all the way to middle school, Mandarin Chinese served as the main language throughout his education. In 1982 when Percy was in Grade 6, he and a group of Singaporean children actors recorded two children songs’ albums, “Cai Dui Le 猜對了” and “You Jiao Er Ge幼教兒歌”, published by Song Cing Record. Percy started his first attempts of songwriting as early as middle school, and his earlier works “Qi憩” and “Shi Tou Ji Bian Zou Cyu 石頭記變奏曲” was first performed in a songwriting concert at Foon Yew High School in Malaysia in 1987. Percy has continued to participate in other songwriting events in Johor Bahru including “Sui Zu隨族” and “Wo Men De Ge 我們的歌” Concerts.

Percy went to Taiwan for his undergraduate degree at National Chengchi University (NCCU) in the Department of Journalism. He had participated in numerous songwriting contests, including “NCCU’s Golden Melody 政大金旋獎”, “Da Xue Cheng National Universities Songs Producing Competition 大學城全國大專創作歌謠賽”, “Mu Chuan Folk Songs Competition 木船民歌大賽”, “Universities Folk Songs Competition in Northern Region北區大專民歌比賽”, “Qing Yin Awards淡江大學青音獎”, etc. While at school, he also recorded an original album with his classmates “Yin Yue Ma Si Tuan音樂馬戲團”, and made musical arrangements for gospel singer Ya Ge's album “Yin Xuan Xin Yun吟萱心韻”.

=== Early Influences ===
Percy's received musical influences partially from 80's Taiwanese pop songs, and partially from 80's Cantonese and Western pop music. In elementary school, he had listened to a lot of covers of Taiwan folk songs by Taiwanese, Singaporean or Malaysian singers. Starting from middle school, Percy had a great exposure to both Chinese and English pop songs in the 80's. On top of Rock Records and UFO Records from Taiwan, and music by Hong Kong singers like Alan Tam, Danny Chan, Chelsia Chau Ha Chan, and Anita Mui, Percy is also following western charts like the US Billboard and UK Cashbox.

== Career ==
=== Early career ===
Percy was first spotted by producer Preston Lee, who served as the panel judge at NCCU's Golden Melody. Referred by Preston Lee, Percy entered the record company Music Impact Entertainment Ltd. as the Assistant Producer upon graduating from college. The first pop song he released was “Jia Ru 假如” by Hong Kong singer Gigi Lai, and the first album he produced was “Steven Hao and Fei Fei An郝邵文與肥肥安”.

=== Songwriter and Producer ===
Percy has produced over 100 albums and released over 300 songs. The artists he has worked with include Michael Wong, Yoga Lin, Stefanie Sun, Cheer Chen, Fish Leong, Z Chen, Nicholas Teo, Andrew Tan, etc. On top of that, he also played an important role in supporting Malaysian singers such as Z Chen, Penny Tai, Lawrence Wong, and Morris Pang in entering the greater Asian market.

Since 1995, Percy has released songs for singers like Wallace Chung, Z Chen, Tanya Chua, Gigi Leung, etc. In 2004, he reached a milestone in his career with the song “I Miss Him, Too 我也很想他” by Stefanie Sun. In the following years of 2006 and 2007, Percy released a significant amount of works serving as the singers’ major hits in their albums, including “Love Turns Out To Be Hurting So Much愛情原來那麼傷” by Gigi Leung, “The Tranquil Sea of That Summer那年夏天寧靜的海” by Cyndi Wang, “J’Adore 崇拜” by Fish Leong, etc. His recent hit songs include Z Chen's “Secret Love暗戀”, Evan Yo's “Loneliness寂寞，好了”, Andrew Tan's “Stardom天后”, Yoga Lin's “Admirer伯樂”, etc.

Percy has repeatedly received many awards at Malaysia PWH Music Award and AIM Chinese Music Awards, including “Best Original Creation原創金曲”, “Best Composition最佳作曲”, “Best Album最佳專輯”, “Highest View in Chinese Songs最高點播率中文歌曲”, “Song of Highest Royalties 海外最高版稅歌曲”, etc.

=== Entrepreneurship ===
In 2002, Percy founded Pocket Music, serving as the music coordinator providing services such as song licensing and IP, record productions, TV and commercial music, and other various music production projects. Other than pop music related businesses, Pocket Music also manages music albums of other genres and purposes, like children's songs, cover albums, spiritual and religious music, and special projects like student music albums collaborating with school magazines. Regarding songwriting licensing and IP, Percy is keen on developing talents and providing a platform for songwriters from the new generations.

=== Personal Albums ===
Other than writing and producing songs for other artists, Percy also has his own albums. In 1999, Percy performed the song “Yan 鹽” in the joint album “Huan Ying Guang Lin 歡迎光臨” with other singers, and he released his personal album “Wo Jhao Peng Syue Bin 我找彭學斌” in 2000, and “Dao Ci Yi You到此一遊” in 2015.

Not long after Percy returned to Malaysia, he released his first personal album “Wo Jhao Peng Syue Bin 我找彭學斌”. Later in 2015, “Dao Ci Yi You到此一遊”, an album on Percy's personal reflections was released. The whole album comprises songs written by Percy, lyrics written by chief editor Ming Sin Shen of Fo Guang Publications, and performed by various Malaysian singers. He also performed the song “Zhe Shih Jie Jing De Siang Yi Shou Shi 這世界靜得像一首詩” in the album. The album “Dao Ci Yi You到此一遊” describes ten different opportunities, scenarios, and life stories. Percy hopes that, this album can offer a broader perspective for people to observe and criticize the society, values, life and death, belief, and emotions, especially in the VUCA world we’re facing currently. While making decisions on the copywriting, selection of singers, music style, and target audience, Percy had adopted a unique approach that varies from his songwriting patterns for pop music. He had managed to incorporate deeper elements on belief and life into his music, and manifested the spiritual ideas through his music.

== Artistry ==
=== Working Style ===
In order to focus on his songwriting, Percy keeps a regular work and life schedule. For most of the time, Percy writes songs in the morning. On working days, he goes to work no matter how heavy or little the workload is, and gets off at around 6 or 7 pm. He thinks that a regular schedule and good time management can keep him more focused on his work. In a previous interview, he had described his working style: “Every single day I’ll sit in front of my keyboard. It’s necessary that I always practice for at least four hours a day, whether inspirations hit me or not. I believe it’s very important to stay focused in my job, and a regular schedule is the best way for me. That’s why I rarely stay up when producing music.”

=== Career Aspiration ===
Percy has not had too much thought on what kind of musician he wants to be. What drives him is this pure interest in music and the desire to be in the music industry. While having already achieved certain accomplishments in his career, Percy thinks that his belief and attitude towards music isn't that different from when he just started. He is not that competitive as he believes that all of the works were done for himself but not to prove to anyone. As for the future, Percy hopes to explore China and its opportunities that he wants to spend time to develop more and deeper music collaborations with Chinese artists.

=== Encouragements for New Artists ===
In a previous interview, Percy mentioned personal story in his music career: “There was this certain year that I returned to Malaysia due to unstable income from songwriting. I was helping out in my family owned stationery store. There was this moment that I could never forget. It was a rainy morning with no customers, and I heard “I Miss Him, Too 我也很想他” by Stefanie Sun coming out from the radio. It was the song that I just recently had sold. Then I thought, ‘I can still write! Why don’t I keep trying?’ It wasn't about capabilities, it's just a mental obstacle that haunts you and makes you wonder what is this all for? Percy understands that it was a sad yet hopeful moment in that he is aware that there might be unstable finances, but his passion towards music has surpassed the fear of the unknown. He encourages the songwriters in the new generations “I know it’s a tough time for songwriters now at such a fast-paced era. Many were encouraged to become celebrities on social media, and we might have to do a lot of other things unrelated to music for better sense of security and accomplishment. Although it’s a very different world we’re facing now, Taiwan’s songwriting capability is still there. We still think of Taiwan when we are looking for works with insights and soul. If you are really talented and capable, you need to wait for that opportunity. The global market is tougher to enter, but ultimately it’s about the songwriting and the music itself.”

== Works ==
Phang's representative works over the years include:

Song	Singer
鹽、裙子青蛙	Percy Phang
三十而慄	Yisa Yu
我也很想他	Stefanie Sun
暗戀、金玉良言、相逢恨早、記得是最好的遺忘、淤青	Z Chen
原來愛情這麼傷、口香糖、	Gigi Leung
那年夏天寧靜的海	Cyndi Wang
伯樂	Yoga Lin
橡皮筋崇拜、我就知道那是愛、愛久見人心、秘果	Fish Leong
天后、皮膚	Andrew Tan
見壞就收、順風車	Jeff Chang
其實我們值得幸福、相愛的方法	Rainie Yang
蜿蜒、愛情不能作比較	Victor Wong
該忘了	Amber Kuo
I Wish	Panda Hsiung
酸甜	Tracy Huang
倫敦大橋垮下來	S.H.E
自選曲	Selina Jen
分手看看	Claire Kuo
還原	Rachel Liang
目中無人	Morris Pang
最好的安排	Christine Fan
心得	Valen Hsu
耍大牌	Della
1+1	Genie Chuo
閃亮	Michael Wong
怪我自己、苦笑、心安	Wallace Chung
學會不堅強	Jess Lee
大番薯	Richie Jen
療傷歌手	Anthony Neely
藍色地平線	Delphine Tsai

== Awards and nominations ==
Listing some of the awards Percy has won over the years:

Occasion	Awards
Da Xue Cheng National Universities Songs Producing Competition 大學城全國大專創作歌謠賽	我也很想他Excellent Work
NCCU Golden Melody 政治大學金旋獎	我也很想他First place in Songwriting; 我也很想他Second place in Songwriting; 我也很想他Best Composition; 我也很想他Best Performance
Malaysia PWH Music Award	我也很想他Top Ten Original Songs; 我也很想他Best Lyrics; 我也很想他Best Children's Songs; 我也很想他Most Popular Song in KTV
Nanyang Top Ten Singers Award 南洋十大歌星頒獎典禮	我也很想他Best Lyrics
AIM Chinese Music Awards	我也很想他Best Chinese Single; 我也很想他Best Lyrics; 我也很想他Best Composition; 我也很想他Best Songs Producing
MyFM Gold Songs Award MyFM至尊金曲頒獎典禮	我也很想他Top 20 Gold Songs
Golden Melody Awards	我也很想他Producer of the Year, Single
Hong Kong's 35th Top Ten Chinese Singles 香港第35屆十大中文金曲	我也很想他Hong Kong's 35th Top Ten Chinese Singles
Hong Kong's 30th Jade Solid Gold Awards 香港第30屆十大勁歌金曲	我也很想他Hong Kong's 30th Jade Solid Gold Awards
MACP Awards Ceremony 頒獎典禮	我也很想他Highest View in Chinese Songs; 我也很想他Song with Highest Royalties
