= Cyndiloves2sing Live Tour =

2019–2022 concert tour by Cyndi Wang

- Tour by Cyndi Wang
- Location: Asia
- Associated album: Cyndiloves2sing
- Start date: June 29, 2019
- End date: January 15, 2022
- No. of shows: 8

Cyndi Wang concert chronology
- Cyndi Wants! World Tour (2016–2017); Cyndiloves2sing Live Tour (2019–2022); Sugar High World Tour (2023–2025)

Cyndiloves2sing Live Tour (Chinese: CYNDILOVES2SING 愛。心凌巡迴演唱會) is the second concert tour by Taiwanese singer Cyndi Wang, held in support of her twelfth studio album Cyndiloves2sing (2018). The tour began in Chengdu at the Sichuan Gymnasium on June 29, 2019.

Wang held her second concert tour, Cyndiloves2sing World Tour after her twelfth studio album Cyndiloves2sing released. On the sixteenth anniversary of Wang's debut, February 24, 2019, she announced the tour will began in June 2019.

== Tour dates ==
Date	City	Country	Venue	Attendance
June 29, 2019	Chengdu	China	Sichuan Gymnasium	—
July 20, 2019	Shanghai	China	Shanghai Oriental Sports Center	11,000
August 3, 2019	Changsha	China	Hunan Int'l Convention & Exhibition Center	—
November 9, 2019	Macau	China	Cotai Arena	—
December 7, 2019	Guangzhou	China	Guangzhou Gymnasium	—
December 21, 2019	Wuhan	China	Wuhan Sports Center Gymnasium	—
January 2, 2021	Taipei	Taiwan	Taipei Arena	10,000
January 15, 2022	Kaohsiung	Taiwan	Kaohsiung Arena	10,000
Total				N/A
