= Cyndi Wants or Not? =

Studio album by Cyndi Wang
- Released: December 4, 2015
- Genre: Pop
- Length: 38:51
- Label: Universal Music

Cyndi Wang chronology
The 10th Cyndi (2014)	Cyndi Wants or Not? (2015)	Cyndiloves2sing (2018)

Singles from Cyndi Wants or Not?
- 1. "Far Away" Released: November 2, 2015; 2. "Maiden's Prayer" Released: November 24, 2015

Cyndi Wants or Not? (Chinese: 敢要敢不要; pinyin: Gǎn Yào Gǎn Bù Yào) is the eleventh studio album by Taiwanese recording artist Cyndi Wang, released on December 4, 2015, by Universal Music Taiwan. It produced the singles "Far Away" and "Maiden's Prayer".

== Release ==
The album was made available for pre-order at FamilyMart locations in Taiwan on November 11, 2015, and at all major retailers two days later. The album was officially released on December 4, 2015.

== Composition and singles ==
Cyndi Wants or Not? delves into the theme of a 30-years-old woman's courage and self-confidence. It expresses the singer's desires, what she wants, and what she does not want.

The lead single "Far Away" premiered on the radio station Hit FM in Taiwan on November 2, 2015. The song was named one of the top 20 hits of 2015 at the annual Global Chinese Golden Chart Awards.

== Track listing ==
Cyndi Wants or Not? track listing
No.	Title	Lyrics	Music	Length
1.	"BFF"	Hsiao Han	Terence Leong; Yu Hung-Lung; Kimberley Chen	3:26
2.	"Maiden's Prayer" (少女的祈禱)	Lin Wei; Jimmy Chou	Ville Alajuuma; Timo Oiva	3:32
3.	"Wants or Not?" (敢要敢不要)	Samuel Yu	Mayu Wakisaka; URU	4:02
4.	"Cry Baby" (哭泣Baby)	Four One	URU; Lin Cheng-You; Ling Kai	3:51
5.	"Want More" (給我多一些)	Yen Yun-Nung	Nese Ni; Victor Lau	3:35
6.	"Little Bit" (一點點)	Matilda Tao	Victor Lau; Victor Tse; Peggy Hsu	3:42
7.	"Far Away" (遠在眼前的你)	Four One	Liam Quinn; Lili Karamalikis	4:24
8.	"Understood" (我懂了)	Kenji Wu	Kenji Wu	4:33
9.	"Days Alone" (一個人的日子)	Lena Cha	Lena Cha; NU	4:11
10.	"Leave You" (去遠方)	Four One	Percy Phang	3:35
Total length:				38:51

== Release history ==
Release history for Cyndi Wants or Not?
Region	Date	Format(s)	Version	Label
Taiwan	December 4, 2015	CD; digital download; streaming	Standard	Universal Music Taiwan
