= Smiling Pasta =

- Promotional poster
- 微笑Pasta
- Genre: Romance / Comedy
- Starring: Cyndi Wang; Nicholas Teo; Gino Tsai; Zhao Hong Qiao; Zhao Shun; Jian Chang; Wang Juan; Hu Kang Xing; Song Zhi Ai; Wu Zhen Ya; Shen Meng Sheng; Bao Zheng Fang; Di Zhi Jie; Wei Ru; Darren Chiang
- Opening theme: "Rainbow's Smile" (彩虹的微笑) by Cyndi Wang
- Ending theme: "Tears of Polaris" (北極星的眼淚)by Nicholas Teo
- Country of origin: Taiwan
- Original language: Mandarin
- No. of episodes: 24

Production
- Running time: Sunday & Saturday

Original release
- Network: TTV / SETTV
- Release: July 16 – November 5, 2006

Related
- Magicians of Love 愛情魔髮師; Engagement For Love 愛情經紀約

Smiling Pasta (Chinese: 微笑 Pasta; pinyin: Wéixiào Pasta) is a romantic-comedy Taiwanese drama starring Cyndi Wang and Nicholas Teo. It was adapted into manhua by Yu Jia Yan.

== Synopsis ==
A young couple, not knowing each other in the past, collided with each other and created boundless rumors and a romance full of interest. Cheng Xiao-Shi is an innocent and honest common young girl, whereas He Qun-Gui is the new super star of singing circle, and the oldest son, out of two, of present speaker of a legislative body. These two parallel lines meet occasionally in the street. He was eluding from paparazzi at that time, but collided with her accidentally, after she was just dumped by her boy friend. The fierce collision made his lips pressed on hers by accident. It was such a nice chance for the paparazzo, and he shot this valuable moment with his camera. He Qun had no choice but to take her and escape.

== Story ==
The story revolves around 20-year-old Xiao Shi who makes a wish on her balcony for a fulfilling love life. By chance, a cup of hers falls in front of the car of the famous singer He Qun. Although they do not meet, this incident foretells the intertwining of their destinies.

Xiao Shi's family holds a good luck ceremony for her three-month anniversary with her boyfriend Peter. Xiao Shi's first love, Ah Zhe, has cursed her that her love will not last more than three months. Despite this, Xiao Shi is full of hope for Peter until he breaks up with her during a date, leaving her heartbroken.

Wandering on the street, Xiao Shi accidentally bumps into He Qun in disguise. While evading the paparazzi, they are mistakenly photographed kissing, leading to a media misunderstanding. To protect He Qun's image, his agent declares Xiao Shi to be his fiancée.

As the plot unfolds, Xiao Shi's first love, Ah Zhe, gradually learns about the involvement of He Qun's brother in the death of his girlfriend, which he cannot forgive. Influenced by Xiao Shi, He Qun begins to feel the love and warmth in the simple things of life.

Initially, Xiao Shi has feelings for He Qun's brother, Ah Zhe, but as the story progresses, the affection between He Qun and Xiao Shi deepens. Although He Qun initially denies his feelings for Xiao Shi, they eventually confess their love publicly and decide to be together. He Qun proposes to Xiao Shi, and their love story ends happily.

== Cast ==
- Cyndi Wang (王心凌) as Cheng Xiao Shi/成曉詩
- Nicholas Teo (張棟樑) as He Qun/何群
- Gino Tsai as Ah Zhe/阿哲 or He Rui Zhe/何瑞哲
- Joyce Chao (趙虹喬) as Rita
- Zhao Shun (趙舜) as Cheng Jin/成金
- Jian Chang (檢場) as Cheng Gang/成剛
- Wang Juan (王娟) as Chen Lin Ma Li/成林瑪麗
- Hu Kang Xing (胡康星) as Cheng Ming/成銘
- Song Zhi Ai as Huang Qian Hui/黃千慧
- Wu Zhen Ya (吳震亞) as Lei Long/雷龍
- Shen Meng-sheng (沈孟生) as He Meng Yuan/何孟元
- Bao Zheng Fang (鲍正芳) as Bi Li Ling/毕丽铃
- Di Zhi Jie (狄志杰) as Vincent
- Wei Ru (薇如) as Xiao Rou/筱柔
- Darren Chiang as Wei Zai
- Leon Jay Williams as himself (Episode 15 cameo)
- Ivy Chen as Tian Xin (Episode 15 cameo)

== Soundtrack ==
Smiling Pasta

Soundtrack album by Various Artists
- Released: July 14, 2006
- Genre: Mandopop
- Language: Mandarin
- Label: EMI (TW)

Smiling Pasta Original TV Soundtrack (微笑PASTA 電視原聲帶) was released on July 14, 2006 by Various Artists under EMI (Taiwan). It contains fourteen songs, which five songs are various instrumental versions of the original songs. The opening theme song is "Cǎi Hóng De Wēi Xiào" or "Rainbow's Smile" by Cyndi Wang, while the ending theme song is by Nicholas Teo entitled "Běi Jí Xīng De Yǎn Lèi" or "Tears from Polaris".

=== Track listing ===
No.	Title	Singer(s)	Length
1.	"Rainbow's Smile" (Cǎi Hóng De Wēi Xiào)	Cyndi Wang
2.	"Tears From Polaris" (Běi Jí Xīng De Yǎn Lèi)	Nicholas Teo
3.	"Happiness Express inst." (幸福快遞)
4.	"Little Turtle" (Xiǎo Wū Guī)	Nicholas Teo
5.	"The First Morning Star" (Huáng Hūn Xiǎo)	Cyndi Wang
6.	"I Do"	Cyndi Wang
7.	"I Do inst."
8.	"Remembrance" (Jì Niàn)	Adrian Fu
9.	"Dusk Down inst." (黃昏曉)
10.	"Maze" (Mí Gōng)	Yu Hao Wei
11.	"Zero Territory" (Líng De Lǐng Yù)	六甲
12.	"衝突與僵持 inst."
13.	"Tears from Polaris inst." (北極星的眼淚)
14.	"Just Smile" (Jiù Wēi Xiào Le)	Nicholas Teo
