= Sun and Moon Bay =

Bay in Hainan, China

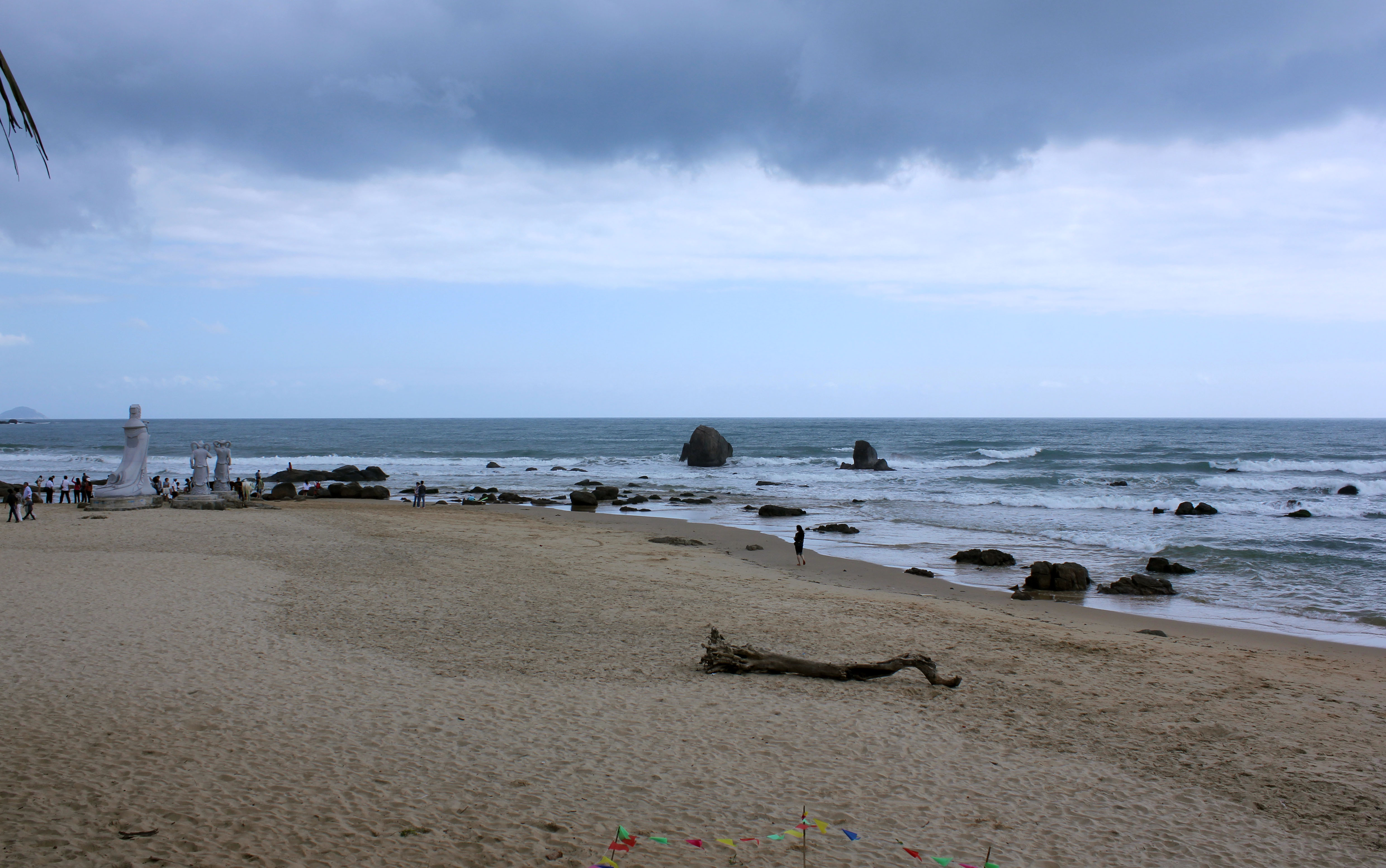

- Location within Hainan
- Location: Wanning, Hainan Province, China
- Coordinates: 18.547976°N 110.211994°E
- Ocean/sea sources: South China Sea
- Max. length: 4.5 km (2.8 mi)

Sun and Moon Bay (Chinese: 日月湾; pinyin: Rì Yuè Wān), also known as Riyue Bay, is located approximately 25 kilometres (16 mi) south of Wanning, Hainan, China. It is around 4.5 km (2.8 mi) long, and has been the site of numerous surfing events. The Sun and Moon Bay Haimen Tourism Area is located here.

The Shenzhou railway station is situated approximately 15 km (9.3 mi) northeast from this bay.
