= Bite Back (album) =

2023 studio album by Cyndi Wang

Studio album by Cyndi Wang
- Released: 12 October 2023
- Genre: Pop
- Length: 37:46
- Label: Sony Music

Cyndi Wang chronology
| My! Cyndi! (2020) | Bite Back (2023) |

Alternative cover
- "Mainland China Edition" cover

Singles from Bite Back
- 1. "Bite Back" Released: 5 September 2023; 2. "Sugar High" Released: 24 September 2023

Bite Back is the thirteenth studio album by Taiwanese singer Cyndi Wang, released on 12 October 2023 by Sony. It is Wang's album since her twelfth studio album Cyndiloves2sing (2018). She released the album on the twentieth anniversary of her debut. The album incorporates the theme of discovering new things about the person. The vinyl edition was released on 26 April 2024.

== History ==
The title track "Bite Back" was written by Lexie Liu, Alina Smith, and Femke Weidema. It is a dance song incorporating synth, trap, and video game sound effects. Its dance is called the "Sweet Bite Dance" and was choreographed by Kiel Tutin. The lyrics of the song concern challenging Wang's past self.

== Awards ==
Awards and nominations
| Award | Category | Nominated work | Result | Ref. |
|---|---|---|---|---|
| Golden Wolf Music Video Awards | Music Video of the Year | "Bite Back" | Won | |
| Golden Wolf Music Video Awards | Line Popular Music Video of the Year | "Bite Back" | Won | |

== Track listing ==
Bite Back track listing
| No. | Title | Lyrics | Music | Length |
|---|---|---|---|---|
| 1. | "Miss You the Most" (最想你的) | Wu Bai | Wu Bai | 4:18 |
| 2. | "Bite Back" | Lexie Liu; Alina Smith | Lexie Liu; Alina Smith; Femke Weidema | 3:30 |
| 3. | "All In" (對賭) | Zione | Zione | 4:20 |
| 4. | "Sugar High" | Emily Burns; Jacob Attwooll; Li Ruo-Jyun | Emily Burns; Jacob Attwooll | 2:39 |
| 5. | "Insincere" (言不由衷) | Accusefive Pan Yun-An | Accusefive Pan Yun-An | 4:59 |
| 6. | "Exaggerated" (浮誇) | Jarvis; JerryC; Pan Jia-Li; Wu Yi-Wei | Jarvis; JerryC; Pan Jia-Li; Wu Yi-Wei | 3:55 |
| 7. | "Just Break Up" (一律建議分手吧) | Li Ruo-Jyun | Hans Chen; Nese Ni; Chendy | 2:55 |
| 8. | "Sentimental" (感情用事) | Alex Chang Jien; David Ke | Alex Chang Jien | 3:57 |
| 9. | "Embracing Life's Encounters" (人間遇見) | Jarvis; JerryC; Chendy; Wu Yi-Wei | Jarvis; JerryC; Chendy; Wu Yi-Wei | 3:15 |
| 10. | "You Are Good Enough" (忘了說，你已經很好了) | Wendy T | Wendy T; TeN; Cosine Tseng; 831 Be | 3:58 |
| Total length: | | | | 37:46 |
