= Cyndiloves2sing =

2018 album by Cyndi Wang

Studio album by Cyndi Wang
- Released: 7 December 2018
- Genre: Pop
- Length: 37:13
- Label: Universal Music

Cyndi Wang chronology
Cyndi Wants or Not? (2015)	Cyndiloves2sing (2018)	My! Cyndi! (2020)

Singles from Cyndiloves2sing
- 1. "In the Cafe of Lost Youth" Released: 19 November 2018; 2. "The Big Sleep" Released: 7 December 2018

Cyndiloves2sing (traditional Chinese: 愛。心凌; simplified Chinese: 爱。心凌; pinyin: Ài Xīnlíng) is the twelfth studio album by Taiwanese recording artist Cyndi Wang, released on 7 December 2018 by Universal Music Taiwan. It spawned the singles "In the Cafe of Lost Youth" and "The Big Sleep".

== Background and release ==
The album's theme revolves around Wang's passion for music and performing. It was the best-selling one among female singers of Taiwan Five Music in 2018.

== Singles ==
The lead single "In the Cafe of Lost Youth" premiered on Hit FM on 19 November 2018. The music video for the song was uploaded to YouTube on 22 November 2018. Its lyrics describe youthful wanderings and express how although people may lose themselves, they eventually forge their own path. The music video for "The Big Sleep" was uploaded on 7 December.

== Track listing ==
Cyndiloves2sing track listing
No.	Title	Lyrics	Music	Length
1.	"In the Cafe of Lost Youth" (在青春迷失的咖啡館)	Sandee Chan	Sandee Chan	3:38
2.	"In Sheep's Clothing" (披着狼皮的羊)	Jennifer Hsu	Laurent Wilthien; Danelle Sandoval; Matthieu Tosi; Nick Mckerl; Jean-Noël Wilthien	3:23
3.	"The Burden of Love" (愛的重量)	Evangeline Wong	Evangeline Wong; Oliver	3:36
4.	"The Fault in Our Stars" (生命中的美好缺憾)	Xiaohan	Nese Ni; Derrick Hoh; Oliver	4:09
5.	"Seagull and the Cat Who Taught Her to Fly" (教海鷗飛行的貓)	Yen Yun-Nung	Chang Chien Chun-Wei; Oliver	3:36
6.	"Thunder" (劈你的雷正在路上)	Chen Sih-Yu	Christopher Baran; James Alan Ghaleb; Keta	3:41
7.	"The Big Sleep" (大眠)	Derek Shih	Alex Zhang Jian	3:59
8.	"I Do Not Exist" (到處不存在的我)	David Ke; Lai Yen-Yen	Chen Guan-Yu	4:22
9.	"The Paying Guest" (房客)	Chen Sih-Yu	Bernard Zheng	3:12
10.	"Sleeping Forest" (沉睡的森林)	Alien Yue	JerryC	3:37
Total length:				37:13

== Release history ==
Release history for CyndiLoves2Sing
Region	Date	Format(s)	Version	Label
Taiwan	7 December 2018	CD; digital download; streaming	Standard	Universal Music Taiwan
