= Cyndi Wang =

Taiwanese actress and singer (born 1982)

Cyndi Wang Hsin-ling
- 王心凌
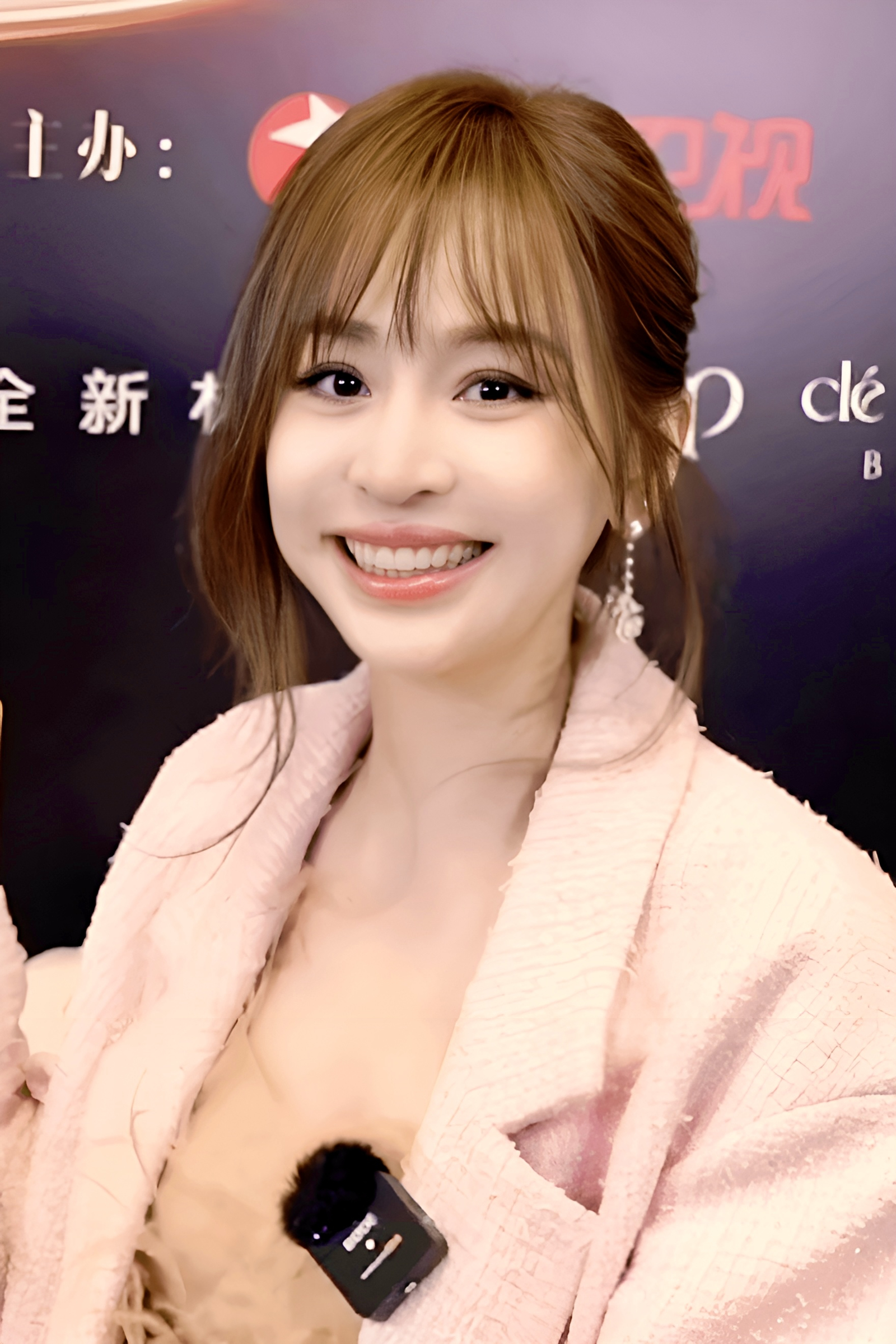
- Wang in 2022
- Born: 5 September 1982 (age 43); Hsinchu, Taiwan
- Occupations: Singer; actress
- Years active: 2003–present

Chinese name
- Traditional Chinese: 王心凌
- Simplified Chinese: 王心凌
Transcriptions
Standard Mandarin
- Hanyu Pinyin: Wáng Xīnlíng
- Wade–Giles: Wang^{2} Hsin^{1}-ling^{2}
Yue: Cantonese
- Jyutping: Wong4 Sam1 Ling4
- Musical career
- Genres: Mandopop; bubblegum pop
- Instrument: Vocals
- Labels: Avex (2002–2008); Gold Typhoon (2009–2011); Universal (2012–2023); Sony (2023–)

Cyndi Wang Hsin-ling (Chinese: 王心凌; pinyin: Wáng Xīnlíng; born 5 September 1982) is a Taiwanese singer and actress. Wang began her music career with the release of her debut album Begin... (2003), gaining popularity for her bubblegum, sugary style and "Sweetheart Princess" persona. She is also known for her roles in TV dramas, such as The Car Is In Pursuit (2000), Westside Story (2003), Heaven's Wedding Gown (2004), and Smiling Pasta (2006).

== Early life ==
Wang graduated from the Taipei Hwa Kang Arts School, where she majored in acting. Her father is a waishengren from Qingdao, while her mother is Hakka. Wang has a younger brother. After their parents divorced in 1992, they were raised by their mother.

Wang graduated from the Drama Department of Hwa Kang Arts School. In high school, she acted in TV series The Car Is In Pursuit and film The Cabbie, while appearing in the music video for "Remembrance" by Singaporean singer Tanya Chua. Later, with the help of a friend, she went to Avex for an audition and was selected.

== Career ==
In 2003, Wang released her first album, Begin..., which achieved good sales overseas, reaching the top of local record sales charts in Singapore. The same year, she sang the theme song "Suffering" with Tony Sun for Westside Story. In 2008, Wang ended her contract with Avex and released two compilation albums, Red Cyndi and Beautiful Days.

In mid-2022, Wang participated in the competition program Sisters Who Make Waves. Ahead the 20th anniversary of her entertainment debut, she sang "Love You" in the first episode of the program. At the same time, Avex uploaded all of Wang's official full-length music videos during her tenure with the company. In the fifth performance of the program, Cyndi Wang sang three of her representative ballad songs, "Big Sleep", "The Quiet Sea That Summer", and "When You".

== Philanthrophy ==
In January 2007, Wang sold throat lozenges she endorsed to raise funds for child abuse prevention and donated NT$100,000 to a child abuse prevention fund. The same year in May, she donated over NT$1 million (RMB 250,000) to disaster relief to help earthquake victims in Wenchuan, Sichuan rebuild their homes.

In September 2009, as a charity ambassador, Wang and other singers recorded and sang the theme song "Twilight Playground" for a charity event and called on the public to help raise living allowances for poor students. The same year in November, she served as a Genesis Charity Ambassador, calling forth the public to care for people in a vegetative state and to donate receipts to help them. Later, in October 2010, Wang filmed a charity poster for "Eternal Angels" and held a charity auction to promote the whole food movement and encourage cancer patients to fight the disease with courage.

In November 2011, Wang designed a Swarovski Christmas bracelet for online charity auction to help children from disadvantaged families. In June 2012, she participated in the "Clapham Hot Spring Cup – Celebrity Soccer Auction Charity Event" and her autographed jerseys and soccer balls were auctioned online to raise funds for children with autism. The same year in September, as a charity ambassador, Wang recorded and sang the theme song "Love × Love" with other singers and called on the public to help raise living allowances for impoverished students. In April 2013, she performed at the "Sisters' Love Women's Day Charity Concert" as a singer, raising funds for single-parent families with the International Single Parent Children's Education Foundation, while also encouraging women to pamper themselves. In August 2014, Wang participated in the "Pass on Love, Taiwan, Keep Going - Kaohsiung Gas Explosion Relief Gala" to raise funds for the victims of the Kaohsiung gas explosion. Later that year, Wang also served as a charity ambassador, experiencing agricultural labor and bringing warmth to local left-behind children with the families she experienced. In December 2016, she donated second-hand clothes for charity sale to help orphaned children and teenagers live a stable life. In December 2021, Wang gathered funds for families and students with low disadvantage.

In October 2023, Wang served as a Pink Power charity ambassador, calling on women to have regular breast examinations to prevent breast cancer. The same year in September, she donated money to help earthquake victims in Gansu, Chia, rebuild their homes. Returning to Taiwan, Wang contributed to Taipei Medical University Hospital to accompany sick children and fulfill their Christmas wishes.

== Controversy ==
In 2012, Wang was involved in a relationship scandal when she exposed the old photos of her ex-boyfriend.

== Discography ==
- Begin (2003)
- Cyndi Loves You (2004)
- Honey (2005)
- Cyndi with U (2005)
- Magic Cyndi (2007)
- Fly! Cyndi (2007)
- Heart2Heart (2009)
- Sticky (2011)
- Love? Or Not? (2012)
- The 10th Cyndi (2014)
- Cyndi Wants or Not? (2015)
- Cyndiloves2sing (2018)
- Bite Back (2023)

== Filmography ==
- The Cabbie (2000)
- The Car Is In Pursuit (2000)
- Westside Story (2003)
- La Robe De Mariage Des Cieux (2004)
- Smiling Pasta (2006)
- Momo Love (2008)
- Candy Rain (2008)
- Love Keeps Going (2011)
- Second Life (2013)
- Go! Crazy Gangster (2016)
- Quiet Now (2019)

== Concert tours ==
- Cyndi Wants! World Tour (2016–2017)
- Cyndiloves2sing Live Tour (2019–2022)
- Sugar High World Tour (2023–2026)

== Awards and nominations ==
Name of award ceremony, year presented, award category, nominee of award, and result of nomination
Award ceremony	Year	Category	Nominee(s) / Work(s)	Result	Ref.
Chinese Drama Awards	2013	Best On-Screen Kiss	Second Life	Won	
Hito Music Awards	2005	Top 10 Songs of the Year	"Love You"	Won	
Hito Music Awards	2006	Top 10 Songs of the Year	Honey	Won	
Hito Music Awards	2007	Top 10 Songs of the Year	"Curly Eye Lashes"	Won	
Hito Music Awards	2013	Favorite Love Song	"Become Strangers"	Won	
Hito Music Awards	2013	Web Premiere Popular Award	"Become Strangers"	Won	
Huading Awards	2011	Best Actress in Idol Dramas	Love Keeps Going	Won	
