= The King of Beasts Tour =

2026 concert tour by Joker Xue

King of Beasts Tour
- Tour by Joker Xue
- Start date: March 20, 2026
- No. of shows: 106 (as of November 12, 2026)
- Attendance: 4.071 million (90 shows)

Joker Xue concert chronology
- Douyin Online Concert: Ke (2023）; King of Beasts Tour (2026)

The King of Beasts Tour is the ongoing headlining concert tour by Chinese singer-songwriter Joker Xue. It is Xue's fourth tour and commenced with a series of nine sold-out shows in Guangzhou on March 20, 2026. With the run time of 3 hours featuring approximately 28 songs, the concert is divided into two parts: the first half presents the main storyline exploring what it means to be the "King of Beasts" and the second half features a collection of Xue's hit songs and an interactive section with audience duets.

== Background ==
On August 18, 2024, the teaser for the King of Beasts Tour (万兽之王巡回演唱会) was shown to the audience at the mainland China finale of Xue's Extraterrestrial World Tour. The video was later shared on Xue's personal Weibo as well.

On February 9, 2026, Xue posted the first promotional poster for King of Beasts Tour.

== Production ==
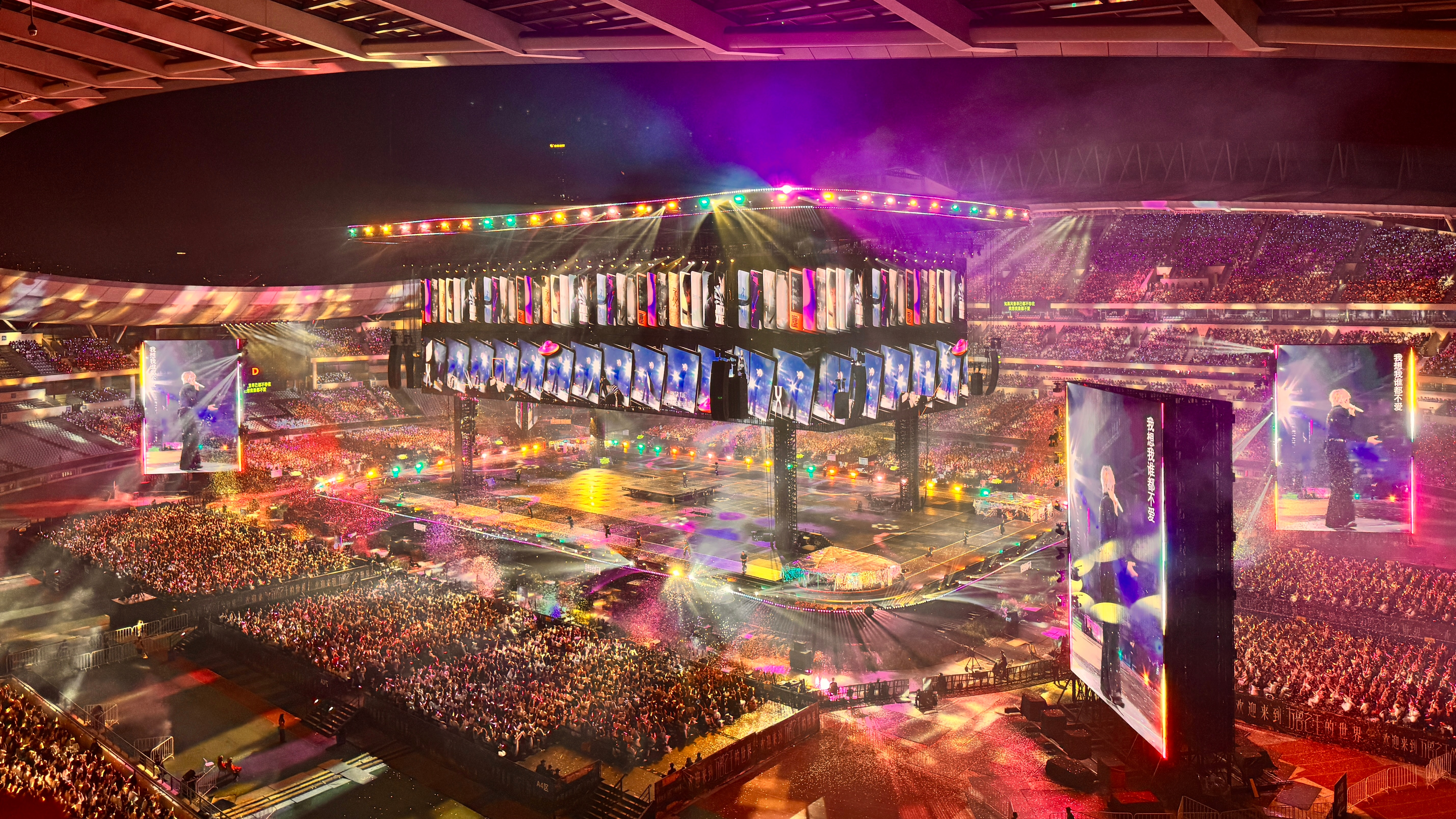
View from the corner of the stage.

=== Stage design ===
The record-setting four-sided stage spans 5,000 square meters, measuring 93 meters wide, 53 meters deep and rising 36 meters high; the stage is approximately the height of a twelve-story building and three-quarters of a football pitch.

To ensure high quality of viewin experience, the stage features a wraparound LED mega-screen that spans 5,600 square meter and four double-sided freestanding screens are placed at the corners of the main stage. Equipped with a custom 64x5-meter mechanical flipping screen and multiple sets of lifting platforms and rotating apparatus, the stage's optimized spatial layout integrates artist dressing space beneath the floor. Throughout the show, the stage undergoes continuous multi-dimensional reconfigurations.

Rows of naturally growing lawns surround the stage, creating an immersive environment and visual contrast against the industrial structure of the stage. Other sensory effects are utilized to create a truly immersive experience, including but not limited to: panoramic projections, motion seats, scent diffusions, and humanoid robot. Additional equipment such as wire rigging platforms, mechanical track, and perimeter camera crane arms allow for full-domain interaction across the stage, in the air, and within the audience seating.

=== Lighting and sound ===
ACME Group's design transformed the stage into "a living 'spiritual beast cage,' where reality and metaphor collided, creating a powerful, enveloping spatial narrative." 800 distinct lighting combinations are generate per minute via 840 Tornado effect light fixtures and 120 AECO 30 IP profile lights. Each Tornado fixture includes five independently-controlled light heads with a main light source of five 120W RGBL LEDs encircled by 120 0.5W RGB LEDs. The AECO 30 IP, powered by 1,800-Watt LED, features CMY color mixing.

With L-Acoustics certified partners MRT, the King of Beasts Tour is the first large-scale production to deploy the L1 loudspeaker and CS1 cardioid subwoofer. Built on L-Acoustics patented Progressive Ultra-Dense Line Source (PULS) technology, the L1 and CS1 systems are able to provide enhanced full-band coherence and integrated control. The line array comprises 16 L1s, 4 L1Ds, 32 CS1s, 12 L2s, 4 L2Ds, 76 KS28, 84 KaraIIs, 40 LA7.16s, and 46 LA12Xs.

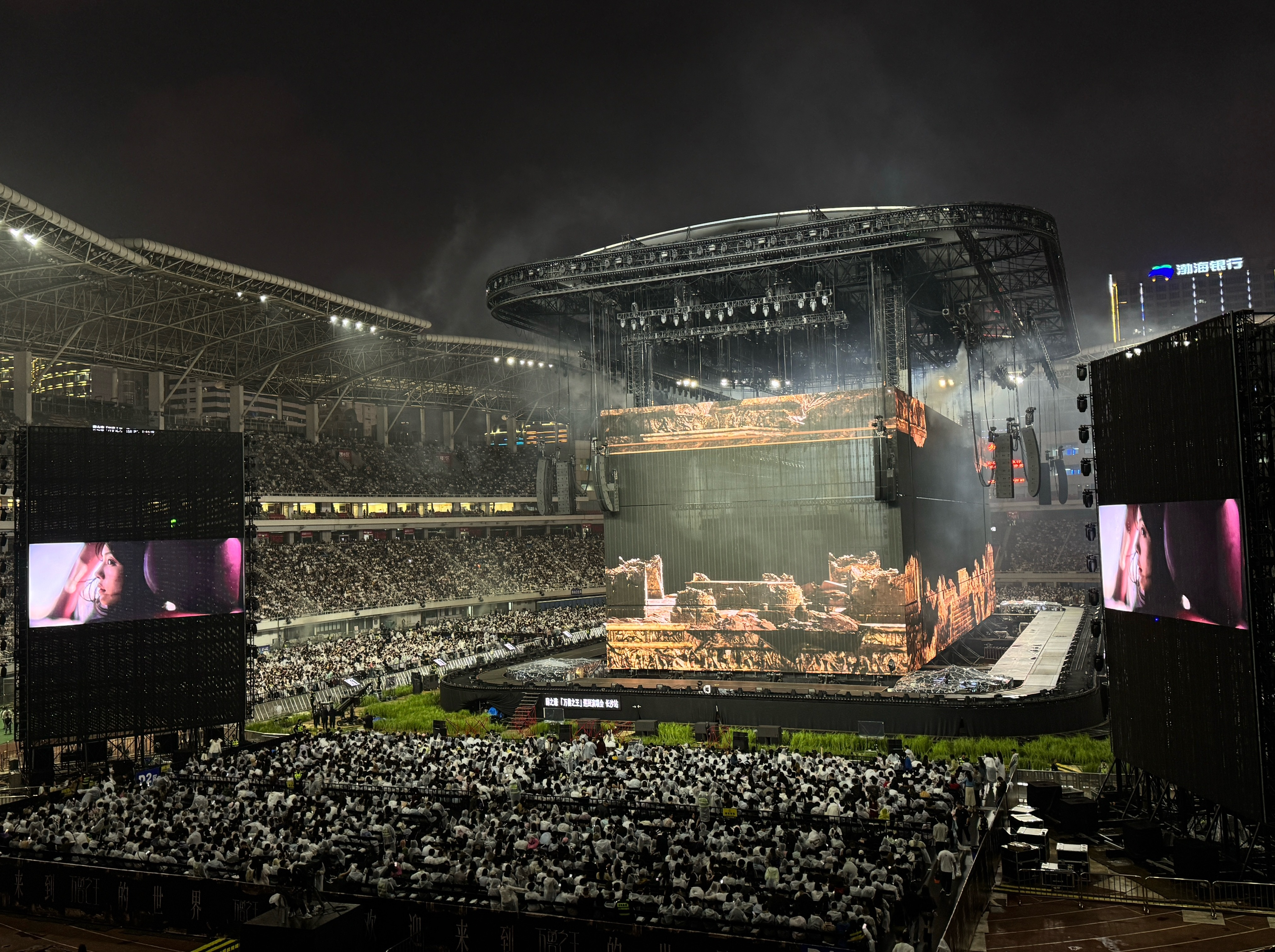
View the short side of the stage.

=== Seating design ===
The King of Beasts Tour pioneered elevated tiered seating design for the floor section, utilizing progressively raised rows to ensure the sightlines from the middle and rear sections remain parallel to the stage and unimpaired and reduce the attendees' physical strain of continually looking upward during the show. Staff members and Xue himself tested the view from every seat in order to optimize audience experience.

Due to the monumental size of the stage, Xue urged fans to consider purchasing the lowest priced balcony seats (¥317, approximately $46) instead of the highest priced floor seats (¥1717, approximately $249) because "even the cheapest seats are not far away." In addition, 60% of the tickets are affordably priced below ¥1000 (approximately $148).

On May 31, National Disability Day in China, Xue invited members of Nanjing Disabled Persons' Federation to attend the concert that evening, free of charge and with transportation provided. The members were seated in a dedicated floor section with accessible ramps, widened passageways, and companion seats. Xue continued to invite people with disabilities to attend his concerts at subsequent stops and provided accommodations.

== Awards ==
Awards and nominations for the King of Beasts Tour
Year	Ceremony	Category	Result	Ref.
2026	London Design Awards	Interior Design - Stage	Platinum Winner	
2026	MUSE Design Awards	Interior Design - Stage	Platinum Winner	

== Commercial performance ==
=== Tourism ===
Xue's economic impact is actively sought after by cities, with Qingdao launching a comprehensive initiative to attract major performances with dedicated service liaisons and reduced fees. Xue's Shenzhen stop originally featured six consecutive shows, for which all tickets sold out in just 51 seconds, leading the organizers to add a seventh performance that also sold out quickly. This led to Shenzhen Evening News citing Xue's seven-show run as an example of "concert economy," where young people travel to a city for a single performance, that presents a fresh opportunity for urban cultural tourism.

Xue's nine Guangzhou shows generated ¥2.2 billion (approximately $325 million) in tourism revenue, with 79% of non-local attendees.

During the Labor Day Golden Week, the three shows in Taiyuan attracted nearly 120,000 attendees, 65% of whom traveled from outside the province. The concert series led to a 48% year-on-year surge in hotel booking activity, with the average length of stay reached two to three nights.

For his six shows in Nanjing, Xue generated ¥2 billion (approximately $295 million) in tourism revenue, accounting for 57% of Nanjing's total tourism revenue, ¥3.5 billion (approximately $517 million), from January to May 2026.

Five of Xue's seven shows in Chengdu span the National Day Golden Week vacation. During those five days, the organizers arranged for an afternoon music showcase featuring Xue's music each day, attracting a total audience of 20,000 and directly generating over ¥300,000 (approximately $45,000) in revenue for nearby businesses. Revenue also increased post-concert, with late-night sales accounting for 30% of the day's total revenue for surrounding businesses, with many extending their operating hours. Xue's concerts set a new record for tourism numbers with an increase of 28.5% compared to the same period last year.

=== Consumer protection ===
On March 29, 2026, the fifth show of the Guangzhou stop of the King of Beasts Tour was severely impacted by torrential rain that caused widespread malfunction of stage equipment. Xue announced at the midpoint of the concert that he is offering ticket refund or exchange due to the performance not meeting his standards and he would not have the audience "waste their money." Similar to the September 10, 2023 Chengdu show of his Extraterrestrial World Tour, concertgoers were offered the choice to refund their tickets and, for out-of-town attendees, receive full reimbursement for travel and lodging expenses or to exchanger their tickets for a future show of their choice prior to January 31, 2027.

On July 7, 2026, Xue publicly opposed product bundling for his Beijing shows. Because all tickets were sold out during the general public sale, consumers who wish to attend the concert were forced to purchase ticket bundles priced at almost or more than double the cost of an individual ticket. Xue stated "granting any platform the authorization to sell my tickets was never intended to facilitate the emergence of inflated prices or bundled sales" and such practice denied the consumers "the freedom to choose exactly what they want." Within 24 hours, Douyin removed the ticket bundles.

On August 8, 2026, the second (August 8) and third (August 9) shows of his seven-show Hangzhou stop were canceled due to safety concerns stemmed from Typhoon Dolphin. Ticker holders were offered the same compensation package as the March 29 Guangzhou show, with the deadline for ticket exchange set at June 30, 2027.

=== Venue records ===
Venue records of the King of Beasts Tour
Year	Period	Venue	Description
2026	April 10-12, 17-19	Helong Sports Center Stadium	Highest number of consecutive shows (6) at the venue. Highest total attendance of a single concert tour. First artist to perform six consecutive shows at the venue.
2026	April 24-26, May 1-3	Shanxi Sports Centre Stadium	Highest number of consecutive shows (6) at the venue. Highest total attendance of a single concert tour. First artist to perform six consecutive shows at the venue. First artist to perform six consecutive shows in the city of Taiyuan. First artist to perform six consecutive shows in the Shanxi province.
2026	May 8-10, 15-17	Qingdao Citizen Fitness Center Stadium	Highest number of consecutive shows (6) at the venue. Highest total attendance of a single concert tour. First artist to perform six consecutive shows at the venue. First artist to perform six consecutive shows in the city of Qingdao. First artist to perform six consecutive shows in the Shandong province.
2026	May 22-24, 29-31	Nanjing Olympic Sports Centre	Highest number of consecutive shows (6) at the venue. Highest total attendance of a single concert tour. First artist to perform six consecutive shows at the venue.
2026	June 12-14	Luoyang Olympic Sports Center Stadium	Highest number of consecutive shows (3) at the venue. Highest total attendance of a single concert tour. First artist to perform three consecutive shows at the venue.
2026	June 26-28, July 3-5	Chongqing Olympic Sports Center	Highest number of consecutive shows (6) at the venue. Highest total attendance of a single concert tour. First artist to perform six consecutive shows at the venue.
2026	July 10-12, July 17-19, July 24-26, July 31-August 2	Beijing National Stadium	Highest total attendance of a single concert tour by a mainland China artist. Highest box office of a single concert tour by a mainland China artist.
2026	September 5-6, 12-13	Lanzhou Olympic Center Stadium	Highest number of consecutive shows (4) at the venue. First artist to perform four consecutive shows at the venue.
2026	September 19-20, 26-27	Dalian Sports Centre Stadium	Highest number of consecutive shows (4) at the venue. First artist to perform four consecutive shows at the venue.
2026	October 31, November 1, 6-8	Xiamen Egret Stadium	First tour featuring 360-degree stage

== Set list ==
The following set list is based on the March 20, 2026 concert in Guangzhou. It is not representative of all shows.

Acts I to III depict the story of "The King of Beasts," Acts IV and V consist of Xue's hit songs and the audience duets, and Act VI has Xue reprising his 0717 persona from his Extraterrestrial World Tour.

Act I

- Fox (狐狸)
- Ambition (野心)
- The Axe Trick (金斧子银斧子)
- Ugly (丑八怪)
- Animal World (动物世界)

Act II

- Freak (怪咖)
- The Crossing (渡)
- My Athena (我的雅典娜)
- Phoenix Feathers and Unicorn Horns (凤毛麟角)
- Hand Behind the Back (背过手)

Act III

- Creation (造物)
- Conviction (念)
- Mermaid Diamond (粉钻)
- Forsaken Youth (违背的青春)
- Camel (骆驼)

Act IV

- Serious Snow (认真的雪)
- Actually (其实)
- Mediocre (平庸)
- That Day On the Road of No Return (在那天回不去的路上)
- Acoustic piano medley: The Best (最好), Just Right (刚刚好), The Mute (哑巴), What Do You Want From Me (你还要我怎样), Hobby (爱好), Like the Wind (像风一样)
- To Here (到这) with Jace Guo

Act V

- Audience Duets (see section)
- Gentleman (绅士)
- An Unexpected Journey (意外)
- Nothing

Act VI

- Extraterrestrial (天外来物)
- Deeply Loved You (深深爱过你)
- Radius Around You (方圆几里)
- Leap (跃)

=== Alterations ===
- Nanjing: "To Here (到这)" was removed from the setlist due to Jace Guo's absence.
- Luoyang: "City of Luo (洛城)" replaced "Radius Around You (方圆几里)."
- Chongqing: "Gold Rush (淘金熱)" replaced "To Here (到这)" and was performed by Jace Guo alone & "Actor (演员)" replaced "Radius Around You (方圆几里)."
- Beijing: "Life After You Left Beijing (那是你离开了北京的生活)" replaced "Gentleman (绅士)" & "Actor (演员)" replaced "Radius Around You (方圆几里)."

=== Audience duets ===
During the second to last segment of the concert, Xue randomly selects two audience members to sing one of his songs with him. If time allows, a third or fourth audience member may be selected.

On May 4, Xue added a third slot to the audience duet segment, one that will be selected via an online cover contest on Douyin. Participation is limited to floor section, as staff members need to be able to deliver the headset and microphone quickly. From the submissions, two finalists will be selected. Both will also showcase their singing skills with a 15-second snippet of their selected song then play a round of rock-paper-scissors against each other for the third slot.

==== Song selection list ====
The song selection list began with 18 songs in Guangzhou and has since grown to more than 40 songs because Xue frequently adds new songs based on audience feedback. The following list is in alphabetical order based on the translated title.

- Accompany You to Wander (陪你去流浪)
- Actor (演员)^{1}
- Adoration (崇拜)
- Allure (倾城)^{6}
- Ambiguous (暧昧)^{2} ^{6}
- But (可)
- City of Luo (洛城)^{3}
- Criminal Record (把你揉碎捏成苹果)^{3}
- Exhausted (耗尽)^{1}
- Express Our Feelings (聊表心意)
- Farewell My Concubine (霸王別姬)
- Farmers and the Land (农民与土地)^{1}
- Foreshadowing (伏笔)^{6}
- Half (一半)^{2}
- How Are You (你过得好吗)^{6}
- I Finally Became Someone Else's Woman (我终于成了别人的女人)
- I Know That You Know (我知道你都知道)^{6}
- I Think I've Seen You Somewhere (我好像在哪见过你)^{6}
- I'm Afraid (我害怕)
- In Order to Meet You (为了遇见你)^{6}
- Is There (有没有)^{6}
- It's Been So Long (这么久没见)^{6}
- It's Raining (下雨了)
- Like the Wind (像风一样)^{6}
- Life After You Left Beijing (那是你离开了北京的生活)^{1} ^{5}
- Love's Expiration Date (爱的期限)^{4}
- Mocking (笑场)^{1}
- Once Upon a Time in Zurich (苏黎世的从前)
- Paper Boat (纸船)
- Phoenix Hairpin (钗头凤)^{6}
- Puppet (木偶人)^{1}
- Radius Around You (方圆几里)^{3}
- Reckless (肆无忌惮)^{4}
- Rent or Purchase (租购)^{1}
- Skyscrapers (摩天大楼)^{6}
- Small Sharp Point (小尖尖)
- Stubborn Illness (顽疾)^{1}
- Supporting Role (男二号)^{1}
- Tardy (迟迟)
- Thank You to Those Who Love Me (爱我的人 谢谢你)^{4}
- Turn Waste Into Treasure (变废为宝)^{6}
- Wait for Me to Come Home (等我回家)^{4}
- Waiting (守候)^{3}
- Wake Up (醒来)
- What Am I To You (这样一来我算什么)
- Yellow Maple Leaves (黄色枫叶)^{4}
- You Are Not Alone (你不是一个人)
- Youth of Galaxy (银河少年)

^Note 1: Added to the list at the Qingdao shows.
^Note 2: Removed from the list at the Qingdao shows.
^Note 3: Added to the list at the Chongqing shows.
^Note 4: Added to the list at the Beijing shows.
^Note 5: Removed from the list at the Beijing shows.
^Note 6: Added to the list at the Shenzhen shows.

== Tour dates ==
List of tour dates
Date	City	Country	Venue	Attendance
March 20, 2026	Guangzhou	China	Tianhe Sports Centre Stadium	405,000
March 21, 2026	Guangzhou	China	Tianhe Sports Centre Stadium	405,000
March 22, 2026	Guangzhou	China	Tianhe Sports Centre Stadium	405,000
March 27, 2026	Guangzhou	China	Tianhe Sports Centre Stadium	405,000
March 28, 2026	Guangzhou	China	Tianhe Sports Centre Stadium	405,000
March 29, 2026	Guangzhou	China	Tianhe Sports Centre Stadium	405,000
April 3, 2026	Guangzhou	China	Tianhe Sports Centre Stadium	405,000
April 4, 2026	Guangzhou	China	Tianhe Sports Centre Stadium	405,000
April 5, 2026	Guangzhou	China	Tianhe Sports Centre Stadium	405,000
April 10, 2026	Changsha	China	Helong Sports Center Stadium	240,000 (Note: Estimate based on attendance for April 10-12)
April 11, 2026	Changsha	China	Helong Sports Center Stadium	240,000
April 12, 2026	Changsha	China	Helong Sports Center Stadium	240,000
April 17, 2026	Changsha	China	Helong Sports Center Stadium	240,000
April 18, 2026	Changsha	China	Helong Sports Center Stadium	240,000
April 19, 2026	Changsha	China	Helong Sports Center Stadium	240,000
April 24, 2026	Taiyuan	China	Shanxi Sports Centre Stadium	240,000
April 25, 2026	Taiyuan	China	Shanxi Sports Centre Stadium	240,000
April 26, 2026	Taiyuan	China	Shanxi Sports Centre Stadium	240,000
May 1, 2026	Taiyuan	China	Shanxi Sports Centre Stadium	240,000
May 2, 2026	Taiyuan	China	Shanxi Sports Centre Stadium	240,000
May 3, 2026	Taiyuan	China	Shanxi Sports Centre Stadium	240,000
May 8, 2026	Qingdao	China	Qingdao Citizen Fitness Center Stadium	250,000
May 9, 2026	Qingdao	China	Qingdao Citizen Fitness Center Stadium	250,000
May 10, 2026	Qingdao	China	Qingdao Citizen Fitness Center Stadium	250,000
May 15, 2026	Qingdao	China	Qingdao Citizen Fitness Center Stadium	250,000
May 16, 2026	Qingdao	China	Qingdao Citizen Fitness Center Stadium	250,000
May 17, 2026	Qingdao	China	Qingdao Citizen Fitness Center Stadium	250,000
May 22, 2026	Nanjing	China	Nanjing Olympic Sports Centre	360,000
May 23, 2026	Nanjing	China	Nanjing Olympic Sports Centre	360,000
May 24, 2026	Nanjing	China	Nanjing Olympic Sports Centre	360,000
May 29, 2026	Nanjing	China	Nanjing Olympic Sports Centre	360,000
May 30, 2026	Nanjing	China	Nanjing Olympic Sports Centre	360,000
May 31, 2026	Nanjing	China	Nanjing Olympic Sports Centre	360,000
June 12, 2026	Luoyang	China	Luoyang Olympic Sports Center Stadium	120,000
June 13, 2026	Luoyang	China	Luoyang Olympic Sports Center Stadium	120,000
June 14, 2026	Luoyang	China	Luoyang Olympic Sports Center Stadium	120,000
June 26, 2026	Chongqing	China	Chongqing Olympic Sports Center	240,000 (Note: Estimate based on attendance for June 26-28)
June 27, 2026	Chongqing	China	Chongqing Olympic Sports Center	240,000
June 28, 2026	Chongqing	China	Chongqing Olympic Sports Center	240,000
July 3, 2026	Chongqing	China	Chongqing Olympic Sports Center	240,000
July 4, 2026	Chongqing	China	Chongqing Olympic Sports Center	240,000
July 5, 2026	Chongqing	China	Chongqing Olympic Sports Center	240,000
July 10, 2026	Beijing	China	Beijing National Stadium	697,000
July 11, 2026	Beijing	China	Beijing National Stadium	697,000
July 12, 2026	Beijing	China	Beijing National Stadium	697,000
July 17, 2026	Beijing	China	Beijing National Stadium	697,000
July 18, 2026	Beijing	China	Beijing National Stadium	697,000
July 19, 2026	Beijing	China	Beijing National Stadium	697,000
July 24, 2026	Beijing	China	Beijing National Stadium	697,000
July 25, 2026	Beijing	China	Beijing National Stadium	697,000
July 26, 2026	Beijing	China	Beijing National Stadium	697,000
July 31, 2026	Beijing	China	Beijing National Stadium	697,000
August 1, 2026	Beijing	China	Beijing National Stadium	697,000
August 2, 2026	Beijing	China	Beijing National Stadium	697,000
August 7, 2026	Hangzhou	China	Hangzhou Olympic Expo Center	273,000
August 13, 2026	Hangzhou	China	Hangzhou Olympic Expo Center	273,000
August 14, 2026	Hangzhou	China	Hangzhou Olympic Expo Center	273,000
August 15, 2026	Hangzhou	China	Hangzhou Olympic Expo Center	273,000
August 16, 2026	Hangzhou	China	Hangzhou Olympic Expo Center	273,000
August 21, 2026	Shenzhen	China	Shenzhen Universiade Sports Centre	280,000 (Note: Estimate based on attendance for August 30)
August 22, 2026	Shenzhen	China	Shenzhen Universiade Sports Centre	280,000
August 23, 2026	Shenzhen	China	Shenzhen Universiade Sports Centre	280,000
August 27, 2026	Shenzhen	China	Shenzhen Universiade Sports Centre	280,000
August 28, 2026	Shenzhen	China	Shenzhen Universiade Sports Centre	280,000
August 29, 2026	Shenzhen	China	Shenzhen Universiade Sports Centre	280,000
August 30, 2026	Shenzhen	China	Shenzhen Universiade Sports Centre	280,000
September 5, 2026	Lanzhou	China	Lanzhou Olympic Center Stadium	200,000
September 6, 2026	Lanzhou	China	Lanzhou Olympic Center Stadium	200,000
September 12, 2026	Lanzhou	China	Lanzhou Olympic Center Stadium	200,000
September 13, 2026	Lanzhou	China	Lanzhou Olympic Center Stadium	200,000
September 19, 2026	Dalian	China	Dalian Sports Centre Stadium	120,000 (Note: Estimate based on attendance for September 26)
September 20, 2026	Dalian	China	Dalian Sports Centre Stadium	120,000
September 26, 2026	Dalian	China	Dalian Sports Centre Stadium	120,000
September 27, 2026	Dalian	China	Dalian Sports Centre Stadium	120,000
October 1, 2026	Chengdu	China	Dong'an Lake Sports Park Main Stadium	240,000
October 2, 2026	Chengdu	China	Dong'an Lake Sports Park Main Stadium	240,000
October 3, 2026	Chengdu	China	Dong'an Lake Sports Park Main Stadium	240,000
October 6, 2026	Chengdu	China	Dong'an Lake Sports Park Main Stadium	240,000
October 7, 2026	Chengdu	China	Dong'an Lake Sports Park Main Stadium	240,000
October 10, 2026	Chengdu	China	Dong'an Lake Sports Park Main Stadium	240,000
October 11, 2026	Chengdu	China	Dong'an Lake Sports Park Main Stadium	240,000
October 17, 2026	Guiyang	China	Guiyang Olympic Sports Center	146,000
October 18, 2026	Guiyang	China	Guiyang Olympic Sports Center	146,000
October 24, 2026	Guiyang	China	Guiyang Olympic Sports Center	146,000
October 25, 2026	Guiyang	China	Guiyang Olympic Sports Center	146,000
October 31, 2026	Xiamen	China	Xiamen Egret Stadium	260,000
November 1, 2026	Xiamen	China	Xiamen Egret Stadium	260,000
November 6, 2026	Xiamen	China	Xiamen Egret Stadium	260,000
November 7, 2026	Xiamen	China	Xiamen Egret Stadium	260,000
November 8, 2026	Xiamen	China	Xiamen Egret Stadium	260,000
November 13, 2026	Wuxi	China	Wuxi Olympic Sports Center Stadium	
November 14, 2026	Wuxi	China	Wuxi Olympic Sports Center Stadium	
November 15, 2026	Wuxi	China	Wuxi Olympic Sports Center Stadium	
November 20, 2026	Wuxi	China	Wuxi Olympic Sports Center Stadium	
November 21, 2026	Wuxi	China	Wuxi Olympic Sports Center Stadium	
November 22, 2026	Wuxi	China	Wuxi Olympic Sports Center Stadium	
November 27, 2026	Wuxi	China	Wuxi Olympic Sports Center Stadium	
November 28, 2026	Wuxi	China	Wuxi Olympic Sports Center Stadium	
November 29, 2026	Wuxi	China	Wuxi Olympic Sports Center Stadium	
December 4, 2026	Ganzhou	China	Ganzhou City Fitness Center Stadium	
December 5, 2026	Ganzhou	China	Ganzhou City Fitness Center Stadium	
December 6, 2026	Ganzhou	China	Ganzhou City Fitness Center Stadium	
December 19, 2026	Kunming	China	Kunming Tuodong Sports Center	
December 20, 2026	Kunming	China	Kunming Tuodong Sports Center	
December 25, 2026	Kunming	China	Kunming Tuodong Sports Center	
December 26, 2026	Kunming	China	Kunming Tuodong Sports Center	

=== Canceled shows ===
List of canceled shows
Date	City	Country	Venue	Reason
August 8, 2026	Hangzhou	China	Hangzhou Olympic Sports Center Stadium	Safety concerns due to the impact of Typhoon Dolphin.
August 9, 2026	Hangzhou	China	Hangzhou Olympic Sports Center Stadium	Safety concerns due to the impact of Typhoon Dolphin.
