= Beijing National Stadium =

Stadium in China

Coordinates: 39°59′30″N 116°23′26″E

National Stadium
- 国家体育场·鸟巢
- Bird's Nest

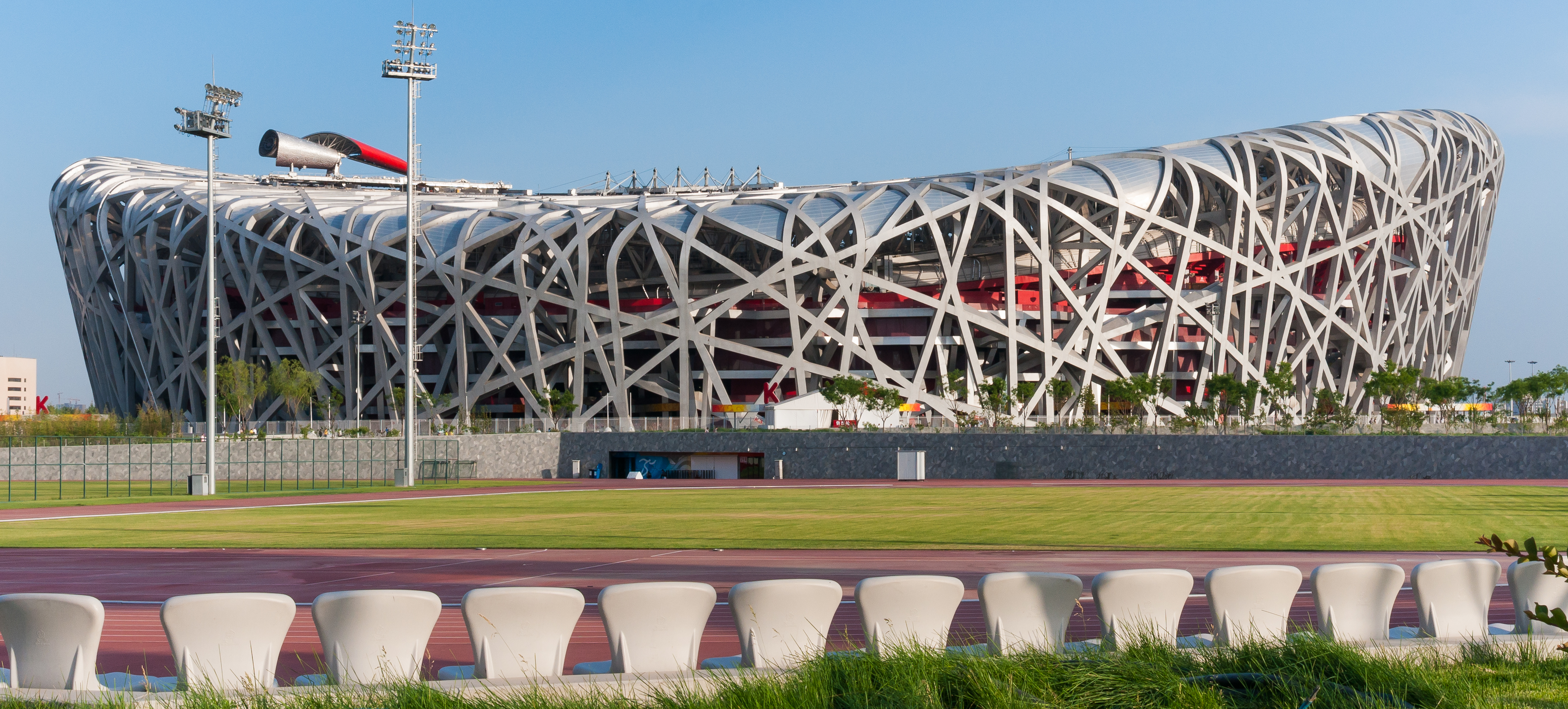
- Exterior view of the stadium
- Interactive map of National Stadium
- Full name: National Stadium
- Location: 1 National Stadium South Road, Beijing, China
- Capacity: 91,000
- Executive suites: 140
- Surface: Grass, All-weather running track
- Record attendance: 89,102 (Nigeria–Argentina Olympic football match, 23 August 2008)
- Public transit: Beijing Subway: Olympic Park (Line 8, Line 15); Olympic Sports Center (Line 8)

Construction
- Groundbreaking: 24 December 2003; 22 years ago
- Built: 2003–2008
- Opened: 28 June 2008; 18 years ago
- Cost: CN¥2.3 billion
- Architects: Herzog & de Meuron; ArupSport; China Architectural Design & Research Group; Ai Weiwei (Artistic consultant)
- Structural engineer: Arup

Tenants
- China national football team (selected matches); China women's national football team (selected matches); China national basketball team (2009–2010)

Website
- n-s.cn

Beijing National Stadium
- Simplified Chinese: 国家体育场
- Traditional Chinese: 國家體育場
Transcriptions
Standard Mandarin
- Hanyu Pinyin: Guójiā Tǐyùchǎng
- Wade–Giles: Kwóchiā T'ǐyǜch'ǎng
- Yale Romanization: Gwójyā Tǐyùchǎng
Yue: Cantonese
- Yale Romanization: Gwok gà Tái yuhk chèuhng
- Jyutping: Gwok^{3}gaa^{1} Tai^{2}juk^{6}coeng^{4}
Southern Min
- Hokkien POJ: Kok-ka Thái-io̍k-tiûⁿ

Alternative Chinese name
- Simplified Chinese: 鸟巢
- Traditional Chinese: 鳥巢
- Literal meaning: Bird's Nest
Transcriptions
Standard Mandarin
- Hanyu Pinyin: Niǎo Cháo
- Wade–Giles: Niǎo Ch'áo
- Yale Romanization: Nyǎu Cháu
Yue: Cantonese
- Yale Romanization: Níuh Chàauh
- Jyutping: Niu^{5} Caau^{4}
Southern Min
- Hokkien POJ: Chiáu Châu

The National Stadium (国家体育场, Guójiā Tǐyùchǎng), a.k.a. the Bird's Nest (鸟巢), is a stadium at Olympic Green in Chaoyang, Beijing, China. The National Stadium, covering an area of 204,000 square meters with an 80,000 person capacity (91,000 with temporary seating), broke ground in December 2003, officially started construction in March 2004, and was completed in June 2008.

The National Stadium is owned and operated by a partnership company between Beijing Municipal State-owned Assets Management Co Ltd (58%) and CITIC Group (42%).

The stadium was designed for the 2008 Summer Olympics and Paralympics. It was also used during the 2022 Winter Olympics and Paralympics.

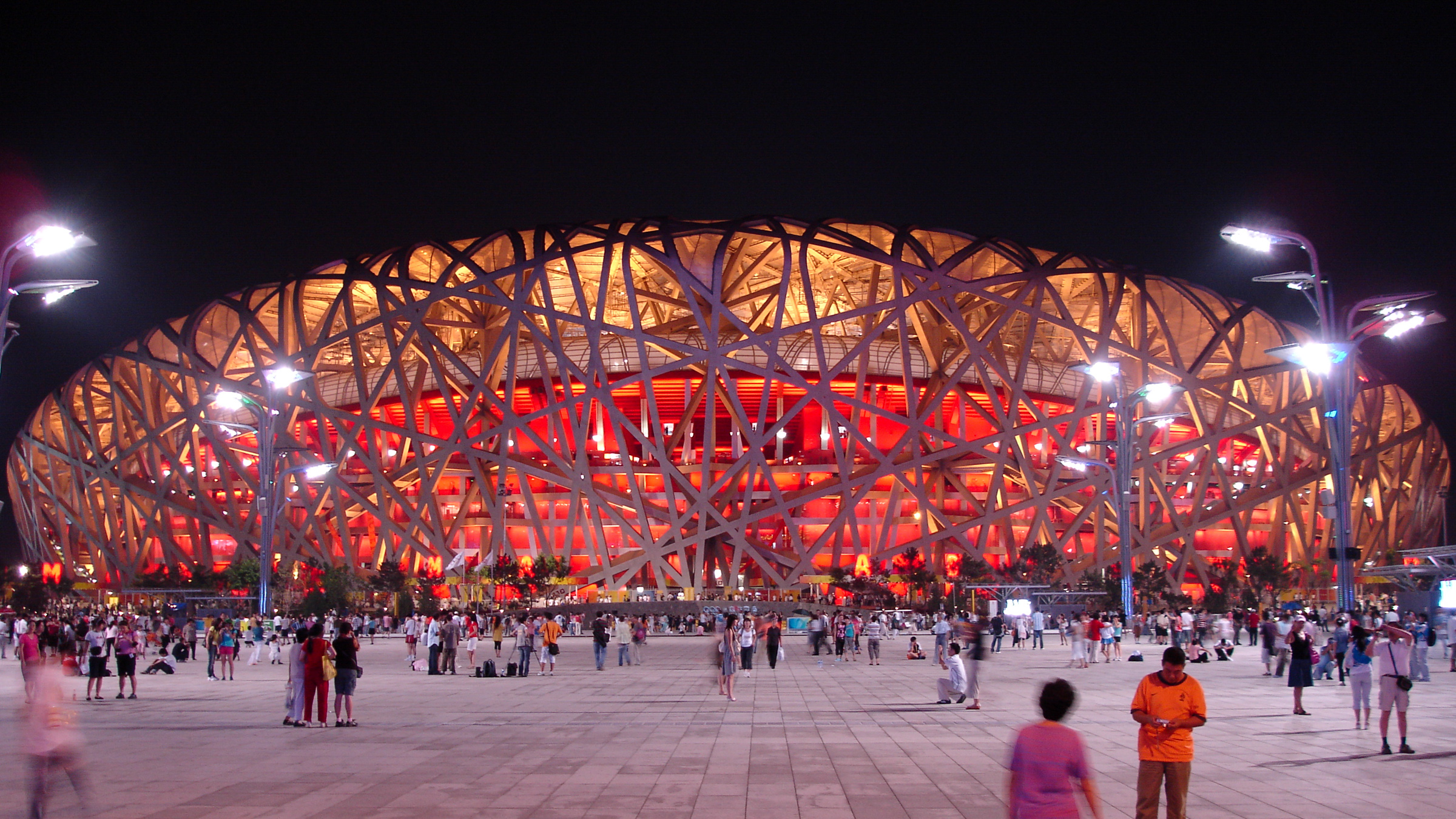
Bird's nest at night during the 2008 Beijing Summer Olympic Games

== History ==
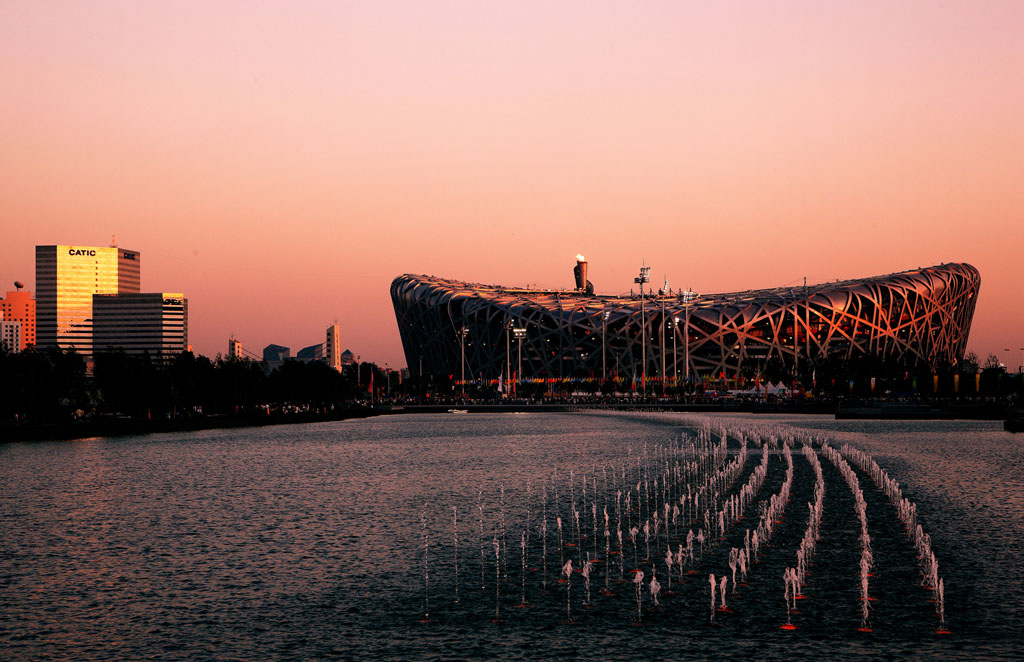
Bird's Nest in 2008

Located at the Olympic Green in Beijing, the stadium cost US$428 million. The design was awarded to a submission from the Swiss architecture firm Herzog & de Meuron in April 2003 after a bidding process that included 13 final submissions. The design, which originated from the study of Chinese ceramics, implemented steel beams in order to hide supports for the retractable roof; giving the stadium the appearance of a bird's nest. Leading Chinese artist Ai Weiwei was the artistic consultant on the project. The retractable roof was later removed from the design after inspiring the stadium's most recognizable aspect. Ground was broken on 24 December 2003 and the stadium officially opened on 28 June 2008. A shopping mall and a hotel are planned to be constructed to increase use of the stadium, which has had trouble attracting events, football and otherwise, after the Olympics.

=== Bidding ===
In 2001, before Beijing had been awarded the games, the city held a bidding process to select the best arena design. Multiple requirements including the ability for post-Olympics use, a retractable roof, and incredibly low maintenance costs, were required of each design. The entry list was narrowed to thirteen final designs. Of the final thirteen, Li Xinggang of China Architecture Design and Research Group (CADG), said after he placed the model of the "nest" proposal at the exhibition hall and saw the rival entries he thought to himself, "We will win this." The model was approved as the top design by a professional panel and later exhibited to the public. Once again, it was selected as the top design. The "nest scheme" design became official in April 2003.

=== Design ===
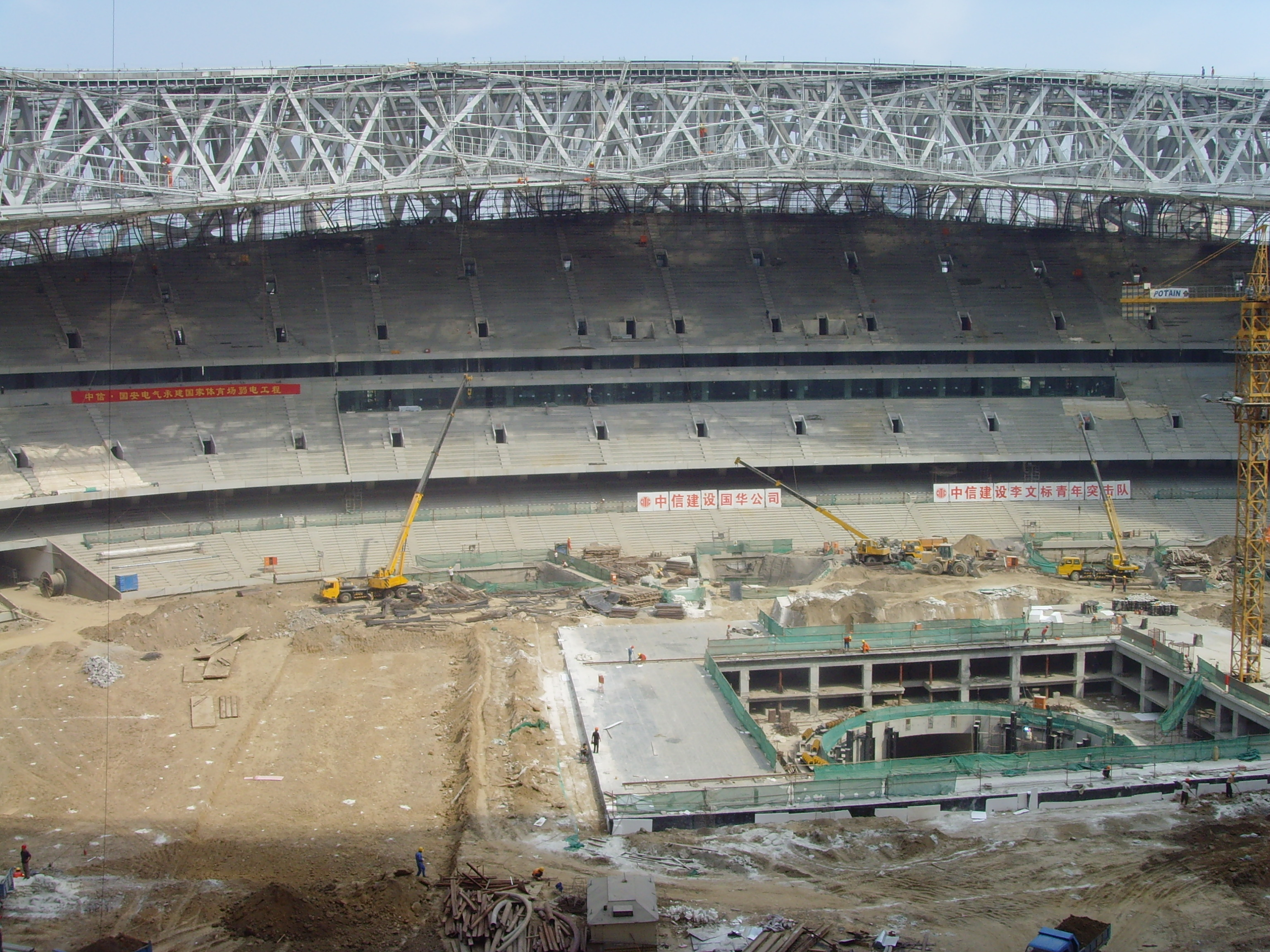
Under construction in September 2007

Why does a Chinese bowl or a Chinese window have this kind of pattern? Maybe the Chinese people like things to appear in this irregular way, but underneath there are very clear rules. The Bird's Nest developed in this way.

— Li Xinggang, head architect of CADG

Beijing National Stadium (BNS) was a joint venture among architects Jacques Herzog and Pierre de Meuron of Herzog & de Meuron, project architect Stefan Marbach and CADG, which was led by chief architect Li Xinggang. During their first meeting in 2003, at Basel, the group decided to do something unlike Herzog and de Meuron had traditionally designed. "China wanted to have something new for this very important stadium," Li stated. In an effort to design a stadium that was "porous" while also being "a collective building, a public vessel", the team studied Chinese ceramics. This line of thought brought the team to the "nest scheme". The stadium consists of two independent structures, standing 50 feet apart: a red concrete seating bowl and the outer steel frame around it.

In an attempt to hide steel supports for the retractable roof, required in the bidding process, the team developed the "random-looking additional steel" to blend the supports into the rest of the stadium. Twenty-four trussed columns encase the inner bowl, each one weighing 1,000 tons. Despite the random appearance of the Stadium, each half is nearly symmetrical. After a collapse of a roof at the Charles de Gaulle Airport, Beijing reviewed all major projects. It was decided to eliminate the retractable roof, the original inspiration for the "nest" design, as well as 9,000 seats from the design. The removal of the elements helped to bring the project under the reduced construction budget of $290 million, from an original $500 million. With the removal of the retractable roof, the building was lightened, which helped it stand up to seismic activity; however, the upper section of the roof was altered to protect fans from weather. Enerpac was granted the contract to perform the stage lifting and lowering of the stadium roof as part of the construction process. China National Electric Engineering Co Ltd and China National Mechanical Engineering Corporation lifted and welded the steel structure. Due to the stadium's outward appearance, it was nicknamed "The Bird's Nest". The phrase was first used by Herzog & de Meuron, though the pair still believes "there should be many ways of perceiving a building". The use is a compliment Li explained, "In China, a bird's nest is very expensive, something you eat on special occasions."

=== Construction ===
Construction of the stadium proceeded in several distinct phases, the first phase involving the construction of a concrete supporting structure upon the concrete foundations laid for the construction site. This was followed by the phased installation of the curved steel frame surrounding the stadium, which is largely self-supporting. This phased installation involved the interconnection of sections of the curved steel frame constructed in Shanghai and transported to Beijing for assembly and welding. The entire structure of interconnected sections was welded together as the primary means of interconnection used to assemble the entire surrounding nest structure. Upon removal of the supporting columns used for the purpose of expediting the assembly of the interconnecting sections, the completed nest structure as a whole settled approximately 27 cm to attain full stability before the interior design and construction of the stadium could be installed and completed.

=== Completion ===
Ground was broken, at the Olympic Green, for Beijing National Stadium on 24 December 2003. At its height, 17,000 construction workers worked on the stadium. Portraits of 143 migrant workers at the construction site were featured in the book Workers (Gong Ren) by artist Helen Couchman. On 1 January 2008, The Times reported that 10 workers had died throughout construction; despite denial from the Chinese government. However, in a story the following week, Reuters, with the support of the Chinese government, reported that only two workers had died. All 121,000 tons of steel were made in China. On 14 May 2008 the grass field of 7,811 square meters was laid in 24 hours. The field is a modular turf system by GreenTech ITM. Building the Beijing Olympic Field Beijing National Stadium officially opened at a ceremony on 28 June 2008.

== Features and events ==
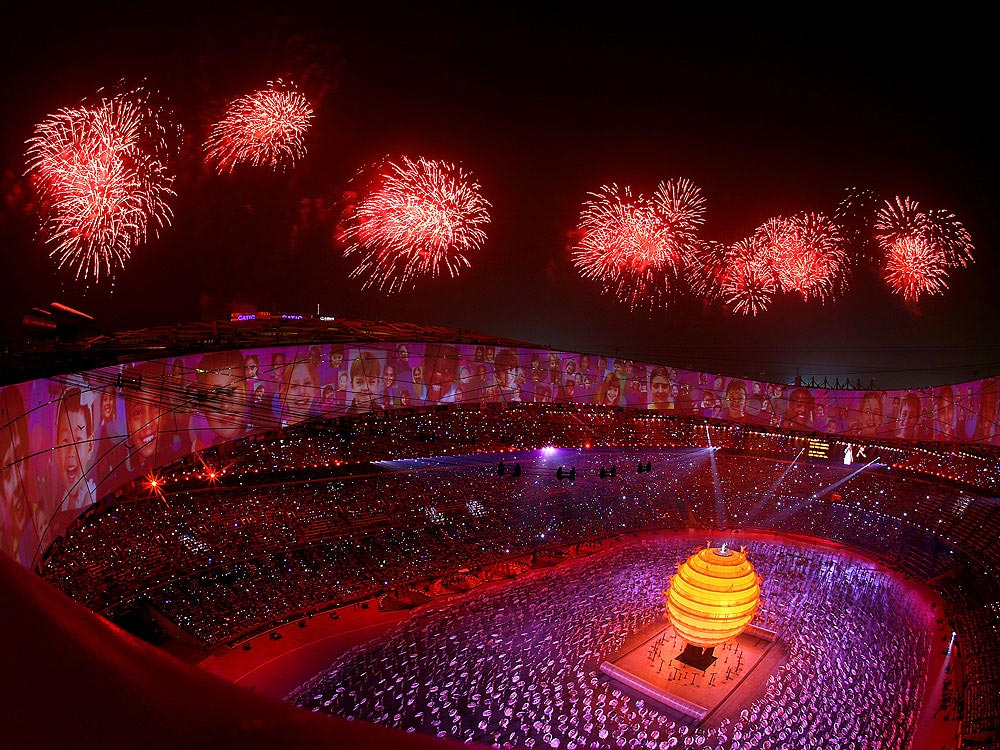
The 2008 Summer Olympics opening ceremony. The cauldron that would burn for the duration of the games is pictured on the left hand side, hidden in darkness away from the spectators.

The eastern and western stands of Beijing National Stadium are higher than northern and southern stands, in order to improve sightlines. A 24-hour-per-day rainwater collector is located near the stadium; after water is purified, it is used throughout and around the stadium. Pipes placed under the playing surface gather heat in the winter to warm the stadium and disperse heat in the summer to cool the stadium. The stadium's design originally planned to have capacity of 100,000 people; however, 9,000 were removed during a simplification of the design. The new total of 91,000 was shaved further when 11,000 temporary seats were removed after the 2008 Summer Olympics; decreasing the stadium's capacity to current 80,000. The farthest seat is 460 feet (140 meters) from center field. Temperature and airflow of every surface were optimized to increase ventilation.

Beijing National Stadium hosted the opening and closing ceremonies, athletic events, and football final of the 2008 Summer Olympics from 8 to 24 August 2008. The stadium also hosted the opening and closing ceremonies and athletic events of the 2008 Summer Paralympics from 6 to 17 September 2008. Though designed for track and field events of the Olympics, the stadium continued to host sporting events, such as football, afterwards. A shopping mall and a hotel, with rooms overlooking the field, are planned to help increase use after the Olympics. Li stated, "This will become the most important public space in Beijing."

Although ignored by the Chinese media, design consultant Ai Weiwei has voiced his anti-Olympics views and distanced himself from the project, saying, "I've already forgotten about it. I turn down all the demands to have photographs with it," and that it is part of a "pretend smile" of bad taste.

=== Football ===
China men's and women's teams have not played any matches since the opening of the stadium.

On its first anniversary, 8 August 2009, the stadium hosted a performance of the opera Turandot, and the 2009 Supercoppa Italiana (Italian Super Cup) final, the traditional curtain raiser to the Italian football league season. In August 2011, the Bird's Nest once again hosted the Supercoppa Italiana, the stadium's second in three years, and also in 2012.

The Beijing Guo'an football club was scheduled to play at the stadium, but later backed out of their agreement, citing the embarrassment of using an 80,000+ seat venue for games that routinely draw only slightly more than 10,000.

In July 2010, the stadium hosted a friendly football match between Football League Championship team Birmingham City and Beijing Guoan as a part of Birmingham's pre-season trip to China, homeland of the club's owner Carson Yeung. Birmingham City recorded a 1–0 victory in the game.

Arsenal and Manchester City played each other in the inaugural 'China Cup', a one-off match in Beijing's played on 27 July 2012. Manchester City won the match with a score of 2–0.

On 25 July 2016 Manchester City were scheduled to meet Manchester United as part of the 2016 International Champions Cup. However the game was cancelled due to heavy rain soaking the pitch, poor pitch conditions due to fungus and the pitch being relaid with turf.

On 22 July 2017, Arsenal and Chelsea played against each other in a friendly match.

After China became the host of the 2023 AFC Asian Cup on 4 June 2019 which the stadium was originally intended as the Beijing venue, but CFA chose Workers' Stadium on 4 January 2020 instead. However, on 14 May 2022, AFC announced that China would not be able to host the tournament due to the exceptional circumstances caused by the COVID-19 pandemic.

=== Other sports events ===
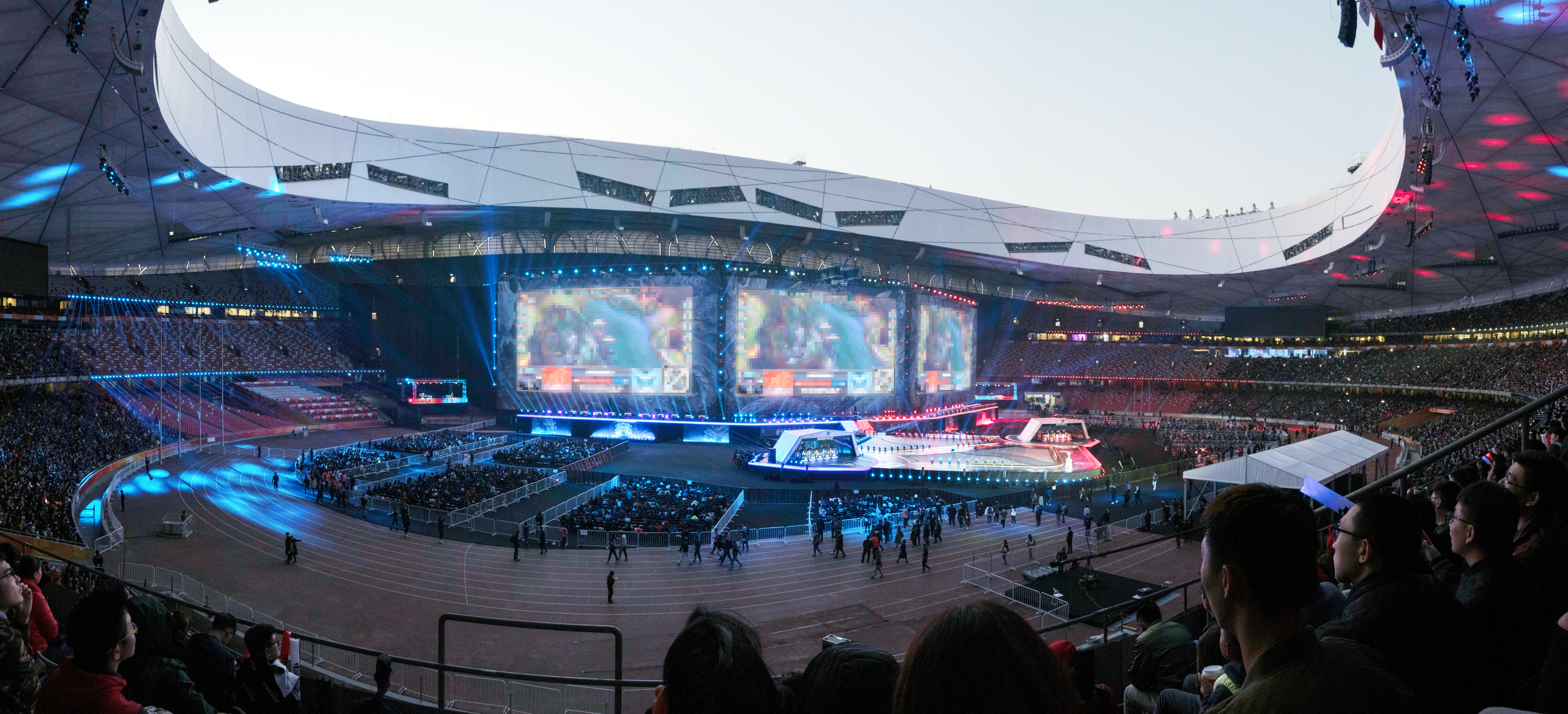
The stage for the 2017 League of Legends World Championship finals between SK Telecom T1 and Samsung Galaxy

The stadium hosted the 2009 Race of Champions motor racing carnival. In 2014 and 2015, the FIA Formula E Championship motor racing series hosted the Beijing ePrix at the Beijing Olympic Park.

On 1 November 2010, the IAAF announced that the 2015 World Championships in Athletics would take place at the Beijing National Stadium. and the event will return to the same stadium in 2027.

On 29 July 2017, the stadium hosted Monster Jam and the Stadium Super Trucks, marking the first Chinese race for both racing series. Chinese driver Li Ya Tao was among the ten drivers competing in the Stadium Super Truck race.

On 4 November 2017, the stadium hosted the League of Legends World Championship 2017 Finals.

=== Concerts ===
Date	Artist	Tour/Concert Name	Notes
25 July 2004	Whitney Houston	Soul Divas Tour	Only Houston performed at Asian stops
1 May 2009	Jackie Chan and more than 100 artists from mainand China, Hong Kong and Taiwan	Descendants of the Dragon: Jackie Chan and Friends Concert	First large-scale event
30 June 2009	Song Zuying	Bird's Nest Summer Concert	First act to hold a solo concert. Special guests: Jay Chou, Placido Domingo, Lang Lang
1 May 2011	Rock Records artists	Rock Records 30th Anniversary Concert	First act to hold a concert with four-sided stage
18 June 2011	Bo Jin	Singing for the Party and Saluting the Motherland Concert	Special guests：Li Shuangjiang, Phoenix Legend, Bian Xiaozhen, Geng Lianfeng, Geng Weihua, Li Qiong
14 April 2012	Wang Leehom	MUSIC-MAN II World Tour	
29–30 April 2012	Mayday	MAYDAY NOW-HERE World Tour	First act to hold 2 consecutive concerts
17 August 2013	Mayday	MAYDAY NOW-HERE World Tour	
19 October 2013	S.M. Entertainment artists	SMTown Live World Tour III	Artists: Kangta, BoA, TVXQ, Super Junior (Super Junior-M), Girls' Generation, SHINee, f(x), EXO, Zhang Liyin, and Tasty
14 June 2014	Wang Leehom	MUSIC-MAN II World Tour	
2 August 2014	Wang Feng	Peak Storm Coming Tour	
25 October 2014	K-pop artists	MBC Korean Music Wave Concert	
23 June 2016	Sun Nan	Asuka Graduation Party Concert	Special guests：Andy Hui、Tan Weiwei、Dino Lee、Nick Chou
25–26 June 2016	Tommy Tallarico and Jack Wall	Video Games Live	
26–28 August 2016	Mayday	Just Rock It!!! World Tour	First act to hold 3 consecutive concerts
21–22 October 2016	Eason Chan	ANOTHER EASON's LIFE World Tour	
7 July 2017	Wang Feng	Years World Tour	
18–19 August 2017	Mayday	Life Tour	
23 September 2017	Huang Kuo-lun	Nothing is Impossible Bird's Nest Concert	Special guests: Emil Chau, G.E.M., Kim Jimun, Huang Qishan
11 August 2018	Jason Zhang	Future Live Tour	
24–26 August 2018	Mayday	Life Tour – Bird's Nest Special Edition	
8–9 September 2018	Hua Chenyu	2016 Mars Concert Tour	
10 August 2019	Jason Zhang	Future Live Tour	
23–25 August 2019	Mayday	Just Rock It!!! World Tour	
26–28 May 2023	Mayday	Mayday Fly to 2023 Tour	First act to hold 6 consecutive concerts
31 May; 1, 3 June 2023	Mayday	MAYDAY NOW-HERE World Tour	First act to hold 6 consecutive concerts
11–13 August 2023	Joker Xue	Extraterrestrial World Tour	
25–27 August 2023	Jason Zhang	Future Live – Yao Beidou Tour	
9–10 September 2023	Hua Chenyu	2023 Mars Concert Tour	
22–24 September 2023	JJ Lin	JJ20 World Tour	
20 April 2024	Li Ronghao	Free Soul World Tour	
4–5 May 2024	Phoenix Legend	2024 Good Luck and Good Fortune Tour	
18–19, 21–22, 24–26, 30 May; 1 June 2024	Mayday	#5525 Back to That Day Tour	First act to hold 10 consecutive concerts
15 June 2024	Karen Mok	The Big Big Show Concert	
29–30 June 2024	Jeff Chang	Future Ultimate World Tour	
12–14, 17, 19–20 July 2024	Joker Xue	Extraterrestrial World Tour	
2–4, 6–7, 9–11 August 2024	Jason Zhang	Future Live To 1982 Tour	
22–25 August 2024	G.E.M.	I Am Gloria World Tour	First act to hold 4 consecutive concerts
7–8 September 2024	Hua Chenyu	2024 Mars Tour	
21–22 September 2024	Zhou Shen	9.29 Hz 10th Anniversary Concert Tour	
26 October 2024	Xu Song	The Breathing Wilderness Tour	
21–23 March 2025	Silence Wang	Silence Wang 2025 Concert Tour One Hundred Thousand Volts 2.0	Special guests: Li Ronghao, Miriam Yeung, David Tao
5–6 April 2025	A-Mei	ASMR World Tour	
27–29 June, 4–6, 11–13 July 2025	JJ Lin	JJ20 FINAL LAP World Tour	Special guests: Ele, Tarcy Su, Lay Zhang，Nicky Lee，A-Lin, Will Pan, Jeff Chang, Cyndi Wang, Stefanie Sun
25–27 July, 1–3, 6, 8–10, 15–17 August 2025	Mayday	#5525 Back to That Day Tour	First act to hold 13 consecutive concerts
29–30 August 2025	Roy Wang	Under Universe Tour	Youngest Act To Perform At Bird's Nest (24 Years Old)
19–21 September 2025	David Tao	Soul Power II World Tour	
6–7 October 2025	Lay Zhang	GRANDLINE 5· Monkey King Rocking The Heavenly Palace Tour	
26–28 June 2026	Jay Chou	Carnival II World Tour	3
10–12, 17–19, 24–26, 31 July and 1–2 August 2026	Joker Xue	The King of Beasts Tour	First usage of the wire rigging track since Li Ning lighting the 2008 Summer Olympics cauldron.

From 2014 to 2022, the finals for the Chinese singing competition The Voice of China, later re-branded as Sing! China, were held at the stadium. The finals were usually held on either 7 October or on a Sunday of the Golden Week to commemorate the event.

=== Pageants ===
In 4th quarter of 2017, this stadium is also open for both local and international pageant events.

=== Post-Olympics legacy ===
On 12 January 2009 the venue's owners announced plans for the stadium to anchor a shopping and entertainment complex. These plans, having been developed by operator CITIC Group, were projected to take three to five years to achieve. The stadium also continues to function as a tourist attraction, while hosting sports and entertainment events. However, by 2013 the stadium had fallen into visual disrepair and was criticized as appearing rusty and neglected by visitors to Beijing.

In 2009, the stadium was the site of a Pit Stop for the double-length penultimate leg in the 14th season of The Amazing Race. In 2010, an Olympic-themed Detour was held here in the fifth leg of the first season of The Amazing Race: China Rush. Later in 2016, the first leg of the third season of The Amazing Race China featured a Roadblock where a team member reenacted a dancing segment from the opening ceremony.

The National Stadium was intended to be a Monument of New China, expected to be visited by millions of tourists and showcased through an array of media representations.

In spite of the lack of significant events, the stadium appears to be quite profitable, drawing some 20,000 to 30,000 people a day at the price of a 50 yuan admission. In 2010 it was used as a snow theme park. The venue costs approximately $9 million to maintain per year.

The stadium was used for the finals of the 2017 League of Legends World Championship. This included performances by Jay Chou.

The stadium was used to host "The Great Journey", an art performance marking the 100th Anniversary of the Chinese Communist Party on 1 July 2021.

=== 2022 Winter Olympics ===
The stadium was used for the opening and closing ceremonies of 2022 Winter Olympics and 2022 Winter Paralympics. It is the only stadium to host both the Summer and Winter Olympics and Paralympics opening and closing ceremonies.

== Gallery ==
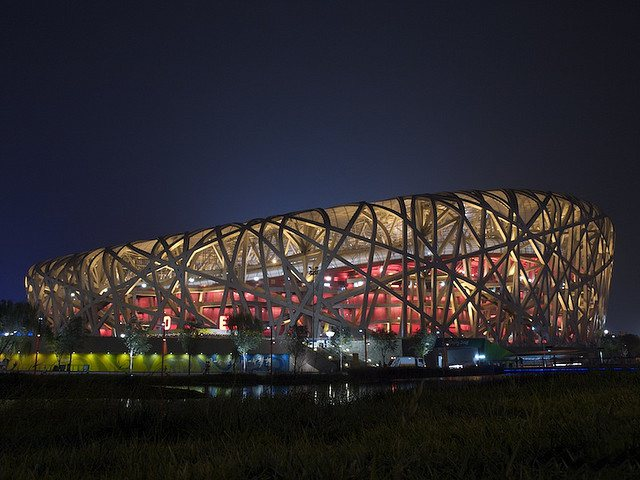
The Beijing National Stadium at night during the Summer Olympics

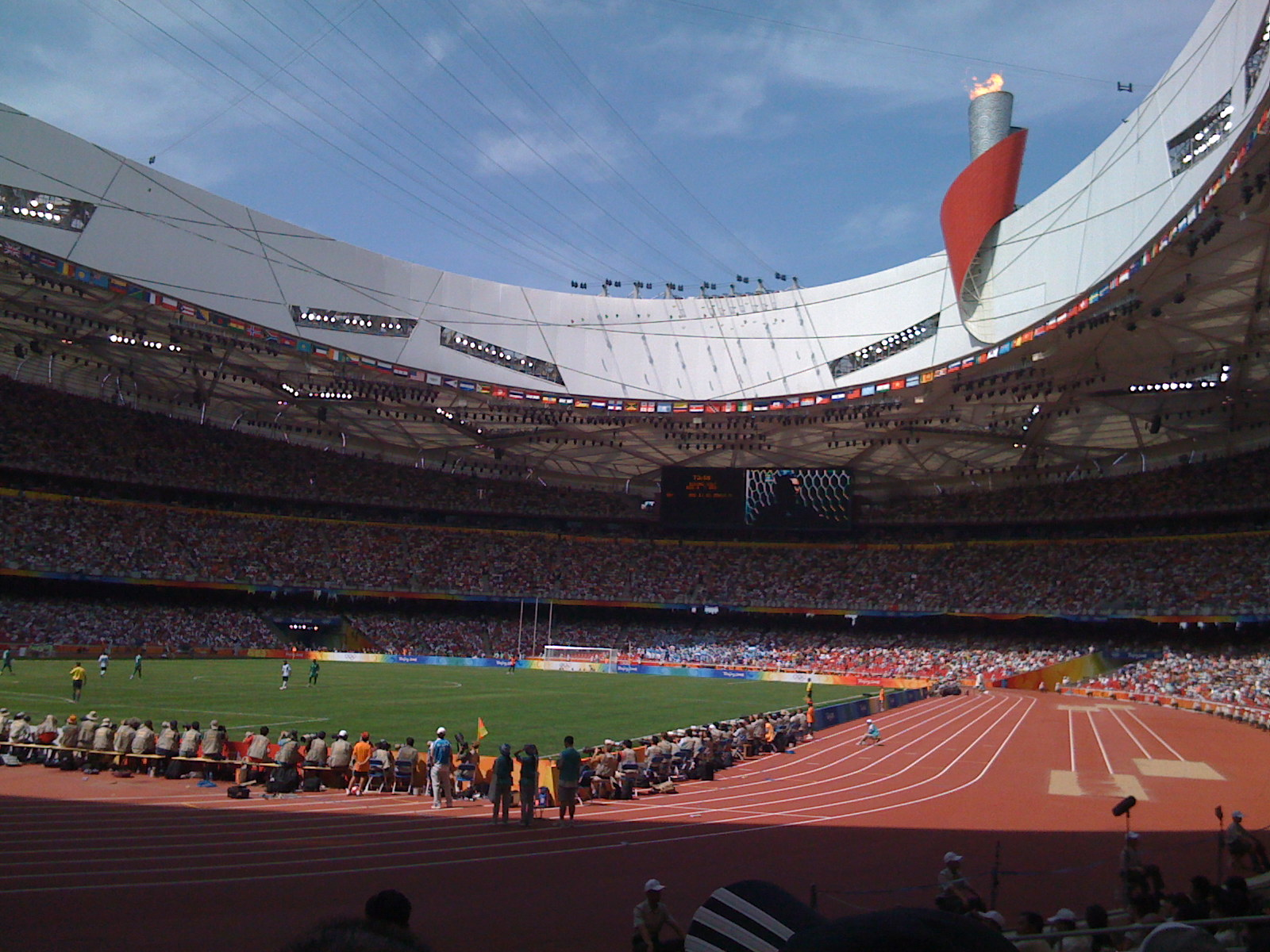
Inside of the stadium during the 2008 Summer Olympics

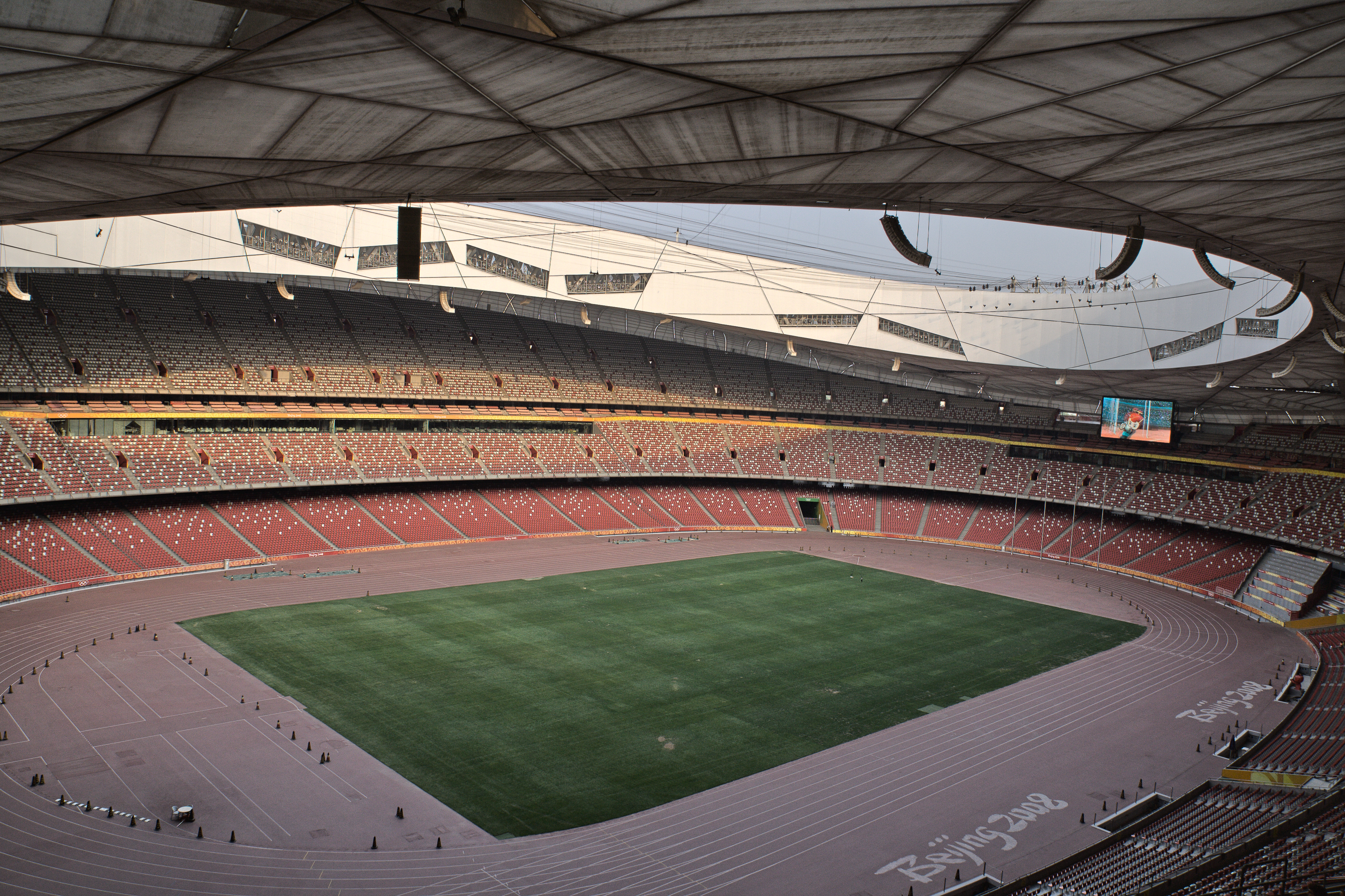
Interior view of the stadium

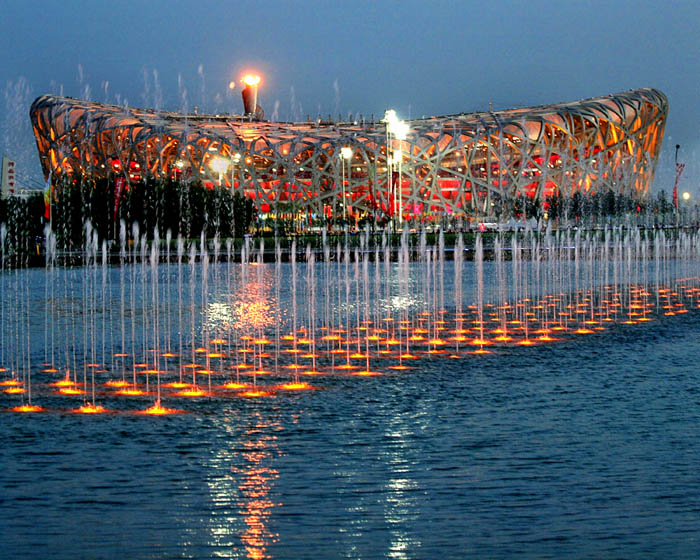
2008 Summer Olympics flame

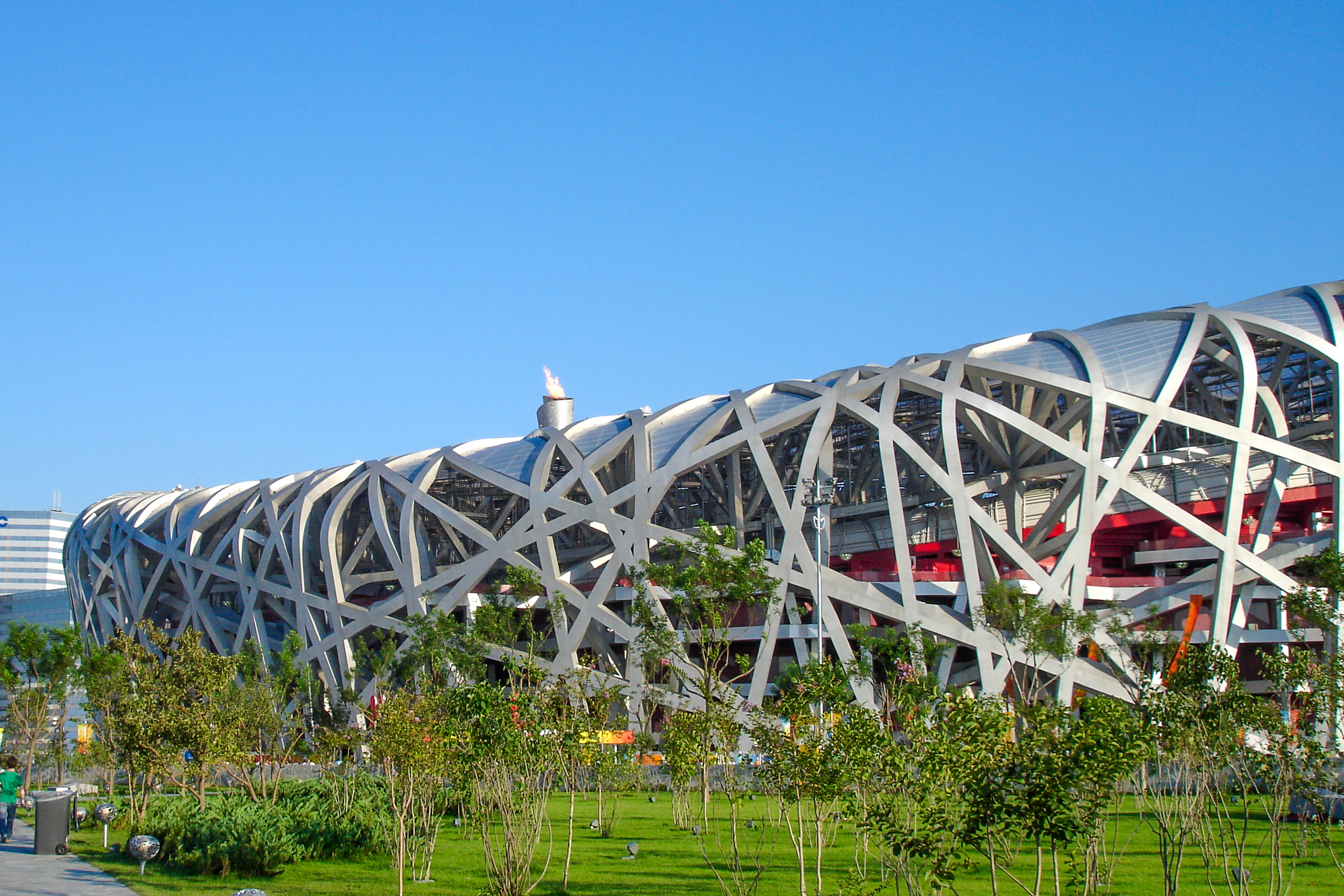
2008 Summer Olympics flame

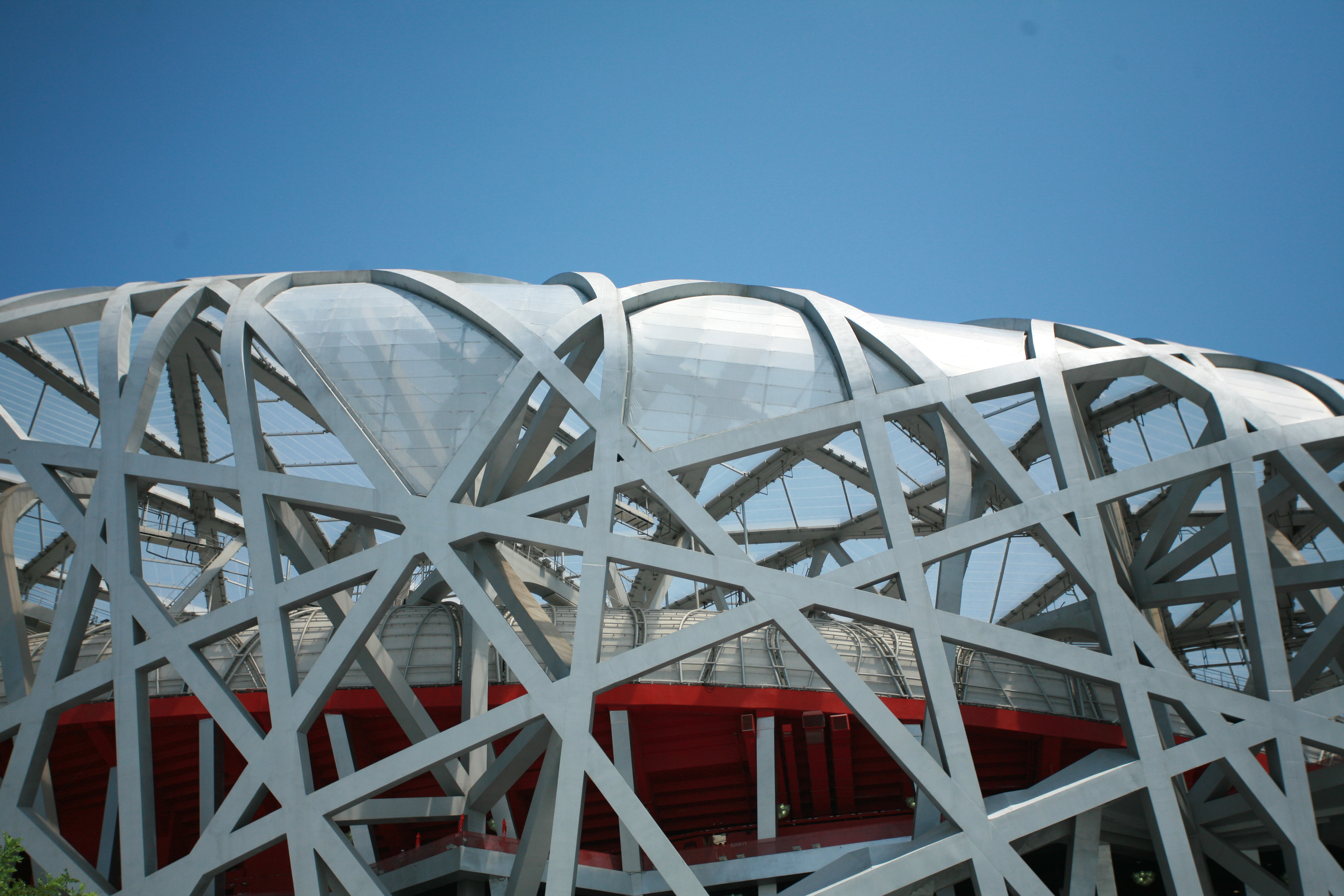
Detail of the exterior

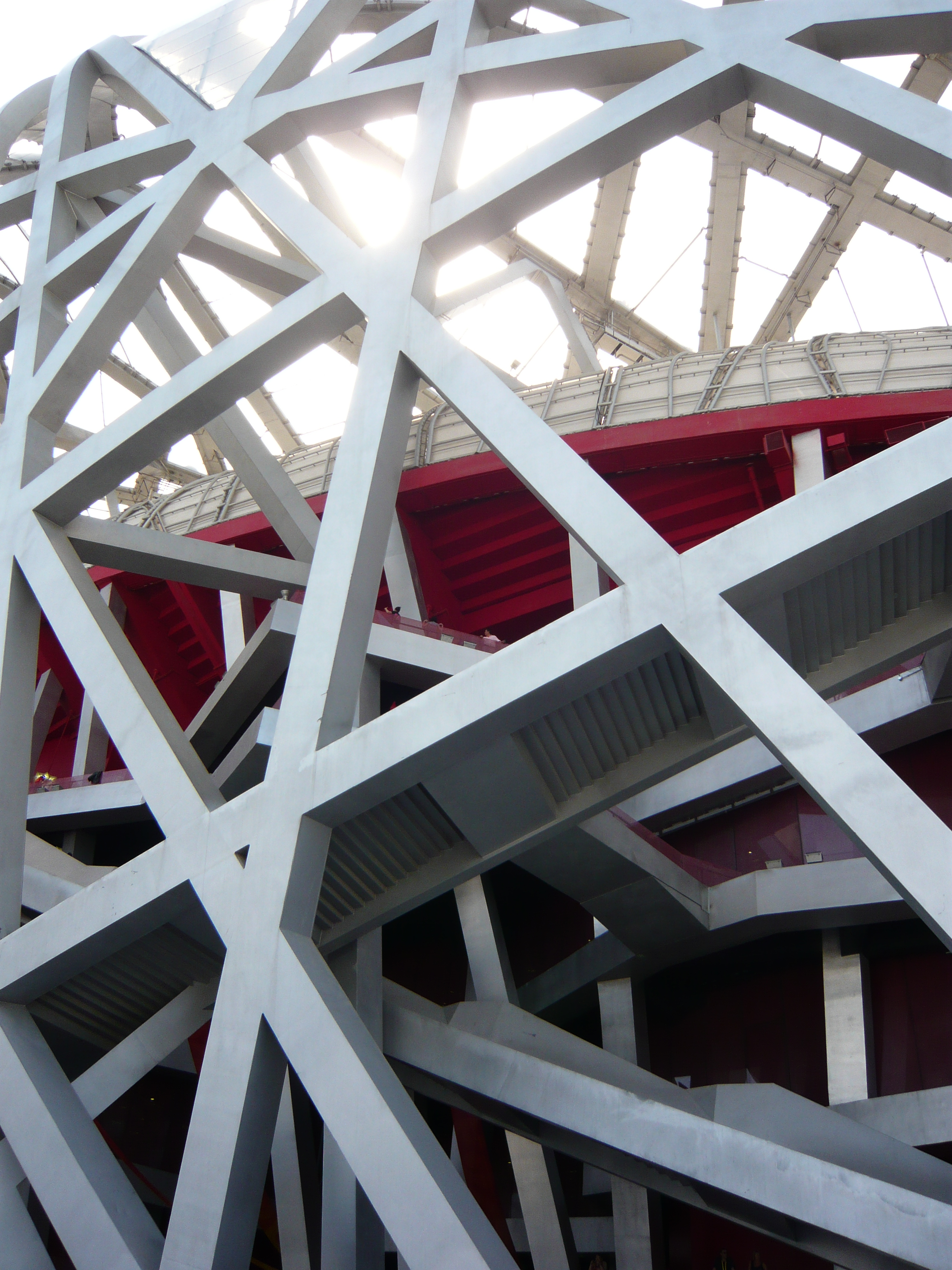
Architectural detail of the stadium's exterior

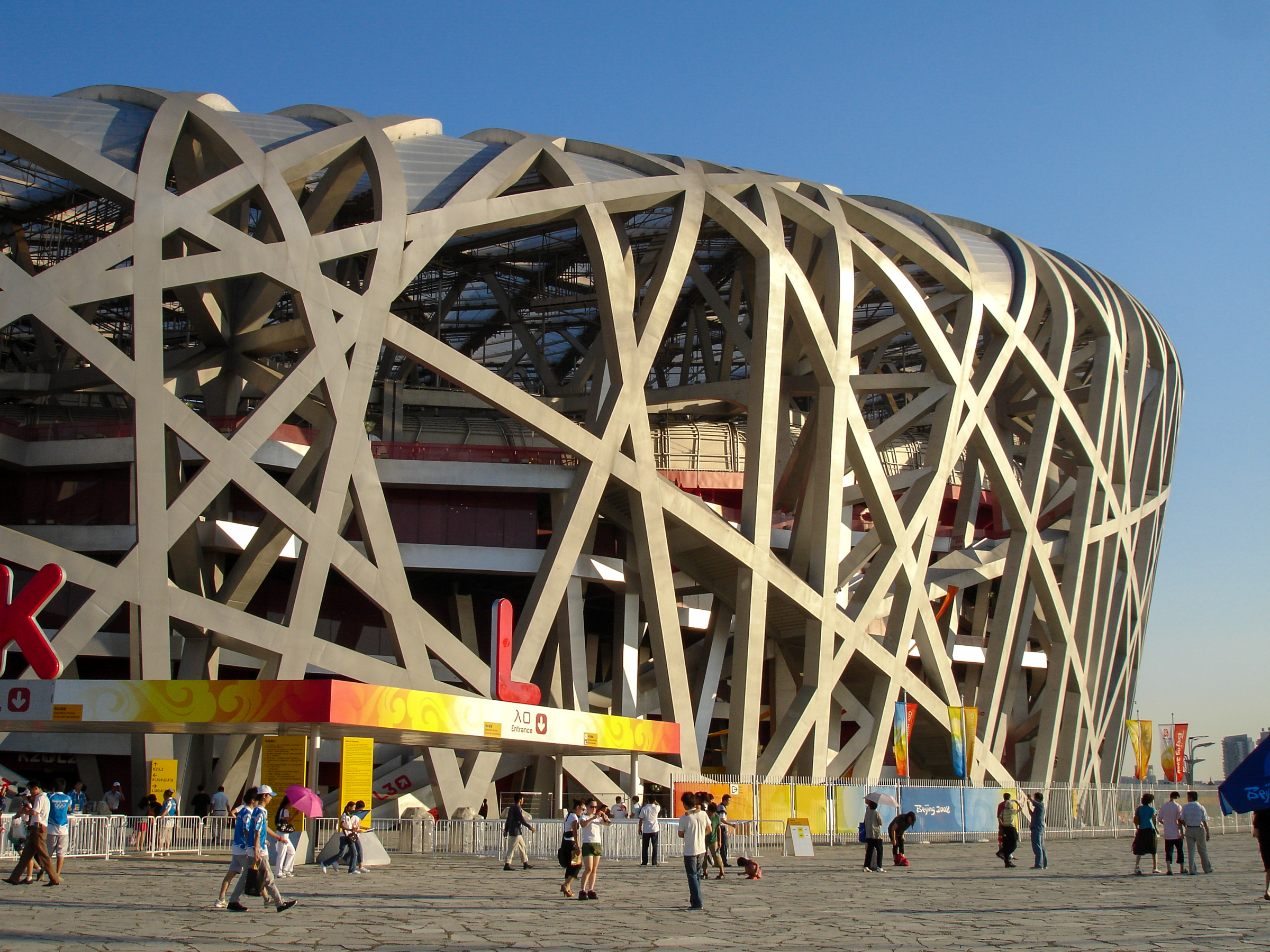
Entrance during the 2008 Summer Olympics

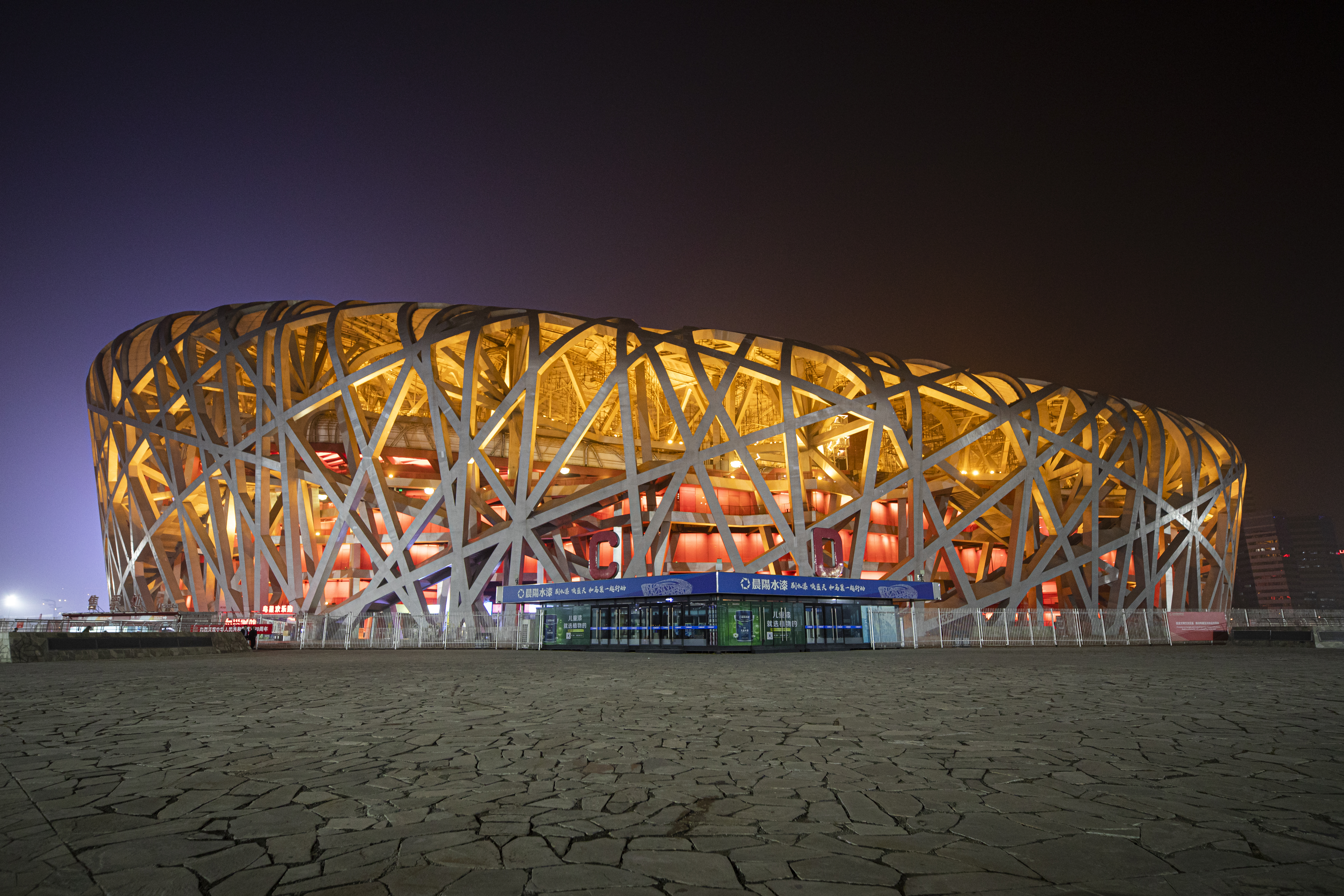
Beijing National Stadium at night

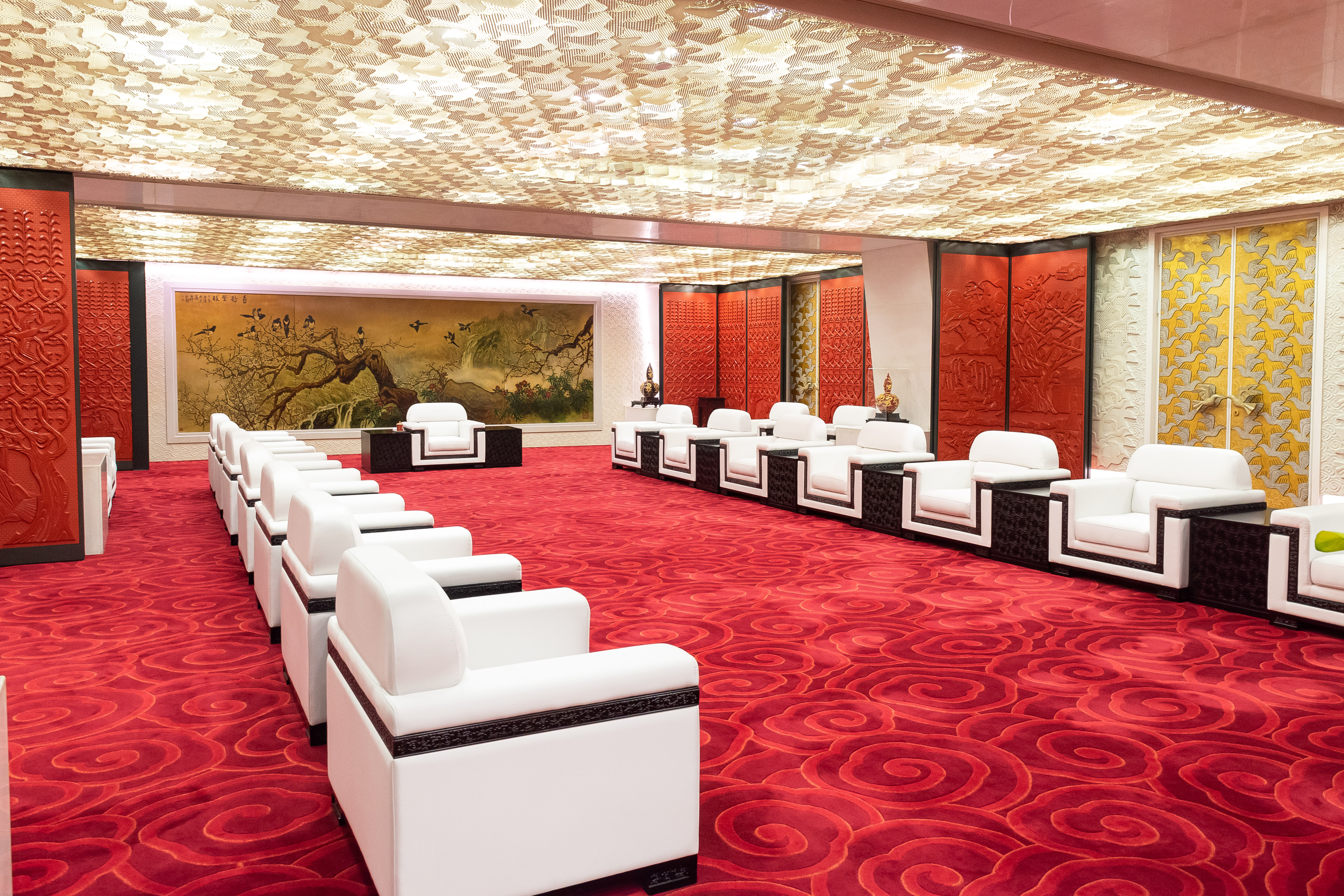
Golden hall, the lounge for national leaders

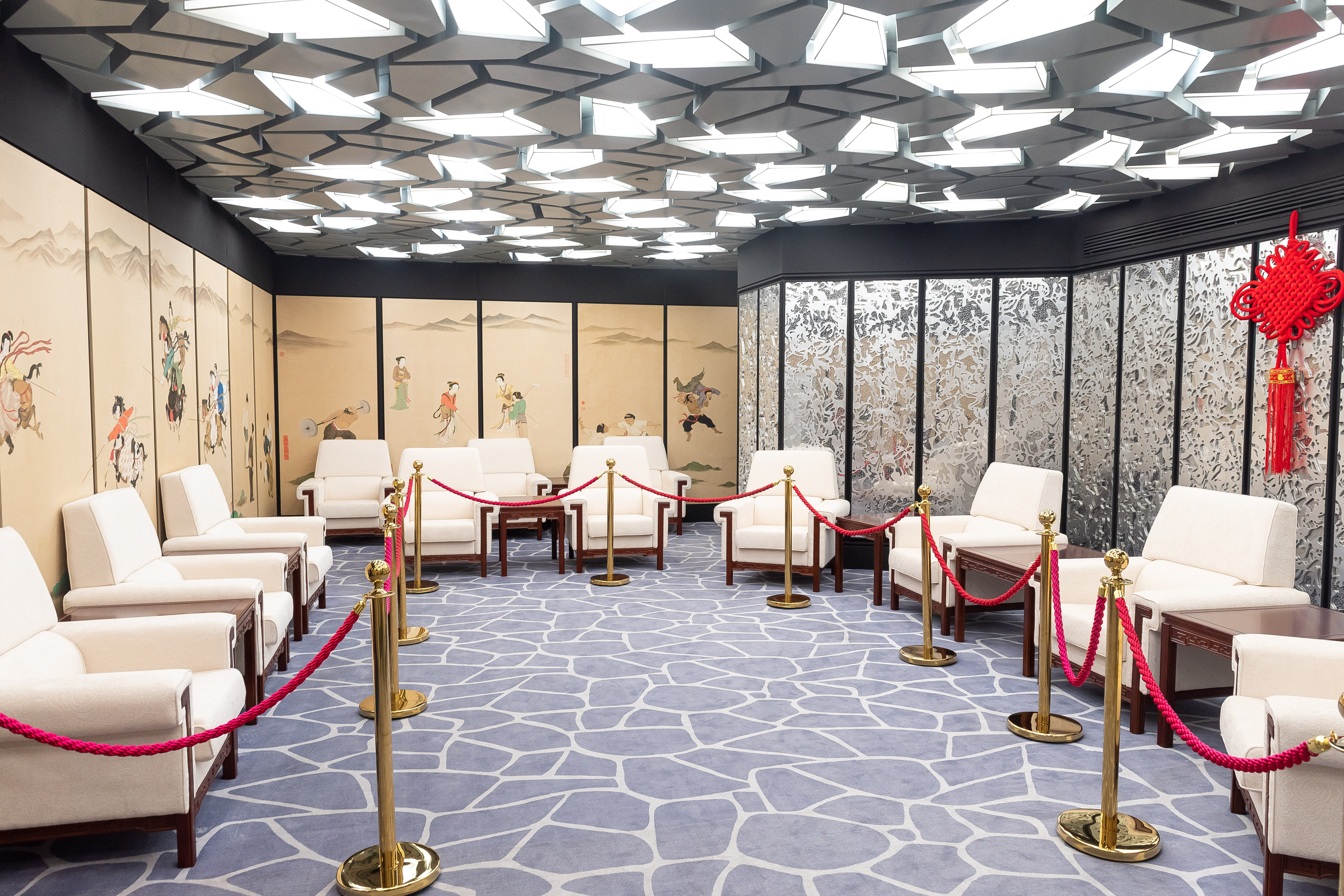
Silver hall, the lounge for IOC officials

== See also ==
- Workers' Stadium
- Lists of stadiums
- Stadium diplomacy

Preceded by Olympic Stadium; Athens	Summer Olympics; Opening and closing ceremonies venue (Olympic Stadium); 2008	Succeeded by Olympic Stadium; London
Preceded by Olympic Stadium; Athens	Summer Olympics; Athletics competitions Main venue 2008	Succeeded by Olympic Stadium; London
Preceded by Olympic Stadium; Athens	Summer Olympics; Men's football gold medal match venue 2008	Succeeded by Wembley Stadium; London
Preceded by Olympic Stadium; Athens	Summer Paralympics; Opening and closing ceremonies venue (Olympic Stadium); 2008	Succeeded by Olympic Stadium; London
Preceded by Olympic Stadium; Athens	Summer Olympics; Athletics competitions Main venue 2008	Succeeded by Olympic Stadium; London
Preceded by Luzhniki Stadium; Moscow	World Championships in Athletics; Main venue 2015	Succeeded by London Stadium; London
Preceded by Staples Center; Los Angeles	League of Legends World Championship; Final venue 2017	Succeeded by Incheon Munhak Stadium; Incheon
Preceded by Pyeongchang Olympic Stadium; Pyeongchang	Winter Olympics; Opening and closing ceremonies venue (Olympic Stadium); 2022	Succeeded by San Siro, Milan (opening); Verona Arena, Verona (closing)
Preceded by Pyeongchang Olympic Stadium; Pyeongchang	Winter Paralympics; Opening and closing ceremonies venue (Olympic Stadium); 2022	Succeeded by Verona Arena, Verona (opening); Stadio Olimpico Del Ghiaccio, Cortina (closing)
