= Kalyan Chaubey =

Indian footballer and politician

Personal information
- Date of birth: 16 December 1976 (age 49)
- Place of birth: Kolkata, West Bengal, India
- Height: 1.75 m (5 ft 9 in)
- Position: Goalkeeper

Youth career
- Tata Football Academy

Senior career*
Years	Team	Apps	(Gls)
1996–1997	Mohun Bagan	27	
1997–1999	East Bengal	67	
1999–2000	Mohun Bagan		
2000–2001	Bengal Mumbai	17	
2001–2003	Salagaocar	53	
2003–2005	Mahindra United		
2005–2007	JCT		
2007–2009	Mumbai FC		
2009–2010	Salagaocar		
11th President of All India Football Federation
Incumbent
Assumed office 2 September 2022
Preceded by	Praful Patel
Personal details
Party	Bharatiya Janata Party
- * Club domestic league appearances and goals

Kalyan Chaubey (born 16 December 1976) is an Indian politician of Bharatiya Janata Party and a former professional football goalkeeper. He is the current president of the All India Football Federation.

== Football career ==
=== Playing career ===
Chaubey graduated from Tata Football Academy in 1995. He played as a goalkeeper and won the award – "Indian Goalkeeper of the Year" – in 1997–98 and 2001–02. He was member of the Indian teams at U-17 Asian Youth Championship 1994 in Iran and U-20 Asian Youth Championship 1996 in South Korea in 1996, the India national team from 1999 to 2006.

He was part of the Indian team that won the SAFF Championship twice. He played the National Championship (Santosh Trophy) for five different states of Jharkhand, West Bengal, Goa, Punjab and Maharashtra. He played for Mohun Bagan AC, East Bengal FC, Salgaocar SC, Mahindra United, JCT Phagwara, and Mumbai FC as a goalkeeper. He had a short loan spell at Bangladesh Muktiyodha, Dhaka. He also played for East Bengal and Mohun Bagan from 1996 to 2000. In 2002, he trialled for the German club 2. Bundesliga side Karlsruher SC, and Verbandsliga Württemberg outfit VfR Heilbronn.

== Post-football career ==
After his retirement as a footballer, he had a brief modelling career. He also worked as a sports commentator and analyst for Sony, Ten TV and Start Sports Network for tournaments like Calcutta Football League and the Indian Super League. He was the CEO of Mohun Bagan academy from 2010 to 2013. He was also a co-ordinator for the GOALZ Project 2012, developed by Kolkata Police and British Council, to support underprivileged children.

== Sports administrative career ==
=== AIFF President and IOA Joint Secretary ===
On 2 September 2022, Chaubey was elected as the President of the All India Football Federation after his 33–1 victory over former India international footballer Bhaichung Bhutia. On 28 November 2022, he was elected unopposed as the join secretary of the Indian Olympic Association. He is also functioning as the acting CEO of the IOA till the appointment of the post.

==== Allegations of bribery ====
On 2 March 2024, AIFF principal legal advisor alleged misuses of federation funds by Kalyan Chaubey and allotment of broadcasting tenders for various AIFF competitions to a company close to the president, these allegations were denied by Chaubey. Few days later, The Asian Football Confederation (AFC) asked the former legal head to submit evidence and sought full case files from the AIFF. On 9 July 2024, one day before the Maniktala bypoll elections, Kunal Ghosh, a Trinamool Congress leader released an audio recording alleging that BJP candidate Kalyan Chaubey offered him a post in football administration in return for his help to win the election. Chaubey denied the allegations stating it was a courtesy call and the recording was edited.

=== Administrative performance timeline ===
Date	Statement/Action	Plan	Result	Ref.
8 September 2022	Expansion of women's football	introduce age-group league; introduce a minimum salary cap in the IWL	No age-group league for women's football initiated	
11 September 2022	MoU with Qatar FA	strategic alliance for the mutual benefit of football	None	
6 October 2022	MoU with Saudi FA	provision of technological support; organization and hosting of youth competitions for both men and women on a regular basis; exchange of football and governance experts	Only knockout stage of 2022–23 Santosh Trophy hosted in Saudi Arabia	
5 December 2022	2027 AFC Asian Cup host bid withdrawal	AIFF decided to withdraw their bid in order to build the foundations of proper footballing structure instead of hosting of big events as hosting requires big resources	India failed to qualify for the 2027 AFC Asian Cup during qualification	
3 July 2023	Restore Federation Cup	to revive and restore Federation Cup as the premier cup competition from the 2023–24 season	Not held, plan abandoned	
31 August 2023	Institutional League	starting the Institutional League as a competition for the institutional teams	Did not come to fruition	
September 2023	Hero MotoCorp title sponsorship of Indian football national tiers	continuation of title sponsorship of Indian men's and women's league and cup competitions	Failed to reach agreement with the organisation regarding sponsorship, leading to the end of Hero MotoCorp's association with Indian football, Indian national tiers organised without title sponsors since the 2023–24 season	
30 October 2023	MoU with CAFA	participation of Indian national teams across all age groups in both men's and women's competitions on an invitational basis; mutual benefits in all areas of football, with a specific focus on youth football, women's football, coach education, and refereeing	India NT participated in the 2025 CAFA Nations Cup; Age group men's or women's teams and senior women's team are yet to participate in CAFA tournaments	
15 November 2023	AIFF FIFA Academy	set up the AIFF-FIFA Talent Academy under the FIFA Talent Development Scheme	established at Bhubaneswar in Odisha	
6 January 2024	Introducing Additional Video Review System (AVRS)	participating in the trial of AVRS instead of looking for possibilities for VAR	Not implemented	
29 February 2024	U20 Men's National Championships	starting the National Championships for the U20 men's age group	started from the 2023–24 season	
22 March 2024	TW3 age test in national youth competitions	Application of TW3 age test across U13 and U15 competitions at the national level youth leagues	initiated in Junior Youth League and Sub-Junior Youth League from the 2024–25 season	
10 September 2024	Reintroduce India U20 team in I-League	Resume participation of India U20 team in I-League for game time and preparation for the 2027 Asian Cup and 2026 Asian Games, with exemption from promotion-relegation	Plan dropped; India U20 team failed to qualify for 2025 U-20 Asian Cup	
2 December 2024	Commercial rights of premier AIFF competitions	signed commercial rights agreement for I-League, I-League 2, IWL, Santosh Trophy and Rajmata Jijabai Trophy with Shrachi Sports	the broadcasting of the competitions to be streamed on SSEN app; broadcasting of 80% of I-League matches also awarded to Sony	
11 July 2025	Roadmap of Indian Women's Football post India's 2026 AFC Women's Asian Cup qualification	holding the 2025–26 Indian Women's League from September 2025 to January 2026; participation of India U20 in the IWL; India WNT to undergo 83 days of preparation camps, conducted in three phases; India WNT to play 10-12 international friendlies and 5-7 matches with domestic teams; each player is projected to play at least 30 matches between August and February, combining both club and international commitments; 2025–26 Rajmata Jijabai Trophy to be held after the continental tournament for uninterrupted WNT preparation	unable to host 2025–26 Indian Women's League as per roadmap, IWL started much later from 20 December 2025 with only one phase; India U20 were promoted from IWL 2, but later were included in the IWL; camps held only during the October and November FIFA windows; India WNT have only played 2 FIFA and 1 exhibition friendlies in the October window and no matches were organised in the November window; only certain players have played international friendlies and AFC club games, while league only started from December 2025; 2025–26 Rajmata Jijabai Trophy was held before continental tournament contrary to the roadmap	
November/December 2025	Indian Super League tender	to monetise commercial rights of ISL	did not attract any bids, men's top tier season yet to start	
December 2025	I-League, I-League 2, I-League 3 tender	to monetise commercial rights of I-League tiers	did not attract any bids, men's lower tiers season yet to start	
December 2025	IWL, IWL 2 tender	to monetise commercial rights of IWL tiers	only one bid received, but AIFF failed to reach agreement with the bidder, women's top tier started without title sponsor	

== Political career ==
In 2015, he turned to politics and joined the Bhartiya Janata Party (BJP). He was nominated by the BJP as its candidate for the Krishnanagar (Lok Sabha constituency) in the 2019 Indian general election but lost to Mahua Moitra of the Trinamool Congress (TMC). In 2021, he contested as a BJP candidate for the Maniktala constituency in the 2021 West Bengal Legislative Assembly election where he lost to Sadhan Pandey of the TMC. In 2024, he again contested from the same constituency in the bypolls after the death of Pandey. However, he lost by a huge margin to the widowed wife, Supti Pandey, who polled nearly 4 times the votes of Chaubey.

== Personal life ==
Kalyan Chaubey is the son-in-law of former longtime Mohan Bagan general secretary Anjan Mitra.

== Honours ==
India

- SAFF Championship: 1999, 2005
- South Asian Games Bronze medal: 1999

Individual

- Indian Goalkeeper of the Year: 1997–98, 2001–02
