= Worker =

Worker may refer to:

- Worker, a person who performs work for a living
- Laborer, a person who performs unskilled physical labour, especially in construction
- Worker, a member of the working class
- Worker, a member of the proletariat
- Worker, a member of the workforce
  - Designation of workers by collar color lists various categories of workers
- Worker, a minister in the Two by Twos nondenominational Christian sect
- Worker animal, a draught (draft) or service animal
- Worker bee, a non-reproductive female in eusocial bees
- Worker Party, a name used by multiple political parties throughout the world
- Web worker, a background script run in a web browser

== Surname ==
- George Worker (born 1989), New Zealand cricketer
- Norman Worker (1927–2005), British comic book writer
- Rupert Worker (1896–1989), New Zealand cricketer

== Media ==
- The Worker (TV series), a 1960s TV sitcom starring Charlie Drake
- Workers (Gong Ren), a 2008 artist's book by Helen Couchman
- Workers: An Archaeology of the Industrial Age, a 1993 photo essay and book by Sebastião Salgado

== See also ==
- Co-worker (disambiguation)
