= GreenTech ITM =

- Company type: Private
- Industry: green roof, stadium, athletic fields
- Headquarters: Richmond, Virginia, United States
- Products: modular natural turf, green roof, roof garden, urban agriculture
- Website: www.greentechitm.com

GreenTech ITM is an American-based company which designs and installs modular artificial turf and vegetative systems on athletic turf fields, rooftops, green roofs, urban agriculture, and golf courses. Its products have been used in sporting events, such as the artificial turf used in the Athens Olympic Stadium for the 2004 Olympic Games and the Bird's Nest Stadium for the 2008 Olympic Games.

== Projects ==
- Silvercup Studios, largest green roof in New York City
- Bird's Nest Stadium, Beijing
- Lane Stadium, Virginia Tech
- Spartan Stadium, Michigan State
- Francisco Montaner Stadium, Puerto Rico
- Caves Valley Golf Club, Owings Mills, Maryland
- Athens Olympic Stadium, Athens
- Giants Stadium, East Rutherford, New Jersey
- Luzhniki Stadium, Moscow
