= 2023 AFC Asian Cup bids =

Asian football cup bids

The bidding process for the 2023 AFC Asian Cup was the process by which the location for the 2023 AFC Asian Cup would be chosen as the hosts.

== First bidding process ==
The AFC Competitions Committee confirmed on 12 April 2016 that four countries expressed interest in hosting the 2023 AFC Asian Cup: China, Indonesia, South Korea and Thailand. Indonesia, however, was under FIFA suspension during that period. Those countries met the deadline to submit all documents on 31 March 2016. The winning bid was originally set to be announced at the AFC Congress in May 2018, but the congress was moved to 31 October. Later on, South Korea, Indonesia and Thailand withdrew for various reasons, thus China was designated to be the host on 4 June 2019, before the 69th FIFA Congress, in Paris, France.

=== Chinese bid ===
- China – In February 2013, China suggested interest in hosting the 2019 AFC Asian Cup. Nine cities, Beijing, Dalian, Nanjing, Xi'an, Chengdu, Qingdao, Changsha, Guangzhou and Wuhan, were suggested by the Chinese Football Association (CFA) as potential host cities for the tournament. However, in September 2013, the CFA withdrew its bid to focus on player development. In December 2015, the CFA confirmed their intention to bid for the 2023 AFC Asian Cup. China previously hosted the 2004 Asian Cup where they reached the final but lost 3–1 to neighbours Japan. It was reported that Beijing, Tianjin, Guangzhou, Nanjing, Xi'an, Wuhan, Chengdu, Qingdao, Shenyang, Changsha, Ningbo and Luoyang were suggested by the Chinese Football Association (CFA) as potential host cities for the tournament. Later, in March 2019, it was reported that after evaluation, China officially proposed to bid for the 2023 Asian Cup.

The following were the host cities and venues selected for China's bid:

Beijing	Nanjing	Shenyang	Wuhan
National Stadium	Nanjing Olympic Sports Center	Shenyang Olympic Sports Center Stadium	Wuhan Sports Center Stadium
Capacity: 80,000	Capacity: 61,443	Capacity: 60,000	Capacity: 60,000
Guangzhou	Location of the host cities of the 2023 China's bids.		Changsha
Tianhe Stadium	Location of the host cities of the 2023 China's bids.		Helong Stadium
Capacity: 56,000	Location of the host cities of the 2023 China's bids.		Capacity: 55,000
Tianjin	Location of the host cities of the 2023 China's bids.		Xi'an
Tianjin Olympic Centre Stadium	Location of the host cities of the 2023 China's bids.		Shaanxi Province Stadium
Capacity: 54,696	Location of the host cities of the 2023 China's bids.		Capacity: 50,100
Qingdao	Chengdu	Luoyang	Ningbo
Yizhong Sports Center	Chengdu Sports Center	Luoyang Stadium	Ningbo City Stadium
Capacity: 45,000	Capacity: 42,000	Capacity: 39,888	Capacity: 36,000

=== Cancelled bids ===
==== India ====
- India – India expressed their interest in hosting the competition having never hosted it before. The All India Football Federation was keen to host more international tournaments in the country including the 2020 FIFA U-20 Women's World Cup because of a major infrastructural development of football in the country, by virtue of being hosts for the 2017 FIFA U-17 World Cup and did bid for the 2019 FIFA U-20 World Cup but lost out to Poland. However, India submitted their expression of interest beyond the deadline that was set for March 2017. Possible host cities included Navi Mumbai, New Delhi, Bangalore, Kochi, Guwahati, Chennai, Kolkata, Margao, Pune and Jamshedpur. India later withdrew its bid in October 2018, and chose to focus on the 2020 FIFA U-17 Women's World Cup which India would have hosted before its deferral to 2021 and eventual cancellation due to the COVID-19 pandemic. Instead, the country would later be the host of the 2022 edition, which was later moved following the suspension of AIFF by FIFA. On 26 August 2022, FIFA lifted the ban from the AIFF.

==== Indonesia ====
- Indonesia – AFC accepted Indonesia as a candidate on 12 April 2016. Indonesia previously hosted in 2007, along with Thailand, Vietnam and Malaysia. The AFC announced on 6 July 2017 that Indonesia had withdrawn from bidding. In the same year, the country hosted the 2023 FIBA Basketball World Cup alongside fellow Asian nations Japan and the Philippines. However, with China's withdrawal, Indonesia again resubmitted the bid to host the competition, until it was withdrawn by the AFC due to security reasons.^{[see below]}

==== Thailand ====
- Thailand – Thailand previously hosted in 1972, and also co-hosted in 2007 along with Indonesia, Malaysia and Vietnam. On 21 July 2017, the Football Association of Thailand notified the AFC their decision to withdraw from bidding. Thailand expressed interest in bidding for the 2023 FIFA Women's World Cup but was not in the final list of countries that submitted their bids for the event which was awarded to Australia and New Zealand.

==== South Korea ====
- South Korea – South Korea expressed their interest in hosting the next tournament. South Korea last hosted in 1960, which was the second consecutive and last time they have won the tournament. The eight host cities were Suwon, Goyang, Hwaseong, Cheonan, Gwangju, Jeonju, Busan and Seogwipo. On 15 May 2019, South Korea withdrew their bid to focus on co-bidding for the 2023 FIFA Women's World Cup with North Korea. The joint bid was also withdrawn on 13 December, with no agreement made between FIFA and the South Korean government over the use of an organizing committee. Following China's withdrawal from hosting, South Korea again submitted its bid to host the competition until it was failed.^{[see below]}

=== Concerns and withdrawal ===
The tournament was originally scheduled to be held in China, with the venues were Beijing, Tianjin, Shanghai, Chongqing, Chengdu, Xi'an, Dalian, Qingdao, Xiamen and Suzhou. Beijing, Chongqing and Chengdu, which hosted the 2004 AFC Asian Cup, were chosen for the tournament, though often with different stadiums (Workers' Stadium in Beijing, which was the main stadium in 2004 tournament, later torn down in 2020 and replaced with a new one for the 2023 tournament), while Tianjin, Shanghai, Xi'an, Dalian, Qingdao, Xiamen and Suzhou were the new venues. Of these ten stadiums for the tournament, all but one (TEDA Stadium in Tianjin, which was the only stadium to be renovated) were the newly stadiums which were built for the tournament.

However, on 14 May 2022, AFC announced that China would not be able to host the tournament due to the exceptional circumstances caused by the COVID-19 pandemic.

The following were the host cities and stadiums selected originally for the tournament before China's withdrawal:

Beijing	Tianjin	Shanghai	Chongqing
Workers' Stadium	TEDA Soccer Stadium	Pudong Football Stadium	Longxing Football Stadium
Capacity: 65,094	Capacity: 36,390	Capacity: 37,000	Capacity: 60,000
Chengdu	2023 AFC Asian Cup bids is located in China		Xi'an
Phoenix Hill Football Stadium	2023 AFC Asian Cup bids is located in China		Xi'an International Football Center
Capacity: 57,087	2023 AFC Asian Cup bids is located in China		Capacity: 59,000
Dalian	Qingdao	Xiamen	Suzhou
Dalian Suoyuwan Football Stadium	Qingdao Youth Football Stadium	Xiamen Egret Stadium	Kunshan Football Stadium
Capacity: 63,000	Capacity: 52,800	Capacity: 60,592	Capacity: 45,000

== Second bidding process ==
Following China's withdrawal from hosting of the competition due to the country's COVID-19 pandemic, the second round of bidding was announced on 17 October 2022.

=== Confirmed bids ===
==== Qatar ====
- Qatar – On 18 July 2022, it was confirmed by AFC that Qatar submitted its bidding documents to host the AFC Asian Cup in 2023. The country previously hosted the 1988 AFC Asian Cup and 2011 AFC Asian Cup, with Qatar reaching the quarter-finals in the latter edition. Qatar are the current AFC Asian champions, winning the 2019 AFC Asian Cup. Qatar hosted the 2021 FIFA Arab Cup and 2022 FIFA World Cup. They also bid to host the 2027 AFC Asian Cup until that bid was withdrawn following the country being chosen to host in 2023.

The following were the host cities and stadiums selected for Qatar's bid, originally for 2027:

Lusail	Al Khor	Doha		
Lusail Iconic Stadium	Al Bayt Stadium	~~Stadium 974~~ (Note: Following the conclusion of the match between Brazil and South Korea, belonging to the Round of 16 of the 2022 FIFA World Cup, the stadium with 974 containers is now set to be dismantled.)	Al Thumama Stadium	Qatar University Stadium
Capacity: 88,966	Capacity: 68,895	Capacity: 44,089	Capacity: 44,400	Capacity: 22,400
Host cities in Qatar
Al Rayyan				Al Wakrah
Khalifa International Stadium	Education City Stadium	Ahmad bin Ali Stadium (Note: Ahmad bin Ali Stadium is in Al Rayyan but outside the area of the Doha area map.)	Thani bin Jassim Stadium	Al Janoub Stadium
Capacity: 45,857	Capacity: 44,667	Capacity: 45,032	Capacity: 22,250	Capacity: 44,325

==== South Korea ====
- South Korea – On 20 June 2022, South Korea announced its bid to host the 2023 AFC Asian Cup. South Korea only hosted a single edition before, the 1960 AFC Asian Cup, where the country claimed its second Asian Cup title.

The following were the host cities and venues selected for South Korea's bid:

Seoul	Busan	Incheon	
Seoul World Cup Stadium	Busan Asiad Main Stadium	Incheon Munhak Stadium	Incheon Football Stadium
Capacity: 66,704	Capacity: 53,769	Capacity: 51,234	Capacity: 19,298
Suwon	Location of proposed stadiums of the 2023 South Korea's bids.		Goyang
Suwon World Cup Stadium	Location of proposed stadiums of the 2023 South Korea's bids.		Goyang Stadium
Capacity: 43,923	Location of proposed stadiums of the 2023 South Korea's bids.		Capacity: 41,311
Daejeon	Location of proposed stadiums of the 2023 South Korea's bids.		Gwangju
Daejeon World Cup Stadium	Location of proposed stadiums of the 2023 South Korea's bids.		Gwangju World Cup Stadium
Capacity: 40,903	Location of proposed stadiums of the 2023 South Korea's bids.		Capacity: 36,115
Hwaseong	Cheonan		Daegu
Hwaseong Stadium	Cheonan Stadium		DGB Daegu Bank Park
Capacity: 35,270	Capacity: 26,000		Capacity: 12,419

=== Cancelled bids ===
==== Australia ====
- Australia – On 21 June 2022, Australia declared an interest in hosting the Asian Cup. They were also hosting the 2023 FIFA Women's World Cup in the same year. However, on 2 September, Football Australia announced that it would not proceed with submitting a formal bid.

==== Indonesia ====
- Indonesia – On 28 June 2022, Indonesia submitted its bid documents to host the AFC Asian Cup in 2023, confirmed by the president of PSSI, Mochamad Iriawan. Indonesia had hosted only one Asian Cup, the 2007 AFC Asian Cup, alongside Malaysia, Thailand and Vietnam. There were fears about conflicting schedule if Indonesia won the bid, as the country was also hosting the 2023 FIFA U-20 World Cup. However, on 15 October, the AFC decided to withdraw Indonesia from the bidding.

=== Previously interested in bids ===
==== Japan ====
- Japan – Japan initially announced its interests in hosting the competition, but it was not among the countries that submitted the bid to host it.
