= Workers (Gong Ren) =

Workers 工人
- Cover image
- Author: Helen Couchman
- Language: English; Chinese
- Genre: Artist's Book
- Publisher: Soloshow Publishing
- Publication date: June 2008
- Publication place: United Kingdom
- Media type: Print (Hardback)
- Pages: 152 pp (first edition, hardback)
- ISBN: 978-0-9560172-0-8 (first edition, hardback)

Workers (Chinese: 工人; pinyin: gongren) is a book of 143 portraits of migrant workers who participated in the construction of the Olympic Green in Beijing, China in the lead up to the 2008 Summer Olympics. The book is the work of British artist Helen Couchman and consists primarily of photographs of the workers on the building site. The workers were photographed with the iconic buildings of the Beijing Olympics: The Beijing National Stadium (国家体育场), known colloquially as the "Bird's Nest" (鸟巢), and the Beijing National Aquatics Center (国家游泳中心), also known as the "Water Cube" (水立方).

Portrait of Zhang Gao and his signature from the series Workers 工人

== Background ==
At the height of its construction, nearly 17,000 workers were involved in building the "Bird's Nest". Workers 工人 documents the human side of construction with worker portraits, information on the workers themselves, and details on how Couchman carried out the project. In December 2007, Couchman circumvented security on the Olympic construction site and was able to approach the workers about taking their pictures. She later returned to the site with two copies of each photo, giving each of her subjects one copy to keep and asked the workers to write their name and hometown on the other. Couchman felt that the element of exchange was key to this project.

== Reception ==
In the book's introduction, British art critic Peter Suchin writes that the way Couchman positions the workers at roughly the same spot for each portrait suggests they can also be seen as "one single portrait, that of `the worker' engaged in the making of the Place of the Games ... the central focus, the essential signifier of the new Beijing". Photographs from this series were exhibited in London, England and Hong Kong. Discussions of workers' rights have been raised in the context of this book, but it was not Couchman's reason for starting the project.
