= Luoyang Olympic Sports Center Stadium =

Chinese stadium

- 洛阳市奥林匹克中心体育场 (Chinese)
- Location: Yibin District, Luoyang, Henan, China
- Owner: Luoyang Municipal Government
- Capacity: 59,795 (fixed seats: 50,000; mobile seats: 10,000)
- Surface: Grass

Construction
- Groundbreaking: 15 September 2020
- Opened: 30 April 2022
- Cost: ¥4.631 billion (total project)
- Architects: Luoyang Planning and Design Institute
- General contractor: China Construction Eighth Engineering Division

The Luoyang Olympic Sports Center Stadium (Chinese: 洛阳市奥林匹克中心体育场) is a multi-purpose stadium located in Yibin District, Luoyang, Henan Province, China. It serves as the main venue of the Luoyang Olympic Sports Center complex and was built to host the opening and closing ceremonies and athletics events of the 14th Henan Provincial Games in 2022.

== Design and construction ==
The stadium is part of the Luoyang Olympic Sports Center project, which covers approximately 731.5 acres (about 487,000 square meters) with a total investment of 4.631 billion yuan. The complex was designed according to Grade A sports venue standards, capable of hosting national-level comprehensive sports events and international single-sport competitions.

Construction of the project began on 15 September 2020, undertaken by China Construction Eighth Engineering Division as the general contractor. The stadium features a concrete structure with steel roof trusses, with the main steel structure installation completed by the end of August 2021.

The architectural design concept is "Mountains Surrounded by Water, National Beauty Blooms; Silk Road Spreads Sports Spirit", incorporating elements of peonies and the Silk Road to reflect Luoyang's status as the eastern starting point of the ancient Silk Road. The stadium was completed and held its lighting ceremony on 30 April 2022, marking the completion of the first phase of the project.

== Facilities ==
The stadium has a total capacity of 59,795 seats, including 50,000 fixed seats and approximately 10,000 mobile seats, making it approximately 30% larger than the previous Luoyang New District Stadium in terms of seating capacity. The venue features a standard 400-meter circular running track and a standard football pitch, along with various athletics competition facilities.

The stand configuration utilizes a three-tier symmetrical layout to ensure good sightlines from all seats. The western side of the stadium contains functional rooms including VIP reception and lounge areas, four sets of athlete rest and shower rooms, medical facilities, and doping control rooms. Additional facilities include press centers, news media rooms, and post-event control centers.

The stadium employs a pedestrian-vehicle separation traffic system, with an outer ring road for vehicles and an inner ring for pedestrians. The entire Olympic Sports Center complex includes 2,306 motor vehicle parking spaces (including 346 electric vehicles charging spaces) and 5,898 non-motor vehicle parking spaces.

== Events ==
The stadium served as the main venue for the 14th Henan Provincial Games, which opened in September 2022.
