= China National Electric Engineering Company =

Chinese state-owned engineering company

China National Electric Engineering Company (CNEEC)
- Formerly: China National Electric Equipment Corporation
- Company type: Subsidiary
- Founded: 1984
- Headquarters: China
- Parent: China Machinery Engineering Corporation
- Website: cneec.com.cn

China National Electric Engineering Co. Ltd. (Chinese: 中国电力工程公司 | abbr. CNEEC) is a state-owned engineering company. A specialized engineering services contractor; the company focuses in the areas of Engineering, Procurement & Construction (EPC), Consultation, Operation & Maintenance and Rehabilitation in infrastructural and clean energy solutions for various industrial projects. CNEEC is an international engineering company, which has been listed in the top 225 International Contractors by USA's ENR.

China National Electric Engineering Company operates in Pakistan as through its wholly-owned subsidiary CNEEC Pakistan which has been a competitive contractor in Pakistan's energy sector, having completed over 12 construction projects, including power plants and power grids across the country. The company has actively participated towards building the China-Pakistan Economic Corridor (CPEC), a 3,000-km long route linking the Kashgar city of China to a Gwadar Port in Pakistan. Along the way, the two countries are constructing networks of highways, railways and industrial parks, with a combined investment of $62 billion. Under the frame of CPEC, The electric company built the first industrial park, the Rashakhai Special Economic Zone (SEZ), planned to cover an area of 4.04 km^{2}. Not only the transport route but also a package of extended solutions; the economic zone aims to become a home for hi-tech innovation companies and a hub for trade and logistics, further promoting the Pak-China Relations with Economic Stability of the local economy and people.

The electric company has been contracted to build a 233 MW power plant in the Sabal Province of East Malaysia. The $310-million coal-fired power station project in Malaysia was represented to be the first collaboration of a Chinese state-owned company with the Malaysian electric utility company, TNB.

CNEEC was one of the two companies to be sanctioned by World Bank Group for 18 months, in October 2020 for fraudulent practices in Zambia.

In June 2023, CNEEC was sanctioned by Asian Development Bank (ADB) for 24 months, due to fraudulent practices in one of its projects.
