= 2027 AFC Asian Cup bids =

Football tournament host selection process

The bidding process for the 2027 AFC Asian Cup was the process by which the location for the 2027 AFC Asian Cup was chosen as the hosts. Saudi Arabia was selected as the host country.

== Bidding process ==
On 3 December 2019, the Asian Football Confederation (AFC) brought forward the award of hosts for its 2027 Asian Cup, opening up a bid process for the confederation's flagship tournament that began in early 2020 with the hosts expected to be chosen later in 2022.

Increased to a 24-team tournament, the first expanded edition was held in the United Arab Emirates in January 2019 and marked a big step forward for the event, both in terms of media, participation and organisational requirements.

In 2023, Qatar was host, with the 2027 tournament remaining in West Asia with Saudi Arabia being the host.

AFC President Shaikh Salman bin Ebrahim Al Khalifa emphasised that future AFC Asian Cups should be given more preparation time, with the 2027 hosts being appointed as soon as possible.

On 2 April 2020, the confederation decided to extend the deadline for member associations to submit their "Expression of Interest" for hosting the 2027 AFC Asian Cup from 31 March to 30 June.

The decision was taken in light of the current COVID-19 pandemic to allow member associations, many of which were affected by the global outbreak, sufficient time to meet their internal processes and timelines.

At its meeting in Hong Kong in December 2019, the AFC Executive Committee agreed to provide future hosts for the Asian Cup, beginning with the 2027 edition, with more preparation time as part of the AFC's continued commitment towards upgrading its competitions and enhancing Asia's premier football tournament.

On 1 July 2020, AFC confirmed that initially five member associations expressed their interest to host 2027 Asian Cup. Four remained by 16 December after Uzbekistan's withdrawal.

In July 2021, the AFC Executive Committee announced that the host of the 2027 AFC Asian Cup would be chosen in 2022 instead of the upcoming 31st AFC Congress on 27 November. The reasons cited for the postponement were "prevailing challenges" caused by the COVID-19 pandemic.

On 17 October 2022, the AFC Executive Committee announced that the host of the 2027 AFC Asian Cup would be chosen by the AFC Congress at its next meeting on 1 February 2023 in Manama, Bahrain. At the Congress, Saudi Arabia was confirmed to be the host.

== Confirmed bid ==
=== Saudi Arabia ===
Saudi Arabia made known its intent to host the competition on 6 February 2020.

The slogan "Forward for Asia" was revealed as the official logo of the 2027 Asian Cup later in September, before Saudi Arabia won the bid.

The following are the host cities and stadiums selected for Saudi Arabia's bid:

==== Main list ====
Riyadh
King Fahd International Stadium	Prince Faisal bin Fahd Stadium	King Saud University Stadium	Qiddiya Sports Stadium
Capacity: 70,200	Capacity: 44,500	Capacity: 25,000	Capacity: 22,163
Location of the host cities of the 2027 Saudi Arabia's bids (Main list).
Riyadh	Jeddah		Dammam
Riyadh Stadium	King Abdullah Sports City Stadium	Prince Abdullah Al Faisal Stadium	Dammam Stadium
Capacity: 21,082	Capacity: 62,345	Capacity: 27,000	Capacity: 46,096

==== Reserve list ====
Dammam
Prince Mohamed bin Fahd Stadium	Prince Saud bin Jalawi Stadium
Capacity: 26,000	Capacity: 10,000
Location of the host cities of the 2027 Saudi Arabia's bids (Reserve list).

== Cancelled bids ==
=== India ===
On 5 June 2019, the All India Football Federation President, Praful Patel, expressed India's interest to join the bid for the 2027 Asian Cup. On 5 April 2020, India submitted its bid documents for hosting the AFC Asian Cup in 2027, a top official of the national federation confirmed. On 16 December, the AIFF officially announced its candidature to host the AFC Asian Cup in 2027. The slogan "Brighter Future Together" was revealed as the official logo of the 2027 Asian Cup in December. If selected, it would have marked the first time India hosted the tournament. However, with the country suspended by FIFA on 16 August 2022 due to political interference, its bid for 2027 was initially held in limbo. India was reinstated as the potential host of the tournament after the ban was lifted by FIFA on 26 August. Later, on 5 December, the AIFF Executive Committee decided to withdraw its bid to host the AFC Asian Cup.

=== Iran ===
On 29 April 2020, Iran declared interests to host the competition, with Iran hosting it twice in 1968 and 1976. If chosen, it would have been the third time for Iran to host. Unlike the three other bidders, Iran did not reveal a slogan for the competition. Iran officially withdrew their bid on 13 October 2022.

=== Qatar ===
On 28 April 2020, Qatar announced its interests to host the Asian Cup. In October and December, the Qatari association submitted its hosting requirements to the AFC. The country hosted the Asian Cup twice in 1988 and 2011. However, they also bid to host the 2023 AFC Asian Cup and would have been ineligible to host consecutive Asian Cup tournaments. Qatar officially withdrew their 2027 bid following their successful one for 2023.

The slogan "Celebrating Asia" was revealed as the official logo of the 2027 Asian Cup in the 2020 Emir of Qatar Cup final, which was held in Ahmad bin Ali Stadium in the city of Al Rayyan.

=== Uzbekistan ===
On 16 September 2019, Uzbek President Shavkat Mirziyoyev received AFC President Salman bin Ibrahim Al Khalifa in Tashkent. The meeting discussed the interaction between Uzbekistan and the AFC in popularizing football, supporting youth and women's football, and also raised the issue of holding international competitions in Uzbekistan. In addition, in connection with the arrival of Sheikh Salman in Tashkent, the media in Uzbekistan reported that Uzbekistan was initially one of the main contenders for the hosting of the Asian Cup in 2027. On 16 December 2020, the Uzbekistan Football Association notified the AFC that it quit its bid to host the Asian Cup. It would have been the first time for Uzbekistan to host the competition.

== Previous expressions of interest ==
=== Iraq and Jordan ===
The two nations expressed interests in bidding together for the competition in December 2019, and there were plans to materialise this. However, the countries' member associations were not among those that expressed their interest by the 30 June 2020 deadline.
