= 2023 in Chinese music =

List of years in Chinese music
- … 2013; 2014; 2015; 2016; 2017; 2018; 2019; 2020; 2021; 2022; 2023; 2024; 2025; 2026; 2027; 2028; 2029; 2030; 2031; 2032; 2033 …
- Art; Archaeology; Architecture; Literature; Music; Philosophy; Science; +...

The following is an overview of 2023 in Chinese music. Music in the Chinese language (Mandarin and Cantonese) and artists from Chinese-speaking countries (Mainland China, Hong Kong, Taiwan, Malaysia, and Singapore) will be included. The following includes TV shows that involve Chinese music, award ceremonies, releases, and deaths that have occurred.

== TV shows ==
- Ring A Bell (June 8 - August 12) (zh)

== Award shows ==
Date	Event	Host	Venue	Location	Ref.
April 27	Midi Music Awards	—	Yantai International Expo Center	Yantai, Shandong	
May 6	Top Ten Chinese Gold Songs Award	RTHK	Hong Kong Coliseum	Hung Hom Bay, Kowloon	
June 3	Hito Music Awards	Hit FM	Taipei Arena	Songshan, Taipei	
June 30	Chinese Music Awards	International Chinese Music Union	—	Hunan, Changsha	
July 1	Golden Melody Awards	—	Taipai, Taiwan	Taipei Arena	
July 8	TMEA (zh)	Tencent Music Entertainment Group	Galaxy Arena (zh)	Cotai, Macau	
July 9	TMEA (zh)	Tencent Music Entertainment Group	Galaxy Arena (zh)	Cotai, Macau	
July 23	China Music Awards	Channel V	Cotai Arena	Cotai, Macau	
August 28	Chinese Top Ten Music Awards	Shanghai Media Group	Mercedes-Benz Arena	Pudong, Shanghai	

== Releases ==
=== November ===
Date	Album	Artist(s)	Genre(s)	Ref.
1	On My Youth	WayV	Hip hop; R&B; Trap	

== Deaths ==
- July 5 — Coco Lee, 48, Hong Kong-American singer-songwriter

== See also ==
- 2023 in China
  - Music of China
- 2023 in Hong Kong
  - Music of Hong Kong
- 2023 in music
- 2023 in Taiwan
  - Music of Taiwan
    - List of bands from Taiwan
    - List of Taiwanese heavy metal musical groups
- Chinese Music Society of North America
- List of C-pop artists
- List of Chinese musicians
- Music of Macau
