= 2024 in Chinese music =

List of years in Chinese music
- … 2014; 2015; 2016; 2017; 2018; 2019; 2020; 2021; 2022; 2023; 2024; 2025; 2026; 2027; 2028; 2029; 2030; 2031; 2032; 2033; 2034 …
- Art; Archaeology; Architecture; Literature; Music; Philosophy; Science; +...

The following is an overview of 2024 in Chinese music. Music in the Chinese language (Mandarin and Cantonese) and artists from Chinese-speaking countries (Mainland China, Hong Kong, Taiwan, Malaysia, and Singapore) will be included. The following includes TV shows that involve Chinese music, award ceremonies, and releases that have occurred.

== Debuting ==
=== Groups ===
- R.E.D

== Releases ==
=== July ===
Date	Album	Artist	Ref.
11	Oriental – R.E.D	R.E.D	

== See also ==
- 2024 in China
  - Music of China
- 2024 in Hong Kong
  - Music of Hong Kong
- 2024 in music
- 2024 in Taiwan
  - Music of Taiwan
    - List of bands from Taiwan
    - List of Taiwanese heavy metal musical groups
- List of C-pop artists
- List of Chinese musicians
- Music of Macau
