= 2015 in Chinese music =

The following is an overview of 2015 in Chinese music. Music in the Chinese language (mainly Mandarin and Cantonese) and artists from Chinese-speaking countries (mainland China, Hong Kong, Taiwan, Malaysia, and Singapore) will be included. The following includes TV shows that involve Chinese music, award ceremonies, debuting artists, and releases that have occurred.

== TV shows ==
- I Am a Singer (Season 3) (January 2 – April 3)
- Sing My Song (season 2) (January 2 – March 13)
- The Voice of China (season 4) (July 17 – October 7)

== Award shows ==
2015 music award ceremonies in China, Hong Kong, and Taiwan
Date	Event	Host	Venue	Ref.
March 25	QQ Music Awards	Tencent Music Entertainment Group	Shenzhen Bay Sports Center	
April 11	The 3rd V Chart Awards	YinYueTai	Cadillac Arena	
April 13	Top Chinese Music Awards	Beijing Enlight Media	Shenzhen Bay Sports Center	
August 23	(2014) Music Radio China Top Chart Awards	China National Radio	Cadillac Arena	
December 5	Migu Music Awards	China Mobile	University of Electronic Science and Technology of China Gymnasium	
December 5	Music Pioneer Awards	Music FM Radio Guangdong and other 23 provincial music stations across the country	Guangzhou International Sports Arena	
December 12	Midi Music Awards	Beijing Midi School of Music	Candy Live Three Level	

- 2015 China Music Awards
- 2015 Chinese Music Awards
- 2015 Chinese Music Media Awards
- 2015 ERC Chinese Top Ten Awards (zh)
- 2015 Global Chinese Golden Chart Awards
- 2015 Global Chinese Music Awards
- 2015 Ku Music Asian Music Awards
- 2015 MTV Europe Music Awards Best Chinese & Hong Kong Act: Jane Zhang
- 2015 MTV Europe Music Awards Best Asian Act: Jane Zhang

== Debuting ==
=== Groups ===
- S.I.N.G

=== Solo debuts ===
- Lu Han

== Releases ==
=== First quarter ===
==== January ====
Date	Album	Artist(s)	Genre(s)	Ref.
15	青春的约定	SNH48	Pop	
31	SNH48年度金曲大赏演唱会	SNH48	Pop	

==== February ====
Date	Album	Artist(s)	Genre(s)	Ref.
17	iTunes Session	Li Ronghao	Pop	

==== March ====
Date	Album	Artist(s)	Genre(s)	Ref.
28	雨季之后	SNH48	Pop	

=== Second quarter ===
==== May ====
Date	Album	Artist(s)	Genre(s)	Ref.
15	盛夏好声音	SNH48	Pop	

==== September ====
Date	Album	Artist(s)	Genre(s)	Ref.
14	Reloaded I	Lu Han	Pop; Trap; Future bass	

=== Fourth quarter ===
==== October ====
Date	Album	Artist(s)	Genre(s)	Ref.
15	万圣节之夜	SNH48	Pop	

==== December ====
Date	Album	Artist(s)	Genre(s)	Ref.
1	Reloaded II	Lu Han	Pop; Trap; Jersey club	
22	Reloaded	Lu Han	TBA	
29	新年的钟声	SNH48	Pop	

== See also ==
- 2015 in China
  - Music of China
- 2015 in Hong Kong
  - Music of Hong Kong
- 2015 in music
- 2015 in Taiwan
  - Music of Taiwan
- ABU TV Song Festival 2015
- List of C-pop artists
- List of Chinese musicians
- Music of Macau
