= 2014 in Chinese music =

The following is an overview of 2014 in Chinese music. Music in the Chinese language (Mandarin and Cantonese) and artists from Chinese-speaking countries (Mainland China, Hong Kong, Taiwan, Malaysia, and Singapore) will be included.

== TV shows ==
- I Am a Singer (season 2) (January 3 – April 11)
- Sing My Song (season 1) (January 3 – March 21)
- The Voice of China (season 3) (July 18 – October 7)

== Award shows ==
| Date | Event | Host | Venue | Ref. |
|---|---|---|---|---|
| January 11 | (2013) Chinese Music Awards | International Chinese Music Union and China National Radio | Haixinsha Asian Games Park | |
| March 27 | QQ Music Awards | Tencent Music Entertainment Group | Shenzhen Bay Sports Center | |
| March 31 | Chinese Top Ten Music Awards | Shanghai Media Group | Mercedes-Benz Arena | |
| April 5 | Global Chinese Golden Chart Awards | China National Radio | Putra Stadium | |
| April 13 | 2014 Top Chinese Music Awards | Beijing Enlight Media | Shenzhen Bay Sports Center | |
| April 15 | The 2nd V Chart Awards | YinYueTai | Cadillac Arena | |
| April 23 | China Music Awards | Channel V | Cotai Arena | |
| April 26 | (2013) Music Radio China Top Chart Awards | China National Radio | MasterCard Center | |
| December 13 | Migu Music Awards | China Mobile | Shenzhen Bay Sports Center | |
| December 14 | Music Pioneer Awards | Music FM Radio Guangdong and other 23 provincial music stations across the country | Tianhe Stadium | |
| December 30 | Chinese Music Media Awards | Southern Metropolis Daily and Nanao Program | Tianhe Stadium | |

- 2014 Chinese Music Awards
- 2014 Global Chinese Music Awards
- 2014 Midi Music Awards
- 2014 MTV Europe Music Awards Best Chinese & Hong Kong Act: Bibi Zhou
- 2014 MTV Europe Music Awards Best Asian Act: Bibi Zhou

== Releases ==
=== First quarter ===
==== March ====
| Date | Album | Artist(s) | Genre(s) | Ref. |
|---|---|---|---|---|
| 24 | Composer | Li Ronghao | Pop | |
| 28 | 梅洛斯之路 | SNH48 | Pop | |

=== Second quarter ===
==== April ====
| Date | Album | Artist(s) | Genre(s) | Ref. |
|---|---|---|---|---|
| 18 | 心电感应 | SNH48 | Pop | |

==== May ====
| Date | Album | Artist(s) | Genre(s) | Ref. |
|---|---|---|---|---|
| 16 | 一心向前 | SNH48 | Pop | |

=== Fourth quarter ===
==== October ====
| Date | Album | Artist(s) | Genre(s) | Ref. |
|---|---|---|---|---|
| 12 | 呜吒 | SNH48 | Pop | |

==== November ====
| Date | Album | Artist(s) | Genre(s) | Ref. |
|---|---|---|---|---|
| 28 | Ronghao Li | Li Ronghao | Pop | |

== See also ==
- 2014 in China
- ABU TV Song Festival 2014
- List of C-pop artists
