= 2013 in Chinese music =

The following is an overview of 2013 in Chinese music. Music in the Chinese language (Mandarin and Cantonese) and artists from Chinese-speaking countries (Mainland China, Hong Kong, Taiwan, Malaysia, and Singapore) will be included.

== TV shows ==
- I Am a Singer (season 1) (January 18 – April 12)
- The Voice of China (season 2) (July 12 – October 7)

== Award shows ==
Date	Event	Host	Venue	Ref.
January 25	(2012) Music Pioneer Awards	Music FM Radio Guangdong and other 23 provincial music stations across the country	Guangxi Sports Center	
March 30	Chinese Top Ten Music Awards	Shanghai Media Group	Mercedes-Benz Arena	
April 13	The 1st V Chart Awards	YinYueTai	Cadillac Arena	
April 14	Top Chinese Music Awards	Beijing Enlight Media	Shenzhen Bay Sports Center	
April 18	China Music Awards	Channel V	Cotai Arena	
April 25	(2012) Music Radio China Top Chart Awards	China National Radio	MasterCard Center	
May 17	Global Chinese Golden Chart Awards	China National Radio	The Centre in Vancouver for Performing Arts	
September 26	Chinese Music Media Awards	Southern Metropolis Daily	Huizhou gymnasium	
October 5	Global Chinese Music Awards	988 FM	Putra Indoor Stadium	
November 30	Music Pioneer Awards	Music FM Radio Guangdong and other 23 provincial music stations across the country	Tianhe Stadium	
December 7	Migu Music Awards	China Mobile	New Asia Stadium	

- 2013 MTV Europe Music Awards Best Chinese & Hong Kong Act: Li Yuchun
- 2013 MTV Europe Music Awards Best Asian Act: Li Yuchun

== Debuting ==
=== Solos ===
- Li Ronghao

== Releases ==
=== June ===
Date	Album	Artist(s)	Genre(s)	Ref.
3	XOXO (Hug edition)	EXO	R&B; Hip hop; Electro pop	

=== August ===
Date	Album	Artist(s)	Genre(s)	Ref.
5	Growl (Hug edition)	EXO	R&B; Hip hop; Electro pop	

=== September ===
Date	Album	Artist(s)	Genre(s)	Ref.
16	Model	Li Ronghao	Pop	

=== December ===
Date	Album	Artist(s)	Genre(s)	Ref.
9	Miracles in December (十二月的奇迹)	EXO	R&B; Ballad	

== See also ==
- 2013 in China
- ABU TV Song Festival 2013
- List of C-pop artists
