= 2017 in Chinese music =

The following is an overview of 2017 in Chinese music. Music in the Chinese language (Mandarin and Cantonese) and artists from Chinese-speaking countries (mainland China, Hong Kong, Taiwan, Malaysia, and Singapore) will be included.

== Events ==
- ABU TV Song Festival 2017 (November 1)

== Charts ==
- List of Billboard China V Chart number-one albums of 2017
- List of Billboard China V Chart number-one videos of 2017
- List of Billboard China V Chart top 10 albums of 2017
- List of Global Chinese Pop Chart number-one songs of 2017

== TV shows ==
- Sing! China (season 2) (July 14 – October 8)
- Singer (season 5) (January 21 – April 22)

== Awards ==
Date	Event	Host	Location	Ref.
April 23	China Music Awards	Channel V	Cotai Arena	

- 2017 Chinese Music Awards
- 2017 ERC Chinese Top Ten Awards (zh)
- 2017 CMIC Music Awards
- 2017 Global Chinese Golden Chart Awards
- 2017 Global Chinese Music Awards
- 2017 Midi Music Awards
- 2017 MTV Europe Music Awards Best Greater China Act: Henry Huo
- 2017 Music Radio China Top Chart Awards
- 2017 Top Chinese Music Awards
- The 5th V Chart Awards

== Debuting ==
=== Groups ===
- 7Senses
- CKG48
- SHY48
- YHBOYS

== Releases ==
=== Third quarter ===
==== September ====
Date	Album	Artist(s)	Genre(s)	Ref.
15	前行的力量	SHY48	Pop	

=== Fourth quarter ===
==== October ====
Date	Album	Artist(s)	Genre(s)	Ref.
7	Lay 02 Sheep	Lay	Hip hop	

==== November ====
Date	Album	Artist(s)	Genre(s)	Ref.
17	En	Li Ronghao	Pop	

==== December ====
Date	Album	Artist(s)	Genre(s)	Ref.
22	Winter Special Gift	Lay	Pop	

== See also ==
- 2017 in China
- List of C-pop artists
