= List of awards and nominations received by Bibi Zhou =

Bibi Zhou awards and nominations
Awards and nominations
Award	Wins	Nominations
9+2 Music Pioneer Awards	13	13
Baidu Entertainment Boiling Point	5	5
Beijing Pop Music Awards	2	2
BQ Weekly Awards	2	2
China Fashion Awards	1	1
China Gold Record Awards	1	1
China Music Awards	8	10
China Original Song Awards	2	2
Chinese Music Awards	9	9
ERS Chinese Top Ten Awards	14	14
Fashion Power	1	1
Global Chinese Music Awards	16	16
Global Chinese Golden Chart Awards	1	1
IFPI Hong Kong Top Sales Music Award	1	1
Jeanswest Entertainment Awards	4	4
Nickelodeon Kids' Choice Awards	1	1
Metro Radio Hits Music Awards	7	7
Metro Radio Mandarin Hits Music Awards	16	16
MIGU Music Awards	5	5
MTV Europe Music Awards	2	2
Music King Awards	5	5
MusicRadio China Top Chart Awards	13	19
QQ Music Awards	2	2
Singapore Hits Awards	1	1
Sprite Music Chart Awards	9	9
Star Awards	2	2
Top Chinese Music Awards	11	20
Top Chinese Music Chart Break-Through New Artist Awards	1	1
TVB8 Mandarin Music On Demand Awards	5	8
V Chart Awards	2	2

Totals (Note: Certain award groups do not simply award one winner. They acknowledge several different recipients, have runners-up, and have third place. Since this is a specific recognition and is different from losing an award, runner-up mentions are considered wins in this award tally. For simplification and to avoid errors, each award in this list has been presumed to have had a prior nomination.)
- Wins: 165
- Nominations: 185

Bibi Zhou (simplified Chinese: 周笔畅; traditional Chinese: 周筆暢; pinyin: Zhōu Bǐchàng), also known as Bibi Zhou or Bibi Chow, is a Chinese singer and songwriter. She has won hundreds of awards and accolades from music, fashion, entertainment, image, film, philanthropy.

== 2012 The China Pride·Love China Ceremony ==
2012 The China Pride·Love China Ceremony (Chinese:2012中国娇子·中国爱盛典) is a TV special ceremony, held by Sichuan Provincial Television station SCTV, to honour people in charity, especially during the 2008 Wenchuan earthquake.

Year	Nominee / work	Award	Result	Ref.
2012	Bibi Zhou	Loving Heart Public Figure (Chinese: 爱心公益人物)	Won	

== 9+2 Music Pioneer Awards ==
9+2 Music Pioneer Awards is a music awards show founded by Guangdong radio to honor Guangdong and Hong Kong Cantonese artist. "9+2" refers to the Pan-pearl river delta region.

Year	Nominee / work	Award	Result	Ref.
2006	Notes (Chinese:笔记)	Top 10 Pioneer Songs of the Year (Mainland China) (Chinese: 内地十大先锋金曲)	Won	
2006	Bibi Zhou	Most Popular Pioneer: Female (Mainland China) (Chinese: 内地最受欢迎先锋歌手-女歌手)	Won	
2006	Who Touched My Violin String (Chinese:谁动了我的琴弦)	11 Radio Stations' Choice: Best Album (Chinese: 11家电台联颁最佳专辑)	Won	
2008	Bibi Zhou	Most Popular Pioneer: Female (Mainland China) (Chinese: 内地最受欢迎先锋歌手-女歌手)	Won	
2008	Liuyang River 2008 (Chinese:浏阳河2008)	Top 10 Pioneer Songs of the Year (Mainland China) (Chinese: 内地先十大锋金曲)	Won	
2008	Bibi Zhou	Most Popular Female Pioneer on Internet (Chinese: 网上最具人气先锋歌手)	Won	
2008	Now	11 Radio Stations' Choice: Best Album (Chinese:11家电台联颁最佳专辑)	Won	
2010	Bibi Zhou	Most Popular Pioneer: Female (Mainland China) (Chinese:内地最受欢迎先锋歌手-女歌手)	Won	
2010	Your Love (Chinese:你们的爱)	Top 10 Pioneer Songs of the Year (Mainland China) (Chinese:内地十大先锋金曲)	Won	
2010	Bibi Zhou	Top 5 Music Pioneers: Female (Chinese:最受欢迎先锋歌手五强)	Won	
2010	Kids (Chinese:娃娃)	Best Premiere Song (Chinese:最佳首播歌曲)	Won	
2013	UNLOCK	23 Radio Stations' Choice: Best Album (Chinese:23家电台联颁最佳专辑)	Won	
2013	Close Friend (Chinese:密友)	Top 10 Pioneer Songs of the Year (Mainland China) (Chinese:内地十大先锋金曲)	Won	

== Baidu Entertainment Boiling Point ==
Year	Nominee / work	Award	Result	Ref.
2010	Bibi Zhou	Baidu Tieba Most Popular Charming Female Singer (Chinese:百度贴吧最具人气魅力女歌手)	Won	
2010	Bibi Zhou	Most Popular Idol (Chinese: 最人气偶像)	Won	
2010	Bibi Zhou	Best Fanbase (Chinese:最佳粉丝团)	Won	
2011	Bibi Zhou	Most Popular Female Singer (Mainland China) (Chinese:最热门内地女歌手)	Won	
2011	One-way Mirror (Chinese:单面镜)	Most Popular Top 10 Hits (Chinese:最热门十大金曲)	Won	

== Beijing Pop Music Awards ==
Year	Nominee / work	Award	Result	Ref.
2012	Bibi Zhou	Media Recommdation Award (Chinese:传媒推荐歌手大奖)	Won	
2012	Lipsyncing (Chinese:对嘴)	Golden Melodies of the Year (Chinese:年度金曲)	Won	

== BQ Weekly Awards ==
BQ Weekly Awards (Chinese:BQ红人榜) was created by Beijing magazine BQ Weekly in 2006, honoring people in multiple fields.

Year	Nominee / work	Award	Result	Ref.
2010	Bibi Zhou	Most Popular Singer (Chinese:年度人气歌手)	Won	
2011	Bibi Zhou	Best Singer of the Year (Chinese:年度最佳歌手)	Won	

== China Fashion Awards ==
China Fashion Awards (Chinese:星尚大典) wsa created by Enjoyoung Media Co., Ltd., owned by SMG (Shanghai Media Group Limited), to honour public figures in fashion events.

Year	Nominee / work	Award	Result	Ref.
2012	Bibi Zhou	Outstanding Music Pioneer (Chinese:杰出音乐先锋人物)	Won	

== China Gold Record Awards ==
Year	Nominee / work	Award	Result	Ref.
2012	Canned Fish (Chinese:鱼罐头)	Music Video Award (Chinese:音乐录影带奖)	Won	

== China Music Awards ==
The China Music Awards (Chinese:全球华语音乐榜中榜颁奖典礼), also known as CMA, is a Chinese music awards show, established by Channel [V] in 1994.

Year	Nominee / work	Award	Result	Ref.
2006	Notes	Most Popular Searched Song of the Year (Chinese:搜索最热门年度歌曲奖)	Won	
2007	Bibi Zhou	Best Newcomer of the Year (Chinese:最佳新人)	Won	
2008	Bibi Zhou	Most Popular Female Singer (Mainland) (Chinese:内地最受欢迎女歌手)	Nominated	
2013	Bibi Zhou	Most Popular Female Singer (Mainland) (Chinese:内地最受欢迎女歌手)	Won	
2014	Bibi Zhou	Most Popular Female Singer (Mainland) (Chinese:内地最受欢迎女歌手)	Won	
2014	Unlock	Annual Heated Album (Chinese:年度劲爆专辑)	Won	
2015	Bibi Zhou	Best Female Singer (Mainland) (Chinese:内地最佳女歌手)	Won	
2015	Bibi Zhou	Most Popular Female Singer (Mainland) (Chinese:内地最受欢迎女歌手)	Nominated	
2016	BiBi Zhou	Best Female Singer (Mainland) (Chinese:内地最佳女歌手)	Won	
2016	BOOM!Bibi Zhou 2015 Concert Tour (Chinese:BOOM!周笔畅2015巡回演唱会)	Best Concert (Chinese:最佳演唱会)	Won	

== China Original Song Awards ==
China Original Song Awards (Chinese:中国原创歌曲奖) were created by CNR (CHINA NATIONAL RADIO) in 2003.

Year	Nominee / work	Award	Result	Ref.
2009	Bibi Zhou	Favorite Female Singer (Mainland China) (Chinese:内地最受欢迎女歌手)	Won	
2009	Bibi Zhou	Best Fashion Award (Chinese: 最佳风尚歌手)	Won	

== Chinese Music Awards ==
The Chinese Music Awards (Chinese: 华语金曲奖) is an accolade founded in 2008 to recognize outstanding achievement in the Chinese music industry.

Year	Nominee / work	Award	Result	Ref.
2010	Bibi Zhou	My Favorite Female Singer (Mainland China) (Chinese:我最喜爱的女歌手(内地))	Won	
2010	Bibi Zhou	Most Popular Singer by National voting (Chinese:全国乐迷票选最具人气歌手)	Won	
2010	Your Love (Chinese:你们的爱)	Top 10 Mandarin Songs (Chinese:十大华语金曲)	Won	
2010	One-way Mirror (Chinese:单面镜)	Outstanding Mandarin Song (Chinese:优秀国语歌曲)	Won	
2011	i, fish, light, mirror (Chinese:i，鱼，光，镜)	Top 10 Mandarin Albums (Chinese:国语十大唱片)	Won	
2011	Bibi Zhou/i, fish, light, mirror (Chinese:i，鱼，光，镜)	Best Mandarin Female Singer (Chinese:年度最佳国语女歌手)	Nominated	
2012	Lipsyncing (Chinese:对嘴)	Outstanding Mandarin Song (Chinese:优秀国语歌曲)	Won	
2012	Black Apple (Chinese:黑·择·明)	My Favorite Album (Chinese:我最喜爱的专辑)	Won	
2012	Bibi Zhou	My Favorite Female Singer (Mainland China) (Chinese:我最喜爱的女歌手（内地）)	Won	
2012	Bibi Zhou	Most Popular National Singer (Chinese:全国最受欢迎歌手)	Won	

== Cosmopolitan Beauty Awards ==
Year	Nominee / work	Award	Result	Ref.
2014	Bibi Zhou	Forever Young Icon	Won	

== ERS Chinese Top Ten Awards ==
ERS Chinese Top Ten Awards (Chinese:东方风云榜颁奖典礼) is a music awards show, mostly known for honoring Mandopop music and Mandrin singers based on the radio chart. It was created by Shanghai Media Group Limited in 1993.

Year	Nominee / work	Award	Result	Ref.
2006	Bibi Zhou	Most Popular Singer (Chinese:风云人气奖)	Won	
2006	Notes (Chinese:笔记)	Top 10 Hits (Chinese:十大金曲)	Won	
2007	Phone Numbers (Chiese:号码)	Top 10 Hits (Chinese:十大金曲)	Won	
2007	Bibi Zhou	Outstanding Performance of the Year (Chinese:年度杰出表现奖)	Won	
2008	Bibi Zhou	Best Female Singer (Chinese:最佳女歌手)	Won	
2008	Liuyang River 2008 (Chinese:浏阳河2008)	Top 10 Hits (Chinese:十大金曲)	Won	
2012	Black Apple (Chinese:黑·择·明)	Best Album (Chinese:最佳专辑)	Won	
2012	Bibi Zhou	Mainland Most Popular Singer (Chinese:华语5强-内地最受欢迎歌手)	Won	
2013	Notes (Chinese:笔记)	Best Songs in 20 years (Chinese:20年至尊金曲)	Won	
2014	Bibi Zhou	Best Female Singer (Chinese:最佳女歌手)	Won	
2014	Bibi Zhou	Asia Popular Singer (Chinese:亚洲人气歌手)	Won	
2015	Bibi Zhou	Best Female Singer (Chinese:最佳女歌手)	Won	
2016	BiBi Zhou	Best Female Singer (Chinese:最佳女歌手)	Won	
2016	Best Album (Chinese:周笔畅)	Eye rolling (Chinese:翻白眼)	Won	

== Fashion Power ==
Year	Nominee / work	Award	Result	Ref.
2016	Bibi Zhou	Best Attitude Musician (Chinese:年度最具态度音乐人)	Won	

== Global Chinese Music Awards ==
Year	Nominee / work	Award	Result	Ref.
2006	Bibi Zhou	Most Popular New Female Act (Chinese:最受欢迎女新人)	Won	
2006	Bibi Zhou	Allround Act (Chinese:全能艺人奖)	Won	
2006	Bibi Zhou	Regional Outstanding Singer for Guangdong (Chinese:广东地区杰出歌手)	Won	
2007	Bibi Zhou	Top 5 Most Popular Female Singers (Chinese: 最受欢迎女歌手5强)	Won	
2007	Bibi Zhou	Allround Artist (Chinese:全能艺人奖)	Won	
2007	Bibi Zhou	Regional Outstanding Singer for Guangdong (Chinese:广东地区杰出歌手)	Won	
2007	The Future is Now (Chinese:未来就是现在)	Favorite 20 Hits (Chinese:二十大最受欢迎金曲)	Won	
2008	Bibi Zhou	Top 5 Most Popular Female Singers (Chinese: 最受欢迎女歌手5强)	Won	
2009	Bibi Zhou	Regional Outstanding Singer for Guangdong (Chinese:广东地区杰出歌手)	Won	
2009	Bibi Zhou	7 Radio Stations Media Recommdation Award (Chinese:七台联颁传媒推荐歌手奖)	Won	
2009	Your Love (Chinese:你们的爱)	Favorite 20 Hits (Chinese:二十大最受欢迎金曲)	Won	
2010	Canned Fish (Chinese:鱼罐头)	Favorite 20 Hits (Chinese:二十大最受欢迎金曲)	Won	
2013	Unlock	Best Album (Chinese:最佳专辑)	Won	
2013	Bibi Zhou	Top 5 Most Popular Female Singers (Chinese: 最受欢迎女歌手5强)	Won	
2013	Bibi Zhou	Regional Outstanding Singer for Guangdong (Chinese:广东地区杰出歌手)	Won	
2013	Ribs (Chinese:肋骨)	Favorite 20 Hits (Chinese:二十大最受欢迎金曲)	Won	

== Global Chinese Golden Chart Awards ==
Year	Nominee / work	Award	Result	Ref.
2011	Bibi Zhou	CityFM Recommendation Award (Chinese:CITYFM推崇大奖)	Won	

== IFPI Hong Kong Top Sales Music Award ==
Year	Nominee / work	Award	Result	Ref.
2011	i, fish, light, mirror (Chinese:i，鱼，光，镜)	IFPI Top 10 Selling Mandrin Album (IFPI十大最高销量国语唱片)	Won	

== Entertainment Awards ==
Year	Nominee / work	Award	Result	Ref.
2008	Liuyang River 2008 (Chinese:浏阳河2008)	Hit of the Year (Chinese:年度金曲)	Won	
2010	Bibi Zhou	Most Popular Entertainers of the Year (Chinese:最具人气娱乐人物)	Won	
2010	Your Love (Chinese:你们的爱)	Hit of the Year (Chinese:年度至尊金曲)	Won	
2011	i, fish, light, mirror (Chinese:i，鱼，光，镜)	Most Influential Music Album (Chinese:年度最具影响力音乐专辑)	Won	

== Nickelodeon Kids' Choice Awards ==
Year	Nominee / work	Award	Result	Ref.
2015	Bibi Zhou	Favorite Chinese Act	Won	

== Metro Radio Hits Music Awards ==
Year	Nominee / work	Award	Result	Ref.
2005	Bibi Zhou	National Popular Singer (Chinese:全国劲爆人气歌手大奖)	Won	
2009	Bibi Zhou	Metro Best Singer (Online Voted) (Chinese:新城全国乐迷投选劲爆歌手)	Won	
2009	Bibi Zhou	Metro Best Mandarin Singer (Chinese:新城劲爆国语歌手)	Won	
2009	Kids (Chinese:娃娃)	Metro Best Song (Chinese:新城劲爆歌曲)	Won	
2010	Bibi Zhou	Metro Best Singer (Online Voted) (Chinese:新城全国乐迷投选劲爆歌手)	Won	
2010	Bibi Zhou	Metro Best Mandarin Singer (Chinese:新城劲爆国语歌手)	Won	
2010	Canned Fish (Chinese:鱼罐头)	Metro Best Mandarin Song (Chinese:新城劲爆国语歌曲)	Won	

== Metro Radio Mandarin Hits Music Awards ==
Year	Nominee / work	Award	Result	Ref.
2006	Bibi Zhou	Mandarin Force Female Singer (Chinese:新城国语力女歌手)	Won	
2006	Bibi Zhou	National Favorite Female Singer (Chinese:全国最受欢迎女歌手)	Won	
2006	Notes (Chinese:笔记)	Mandarin Force Most Popular Karaoke Songs (Chinese:新城国语力热爆K歌奖)	Won	
2009	Bibi Zhou	Mandarin Force Female Singer (Chinese:新城国语力女歌手)	Won	
2009	Bibi Zhou	National Most Popular Singer (Guangzhou) (Chinese:国语力全国最受欢迎歌手-广州)	Won	
2009	Your Love (Chinese:你们的爱)	Metro Radio Mandarin New Force Songs (Chinese:新城国语力新势力歌曲)	Won	
2010	Bibi Zhou	Mandarin Force Female Singer (Chinese:新城国语力女歌手)	Won	
2010	Bibi Zhou	Mandarin Force National Most Popular Singer (Chinese:国语力全国最受欢迎歌手)	Won	
2010	Canned Fish (Chinese:鱼罐头)	Mandarin Force Best Mandarin Song (Chinese:新城国语力歌曲)	Won	
2011	Bibi Zhou	National Most Popular Stage Performance Award (Chinese:全国最受欢迎舞台大奖)	Won	
2013	Bibi Zhou	National Favorite Singer (Chinese:全国最受欢迎歌手)	Won	
2013	Unlock	Mandarin Force Album (Chinese:新城国语力专辑)	Won	
2013	Running Away	Mandarin Force Song (Chinese:新城国语力歌曲)	Won	
2014	Bibi Zhou	Mandarin Force Singer of the Year (Chinese:新城国语力年度歌手)	Won	
2014	Bibi Zhou	National Favorite Singer (Chinese:全国最受欢迎歌手)	Won	
2014	Don't Forget (Chinese:别忘了)	Mandarin Force Song (Chinese:新城国语力歌曲)	Won	

== MIGU Music Awards ==
The MIGU Music Awards (Chinese: 无线音乐盛典咪咕汇) is a music awards show, founded by China Mobile, owned and running the MIGU and Shanghai Media Group Limited to recognise the most popular music and artists based on the MIGU music store's statistics.

Year	Nominee / work	Award	Result	Ref.
2007	Phone Numbers (Chinese:号码)	Best Selling Original Song from a Movie or Television (Chinese:年度最畅销影视金曲)	Won	
2007	Bibi Zhou	Special Contributions Award (Chinese:年度特别贡献奖)	Won	
2007	Bibi Zhou	Best Selling Female Artist of the Year (Mainland China) (Chinese:年度最畅销内地女歌手)	Won	
2013	Bibi Zhou	Most Influential Female Singer (Chinese: 最具影响力女歌手)	Won	
2013	Ribs (Chinese:肋骨)	Best Selling Personality Song (Chinese:最畅销个性张扬金曲)	Won	

== MTV Europe Music Awards ==
Year	Nominee / work	Award	Result	Ref.
2014	Bibi Zhou	Best Worldwide Act	Won	
2014	Bibi Zhou	Best Chinese & Hong Kong Act	Won	

== Music King Awards ==
Year	Nominee / work	Award	Result	Ref.
2009	Bibi Zhou	Mainland Most Popular Female Singer (Chinese: 内地最受欢迎女歌手)	Won	
2009	Your Love (Chinese:你们的爱)	Top 10 Hits: Mandarin (Chinese:十大金曲-国语)	Won	
2011	Bibi Zhou	Mainland Most Popular Female Singer (Chinese: 内地最受欢迎女歌手)	Won	
2011	Bibi Zhou	Music King Media Award (Chinese:劲歌王传媒大奖)	Won	
2011	Time Machine and Tramp (Chinese:时光机与流浪者)	Top 10 Hits: Mandarin (Chinese:十大金曲-国语)	Won	

== MusicRadio China Top Chart Awards ==
MusicRadio China Top Chart Awards (Chinese:MusicRadio中国TOP排行榜颁奖典礼) is an annual Chinese Pop Music awards ceremony, created by CHINA NATIONAL RADIO in 2003.

Year	Nominee / work	Award	Result	Ref.
2007	Don't love me like a friend (Chinese:别爱我像爱个朋友)	Annual Golden Melodies (Chinese:年度金曲)	Won	
2008	WOW	Best Female Artist (Mainland China) (Chinese:内地最佳女歌手)	Won	
2008	WOW	Annual Golden Melodies (Chinese:年度金曲)	Won	
2008	Bibi Zhou	Favorite Female Artist (Mainland China) (Chinese:内地最受欢迎女歌手)	Nominated	
2008	WOW	Best Album of the Year (Mainland China) (Chinese:内地年度最佳唱片)	Nominated	
2010	Bibi Zhou	Favorite Female Artist (Mainland China) (Chinese:内地最受欢迎女歌手)	Won	
2010	Bibi Zhou	Allround Artist (Mainland China) (Chinese:内地全能艺人)	Won	
2010	Your Love (Chinese:你们的爱)	Annual Golden Melodies (Chinese:年度金曲)	Won	
2011	i, fish, light, mirror (Chinese:i，鱼，光，镜)	Best Album of the Year (Mainland China) (Chinese:内地年度最佳唱片)	Won	
2011	Bibi Zhou	Favorite Female Artist (Mainland China) (Chinese:内地最受欢迎女歌手)	Won	
2011	Canned Fish (Chinese:鱼罐头)	Annual Golden Melodies (Chinese:年度金曲)	Won	
2011	Bibi Zhou	Best Female Artist (Mainland China) (Chinese:内地最佳女歌手)	Nominated	
2012	Bibi Zhou	Favorite Female Artist (Mainland China) (Chinese:内地最受欢迎女歌手)	Nominated	
2012	Black Apple (Chinese:黑·择·明)	Favorite Album (Mainland China) (Chinese:年度最受欢迎唱片-内地)	Nominated	
2012	Black Apple (Chinese:黑苹果)	Annual Golden Melodies (Chinese:年度金曲)	Won	
2014	Running Away	Annual Golden Melodies (Chinese:年度金曲)	Won	
2014	Bibi Zhou	Favorite Female Artist (Mainland China) (Chinese:内地最受欢迎女歌手)	Nominated	
2016	Bibi Zhou	Mainland Best Female (Chinese:内地最佳女歌手)	Won	
2016	Eye rolling (Chinese:翻白眼)	Mainland Best Album (Chinese:内地最佳专辑)	Won	

== QQ Music Awards ==
Year	Nominee / work	Award	Result	Ref.
2016	Bibi Zhou	Best Female Artist (Mainland China) (Chinese:年度内地最佳女歌手)	Won	
2016	Eye-rolling (Chinese:翻白眼)	Best Creative Album (Chinese:年度最佳创意专辑)	Won	

== Singapore Hits Awards ==
Year	Nominee / work	Award	Result	Ref.
2009	Bibi Zhou	Overseas Outstanding Artist Award (Mainland China) (Chinese:海外杰出歌手奖(中国内地))	Won	

== Sino.com Internet Awards ==
Year	Nominee / work	Award	Result	Ref.
2008	Bibi Zhou	Sino Music Most Popular Artist (Chinese:新浪乐库最具人气歌手)	Won	
2011	i, fish, light, mirror (Chinese:i，鱼，光，镜)	Album of the Year (Chinese: 年度专辑)	Won	

== Sprite Music Chart Awards ==
Year	Nominee / work	Award	Result	Ref.
2010	This words (Chinese:这句话)	Golden songs (Mainland China) (Chinese:内地金曲)	Won	
2010	Bibi Zhou	Favorite Female Singer (Mainland China) (Chinese:内地最受欢迎女歌手)	Won	
2010	Bibi Zhou	Favorite National Pop Idol (Chinese:全国我最喜爱人气偶像)	Won	
2011	i, fish, light, mirror (Chinese:i，鱼，光，镜)	Best Album (Mainland) (Chinese:内地最优秀专辑)	Won	
2011	One-way Mirror (Chinese:单面镜)	Golden songs (Mainland China) (Chinese:内地金曲)	Won	
2011	Bibi Zhou	Best Female Singer (Mainland China) (Chinese:内地最佳女歌手)	Won	
2012	Bibi Zhou	Favorite Female Singer (Mainland China) (Chinese:内地最受欢迎女歌手)	Won	
2012	Black Apple (Chinese:黑·择·明)	Best Album (Mainland China) (Chinese:内地最优秀专辑)	Won	
2012	Lipsyncing (Chinese:对嘴)	Golden songs (Mainland China) (Chinese:内地金曲)	Won	

== Star Awards ==
Star Awards (Chinese:星光大典) is a ceremony held by Tencent Co. to honour people in movie, television, music.

Year	Nominee / work	Award	Result	Ref.
2008	First Anniversary (Chinese:一周年)	Top 10 Hits (Chinese:十大金曲)	Won	
2010	This Words (Chinese:这句话)	Top 10 Hits (Chinese:十大金曲)	Won	

== Top Chinese Music Awards ==
The Top Chinese Music Awards (Chinese:音乐风云榜年度盛典) is an awards ceremony held annually by Enlight Media since 2001, to honour people in Chinese music.

Year	Nominee / work	Award	Result	Ref.
2006	Bibi Zhou	Favorite Female Artist (Mainland China) (Chinese:内地最受欢迎女歌手)	Won	
2007	Bibi Zhou/Who Touched My Violin String (Chinese:谁动了我的琴弦)	Best Female Artist (Mainland China) (Chinese:内地最佳女歌手)	Nominated	
2007	Who Touched My Violin String (Chinese:谁动了我的琴弦)	Best Album (Mainland China) (Chinese:最佳专辑(内地))	Nominated	
2007	Bibi Zhou/Who Touched My Violin String (Chinese:谁动了我的琴弦)	Best New Artist (Mainland China) (Chinese:最佳新人(内地))	Nominated	
2010	Bibi Zhou	New Music Forces Female Singer (Chinese:音乐新势力女歌手)	Won	
2010	Your Love (Chinese:你们的爱)	Top 10 Golden Melodies in 10 Years (Mainland China) (Chinese:十年内地十大金曲)	Won	
2011	Bibi Zhou/i, fish, light, mirror (Chinese:i，鱼，光，镜)	Best Female Artist (Mainland China) (Chinese:内地最佳女歌手)	Won	
2011	i, fish, light, mirror (Chinese:i，鱼，光，镜)	Album of the Year (Mainland China) (Chinese: 年度专辑)	Nominated	
2011	I miss U missing me	Best Song (Mainland China) (Chinese:最佳歌曲奖(内地))	Nominated	
2012	Black Apple (Chinese:黑·择·明)	Best Album (Chinese:最佳专辑)	Won	
2012	Bibi Zhou	Favorite Female Artist (Mainland China) (Chinese:内地最受欢迎女歌手)	Won	
2012	I miss U missing me	Best Song (Mainland China) (Chinese:最佳歌曲奖(内地))	Nominated	
2012	Black Apple (Chinese:黑苹果)	Best Music Video (Chinese:最佳音乐录影带)	Nominated	
2014	Bibi Zhou/Unlock	Best Female Artist (Chinese:最佳女歌手)	Won	
2014	Bibi Zhou	Favorite Female Artist (Mainland China) (Chinese:内地最受欢迎女歌手)	Won	
2014	Unlock	Best Album (Chinese:最佳专辑)	Nominated	
2014	Bibi Zhou/Good Night Words (Chinese:晚安的话)	Best lyrics (Chinese:最佳作词)	Nominated	
2015	Bibi Zhou	Best Pop Female Artist (Chinese:最佳流行演唱女歌手)	Won	
2015	Bibi Zhou	Fashion Style of the Year (Chinese:年度风尚歌手)	Won	
2016	Bibi Zhou/Eye-rolling	Best Female Artist of the Year (Chinese:年度最佳女歌手)	Won	
2016	Bibi Zhou	Favorite Female Artist (Chinese:年度最受欢迎女歌手)	Won	
2016	I choose to like you (Chinese:我选择喜欢你)	Best Web series theme song (Chinese:年度最受欢迎网剧歌曲)	Won	

== Top Chinese Music Chart Break-Through New Artist Awards ==
Year	Nominee / work	Award	Result	Ref.
2011	Bibi Zhou	Best Model for New Artist (Chinese:最佳榜样歌手)	Won	

== TVB8 Mandarin Music On Demand Awards ==
Year	Nominee / work	Award	Result	Ref.
2006	Bibi Zhou	Mainland Most Popular Female Singer (Chinese:内地观众最爱女歌手)	Won	
2006	Only Me Left (Chinese:只剩我一个)	Golden Melody Prize (Chinese:金曲奖)	Won	
2006	Bibi Zhou	Most Popular Female New Singer: Gold Prize (Chinese:最受欢迎女新人-金奖)	Won	
2008	Bibi Zhou/WOW	Mainland Most Popular Female Singer (Chinese:内地观众最爱女歌手)	Nominated	
2008	Bibi Zhou/WOW	Most Popular Female Singer (Chinese:最受欢迎女歌手)	Nominated	
2008	WOW	Golden Melody Prize (Chinese:金曲奖)	Nominated	
2009	Your Love (Chinese:你们的爱)	Golden Melody Prize (Chinese:金曲奖)	Won	
2009	Bibi Zhou	Mainland Most Popular Female Singer (Chinese:内地观众最爱女歌手)	Won	

== V Chart Awards ==
Year	Nominee / work	Award	Result	Ref.
2014	Unlock	Album of the Year (Chinese:年度专辑)	Won	
2014	Bibi Zhou	Best Female Artist (Mainland China) (Chinese:内地观众最爱女歌手)	Won	

== Young Choice Awards ==
Young Choice Awards (Chinese:青春的选择年度盛典) is an awards ceremony to honour people based on people's choice on internet.

Year	Nominee / work	Award	Result	Ref.
2013	Bibi Zhou	Favorite Female Artist (Chinese:最受欢迎女歌手)	Won	
