= 2016 in Chinese music =

The following is an overview of 2016 in Chinese music. It lists events and Chinese music released publicly in mainland China. Music in the Chinese language (Mandarin and Cantonese) and artists from Chinese-speaking countries (Mainland China, Hong Kong, Taiwan, Malaysia, and Singapore) are included.

== Events ==
=== February ===
- 22-Sa Dingding performed at 2016 CCTV Lantern Festival Gala, which caused a huge controversy for exposing her lip syncing by holding her microphone upside down.

== TV shows ==
- I Am a Singer (season 4) (January 15 – April 15)
- Sing! China (season 1) (July 15 – October 7)
- Sing My Song (season 3) (January 29 – April 8)

== Awards ==
- 2016 China Music Awards
- 2016 Chinese Music Awards
- 2016 Chinese Top Ten Music Awards
- 2016 Global Chinese Golden Chart Awards
- 2016 Global Chinese Music Awards
- 2016 Ku Music Asian Music Awards
- 2016 MTV Europe Music Awards Best Chinese & Hong Kong Act: G.E.M.
- 2016 Music Pioneer Awards
- 2016 Music Radio China Top Chart Awards
- 2016 QQ Music Awards
- 2016 Top Chinese Music Awards
- The 4th V Chart Awards

== Releases ==
=== First quarter ===
==== January ====
Date	Album	Artist(s)	Genre(s)	Label	Ref.
7	Dong Nan Mei VuVu Reggae	Matzka	Reggae; hip hop; folk; rock		
13	Ying Xiang Ru Ge (Chinese: 影像如歌）	Sean He (Chinese: 和汇慧)	Pop	Tone Lead	
14	There's Only You Between Me and the World	Zheng Yuan		Peacock Records	
15	Subtropical	Hands Up Band	Jazz	Bei Jing Yashen	
19	Dream Is the Only Place Where I Can Find You	Dan Seling	Electronic; R&B; hip hop		
22	An Ideal	Li Ronghao	Pop	Warner Music Group	
22	Mr. Tree	Jason Hong			
29	Your Boy	TT	Rap	Yo Nation	
30	Undercurrent (Chinese: 暗流）	YAKSA	Metal	Modern Sky	

==== February ====
Date	Album	Artist(s)	Genre(s)	Ref.
2	Yeshanming Yezi	Zhang Yuhui	TBA	
16	Reloaded +	Lu Han	TBA	
26		Li Yundi	Classical	

==== March ====
Date	Album	Artist(s)	Genre(s)	Label	Ref.
9	Wild Heart	Queen Sea Big Shark			
11	REBOR	Zhang Xinyi		Bravo Music	
15	Music Cloud	Wu Tong	Instrumental	Yu Yue Dong Fang	
15	Singing Soul	Wu Tong	Instrumental	Yu Yue Dong Fang	
22	Liangzhu's inheritors	Lin Yihua	Musical		
23	My love	Bai Ruoxi	Indie pop		
30	Ling Cun Ji Mo	Debbie (Chinese: 黄荻钧)	Pop	Ocean Butterflies Music Co. Ltd.	
31	Perfect World	Plastic Chocolate	Rock, metal	Zhu Lu He Feng	

=== Second quarter ===
==== April ====
Date	Album	Artist(s)	Genre(s)	Label	Ref.
April 15	Butterflies Fly in Pairs	A Bu	Jazz	Zhu Lu He Feng	
April 22	Stone Café	Leah Dou	Pop	Grey Waters Ltd	
April 22	T.O.B	T.O.B	Rap	Cao Tai Hui Sheng	

==== May ====
Date	Album	Artist(s)	Genre(s)	Ref.
TBA		Lilith	Visual Kei	

==== October ====
Date	Album	Artist(s)	Genre(s)	Ref.
21	Xperience	Lu Han	Pop; RnB	

==== December ====
Date	Album	Artist(s)	Genre(s)	Ref.
27	Xplore	Lu Han	Pop; RnB; electro	

== Unscheduled albums ==
Artist	Album	Genre	Ref.
Alan Dawa Dolma			
Casino Demon	Purple Haze From the Orient		
Dingdang			
Nerve Resistance	The Masked Man		
Shay			
Sun nan			
Zuoxiao Zuzhou			

== See also ==
- 2016 in China
- ABU Radio Song Festival 2016
- List of Billboard China V Chart number-one videos of 2016
- List of C-pop artists
