= 2018 in Chinese music =

The following is an overview of 2018 in Chinese music. Music in the Chinese language (Mandarin and Cantonese) and artists from Chinese-speaking countries (Mainland China, Hong Kong, Taiwan, Malaysia, and Singapore) will be included.

== Charts ==
- List of Billboard China V Chart number-one videos of 2018
- List of Global Chinese Pop Chart number-one songs of 2018

== TV shows ==
- Idol Producer (season 1) (January 19 – April 6)
- Produce 101 (season 1) (April 21 – June 23)
- Sing! China (season 3) (July 13 – October 7)
- Singer (season 6) (January 12 – April 20)

== Awards ==
- 2018 China Music Awards
- 2018 Chinese Music Awards
- 2018 CMIC Music Awards
- 2018 ERC Chinese Top Ten Awards (zh)
- 2018 Global Chinese Golden Chart Awards
- 2018 Global Chinese Music Awards
- 2018 Midi Music Awards
- 2018 MTV Europe Music Awards Best Chinese & Hong Kong Act: Lou Yixiao
- 2018 Music Pioneer Awards
- 2018 Music Radio China Top Chart Awards

== Debuting ==
=== Groups ===
- AKB48 Team SH
- Boy Story
- NEX7
- Nine Percent
- Rocket Girls 101

== Releases ==
=== First quarter ===
==== January ====
Date	Album	Artist(s)	Genre(s)	Ref.
12/15	三角函数（16人版）/ 三角函数（UNIT版）	GNZ48	Pop	
16	Idol Producer OST	Nine Percent		

==== March ====
Date	Album	Artist(s)	Genre(s)	Ref.
27	未来的乐章	SNH48	Pop	

=== Second quarter ===
==== April ====
Date	Album	Artist(s)	Genre(s)	Ref.
30	心的旅程	SHY48	Pop	

==== May ====
Date	Album	Artist(s)	Genre(s)	Ref.
24	森林法则	SNH48	Pop	

==== June ====
Date	Album	Artist(s)	Genre(s)	Ref.
7	怦然33度	SHY48	Pop	
19/26	美丽世界（16人版）/ 美丽世界（Unit版）	CKG48	Pop	

=== Third quarter ===
==== July ====
Date	Album	Artist(s)	Genre(s)	Ref.
9/10	Fiona.N（UNIT版）/ 三角函数（UNIT版）	GNZ48	Pop	

==== August ====
Date	Album	Artist(s)	Genre(s)	Ref.
2	1	Cai Xukun	Pop	
14	梦想的旗帜（UNIT版）	CKG48	Pop	
18	撞	Rocket Girls 101	Pop	

=== Fourth Quarter ===
==== October ====
Date	Album	Artist(s)	Genre(s)	Ref.
17	Ear	Li Ronghao	Pop	

== See also ==
- 2018 in China
- List of C-pop artists
