= List of awards and nominations received by Li Yuchun =

Chris Lee awards and nominations
Awards and nominations
Award	Wins	Nominations
Abbey Road Music Awards	1	1
Asian Film Awards	0	1
Asia Song Festival	1	1
Baidu Entertainment Boiling Point	3	3
Beijing Pop Music Awards	20	34
BQ Weekly Awards	2	3
China Gold Record Awards	1	1
China Music Awards	10	13
Chinese Music Awards	1	1
Chinese Music Media Awards	1	1
Chinese Film Media Awards	0	1
CSC Music Awards	4	6
Entertainment Awards	4	4
ERS Chinese Top Ten Awards	2	2
Global Chinese Music Awards	12	12
Global Chinese Golden Chart Awards	7	7
Golden π Awards	1	1
Hong Kong Film Awards	0	4
Huading Awards	0	1
Hundred Flowers Awards	0	1
KuGou Music Awards	1	1
KuMusic Asian Music Awards	1	1
Metro Radio Hits Music Awards	3	3
MIGU Music Awards	1	1
Mnet Asian Music Awards	1	1
MTV Asia Awards	1	1
MTV Europe Music Awards	2	2
MTV Style Awards	2	2
Music King Awards	3	3
MusicRadio China Top Chart Awards	20	29
New Force ·Time of China Ceremony	1	1
Original Music Awards of Shenzhen	1	1
QQ Music Awards	4	4
RTHK Top 10 Gold Songs Awards	1	2
Singapore Hit Awards	1	1
Sino.com Internet Awards	2	2
Sohu All Star Ceremony	1	1
Southeast Music Chart Awards	7	7
Sprite Music Chart Awards	10	10
Star Awards	5	5
TOM Online Honor Award	1	1
Top Chinese Music Awards	3	5
V Chart Awards	7	7

Totals (Note: Certain award groups do not simply award one winner. They acknowledge several different recipients, have runners-up, and have third place. Since this is a specific recognition and is different from losing an award, runner-up mentions are considered wins in this award tally. For simplification and to avoid errors, each award in this list has been presumed to have had a prior nomination.)
- Wins: 151
- Nominations: 189

Li Yuchun, also known as Chris Lee, is a Chinese singer and songwriter. She has won hundreds of awards and accolades from music, fashion, entertainment, film, and advertisement.

== Abbey Road Music Awards ==
The Abbey Road Music Awards (Chinese: 阿比鹿音乐奖) were created by the Chinese website Douban in 2011. Lee has been awarded once in 2015.

Year	Nominee / work	Award	Result	Ref.
2010	A Magical Encounter 1987 (Chinese: 1987我不知会遇见你)	Best Single: Pop (Chinese: 最受欢迎流行单曲)	Won	

== Asia Music Gala 2016 ==
The Asia Music Gala awards were presented by China internet company Tencent and MTV in 2016. Lee has won two awards.

Year	Nominee / work	Award	Result	Ref.
2016	Chris Lee	Mainland Best Female (Chinese:内地最佳女歌手)	Won	
2016	Barbaric growth (Chinese:野蛮生长)	Mainland Best Album (Chinese:内地年度最佳唱片大赏)	Won	

== Asian Film Awards ==
The Asian Film Awards are presented annually by the Hong Kong International Film Festival Society to recognize the excellence of the film professionals in the film industries of Asian cinema. Lee has been nominated once for her role in Bodyguards and Assassins.

Year	Nominee / work	Award	Result	Ref.
2010	Bodyguards and Assassins	Best Newcomer (Chinese: 最佳新演员)	Nominated	

== Asia Song Festival ==
Asia Song Festival, a.k.a. A-Song-Fe or ASF, is an annual Asian pop music festival held in South Korea, since 2004. It is hosted by the Korea Foundation for International Culture Exchange (KOFICE) and features artists from Asian countries.

Year	Nominee / work	Award	Result	Ref.
2009	Chris Lee	Best Asian Artist: Mainland China	Won	

== Baidu Entertainment Boiling Point ==
As the biggest Chinese search engine, Baidu honors the most popular people and events based on the company's database.

Year	Nominee / work	Award	Result	Ref.
2008	Chris Lee	Most Influential Singer (Chinese: 年度最具号召力歌手)	Won	
2009	Teenage China (Chinese:少年中国)	Hottest Music Video (Chinese: 最热门音乐录影带)	Won	
2009	Chris Lee	Most Searched Idol (Chinese: 最人气偶像(搜索160,816,303次))	Won	

== Beijing Pop Music Awards ==
Year	Nominee / work	Award	Result	Ref.
2007	Chris Lee	Favorite Female Singer (Mainland) (Chinese: 内地年度最受欢迎女歌手)	Won	
2007	Chris Lee	Favorite Female New Singer (Chinese: 年度最受欢迎女新人)	Won	
2007	Loving	Golden Melodies of the Year (Chinese: 年度金曲)	Won	
2008	Chris Lee	Favorite Female Singer (Mainland) (Chinese: 内地年度最受欢迎女歌手)	Won	
2008	Chris Lee	Best Female Singer (Mainland) (Chinese: 内地年度最佳女歌手)	Nominated	
2008	Chris Lee	Best Stage Performance Female (Chinese: 年度最佳舞台演绎女歌手)	Nominated	
2008	Floated Subway (Chinese: 漂浮地铁)	Golden melodies of the Year (Chinese: 年度金曲)	Won	
2008	Interior Student (Chinese: 差生)	Golden melodies of the Year (Chinese: 年度金曲)	Won	
2009	Chris Lee	Best Female Singer (Mainland) (Chinese:内地年度最佳女歌手)	Nominated	
2009	Chris Lee	Favorite Female Singer (Mainland) (Chinese: 内地年度最受欢迎女歌手)	Nominated	
2009	Chris Lee	Best Stage Performance Female (Chinese: 年度最佳舞台演绎女歌手)	Nominated	
2010	Chris Lee	Best Female Singer (Mainland) (Chinese: 内地年度最佳女歌手)	Nominated	
2010	Chris Lee	Favorite Female Singer (Mainland) (Chinese: 年度最受欢迎女歌手)	Nominated	
2010	Why Me	Golden Melodies of the Year (Chinese: 年度金曲)	Won	
2010	Chris Lee	Best Stage Performance Female (Chinese: 年度最佳舞台演绎女歌手)	Won	
2010	Chris Lee	All-round Artist (Mainland) (Chinese: 内地年度全能艺人)	Won	
2011	Chris Lee	Favorite Female Singer (Mainland) (Chinese: 年度最受欢迎女歌手)	Won	
2011	Chris Lee	Best Stage Performance Female (Chinese: 年度最佳舞台演绎女歌手)	Won	
2011	Chris Lee	Best Female Singer (Mainland) (Chinese: 内地年度最佳女歌手)	Nominated	
2011	See You Next Crossing (Chinese: 下个，路口，见)	Best Composing (Chinese: 年度最佳作曲)	Nominated	
2011	See You Next Crossing (Chinese: 下个，路口，见)	Golden Melodies of the Year (Chinese: 年度金曲)	Won	
2012	Chris Lee	Favorite Female Singer (Mainland) (Chinese: 年度最受欢迎女歌手)	Won	
2012	Chris Lee	Best Stage Performance Female (Chinese: 年度最佳舞台演绎女歌手)	Won	
2012	Chris Lee	All-round Artist (Mainland) (Chinese: 内地年度全能艺人)	Won	
2012	Sorry, Just Miss You Suddenly (Chinese: 对不起只是忽然很想你)	Golden Melodies of the Year (Chinese: 年度金曲)	Won	
2012	Chris Lee/The Dancing Artist (Chinese: 会跳舞的文艺青年)	Best Composing (Chinese: 年度最佳作曲)	Nominated	
2012	Chris Lee	Best Female Singer (Mainland) (Chinese: 内地年度最佳女歌手)	Nominated	
2013	Chris Lee/Old If Not Wild (Chinese: 再不疯狂我们就老了)	Best Lyric (Chinese: 年度最佳作词)	Won	
2013	Old If Not Wild (Chinese: 再不疯狂我们就老了)	Best Album (Chinese: 年度最佳专辑)	Won	
2013	Chris Lee	Best Stage Performance Female (Chinese: 年度最佳舞台演绎女歌手)	Won	
2013	Chris Lee	Favorite Female Singer (Mainland) (Chinese: 年度最受欢迎女歌手)	Won	
2013	Chris Lee/Old If Not Wild (Chinese: 再不疯狂我们就老了)	Best Composing (Chinese: 年度最佳作曲)	Nominated	
2013	Chris Lee	Best Female Singer (Mainland) (Chinese: 内地年度最佳女歌手)	Nominated	
2013	Chris Lee	Best Songwriter (Mainland) (Chinese: 年度最佳创作歌手奖(内地))	Nominated	

== BQ Weekly Awards ==
BQ Weekly Awards (Chinese: BQ红人榜) were created by a Beijing magazine BQ Weekly in 2006, honoring people in multiple fields.

Year	Nominee / work	Award	Result	Ref.
2008	Chris Lee	Female Singer of the Year (Chinese: 年度女歌手)	Won	
2008	Teenage China (Chinese: 少年中国)	Song of the Year (Chinese: 年度金曲)	Won	
2013	Chris Lee	Hottest Musician (Chinese: 年度音乐红人)	Nominated	

== China Gold Record Awards ==
Year	Nominee / work	Award	Result	Ref.
2010	Chris Lee	Best Pop Female (Chinese: 流行类最佳女歌手)	Won	

== China Music Awards ==
The China Music Awards (Chinese: 全球华语音乐榜中榜颁奖典礼), also known as CMA, is a Chinese music awards show, established by Channel [V] in 1994. Lee has won 11 times in music. The CMAs once expanded their categories into TV and movie fields during 2010–2012, and Lee was nominated once for her role in Bodyguards and Assassins.

Year	Nominee / work	Award	Result	Ref.
2010	Chris Lee	Most Popular Female Singer (Mainland) (Chinese: 内地最受欢迎女歌手)	Won	
2010	Chris Lee	Favorite Chendu Act (Chinese: 年度最受欢迎成都艺人)	Won	
2010	Chris Lee	12530 MIGU Music Award (Chinese： 12530无线音乐年度大奖)	Won	
2010	Bodyguards and Assassins	Best Newcomer (Chinese: 最佳新演员)	Nominated	
2011	Chris Lee	Most Popular Female Singer (Mainland) (Chinese: 内地最受欢迎女歌手)	Won	
2012	Chris Lee	Best Female Singer (Mainland) (Chinese: 内地最佳女歌手)	Nominated	
2012	Chris Lee	Most Popular Female Singer (Mainland) (Chinese: 内地最受欢迎女歌手)	Won	
2013	Old If Not Wild (Chinese: 再不疯狂我们就老了)	Best Album (Mainland) (Chinese: 内地年度最佳专辑)	Won	
2013	Chris Lee	Most Popular Female Singer (Mainland) (Chinese: 内地最受欢迎女歌手)	Won	
2013	Cold Blade (Chinese: 刀锋偏冷)	Top Hits (Chinese: 榜中榜金曲)	Won	
2013	Cold Blade (Chinese: 刀锋偏冷)	Best Music Video (Chinese: 最佳音乐录影带)	Nominated	
2014	Chris Lee	Best Female Singer (Mainland) (Chinese: 内地最佳女歌手)	Won	
2014	Chris Lee	Asian Most Influential Chinese Singer (Chinese: 亚洲影响力最佳歌手)	Won	

== Chinese Music Awards ==
The Chinese Music Awards (Chinese: 华语金曲奖) is an accolade founded in 2008 to recognize outstanding achievement in the Chinese music industry.

Year	Nominee / work	Award	Result	Ref.
2014	Old If Not Wild (Chinese: 再不疯狂我们就老了)	Top 10 Mandarin songs (Chinese: 十大华语金曲)	Won	

== Chinese Music Media Awards ==
Year	Nominee / work	Award	Result	Ref.
2006	Chris Lee	Artist of the Year (Chinese: 年度艺人)	Won	

== Chinese Film Media Awards ==
Year	Nominee / work	Award	Result	Ref.
2010	Bodyguards and Assassins	Best Newcomer (Chinese:最佳新演员)	Nominated	

== CSC Music Awards ==
City Super Chart (CSC) Awards (Chinese: 城市至尊音乐盛典) is a music ceremony presented by CityFM, featuring a radio music chart with that same title since 2007.

Year	Nominee / work	Award	Result	Ref.
2013	Chris Lee-Young (Chinese: 似火年华)	Favorite Female Singer (Chinese: 年度听众最爱女歌手)	Won	
2013	Old If Not Wild (Chinese: 再不疯狂我们就老了)	Top 20 Hits (年度二十大金曲)	Won	
2015	A Magical Encounter 1987 (Chinese: 1987我不知会遇见你)	Long Live Single (Chinese: 年度最长寿单曲)	Won	
2015	A Magical Encounter 1987 (Chinese: 1987我不知会遇见你)	Top 20 Hits (年度二十大金曲)	Won	
2015	A Magical Encounter 1987 (Chinese: 1987我不知会遇见你)	Favorite Single (Chinese: 年度听众最爱单曲)	Nominated	
2015	Chris Lee-This Unfeeling World (Chinese: 冷暖)	Favorite Female Singer (Chinese: 年度听众最爱女歌手)	Nominated	

== Entertainment Awards ==
Created by Enlight Media in 2007, the awards ceremony (Chinese: 娱乐大典) was to honor people in movies, television, music, brands and top web figures, etc.

Year	Nominee / work	Award	Result	Ref.
2007	Empress and Her Dream (Chinese: 皇后与梦想)	Album of the Year (Chinese: 年度专辑)	Won	
2007	Chris Lee	Female Singer of the Year (Chinese: 年度女歌手)	Won	
2007	Chris Lee	Decade of Entertainment Breakthrough Award (Chinese: 娱乐十年音乐飞跃人物)	Won	
2012	Chris Lee	Most Influential Female Singer (Chinese: 年度最具影响力女歌手)	Won	

== ERS Chinese Top Ten Awards ==
ERS Chinese Top Ten Awards (Chinese: 东方风云榜颁奖典礼) is a music awards show, mostly known for honoring Mandopop music and Mandarin singers based on the radio chart. It was created by Shanghai Media Group Limited in 1993.

Year	Nominee / work	Award	Result	Ref.
2012	Chris Lee	Best Female Singer (Chinese: 最佳女歌手)	Won	
2012	Chris Lee	All-round Artist (Chinese: 年度全能艺人)	Won	

== Freshasia Music Awards ==
Freshasia Music Awards (Chinese: 亚洲新歌榜年度盛典), now renamed the Weibo Music Awards (Chinese: 微博音乐盛典), is an annual award show hosted by the Chinese social media website Weibo.

Year	Nominee / work	Award	Result	Ref.
2016	Chris Lee	Best Female Artist of the Year (Chinese: 年度最佳女歌手)	Won	

== Global Chinese Music Awards ==
Global Chinese Music Awards (Chinese: 全球华语歌曲排行榜颁奖典礼) is a music awards ceremony that features the Global Chinese Pop Chart radio show, established by seven Asian Mandarin radio stations: HitFm (Taiwan), RTHK (Hong Kong), eastradio (Shanghai), Radio Guangdong, Beijing Music Radio, Y.E.S. 93.3FM (Singapore) and 988 FM (Malaysia) in 2001.

Year	Nominee / work	Award	Result	Ref.
2006	Chris Lee	Media Recommendation Award (Chinese: 传媒推荐奖)	Won	
2006	Chris Lee	Top 5 Most Popular Female Singers (Chinese: 最受欢迎女歌手5强)	Won	
2006	Happy Winter (Chinese: 冬天快乐)	Favorite 20 Hits (Chinese: 二十大最受欢迎金曲)	Won	
2007	Chris Lee	Top 5 Most Popular Female Singers (Chinese: 最受欢迎女歌手5强)	Won	
2007	Chris Lee	Media Recommendation Award (Chinese: 传媒推荐奖)	Won	
2007	Happy Wake Up	Favorite 20 Hits (Chinese: 二十大最受欢迎金曲)	Won	
2009	Why Me	Favorite 20 Hits (Chinese: 二十大最受欢迎金曲)	Won	
2009	Chris Lee	Favorite Female Singer (Chinese: 最受欢迎女歌手)	Won	
2009	Chris Lee	Top 5 Most Popular Female Singers (Chinese: 最受欢迎女歌手5强)	Won	
2009	Chris Lee	Best Stage Performance (Chinese: 年度最佳舞台演绎女歌手)	Won	
2010	Chris Lee	Top 5 Most Popular Female Singers (Chinese: 最受欢迎女歌手5强)	Won	
2010	See You Next Crossing (Chinese: 下个，路口，见)	Favorite 20 Hits (Chinese: 二十大最受欢迎金曲)	Won	

== Global Chinese Golden Chart Awards ==
Global Chinese Golden Chart Awards (Chinese: 全球流行音乐金榜颁奖典礼) are an annual music awards ceremony started by China National Radio, which united several Mandarin radio stations all over the world to support Chinese music and create a new music chart radio program—global Chinese music golden chart.

Year	Nominee / work	Award	Result	Ref.
2010	Sorry, Just Miss You Suddenly (Chinese: 对不起，只是忽然很想你)	Top 20 Hits in Mid Year (Chinese: 年中20大金曲)	Won	
2010	See You Next Crossing (Chinese： 下个，路口，见）	Top 20 Hits of the Year (Chinese: 年中20大金曲)	Won	
2010	Chris Lee	MusicRadio Recommendation Award (Chinese: MusicRadio音乐之声推崇大奖)	Won	
2011	Sorry, Just Miss You Suddenly (Chinese: 对不起，只是忽然很想你)	Favorite 20 Hits (Chinese: 二十大最受欢迎金曲)	Won	
2011	Chris Lee	Top 5 Most Popular Female Singers (Chinese: 最受欢迎女歌手5强)	Won	
2013	Chris Lee	Favorite Female Singer (Chinese: 最受欢迎女歌手)	Won	
2013	Old If Not Wild (Chinese: 再不疯狂我们就老了)	Favorite 20 Hits (Chinese: 二十大最受欢迎金曲)	Won	

== Golden π Awards ==
A voting movie award created by China Mobile for most popular movie, actor, actress, etc. during 2008–2011.

Year	Nominee / work	Award	Result	Ref.
2010	Chris Lee	Favorite Actress (Chinese: 最喜爱女演员)	Won	

== Hong Kong Film Awards ==
The Hong Kong Film Awards, founded in 1982, are a film award in Hong Kong. Award ceremonies are held annually in April. The Awards recognize achievement in all aspects of filmmaking, such as directing, screenwriting, acting and cinematography. Lee has been nominated twice for her playing in Bodyguards and Assassins, and twice for film music in 2010 and 2013.

Year	Nominee / work	Award	Result	Ref.
2010	Li Yuchun (Bodyguards And Assassins)	Best Supporting Actress (Traditional/Chinese: 最佳女配角)	Nominated	
2010	Li Yuchun (Bodyguards And Assassins)	Best Newcomer (Traditional/Chinese: 最佳新演員/最佳新演员)	Nominated	
2010	Stive (Chinese:粉末)	Best Original Film Song (Traditional/Chinese: 最佳原創電影歌曲/最佳原创电影歌曲)	Nominated	
2013	Cold Blade (Chinese: 刀锋偏冷)	Best Original Film Song (Traditional/Chinese: 最佳原創電影歌曲/最佳原创电影歌曲)	Nominated	

== Huading Awards ==
The Huading Awards (Chinese: 华鼎奖) were created by Chinese media corporation Tian Xia Ying Cai Media (Chinese: 天下英才传媒) in 2007.

Year	Nominee / work	Award	Result	Ref.
2010	Bodyguards and Assassins	Best Newcomer (Chinese: 新锐演员)	Nominated	

== Hundred Flowers Awards ==
Year	Nominee / work	Award	Result	Ref.
2010	Bodyguards and Assassins	Best Newcomer (Chinese: 最佳新演员)	Nominated	

== KuGou Music Awards ==
Year	Nominee / work	Award	Result	Ref.
2014	Chris Lee	Most Focused Artist (Mainland) (Chinese: 年度内地最受关注艺人)	Won	

== KuMusic Asian Music Awards ==
Year	Nominee / work	Award	Result	Ref.
2015	A Magical Encounter 1987 (Chinese: 1987我不知会遇见你)	Best Album (Chinese:年度最佳专辑)	Won	

== Metro Radio Hits Music Awards ==
Year	Nominee / work	Award	Result	Ref.
2005	Chris Lee	National Popular Singer (Chinese: 勁爆全國人氣歌手/劲爆全国人气歌手)	Won	
2005	Chris Lee	SMASH Best Singer (Online Voted) (Chinese: 勁爆全国投选劲爆歌手/勁爆全国投选劲爆歌手)	Won	
2005	Chris Lee	SMASH Newcomer (Chinese: 勁爆投選勁爆新人王大獎/劲爆投选劲爆新人王大奖)	Won	

== MIGU Music Awards ==
The MIGU Music Awards (Chinese: 无线音乐盛典咪咕汇) is a music awards show, founded by China Mobile, owned and run by the MIGU and Shanghai Media Group Limited to recognize most popular music and artists based on the MIGU music store's statistics.

Year	Nominee / work	Award	Result	Ref.
2007	Chris Lee	Special Contribution Award (Chinese: 无线音乐年度贡献奖)	Won	
2007	Chris Lee	Most Influential Singer (Chinese: 年度最具影响力歌手)	Won	
2008	Chris Lee (Chinese: 李宇春)	Best Selling Album (Chinese: 最畅销唱作专辑)	Won	
2012	Chris Lee	Favorite Female Singer (Chinese: 年度最受欢迎女歌手)	Won	
2012	Sorry, Just Miss You Suddenly (Chinese: 对不起，只是忽然很想你)	Best Selling Song (Mainland China) (Chinese: 年度最畅销金曲)	Won	

== Mnet Asian Music Awards ==
Year	Nominee / work	Award	Result	Ref.
2012	Chris Lee	Asian Artist Award	Won	

== MTV Asia Awards ==
Year	Nominee / work	Award	Result	Ref.
2008	Chris Lee	Favorite China Act (Chinese: 中国最受欢迎歌手)	Won	

== MTV Europe Music Awards ==
Year	Nominee / work	Award	Result	Ref.
2013	Chris Lee	Best Worldwide Act	Won	
2013	Chris Lee	Best Mainland China & Hong Kong Act	Won	

== MTV Style Awards ==
Year	Nominee / work	Award	Result	Ref.
2005	Chris Lee	Style New Trends (Chinese: 最具风格演艺圈新势力)	Won	
2011	Chris Lee	Style Female (Mainland) (Chinese: 年度最具风格内地女歌手)	Won	

== Music King Awards ==
Year	Nominee / work	Award	Result	Ref.
2007	Raining (Chinese: 下雨)	Top 10 Hits: Mandarin (Chinese: 十大金曲-国语)	Won	
2007	Chris Lee	Mainland Most Popular Female Singer (Chinese: 内地最受欢迎女歌手)	Won	
2007	Empress and Her Dream (Chinese: 皇后与梦想)	Music King Media Award (Chinese: 年度最畅销专辑)	Won	

== MusicRadio China Top Chart Awards ==
MusicRadio China Top Chart Awards (Chinese: MusicRadio中国TOP排行榜颁奖典礼) is an annual Chinese Pop Music awards ceremony, created by China National Radio in 2003.

Year	Nominee / work	Award	Result	Ref.
2007	Chris Lee	Favorite Female Artist (Mainland China) (Chinese: 内地最受欢迎女歌手)	Won	
2007	The Story of Ice and Chrysanthemum (Chinese: 冰菊物语)	Annual Golden Melodies (Chinese: 年度金曲)	Won	
2007	Floated Subway (Chinese: 漂浮地铁)	Annual Golden Melodies (Chinese: 年度金曲)	Won	
2008	Chris Lee	Best Stage Performance Female (Mainland China) (Chinese: 内地年度最佳舞台演绎歌手)	Won	
2008	Chris Lee	Favorite Female Artist (Mainland China) (Chinese: 内地最受欢迎女歌手)	Won	
2009	Teenage China (Chinese: 少年中国)	Annual Golden Melodies (Chinese: 年度金曲)	Won	
2009	Chris Lee	Favorite Female Artist (Mainland China) (Chinese: 内地最受欢迎女歌手)	Won	
2009	Chris Lee	All-round Artist (Mainland China) (Chinese: 内地年度全能艺人)	Won	
2010	See You Next Crossing (Chinese: 下个，路口，见)	Annual Golden Melodies (Chinese: 年度金曲)	Won	
2010	Chris Lee	Best Female Artist (Mainland China) (Chinese: 年度内地最佳女歌手)	Won	
2012	Sorry, Just Miss You Suddenly (Chinese: 对不起，只是忽然很想你)	Annual Golden Melodies (Chinese: 年度金曲)	Won	
2012	Chris Lee	Favorite Female Artist (Mainland China) (Chinese: 内地最受欢迎女歌手)	Won	
2012	Chris Lee	Best Crossover Artist (Chinese: 年度最佳跨界艺人)	Won	
2012	The Dancing Artist (Chinese: 会跳舞的文艺青年)	Favorite Album (Mainland China) (Chinese: 年度最受欢迎唱片(内地))	Nominated	
2013	Chris Lee	Favorite Female Artist (Mainland China) (Chinese: 内地最受欢迎女歌手)	Won	
2013	Chris Lee	All-round Artist (Mainland China) (Chinese: 内地年度全能艺人)	Won	
2013	Chris Lee	Favorite Female Artist (Mainland China) (Chinese: 内地最受欢迎女歌手)	Won	
2013	Chris Lee/Old If Not Wild (Chinese: 再不疯狂我们就老了)	Best Lyricist (Mainland China) (Chinese: 最佳作词)	Won	
2013	Old If Not Wild (Chinese: 再不疯狂我们就老了)	Annual Golden Melodies (Chinese: 年度金曲)	Won	
2013	Chris Lee	Best Female Artist (Mainland China) (Chinese: 年度内地最佳女歌手)	Nominated	
2013	Old If Not Wild (Chinese: 再不疯狂我们就老了)	Media Recommendation Album (Chinese: 年度传媒推荐唱片大奖)	Nominated	
2013	Old If Not Wild (Chinese: 再不疯狂我们就老了)	Favorite Album (Chinese: 年度最受欢迎唱片)	Nominated	
2013	Old If Not Wild (Chinese: 再不疯狂我们就老了)	Best Album (Chinese: 年度最佳唱片)	Nominated	
2014	Chris Lee	Favorite Female Artist (Mainland China) (Chinese: 内地最受欢迎女歌手)	Nominated	
2015	Chris Lee	Favorite Female Artist (Mainland China) (Chinese: 内地最受欢迎女歌手)	Won	
2015	Chris Lee	Best Female Artist (Mainland China) (Chinese: 年度内地最佳女歌手)	Nominated	
2015	A Magical Encounter 1987 (Chinese: 1987我不知会遇见你)	Favorite Album (Mainland China) (Chinese: 年度最受欢迎唱片(内地))	Won	
2015	A Magical Encounter 1987 (Chinese: 1987我不知会遇见你)	Best Album (Chinese: 年度最佳唱片)	Nominated	
2015	A Magical Encounter 1987 (Chinese: 1987我不知会遇见你)	Best Composing (Mainland China) (年度最佳作词-内地)	Nominated	

== New Force ·Time of China Ceremony ==
Held by Chinese Internet company tencent, the ceremony (Chinese: 新势力·2005时代中国盛典) was set up to honor public figures, business brands, internet games, and products (car, mobile phones, computers, cosmetics, etc.).

Year	Nominee / work	Award	Result	Ref.
2005	Chris Lee	China Most Popular Web Celebrity (Chinese: 中国最具网络人气明星)	Won	

== Original Music Awards of Shenzhen ==
Originated from the radio program Peng Cheng Ge Fei Yang on Shenzhen Radio Station FM97.1, the awards (Chinese: 鹏城歌飞扬颁奖典礼) were set up to encourage Shenzhen original music in 2003.

Year	Nominee / work	Award	Result	Ref.
2011	I'm Here (Chinese: 我在这里)	Best 10 Songs	Won	

== QQ Music Awards ==
Year	Nominee / work	Award	Result	Ref.
2015	Chris Lee	Favorite Female Artist (Mainland China) (Chinese: 最受欢迎内地女歌手)	Won	
2016	Asshole, I Miss You (Chinese: 混蛋,我想你)	Best International Single (Chinese: 年度最佳国际单曲)	Won	
2016	Chris Lee	Best Crossover Artist (Chinese: 年度最佳跨界艺人)	Won	
2016	Chris Lee	Most Influential Female Singer (Chinese: 年度最具影响力女歌手)	Won	

== RTHK Top 10 Gold Songs Awards ==
RTHK Top 10 Gold Songs Awards (Chinese: 十大中文金曲頒獎音樂會) is one of the main C-pop music awards in Hong Kong, beginning in 1978. The award is sponsored by RTHK. The ceremony is usually held in January following the end of the previous music season. It usually takes place at the Hong Kong Coliseum, sometimes at the Sha Tin Racecourse.

Year	Nominee / work	Award	Result	Ref.
2009	Chris Lee	National Best Female (Traditional/Chinese: 全國最佳女歌手獎/全国最佳女歌手奖)	Nominated	
2010	Chris Lee	National Best Female (Traditional/Chinese: 全國最佳女歌手獎/全国最佳女歌手奖)	Won	

== Singapore Hit Awards ==
Year	Nominee / work	Award	Result	Ref.
2007	Chris Lee	Favorite China Female Act (Chinese: 中国最受欢迎女歌手)	Won	

== Sino.com Internet Awards ==
Sino.com Internet Awards (Chinese: 新浪网络盛典), held by Chinese, is one of the biggest internet companies, Sino, created in 2003.

Year	Nominee / work	Award	Result	Ref.
2006	Chris Lee	Most Popular New Artist (Chinese: 最具人气新锐偶像)	Won	
2010	Chris Lee	Most Influential Artist (Chinese: 年度最具号召力艺人)	Won	

== Downloading 2005 · Sohu All Star Ceremony ==
A special ceremony (Chinese: 下载2005·搜狐全明星盛典) held by Chinese internet company Sohu in 2006.

Year	Nominee / work	Award	Result	Ref.
2006	Chris Lee	Celebrity of the Year (Chinese: 年度明星)	Won	

== Southeast Music Chart Awards ==
Year	Nominee / work	Award	Result	Ref.
2008	Chris Lee	Best Female (Chinese：年度最佳女歌手)	Won	
2008	Chris Lee	Favorite Female (Chinese: 年度最受欢迎女歌手)	Won	
2008	Chris Lee	SMASH Singer (Chinese: 劲爆最具人气歌手)	Won	
2008	Teenage China (Chinese: 少年中国)	Top Hits (Chinese: 年度金曲)	Won	
2009	Ame (Chinese： 阿么)	Top Hits (Chinese: 年度金曲)	Won	
2009	Chris Lee	Media Recommendation Most Potential Songwriter (Chinese: 传媒推荐最有潜质创作歌手)	Won	
2009	Chris Lee	Favorite Female (Chinese: 年度最受欢迎女歌手)	Won	

== Sprite Music Chart Awards ==
=== Seasonal awards ===
Year	Nominee / work	Award	Result	Ref.
2006	Give Me Five	Golden songs (Mainland China) (Chinese: 年度金曲)	Won	
2006	Chris Lee	Favorite Female Singer (Mainland China) (Chinese: 内地年度最具人气歌手)	Won	
2006	Chris Lee	Excellent Performance (Chinese: 优秀表现奖)	Won	
2006	Chris Lee	Sprite IN Award (Chinese: 雪碧至IN星)	Won	

=== Yearly awards ===
Year	Nominee / work	Award	Result	Ref.
2007	Happy Wake Up	Golden songs (Mainland China) (Chinese: 内地金曲)	Won	
2008	Raining (Chinese: 下雨)	Golden songs (Mainland China) (Chinese: 内地金曲)	Won	
2008	Chris Lee	Best Female Performance (Mainland) (Chinese: 内地最佳演绎女歌手奖)	Won	
2009	Chris Lee	Favorite Female Singer (Mainland China) (Chinese: 内地最受欢迎女歌手)	Won	
2009	Why Me	Golden songs (Mainland China) (Chinese: 内地金曲)	Won	
2009	Teenage China (Chinese: 少年中国)	Best Music Video (Chinese: 年度最优秀视像音乐)	Won	
2010	Shu Embroidery (Chinese: 蜀绣)	Golden songs (Mainland China) (Chinese: 内地金曲)	Won	

== Star Awards ==
Star Awards (Chinese: 星光大典) is a ceremony held by Tencent co. to honor people in movies, television, and music.

Year	Nominee / work	Award	Result	Ref.
2006	Chris Lee	Favorite Female Singer (Mainland) (Chinese: 内地最受欢迎女歌手)	Won	
2010	Chris Lee	Female Singer of the Year (Mainland) (Chinese: 内地年度女歌手)	Won	
2010	Bodyguards and Assassins	Best Newcomer (Mainland) (Chinese: 内地潜力电影新人)	Won	
2012	Chris Lee	Female Singer of the Year (Mainland) (Chinese: 内地年度女歌手)	Won	
2012	Chris Lee	Favorite Female Act on Internet (Chinese: 互联网最受欢迎女艺人)	Won	

== TOM Online Honor Award ==
TOM Online is one of the biggest Chinese internet corporations of the 2000s. The ceremony (Chinese: “网络·娱乐·英雄会”TOM在线荣耀盛典） was held to honor people who gain particularities and had a huge impact on the internet in 2006-2007.

Year	Nominee / work	Award	Result	Ref.
2006	Chris Lee	Most Potential New Artist (Chinese: 最具发展潜力歌手)	Won	

== Top Chinese Music Awards ==
The Top Chinese Music Awards (Chinese: 音乐风云榜年度盛典) is an awards ceremony held annually by Enlight Media since 2001, to honour people in Chinese music.

Year	Nominee / work	Award	Result	Ref.
2006	Chris Lee	Favorite Female Artist (Mainland China) (Chinese: 内地最受欢迎女歌手)	Nominated	
2007	Chris Lee	Best New Artist (Mainland China)	Nominated	
2007	Chris Lee	Favorite Female Artist (Mainland China) (Chinese: 内地最受欢迎女歌手)	Won	
2011	Chris Lee	Favorite Female Artist (Chinese: 最受欢迎女歌手)	Won	
2015	Chris Lee	Favorite Female Artist (Mainland China) (Chinese: 内地最受欢迎女歌手)	Won	

== V Chart Awards ==
Year	Nominee / work	Award	Result	Ref.
2013	Young (Chinese: 似火年华)	Best MV (Chinese: 年度最佳MV)	Won	
2014	Chris Lee	Most Influential Artist of the Year (Chinese: 年度最具影响力艺人)	Won	
2015	Cool (Chinese: 酷)	Best MV (Chinese: 年度最佳MV)	Won	
2016	Chris Lee	Most Influential Asian Singer (Chinese: 亚洲最具影响力歌手)	Won	
2016	Chris Lee	Best Female Singer (Chinese: 年度最佳女歌手)	Won	
2016	Chris Lee	YinYueTai Media Recommendation Artist (Chinese: 音悦Tai年度传媒推荐艺人)	Won	
2016	Chris Lee	Best Stage Performance (Chinese: 年度最具舞台表现)	Won	
