= 2020 in Chinese music =

The following is an overview of 2020 in Chinese music. Music in the Chinese language (Mandarin and Cantonese) and artists from Chinese-speaking countries (Mainland China, Hong Kong, Taiwan, Malaysia, and Singapore) will be included.

== TV shows ==
- Chuang 2020 (May 2 – July 4)
- Sing! China (season 5) (August 21 – November 21)
- Singer (season 8) (February 7 – April 24)
- Youth With You (season 3) (February 18 – May 1)

== Awards ==
- 2020 Chinese Music Awards
- 2020 Chinese Top Ten Music Awards
- 2020 Global Chinese Golden Chart Awards
- 2020 Midi Music Awards
- 2020 MTV Europe Music Awards Best Chinese and Hong Kong Act: R1SE

== Releases ==
=== March ===
Date	Album	Artist	Genre(s)	Ref.
13	Take Over the Moon – Sequel	WayV	Hip hop; Electropop; Trap; R&B	

=== June ===
Date	Album	Artist	Genre(s)	Ref.
9	Awaken the World	WayV	Hip hop; R&B; Trap	

=== July ===
Date	Album	Artist	Genre(s)	Ref.
30	Sparrow	Li Ronghao	Pop	
