= 2025 in Chinese music =

The following is an overview of 2025 in Chinese music. Music in the Chinese language (Mandarin and Cantonese) and artists from Chinese-speaking countries (Mainland China, Hong Kong, Taiwan, Malaysia, and Singapore) will be included. The following includes TV shows that involve Chinese music, award ceremonies, and releases that have occurred.

== Releases ==
=== May ===
Date	Album	Artist	Ref.
9	The Triangle	Zhaoze	

== See also ==
- 2025 in China
  - Music of China
- 2025 in Hong Kong
  - Music of Hong Kong
- 2025 in music
- 2025 in Taiwan
  - Music of Taiwan
    - List of bands from Taiwan
    - List of Taiwanese heavy metal musical groups
- List of C-pop artists
- List of Chinese musicians
- Music of Macau
