= List of awards and nominations received by Liu Yuning =

This is a list of awards and nominations received by Chinese singer and actor Liu Yuning.

== Music ==
| Year | Award | Category | Nominated work | Result | Ref. |
|---|---|---|---|---|---|
| 2019 | 23rd China Music Awards | Best Newcomer of the Year | | Won | |
| 2019 | Chinese Songs Music Festival 2019 | Best Newcomer of the Year | | Won | |
| 2019 | 26th Chinese Top Ten Music Awards | Internet Influence Honor | | Won | |
| 2019 | 26th Chinese Top Ten Music Awards | Media's Pick for the Most Recommended OST | "Toast the Wine" | Won | |
| 2019 | 26th Chinese Top Ten Music Awards | Best New Singer of the Year | | Won | |
| 2019 | Freshasia Annual Song Festival 2019 | Top 10 Golden Songs of the Year (Mainland) | "Not Asking" | Won | |
| 2019 | Freshasia Annual Song Festival 2019 | Best Newcomer of the Year | | Won | |
| 2019 | 1st Tencent Music Entertainment Awards | New Force in Film and Television Songs of the Year | | Won | |
| 2019 | 1st Tencent Music Entertainment Awards | Best New Male Singer of the Year | | Won | |
| 2020 | 27th Chinese Top Ten Music Awards | People's Choice Singer of the Year | | Won | |
| 2020 | 27th Chinese Top Ten Music Awards | Media's Pick for the Most Recommended Album | "Ten" | Won | |
| 2020 | 27th Chinese Top Ten Music Awards | All-Rounded Artist of the Year | | Won | |
| 2020 | 10th Global Chinese Golden Chart Awards | Best New Artist of the Year (Bronze) | | Won | |
| 2021 | 28th Chinese Top Ten Music Awards | Influential Male Singer on the Internet | | Won | |
| 2021 | 28th Chinese Top Ten Music Awards | Most Popular EP | "Listen∙Ning Trilogy" | Won | |
| 2021 | 28th Chinese Top Ten Music Awards | All-Rounded Artist of the Year | | Won | |
| 2021 | 3rd Tencent Music Entertainment Awards | Top Ten Golden Melodies of the Year | "Ask Heaven" | Won | |
| 2022 | 13th Macau International TV Festival Golden Lotus Awards | Best Song in Chinese TV Series | "Ask Heaven" | Nominated | |
| 2022 | Asian Pop Music Awards (APMA) | Best OST of Film and TV Songs (Chinese) | "Light Chaser" | Nominated | |
| 2022 | Weibo Music Awards | Singer of the Year | | Won | |
| 2023 | 30th Chinese Top Ten Music Awards | Most Popular Male Singer | | Won | |
| 2023 | 30th Chinese Top Ten Music Awards | Most Anticipated Performance on Weibo | "Mirage" | Won | |
| 2023 | Weibo Music Awards | Reputable Singer of the Year | | Won | |
| 2023 | Weibo Music Awards | Top 10 Most Recommended Singer of the Year | | Selected | |
| 2024 | Television Series of China Quality Ceremony | Quality Golden Voice of the Year | | Won | |
| 2024 | 31st Chinese Top Ten Music Awards | Asia's Most Influential Male Singer | | Won | |
| 2024 | 31st Chinese Top Ten Music Awards | All-Rounded Artist of the Year | | Won | |
| 2024 | 2nd Digital Music Industry Conference | Film and TV Song of the Year | "You Only Live Once" | Nominated | |
| 2024 | 2nd Digital Music Industry Conference | Game Song of the Year | "To Be Continued" | Nominated | |
| 2024 | Weibo Music Awards | Top 10 Most Recommended Person of the Year | | Selected | |
| 2024 | Weibo Music Awards | Top 10 Most Recommended Song of the Year | "Offer" | Selected | |
| 2024 | Weibo Music Awards | Reputable Singer of the Year | | Won | |
| 2025 | Tencent Music Model Annual Honor Night | Top OST Singer of the Year | | Won | |

== Film and television ==
| Year | Award | Category | Nominated work | Result | Ref. |
|---|---|---|---|---|---|
| 2021 | 8th Wenrong Awards | Best Young Actor in TV Series | The Long Ballad | Nominated | |
| 2023 | Weibo TV & Internet Video Summit | Breakthrough Actor of The Year | Legend of Anle Be Your Own Light | Won | |
| 2024 | Weibo TV & Internet Video Summit | Notable Actor of the Year | A Journey to Love Heroes | Won | |
| 2024 | 15th Macau International TV Festival Golden Lotus Awards | Best Actor | A Journey to Love | Nominated | |
| 2024 | IQIYI Scream Night 2024 | Most expressive actor | A Journey to Love | Won | |
| 2025 | Television Series of China Quality Ceremony | Breakthrough Performance Actor of the Year | The Story of Pearl Girl | Won | |
| 2025 | Weibo TV & Internet Video Summit | Role Model Actor of the Year | The Prisoner of Beauty A Dream Within A Dream | Won | |
| 2025 | IQIYI Scream Night 2025 | Scream Actor | A Dream Within A Dream | Won | |
| 2025 | Tencent All Star Night | Most Popular TV Drama Actor of the Year | The Prisoner Of Beauty | Won | |

== Comprehensive ==
| Year | Award | Category | Nominated work | Result | Ref. |
|---|---|---|---|---|---|
| 2019 | QQ Music "Singer 2019" | Most Popular Golden Song | "Animal world" | Won | |
| 2019 | iQIYI Scream Night | Most Potential Drama Actor of the Year | Hot-Blooded Youth | Won | |
| 2019 | IFENG Fashion Choice | Fashion Breakthrough Pioneer of the Year | | Won | |
| 2019 | COSMO Fashion Festival | Inheritance·Beauty Person of the Year | | Won | |
| 2020 | Boutique Media Style Ceremony | YOUTURE Potential Musician of the Year | | Won | |
| 2020 | Toutiao Annual Awards Ceremony 2019 | New Power Star of the Year | | Won | |
| 2020 | Tencent Entertainment White Paper Awards | Most Promising Singer of the Year | | Won | |
| 2020 | COSMO Fashion Festival | Fearless Fashion Person of the Year | | Won | |
| 2020 | Tencent All Stars Night | Most Potential Singer of the Year | | Won | |
| 2021 | Douyin Stars Night 2020 | Most Popular Musician of the Year | | Won | |
| 2023 | Weibo Awards 2022 | Popular Music Work of the Year | "Looking for You" | Selected | |
| 2023 | Weibo Awards 2022 | Breakthrough Actor of the Year | Heroes | Won | |
| 2023 | Weibo Music Report | Top 10 Recommended Song of the Year | "A Good Year" | Selected | |
| 2024 | Weibo Awards 2023 | Popular Actor of the Year | A Journey to Love | Won | |
| 2024 | iQIYI Scream Night | Expressive Actor of the Year | A Journey to Love | Won | |
| 2024 | Weibo Music Report | Top 10 Recommended Song of the Year | "You Only Live Once" | Selected | |
| 2024 | Tencent All Star Night | Most Prominent Artist of the Year | | Won | |
| 2024 | Tencent All Star Night | Star of the Year for Variety Show | The Truth 2 | Won | |
| 2025 | Weibo Awards 2024 | Popular Actor of the Year | The Story of Pearl Girl | Won | |
| 2025 | Tencent All Star Night | Team of The Year | The Truth 3 | Won | |
| 2025 | Tencent All Star Night | VIP Star Award | Comprehensive | Won | |
| 2026 | Weibo Awards 2025 | Most Popular Actor of the Year | The Prisoner of Beauty A Dream Within a Dream | Won | |
