= 2021 in Chinese music =

The following is an overview of 2021 in Chinese music. Music in the Chinese language (mainly Mandarin and Cantonese) and artists from Chinese-speaking countries (Mainland China, Hong Kong, Taiwan, Malaysia, and Singapore) will be included. The following includes TV shows that involve Chinese music, award ceremonies, and releases that have occurred.

== Award ceremonies ==
2021 music award ceremonies in China, Hong Kong, and Taiwan
Date	Event	Host	Venue	Location	Ref.
January 23	(2020) TMEA (zh)	Tencent Music Entertainment Group	Cotai Arena	Cotai, Macau, China	
November 17	Chinese Top Ten Music Awards	Shanghai Media Group	Shanghai Oriental Sports Center	Shanghai, China	
December 11	TMEA (zh)	Tencent Music Entertainment Group	Cotai Arena	Cotai, Macau, China	
December 25	Migu Music Awards	China Mobile	Online	Online	

== Releases ==
=== March ===
Date	Album	Artist(s)	Genre(s)	Ref.
10	Kick Back	WayV	Hip hop; R&B; Trap	

== See also ==
- 2021 in China
  - Music of China
- 2021 in Hong Kong
  - Music of Hong Kong
- 2021 in music
- 2021 in Taiwan
  - Music of Taiwan
- List of C-pop artists
- List of Chinese musicians
- Music of Macau
