= 2022 in Chinese music =

The following is an overview of 2022 in Chinese music. Music in the Chinese language (mainly Mandarin and Cantonese) and artists from Chinese-speaking countries (Mainland China, Hong Kong, Taiwan, Malaysia, and Singapore) will be included. The following includes TV shows that involve Chinese music, award ceremonies, and releases that have occurred.

== Award ceremonies ==
2022 music award ceremonies in China, Hong Kong, and Taiwan
Date	Event	Host	Venue	Location	Ref.
2022	(2020) CMIC Music Awards	China Audio-video and Digital Publishing Association, CADPA (zh)	—N/a	—N/a	
2022	(2021) CMIC Music Awards	China Audio-video and Digital Publishing Association, CADPA (zh)	—N/a	—N/a	
May 28	Hito Music Awards	Hit FM	Taipei Arena	Songshan, Taipei, Taiwan	
July 2	33rd Golden Melody Awards	Bureau of Audiovisual and Music Industry Development	Kaohsiung Arena	Zuoying, Kaohsiung, Taiwan	
July 24	Hong Kong Gold Songs Award Presentation Ceremony 2021/2022	RTHK and TVB	TVB City	Tseung Kwan O, New Territories, Hong Kong	
November 25	Chinese Top Ten Music Awards	Shanghai Media Group and Hainan Television	Haikou Bay Meiyuan Pier Plaza	Haikou Bay, Haikou, Hainan, China	

== Releases ==
=== December ===
Date	Album	Artist(s)	Genre(s)	Ref.
21	Free Soul	Li Ronghao	Retro	
28	Phantom	WayV	Hip hop; R&B	

== See also ==
- 2022 in China
  - Music of China
- 2022 in Hong Kong
  - Music of Hong Kong
- 2022 in music
- 2022 in Taiwan
  - Music of Taiwan
- List of C-pop artists
- List of Chinese musicians
- Music of Macau
