= 2019 in Chinese music =

The following is an overview of 2019 in Chinese music. Music in the Chinese language (Mandarin and Cantonese) and artists from Chinese-speaking areas (Mainland China, Hong Kong, Taiwan, Malaysia, and Singapore) will be included.

== Charts ==
- Billboard China Top 100

== TV shows ==
- King Maker II (30 September – 6 December)
- Produce Camp 2019 (6 April – 8 June)
- Sing! China (season 4) (19 July – 7 October)
- Singer (season 7) (11 January – 12 April)

== Awards ==
- 9th Global Chinese Golden Chart Awards
- 19th Global Chinese Music Awards
- 26th Chinese Top Ten Music Awards
- 3rd CMIC Music Awards
- 30th Golden Melody Awards
- 17th Hito Music Awards
- 37th Jade Solid Gold Best Ten Music Awards Presentation
- 37th Top Ten Chinese Gold Songs Award

== Debuting ==
=== Groups ===
- R1SE
- Unine
- WayV
- W0LF(S)

== Releases ==
=== First quarter ===
- 17 January: The Vision, single album by WayV

=== Second quarter ===
- 9 May: Take Off, extended play by WayV
- 14 June: Honey, extended play by Lay Zhang

=== Fourth quarter ===
- 25 October: Mirrors, studio album by Jackson Wang
- 29 October: Take Over the Moon, extended play by WayV
- 27 December: City Zoo, studio album by G.E.M.

== See also ==
- 2019 in China
- List of C-pop artists
