= Hello Nico =

Taiwanese rock band

- Origin: Taipei, Taiwan
- Genres: Electronic rock, Indie rock
- Years active: 2014–present
- Labels: Black Market Music
- Members: Chan Yuting; Joshua Lee; Chen Hsinbow; Jimmy Kuan

Hello Nico is a rock band from Taipei, Taiwan.

== History ==
Hello Nico is a Taiwanese alternative rock band founded in 2013. They are best known for their unique depressing and drowning music, as well as the distinctive female voice of their vocalist Yu-Ting Chan. Their music style mixes different genres such as pop, electronic and rock. Their lyrics explore people's emotion; observing the inevitable contradictions and struggles in life. The words and the rhythms of their music are delivered through distorted guitars and layers of synths. With mature arrangements and talented composition, the band became a sensation rapidly after releasing tracks on the Internet in 2013. One of their first singles ‘Flower’ hit No.1 for several weeks on “StreetVoice”, which is the biggest music platform in Chinese-speaking market. The band was also selected as “The Next Big Thing” and “Top Ten New Best Bands” on StreetVoice at the end of 2013.

After signing to the independent music label “Black Market Music Production”, the band released their first five-single EP “Plankton of the City” in Aug 2014, which was highly recommended by many noted musicians and critics in Taiwan and China. In January 2015, Hello Nico released some songs from their first album “Familiar Desolation” on the Internet. Many of the songs topped the ranking list for weeks. In February 2015, the band started selling their album for the first time as digital downloads. As of January 2016, their music video ‘Flower’ had been hit over 1 million times on YouTube.

Hello Nico toured in Taiwan after releasing “Familiar Desolation”. The band was then invited to Hong Kong, Guangzhou, Shanghai and performed many concerts. In July 2015, the band played in the legend venue “Legacy” in Taipei, tickets sold out in a very short time. The concert was also broadcast live on Yahoo, and over 20,000 fans were watching online, which was a solid record for indie bands in Taiwan.

In the second half of 2015, Hello Nico toured 11 cities in China, with many sold-out shows both in China and Taiwan. In December 2015, Hello Nico was nominated for “Best New Artist” in “5th Abbey Road Music Awards” held by “Douban” which is a Chinese authoritative music platform. In the same year the band was nominated for “Best New Artist” of 27th Golden Melody Awards in Taiwan (known as Taiwan's Grammy Award), also won the “Best New Group” of the 9th Fresh Music Awards in Singapore.

In March 2017, they were invited to perform in SXSW.

== Discography ==
- Plankton of the City(EP) (2013)
- Familiar Desolation (2015)
- Impression (EP) (2016)

== Music video ==
- 面向自己(What I am)
- 看不見？(The melting sweetland)
- 接下來如何 (Now and Then)
- 花 (Flower)
- 哭泣的橄欖樹(Morning in Jenin)
- 荒蕪(Wasteland)
