= List of bands from Taiwan =

This is a list of bands from Taiwan, officially the Republic of China (ROC), excluding pop music groups:

- 1976
- 831
- Accusefive
- Bestards
- Cherry Boom
- Chthonic
- deca joins
- Dong Cheng Wei
- EggPlantEgg
- Elephant Gym
- F.I.R.
- Funky Brothers
- Hello Nico
- Lion
- LTK Commune
- Mayday
- New Formosa Band
- No Party for Cao Dong
- Sodagreen
- Shin
- Sunset Rollercoaster
- Superband
- The Muddy Basin Ramblers
- Your Woman Sleep With Others
