= Shenzhen Bay Sports Center =

Sports venue in Shenzhen, China

Shenzhen Bay Sports Center 深圳湾体育中心
- Spring Cocoon (春茧)
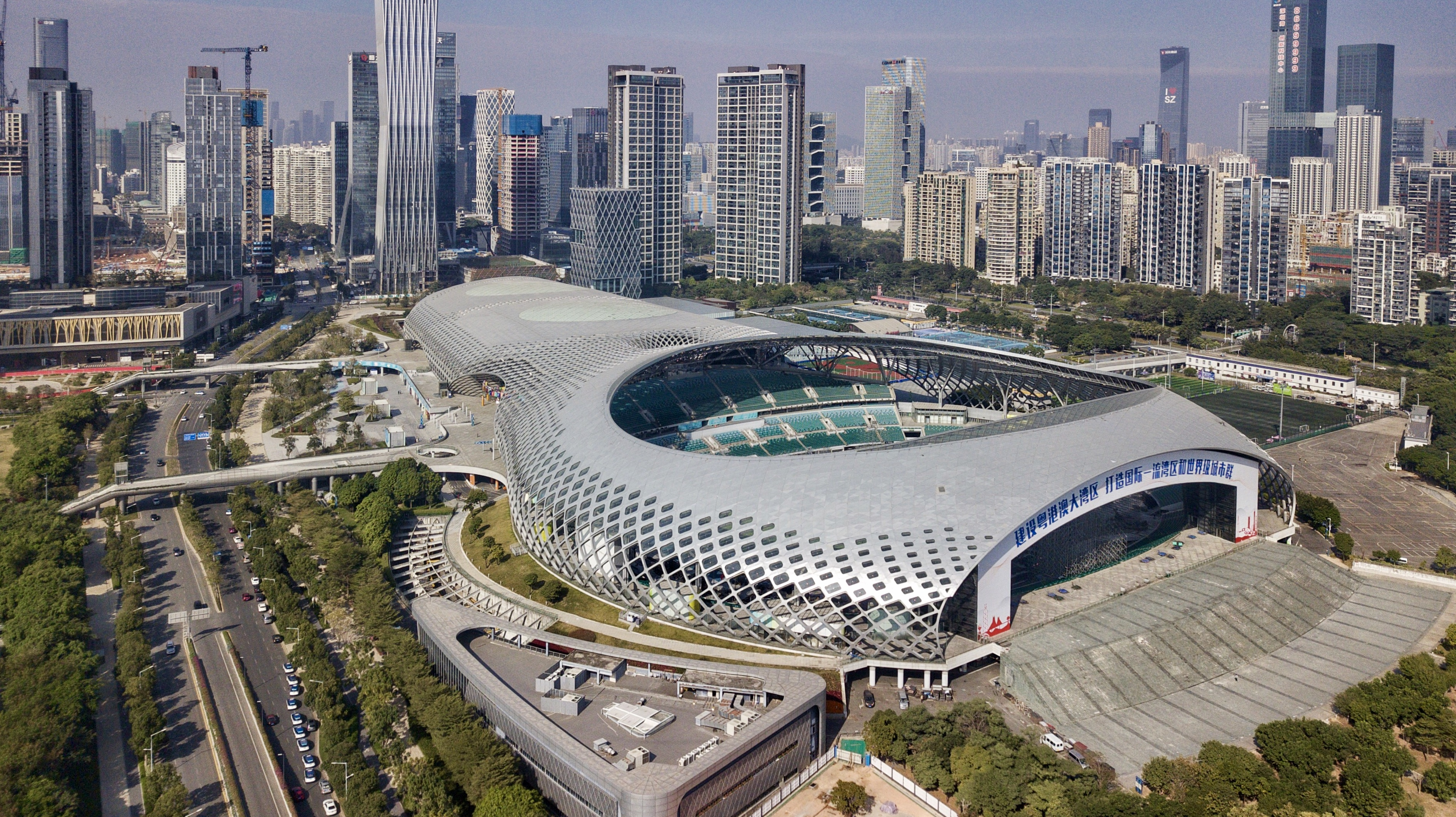
- Shenzhen Bay Sports Center in December 2020
- Interactive map of Shenzhen Bay Sports Center 深圳湾体育中心
- Address: 3001 Binhai Ave, Nanshan District, Shenzhen, Guangdong, China 518604
- Coordinates: 22°31′15″N 113°56′45″E
- Owner: Shenzhen Municipal People's Government
- Operator: Culture, Media, Tourism and Sports Bureau of Shenzhen Municipality
- Capacity: 20,000 (stadium); 13,000 (gymnasium)
- Surface: Grass

Construction
- Built: 2009–2011
- Opened: April 2011
- Cost: $2.3 billion
- Architects: AXS Satow; Beijing Urban Engineering Design & Research Institute

Website
- http://www.springcocoon.com/

Shenzhen Bay Sports Center (Chinese: 深圳湾体育中心), nicknamed Spring Cocoon (Chinese: 春茧) for its shape, is a multiuse stadium in Shenzhen, China. It is used mostly for table tennis, swimming and soccer competitions. The stadium is known for hosting the annual RoboMaster Robotics Competition since 2015, as well as the opening ceremony and some events of the 2011 Summer Universiade. The stadium has a capacity of 20,000 spectators and the gymnasium seats 13,000. The Sports Center also hosts regular concerts and has been used as a military staging area.

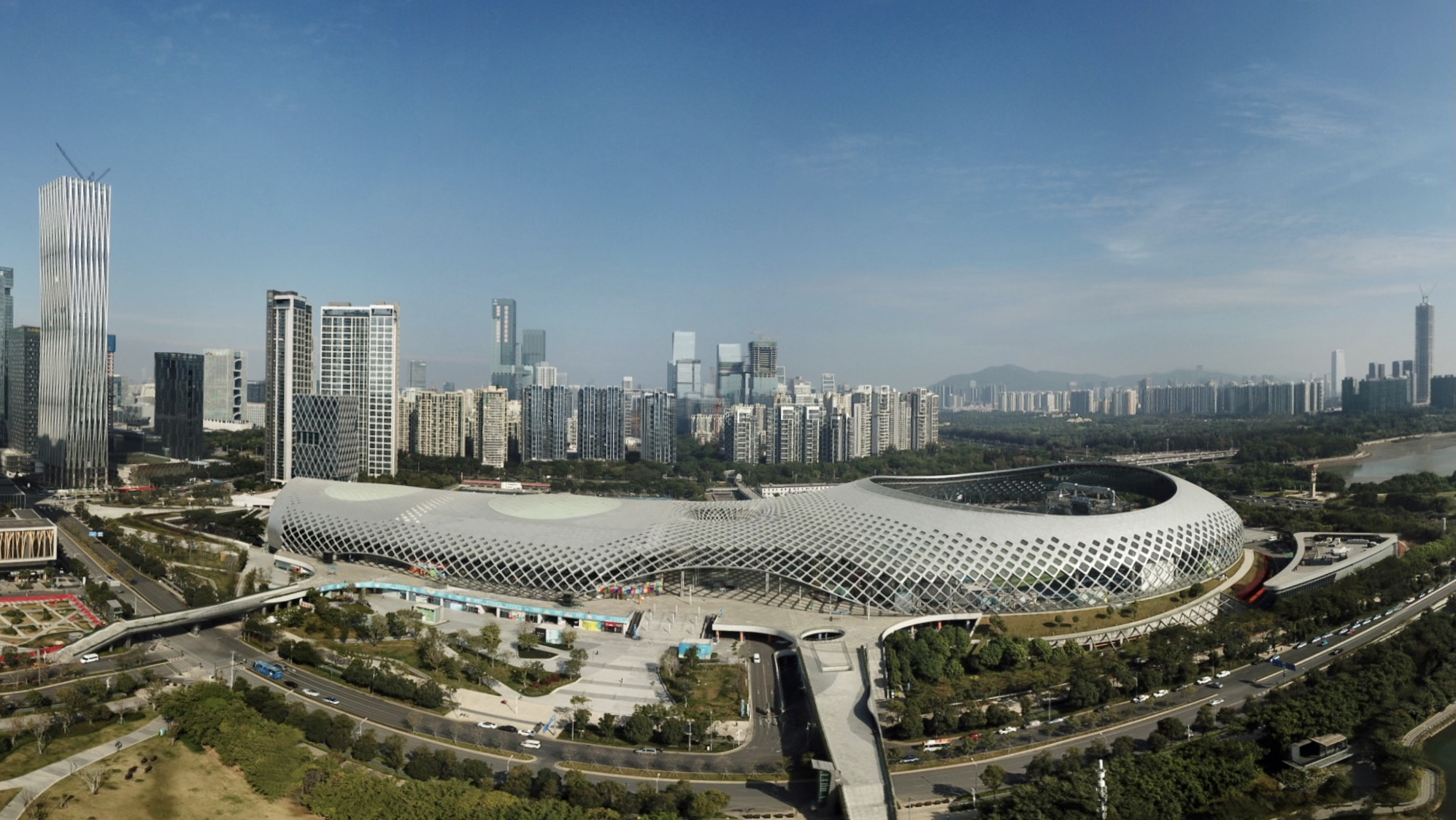
Front view of Shenzhen Bay Sports Center

== Construction ==
An international design competition for the building was held in early 2008, and preparatory work began in November of the same year. Built on reclaimed land, the foundations were laid in February 2009, and the building was completed in mid-2011. The building consists of three arenas, a swimming pool, an indoor arena, and a multi-use stadium joined by a perforated external steel skin. Within the complex is 30-story office tower.

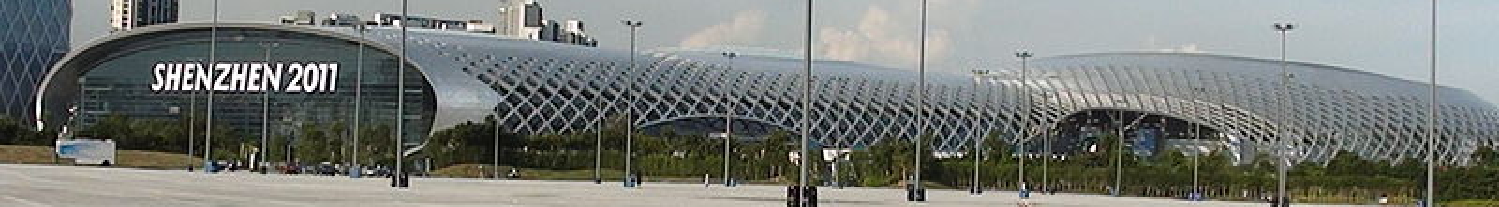
Panorama showing the full length of the sports center

== Transport ==
The stadium is within walking distance from Houhai station of Shenzhen Metro and is at the proximity of the Nanshan Central business district development.

== Hong Kong protests ==
During the 2019–20 Hong Kong protests, satellite images showed the stadium being used to house more than 100 military APCs (armored personnel carriers) and trucks. Reporters from the Dutch news service Nederlandse Omroep Stichting later used an unmanned aerial vehicle to capture film footage the military performing anti-riot training exercises.

== Notable nonsporting events ==
Stadium

- Joker Xue – Skyscraper World Tour – July 28, 2018
- Mariah Carey – Mariah Carey: Live in Concert
- Westlife – The Wild Dreams Tour – September 17, 2023

Arena

- S.H.E – 2gether 4ever World Tour – May 17, 2014
- Joker Xue – I Think I've Seen You Somewhere Tour – April 29, 2017
- Jessie J – The R.O.S.E Tour – September 12, 2018

Preceded by Belgrade Arena; Belgrade	Summer Universiade opening ceremony 2011	Succeeded by Kazan Arena; Kazan
