= List of Taiwanese heavy metal musical groups =

This is a list of metal bands from Taiwan.

== A ==
- Anthelion (Symphonic Black Metal) 幻日

== C ==
- ChthoniC (Death/Symphonic Black/Folk Metal) 閃靈樂團

== E ==
- Elephant Gym (Math Rock) 大象體操

== F ==
- Fire EX. (Punk Rock) 滅火器

== N ==
- No Party for Cao Dong (Indie Rock) 草東沒有派對

== S ==
- Seraphim (Melodic/Power Metal) 六翼天使樂團
