= Midi Music Awards =

The Midi Music Awards, also called Midi Rock Music Awards or simply Midi Awards (Chinese: 中国摇滚迷笛奖) are an annual awards presented by the Beijing Midi School of Music since 2009. Unlike the various Chinese music awards that honors pop music, the Midi Music Awards highlights the outstanding Chinese rock (pop rock, hard rock, metal, folk, etc.) acts of the past calendar year. The fourth annual Midi Music Awards was held at the MasterCard Center (Wukesong Center) in Beijing.

== Categories ==
The following are the competitive categories:

- Album of the Year (最佳年度摇滚专辑)
- Song of the Year (最佳年度摇滚歌曲)
- Best Rock Performance By Group With Vocals (最佳年度摇滚乐队)
- Best Male Rock Vocal Performance (最佳年度摇滚男歌手)
- Best Female Rock Vocal Performance (最佳年度摇滚女歌手 )
- Best Hard Rock Performance (最佳年度硬摇滚乐队)
- Best Metal Performance (最佳年度金属乐队)
- Best Rock Instrumental Performance (最佳年度摇滚乐器演奏)
- Best Live Performance (最佳年度摇滚现场)
- Best New Artist (最佳年度摇滚新人奖)
- Best Album Art (最佳年度专辑设计奖)
- Best Folk Music (最佳年度民谣音乐奖)

Special awards:

- Award For Special Contribution to Chinese Rock (中国摇滚贡献奖)
