= Top Chinese Music Awards =

- The 16th award ceremony logo
- Country: China
- First award: 2001; 25 years ago

The Top Chinese Music Awards (Chinese: 音乐风云榜年度盛典) is an annual music awards to recognize Chinese popular music artists and works. The Top Chinese Music Awards was established in 2001 and is held in China. The awards have been described by the media as China's equivalent of the Grammys in the United States.

== Ceremonies ==
Year	Venue	Location
2001	Shenzhen Theatre	Shenzhen
2002	Shenzhen Theatre	Shenzhen
2003	Shenzhen Theatre	Shenzhen
2004	Shenzhen Theatre	Shenzhen
2005	Beijing Olympic Sports Center Gymnasium	Beijing
2006	Beijing Exhibition Center	Beijing
2007	Beijing Exhibition Center	Beijing
2008	Beijing Exhibition Center	Beijing
2009	Beijing Exhibition Center	Beijing
2010	Shenzhen Theatre	Shenzhen
2011	Yulan Theatre	Dongguan
2012	Poly Theatre	Shenzhen
2013	Poly Theatre	Shenzhen
2014	Shenzhen Bay Sports Center	Shenzhen
2015	Shenzhen Bay Sports Center	Shenzhen
2016	Shenzhen Bay Sports Center	Shenzhen
2017	Shenzhen Bay Sports Center	Shenzhen

== Categories ==
2017 Top Chinese Music Awards

- Best Male Singer
- Best Female Singer
- Best All-Round Artist
- Most Influential Award
- Best Film Song
- Best Rock Artist/Group
- Best Ballad Artist/Group
- Best Crossover Idol
- Most Popular Singer-Songwriter
- Most Popular Group
- Most Popular Overseas Artist
- Most Popular Quality Singer
- Most Popular Potential Idol
- Media Recommend Singer-Songwriter
- Media Recommend Internet Idol
- Best New Singer-Songwriter
- Best New Idol
