= MTV Europe Music Award for Best Greater China Act =

Category of MTV Europe Music Awards

The following is a list of the MTV Europe Music Award winners and nominees for Best Greater China Act.

== Winners and nominees ==
=== 2010s ===
Year	Artist	Nationality	Ref
2013
2013	Chris Lee	China	
2013	Eason Chan	Hong Kong	
2013	Jane Zhang	China	
2013	Khalil Fong	Hong Kong	
2013	Sun Nan	China	
2014
2014	Bibi Zhou	China	
2014	Wang Feng	China	
2014	G.E.M.	Hong Kong	
2014	Jason Zhang	China	
2014	Pre-nominations: Moraynia Liu; Vision Wei; Hu Xia		
2015
2015	Jane Zhang	China	
2015	Han Geng	China	
2015	Leo Ku	Hong Kong	
2015	Tan Weiwei	China	
2015	Uniq	China	
2016
2016	G.E.M.	Hong Kong	
2016	Pu Shu	China	
2016	Wu Mochou	China	
2016	Khalil Fong	Hong Kong	
2016	Vision Wei	China	
2017
2017	Henry Huo	China	
2017	Bii	Taiwan	
2017	He Jie	China	
2017	Pakho Chau	Hong Kong	
2017	Silence Wang	China	
2018
2018	Lou Yixiao	China	
2018	Stringer Zhang	China	
2018	Silence Wang	China	
2018	Lala Hsu	Taiwan	
2018	Alex To	Hong Kong	
2019
2019	Zhou Shen	China	
2019	Click#15	China	
2019	Fiona Sit	Hong Kong	
2019	Shin	Taiwan	
2019	Timmy Xu	China	
2019	Feng Timo	China	

=== 2020s ===
Year	Artist	Nationality	Ref
2020
2020	R1SE	China	
2020	AGA	Hong Kong	
2020	Feng Timo	China	
2020	R1SE	China	
2020	Waa Wei	Taiwan	
2020	Timmy Xu	China	
