= Music of Hong Kong =

The Music of Hong Kong is an eclectic mixture of traditional and popular genres. Cantopop is one of the more prominent genres of music produced in Hong Kong. The Hong Kong Philharmonic Orchestra and the Hong Kong Sinfonietta regularly perform western classical music in the city. There is also a long tradition of Cantonese opera within Hong Kong.

== History ==
In colonial Hong Kong, pipa was one of the instruments played by the Chinese, and was mainly used for ceremonial purposes. Western classical music was, on the other hand, the principal focus amongst British Hong Kongers with the Sino-British Orchestra being established in 1895. In the beginning of the 20th century, Western pop music became popular. Mandarin pop songs in the 1920s were called Si Doi Kuk (時代曲). They are considered the prototype of Chinese pop songs.

In 1949 the People's Republic of China was established by the communist party. One of the first actions taken by the government was to denounce popular music as pornography. Beginning in the 1950s massive waves of immigrants fled from Shanghai to Hong Kong. Along with it was the Pathé Records (Hong Kong) record company, which ended up becoming one of the most significant popular record companies in Hong Kong.

The Western music was popular since 1950s as the official language was English at that time. Also, listening to Western music showed a person's good taste. Cantopop was not popular in 1950s to 1960s since the production of Cantopop was shoddy. During the late 1960s and 1970s, Mandarin pop songs were getting more and more popular and became the mainstream of Hong Kong pop. In the 1970s, Hong Kong audiences wanted popular music in their own dialect, Cantonese. Also, a Cantonese song Tai siu yan yun (啼笑姻緣) became the first theme song of a TV drama. Cantopop was getting popular after that.

Cantopop's popularity increased sharply due to the improved status of the language and the large Cantonese Chinese population in the city. Traditional Chinese Huangmei opera, on the other hand, had peaked in the 1960s amongst the general Chinese population.

== Market ==
As an "open economy", a vast variety of music is commercially available in Hong Kong. Most retail music stores in Hong Kong carry Cantopop, Mandopop, imported English language pop music, Japanese pop music and Korean pop music. Larger music stores, such as HMV in Hong Kong, stock a more extensive range which includes classical music, Cantonese opera in addition to the aforementioned genres. Like Japan, audio cassettes have never been big sellers in Hong Kong.

== Music ==
=== Cantonese opera ===
The art form is one of the first organised forms of entertainment in Hong Kong. The art form still exists today in its traditional format despite the changing trends in other industries. There is a debate about the origin(s) of Cantonese opera, but it is universally accepted that the predecessors of Cantonese opera originated from the northern part of China and slowly migrated to the southern province of Guangdong in late 13th century, during the late Southern Song dynasty. Beginning in the 1950s, massive waves of immigrants fled Shanghai to destinations like North Point, boosting its fanbase.

=== Naamyam ===
Cantonese Naamyam (Chinese: 南音; Jyutping: naam4 jam1) is a unique narrative singing tradition in Cantonese dialect/language, different from Fujian Nan Yin. A singer would be engaged for a single performance or for regular performances over an extended period of time. Before the first half of the 20th century, naamyam sung by blind singers was a popular form of entertainment in Hong Kong and Canton. Common venues for performance included public places such as restaurants, teahouses, brothels, and opium dens, semi-public clubs and gathering places that catered to a particular trade or craft, such as butchers or rice merchants, and private households.

=== Cantopop ===
Prior to the development of popular music in the 1960s, Hong Kong's musical output was dominated by Cantonese opera and English pop. Prominent singers included Tang Kee-chan (鄧寄塵), Cheng Kuan-min (鄭君綿). The godfather of Cantopop Roman Tam (羅文) made significant strides in the industry. The youth began to gravitate towards Cantonese pop in the 70s.

Around 1971, Sandra Lang (仙杜拉) was invited to sing the first Cantonese TV theme song, "The Yuanfen of a Wedding that Cries and Laughs" (啼笑姻緣). This song was the creation of the legendary songwriter Joseph Koo (顧嘉輝) and the songwriter Yip Siu-dak (葉紹德). The genre was launched to unprecedented levels with virtually every TV drama using localised cantopop songs. Other notable pioneers for cantopop were Sam Hui, Jenny Tseng, Liza Wang and Paula Tsui.

In 1980s, the surge of Hong Kong pop wave expanded rapidly. The music scene was dominated by pop icons Leslie Cheung, Anita Mui, Alan Tam, and Danny Chan. The industry used Cantopop songs in TV dramas and movies, with some of the biggest soundtracks coming from films such as A Better Tomorrow. There were also many Cantopop songs that were adapted from Japanese music.

While TV theme songs are still an important part of Hong Kong music, the arrival of the Four Heavenly Kings took Cantopop a stage higher. Today, Cantopop is the dominant form of music with strong associations to pop culture. Record companies have had a majority stake in the segment, and Hong Kong is considered the central hub of Cantopop in the world.

=== Mandarin pop ===
After the Communist takeover in mainland China in 1949, the Mandarin pop music and entertainment industry shifted to Hong Kong. Mandarin also dominated the language of cinematography until the emergence of Cantonese counterparts in the mid-1970s. Many singers from Taiwan came to Hong Kong creating a spectrum of Mandarin pop. The period ended in its height with Teresa Teng. Her songs were popular even in mainland China. One of the TV series that emulate the 60s/70s mandopop club scene in Hong Kong is the TVB series Glittering Days.

=== English pop ===
The term English pop in Hong Kong does not mean pop music from England, but western style pop songs sung in the English language. In the 1950s, popular music of Hong Kong was largely dominated by pop songs in the English language until the Cantopop's emergence in the mid-1970s. Many well-known Cantopop singers of today, like Sam Hui and Alan Tam, began their early careers singing in English. Western culture at the time was specifically a mark of education and sophistication. Inspired and influenced by imported popular music from the West such as Elvis Presley, Johnny Mathis and The Beatles, Hong Kong artistes started to produce English language pop music in the 1960s.

Today, imported pop music in English language remains popular in Hong Kong, second only to C-pop. Most Hong Kong artists now sing primarily in Cantonese and Mandarin and occasionally perform in English. Artists who produced substantial works in English include Chet Lam, The Pancakes, Ghost Style, etc. Jacky Cheung released an English album in 2000. Other artistes who have native fluency in English include Jackson Wang, Teresa Carpio, Janice Vidal, Jill Vidal, Karen Joy Morris, Fiona Sit, Edison Chen, etc.

=== Classical music ===
Western classical music has a strong presence in Hong Kong. Organisations such as The Hong Kong Philharmonic Orchestra, Hong Kong Sinfonietta and the Hong Kong Chinese Orchestra receives substantial annual funding from the Hong Kong Government and other major sponsors such as the Swire Group. The budget of Hong Kong Philharmonic Orchestra in 2002/2003 financial year was HK$86 million, of which 70% comes from The Hong Kong Government. Their production adds dynamics to the music culture. All primary and secondary school students in Hong Kong are required to take music class as part of their school curriculum.

=== Electronic music ===
Being a burgeoning genre in the music scene, Hong Kong's history with electronic music is deep and complex. During the 70s and 80s, artists like Leslie Cheung and Anita Mui have experimented with fusion between disco music and Cantopop . In present day, underground electronic scenes and electronic music festivals such as Shi Fu Miz Festival and Creamfields Hong Kong plays an important role spreading electronic music culture in the city. Meanwhile, local electronic music musicians such as dannyshoinz, Zight and XTIE seek to collaborate with foreign artists, connecting and bridging Hong Kong's electronic music industry to the outside world. DJ King of C AllStar solo works are electronic music. EDM composers in 2020s: dannyshoinz, JNYBeatz, VAL and CK of STRAYZ, Claudia Koh.

=== Festivals ===
- Rockit Hong Kong Music Festival

=== Music recording certification ===
IFPI Hong Kong certifies music recordings in Hong Kong. Like some other Asian countries, the sales requirements of domestic products are higher than foreign products and certifications are usually based on sales. The sales requirements are 25,000 and 50,000 copies for gold and platinum, respectively, before 2006. It was lowered in 2006 and 2008, due to declining sales. The sales requirements are 20,000 and 40,000 copies for releases between 1 January 2006, and 31 December 2007. Currently, the requirements are 15,000 copies for Gold and 30,000 copies for Platinum. International repertoire requires only half of the Gold and Platinum awards from the domestic ones, same as classical music albums. (Before 2006, 15,000 and 25,000 copies for gold and platinum for foreign repertoire, respectively).

=== National anthem ===
Hong Kong has never had a separate national anthem to the country that controlled it; its current official national anthem is therefore that of China, March of the Volunteers. The song Glory to Hong Kong has been used by protestors as an unofficial national anthem.

== Platforms in 2020s ==
=== Music Streaming Services ===
KKBOX, MOOV, Spotify, Apple Music, JOOX and YouTube Music. KKBOX holds music award every year.

=== Radios ===
Commercial Radio Hong Kong, Metro Broadcast Corporation and RTHK. They reveal music charts every week and hold music awards every year.

=== TV ===
ViuTV has music show "Chill Club" and reveal music chart every Sunday. It holds "Chlll Club Awards" every year. TVB has music show "JSG" and reveal music chart every week. It holds "Solid Gold Best Ten Music Awards Presentation" every year.

=== Music Videos ===
YouTube, ViuTV's "Chill Club 推介" (Chill Club Song Promotion): 30 minutes from Monday to Friday, TVB's "無間音樂".

=== Buying Music ===
- Retail Stores: "CD Warehouse" has 12 shops in shopping malls.
- Online Store (CD): YesAsia, CD Warehouse
- Online (Audio): iTunes

=== Paid Concert Online Streaming ===
Mifashow, MakeALive

=== Concert Venues ===
- Indoor: Hong Kong Coliseum; AsiaWorld-Expo; Kowloonbay International Trade & Exhibition Centre, Hong Kong Convention and Exhibition Centre and Macpherson Stadium, Hong Kong
- Outdoor: Central Harbourfront and West Kowloon Cultural District

=== Social Media Sites ===
Singers post their updates on Instagram, Facebook and YouTube.

== See also ==
- Hong Kong Music venues
- MTV Networks Asia
- Gangtai culture
- Music of United Kingdom
- Music of China
- Music of Japan
- Music sampling in Hong Kong
- Music of United States
