= Music of Macau =

The music of Macau is a mixture of Cantonese and Portuguese music, formed by its proximity and governance under China and the legacy of the Portuguese colonial period.

The musical institutions in the city include the Macao Orchestra, the Macau Youth Symphony Orchestra and the Macao Conservatory, which has played an important role in music education in the area since its foundation in 1991. The Macao International Music Festival is an important annual event.

Xian Xinghai, a very influential Chinese composer, was born in Macau.

The pop music in Macau is still in an early period. However, the boy band Soler has gone to Hong Kong develop their music career.

== History ==
This kind of hybrid music had its boom in early 20th century and the groups that used to perform it were called "Tunas". In Portugal, the "tuna" groups consisted of young men which would get together at universities and form estudiantina-like groups, but in Macau, this kind of musical group took a different orientation, blending it with Carnival ballroom celebrations and street festivities. The repertoire consisted of carnival marches, ballads, waltzes, Cantonese-inspired ballads, fados, polkas, etc.

One of the most known songs from this period was the version in Patuá for the Brazilian carnival march "Mamãe eu Quero", which received the title "Mama Sa Filo". Also, the popular Portuguese song "Oh Careca tira a bóina" (Portuguese for: Hey bald man, take off the beret) received also a Macanese version, named "Sium Careca”; also worth of mention are the version in patuá for the fado song "Uma Casa Portuguesa", named "Unga Casa Macaísta" and the songs "Bastiana" and "Assi Sa Macau". This last one is a composition of the cultist of patuá language in the territory, the poet, composer and theatre director José dos Santos Ferreira, nicknamed "Adé", a prolific composer of music in patuá.

The Macanese group Tuna Macaense, with which Adé was closely associated, emerged in 1935 and still perform today, although with some changes in its line-up. It currently has eight members (António Lopes – mandolim, guitar, vocal and percurssion; Rui Coelho – mandolim, bass, solo guitar and singing; Filomena Jorge – bass, rhythm guitar, solo guitar and singing; Carlos Pereira – drums and percussion; Judas Manhão Jorge – solo guitar; Pedro Santos – bass and percurssion; Isabel Carvalhal – singing and percussion; A Yiu - keyboard).
