= Music Radio China Top Chart Awards =

Chinese music award

The Music Radio China Top Chart Awards (Chinese: Music Radio 中国 Top 排行榜颁奖典礼) is a music awards ceremony founded by China National Radio in 2003. The awards are awarded on the basis of votes by a poll of the public and fans, who can usually vote through websites or via SMS. The first two ceremonies used to be called Music IN China Pop Chart Awards (Chinese: Music IN中国歌曲排行榜颁奖晚会). In 2005, it was officially called as MusicRadio China Top Chart Awards.

== Ceremonies ==
Year	Venue	Location
2003	Quanzhou Stadium	Quanzhou
2004	Mount Tai Stadium	Tai'an
2005	Beijing National Stadium	Beijing
2006	Shanghai Gymnasium	Shanghai
2007	Shanghai Gymnasium	Shanghai
2008	Workers' Stadium	Beijing
2009	Workers' Stadium	Beijing
2010	Workers' Stadium	Beijing
2011	Workers' Stadium	Beijing
2012	Jinan Olympic Sports Center Stadium	Jinan
2013	MasterCard Center	Beijing
2014	MasterCard Center	Beijing
2015	MasterCard Center	Beijing
2016	MasterCard Center	Beijing
2017	Mercedes-Benz Arena	Shanghai

== Categories ==
2017 Music Radio China Top Chart Awards

- Most Popular Male Singer (Mainland China)
- Most Popular Male Singer (Hong Kong/Taiwan)
- Most Popular Female Singer (Mainland China)
- Most Popular Female Singer (Hong Kong/Taiwan)
- Most Popular Album
- Best New Artist
- Campus Favorite Award (Solo)
- Campus Favorite Award (Group/Band)
- Best Male Singer (Mainland China)
- Best Male Singer (Hong Kong/Taiwan)
- Best Female Singer (Mainland China)
- Best Female Singer (Hong Kong/Taiwan)
- Best Male Singer-Songwriter
- Best Female Singer-Songwriter
- Best Album
- Best Producer
- Best Composer
- Best Lyricist
- Media Recommend Award (Solo)
- Media Recommend Award (Group/Band)
- Best Stage Performance (Solo)
- Best Stage Performance (Group/Band)
- Best Crossover Artist
- Music Radio Recommend Award (Solo)
- Music Radio Recommend Album (Group/Band)
