= List of C-pop artists =

List which encompasses mainly Mandopop and Cantopop pop music

This is a list of C-pop artists and groups. C-pop, which encompasses mainly Mandopop and Cantopop (and to some extent Hokkien pop and pop music of other Chinese dialects), represents the main pop music in the People's Republic of China, Taiwan, Hong Kong, Macau, Malaysia and Singapore, as well as Chinese-speaking communities in the rest of the world.

Almost all popular actors and actresses in Chinese entertainment have released songs to boost their popularity, and thus technically are considered C-pop artists. The list below only includes those whose musical careers are significant, although that is hard to define objectively.

Popular Chinese rock and hip hop artists are also included.

== Female artists ==
- A-fu
- A-Lin
- A-mei
- A-Sun
- AGA
- Alan Dawa Dolma
- Priscilla Chan
- Angela Chang
- Deserts Chang
- Cheer Chen
- Kelly Chen
- Sammi Cheng
- Maggie Chiang
- Vivian Chow
- Tanya Chua
- Genie Chuo
- Gillian Chung
- Leah Dou
- Christine Fan
- Mavis Fan
- Mavis Hee
- Denise Ho
- Elva Hsiao
- Jeannie Hsieh
- Winnie Hsin
- Evonne Hsu
- Lala Hsu
- Valen Hsu
- Vivian Hsu
- Ivy
- Amber Kuo
- Claire Kuo
- Sandy Lam
- Coco Lee
- Fish Leong
- Gigi Leung
- Li Yuchun
- Linda Liao
- Duan Linxi
- Rene Liu
- Liu Shishi
- Liu Yuxin
- Candy Lo
- Lu Keran
- Karen Mok
- Anita Mui
- Na Ying
- Kary Ng
- One-Fang
- Cass Phang
- Wanting Qu
- Sa Dingding
- Fiona Sit
- Tarcy Su
- Stefanie Sun
- Sunnee
- Penny Tai
- G.E.M. Tang
- Stephy Tang
- Teresa Teng
- Hebe Tien
- Tsai Chin
- Jolin Tsai
- Kay Tse
- Janice Vidal
- Cyndi Wang
- Joanna Wang
- Landy Wen
- Meng Jia
- Faye Wong
- Ivana Wong
- Xidan Girl
- Faith Yang
- Rainie Yang
- Bella Yao
- Sally Yeh
- Miriam Yeung
- Joey Yung
- Jane Zhang
- Jana Chen
- Zhao Wei
- Fong Fei Fei
- Yangwei Linghua
- Jenny Tseng
- Bibi Zhou
- Zhang Zining
- Curley G
- Wang Yijin
- Liu Xiening
- Chen Zhuoxuan
- Nene
- Cheng Xiao
- Wu Xuanyi
- Meng Meiqi
- Zhao Yue
- Ju Jingyi
- Yu Yan
- Xie Keyin
- Xu Ziyin
- Zhou Jieqiong

== Male artists ==
- Huang Zitao
- Bi Wenjun
- Cai Xukun
- Chang Chen-yue
- Daniel Chan
- Danny Chan
- Eason Chan
- Jackie Chan
- Jordan Chan
- Jeff Chang
- Yu Jingtian
- Phil Chang
- Chang Yu-Sheng
- Gary Chaw
- Pakho Chau
- Wakin Chau
- Bobby Chen
- Chen Chusheng
- Edison Chen
- Chen Linong
- Ronald Cheng
- Dicky Cheung
- Hins Cheung
- Hua Chenyu
- Jacky Cheung
- Leslie Cheung
- Chyi Chin
- Chou Chuan-huing
- Eric Chou
- Jay Chou
- Cui Jian
- Fan Chengcheng
- Van Fan
- Khalil Fong
- Han Geng
- Jam Hsiao
- Hsiao Huang-chi
- Anson Hu
- Hu Xia
- Stanley Huang
- Yida Huang
- Andy Hui
- Samuel Hui
- Richie Jen
- Justin
- Joseph Koo
- Aaron Kwok
- Leo Ku
- Kun
- Chet Lam
- Leon Lai
- Andy Lau
- Hacken Lee
- Nicky Lee
- Edmond Leung
- Li Wenhan
- JJ Lin
- Yoga Lin
- Lin Yanjun
- Liu Huan
- Show Lo
- Lo Ta-yu
- Crowd Lu
- Luhan
- MC HotDog
- Anthony Neely
- Will Pan
- Pu Shu
- Sun Nan
- William So
- Alan Tam
- David Tao
- Nicholas Tse
- Wang Feng
- Jackson Wang
- Jiro Wang
- Karry Wang
- Leehom Wang
- Roy Wang
- Wang Yibo
- Vision Wei
- Winwin
- Anthony Wong
- Dave Wong
- Lucas
- Michael Wong
- Wu Bai
- Kenji Wu
- Kris Wu
- Xie Hexian
- Xu Song
- Xu Wei
- Aaron Yan
- Yang Pei-An
- Jackson Yi
- Zeng Yi
- Evan Yo
- You Zhangjing
- Harlem Yu
- Joker Xue
- Xiao Zhan
- Jason Zhang
- Lay Zhang
- Zhou Yixuan
- Zhou Zhennan
- Zhu Zhengting
- Zuoxiao Zuzhou
- Liu Yu
- Santa Uno
- Rikimaru Chikada
- Mika Hashizume
- Nine
- Lin Mo
- Bo Yuan
- Zhang Jiayuan
- Zhou Keyu
- Patrick Yin Haoyu
- Liu Zhang

== Music groups and bands ==
- 183 Club
- 2moro
- 4 in Love
- 5566
- A-One
- at17
- BEJ48
- Beyond
- BoBo
- BonBon Girls
- Boy Story
- Boy'z
- BY2
- C AllStar
- Catchers
- Choc7
- Comic Boyz
- Da Mouth
- Dream Girls
- Energy
- EO2
- F.I.R.
- F4
- Fahrenheit
- Fanxy Red
- Four Golden Princess
- INTO1
- Grasshopper
- GNZ48
- I Me
- JPM
- K One
- Lollipop F
- M-Girls
- Mayday
- M.I.C.
- My little airport
- Nan Quan Mama
- NEXT
- Nine Percent
- Phoenix Legend
- Popu Lady
- Power Station
- Produce Pandas
- R1SE
- Rocket Girls
- RubberBand
- S.H.E
- Shin
- Super Impassioned Net Generation
- SNH48
- Sodagreen
- SpeXial
- Sweety
- Tension
- TFBOYS
- Teens In Times
- The Flowers
- The9
- Top Combine
- TransForm Project
- Twins
- UNINE
- UNIQ
- WayV
- Xiao Hu Dui
- X Nine
- Y2J
- Yu Quan
- ZERO-G

== See also ==
- List of Chinese musicians
- List of bands from Taiwan
  - Metal bands of Taiwan
- List of Taiwanese people
- List of Hong Kong people
- List of Singaporeans
- List of J-pop artists
- List of K-pop artists
- Music of China
- Music of Taiwan
- Music of Hong Kong
- Music of Macau
- Music of Singapore
