= China Music Awards =

Chinese Music Awards

The China Music Awards (Chinese: 全球華語榜中榜) is an annual Chinese music award established by Channel V in 1994. It is organized by Channel V parent company Star China Media.

Held annually each spring, the scope of awards includes "most influential singer and song." Because of its long history and numerous celebrity attendees, it holds considerable influence in Chinese music circles. The first award ceremony was limited to Greater China's' cable and satellite TV broadcasters. In 1998, the fifth session began expand to Mainland China terrestrial television broadcasts, and was co-hosted by China Central Television and some local stations in Mainland China such as Dragon Television, Chengdu Broadcast Station, Beijing Radio and Television Station (before 2001 known as Beijing Cable TV Station). The original ceremony had ony 20 song awards, but it later added various awards by region and gender. Every session saw the addition of other categories, but some media believed the usage of excessive awards caused the value of these awards to decline.

Starting from the 14th session, it was changed to the Global Chinese Music Awards which provides awards beyond music categories.
