= Global Chinese Music Awards =

Annual Chinese music awards ceremony

- Country: China; Hong Kong; Taiwan; Malaysia; Singapore
- First award: 2000

Television/radio coverage
- Network: Hit FM (Taiwan); RTHK; East Radio Pop; Radio Guangdong; Beijing Music Radio; Singapore Y.E.S. 93.3FM; Malaysia 988 FM

The Global Chinese Music Awards (abbreviated as GCMA) (Chinese: 全球华语歌曲排行榜颁奖典礼) is a music awards founded by seven Mandarin radio stations in 2001, including Hit FM, RTHK, East Radio Pop, Radio Guangdong, Beijing Yinyue Tai, Y.E.S. 93.3FM, and 988 FM.

== Ceremonies ==
Year	Venue	Location
2001	Capital Indoor Stadium	Beijing
2002	Tianhe Stadium	Guangzhou
2003	Shanghai Grand Stage	Shanghai
2004	National Taiwan University Sports Center	Taipei
2005	Putra Indoor Stadium	Kuala Lumpur
2006	Singapore Indoor Stadium	Singapore
2007	Hong Kong Coliseum	Hong Kong
2008	Radio Television Hong Kong	Hong Kong
2009	Beijing Exhibition Center	Beijing
2010	Radio Television Hong Kong	Hong Kong
2011	SMP Skatepark	Shanghai
2012	Singapore Indoor Stadium	Singapore
2013	Putra Indoor Stadium	Kuala Lumpur
2014	Guangdong Radio and Television	Guangzhou
2015	Suntec Singapore Convention and Exhibition Centre	Singapore
2016	Radio Television Hong Kong	Hong Kong
2017	988 FM	Malaysia
2018	Beijing Yinyue Tai	Beijing
2019	Beijing Yinyue Tai	Beijing

== Categories ==
- Most Popular Male Artiste
- Most Popular Female Artiste
- Best Male Artiste
- Best Female Artiste
- Media Recommendation
- Top Five Most Popular Male Artistes
- Top Five Most Popular Female Artistes
- Outstanding Regional Artiste (Beijing)
- Outstanding Regional Artiste (Guangdong)
- Outstanding Regional Artiste (Hong Kong)
- Outstanding Regional Artiste (Shanghai)
- Outstanding Regional Artiste (Taiwan)
- Outstanding Regional Artiste (Malaysia)
- Outstanding Regional Artiste (Singapore)
- Best Male Stage Performer
- Best Female Stage Performer
- Most Popular Composing Artiste
- Most Popular Group
- Most Popular Band
- Most Popular New Artiste
- Versatile Artiste
- Best Album
- Best Album Producer
- Best Lyricist
- Best Composer
- Best Arranger
- Most Popular Duet
- Top Twenty Hits
