= Chinese Music Awards =

The Chinese Music Awards (Chinese: 华语金曲奖) is a music awards founded in 2008 to recognize outstanding achievement in the Chinese music industry.

== Categories ==
- Top 10 Mandarin Albums
- Top 10 Cantonese Albums
- Top 10 Mandarin Songs
- Top 10 Cantonese Songs
- Best Mandarin Male Singer
- Best Mandarin Female Singer
- Best Cantonese Male Singer
- Best Cantonese Female Singer
- Best Mandarin New Male Artist
- Best Mandarin New Female Artist
- Best Cantonese New Male Artist
- Best Cantonese New Female Artist
- Best Band
- Best Group
- Best New Band
- Best New Group
- Best Ballad Artist
- Best World/Folk Music Artist
- Best Rock Artist
- Best Electronic Artist
- Best Jazz/Blues Artist
- Best Dance Artist
- Best Hip-Hop Artist
- Best Singer-Songwriter
- Best Original Soundtrack
- Best Compilation Album
- Best Mandarin Album
- Best Cantonese Album
- Best Hokkien Album
- Best Hakka Album
- Best Mandarin Song
- Best Cantonese Song
- Best Hokkien Song
- Best Hakka Song
- Artist of the Year
- Jury Award
