= Global Chinese Golden Chart Awards =

The Global Chinese Golden Chart Awards (simplified Chinese: 全球流行音乐金榜颁奖典礼; traditional Chinese: 全球流行音樂金榜頒獎典禮) is a music awards founded by China National Radio and Hit FM in 2009.

== Ceremonies ==
Year	Venue	Location
2011	Taipei Arena	Taipei
2012	Taipei Arena	Taipei
2013	The Centre in Vancouver for Performing Arts	Vancouver
2014	Putra Indoor Stadium	Kuala Lumpur
2015	Putra Indoor Stadium	Kuala Lumpur
2016	Workers Indoor Arena	Beijing
2017	LeSports Center	Beijing
2018	Workers Indoor Arena	Beijing
2019	Workers Indoor Arena	Beijing
2019	Capitol Theatre, Singapore	Singapore
2020	FUN MUSIC ASIA ENT.	Beijing

== Categories ==
- Best Album
- Most Popular Male Singer
- Most Popular Female Singer
- Best Male Singer
- Best Female Singer
- Most Popular Group
- Best Group
- Best Band
- Best Producer
- Most Popular New Artist
- Best New Artist (Gold)
- Best New Artist (Silver)
- Best New Artist (Copper)
- Best Stage Performance
- Best Singer-Songwriter
- Best Lyricist
- Best Composer
- Best Arranger
