= Chinese Top Ten Music Awards =

Annual Chinese music awards ceremony

The Chinese Top Ten Music Awards (Chinese: 东方风云榜音乐盛典) is a music awards founded by Shanghai Media Group and broadcast on Dragon Television in 1993 to honor the artists and works in the Mandopop music industry.

== History ==
Formerly known as ERS Chinese Top Ten, the award show was originated from the same title radio program created in 1992. ERS (East Radio Station) represents in Chinese as 东方广播电台 which was named by then Chinese Communist Party general secretary Jiang Zemin.

== Ceremonies ==
Year	Venue	Artist of the Year		Most Popular Artist	
Year	Venue	Male	Female	Male	Female
1994	Huangpu Gymnasium	—	—	Liu Huan	Ai Jing
1995	Shanghai Centre	—	—	Gao Linsheng	Na Ying
1996	Shanghai Indoor Stadium	—	—	Luo Zhongxu	Sun Yue
1997	Shanghai Indoor Stadium	—	—	Wang Ziming	Chen Ming
1998	Shanghai Indoor Stadium	—	—	Jin Xuefeng	Chen Ming
1999	Shanghai International Gymnastic Center	—	—	Wang Ziming	Na Ying
2000	Shanghai Gymnasium	—	—	Sun Nan	Na Ying
2001	Shanghai Gymnasium	—	—	Sun Nan	Na Ying
2002	Shanghai Gymnasium	—	—	Sun Nan	Tian Zhen
2003	Shanghai Gymnasium	—	—	Sun Nan	Han Hong
2004	Shanghai Gymnasium	—	—	Yang Kun	Han Hong
2005	Shanghai Grand Theatre	—	—	Hu Yanbin	Sun Yue
2006	Shanghai Gymnasium	—	—	Li Quan	Zhao Wei
2007	Shanghai Gymnasium	Hu Yanbin	Jin Haixin	—	—
2008	Shanghai Gymnasium	Wang Feng	Bibi Zhou	—	—
2009	Shanghai Gymnasium	Sun Nan	Jane Zhang	—	—
2010	Shanghai Gymnasium	Wang Feng	Jane Zhang	—	—
2011	Shanghai Gymnasium	Li Jian	Jane Zhang	—	—
2012	Mercedes-Benz Arena	Chen Chusheng	Chris Lee	—	—
2013 (20th Ceremony)	Mercedes-Benz Arena	Sun Nan	Jane Zhang	—	—
2014	Mercedes-Benz Arena	—	Bibi Zhou	—	—
2015	Mercedes-Benz Arena	Zhang Jie	Bibi Zhou	—	—
2016	Mercedes-Benz Arena	Zhang Jie	Bibi Zhou	—	—
2017	Mercedes-Benz Arena	Zhang Jie	Jane Zhang	Joker Xue	Bibi Zhou
2018	Mercedes-Benz Arena	Zhang Jie	Bibi Zhou	Zhang Yixing	Zhang Bichen
2019	Mercedes-Benz Arena	Zhang Jie	Bibi Zhou	Cai Xukun	Yuan Yawei
2020	Mercedes-Benz Arena	Cai Xukun	Bibi Zhou	Wang Yuan	Yuan Yawei
2021	Shanghai Oriental Sports Center	Zhang Yixing	Jane Zhang	Zhou Shen	Chris Lee
2022	Haikou Bay Meiyuan Wharf Plaza	Li Ronghao	Bibi Zhou	Zhou Shen	Liu Yuxin
2023 (30th Ceremony)	Mercedes-Benz Arena	Zhou Shen	Ivy Yu	Modern Brothers Liu Yuning	Bibi Zhou
2024	Mercedes-Benz Arena	Zhou Shen	Zhang Bichen	Wang Sulong	Shan Yichun

== Categories ==
- Best Album
- Best Male Singer
- Best Female Singer
- Most Popular Male Singer
- Most Popular Female Singer
- Best Lyrics
- Best Composition
- Most Influential Concert
- Best Singer-Songwriter
- Best New Artist
- Best Pop Collaboration
- Best Adapted Song
- Best Duet
- Best Film Original Song
- Best Crossover Artist
- Most Improved Artist
- Most Stylish Artist
- Most Breakthrough Artist
- Best Concept Album
- Media Recommend Singer
- Media Recommend Group
- Media Recommend Singer-Songwriter
- Media Recommend Album
- Most Popular Singer (Hong Kong)
- Most Popular Singer (Taiwan)
- Most Popular Singer (Singapore)
- Most Popular Singer (Malaysia)
- Best Asian Singer-Songwriter
- Most Outstanding Asian Band
- Most Popular Asian Singer
- Most Earthshaking Asian Singer
- Earthshaking Achievement Award
- Song of the Year
- Album of the Year
- Internet Influential Award
- People's Choice Male Singer
- People's Choice Female Singer
- People's Choice Group
- Top 10 Songs of the Year
