= Eric Chou discography =

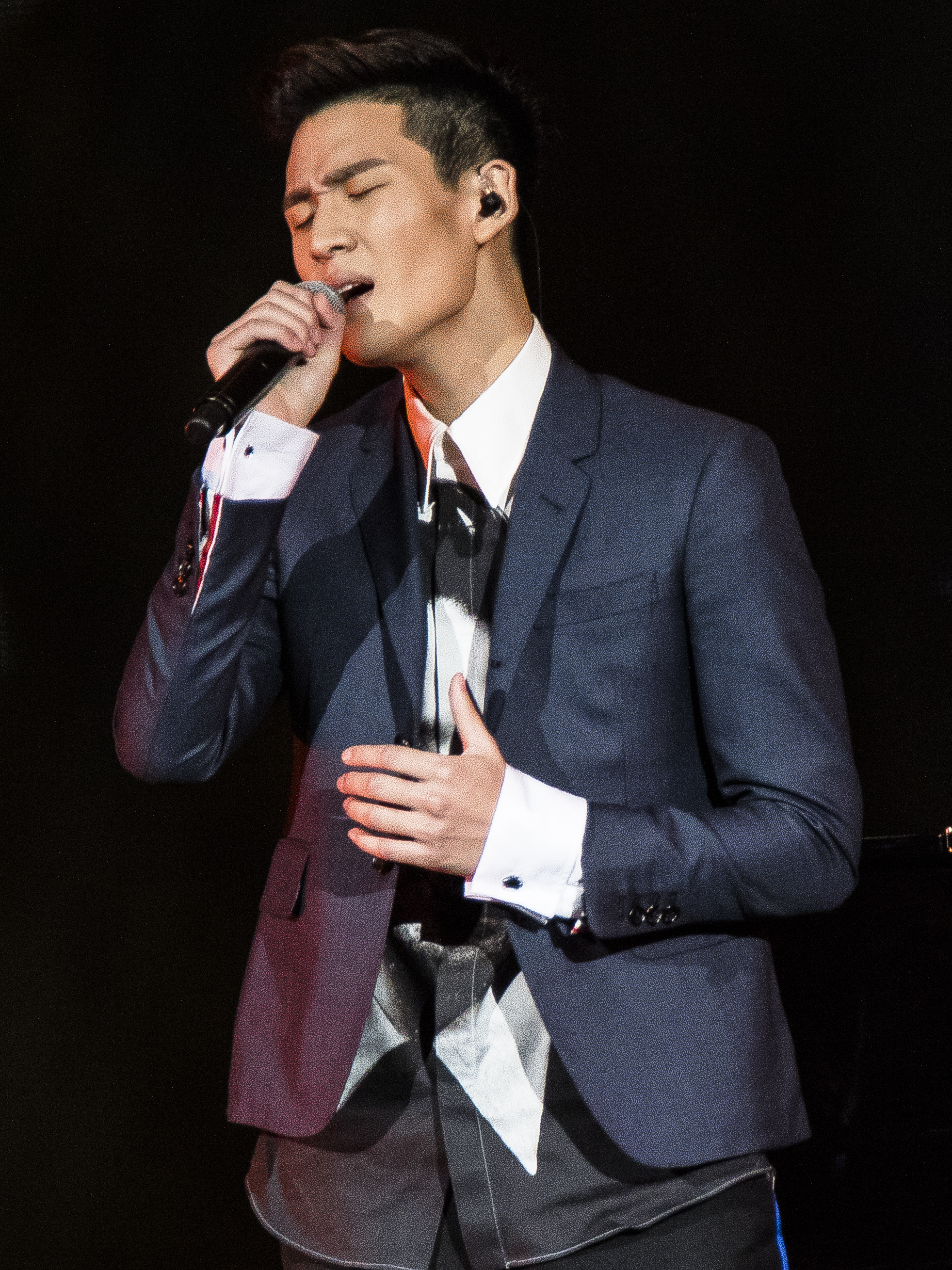
- Chou at the 2015 KKBox Music Awards
- Studio albums: 6
- EPs: 1
- Singles: 25
- Promotional singles: 4
- Soundtracks: 2

The discography of Taiwanese singer and songwriter Eric Chou consists of five studio albums, one extended play, twenty-four singles, and four promotional singles. Chou released his debut studio My Way to Love in December 2014, which produced the singles "The Distance of Love" and "My Way of Love". The record was certified platinum by the Recording Industry Association Singapore (RIAS). His sophomore record, What Love Has Taught Us, was released in August 2016 and spawned the hit "How Have You Been?", which was originally released in May 2016 as the ending theme for the Taiwanese TVBS drama Life List. His next album The Chaos After You was released in 2017.

In January 2019, Chou released his first extended play titled Freedom, which spawned the hit single "What's Wrong" as well as "Nobody But Me". A full album repackage of Freedom was made available in December of that year, which produced the singles "Forever Beautiful" and "Something About LA". The album was certified platinum in Singapore. Chou's fifth studio album, When We Were Young, was released in January 2020. His following album Almost was released in November 2024. It spawned the single "When You Missed Me".

== Albums ==
=== Studio albums ===
List of studio albums, showing selected details, sales figures, and certifications
Title	Album details	Peak chart positions	Sales	Certifications
Title	Album details	HK	Sales	Certifications
My Way to Love	Released: December 24, 2014; Label: Sony Music Taiwan; Formats: CD, digital download	—	SGP: 10,000 (Note: Sales figures are based on certification alone.)	RIAS: Platinum
What Love Has Taught Us	Released: August 5, 2016; Label: Sony Music Taiwan; Formats: CD, digital download	—		
The Chaos After You	Released: December 15, 2017; Label: Sony Music Taiwan; Formats: CD, digital download	—	SGP: 5,000	RIAS: Gold
Freedom	Released: December 24, 2019; Label: Sony Music Taiwan; Formats: CD, digital download	—	SGP: 10,000	RIAS: Platinum
When We Were Young	Released: January 7, 2020; Label: Sony Music Taiwan; Formats: CD, digital download; Track listing: 1. In the Works; 2. 時候的我們; 3. 受够; 4. Me and You; 5. That's Why I Like You; 6. Rollercoasters; 7. 相信愛; 8. That's All (Explicit); 9. Something About You; 10. 我很快樂; 11. 其實你並沒那麼孤單	9	SGP: 5,000	RIAS: Gold
Almost	Released: November 23, 2024; Label: M. Star Entertainment, Warner; Formats: CD, digital download	—		

== Extended plays ==
List of extended plays
	Album information
Freedom	Released: January 10, 2019; Label: Sony Music Entertainment Taiwan; Formats: CD, digital download; Track listing: 1. Old Days; 2. Nobody But Me; 3. 怎么了; 4. 至少我还记得; 5. Freedom

== Singles ==
=== As lead artist ===
List of singles, with year, selected chart positions, and album
Title	Year	Peak chart positions					Album
Title	Year	TWN	CHN	MLY Chin.	SGP	SGP Reg.	Album
"The Distance of Love" (以後別做朋友)	2014	—	—	—	—	8	My Way to Love
"My Way to Love" (學著愛) (with Rosie Yang)	2014	—	—	—	—	—	My Way to Love
"Zai Ai Ni" (再愛你)	2015	—	—	—	—	—	My Way to Love
"Back to the Day" (想回到那一天)	2016	—	—	—	—	—	What Love Has Taught Us
"How Have You Been?" (你, 好不好?)	2016	—	1	4	—	14	What Love Has Taught Us
"I Loved You" (我愛過你)	2016	—	—	—	—	—	Non-album single
"Let It Go"	2016	—	5	—	—	—	What Love Has Taught Us
"Unbreakable Love" (永不失聯的愛)	2017	—	—	4	—	—	Non-album single
"Happiness at Once" (快樂一次擁有)	2017	—	—	—	—	—	The Chaos After You
"Without Her"	2017	—	—	—	—	—	The Chaos After You
"The Chaos After You" (如果雨之後)	2017	—	—	9	29	5	The Chaos After You
"Nobody But Me"	2018	—	—	—	—	—	Freedom
"What's Wrong" (怎麼了)	2019	14	12	2	5	1	Freedom
"Something About LA"	2019	—	—	—	—	—	Freedom
"Forever Beautiful" (一樣美麗)	2019	—	96	—	—	18	Freedom
"Fortunate" (如果能幸福)	2020	—	—	—	—	18	Non-album singles
"When You Loved Me" (愛我的時候) (with Shan Yichun)	2021	—	17	—	—	16	Non-album singles
"Leaving You" (離開你以後)	2021	—	39	—	15	3	Non-album singles
"You Don't Belong to Me" (你不屬於我)	2021	6	85	8	14	5	Non-album singles
"What's On Your Mind" (想知道你在想什麼)	2022	3	—	8	13	4	Non-album singles
"14 Days"	2022	—	—	—	—	—	Non-album singles
"Graduation" (最後一堂課) (Theme to Mom, Don't Do That)	2022	13	—	7	16	6	Non-album singles
"Best Friend" (摯友)	2023	10	25	1	—	—	Non-album singles
"No Place Like You" (不喜歡沒有你的地方)	2023	—	—	—	—	—	Non-album singles
"That Night in Paris" (巴黎的夜晚走走)	2024	—	—	—	—	—	Almost
"When You Missed Me" (想念你想我)	2024	11	97	3	—	15	Almost
"—" denotes releases that did not chart, chart did not exist, or was not released in that region.

=== Promotional singles ===
Title	Year	Notes
"I Love You" (我爱过你)	2016	
"Give It a Home" (给它一个家) (with various artists)	2016	
"Unbreakable Love" (爱在身边)	2017	Theme song of LG V20 micro-movie "Love Is With You"
"Nobody But Me" (LOL Music Festival Special Edition)	2019	League of Legends E-Sports concert promotional release

=== As featured artist ===
Title	Year	Peak chart positions	Album
Title	Year	CHN	Album
"Don't Force It" (別勉強) (G.E.M. featuring Eric Chou)	2019	84	City Zoo

== Soundtrack appearances ==
Title	Year	Peak chart positions	Album
Title	Year	CHN	Album
"Don't Be Friends From Now On" (以後别做朋友)	2014	—	The Way We Were OST
"Youth" (青春要用几行诗来写)	2024	65	Follow Your Heart OST
