= List of Eric Chou concert tours =

Eric Chou concert tours
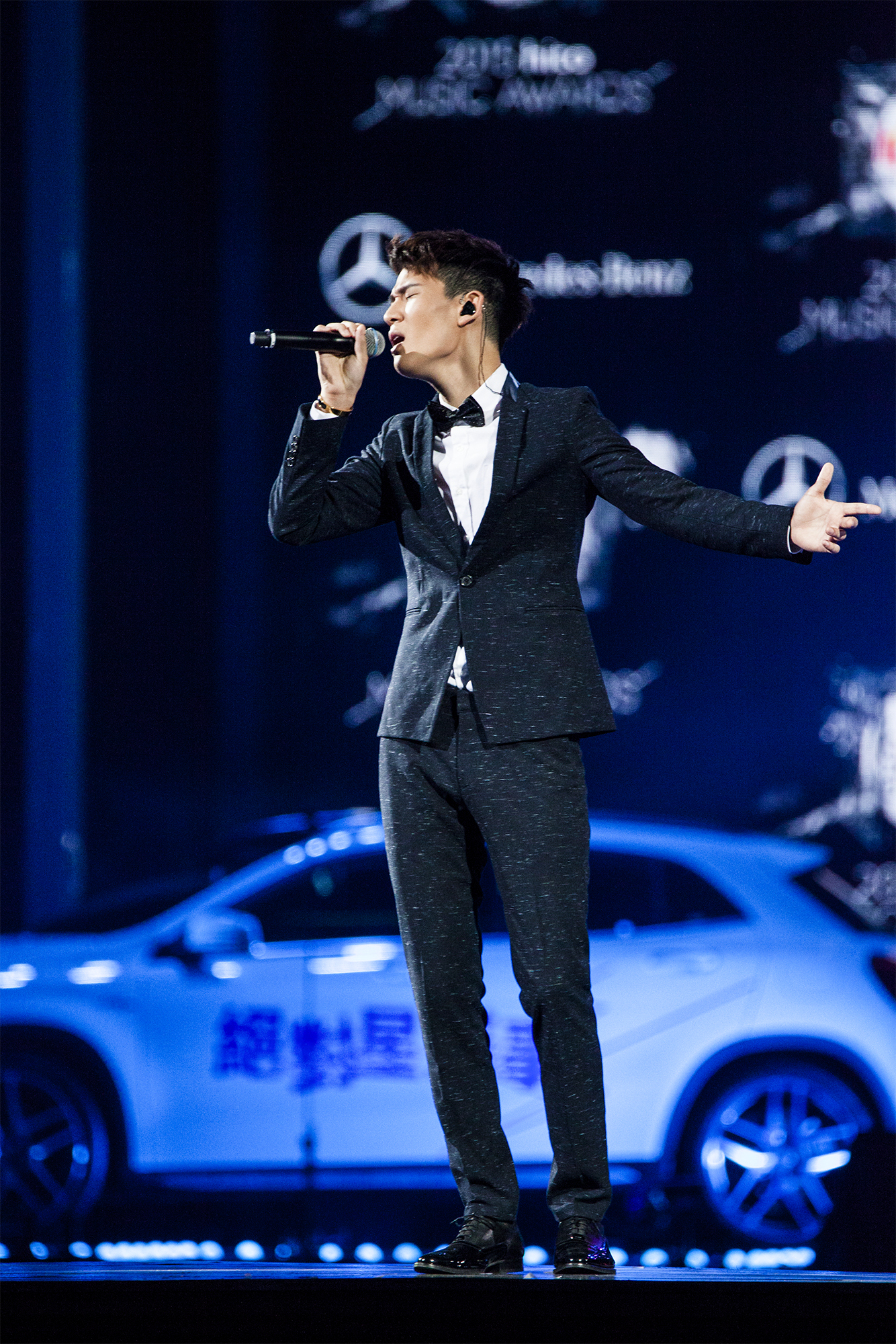
- Chou in 2015
- Concert tours: 4

Taiwanese singer and songwriter Eric Chou has embarked on four concert tours, with the first being the This is Love Tour in 2016. The tour spanned eight shows across Asia. This was followed by the 22 Twenty Two Tour in 2017, which spanned five shows in Taiwan, Singapore, Hong Kong, and Malaysia.

Chou embarked on the How Have You Been Tour in 2019. In August and September 2020, following the COVID-19 pandemic, all 42,000 tickets across four of his concerts in Taipei and Kaohsiung were sold out 15 minutes.

In 2022, Chou embarked on his first worldwide tour, titled the Odyssey Journey World Tour, traveling across Asia, North America, and Oceania fora total of 48 shows. It began with two performances at the Singapore Indoor Stadium that utilized a 360-degree floor plan, which attracted a total of 20,000 people. All 33,000 tickets for the three shows at the Taipei Arena were sold out quickly.

== Concert tours ==
| Title | Date(s) | Associated album(s) | Continent(s) | Shows |
|---|---|---|---|---|
| This is Love Tour | October 15, 2016 – October 14, 2017 | What Love Has Taught Us | Asia | 8 |
| 22 Twenty Two Tour | November 17, 2017 – September 1, 2018 | The Chaos After You | Asia | 5 |
| How Have You Been Tour | May 11, 2019 – September 6, 2020 | Freedom; When We Were Young | Asia | 9 |
| Odyssey Journey World Tour | September 10, 2022 – October 25, 2026 | Almost | Asia; Oceania; North America | 74 |

== This is Love Tour ==
List of concert dates
| Date | City | Country | Venue |
|---|---|---|---|
| October 15, 2016 | Singapore | | Shanghai Dolly |
| November 6, 2016 | Taipei | Taiwan | Legacy Concert |
| December 4, 2016 | Kuala Lumpur | Malaysia | KL Live |
| February 11, 2017 | Macau | | Studio City Arena |
| February 12, 2017 | Tanjong Bungah | Malaysia | Life Centre |
| March 18, 2017 | Singapore | | Downtown East D'Marquee |
| May 21, 2017 | Taipei | Taiwan | Legacy Concert |
| May 27, 2017 | Genting Highlands | Malaysia | Arena of Stars |
| October 14, 2017 | George Town | Malaysia | SPICE Arena |

== 22 Twenty Two Tour ==
List of concert dates
| Date | City | Country | Venue |
|---|---|---|---|
| November 17, 2017 | Taipei | Taiwan | Taipei International Convention Center |
| November 18, 2017 | Taipei | Taiwan | Taipei International Convention Center |
| June 9, 2018 | Singapore | | Singapore Expo |
| July 25, 2018 | Hong Kong | | Kowloonbay Int'l Trade & Exhibition Centre |
| September 1, 2018 | Kuala Lumpur | Malaysia | Axiata Arena |

== How Have You Been Tour ==
List of concert dates
| Date | City | Country | Venue | Attendance |
|---|---|---|---|---|
| May 11, 2019 | Taipei | Taiwan | Taipei Arena | — |
| August 24, 2019 | Kaohsiung | Taiwan | Kaohsiung Arena | — |
| August 25, 2019 | Kaohsiung | Taiwan | Kaohsiung Arena | — |
| December 13, 2019 | Singapore | | Singapore Indoor Stadium | — |
| December 14, 2019 | Singapore | | Singapore Indoor Stadium | — |
| August 8, 2020 | Taipei | Taiwan | Taipei Arena | 42,000 |
| August 9, 2020 | Taipei | Taiwan | Taipei Arena | 42,000 |
| September 5, 2020 | Kaohsiung | Taiwan | Kaohsiung Arena | 42,000 |
| September 6, 2020 | Kaohsiung | Taiwan | Kaohsiung Arena | 42,000 |
| Total | | | | N/A |

== Odyssey Journey World Tour ==
List of concert dates
| Date | City | Country | Venue | Attendance |
|---|---|---|---|---|
| September 10, 2022 | Singapore | | Singapore Indoor Stadium | 20,000 |
| September 11, 2022 | Singapore | | Singapore Indoor Stadium | 20,000 |
| October 21, 2022 | Taipei | Taiwan | Taipei Arena | 33,000 |
| October 22, 2022 | Taipei | Taiwan | Taipei Arena | 33,000 |
| October 23, 2022 | Taipei | Taiwan | Taipei Arena | 33,000 |
| November 5, 2022 | Los Angeles | United States | Pasadena Civic Auditorium | — |
| November 6, 2022 | San Jose | United States | San Jose Civic | — |
| November 9, 2022 | Vancouver | Canada | Queen Elizabeth Theater | — |
| November 11, 2022 | Toronto | Canada | Meridian Hall | — |
| February 25, 2023 | Hong Kong | | Hong Kong Coliseum | — |
| February 26, 2023 | Hong Kong | | Hong Kong Coliseum | — |
| April 1, 2023 | Atlantic City | United States | Hard Rock Live | — |
| May 19, 2023 | Sydney | Australia | Qudos Bank Arena | — |
| May 21, 2023 | Melbourne | Australia | Rod Laver Arena | — |
| June 2, 2023 | Kuala Lumpur | Malaysia | Axiata Arena | — |
| June 3, 2023 | Kuala Lumpur | Malaysia | Axiata Arena | — |
| June 4, 2023 | Kuala Lumpur | Malaysia | Axiata Arena | — |
| October 20, 2023 | Shanghai | China | Mercedes-Benz Arena | 24,000 |
| October 21, 2023 | Shanghai | China | Mercedes-Benz Arena | 24,000 |
| November 4, 2023 | Singapore | | Singapore Indoor Stadium | 20,000 |
| November 5, 2023 | Singapore | | Singapore Indoor Stadium | 20,000 |
| March 15, 2024 | Macau | | Galaxy Arena | 30,000 |
| March 16, 2024 | Macau | | Galaxy Arena | 30,000 |
| March 30, 2024 | Shenzhen | China | Shenzhen Bay Sports Center Gymnasium | — |
| March 31, 2024 | Shenzhen | China | Shenzhen Bay Sports Center Gymnasium | — |
| April 6, 2024 | Chongqing | China | Huaxi Cultural and Sports Center | — |
| April 27, 2024 | Nanjing | China | Nanjing Olympic Sports Center Gymnasium | — |
| May 18, 2024 | Guangzhou | China | Baoneng Performing Arts Center | — |
| May 19, 2024 | Guangzhou | China | Baoneng Performing Arts Center | — |
| May 25, 2024 | Ningbo | China | Ningbo Olympic Sports Center Gymnasium | — |
| June 1, 2024 | Tianjin | China | Tianjin Olympic Centre Gymnasium | — |
| June 8, 2024 | Suzhou | China | Suzhou Olympic Sports Center Gymnasium | — |
| June 8, 2024 | Suzhou | China | Suzhou Olympic Sports Center Gymnasium | — |
| July 13, 2024 | Chengdu | China | Dong'an Lake Sports Park Gymnasium | — |
| July 27, 2024 | Jakarta | Indonesia | Sentul International Convention Center | 10,000 |
| August 9, 2024 | Shanghai | China | Mercedes-Benz Arena | 20,000 |
| August 10, 2024 | Shanghai | China | Mercedes-Benz Arena | 20,000 |
| August 24, 2024 | Beijing | China | Wukesong Arena | — |
| September 15, 2024 | Foshan | China | GBA Center | — |
| September 21, 2024 | Hefei | China | Hefei Shaoquan Sports Center Gymnasium | — |
| November 8, 2024 | Melbourne | Australia | John Cain Arena | — |
| November 10, 2024 | Sydney | Australia | Qudos Bank Arena | — |
| November 23, 2024 | Hangzhou | China | Hangzhou Olympic Sports Center Gymnasium | — |
| November 24, 2024 | Hangzhou | China | Hangzhou Olympic Sports Center Gymnasium | — |
| November 30, 2024 | Kuala Lumpur | Malaysia | Axiata Arena | — |
| December 1, 2024 | Kuala Lumpur | Malaysia | Axiata Arena | — |
| December 14, 2024 | Wuhan | China | Optics Valley International Tennis Center | — |
| March 29, 2025 | Xiamen | China | Xiamen Olympic Sports Center Gymnasium | — |
| June 1, 2025 | Taiyuan | China | Shanxi Sports Centre Gymnasium | — |
| June 14, 2025 | Shenzhen | China | Shenzhen Bay Sports Center Gymnasium | — |
| June 15, 2025 | Shenzhen | China | Shenzhen Bay Sports Center Gymnasium | — |
| August 2, 2025 | Changsha | China | Hunan International Convention and Exhibition Center | — |
| August 23, 2025 | Quanzhou | China | Jinjiang Second Sports Center Gymnasium | — |
| September 19, 2025 | Hong Kong | | Hong Kong Coliseum | — |
| September 20, 2025 | Hong Kong | | Hong Kong Coliseum | — |
| September 21, 2025 | Hong Kong | | Hong Kong Coliseum | — |
| September 26, 2025 | Taipei | Taiwan | Taipei Arena | — |
| September 27, 2025 | Taipei | Taiwan | Taipei Arena | — |
| September 28, 2025 | Taipei | Taiwan | Taipei Arena | — |
| October 18, 2025 | Shanghai | China | Hongkou Football Stadium | — |
| November 22, 2025 | Chengdu | China | Wuliangye Cultural and Sports Center | — |
| November 29, 2025 | Nanchang | China | Nanchang International Sports Center Gymnasium | — |
| December 6, 2025 | Xi'an | China | Xi'an Olympic Sports Center Gymnasium | — |
| March 14, 2026 | Guangzhou | China | Guangzhou University Town Sports Center Stadium | — |
| April 11, 2026 | Singapore | | Singapore Indoor Stadium | — |
| April 12, 2026 | Singapore | | Singapore Indoor Stadium | — |
| May 9, 2026 | Jakarta | Indonesia | Indonesia Arena | — |
| June 14, 2026 | Shenzhen | China | Shenzhen Sports Center Stadium | — |
| June 15, 2026 | Shenzhen | China | Shenzhen Sports Center Stadium | — |
| July 5, 2026 | Chongqing | China | Bloomage Biotech & Runbaiyan ECM Center | — |
| August 1, 2026 | Shanghai | China | Shanghai Hongkou Football Stadium | — |
| August 2, 2026 | Shanghai | China | Shanghai Hongkou Football Stadium | — |
| September 5, 2026 | Changzhou | China | Changzhou Olympic Sports Centre | — |
| September 12, 2026 | Qingdao | China | Qingdao Citizens' Fitness Center Gymnasium | — |
| September 26, 2026 | Hangzhou | China | Huanglong Sports Center Stadium | — |
| October 24, 2026 | Kuala Lumpur | Malaysia | Unifi Arena | — |
| October 25, 2026 | Kuala Lumpur | Malaysia | Unifi Arena | — |
| November 8, 2026 | Melbourne | Australia | John Cain Arena | — |
| November 10, 2026 | Sydney | Australia | Qudos Bank Arena | — |
| November 14, 2026 | Ningbo | China | Ningbo Olympic Sports Center Gymnasium | — |
| December 12, 2026 | Beijing | China | Bloomage Biotech · Runbaiyan Center | — |
| Total | | | | N/A |
