= List of awards and nominations received by Gin Lee =

This is a list of awards and nominations received by Gin Lee, a Hong Kong–based singer. She debuted in Malaysia in 2009 and in Hong Kong in 2010 as a Cantopop solo artist under BMA Records with the EP Here I Come. In 2014 she signed with Universal Music Hong Kong and made her fourth Cantonese release with the album beGin. Singles from beGin achieved major commercial success, and the album was certified gold by the Hong Kong Recording Industry Alliance less than two months after its release, eventually reaching plantinum.

== AIM Chinese Music Awards ==
AIM Chinese Music Awards (Chinese: AIM中文音乐颁奖典礼) is hosted by the Malaysian Recording Industry Association.

| Year | Nominee/Work | Category | Result | Ref. |
|---|---|---|---|---|
| 2020 | Gin Lee/beGin | Best Female Singer | Won | |

== Cantonese Song Chart Awards Presentation ==
The Cantonese Song Chart Awards Presentation (Chinese: 粵語歌曲排行榜頒獎典禮) is hosted by the Music FM Radio Guangdong 廣東廣播電視台音樂之聲FM93.9 since 2014.

| Bout | Year | Nominee/ Work | Category | Result | Ref. |
|---|---|---|---|---|---|
| 3rd | 2016 | "Shuang Shuan" | Most Popular Song | Won | |
| 3rd | 2016 | "Unique" 獨一無二 (with AGA) | Most Popular Duet | Won | |
| 4th | 2017 | "Saying Goodbye to Everyday" | Most Popular Song | Won | |
| 4th | 2017 | Live in the Moment | Most Popular Album | Won | |

== Chinese Golden Melody Awards ==
(Chinese: 华语金曲奖). Not to be confused with the Taiwan-based Golden Melody Awards.

| Bout | Year | Nominee/ Work | Category | Result | Ref. |
|---|---|---|---|---|---|
| 9th | 2017 | Gin Lee | Female Cantonese Singer of the Year | Won | |
| 9th | 2017 | beGin | Top 10 Cantonese Album | Won | |
| 9th | 2017 | " Under the Moon" | Top 10 Cantonese Song | Won | |

== Global Chinese Music Awards ==
The Global Chinese Music Awards (Chinese: 全球华语歌曲排行榜颁奖典礼) is founded by seven Mandarin radio stations in 2001, including Hit FM, RTHK, East Radio Pop, Radio Guangdong, Beijing Yinyue Tai, YES 933, and 988 FM.

| Bout | Year | Nominee/ Work | Category | Result | Ref. |
|---|---|---|---|---|---|
| 13th | 2013 | Gin Lee | Best Performance Artiste of Malaysia | Won | |
| 13th | 2013 | "Returning Home Alone Today" | Top 20 Most Popular Song | Won | |
| 17th | 2017 | Gin Lee | Outstanding Regional Artiste (Malaysia) | Nominated | |

== Metro Radio Hit Music Awards ==
The Metro Radio Hit Music Awards (Chinese: 新城勁爆頒獎禮) is presented annually by Metro Broadcast Radio Station.

| Year | Nominee/ Work | Category | Result | Ref. |
|---|---|---|---|---|
| 2011 | Gin Lee | Newcomer Award (Overseas) | Won | |
| 2012 | Gin Lee | Hit Popular Singer | Won | |
| 2012 | "Returning Home Alone Today" 今天終於一人回家 | Hit New Media Song | Won | |
| 2013 | "Story of Rose" 玫瑰的故事 | Hit Karaoke Song | Won | |
| 2013 | Gin Lee | Hit Performance | Won | |
| 2016 | Gin Lee | Hit Female Singer | Gold prize | |
| 2016 | "Unique" 獨一無二 (with AGA) | Best Song | Won | |
| 2016 | "Unique" 獨一無二 (with AGA) | Best Duet | Won | |
| 2016 | "Shuang Shuan" 雙雙 | Best Song | Won | |
| 2018 | Gin Lee | Hit Female Singer | Won | |
| 2018 | "Self Awareness" 自我感覺還好 | Best Song | Won | |
| 2019 | Gin Lee | Hit Mandarin Singer | Won | |
| 2019 | Ukiyo-e 浮世繪 | Hit Mandarin Album | Won | |

== RTHK Top 10 Gold Songs Awards ==
RTHK Top 10 Gold Songs Awards is held annually in Hong Kong since 1978. The awards are determined by Radio and Television Hong Kong based on the work of all Asian artists (mostly cantopop) for the previous year.

| Bout | Year | Nominee/ Work | Category | Result | Ref. |
|---|---|---|---|---|---|
| 34th | 2011 | Gin Lee | Best Prospect Award | Won | |
| 35th | 2012 | Gin Lee | Most Improved | Gold prize | |
| 39th | 2016 | "Unique" (with AGA) | Top 10 Song | Won | |
| 40th | 2017 | "Flight Attendant" | Top 10 Song | Won | |
| 40th | 2017 | Gin Lee | Excellent Pop Singer | Won | |
| 41st | 2018 | Gin Lee | Excellent Pop Singer | Won | |
| 41st | 2018 | "Fortitude" | Top 10 Song | Won | |

== Ultimate Song Chart Awards ==
The Ultimate Song Chart Awards Presentation (Chinese: 叱咤樂壇流行榜頒獎典禮) is a cantopop award ceremony hosted by Commercial Radio Hong Kong known as Ultimate 903 (FM 90.3).

| Year | Nominee/ Work | Category | Result | Ref. |
|---|---|---|---|---|
| 2016 | Gin Lee | Best Female Singer | silver | |
| 2016 | "Unique" (with AGA) | My Favourite Song | Top 20 | |
| 2017 | Gin Lee | My Favourite Female Singer | Nominated | |
| 2017 | "Saying Goodbye to Everyday" | My Favourite Song | Top 20 | |
| 2017 | Gin Lee | Best Female Singer | silver | |
| 2017 | "Saying Goodbye to Everyday" | Top 10 Song | Won | |
| 2018 | Gin Lee | Best Female Singer | silver | |
| 2023 | "Dum Dum" | Top 10 Song | Won | |
| 2023 | Gin Lee | Best Female Singer | silver | |

== Yahoo! Asia Buzz Awards ==
| Year | Nominee/ Work | Category | Result | Ref. |
|---|---|---|---|---|
| 2011 | Gin Lee | Newcomer | Won | |
| 2012 | "Falling" | Hit Song | Won | |
| 2013 | "Story of Rose" | Hit Song | Won | |
| 2014 | "One Plus One" 一加一 (with AGA) | Top Duet | Won | |
