= List of Global Chinese Pop Chart number-one songs of 2018 =

This is a list of the songs that topped the Global Chinese Pop Chart in 2018.

The Global Chinese Pop Chart (全球华语歌曲排行榜) is a weekly Chinese language pop music chart compiled by 7 Chinese language radio stations across Asia: Beijing Music Radio, Shanghai Eastern Broadcasting (zh), Radio Guangdong, Radio Television Hong Kong, Taipei Pop Radio, Singapore's Y.E.S. 93.3FM and Malaysia's 988 FM. The chart's definition of "Chinese language" covers all three main genres of C-pop: Mandopop, Cantopop and Hokkien pop.

== Chart history ==
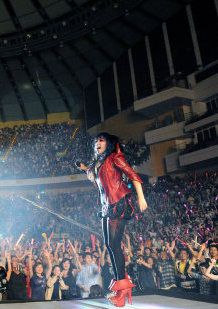
Taiwanese singer A-mei (pictured) has earned two number-one songs throughout the year.

Issue date	Song	Artist(s)	Ref.
January 5	"STORY THIEF (偷故事的人)"	A-mei	
January 12	"Wei da de miao xiao (偉大的渺小)"	JJ Lin	
January 19	"Wei da de miao xiao (偉大的渺小)"	JJ Lin	
January 26	"Full Name (連名帶姓)"	A-mei	
February 2	"Full Name (連名帶姓)"	A-mei	
February 9	"On Happiness Road (幸福路上)"	Jolin Tsai	
February 16	"Wei da de miao xiao (偉大的渺小)"	JJ Lin	
February 23	"Full Name (連名帶姓)"	A-mei	
March 2	"Feng Yi (風衣)"	Stefanie Sun	
March 9	"Waiting For You (等你下課)"	Jay Chou & Gary Yang	
March 16	"The Chaos After You (如果雨之後)"	Eric Chou	
March 23	"What A Song (什麼歌)"	Mayday	
March 30	"What A Song (什麼歌)"	Mayday	
April 6	"What A Song (什麼歌)"	Mayday	
April 13	"Yin yin zuo xiu (隱隱作秀)"	Zhang Bichen	
April 20	"Ru ge (如歌)"	Zhang Jie	
April 27	"Ru ge (如歌)"	Zhang Jie	
May 4	"Ru ge (如歌)"	Zhang Jie	
May 11	"Sui yue" (歲月)	Faye Wong & Na Ying	
May 18	"Ru ge (如歌)"	Zhang Jie	
May 25	"Us (我們)"	Eason Chan	
June 1	"Màn man xǐhuān nǐ (慢慢喜歡你)"	Karen Mok	
June 8	"Màn man xǐhuān nǐ (慢慢喜歡你)"	Karen Mok	
June 15	"Màn man xǐhuān nǐ (慢慢喜歡你)"	Karen Mok	
June 22	"Under the Cloud (飛雲之下)"	Han Hong ft. JJ Lin	
June 29	"Under the Cloud (飛雲之下)"	Han Hong ft. JJ Lin	
July 6	"Under the Cloud (飛雲之下)"	Han Hong ft. JJ Lin	
July 13	"Under the Cloud (飛雲之下)"	Han Hong ft. JJ Lin	
July 20	"Don't Speak (別廢話)"	Tia Ray	
July 27	"Don't Speak (別廢話)"	Tia Ray	
August 3	"Don't Speak (別廢話)"	Tia Ray	
August 10	"Don't Speak (別廢話)"	Tia Ray	
August 17	"Am I Me (漸漸)"	Eason Chan	
August 24	"Am I Me (漸漸)"	Eason Chan	
August 31	"Quarrelsome Lovers (王牌冤家)"	Li Ronghao	
September 7	"Am I Me (漸漸)"	Eason Chan	
September 14	"TIK TOK (倒數)"	G.E.M.	
September 21	"Super Life (一路之下)"	Jason Zhang	
September 28	"Zuì hǎo dì nà nián (最好的那年)"	TFBOYS	
October 5	"Hán yā shàonián (寒鴉少年)"	Hua Chenyu	
October 12	"Xǐhuān nǐ (喜歡你)"	TFBOYS	
October 19	"Hold Me Down"	Kris Wu	
October 26	"If I Were Young (年少有爲)"	Li Ronghao	
November 2	"Ke yi ke zai (可一可再)"	Eason Chan	
November 9	"Ke yi ke zai (可一可再)"	Eason Chan	
November 16	"Shíjiān tíngle (時間停了)"	Lu Han	
November 23	"Shíjiān tíngle (時間停了)"	Lu Han	
November 30	"Shíjiān tíngle (時間停了)"	Lu Han	
December 7	"Mèng bù luò yǔlín (夢不落雨林)"	Lay Zhang	
December 14	"Ear (耳朵)"	Li Ronghao	
December 21	"Mèng bù luò yǔlín (夢不落雨林)"	Lay Zhang	
December 28	"Mèng bù luò yǔlín (夢不落雨林)"	Lay Zhang	
