= List of Global Chinese Pop Chart number-one songs of 2017 =

This is a list of the songs that topped the Global Chinese Pop Chart in 2017.

The Global Chinese Pop Chart (全球华语歌曲排行榜) is a weekly Chinese language pop music chart compiled by 7 Chinese language radio stations across Asia: Beijing Music Radio, Shanghai Eastern Broadcasting (zh), Radio Guangdong, Radio Television Hong Kong, Taipei Pop Radio, Singapore's Y.E.S. 93.3FM and Malaysia's 988 FM. The chart's definition of "Chinese language" covers all three main genres of C-pop: Mandopop, Cantopop and Hokkien pop.

== Chart history ==
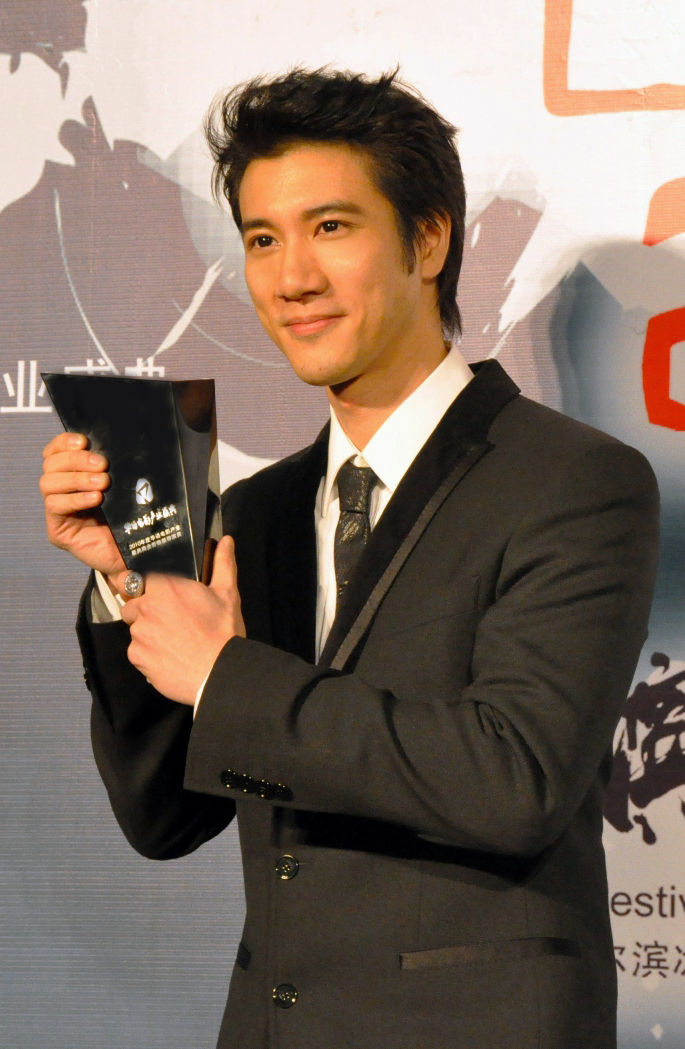
Taiwanese-American singer Wang Leehom (pictured) had three number-one songs throughout the year.

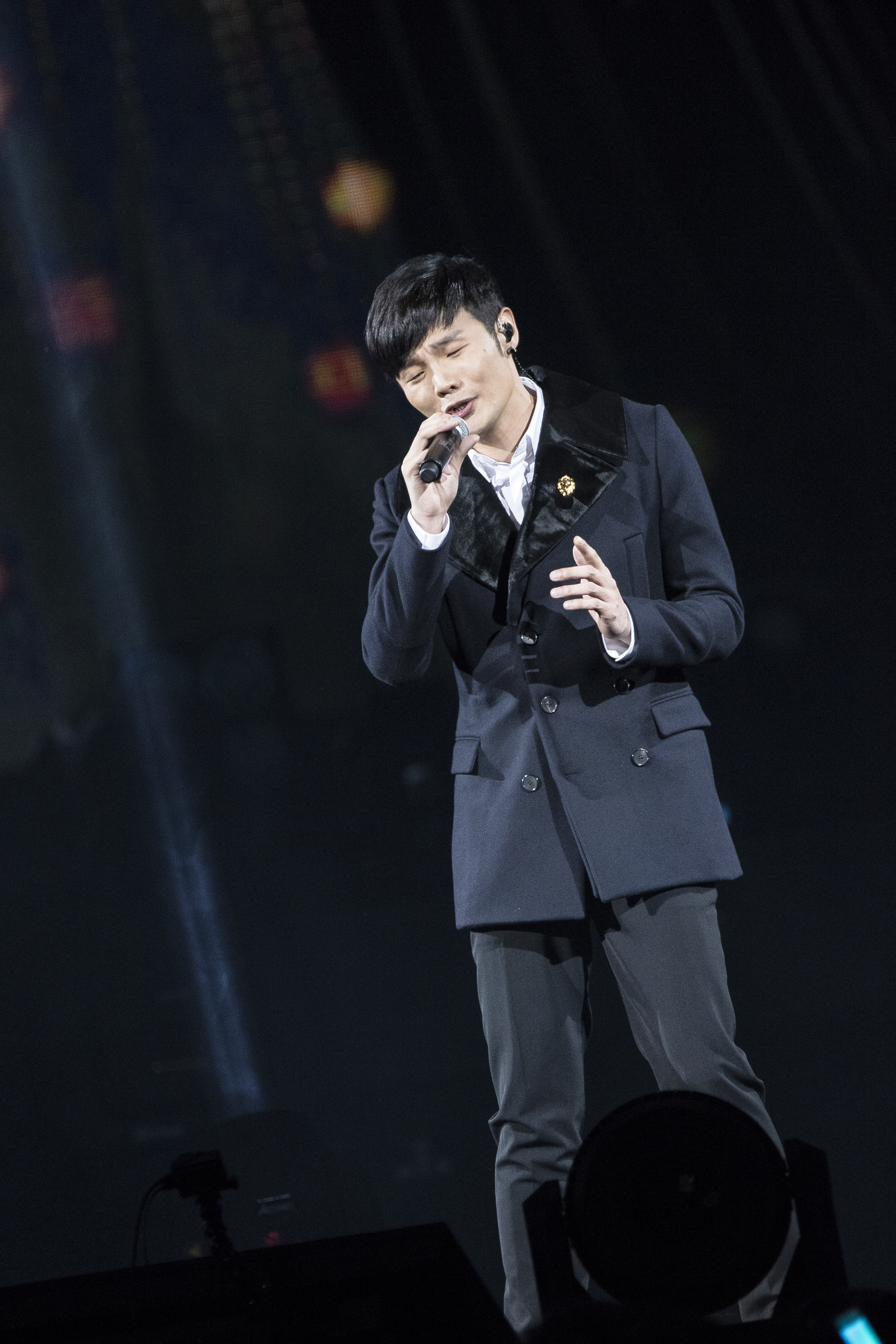
Chinese singer-songwriter Li Ronghao (pictured) earned three number-one songs throughout the year.

| Issue date | Song | Artist(s) | Ref. |
|---|---|---|---|
| January 6 | "Zhi shan shan lai chi de ni (致姍姍來遲的你)" | A Si & Yoga Lin | |
| January 13 | "Yuan fen yi dao qiao (緣分一道橋)" | Wang Leehom & Tan Weiwei | |
| January 20 | "Wu biao mian shang hen (無表面傷痕)" | Joyce Cheng | |
| January 27 | "Everything Will Say Goodbye" | Zhang Jie | |
| February 2 | "Di yi bai ge wo (第一百個我)" | Joey Yung | |
| February 10 | "I Do" | Eason Chan | |
| February 17 | "Hao hao (好好)" | Mayday | |
| February 24 | "Di yi bai ge wo (第一百個我)" | Joey Yung | |
| March 3 | "Wo jiu shi ai ni bu hai pa (我就是愛你不害怕)" | Sammi Cheng | |
| March 10 | "Huo xing ren lai guo (火星人來過)" | Joker Xue | |
| March 17 | "Light Years Away (光年之外)" | G.E.M. | |
| March 24 | "Tian bian di bian qing bu bian (天變地變情不變)" | Gin Lee | |
| March 31 | "C3PO" | Hacken Lee | |
| April 7 | "Tian bian di bian qing bu bian (天變地變情不變)" | Gin Lee | |
| April 14 | "San sheng san shi (三生三世)" | Zhang Jie | |
| April 21 | "18" | Coco Lee | |
| April 28 | "18" | Coco Lee | |
| May 5 | "Fan ren ge (凡人歌)" | Mayday ft. Jam Hsiao | |
| May 12 | "Piao xiang bei fang (漂向北方)" | Namewee ft. Wang Leehom | |
| May 19 | "Fan ren ge (凡人歌)" | Mayday ft. Jam Hsiao | |
| May 26 | "Animal World (動物世界)" | Joker Xue | |
| June 2 | "Dai zhe gu hui qu lv xing (帶著骨灰去旅行)" | Ken Hung | |
| June 9 | "Man man xi guan (慢慢習慣)" | Andy Lau | |
| June 16 | "Wo bu neng wang ji ni (我不能忘記你)" | Sandy Lam | |
| June 23 | "En (嗯)" | Li Ronghao | |
| June 30 | "En (嗯)" | Li Ronghao | |
| July 7 | "En (嗯)" | Li Ronghao | |
| July 14 | "En (嗯)" | Li Ronghao | |
| July 21 | "Pi feng (披風)" | Eason Chan | |
| July 28 | "Chu fa (觸發)" | Luhan | |
| August 4 | "Chu fa (觸發)" | Luhan | |
| August 11 | "Pi feng (披風)" | Eason Chan | |
| August 18 | "Coming Home" | Will Pan | |
| August 25 | "Coming Home" | Will Pan | |
| September 1 | "Coming Home" | Will Pan | |
| September 8 | "Yi bai zhong re ai (一百種熱愛)" | Chris Lee feat. Major Lazer | |
| September 15 | "Jiu zhe yang (就這樣)" | Li Ronghao | |
| September 22 | "Shui lai jian yue guang (誰來剪月光)" | Eason Chan | |
| September 29 | "Shui lai jian yue guang (誰來剪月光)" | Eason Chan | |
| October 6 | "Shui lai jian yue guang (誰來剪月光)" | Eason Chan | |
| October 13 | "Dan ning zhi zhuo (丹宁执着)" | JJ Lin | |
| October 20 | "Dan ning zhi zhuo (丹宁执着)" | JJ Lin | |
| October 27 | "Ge yao (歌謠)" | Li Ronghao | |
| November 3 | "I Do" | Karen Mok | |
| November 10 | "A.I. (愛)" | Wang Leehom | |
| November 17 | "A.I. (愛)" | Wang Leehom | |
| November 24 | "A.I. (愛)" | Wang Leehom | |
| December 1 | "A.I. (愛)" | Wang Leehom | |
| December 8 | "今天雨，可是我們在一起 (Happy Ever After)" | Chris Lee | |
| December 15 | "跳舞的梵穀 (A Dancing Van Gogh)" | Stefanie Sun | |
| December 22 | "跳舞的梵穀 (A Dancing Van Gogh)" | Stefanie Sun | |
| December 29 | "Wo Men De Shi Guang (我們的時光)" | TFBoys | |
