= Global Chinese Pop Chart =

Chinese language pop music chart

The Global Chinese Pop Chart (全球华语歌曲排行榜, quánqiú huáyŭ gēqŭ páihángbàng) is a Chinese language pop music chart compiled by 7 Chinese language radio stations across Asia. It was founded in 2001 by Beijing Music Radio, Shanghai Eastern Broadcasting (zh), Radio Guangdong, Radio Television Hong Kong, Hit Fm Taiwan, subsequently replaced by Taipei Pop Radio, and Malaysia's 988 FM.

The chart's definition of "Chinese language" covers all three main genres of C-pop: Mandopop, Cantopop and Hokkien pop.

== Number-one songs ==
- List of Global Chinese Pop Chart number-one songs of 2017
- List of Global Chinese Pop Chart number-one songs of 2018

== Awards ==
The awards and concert take place in the first week of September each year

- 2001 - Beijing Capital Indoor Stadium
- 2002 - Guangdong Tianhe Stadium
- 2003 - Shanghai Indoor Stadium
- 2004 - National Taiwan University Gymnasium
- 2005 - Kuala Lumpur's Putra Indoor Stadium
- 2006 - Singapore,
- 2007 - Hong Kong
- 2008 - Hong Kong
- 2009 - Beijing Exhibition Center
- 2010 - Hong Kong Coliseum
