= Gin Lee discography =

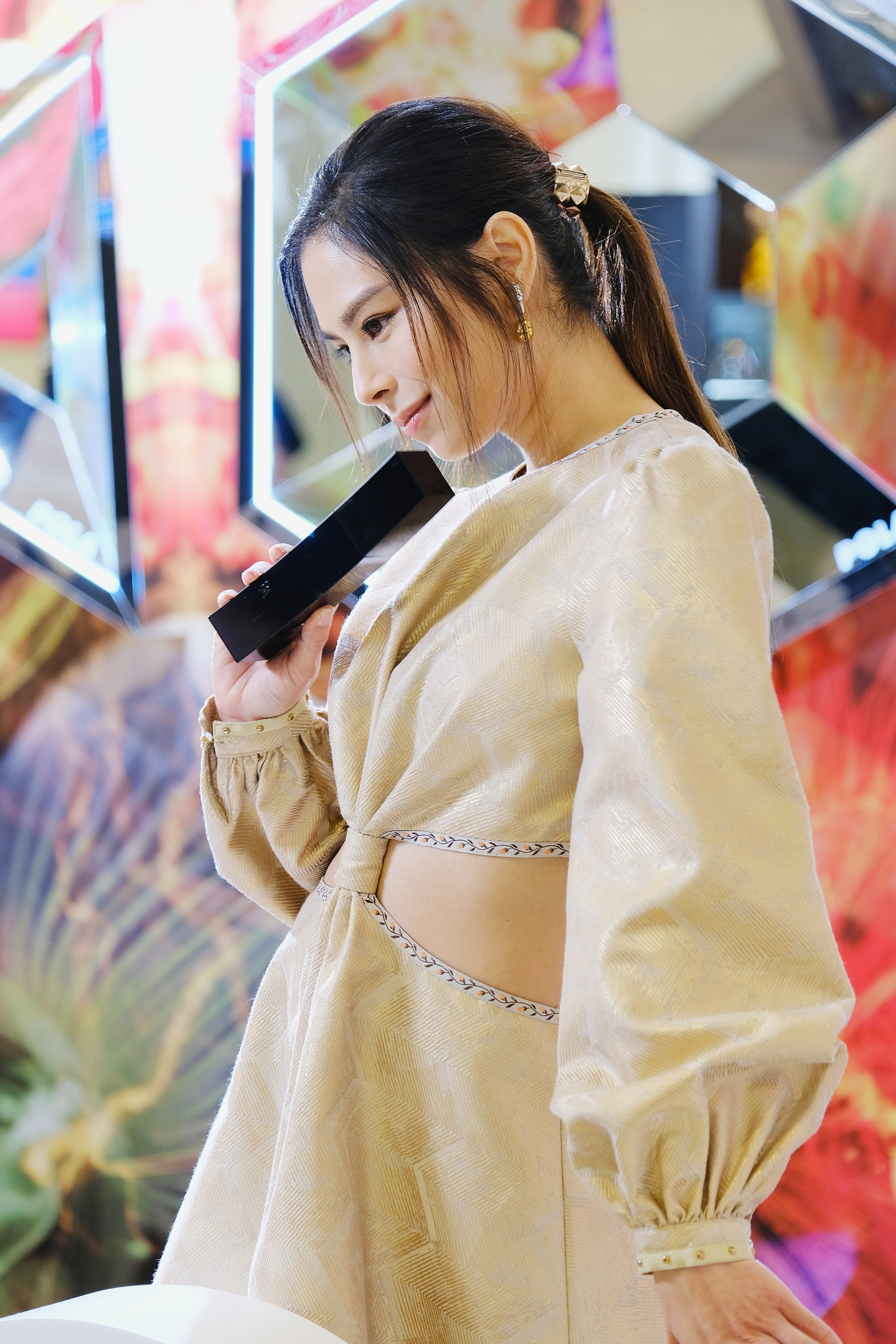
- Lee in 2021
- Studio albums: 7
- EPs: 5
- Live albums: 2
- Compilation albums: 1
- Singles: 32

Malaysian singer Gin Lee (Chinese: 李幸倪) has released eight studio albums, five EPs, two live albums, 32 singles, and made other appearances as a featured artist. Gin Lee made her Hong Kong debut in 2012 with the EP Here I Come.

== Albums ==
=== Studio albums ===
List of studio albums, with selected details and certifications
Title	Album details	Peak chart positions	Certifications
Title	Album details	HK	Certifications
One & Only	Released: 29 December 2009; Label: Fretlezz Production; Format: CD	—	
Gin Lee	Released: 30 July 2012; Label: BMA Records; Format: CD, digital download, streaming	9	
Begin	Released: 18 April 2016; Label: Universal Music Hong Kong; Format: CD+DVD, digital download, streaming, SACD	1	HKRIA: Platinum
Live in the Moment	Released: 8 September 2017; Label: Universal Music Hong Kong; Format: CD+DVD, digital download, streaming, SACD, Vinyl	1	HKRIA: Gold
Ukiyo-e (浮世繪)	Released: 19 July 2019; Label: Universal Music Hong Kong; Format: 2CD, digital download, streaming, SACD, Vinyl	1	
Dear Secret	Released: 20 November 2020; Label: Universal Music Hong Kong; Format: CD+DVD, digital download, streaming	1	
Time & Faith	Released: 8 July 2022; Label: Universal Music Hong Kong; Format: CD+DVD, digital download, streaming	2	
Leap of faith	Released: 22 February 2025; Label: Emperor Entertainment Group; Format: CD, digital download, streaming		

=== Live albums ===
Title	Album details
Begin and More	Released: 25 November 2016; Label: Universal Music Hong Kong; Format: CD
First of All Live 2018	Released: 19 October 2018; Label: Universal Music Hong Kong; Format: 2 Blu-ray + 3CD

=== Compilation albums ===
Title	Album details	Peak chart positions
Title	Album details	HK
Prologue	Released: 20 March 2018; Label: Universal Music Hong Kong; Formats: CD + DVD, Vinyl	1

== Extended plays ==
Title	Details	Peak chart positions
Title	Details	HK
Here I Come	Released: 27 October 2011; Label: BMA Records; Format: CD, digital download	—
Ginetic	Released: 13 November 2013; Label: BMA Records; Format: CD+DVD, digital download	9
信	Released: 7 June 2018; Label: Universal Music Hong Kong; Format: Digital download	—
Bold & Beautiful	Released: 21 June 2018; Label: Universal Music Hong Kong; Format: CD, Digital download, Vinyl	1
Gin Lee Music Suite	Released: 14 December 2018; Label: Universal Music Hong Kong; Format: Digital download	—

== Singles ==
=== As main artist ===
List of singles, with selected chart positions, showing year released and album name
Title	Year	Album	Notes
"Don't Speak Nonsense" (廢話少說)	2011	Here I Come	
"Diving" (潛水)	2011	Here I Come	
"Falling"	2012	Gin Lee	
"1st Date"	2012	Gin Lee	
"Returning Home Alone Today" (今天終於一人回家)	2012	Gin Lee	
"GT"	2012	Gin Lee	
"I'm Not Your Ornamental Fish" (我不是你的觀賞魚)	2012	Ginetic	
"You're The Only One I Like" (偏偏喜歡你)	2013	Ginetic	
"Story of Rose" (玫瑰的故事)	2013	Ginetic	
"I Say" (我說)	2013	Ginetic	
"Pairs" (雙雙)	2016	Begin	
"Man under the Moon" (月球下的人)	2016	Begin	
"Halo" (光環)	2016	Begin	
"Abracadabra, Open the Door" (芝麻開門)	2016	Begin	
"Unique" (with AGA) (獨一無二)	2016	Ginadoll Concert Live	
"Pairs" (with Eric Kwok)	2016	Begin and more	
"Love Will Stand The Test Of Time" (天變地變情不變)	2017	Prologue	
"Flight Attendant" (空姐)	2017	Live in the Moment	
"Saying Goodbye to Each Day" (和每天講再見)	2017	Live in the Moment	
和每天講再見 (with William So)	2017	Live in the Moment	
"Here I Come, Here I Go" (隨風而來隨風而去)	2017	Live in the Moment	Reached number one on Metro Radio in 2018.
"Fortitude" (很堅強)	2018	Bold and Beautiful	
"Believe" 信	2018	Bold and Beautiful	
自我感覺還好	2018	Bold and Beautiful	Canadian Chinese Pop Music Chart: 4
天地一沙鷗	2018	Bold and Beautiful	
"Wabi-sabi" (侘寂)	2018	Ukiyo-e 浮世繪	Canadian Chinese Pop Music Chart: 12
風靡	2018	Ukiyo-e 浮世繪	Reached number one in 2019.
孤獨門口	2019	Ukiyo-e 浮世繪	
以愛情的罪名	2019	Ukiyo-e 浮世繪	
浮世繪	2019	Ukiyo-e 浮世繪	
喘息空間 ("Breathe" Cantonese version)	2019	Ukiyo-e 浮世繪	
敢 "Fearless"	2020		
幸福門 "Door of Bliss"	2020	Dear Secret	
美男子與香煙 "Man and Cigarette"	2020	Dear Secret	

=== As a featured artist ===
Title	Year	Album	Notes
"One Plus One" (AGA featuring Gin Lee)	2011	One	Voiceover version (with Eason Chan) also released
"Xin Ren Dao" (Alan Tam featuring Gin Lee)	2017	Appreciation	
"Our Dream" (various artists)	2018		Theme song for ViuTV's World Cup program

=== Promotional singles ===
Title	Year	Notes
"Wish Me a Happy Valentine's Day" (祝我情人節快樂) (with Gary Chaw)	2011	Released December 2011
星足印 (with AGA, JW, Joyce Cheng)	2016	Theme song for the 39th Top Ten Chinese Gold Songs Award
你做我 (with Universal Music Artists)	2018	Released April 2018 in 我做你 你做我 STAND BY YOU
分享的勝利 (with Supper Moment)	2018	
為全世界歌唱 (Various artists)	2018	Theme song for the 41st Top Ten Chinese Gold Songs Award
