= Live in the Moment =

Live in the Moment may refer to:

== Academic ==
- Mindfulness, a psychological process of directing, focusing and feeling our attention to experiences occurring in the present moment

== Albums ==
- Live in the Moment (album), a 2017 Cantonese-language studio album by Gin Lee
- Live...in the Moment, a 2007 live album by Vic Juris
- Live...in the Moment, a 2016 live album by Gang of Four

== Songs ==
- "Live in the Moment" (song), a 2017 song by Portugal. The Man from Woodstock
- "Live in the Moment", a 2015 song by Hala Al Turk
- "Live in the Moment", a 2016 song by Teenage Fanclub from Here
- "Live in the Moment", a 2018 song by Craig David from The Time Is Now

== Expression ==
- Carpe diem, "seize the day", saviour life and realize the importance of the moment

== See also ==
- Living in the Moment (disambiguation)
- Live for the Moment (disambiguation)
