= List of Billboard China V Chart number-one videos of 2018 =

The following is a list of the number-one music videos of 2018 on the weekly Billboard China V Chart. The chart ranks the weekly most viewed music videos using data from Chinese video-sharing site YinYueTai.

== Chart history ==
Issue date	Music video	Artist(s)	Reference
January 1	"Sleep"	Roy Wang	
January 8	"渡"	Joker Xue	
January 15	"Sleep"	Roy Wang	
January 22	"Sleep"	Roy Wang	
January 29	"渡"	Joker Xue	
February 5	"渡"	Joker Xue	
February 12	"渡"	Joker Xue	
February 19	"渡"	Joker Xue	
February 26	"渡"	Joker Xue	
March 3	"像风一样"	Joker Xue	
March 12	"橙色天空"	Xu Weizhou	
March 19	"橙色天空"	Xu Weizhou	
March 26	"因为遇见你2018版"	Roy Wang	
April 2	"因为遇见你2018版"	Roy Wang	
April 9	"因为遇见你2018版"	Roy Wang	
April 16	"因为遇见你2018版"	Roy Wang	
April 23	"Dawn of us"	Jackson Wang	
April 30	"Dawn of us"	Jackson Wang	
May 7	"Dawn of us"	Jackson Wang	
May 14	"Dawn of us"	Jackson Wang	
May 21	"Dawn of us"	Jackson Wang	
May 28	"Dawn of us"	Jackson Wang	
June 4	"Dawn of us"	Jackson Wang	
June 11	"最后"	Wang Bowen	
June 18	"Wait A Minute"	乐华七子NEXT	
June 25	"最后"	Wang Bowen	
July 2	"最后"	Wang Bowen	
July 9	"野兽"	王一浩	
July 16	"野兽"	王一浩	
July 23	"卡路里"	Rocket Girls 101	
July 30	"Pull Up"	Cai Xukun	
August 6	"Pull Up"	Cai Xukun	
August 13	"Pull Up"	Cai Xukun	

== See also ==
- 2018 in Chinese music
- List of Global Chinese Pop Chart number-one songs of 2018
