= Living in the Moment =

Living in the Moment may refer to:

- Living in the Moment (Across Five Aprils EP), 2004
- Living in the Moment, an EP by Mason Jennings, 2002
- "Living in the Moment", a song by Jason Mraz from Love Is a Four Letter Word
- "Living in the Moment", a song by Jorma Kaukonen from Stars in My Crown
- "Living in the Moment", a song by Katharine McPhee
- "Living in the Moment", a song by Ross Lynch from the television series Austin & Ally

== See also ==
- Living in a Moment, a 1996 album by Ty Herndon
  - "Living in a Moment" (song), the title song
- Live in the Moment (disambiguation)
- Live for the Moment (disambiguation)
