= Live for the Moment =

Live for the Moment or Living for the Moment may refer to:

- Live for the Moment, 2004 film with Noel Fitzpatrick

== Music ==
- Live for the Moment, album or the title song, by The Sherlocks, 2017
- "Live for the Moment", song by Loudness from Racing
- Living for the Moment 2000 album by Michael McCarthy (singer)
- "Living for the Moment", song by Steven Curtis Chapman from More to This Life
- "Living for the Moment", song by N-Dubz from Love.Live.Life

== See also ==
- Live in the Moment (disambiguation)
- Living in the Moment (disambiguation)
