= What's Wrong (Eric Chou song) =

- Title card

Single by Eric Chou

from the album Freedom
- Released: January 10, 2019
- Recorded: 2018
- Studio: Yang Dawei Recording Studio (Taipei)
- Genre: Pop
- Length: 5:21
- Label: Sony Music Taiwan
- Songwriters: Wu Yiwei; Eric Chou
- Producer: Eric Chou

Eric Chou singles chronology
| "Nobody But Me" (2018) | "What's Wrong" (2019) | "Something About LA" (2019) |

Music video
- "What's Wrong" on YouTube

"What's Wrong" (Chinese: 怎麼了; pinyin: Zěn me le) is a song recorded by Taiwanese singer-songwriter Eric Chou. It was released through Sony Music Taiwan on January 10, 2019, for his first extended play and fourth studio album, Freedom (2019). A pop and R&B song, "What's Wrong" was written by Wu Yiwei and Chou whilst production was handled by Chou. Its composition primarily utilizes piano, string, and drum instrumentations while its lyrics revolve around themes of romance.

"What's Wrong" was met with success in Taiwan and Greater China, where it amassed over 180 million views on YouTube and 120 million streams on Spotify. In Singapore, the song reached number one on the regional chart and number five on the top streaming chart. In Malaysia, it reached number two on the Chinese singles chart. It was named one of the Top Ten Chinese Songs of the Year at the 2020 Hito Pop Music Awards.

== Background and development ==
In 2018, Chou participated in the music program The Rap of China, where he and his teammates co-wrote a song to meet the competition's requirements. Chou composed the first part of the song, while the rest was composed by his teammates. He grew particularly fond of the main portion he had written and envisioned incorporating it into his own album or EP. When he later released his EP, he used his original section as the foundation and rewrote the entire song to make it his own.

== Music video ==
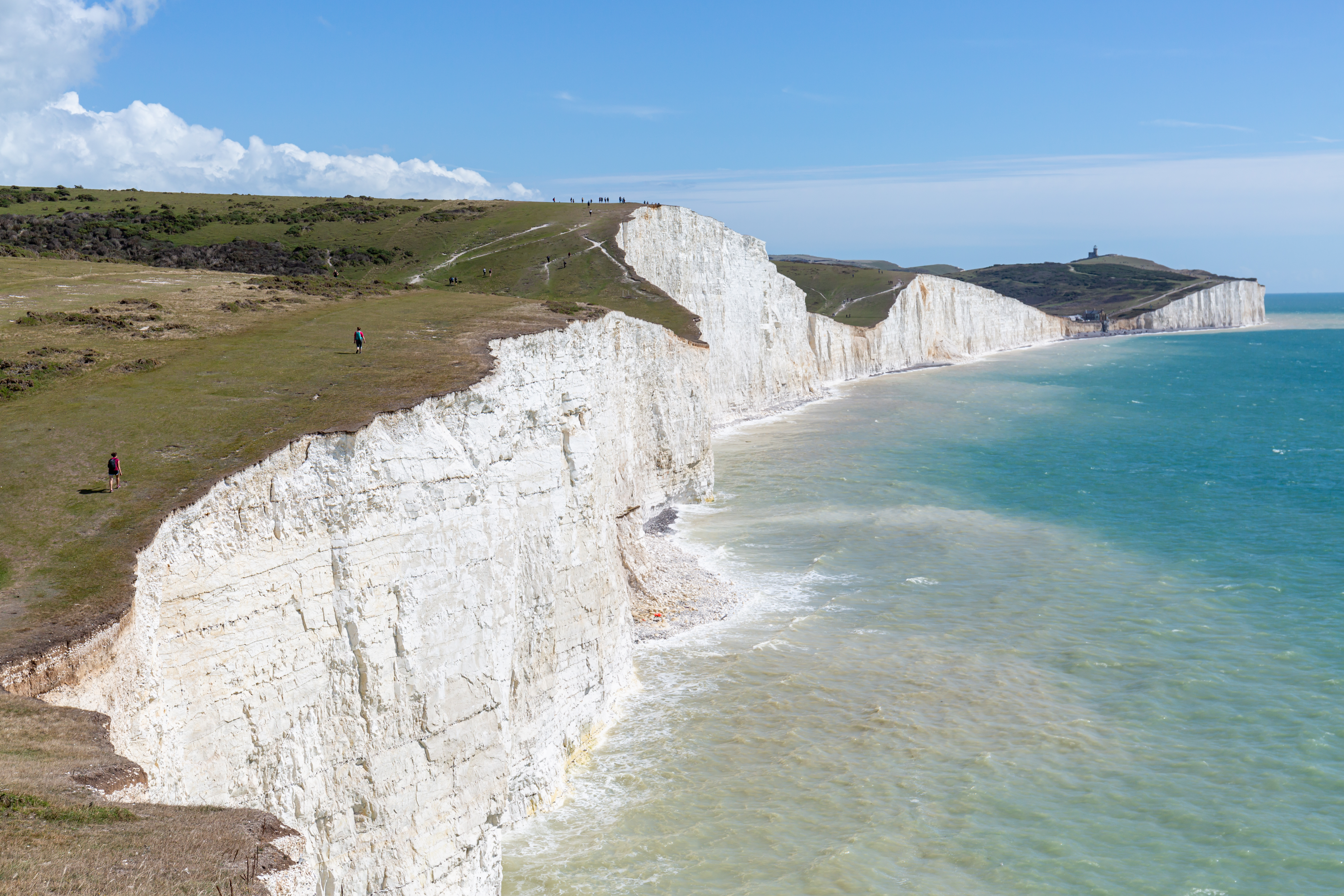
The music video was partially shot at Seven Sisters in England.

The music video for "What's Wrong" was partly filmed at the Seven Sisters cliffs along the English Channel in England. It features drone shots of white cliffs and the coastline.

== Live performances ==
On April 14, 2019, Chou performed "What's Wrong" at the Singapore Star Awards 2019. On January 18, 2020, Chou performed it at the 15th KKBox Music Awards at the Taipei Arena.

== Credits and personnel ==
Recording

- Recorded at Yang Dawei Recording Studio, Zhongzheng District, Taipei

Personnel

- Eric Chou – vocals, background vocals, composer, arranger
- Wu Yiwei – lyricist
- Yu Jingyan – arranger, recording engineer
- Zhang Jingyu – music video director
- Yang Dawei – mixing engineer

== Charts ==
Chart performance for "What's Wrong"
| Chart (2019–2022) | Peak position |
|---|---|
| China (TME Uni Chart) | 14 |
| Malaysia Chinese Chart (RIM) | 2 |
| Singapore (RIAS) | 5 |
| Singapore Regional (RIAS) | 1 |
| Taiwan (Billboard) | 14 |

== Release history ==
Release dates and formats
| Region | Date | Format | Label |
|---|---|---|---|
| Various | January 10, 2019 | Digital download; streaming | Sony Music Taiwan |
