= How Have You Been? =

Single by Eric Chou

from the album What Love Has Taught Us
- Language: Mandarin
- Released: May 20, 2016
- Recorded: 2016
- Genre: Pop
- Length: 4:47
- Label: Sony Music Taiwan
- Songwriters: Wu Yiwei; Eric Chou
- Producer: Eric Chou

Eric Chou singles chronology
"Back to the Day" (2016)	"How Have You Been?" (2016)	"I Loved You" (2016)

Music video
- "How Have You Been?" on YouTube

"How Have You Been?" (Chinese: 你, 好不好?; pinyin: Nǐ, hǎobù hǎo?) is a song recorded by Taiwanese singer-songwriter Eric Chou. It was released through Sony Music Taiwan on May 20, 2016, for his first second studio album, What Love Has Taught Us (2016). A pop and R&B song, "How Have You Been?" was written by Wu Yiwei and Chou whilst production was handled by Chou. Its composition primarily utilizes piano, string, and drum instrumentations while its lyrics revolve around themes of romance.

"How Have You Been?" serves as the theme song for the Taiwanese drama Life List (2016). It was a success in Taiwan and Greater China, and peaked at number one on the Billboard Radio China Top 10 Chart. At the end of the year, it was ranked at number four on its year-end chart for 2016. It has amassed over 250 million views on YouTube, making it the third most-viewed music video by a Chinese artist on the platform. Its accolades include Top 20 Songs of 2016 from the Music Radio China Top Chart Awards.

== Background and development ==
Chou composed "How Have You Been?" for the Taiwanese drama Life List (遗憾拼图) at the request of TVBS. While walking in the park with his dog, he came up with a melody in his head inspired by the scenery and sunshine, which he quickly recorded on his phone. Upon returning home, he developed the melody further. For the song's production, Eric Chou collaborated with his longtime partner, Chen Jianqi, and invited Wu Yiwei to co-write the lyrics.

== Music video ==
Chou invited Jizo to direct the music video for "How Have You Been?". The storyline follows an elderly man reminiscing about his past with his late wife, reflecting on their shared moments with a lingering sense of regret. Chou portrays the younger version of the old man, donning a high school uniform with a schoolbag. During filming, bad weather conditions led to heavy rain within three hours of shooting. Instead of halting production, Jizo found the rain visually appealing, and incorporated it into the video to enhance its atmosphere.

== Live performances ==
Chou performed the song at various events, including the 2016 Hito Pop Music Awards on June 5, the Singapore Marina Bay New Year's Eve Party on December 31, 2016, and the 2017 Super Star Red and White Entertainment Awards on January 27. On the Voice of China Our Song episode 10, the song was covered by Zhang Bichen and Zhang Xincheng.

== Credits and personnel ==
Recording

- Recorded at Yang Dawei Recording Studio, Zhongzheng District, Taipei

Personnel

- Eric Chou – vocals, background vocals, composer, arranger
- Wu Yiwei – lyricist
- Yu Jingyan – arranger, recording engineer
- Zhang Jingyu – music video director
- Yang Dawei – mixing engineer

== Charts ==
=== Weekly charts ===
Chart (2016–2018)	Peak position
China Airplay (Billboard Radio China)	1
Malaysia Chinese Chart (RIM)	4
Singapore Regional (RIAS)	14

=== Year-end charts ===
Chart (2016)	Position
China Airplay (Billboard Radio China)	4

== Release history ==
Release dates and formats
Region	Date	Format	Label
Various	May 20, 2016	Digital download; streaming	Sony Music Taiwan
