= My Way to Love =

Studio album by Eric Chou
- Released: 24 December 2014
- Recorded: 2012–2014
- Genre: Pop; R&B
- Length: 46:12
- Language: Mandarin
- Label: Sony Music Taiwan
- Producer: Chen Chien; Eric Chou

Eric Chou chronology
My Way to Love (2014)	What Love Has Taught Us (2016)

Singles from My Way to Love
- 1. "The Distance of Love" Released: 1 August 2014; 2. "My Way to Love" Released: 10 December 2014; 3. "Love You Again" Released: 6 January 2015

My Way to Love (Chinese: 學著愛; pinyin: Xuézhe ài) is the debut studio album of Taiwanese singer-songwriter Eric Chou, released by Sony Music Taiwan on 19 December 2014. Taiwanese producer and Golden Melody Award winner Chen Chien Chi served as the album producer.

The album contains 11 songs, all composed by Chou, including the smash hit, "The Distance of Love", which was used as the ending theme of the 2014 Taiwanese drama The Way We Were.

== Background and release ==
Chou wrote the song "The Distance of Love" when he was still a student in Boston, USA. He drew inspiration from his failed attempt at impressing a girl he liked in high school. He would then perform the song at Taiwanese actors Eddie Huang (黃懷晨) and Queenie Tai's wedding, where he was talent scouted by the former, as a recommendation by Chou's father who "has a son that can sing".

Eventually, the song was used as the ending theme of the 2014 Taiwanese drama The Way We Were. It was officially released as a single under Sony Music Taiwan on 1 August 2014, and appeared on Chou's debut studio album which was released on 24 December of that same year.

== Reception ==
The album went on to top 18 charts upon its release, and the music video for "The Distance of Love" reached more than 100 million views on YouTube, making Chou the youngest Mandopop artist who had the most views in the platform at that time. My Way to Love was certified platinum by the Recording Industry Association of Singapore (RIAS).

== Track listing ==
All tracks are written by Eric Chou.

My Way to Love track listing
No.	Title	Length
1.	"My Way to Love" (學著愛)	4:14
2.	"The Distance of Love" (以後別做朋友)	4:18
3.	"Come Out Your Way" (在你耳邊說)	3:52
4.	"Those Years" (跟鋼琴說話)	4:41
5.	"Shy of Love" (怎麼好意思)	3:58
6.	"Romance Movie" (愛情導演)	4:36
7.	"Love at Christmas (featuring Rosie 楊凱琳)" (愛在聖誕)	4:44
8.	"I Miss U" (會飛的想念)	4:03
9.	"Shutter in Love" (音樂快門)	3:39
10.	"Love You Again" (再愛你)	4:19
11.	"Come Out Your Way (English Version)"	3:48
Total length:		46:12

== Certifications ==
Region	Certification	Certified units/sales
Singapore (RIAS)	Platinum	10,000^{*}
^{*} Sales figures based on certification alone.

== Release history ==
Release history for My Way to Love
Region	Date	Format(s)	Label
Various	24 December 2014	Digital download; streaming	Sony Music Taiwan
Taiwan	24 December 2014	CD	Sony Music Taiwan
