= Unbreakable Love =

- Single cover

Single by Eric Chou

from the album The Chaos After You
- Language: Mandarin
- Released: May 24, 2017
- Genre: Pop
- Length: 4:13
- Label: Sony Music Taiwan
- Songwriter(s): Rao Xueman
- Composer(s): Eric Chou

Eric Chou singles chronology
"Let It Go" (2017)	"Unbreakable Love" (2017)	"Happiness at Once" (2017)

Music video
- "Unbreakable Love" on YouTube

"Unbreakable Love" (Chinese: 永不失聯的愛; pinyin: Yǒng bù shī lián de ài; lit. Love that never loses contact) is a single recorded by Taiwanese singer-songwriter Eric Chou. It was released through Sony Music Taiwan on May 24, 2017, for his third studio album The Chaos After You (2017). The pop ballad was written by Rao Xueman, composed by Chou, and produced by Yuan Weixiang and Lu Shengfei.

== Background and development ==
"Unbreakable Love" serves as the theme for the online drama The Elfin's Golden Castle (2018) and is also featured as an interlude in the television series Second Place's Counterattack (2021).

The plot of The Elfin's Golden Castle was adapted from Rao Xueman's novel. During the filming process, Chou, the male lead, was informed by Rao about the need for a theme song. While others were filming, Chou started humming a melody that he found promising. He recorded it on his phone, completed the song the next day. When he shared it with Rao, she wrote the lyrics within only a day.

== Credits and personnel ==
- Eric Chou – vocals, background vocals, composer
- Rao Xueman – lyricist
- Lu Shengfei – arranger
- Yuan Weixiang – producer
- Lu Shengfei – producer
- Chen Bozhou – drums

== Charts ==
=== Weekly charts ===
Chart (2018)	Peak position
Malaysian Chinese Chart (RIM)	4

== Release history ==
Release dates and formats
Region	Date	Format	Label
Various	May 24, 2017	Digital download; streaming	Sony Music Taiwan
