= The Distance of Love =

- Single cover

Single by Eric Chou

from the album My Way to Love
- Language: Mandarin
- Released: August 1, 2014
- Genre: Pop
- Length: 3:54
- Label: Sony Music Taiwan
- Songwriter: Wu Yiwei
- Producer: Eric Chou

Eric Chou singles chronology
| "The Distance of Love" (2014) | "My Way to Love" (2014) |

Music video
- "The Distance of Love" on YouTube

"The Distance of Love" (Chinese: 以後別做朋友; pinyin: Yǐhòu Bié Zuò Péngyǒu; lit. Let's Not Be Friends Anymore) is the debut single by Taiwanese singer-songwriter Eric Chou. It was released as through Sony Music Taiwan on August 1, 2014, for his debut studio album My Way to Love (2014). The pop ballad was written by Wu Yiwei and composed by Chou.

"The Distance of Love" was met with instant success in Taiwan and Greater China, and has amassed over 200 million views on YouTube. The song served as the ending theme song of the Taiwanese television series The Way We Were (2014).

== Background and development ==
The song "The Distance of Love" was inspired by Chou's personal experience of an unrequited confession. While studying in Boston, he developed feelings for a classmate. Before graduating, he expressed his love to her but was turned down. He recalled composing the melody for the song in his dorm room the following day while feeling heartbroken.

In an interview, Chou recalled that the experience made him want to become a musician, saying, "things seemed to be going well with her at first, but then she just wanted to be friends later on. I thought I’d really get into music to make myself appear more charming, and that was actually the initial motivation".

== Music video ==
In the music video for "The Distance of Love", Chou plays the piano on a beach and on a truck. The filming process lasted over 24 hours. Despite receiving diving training beforehand, Chou was nervous during the shoot that he almost experienced hypothermia. Nevertheless, his prior diving experience enabled him to deliver a smooth performance, including lip-syncing, underwater.

== Live performances ==
Chou performed "The Distance of Love" at the TVBS New Year's Eve Party in Taiwan on December 31, 2014, and at the 2015 KKBox Music Awards on February 8, 2015.

== Credits and personnel ==
- Eric Chou – vocals, background vocals, composer
- Wu Yiwei – lyrics
- Chen Jianqi – arrangement
- Zhang Jingyu – music video director

== Charts ==
| Chart (2018) | Peak position |
|---|---|
| Singapore Regional (RIAS) | 8 |

== Release history ==
Release dates and formats
| Region | Date | Format | Label |
|---|---|---|---|
| Various | August 1, 2014 | Digital download; streaming | Sony Music Taiwan |
