= Freedom (Eric Chou album) =

- Studio album cover

Studio album by Eric Chou
- Released: December 24, 2019
- Recorded: 2018–2019
- Genre: Pop; EDM; R&B
- Length: 23:10 (EP); 37:11 (full album)
- Language: Mandarin; English
- Label: Sony Music Taiwan; M. Star Entertainment
- Producer: Eric Chou; Freddy Häggstam

Eric Chou chronology
| The Chaos After You (2017) | Freedom (2019) | When We Were Young (2020) |

Alternate cover
- EP cover

Singles from Freedom
- 1. "Nobody But Me" Released: December 14, 2018; 2. "What's Wrong" Released: January 10, 2019; 3. "Something About LA" Released: August 23, 2019; 4. "Forever Beautiful" Released: October 1, 2019

Freedom (Chinese: 終於了解自由; pinyin: Zhōngyú liǎojiě zìyóu) is the first extended play (EP) and fourth studio album by Taiwanese singer-songwriter Eric Chou. Freedom was first released as an EP by Sony Music Taiwan on January 10, 2019, featuring the singles "Nobody But Me" and "What's Wrong". A deluxe edition of the Freedom EP was reissued as a studio album on December 24, 2019.

The tracks from Freedom were inspired by Western pop music Chou grew up with when he studied in the United States. The work demonstrates Chou's creative energy, representing music from his debut to the present by further exploring the EDM genre and R&B. The album was certified platinum by the Recording Industry Association Singapore (RIAS).

== Background and release ==
Chou participated in the Tencent competition Chao Yin Idols in August 2018. He co-wrote the song "What's Wrong" with Chinese singer and actor Wu Jiacheng, writing the verse and the bridge parts. The song is inspired by Chinese singer Su Yunying's "Fairy" from her debut album Ming Ming. The live version performed by Chou, Wu, and Su, which included the chorus of the song "Fairy" was released digitally on Chinese streaming platforms on the same month.

For the previous album, The Chaos After You, Chou flew to Sweden to collaborate with Swedish producer Freddy Häggstam to incorporate different musical styles in his songs such as EDM. Chou would eventually co-produce Freedom with Häggstam. The EP was officially released on January 10, 2019, along with the music video of "What's Wrong".

== Writing and composition ==
In January 2019, Chou held a listening party for his then upcoming EP, where he also announced his relationship with news anchor Dacie Chao. According to Chou, he did not have the motivation to write songs during his past relationships, but the new relationship gave him a lot of inspiration, noting that love can create love songs that can move people. Chou added that he couldn't write love songs before when he was happy and not in pain, but now he can.

== Singles ==
In December 2018, Chou released the single, "Nobody But Me", along with its music video. On February 14, 2019, Chou released the music video for "At Least I Remember" which he first performed at the 15th KKBOX Music Awards the previous month. The music video marked Chou's directorial debut. On April 4, 2019, the music video for the title song "Freedom" which was filmed using Apple's iPhone XS Max, was released.

In August 2019, Chou released his single "Something about LA", and "Forever Beautiful" in support for a breast cancer campaign in October 2019. Both songs appeared on the deluxe version of the EP which became Chou's fourth studio album released on December 24, 2019.

== Track listing ==
All tracks are written by Eric Chou.

Freedom – Extended play
| No. | Title | Length |
|---|---|---|
| 1. | "Old Days" | 3:18 |
| 2. | "Nobody but Me" | 4:13 |
| 3. | "What's Wrong" (怎麼了) | 5:21 |
| 4. | "At Least I Remember" (至少我還記得) | 5:04 |
| 5. | "Freedom" (終於了解自由) | 5:16 |
| Total length: | | 23:10 |

Freedom – Studio album (deluxe version)
| No. | Title | Length |
|---|---|---|
| 1. | "Old Days" | 3:16 |
| 2. | "Room for You" | 3:27 |
| 3. | "What's Wrong" (怎麼了) | 5:21 |
| 4. | "Something about LA" | 2:51 |
| 5. | "Nobody but Me" | 4:14 |
| 6. | "At Least I Remember" (至少我還記得) | 5:04 |
| 7. | "I Don't Mind" | 3:26 |
| 8. | "Forever Beautiful" (一樣美麗) | 4:38 |
| 9. | "Freedom" (終於了解自由) | 5:16 |
| Total length: | | 37:11 |

== Certifications ==
| Region | Certification | Certified units/sales |
|---|---|---|
| Singapore (RIAS) | Platinum | 10,000^{*} |
^{*} Sales figures based on certification alone.

== Release history ==
Release history for Freedom
| Region | Date | Format(s) | Version | Label |
|---|---|---|---|---|
| Various | January 10, 2019 | CD; digital download; streaming | Extended play (EP) | Sony Music Taiwan; M. Star |
| Various | December 24, 2019 | CD; digital download; streaming | Studio album (deluxe) | Sony Music Taiwan; M. Star |
