= The Chaos After You =

Studio album by Eric Chou
- Released: December 15, 2017
- Recorded: 2017
- Genre: Pop; EDM; R&B
- Length: 39:58
- Language: Mandarin
- Label: Sony Music Taiwan
- Producer: Eric Chou; Freddy Häggstam

Eric Chou chronology
What Love Has Taught Us (2016)	The Chaos After You (2017)	Freedom (2019)

Singles from The Chaos After You
- 1. "Unbreakable Love" Released: May 24, 2017; 2. "Happiness at Once" Released: September 16, 2017; 3. "Without Her" Released: November 17, 2017; 4. "The Chaos After You" Released: December 6, 2017

The Chaos After You (Chinese: 如果雨之後; pinyin: Rúguǒ yǔ zhīhòu) is the third studio album by Taiwanese singer-songwriter Eric Chou, released by Sony Music Taiwan on December 15, 2017.

Several singles were promoted for the album, including "The Chaos After You", "Unbreakable Love", and "Without Her". Commercially, the album was certified gold by the Recording Industry Association Singapore (RIAS) for surpassing sales of 5,000 units in Singapore.

== Background and development ==
Pre-orders for the album opened on November 17 and 18, coinciding with his second concert tour "22 Twenty Two". The album marked Chou's first time as production coordinator and producer of his own work. Chou flew to Sweden to collaborate with Swedish producer Freddy Häggstam in four songs. Over 100 songs were written for the album. "The Chas After You"

== Composition ==
The Chaos After You experiments with a variety musical styles such as EDM. According to Chou, "every song in the album is your emotional theme, and every song has their secret story to tell." "The Chas After You" conveys the idea that people experience pain, but if there is a turning point after the rain, happiness may emerge even in sorrow.

"Unbreakable Love" serves as the theme song for the TV series The Elfin's Golden Castle, adapted from Rao Xueman's novel. Chou, the show's male lead, was asked by Rao to create a theme song. After Chou recorded the melody on his phone, Rao wrote the song's lyrics within only a day. The duet "The Way You Make Me Feel" features Hsu Wei-ning. After hearing Hsu's voice, Chou found it sweet and appealing and invited her to collaborate on the song.

== Track listing ==
All tracks are written by Eric Chou.

The Chaos After You track listing
No.	Title	Length
1.	"Without Her"	03:35
2.	"Get Out of My Head" (易碎品)	04:15
3.	"Another You"	03:31
4.	"The Chaos After You" (如果雨之後)	04:39
5.	"I See You Everywhere"	04:02
6.	"Unbreakable Love" (永不失聯的愛)	04:18
7.	"Happiness At Once" (快樂一次擁有)	03:42
8.	"Lies" (同義詞)	03:26
9.	"The Way You Make Me Feel (featuring Hsu Wei-ning)" (黏黏)	04:04
10.	"Smile With a Broken Heart" (我知道要微笑)	04:26
Total length:		39:58

== Certifications ==
Region	Certification	Certified units/sales
Singapore (RIAS)	Gold	5,000^{*}
^{*} Sales figures based on certification alone.

== Release history ==
Release history for The Chaos After You
Region	Date	Format(s)	Version	Label
Various	December 15, 2017	Digital download; streaming	Standard	Sony Music Taiwan
Taiwan	December 15, 2017	CD	Standard	Sony Music Taiwan
