= What Love Has Taught Us =

Studio album by Eric Chou
- Released: August 8, 2016
- Recorded: 2016
- Genre: Pop; R&B
- Length: 41:20
- Language: Mandarin
- Label: Sony Music Taiwan

Eric Chou chronology
My Way to Love (2014)	What Love Has Taught Us (2016)	The Chaos After You (2017)

Singles from What Love Has Taught Us
- 1. "Back to the Day" Released: May 4, 2016; 2. "How Have You Been?" Released: May 20, 2016; 3. "Let It Go" Released: July 27, 2016

What Love Has Taught Us (Chinese: 愛，教會我們的事; pinyin: Ài, jiàohuì wǒmen de shì) is the second studio album by Taiwanese singer-songwriter Eric Chou, released by Sony Music Taiwan on August 8, 2016. Pre-orders for the album began on July 22. The album contains 10 songs, all composed by Chou.

The single "How Have You Been?" experienced commercial success, topping the KKBOX Mandarin Singles Chart for 30 consecutive weeks, while its music video reached 185 million views by July 2022. Chou worked with producers Daniel Bi and Starr Chen to strengthen the album's sense of rhythm and to incorporate R&B elements.

== Background ==
In 2016, Chou served as a composer for the Chinese television series Magical Space-Time, writing three songs including "Back to the Day" which was performed by himself, and was used for as the theme song of the drama. The song will eventually appear on his then upcoming album.

== Release ==
A year and eight months after the release of his successful debut studio album My Way to Love, Chou released the first official single off of his new album, "How Have You Been?" According to Chou, he was walking in the park with his dog, Chopin, when he noticed a patch of green illuminated by sunlight, and a melody immediately flashed through his mind. He started working on the melody when he got home and pointed the 2015 film Brooklyn as one of the inspirations for the song. He also wrote the song for his late grandmother, who died shortly after his debut.

On August 8, 2016, Chou officially released his second studio album, What Love Has Taught Us.

== Track listing ==
All tracks are written by Eric Chou.

What Love Has Taught Us track listing
No.	Title	Length
1.	"-1 Minute" (負一分鐘)	4:24
2.	"Let It Go"	3:57
3.	"Obviously..." (明明)	3:39
4.	"How Have You Been?" (你，好不好?)	4:47
5.	"This Is Love"	3:57
6.	"No One Like You"	3:54
7.	"Just My Type" (我愛的那種)	3:47
8.	"What Love Has Taught Us" (愛情教會我們的事)	4:54
9.	"I'll Be Next To You" (認定)	3:39
10.	"Back to the Day" (想回到那一天)	4:22
Total length:		41:20

== Release history ==
Release history for What Love Has Taught Us
Region	Date	Format(s)	Label
Various	August 8, 2016	Digital download; streaming	Sony Music Taiwan
Taiwan	August 8, 2016	CD	Sony Music Taiwan
