= Hit FM (Taiwan) =

- Taipei; Taiwan
- Frequencies: 107.7 MHz (North); 91.5 MHz (Central); 90.1 MHz (South); 97.1 MHz (Yilan); 107.7 MHz (East)

Programming
- Language: Mandarin
- Format: Entertainment, Music, News

Ownership
- Owner: Voice of Taipei
- Sister stations: Taipei Pop Radio

History
- First air date: 17 September 1998; 27 years ago

Links
- Website: www.hitoradio.com

Hit FM is a pop music radio station in Taiwan. It broadcasts in Taipei, Taichung, and Kaohsiung. Hit FM is owned by Voice of Taipei Broadcasting (Chinese: 台北之音廣播; pinyin: Táiběi Zhī Yīn Guǎngbō). It is one of the radio stations under Hitoradio.com. Hit FM is the highest-rated Top Ten radio station in Taiwan.

== Features ==
=== Fresh Release ===
The show, "Fresh Release" broadcast pop music. Hit Fm is one of the Chinese radio stations that broadcasts songs. Their competitor, Kaohsiung-based KISS Radio Taiwan, also broadcasts Mandopop as well as English top 40 songs.

=== Hit DJ ===
Each Weekend, two artists (group) introduce music on air. Many Taiwanese/Mandarin Pop Music Artists, such as Jay Chou, Show Lo, A-Mei, Jolin Tsai, S.H.E, Leehom Wang, Stefanie Sun, F.I.R., etc., have done their time as DJs.

=== Hit FM No.1 ===
Every day, Hit FM introduces the No. 1 song from different music charts throughout the world.

- Monday: U.S. Billboard Hot 100
- Tuesday: Hito Chinese Pop Charts (Hito中文排行榜; Hito zhōngwén pái háng bǎng)
- Wednesday: UK Singles Chart
- Thursday: Japan Oricon Charts (オリコン)
- Friday: Global Chinese Board (全球華語排行榜; quánqiú huáyǔ pái háng bǎng)

=== Hit of the Century ===
Every day, Hit FM retrospects significant pop music from different era after 1980s. This show broadcasts at 7:15, 11:15, 15:15, 19:15, 00:15. But now this feature has been abolished.

== Annual Charts ==
Hit Fm Annual Top 100 Singles Chart (Hit-Fm年度百首單曲) is a yearly compilation chart since 1998, by Hit Fm of the top 100 singles by online poll, weekly charts, and sales volume (G-Music Charts).

== List of Hit Fm stations ==
Station	Frequency
Voice Of Taipei (臺北之音廣播電臺); East Taiwan Radio Station (東臺灣廣播電臺)	FM 107.7
Central Taiwan Radio (中臺灣廣播電臺)	FM 91.5
Kao-Ping Radio Station (高屏廣播電臺)	FM 90.1
Jhong-Shan Radio Station (中山廣播電臺)	FM 97.1
