= Taipei Pop Radio =

Taiwanese Mandopop radio station

Taipei POP Radio FM91.7 (Chinese: 台北流行音樂廣播電台; pinyin: Táiběi Liúxíng Yīnyuè Guǎngbō Diàntái) is a Taiwanese Mandopop radio station, began broadcasting on November 25, 1995. It replaced Hit FM as the seventh, Taiwan-based, contributing radio station member of the Global Chinese Pop Chart.
