= Gin Lee =

Malaysian singer (born 1987)

- 李幸倪
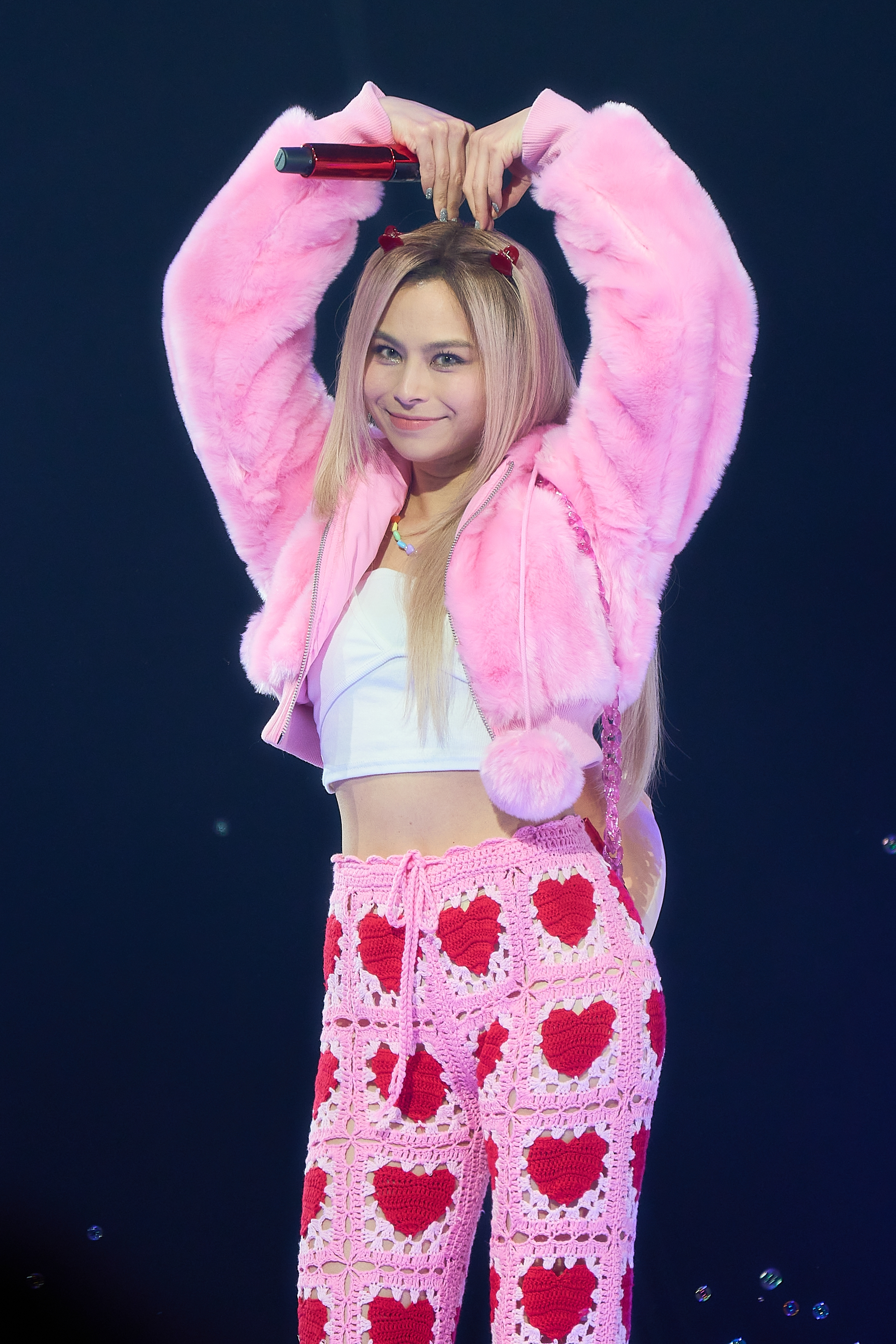
- Lee in March 2024
- Born: 26 August 1987 (age 39); Johor Bahru, Malaysia
- Education: International College of Music
- Occupations: Singer; songwriter; actress
- Years active: 2009–present
- Relatives: Meeia Foo (cousin)
- Musical career
- Also known as: Jeanie Lee
- Origin: Malaysia
- Genres: Pop, R&B
- Instruments: Vocals, piano, guitar, drums
- Label: Emperor Entertainment Group (2023–)· Universal Music Hong Kong (2014–2022)· BMA (2011–2014)

Chinese name
- Traditional Chinese: 李幸倪
Transcriptions
Standard Mandarin
- Hanyu Pinyin: Lǐ Xìngní
Yue: Cantonese
- Jyutping: Lei5 Hang6-ngai4

Jeanie Lee Hang-ngai (Chinese: 李幸倪; born 26 August 1987), better known by her stage name Gin Lee, is a Malaysian singer based in Hong Kong. Gin Lee debuted her singing career in 2009 by releasing her debut album One & Only in Malaysia. In 2010, she appeared on Hong Kong reality television singing competition The Voice 2 and gained popularity in Hong Kong for her vocal ability.

Lee subsequently moved to Hong Kong and made her Cantonese debut in 2011 under BMA Records with the EP Here I Come. She gained popularity in mainland China when she participated in the singing competition The Voice of China (season 4) in which Jay Chou was her mentor. In 2016, she signed with Universal Music (Hong Kong). Her 2016 album beGin topped the Hong Kong Record Merchants Association (HKRMA) sales chart for four weeks and was certified platinum by the Hong Kong Recording Industry Alliance (HKRIA). Singles from beGin achieved 61 number ones on music charts. She released her live recording concept album Live in the Moment in September 2017. The album was met with commercial success, topping the HKRMA sales chart for four consecutive weeks and reached gold certification within two months. Lee's cousin is Malaysian singer Meeia Foo.

== Life and career ==
=== Early life and career beginnings ===
Gin Lee was born in Johor Bahru, Malaysia to a family with music background. Her father was a professional drummer, her mother a live singer, and she has an elder sister. Lee recalls in an interview in 2016, "I started singing in front of people when I was three or four. My parents used to ask me to go on stage to sing for my relatives and I always loved performing in my kindergarten and primary school." Lee was part of her high school's track and field team, focusing on sprinting, but later stopped training due to persisting injuries. When she was 18 years old, she won Malaysia's Universal Music song writing competition. In 2007, she graduated from International College Of Music (ICOM) in Malaysia with a bachelor's degree, majoring in vocal music and arrangement. She released her debut Mandarin album ONE & ONLY through Fretlezz Production in Malaysia on 29 December 2009, writing most of the songs on it. The album was nominated at the 17th Malaysian Music Industry Awards for Best Local Chinese Album.

Lee appeared on Taiwanese singing competition Super Idol (of which her cousin Meeia Foo won second place in season 2) in May 2010, performing "Superwoman" and appeared on Hong Kong singing competition The Voice 2 as a challenger in August. Her performance of "Xin Bu Liao Qing / New Everlasting Love" (新不了情) earned a final score of 89.2 points, with judge and veteran singer Teresa Carpio awarding her 100 points. In the following round, Lee sang "If I Ain't Got You" but lost 87 to 92 points to Mag Lam, who went on to win the competition.

=== 2011–2014: Hong Kong debut under BMA ===
In 2011, Lee moved to Hong Kong and learned Cantonese on her own. She debuted as a Cantopop artist under record label BMA with the EP Here I Come. Tracks 1 and 2 (廢話少說 and 潛水) were released as singles, with the latter topping the Metro Radio pop chart. A special edition containing cover versions of "Superwoman" and "If I Ain't Got You" (produced by Malaysian-Chinese singer Gary Chaw) was released on 16 December. Gin Lee won the 2012 Metro Radio Hits Newcomer Award (Overseas).

In 2012, Falling was released as a single in support of her upcoming album, topping the Jade Solid Gold billboard and CRHK Ultimate 903 chart. "1st Date" was released was the second plug, and the self-titled studio album Gin Lee was released on 30 July 2012. The third single "Returning Home Alone Today" (今天終於一人回家) was well received, reaching number one on the RTHK Chinese chart and Metro Radio chart. The song garnered Gin Lee two awards at the 2012 Hong Kong Metro Radio Hit Music Awards: Hit Popular Singer and Hit New Media Song. In September 2013, Lee was voted the Best Performance Artiste of Malaysia at the 13th Global Chinese Music Awards (GCMA).

Four singles were released from her last EP under BMA, Ginetic, including a cover of famed 80's singer Danny Chan's "Just Loving You" (偏偏喜歡你). The EP was released on 13 November 2013. Single "Story of Rose" (玫瑰的故事) topped all major music charts in Hong Kong, becoming Gin Lee's first all kill. On 12 February 2014, Lee co-headlined charity concert (盛．載．愛傷健慈善音樂會) with singers Linda Wong and Joyce Lee. She was a guest performer at producer Eric Kwok's exhibition concert and also performed at singer Alex To's My Virtual Planet Tour Hong Kong show, receiving praises from both musicians. BMA did not renew Lee's contract when it ended in 2014. Lee recorded a duet entitled "One Plus One" (一加一, duet version of "One") with singer-songwriter AGA. An accompanying music video was released 19 September 2014.

=== 2015–2016: New label, Chinese singing competitions, and beGin ===
In a 2017 interview, Lee spoke about her time after her BMA contract ended, "In the first year of not having a label, I felt helpless and powerless. I wanted to go on but I didn’t know how to." She referred to that time period as her "dark time", having financial troubles, and had doubts on whether to stay in the music industry. "I have learned that sometimes you just need a struggle to establish a stronger faith," Gin Lee said. It was rumoured in December 2014 that Lee has signed with Universal Music Hong Kong in a 2 million HKD record deal for three years. Both Lee and Eric Kwok have stated in interviews that Kwok introduced Lee to Universal Music senior manager Duncan Wong.

In August 2015, Lee made her appearance on Chinese singing competition The Voice of China (season 4) in the fourth blind audition, singing Kit Chan's "Heartache". She earned the approval of coaches Na Ying and Jay Chou, and joined Jay Chou's team. Lee advanced to the Top 10 round, ultimately placing ninth overall, and third on Jay Chou's team. In November of the same year, after being recommended by Hong Kong singer Sandy Lam, Lee appeared in another singing competition 中國之星, performing 天黑黑 by Stefanie Sun.

Lee signed with Universal Music (Hong Kong) in December 2014, but this was not announced until 5 January 2016 at a press conference held at Grand Hyatt Hong Kong. Veteran singer Alan Tam (who is also signed with Universal Music) appeared to show his support for Lee. The lead single "Pairs" (雙雙) was released the same day along with its music video. A live showcase titled Gin Lee & You (雙雙與李幸倪音樂會) was held 27 January. A second single, "Man Beneath the Moon" (月球下的人), was released prior to the release of the album beGin on 18 April 2016. Lee has stated that the album name means to "begin" anew as well as to "be Gin" (be herself). Both singles were well received by radio stations, and topped many major charts in Hong Kong and abroad, including the Canadian Chinese POP Music Chart. A 360-degree music video sponsored by Nissan for "Man Beneath the Moon" was released 22 May. Lee composed two of the tracks on beGin and co-produced four of them. Other producers of beGin include Eric Kwok, Fergus Chow, and Alex Fung, with Sandy Lam co-producing the tenth track "Light" (光芒). The release of the Korean version of beGin on 20 May made Lee the first Hong Kong singer since Eason Chan to have an album released in South Korea. To promote the album, beGin Live was held on 24 May at the Kowloonbay International Trade & Exhibition Centre. A limited 1,000-copy SACD version of beGin was released on 24 June. beGin achieved major commercial success, being certified gold by HKRIA within two months of release.

Lee collaborated with labelmate AGA again, co-writing duet "Unique" (獨一無二), released September 2016. The track reached number one on many charts, including Billboard Radio China Cantonese Top 10, RTHK Chinese chart, and KKBox's Daily Cantonese Song Top 100. A duet version of "Pairs" was recorded with the song's composer Eric Kwok. The track was included in beGin and more, which contains live performances from beGin Live and remixes of "Unique" and "Man Beneath the Moon". beGin and more was released on 25 November 2016.

The success of beGin earned Lee many accolades in 2016, including four awards at the 2016 Metro Hit Awards. She won the gold prize for Best Female Singer, Best Song for "Pairs" and "Unique", with the latter also winning Best Duet. Lee also won the silver prize for Best Female Singer at the 2016 Ultimate Song Chart Awards Presentation.

=== 2017–2018: Live in the Moment and collaborations ===
In January 2017, Lee returned with a cover of Jacky Cheung's "The World May Change But Not Love" (天變地變情不變), reaching number one on the Global Chinese Pop Chart for two weeks, but performed moderately on local charts, peaking at number nine on Metro Radio and RTHK. Gin Lee was featured on Alan Tam's song "Xing Ren Dao" (型人道) for his 2017 Mandarin album Appreciation. Tam praised Lee, stating, "I love working with Lee, and enjoyed every moment recording the tune at the studio. She is a committed artiste who is not afraid to work hard. Give her a couple more years and I’m sure she will be a big star." Lee was invited by labelmate Prudence Liew to record a duet of "Torn Between Two Lovers" for her 2017 covers album Reincarnated Love.

Live in the Moment is Lee's third Cantonese studio album, and all eight tracks were recorded with a live band within five days. "Live recording the album was a good way to express the message of living in the moment," Lee said in an interview. Live in the Moment was preceded by the release of two singles, "Kong Jie" (空姐) and "Saying Goodbye to Every Day" (和每天講再見), with both reaching number one on RTHK Chinese chart and the Ultimate 903 Power Pick chart. Lee debuted "Saying Goodbye to Every Day" on 8 June at a concert series (903夢想系拉闊音樂會), co-headlined by herself and Justin Lo. Live in the Moment was released 8 September 2017. A deluxe edition was also issued, containing a photo book and a pass for one ticket to her Live in the Moment Concert held on 6 October at the Hong Kong Convention and Exhibition Centre. In support of the album, an exhibit was set up at the FWD (富衛) Passion Lab in Sheung Wan, Hong Kong from 11 September to 7 October. Gin Lee collaborated with William So, releasing a duet version of "Saying Goodbye to Every Day" in September with an accompanying music video. A limited, 1,000-copy SACD version of her album was released 17 October. A third single, "Come with the Wind, Gone With the Wind" was released in November. As of the first week of January 2018, the single has topped three stations (Ultimate, RTHK, Metro Radio). Live in the Moment won Most Popular Album at the Fourth Cantonese Song Chart Awards Presentation (第四屆粵語歌曲排行榜頒獎典禮) held at the Qian Yuan Stadium. "Saying Goodbye to Everyday" (和每天講再見) also won Most Popular Song. At the 2017 Ultimate Song Chart Awards, Lee again won the Silver Prize for Best Female Singer, and "Saying Goodbye to Everyday" was awarded Top 10 Song.

Lee was nominated for fan voted accolade Outstanding Regional Artiste (Malaysia) for the 17th Global Chinese Music Awards (GCMA 2017). Online voting took place from 4 to 18 October. On 18 November, a celebration event was held for Lee. Her album beGin was certified platinum and Live in the Moment was certified gold by HKRIA. It was also announced that Gin Lee will holding her first major concert at the Hong Kong Coliseum in June 2018.

A new single titled "Fortitude" (很堅強) was released to radio stations 12 January 2018.

On 14 March 2018, Lee announced on her Facebook page that her first compilation album, titled Prologue, will be released on 20 March, containing 15 tracks from her time at BMA. On 20 March, a press conference was held for her upcoming concert Gin Lee First of All Live set for 23 June. Tickets went on sale the next day. On 6 June, Lee announced on Facebook the release of a digital EP Believe (信) in China, Taiwan, Singapore and Malaysia, containing three Mandarin tracks. She released her fourth EP Bold and Beautiful on 9 June 2018.

=== 2019–2022: Mandarin comeback and Dear Secret ===
Lee's fifth studio album and second Mandarin-language album Ukiyo-e (浮世繪) was released on 19 July 2019. It was preceded by two singles: "Door of Loneliness" and "Crime of Love". Gin Lee collaborated with Jax Jones, recording the Cantonese and Mandarin versions of "Breathe". She also collaborated with Italian singer Eros Ramazzotti on "Vale per sempre", recording the Cantonese and Mandarin versions. These four new tracks were included in the second release of Ukiyo-e (浮世繪) on 13 November, which included a bonus DVD containing a studio live session.

At the 2020 AIM Chinese Music Awards presented by the Malaysian Recording Industry Association, Lee won Best Female Singer for her work in beGin.

On 16 July 2020, Lee debuted live her Cantonese single "Door of Bliss" (幸福門) on her online concert Gin Lee Music Suite, a series of live streams on YouTube. It was released on music platforms the next day, with the music video released on 24 July 2020. Lee's sixth studio album Dear Secret was released on 20 November 2020. The music videos of the three singles, "Door of Bliss", "Man and Cigarette", and "Lights Out" form the short film Dream Wanderlust (失格遊人). On 18 April 2021, at ViuTV's inaugural Chill Club Music Awards, Lee won Best Female Singer Bronze Prize and "Door of Bliss" was awarded Top 10 Song of the Year.

Lee appeared as a coach on the TVB's singing competition television series Stars Academy (2021–2022). Gin Lee released her first single of 2021 on 5 August "Let the Street Lights Rest When the Sun Rises" (日出時讓街燈安睡), featuring Jacky Cheung. The music video was released on 31 August.

On 16 May 2022, Universal Music confirmed that Lee did not renew her contract, and since her planned September concert would be outside the scope of the contract, the company would not be involved with it. Lee released her seventh studio album Time & Faith on 8 July.

=== 2023–present: EEG Music ===
Emperor Entertainment Group (EEG) announced the signing of Lee on 11 January with a 15 second teaser video, after reports emerged that Lee had signed with the record label in December. She released the dance track "Dum Dum" on 12 January. "Dum Dum" is the first collaboration between Lee and lyricist Wyman Wong. The single topped all five major charts in Hong Kong, and won Top 10 Song of the Year at the 2023 Ultimate Song Chart Awards. On 12 April, Lee released "Trivial Matters of Us", an R&B song. On 6 July, the ballad "Attention" was released. "Attention is written by Terry Chui and Wyman Wong. The song received widespread success and again topped all five music charts in Hong Kong. Lee released the single "Finally" on 25 September.

On 29 February 2024, Lee released the house track "Diff." On 20 March, she co-headlined 903 Lava Live concert, along with Fatboy, Jay Fung, and Jeremy Lee.

In 2024, Lee released songs themed around self-worth, including "Diff.", "Farewell to Gaslight," and "New Brand," all of which became 903-topping hits. Among them, "Diff." became Lee's third number one song on five major radio stations in her career, while "P Plater" became a number one song on four major radio stations. Lee also toured many universities and secondary schools to promote Cantonese song culture. In November, she would perform the traditional Disney Christmas program "Disney Christmas Music Live!" for the first time at Hong Kong Disneyland. On December 28th, Lee won the "Best Song" and "Best Female Singer Gold Award" at the 2024 Metro Radio Hit Awards for her song "P Plater". On January 1, 2025, Lee received her first "Gold Award for Best Female Singer" at the 2024 Ultimate Song Chart Awards Presentation. On June 2, 2025, at the 46th Top Ten Chinese Gold Songs Awards Presentation, Lee won the "Most Outstanding Female Pop Singer Award," becoming a grand slam winner of Hong Kong female singer awards for 2024.

On 22 February 2025, she released her eighth full-length studio album Leap of Faith. The album contains 11 tracks, along with two hidden tracks, including the Japanese single "Colourless" featuring VTuber Rio.

== Discography ==
- One & Only (2009)
- Here I Come (2011)
- Gin Lee: Falling (2012)
- Ginetic (2013)
- beGin (2016)
- Live in the Moment (2017)
- Prologue (Greatest Hits Collection) (2017)
- Bold & Beautiful (2018)
- Ukiyo-e 浮世繪 (2019)
- Dear Secret (2020)
- Time & Faith (2022)
- Leap of Faith (2025)

== Filmography ==
Title	Year	Role	Notes	Ref.
Trolls	2016	Poppy	Voice over (Cantonese version)	
The Moment	2016	佬姐	Cameo	
Trolls: World Tour	2020	Poppy	Voice over (Cantonese version)	
Stars Academy	2021–2022	Herself	Coach	

== Endorsements ==
- New Balance Hong Kong
- Shure Asia
- Biotherm
