= Eric Chou =

Taiwanese singer, songwriter and actor

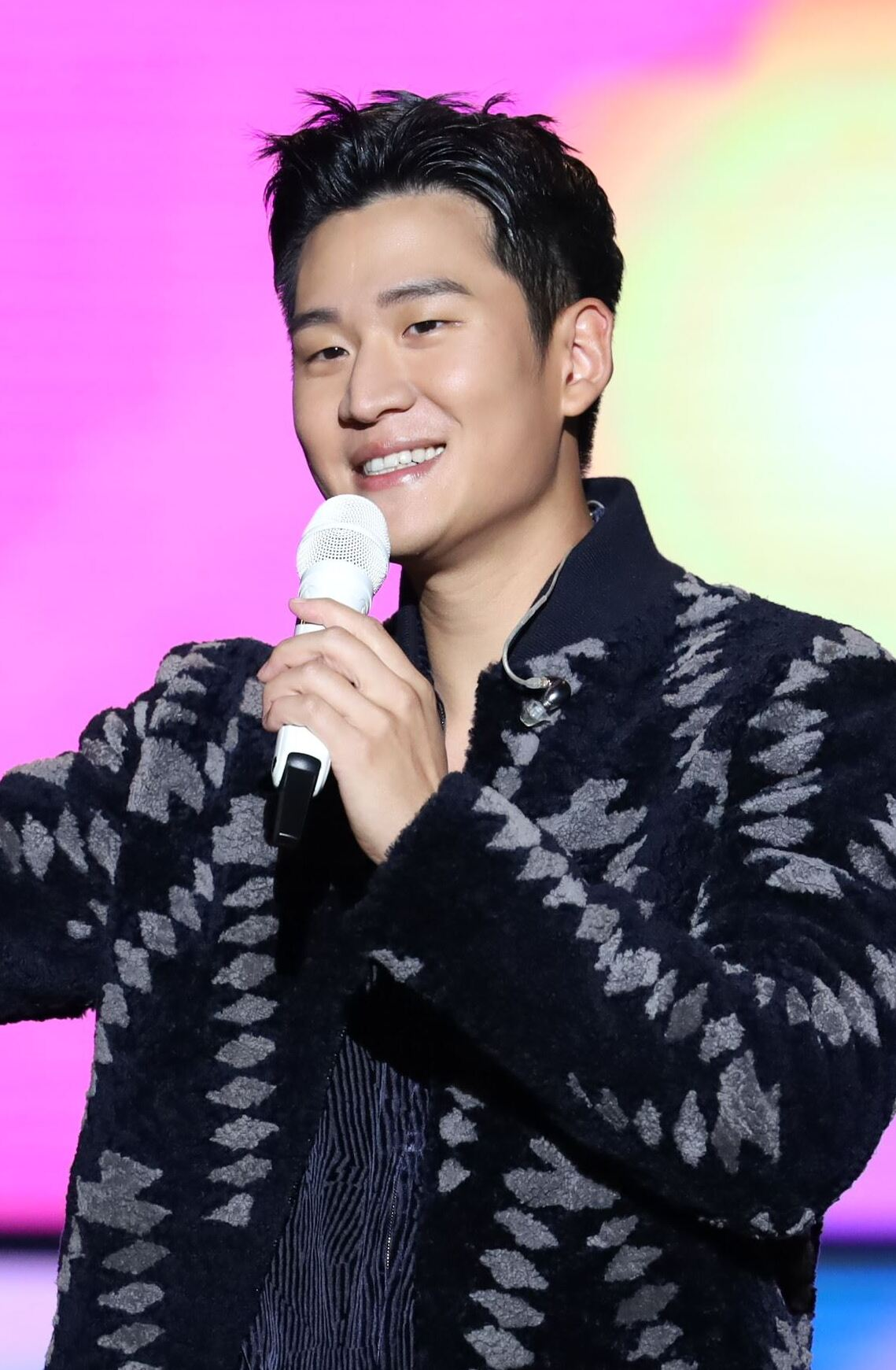
- Chou in 2023
- Born: June 22, 1995 (age 31); New Taipei City, Taiwan
- Occupations: Singer; songwriter
- Spouse: Dacie Chao (m. 2022)
- Children: 2
- Family: Alex Chou (brother)
- Musical career
- Genres: Mandopop; R&B; dance; electronic
- Instruments: Vocals; piano
- Years active: 2014–present
- Label: Sony Music Taiwan

Chinese name
- Traditional Chinese: 周興哲
- Simplified Chinese: 周兴哲
Transcriptions
Standard Mandarin
- Hanyu Pinyin: Zhōu Xīngzhé
Hakka
- Pha̍k-fa-sṳ: Chiu Hin-chet
Yue: Cantonese
- Jyutping: Zau1 Hing3 Zit3
Southern Min
- Hokkien POJ: Chiu Heng-tiat

Eric Chou Hsing-che (Chinese: 周興哲; pinyin: Zhōu Xīngzhé; born June 22, 1995) is a Taiwanese singer and songwriter. He has been dubbed by the Taiwanese media as "king of the lovelorn people". He debuted in August 2014 with the self-composed smash hit "The Distance of Love", which is the ending theme of the 2014 Taiwanese drama The Way We Were. It reached 100 million views on YouTube, making Chou the youngest Mandopop artist to reach the feat at that time. His debut studio album, My Way to Love, was released in December of that year.

In 2016, Chou released the single "How Have You Been?" from his second studio album What Love Has Taught Us (2016), which became a major hit in Greater China and the third most-viewed music video by a Chinese artist on YouTube, with over 250 million views. His following album, The Chaos After You, (2017) featured the singles "Unbreakable Love" and "The Chaos After You", with the latter earning him the Artist of the Year award at the KKBox Music Awards. His first extended play (EP) and fourth studio album, Freedom (2019), produced the hit single "What's Wrong".

== Life and career ==
=== 1995–2014: Early life and career beginnings ===
Eric Chou was born in Taiwan on June 22, 1995. He has two brothers—younger brother Jimmy/James, and older brother Alex (周予天) who is also active as a singer-songwriter. At a young age, he learned chess to improve his character, and even won a championship. When he was nine, his uncle brought him to watch Jay Chou's concert rehearsal. "When I heard him sing ‘Hair Like Snow’, that was the moment I was determined to become a singer-songwriter like him," Chou said. At the age of twelve, he moved with his family to Boston in the United States, where he attended Fay School and Northfield Mount Hermon School.

Chou recalled not being able to sit still when he first started learning the piano and had to be forced by his mother. However, playing the piano had become his outlet to express his emotions and started to play more during his spare time when he was in the US. His inspiration for songwriting comes from movies, his friends and personal experiences. During his time in Boston, he wrote the song, "The Distance of Love" (Chinese: 以後別做朋友, romanized: Yi Hou Bie Zuo Peng You, lit. 'Don't Be Friends From Now On'), inspired by his failed attempt to impress a girl he liked from high school. "I thought I'd really get into music to make myself appear more charming, and that was actually the initial motivation," Chou said. At eighteen, Chou returned to Taiwan due to his parents' work in Shanghai.

Chou was talent scouted by Taiwanese actor Edison Huang (黃懷晨) who heard from a friend that his son "can sing", and was asked to perform at his wedding with actress Queenie Tai when he was seventeen. He performed the song "The Distance of Love" which will eventually be chosen two years after as the ending theme of the Taiwanese drama The Way We Were where Tai also appeared. He also made his acting debut in the same drama by making a cameo as a singer.

=== 2014–2016: Debut album and What Love Has Taught Us ===
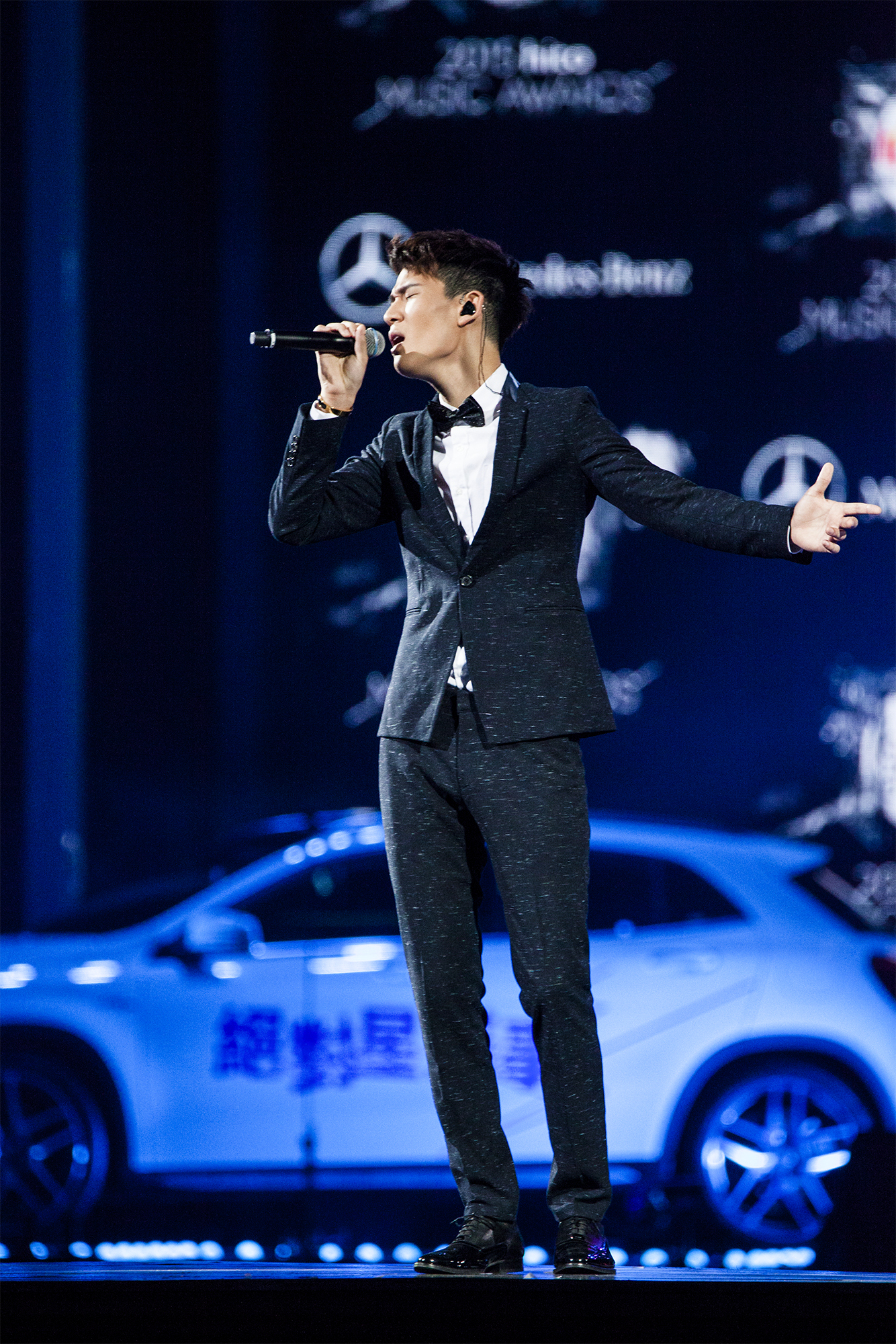
Chou in 2015

In August 2014, Chou released "The Distance of Love" as his first single under Sony Music Taiwan. The song will eventually appear in his debut studio album My Way to Love which was released on December 24. The album went on to top 18 charts upon its release. He won the TV Theme Song Award for "The Distance of Love" at the Hito Music Awards in 2015.

In 2016, Chou served as a composer for the Chinese television series Magical Space-Time. He wrote three songs including "I Love You So" which was performed by his brother Alex Chou, "Fleeting Happiness" by Taiwanese singer A-Lin, and "Back to the Day" by Chou himself, and was used for the opening, ending, and theme song of the drama respectively. He also had his first leading role in a micro drama for a ramen brand and released the theme song, "I Loved You".

On August 5, 2016, Chou released his second studio album, What Love Has Taught Us. It contained his hit single "How Have You Been?" which topped the KKBOX Mandarin Weekly Singles Chart for 30 consecutive weeks, and its music video reaching 185 million views as of July 2022. The song earned him the title "king of the lovelorn people". The album achieved success, and a solo concert, "This Is Love", has been announced to promote the album. Tickets for the Taipei show in November sold out within two minutes. The concert kicked off in Singapore on October, followed by Taipei in November, and then in Malaysia. Chou also performed for Rock On! 2017, the largest countdown party in Singapore on December 31, 2016.

=== 2017–2018: Second concert tour and The Chaos After You ===
In 2017, Chou performed at the 12th KKBOX Music Awards where he received the Artist of the Year award, the youngest singer to do so. In February 2017, he held his Valentine's concert in Macau where he performed his new song "Unbreakable Love", as well as a cover of Hebe Tien's "A Little Happiness". On May 21, 2017, Chou performed in his sold-out concert in Taipei where he also announced that he's already working on his new album. In August 2017, he announced the ticket-selling for his second concert tour "22 TWENTY TWO" in Taipei and the tickets sold out within 6 minutes. A second date has been added and tickets also sold out within an hour. Chou wrapped up his concert tour "This Is Love" on October and commenced with his second concert tour "22 TWENTY TWO" in November, where he premiered his new song "Without Her" which will eventually appear on his new album. On December 15, 2017, Chou released his third studio album, The Chaos After You. The album contains ten songs, including the title track of the same name. He capped off the year by performing at Taoyuan New Year's Eve countdown party.

In 2018, Chou won two awards at the Hito Music Awards including the friDay Digital Song Award for his song "The Chaos After You." In August 2018, he participated in the Tencent competition Chao Yin Idols where participants work with different artists to create a new musical style. During the competition, he co-wrote the song, "What's Wrong", with Chinese singer and actor Wu Jiacheng. The live version which they performed with Chinese singer Su Yunying was released digitally on Chinese streaming platforms on the same month. In November 2018, Chou appeared as the male lead in IQIYI web drama, The Elfin's Golden Castle. In December 2018, Chou released the single, "Nobody But Me", along with its music video.

=== 2019–present: Freedom and When We Were Young ===
On January 10, 2019, Chou released his first EP, Freedom, which consists of five tracks. It included the songs, "What's Wrong" and "Nobody But Me" which was released the previous year. At the 15th KKBOX Music Awards, Chou performed a medley of his songs, including "At Least I Remember" from his new EP. On May 11, 2019, Chou kicked off his concert tour "How Have You Been". It was his first time to perform in Taipei Arena in front of 11,000 fans. Tickets were reportedly sold out in two minutes. The concert also commenced in Kaohsiung Arena in August. In October 2019, Chou released his song "Forever Beautiful" in support for a breast cancer campaign.

In December 2019, Chou re-released a deluxe version of his EP Freedom as his fourth studio album which included the original five songs, and additional four new songs. Additionally, the music video for his song "What's Wrong" was hailed by YouTube to be the most viewed Mandopop music video, as well as the top 2 popular singer in Taiwan behind Jay Chou and above Jolin Tsai throughout 2019. Chou was also featured on G.E.M.'s song "Don't Force It".

On January 7, 2020, Chou released his fifth studio album, When We Were Young. The album consists of eleven tracks, including "I'm Happy".

On August 8, Chou became the first singer to hold a concert at Taipei Arena since the COVID-19 pandemic started as part of his "How Have You Been Tour". The show was sold at full capacity, attracting 10,000 concertgoers. To raise funds for the COVID-19 pandemic, Eric Chou donated all proceeds from a new remake of "Forever Beautiful", sung together with other Asian Sony artists.

Chou’s sixth album, named “Almost," or 《幾乎是愛情》 in Mandarin, includes eleven songs and was released on November 25, 2024. This is the first album he cooperated with Warner Music Taiwan Ltd., with the aim to expand into international market.

== Personal life ==
In January 2019, Chou announced that he has been in a relationship with Sanlih news anchor Dacie Chao (born c. 1989) since March 2018, after previously denying the rumors. The couple broke up in October 2020 and reunited in 2021. Chou announced their engagement in October 2022 and revealed that he had proposed to Chao in Europe on a hotel balcony in March that year. In March 2023, Chou announced that he and Dacie are expecting their first child together. In August 2023, Chou announced the birth of their daughter. In January 2025, the couple announced the birth of their first son.

== Discography ==
- My Way to Love (2014)
- What Love Has Taught Us (2016)
- The Chaos After You (2017)
- Freedom (2019)
- When We Were Young (2020)
- Almost (2024)

== Charitable Activities ==
In 2019, The Estée Lauder Companies, Inc. (台灣雅詩蘭黛集團) in Taiwan invited Chou to compose a song for its breast cancer awareness campaign. He wrote and sang the song “Forever Beautiful,” or (《一樣美麗》) in Mandarin, depicting the presence of hope even in times of despair. The track resonated with fans worldwide, inspiring numerous fan-made remixes and music videos. Moved by the responses, Chou and Sony Music Taiwan invited artists across different countries, fields, and languages to record a “All For One” version in 2020. All royalties earned by this version will be donated to charitable causes.

In 2023, Chou continued to participate in charity events. Appointed as the goodwill ambassador for the Sunshine Social Welfare Foundation, Chou supported children to recover from burn injuries and facial disfigurement. Encouraging the public to show understanding and compassion, Chou announced that donation boxes will be placed at his “Odyssey” concert to raise funds that directly support the foundation's rehabilitation services, aiming to help children rebuild confidence and resilience.

== Filmography ==
=== Film ===
| Year | English title | Original title | Role | Notes |
|---|---|---|---|---|
| 2016 | Love, Meet again | 又見麵，幸福的味道 | A-zhe | Short film |
| 2022 | My Best Friend's Breakfast | 我吃了那男孩一整年的早餐 | Tao You-quan | |

In 2022, Chou He made his acting debut in the romantic comedy film My Best Friend’s Breakfast. Aside from being the male lead, he also composed the film's soundtrack. His performance earned him the nomination at the 59th Golden Horse Awards in 2022 as the Best New Performer and Best Original Film Song. Upon learning his nominations, Chou stated, "It tastes like sweet wine, and it feels like I’m up in the clouds." Despite not winning the Best New Performer award, his song "What’s on Your Mind" successfully captured the Best Original Film Song award.

=== Television series ===
| Year | English title | Original title | Role | Notes |
|---|---|---|---|---|
| 2014 | The Way We Were | 16個夏天 | Himself | Cameo; episodes 4, 10, 14, 16 |
| 2018 | The Elfin's Golden Castle | 小妖的金色城堡 | Lin Nanyi | Webseries |
| 2019 | Girl's Power | 女兵日記女力報到 | Himself | Cameo |
| 2020 | Young Days No Fears | 我的青春沒在怕 | Himself | Cameo |
| 2022 | Mom, Don't Do That | 媽，別鬧了！ | young Chen Guang-hui | Cameo; Netflix series |
| 2026 | Fired Up! | 來！金來號！ | Chou Lu-yung | Main Role; Taiwanese drama debut |

=== Television show ===
| Year | English title | Original title | Role | Notes |
|---|---|---|---|---|
| 2017 | Sound of My Dream 2 | 夢想的聲音 | Himself | Episode 9, 10 |
| 2018 | Chao Yin Idols | 潮音战纪 | Himself | Idol Reality Show (Tencent) |
| 2023 | Infinity and Beyond 2023 | 聲生不息•寶島季 | Himself | Episodes 6–9 (Hunan TV) |
| 2023 | Starlight BnB | 光開門就很忙了 | Himself; Chef | Reality Show (TVBS, TTV, Netflix) |

In 2017, Chou participated in the television show Sound of My Dream 2, in which he challenged singer Jane Zhang by performing her signature song "Finally Wait 'till You". Chou spent 10 hours remaking the songs and added EDM elements. Even though Chou failed to defeat Jane in the challenge, he still earned respect from his idol, JJ Lin, who complimented Chou’s falsetto and joked that he was scared that Chou would challenge him and steal his fans.

== Concerts ==
=== Concert tours ===
- This Is Love (2016–2017)
- 22 Twenty Two (2017–2018)
- How Have You Been Tour (2019–2020)
- Odyssey Journey World Tour (2022–2026)

== Awards and nominations ==
Name of award ceremony, year presented, award category, nominee of award, and result of nomination
| Award ceremony | Year | Nominee(s) / Work(s) | Category | Result | Ref. |
|---|---|---|---|---|---|
| Golden Horse Awards | 2022 | Best New Performer | My Best Friend's Breakfast | Nominated | |
| Golden Horse Awards | 2022 | Best Original Film Song | "What's on Your Mind" from My Best Friend's Breakfast | Won | |
| Global Chinese Golden Chart Awards | 2015 | Best New Artist (Bronze) | Eric Chou | Won | |
| Hito Music Awards | 2015 | TV Theme Song Award | "The Distance of Love" | Won | |
| Hito Music Awards | 2016 | Most Popular New Artist (Male) | Eric Chou | Won | |
| Hito Music Awards | 2018 | friDay Digital Song | "The Chaos After You" | Won | |
| Hito Music Awards | 2018 | Most Appealing Artist | Eric Chou | Won | |
| KKBOX Music Awards | 2017 | Artist of the Year | Eric Chou | Won | |
| KKBOX Music Awards | 2019 | Artist of the Year | "The Chaos After You" | Won | |
| Sony The Bright of Music Chart Awards | 2015 | Creative Newcomer Singer and Songwriter | Eric Chou | Won | |
| Sony The Bright of Music Chart Awards | 2015 | The Most Popular K-Song Rookie Award of the Year | Eric Chou | Won | |
