= Live in the Moment (album) =

Studio album by Gin Lee
- Released: 8 September 2017
- Recorded: Avon Recording Studios, May 2017
- Genre: Cantopop
- Length: 30:25
- Language: Cantonese
- Label: Universal Music Hong Kong

Gin Lee chronology
beGin and more (2016)	Live in the Moment (2017)	Prologue (2018)

Singles from Live in the Moment
- 1. "Flight Attendant 空姐" Released: 3 April 2017; 2. "Saying Goodbye to Each Day 和每天講再見" Released: 20 June 2017; 3. "Here I Come Here I Go 隨風而來隨風而去" Released: 12 September 2017

Live in the Moment is the fourth studio album and seventh musical release by Hong Kong singer Gin Lee, released on 8 September 2017 by Universal Music Hong Kong. Live in the Moment is a concept record, with themes of focusing on the present, and its eight tracks were recorded with a live band. Its release was preceded by the release two singles, "Flight Attendant" 空姐 and "Saying Goodbye to Every Day" 和每天講再見. A third single "Come with the Wind Gone with the Wind" 隨風而來 隨風而去 was released in November. The album was certified gold (10,000 copies sold) by the Hong Kong Recording Industry Alliance (HKRIA).

In support of the album, Live in the Moment Concert held on 6 October at the Hong Kong Convention and Exhibition Centre. A special exhibit was set up at the FWD (富衛) Passion Lab in Sheung Wan, Hong Kong from 11 September to 7 October.

== Singles ==
"Flight Attendant" 空姐 was released as the first single. It reached number one on Ultimate Song Chart.

"Saying Goodbye to Everyday" 和每天講再見 was released as the second plug. The song was well received by radio stations and reached number one on the Ultimate Song Chart in early September.

"Here I Come Here I Go" 隨風而來 隨風而去 was released to radio stations in November as the album's third single. It reached number one on 903 Ultimate and RTHK in December. The song reached number one on Metro Radio in the first week of 2018.

== Track listing ==
CD
No.	Title	Lyrics	Music	Length
1.	"隨風而來 隨風而去"	梁栢堅	Christoffer Lauridsen; Ida "Lafontanie"; Christian Fast; Didrik Thott	3:06
2.	"和每天講再見"	Lin Xi	Alex Fung; Gin Lee	4:22
3.	"空姐"	林若寧	Eye Fung	3:45
4.	"今朝有酒" (Featuring C君)	C君	Shorya Sharma; Yeng Constantino	4:11
5.	"曌"	周耀輝	Derrick Sepnio; Fergus Chow	3:21
6.	"好風如水"	Pong Nan	Alex Fung	3:18
7.	"緣．兩半"	潘源良	Brian Yip	4:24
8.	"Live"	林若寧	Eric Kwok	3:55
Total length:				30:25

DVD
No.	Title	Length
1.	"和每天講再見"
2.	"空姐"
3.	"Making of..."

Christmas edition bonus CD
No.	Title	Length
1.	"和每天講再見" (with William So)
2.	"和每天講再見 (Night Remix)"

== Release history ==
Region		Format	Label	Edition(s)
Hong Kong	8 September 2017	CD + DVD, digital download	Universal Music	Standard • Deluxe
Worldwide	8 September 2017	digital download	Universal Music	Standard
Hong Kong	17 October 2017	SACD	Universal Music	1000-copy limited edition
Hong Kong	15 November 2017	Vinyl	Universal Music	1000-copy limited edition
Hong Kong	13 December 2017	2CD	Universal Music	Christmas edition
