= 988 FM =

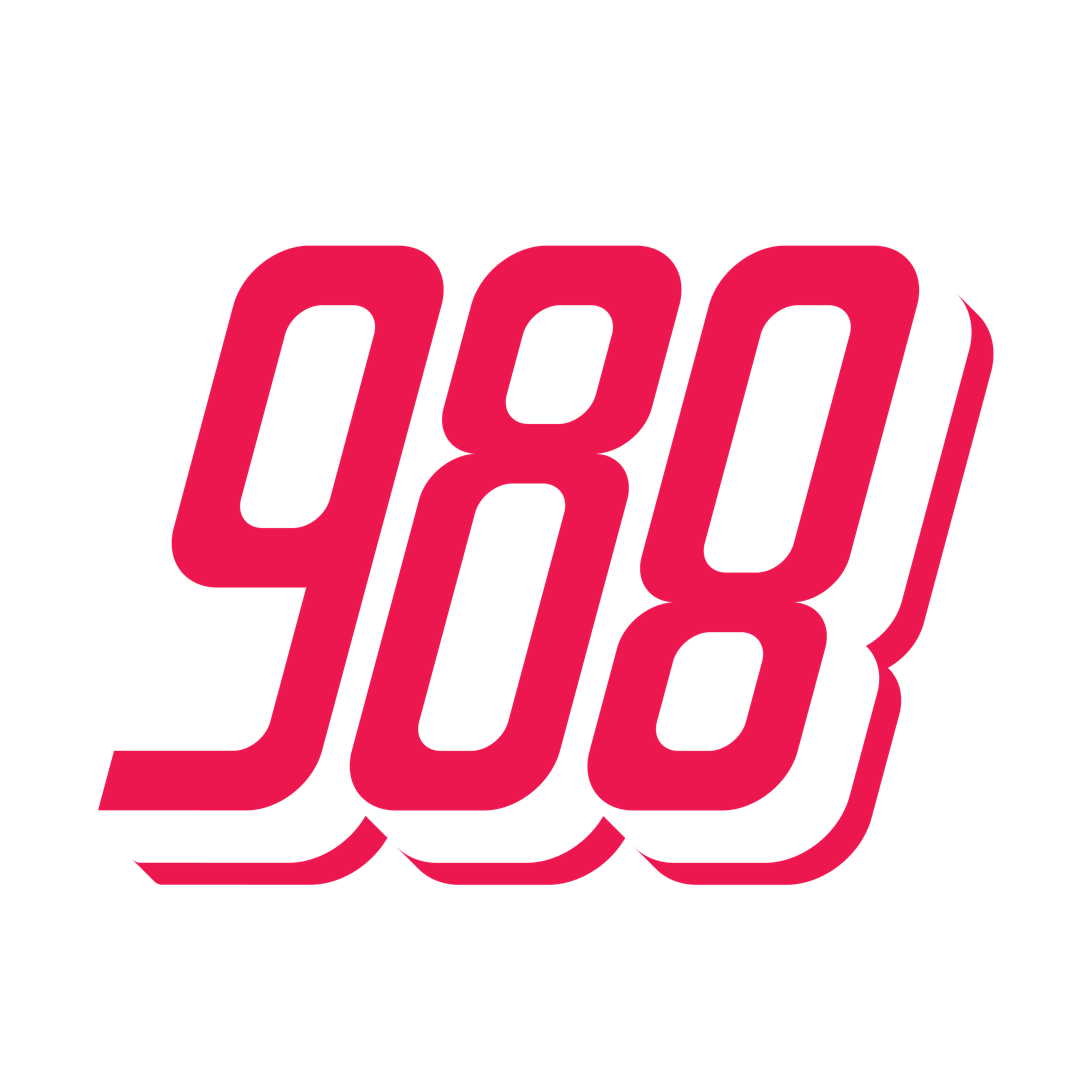
- Petaling Jaya; Malaysia
- Broadcast area: Peninsular Malaysia and Singapore
- Frequency: Varies depending on its region

Programming
- Languages: Mandarin, Cantonese
- Format: Contemporary hit (CHR), Adult contemporary (AC)
- Affiliations: Star Media Radio Group

Ownership
- Owner: Star Media Group
- Sister stations: Suria

History
- First air date: 8 May 1996; 30 years ago

Links
- Webcast: player.listenlive.co/63371
- Website: www.988.com.my

988 FM is a Malaysian Chinese-language radio station. The stations broadcast area covers West Malaysia (except Kuala Terengganu and Kota Bharu) and Singapore. The station is managed by Star Media Radio Group, a wholly owned subsidiary of Star Media Group Berhad. 988 FM began broadcasting in 1996 as a trilingual radio station, with 50% Chinese content and became a fully-fledged radio station in December 1997. The station aims to reflect and cater to the different Chinese-speaking cultures of Malaysia.

In the surveys conducted by GfK in the first half of 2022, 988 FM commanded a weekly listenership of 2.17 million. The amount contributed to 42% of listeners from the total listenership of Malaysian Chinese radio stations. The station is the number one Chinese-language station in the northern region of West Malaysia (Perak, Kedah, Penang, and Perlis).

988 FM is currently one of Malaysia's top three Chinese language radio stations, targeted at urban and suburban listeners, primarily professionals, managers, and adults. 988 FM plays the latest hits music, trends, and infotainment. 988 FM's tagline is "友声有色" (Sound of colours).

== History ==
988 FM's old logo

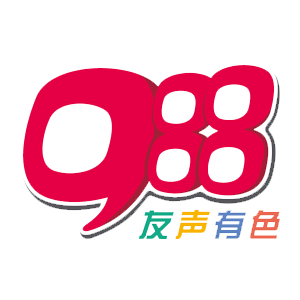
988 FM's other old logo

The radio station originates back to 4 August 1949, as the first commercial cable-transmitted radio station. In 1989, 49% of the stakes in Rediffusion was acquired by Arab-Malaysian Corporation, a company owned by Tan Sri Azman Hashim. The station changed its name to Rediffusion Radio Sdn. Bhd. in July 1991. In 1996, FM transmission was launched as a trilingual service. In December 1997, REDI-FM 98.8 was relaunched as a full-fledged Chinese radio station, ending the monopoly of the government-owned Radio 5 (now Ai FM) as the only Chinese radio station in Malaysia. At the same time, the station began 24 hour broadcasting.

The station's Klang Valley frequency 98.8 reads as "forever prosperity" in Cantonese.

By 1998, Redi FM had 1.3 million listeners and had twelve deejays based locally and from Taiwan. The station targeted the 15 to 44 age group played pop songs in Mandarin (50% in its playlist), Cantonese, and other Chinese dialects such as Hakka and Hokkien, with Cantonese dominating the playlist. The station also partnered with Commercial Radio Hong Kong for the 60-part radio drama adaptation of the film The Storm Riders and a Vox pop interview conducted by Jacky Cheung.

On 27 January 2023, 988 FM started streaming their radio webcast through YouTube live on its channel.

== Frequency ==
Frequencies	Area	Transmitter
98.8 MHz	Klang Valley	Gunung Ulu Kali
96.1 MHz	Perlis, Alor Setar, Kedah and Penang	Mount Jerai
101.0 MHz	Taiping, Perak	Bukit Larut
99.8 MHz	Ipoh, Perak	Gunung Kledang
93.3 MHz	Seremban, Negeri Sembilan	Gunung Telapak Buruk
98.2 MHz	Malacca	Mount Ledang
99.9 MHz	Johor Bahru, Johor and Singapore	Mount Pulai
90.4 MHz	Kuantan, Pahang	Bukit Pelindung

== Slogan history ==
- 友声有色 Sound Of Colours (2003–2008)
- 最好听 Best To Listen (2008–2013)
- 友声有色 Sound Of Colours (2013–2018)
- 全日Pick Up 爱哟哟 (Sept, 2018–2019)
- 坚持 • 敢言 | 坚持 • 好音乐 (2020–2022)
- 988 与你同行 988 Walk With You (Tactical theme for 25th Anniversary 2021)

== Radio Announcer ==
- Chan Fong
- Angeline Ooi
- Brandon Chan Ee Kiat
- Chrystina Ng
- Chloe Low
- Jaydern Khoo
- Danny Wan
- Cassey Soo
- Jeff Chin
- PM Wang
- Xiu Lam
- Sean Lee
- Neng Yi Qian
- Jason Poon
- Toh Harnniann
- Jiao Xuan

== Radio News Anchor ==
- Cynthia Tan
- Stephanie Yu
- Jessy Lim
- Jiao Xuan

== Former Radio Announcer ==
- Sam Mak
- Anson Kow
- May Lau
- Ng Hau Min
- Ooi Yin Yin
- Cheryl Lee
- Orange Tan
- Kyann Lim
- Jack Yap
- Nicholas Ong
- Mike Jia Yi
- Lum Sook Pheng
- KK Wong
- Leaf Lum
- Luke Loke
- Wilson Xuan
- Wong Chu Yan
- Sum Joe Hong
- Stacey Chua
- Emily Yap
- Mansson Yong
- Louise Lau
- Jiun Too
- Joycelyn Chu
- Lizz Lee
- Tay Yi Kang
- Zhen Bin
- Lee Chan Hong
