= V Chart Awards =

Chinese music awards ceremony

- Current: The 5th V Chart Awards
- Awarded for: Outstanding achievements in the music industry.
- Country: China
- First award: April 13, 2013

V Chart Awards is a music award ceremony organised by the largest independent music website in China, YinYueTai. YinYueTai is the counterpart to Billboard in United States and Gaon Charts in Korea. It aims to build a much fairer, more professional and influential music industry in China and the award to reflect the Chinese fans' love of music from different regions of the world.

== Categories ==
The beginning of the awards introduced the data category, jury category and the voting category. After the third ceremony, the award added on singer category, composition category and popular category while a techniques category was introduced in the fourth ceremony.

=== Shortlisted Criteria ===
1. The "data category" award nominees are artists who released an official MV in between January 1 and December 31 and the artist must have rankings in the chart throughout the whole year.

2. "The Most Popular Artists" series (voting category) of shortlisted nominees are the top 30 artists in the TOP100 list in all five regions.

3. "Artist Award" series nominees (singer category) are artists who released music-related work(s) in between January 1 to December 31. In addition to the results of the MV chart, the awards will be based on a combination of criteria: the standard of the released album, participation in offline activities, performances, film and television, hosting and the results that accompanies.

4. "Composition Category" award nominees are artists who released an official MV from January 1 to December 31 and the artist must have the most #1 wins in the chart throughout the whole year. "MV Awards" are based on MV production standards, word of mouth, shooting, conception, production and list of achievements to determine the winning entries.

5. "Album of The Year" is determined according to the annual album sales data ranking on the Yin Yue Shopping Mall. Shortlisted nominees are the top 10 albums on the data ranking.

6. "Jury Category" winner will have their music-related work(s) scrutinised by the senior musicians combined with the results drawn from the V Chart.

== V Chart Awards (by year) ==
Session	Year	Date	Venue	Presenters
The 1st V Chart Awards	2013	April 13	Cadillac Arena, Beijing	Mickey Huang and Ma Song
The 2nd V Chart Awards	2014	April 15	Cadillac Arena, Beijing	Li Chen, Bowie Tsang
The 3rd V Chart Awards	2015	April 11	Cadillac Arena, Beijing	Li Chen, Zhang Yu'an and Zhang Xinyue
The 4th V Chart Awards	2016	April 10	Cadillac Arena, Beijing	David Wu, Li Ai and Tao Guo
The 5th V Chart Awards	2017	April 8	Studio City, Macau	Bowie Tsang and Tao Guo

== Merit categories ==
=== Data category ===
- Top Male Artist: since 2013
- Top Female Artist: since 2013
- Top Group: since 2013
- Top New Artist: since 2013

=== Voting Category ===
- Favorite Artist: since 2013

=== Other Categories ===
(Includes Jury category, composition category, popular category and techniques category)

- Album of the Year: since 2013
- Best Singer Songwriter: since 2013
- Best Collaboration: since 2013
- All-round Artist Of The Year: since 2013
- Best Stage Performance: since 2015
- Recommended Artist Of Yinyue Tai: since 2015
- Best Director of the Year: since 2015
- Top Promising Artist: since 2014
- Top Promising Group: since 2014
- Breakthrough Male Artist Of The Year: since 2013
- Breakthrough Female Artist Of The Year: since 2013
- Hot Trend Male Artist Of The Year: since 2013
- Hot Trend Female Artist Of The Year: since 2013
- Most Popular Artist Of the Night: since 2016
- Most Popular Group Of the Night: since 2016

Defunct Awards

- Best Producer: until 2016
- Best Duet: until 2015
- Top Social Singer: until 2015
- OST of the Year: until 2015
- Indie Artist Of The Year: 2016 only
- Most Influential Artist of Asia: 2016 only
- Live Popular Artist: 2015 only
- Vanguard Musician of the Year: 2015 only
