= List of Billboard China V Chart number-one videos of 2017 =

The following is a list of the number-one music videos of 2017 on the weekly Billboard China V Chart. The chart ranks weekly most viewed music videos using data from Chinese video-sharing site YinYueTai (YYT).

== Chart history ==
| Issue date | Music video | Artist(s) | Reference |
|---|---|---|---|
| January 2 | "Release" | Timmy Xu | |
| January 9 | "Solo Show" | Wang Qing | |
| January 16 | "Solo Show" | Wang Qing | |
| January 23 | "Solo Show" | Wang Qing | |
| January 30 | "Solo Show" | Wang Qing | |
| February 6 | "Solo Show" | Wang Qing | |
| February 13 | "Solo Show" | Wang Qing | |
| February 20 | "What If I Said" | Luhan | |
| February 27 | "Roleplay (Dance Ver.)" | Luhan | |
| March 6 | "The Heroes" | Timmy Xu | |
| March 13 | "The Heroes" | Timmy Xu | |
| March 20 | "Special Beautiful Man" | Feng Jianyu | |
| March 27 | "Special Beautiful Man" | Feng Jianyu | |
| April 3 | "Special Beautiful Man" | Feng Jianyu | |
| April 10 | "Special Beautiful Man" | Feng Jianyu | |
| April 17 | "Special Beautiful Man" | Feng Jianyu | |
| April 24 | "Special Beautiful Man" | Feng Jianyu | |
| May 1 | "Li Sao" | Jackson Yi | |
| May 8 | "Noble" | Joker Xue | |
| May 15 | "Animal World" | Joker Xue | |
| May 22 | "Ambiguous Love" | Joker Xue | |
| May 29 | "Li Sao" | Jackson Yi | |
| June 5 | "Animal World" | Joker Xue | |
| June 12 | "Animal World" | Joker Xue | |
| June 19 | "I'm Afraid" | Joker Xue | |
| June 26 | "Ambiguous Love" | Joker Xue | |
| July 3 | "Set It Off" | Luhan | |
| July 10 | "Come On! AMIGO!" | TF Boys | |
| July 17 | "Come On! AMIGO!" | TF Boys | |
| July 23 | "Come On! AMIGO!" | TF Boys | |
| July 31 | "Come On! AMIGO!" | TF Boys | |
| August 7 | "Generation2" | Jackson Wang | |
| August 14 | "Generation2" | Jackson Wang | |
| August 21 | "In The Name of My Faith" | TF Boys | |
| August 28 | "Papillon" | Jackson Wang | |
| September 4 | "Numb" | Will Pan | |
| September 11 | "Papillon" | Jackson Wang | |
| September 18 | "Numb" | Will Pan | |
| September 25 | "Numb" | Will Pan | |
| October 2 | "Numb" | Will Pan | |
| October 9 | "Numb" | Will Pan | |
| October 16 | "Numb" | Will Pan | |
| October 23 | "Numb" | Will Pan | |
| October 30 | "Numb" | Will Pan | |
| November 6 | "Lay 02 Sheep" | Zhang Yixing | |
| November 13 | "It's Always You" | Timmy Xu | |
| November 20 | "It's Always You" | Timmy Xu | |
| November 27 | OKAY | Jackson Wang | |
| December 4 | OKAY | Jackson Wang | |
| December 11 | OKAY | Jackson Wang | |
| December 18 | Sleep | Roy Wang | |
| December 25 | Sleep | Roy Wang | |
