= The 4th V Chart Awards =

2016 Chinese music awards ceremony

- Date: April 10, 2016
- Location: Cadillac Arena, Beijing
- Hosted by: David Wu, Li Ai, Tao Guo
- Website: vchart.yinyuetai.com/awards2016/winnerlist

The 4th V Chart Awards (第四届音悦V榜年度盛典) is a music awards hosted by YinYueTai in 2016 at Cadillac Arena, Beijing. The emcee for the awards were David Wu, Li Ai and Tao Guo.

== Shortlisted criteria ==
1. The "data-based category" award nominees are artists who released an official MV in between January 1, 2016, to December 31, 2016, and the artist must be ranked in the chart throughout the whole year.
2. "The Most Popular Artists" series of shortlisted nominees are the top 30 artists in the TOP100 list in all five regions.
3. "Artist Award" series nominees are artists who released music-related work(s) in between January 2016 to December 31, 2016. In addition to the results of the MV chart, the awards will be based on a combination of criteria: the standard of the released album, participation in offline activities, performances, film and television, hosting and the results that accompanies.
4. "Composition Category" award nominees are artists who released an official MV from January 1, 2016, to December 31, 2016, and the artist must have the most #1 wins in the chart throughout the whole year. "MV Awards" are based on MV production standards, word of mouth, shooting, conception, production and list of achievements to determine the winning entries.
5. "Album of The Year" is determined according to the annual album sales data ranking on the Yin Yue Shopping Mall 2016. Shortlisted nominees are the top 10 albums on the data ranking.

== Voting ==
On February 5, 2016, the award ceremony was officially launched. On February 29, the nominees for the "Favourite Artist of the Year" series was announced. Voting of the first phase of nominees commenced on March 7 and ended on March 19. On the March 8, a concept video was released. On March 21, the voting for the second phase of the "Favourite Artist of the Year" ended on April 5.

== Cinematography ==
The presentation of the ceremony used live webcast technology which divided into Live HD and a 360-degree panorama live accompanied with three interfaces for the backstage live. Live broadcast has a choice of standard definition and HD to choose from. The 360-degree panoramic live technology facilitates live performances from different angles. Backstage live showcases interviews with various artists who are present.

== Personnel ==
=== Host ===
YinYueTai

=== Official Broadcasting Site ===
StarTV YinYueTai

=== Data provider ===
YinYueTai Mobile App, YinYueTai PC App, YinYueTai Official Website, Baidu

=== Interworking Partners ===
Billboard, Gaon Charts

=== Collaboration Partners ===
Hunan Broadcasting System, Dragon TV, Sohu TV, KpopStars, Baidu, Miaopai by MeituPic and more.

== Winners and nominees ==
Singer Category (歌手类)
Top Male Artist	Top Female Artist
Luhan - Medals	Li Yunchun - "混蛋，我想你" (Idiot, I Miss You)
From other regions: JJ Lin - HK & Taiwan; Justin Bieber - Western; Jang Hyun Seung - Korea; Akanishi Jin - Japan	From other regions: G.E.M. - HK & Taiwan; Taylor Swift - Western; Hahm Eun Jung - Korea; Ayumi Hamasaki - Japan
Top Group	Top New Artist
TFBoys - Adore	Wang Qing & Feng Jianyu
From other regions: Sodagreen - HK & Taiwan; Maroon 5 - Western; T-ara - Korea; AKB48 - Japan	From other regions: Yoyo Sham - HK & Taiwan; Sam Smith - Western; GFriend - Korea; lol - Japan
Top Promising Artist	Breakthrough Artist Of The Year
UNIQ; SpeXial; Tomomi Kasai	Chi YueHan; Vivi Jiang; EXID
Hot Trend Artist Of The Year	Indie Artist Of The Year
Joker Xue; Will Pan; Jessica Jung; Tomomi Itano	Peng Dan (彭坦); Chen Li; Guba Ahsan (贾巴阿叁)
Best Singer Songwriter Of The Year	All-round Artist Of The Year
Silence Wang; Kenji Wu	Joker Xue
Most Influential Artist of Asia	BRC Artist of the Year
Li Yunchun	G.E.M.
Recommended Artist of Yinyue Tai
Li Yunchun
Works Category (作品类)
Best OST／The Annual Film Songs	The Best Cooperation Of The Year
Alan Dawa Dolma - "Through the Ages" (千古) (The Journey of Flower); Zhang Yixing (Lay) - "Alone" (一个人) (Ex-Files 2)	M.I.C. Steelo ft. Shen MengChen - "Dying To See You"; Kenji Wu ft. Song Ji Hyo - "Neo gwi yeop da" (你好可爱/너 귀엽다)
Best Stage Performance of the Year	Best Album of The Year
VIXX; Will Pan; Li Yunchun	Luhan - Reloaded; EXO - Exodus; Eason Chan - Getting Ready
Popularity Award (人气类）
Most Popular Artist Of The Night
Wang Qing & Feng Jianyu
Favorite Artist Of The Year
Wang Qing & Feng Jianyu
From other regions: G.E.M.; Avril Lavigne; Baekhyun; Akanishi Jin
Best Producer	Best Director
PSY	Yeap Shaohu - "小镇青年"; Muh Chen - I'm Not Yours; Mika Ninagawa - "さよなら,アリス"

== Wardrobe Malfunctions ==
G.E.M. suffered a wardrobe malfunction which caused her to fell on stage. Luhan was seen with a running nose which he later explained himself to be having rhinitis during the backstage interview.
