= The 5th V Chart Awards =

2017 Chinese music awards ceremony

- Date: April 8, 2017
- Location: Studio City, Macau
- Hosted by: Tao Guo, Bowie Tsang
- Website: vchart.yinyuetai.com/awards2017/honour

The 5th V Chart Awards (第五届音悦V榜年度盛典) is a music awards hosted by YinYueTai on April 8, 2017 at Studio City, Macau. The emcee for the award were Bowie Tsang and Tao Guo.

== Shortlisted Criteria ==
1. The "data-based category" award nominees are artists who released an official MV in between January 1, 2017 to December 31, 2017 and the artist must be ranked in the chart throughout the whole year.

2. "The Most Popular Artists" series of shortlisted nominees are the top 30 artists in the TOP100 list in all five regions.

3. "Artist Award" series nominees are artists who released music-related work(s) in between January 2017 to December 31, 2017. In addition to the results of the MV chart, the awards will be based on a combination of criteria: the standard of the released album, participation in offline activities, performances, film and television, hosting and the results that accompanies.

4. "Composition Category" award nominees are artists who released an official MV from January 1, 2017 to December 31, 2017 and the artist must have the most #1 wins in the chart throughout the whole year. "MV Awards" are based on MV production standards, word of mouth, shooting, conception, production and list of achievements to determine the winning entries.

5. "Album of The Year" is determined according to the annual album sales data ranking on the Yin Yue Shopping Mall 2017. Shortlisted nominees are the top 10 albums on the data ranking.

== Personnel ==
=== Host ===
YinYueTai

=== Official Broadcasting Site ===
StarTV YinYueTai

=== Data provider ===
YinYueTai Mobile App, YinYueTai PC App, YinYueTai Official Website, Baidu

=== Interworking Partners ===
Billboard, Gaon Charts

=== Collaboration Partners ===
Hunan Broadcasting System, Dragon TV, Sohu TV, KpopStars, Baidu, Miaopai by MeituPic and more.

== Voting ==
On February 24, nominees for the "Favourite Artist of the Year" were announced. On March 7, the first phase of the "Favourite Artist of the Year" series of polls began. A complete list of the winners was published on the official website on the following day after the award ceremony ended.

== Winners and nominees ==
Awards in white are major awards.

Data-based Category (数 据 类)& Artist Award (艺人类)
Top Male Artist	Top Female Artist
Zhang Yixing (Lay) - Lose Control	Li Yunchun - Sense of Presence
From other regions: Jay Chou - HK & Taiwan; Justin Bieber - Western; Kim Jaejoong - Korea; Akanishi Jin - Japan	From other regions: Angela Chang - HK & Taiwan; Taylor Swift - Western; Hyomin - Korea; Namie Amuro - Japan
Top Group	Top New Artist
TFBoys - Protecting Home	Xu Weizhou
From other regions: Mayday - HK & Taiwan; 21 Pilots - Western; T-ara - Korea; AKB48 - Japan	From other regions: Erika - HK & Taiwan; Troye Sivan - Western; NCT 127 - Korea; Keyakizaka46 - Japan
Best All Rounded Artist of the Year	Baidu Most Searched Artist of The Year
William Chan; Huang Zitao	Angela Chang
Best Stage Performance	Hot Trend Group Of The Year
BTS	VIXX
Best Singer Songwriter of The Year	Hot Trend Male Artist of The Year
Zhao Yongxin	Wang Qing
Breakthrough Male Artist of The Year	Hot Trend Female Artist of The Year
Hooleeger	Vivi Jiang
Breakthrough Female Artist of The Year	Recommended Artist of YinYueTai
Meng Jia	Prachaya Ruangroj (Singto) & Perawat Sangpotirat (Krist)
Top Promising Group	Top Promising Artist
NCT DREAM	Wang Bowen
Composition Category (作 品 类)
Best Album Of The Year	The Best Cooperation Of The Year
Zhang Yixing (Lay) - Lose Control; Joker Xue - Beginner	Yuan Shanshan & Chanyeol - "I Hate You"
Best Songwriter of The Year	Best MV Director of The Year
Xu Liang - Singer	Huang Pingzhong (黄中平) - Beginner; ziv (叶少琥) - Happiness
Voting Category (投 票 类)
Most Popular Artist Of The Night
Sehun; ATF (Group)
Favorite Artist Of The Year
Wang Qing
From other regions: Taylor Swift; Chanyeol; Akanishi Jin; JJ Lin
Most Popular New Group	Most Popular New Artist
NCT 127	Prachaya Ruangroj (Singto)

== Performances ==
Artist	Performed	Ref.
EXO	Lotto, Monster	
Angela Chang	Not Afraid, Invisible Wings	
Xu Liang	The Person who write the lyrics	
Silence Wang	Love O2O	

== Controversies ==
The award night falls in conjunction with EXO's five year anniversary. Due to time restraints, EXO only performed two out of the initially planned four songs which brought displeasure to the crowds. At the last 20 minutes of voting for the "Most Popular Artist Of The Night" award, girl group ATF had an abrupt spike of votes, turning the tables on EXO which caused much disorder among the audience present.

In April 2023, Yinyuetai posted an apology letter to EXO and EXO-Ls for rigging EXO’s awards. "On the voting night, EXO has always been the leader in the most anticipated 'Most Popular Artist of The Night' at that time. But in the last few minutes, several account represent a certain girl group invested hundreds of thousands of dollars in an instant. Override the result."
