= Wang Qing =

Wang Qing is the name of:

- Wang Qing (Water Margin), fictional Song dynasty rebel leader from the Chinese novel Water Margin
- Qing Wang (academic), Chinese-born British professor at Warwick Business School
- Wang Qing (actor) (born 1993), Chinese actor, singer and host

== See also ==
- Wangqing County, Jilin, China
