= Feng Jianyu =

Chinese actor and singer

- Born: August 27, 1992 (age 33); Heilongjiang, China
- Education: Beijing Union University
- Occupations: Actor, singer
- Years active: 2015–present

Chinese name
- Chinese: 冯建宇
Transcriptions
Standard Mandarin
- Hanyu Pinyin: Féng Jiànyǔ
- Website: http://weibo.com/u/5607826030

Feng Jianyu (born August 27, 1992 in Heilongjiang) is a Chinese actor and singer. He portrayed the role of Wu Suowei in the web series Counterattack in May 2015, and entered into the public eye. On September 22, 2015, he collaborated with co-star Wang Qing and released the song This Summer. He portrayed Tu Youyou in the web movie Approaching Journey. In June 2016, he released his first EP Red. In July 2016, he played a lead role in the film Infinite Fight.

== Life and career ==
=== Life ===
Feng Jianyu was born in Heilongjiang. He graduated from Beijing Union University, majoring in acting. In his junior year, he was invited by Wang Qing, who is his lover and classmate of 4 years, to star in a web series.

=== Career ===
==== Film ====
Feng Jianyu began his career playing the role of Wu Suowei in the web series Counterattack that was released in August 2015. In September 2015, he participated in the filming of Counterattack's special episode.

In March 2016, he played one of the two leading roles in the web film Approaching Journey. In July 2016, he co-starred with Wang Qing in the web movie Infinite Fight. The movie was nominated for seven awards in the World Chinese Science Fiction Movies Nebula Awards.

==== Music ====
On September 22, 2015, Feng Jianyu collaborated with Wang Qing and released the song This Summer. This Summer ranked No.1 on the Fresh Asia Weekly Charts for four consecutive weeks and also ranked first on the October monthly chart. This Summer also set a record of 460,000 digital copies sold on Sina Weibo. He co-starred with Wang Qing in the music video and short film of This Summer. This Summer music video ranked No.4 in YinYueTai 2015 Mainland TOP 100. Feng Jianyu held three fan meetings for "This Summer" with Wang Qing, in Tianjin, Chengdu and Shenzhen. This Summer won the "Most Popular Collaboration" in the 16th Top Chinese Music Annual Festival.

He also performed the theme song of Approaching Journey which bears the same name. On May 15, 2016, the digital single Approaching Journey was released and sold exclusively on KuGou Music. After just two days, it achieved the title of the platinum record, over 100,000 digital copies sold on KuGou Music. Later in July 2016, he released his first EP Red. The first single in that EP, which is the title track Red, was released on June 16.

==== Hosting ====
In March 2016, Feng Jianyu co-hosted the 2nd KU Music Asian Music Awards red carpet show with Wang Qing. This was the first time he tried hosting.

== Discography ==
=== EPs ===
Year	English title	Chinese title	Note
2016	Red	红	

=== Singles ===
Year	English title	Chinese title	Notes
2015	This Summer	今夏	with Wang Qing
2016	Approaching Journey	一路向南	Theme song of Approaching Journey
2016	Rhapsody	狂想	
2016	Steel Forest	钢铁森林	Promotional song of Breaking Dawn
2017	My Lady Boy Friends	不一样的美男子	Soundtrack of Special Beautiful Man
2018	Losing Importance	失重	Soundtrack of Youth
2019	Let Go and Battle	放手一搏	Soundtrack of Breaking Dawn

== Filmography ==
=== Film ===
Year	English title	Chinese title	Role	Notes
2016	Approaching Journey	一路向南	Tu Youyou	
2016	Infinite Fight	无限斗界之暗夜双龙	Chen Yang/Sparrow	

=== Television series ===
Year	English title	Chinese title	Role	Notes
2015	Counterattack	逆袭之爱上情敌	Wu Suowei	
2017	Men with Sword 2	刺客列传2	Zuo Yi	
2018	Patriot	爱国者	Chen Siyuan	
2019	The Chosen Ones	诡使神差	Xiao Yi	
2019	The Legend of White Snake	新白娘子传奇	Zhang Yutang	
2019	Breaking Dawn	晨阳	Shen Yu	
2020	The Journey Across the Night	我在香港遇见他	Xiao Xi	
2025	ABO Desire	垂涎	Chang Yu	

=== Host ===
Year	English title	Chinese title	Notes
2016	KU Music Asian Music Awards	酷音乐亚洲盛典	Co-host of the Red Carpet Show

== Awards and nominations ==
- Music Awards Ceremony

Year	Award	Category	Nominated work	Result	Ref
2016	KuGou Fanxing Annual Festival	Most Influential Artist of the Year		Won	
2016	KU Music Asian Music Awards	Most Popular Artist		Won	
2016	Top Chinese Music Awards	Most Popular Collaboration	This Summer	Won	
2016	V Chart Awards	Top New Artist – Mainland	This Summer	Won	
2016	V Chart Awards	Favorite Artist of the Year – Mainland	This Summer	Won	
2016	V Chart Awards	Most Popular Artist of the Night	This Summer	Won	
2016	Freshasia Music Awards	Most Popular Song of the Year	This Summer	Won	
2016	Jin Ge Wang Music Awards	Favorite Artist of the Year – Mainland	Red	Won	
2016	Jin Ge Wang Music Awards	Top New Artist	Red	Won	
2016	Mobile Video FY Festival	Most Influential Artist of the Year		Won	

- Music Program Awards

Year	Award	Category	Nominated work	Result	Ref
2016	Global Chinese Music Program Awards	Champion	Red	Won	
2016	AiBB Asian idol Music Program Awards	Champion	Red	Won	
