= Faceu =

Camera app for smartphones

FaceU (Chinese: 激萌) is a camera app for smartphones running Android or Apple iOS that edits portrait photographs, typically selfies. This app uses AR technology to allow users to add stickers or effects in real-time when taking selfies and videos. It was launched in 2016 and had 250 million registered users in 2017. Most of the users of Faceu are females from 15 to 35 years old. In February 2018, Faceu was acquired by Chinese media startup Toutiao, which is worth about $300 million. The app was banned in India (along with other Chinese apps) on 2 September 2020 by the government, the move came amid the 2020 China-India skirmish.

== Online marketing ==
FaceU is one of several selfie camera apps in China, including MeituPic, Pitu, and Camera360. The app includes social functions such as instant messaging and video chat. Photos and short videos are deleted after a short period. . FaceU has worked with brands to create themed stickers for social media campaigns. In 2016, Faceu collaborated with MeituPic's Meipai and launched a rainbow effect. In October 2017, during the Mid-Autumn Festival and National Day, FaceU released a feature that applied historical or military costumes to selfies. The app has also worked with various social media personalities and celebrities, who have posted content using FaceU effects. Faceu group engages users' emotions utilizing key opinion leaders (KOL) and posters on social media.

== Usage and Demographics ==
FaceU had a large user base. According to industry sources, the app had more than 90 million monthly active users (MAU) and over 11 million daily active users (DAU) at certain points. Most of the users were under 30 and mainly women. The app was especially popular in major Chinese cities like Beijing, Shanghai, and Guangzhou. FaceU also caught on in other parts of East Asia, particularly Japan and South Korea. Some app stores claim the app had hundreds of millions of users worldwide, but these numbers mostly come from the company’s marketing materials and have not been confirmed by independent sources.

== Product Features ==
FaceU includes face recognition and live augmented reality (AR) effects. It allows users to add filters and stickers in real time while they are recording, rather than having to apply them later. The app integrates beauty filters, tools to create emojis and GIFs, and follow-video functionality that automatically tracks the face and movements as it records. Studies and market reports indicate that augmented reality (AR) filters and beautification tools are now common in smartphone photography. These features have influenced the way people take photos and what they expect photos to look like when shared online. Adding AR filters and beautification options has become a standard feature that most mobile photography apps now include.
