= The 3rd V Chart Awards =

2015 Chinese music awards ceremony

- Date: April 11, 2015
- Location: Cadillac Arena, Beijing
- Hosted by: Li Chen, Zhang Yu'an and Zhang Xinyue
- Website: vchart.yinyuetai.com/awards2015/winnerlist

The 3rd V Chart Awards (第三届音悦V榜年度盛典) is a music awards hosted by YinYueTai on April 11, 2015 at Cadillac Arena, Beijing. The emcee for the award were Li Chen, Zhang Yu'an and Zhang Xinyue. The awards was broadcast on Shenzhen Television.

== Shortlisted criteria ==
1. The "data-based category" award nominees are artists who released an official MV in between January 1, 2015 to December 31, 2015 and the artist must be ranked in the chart throughout the whole year.
2. "The Most Popular Artists" series of shortlisted nominees are the top 30 artists in the TOP100 list in all five regions.
3. "Artist Award" series nominees are artists who released music-related work(s) in between January 2015 to December 31, 2015. In addition to the results of the MV chart, the awards will be based on a combination of criteria: the standard of the released album, participation in offline activities, performances, film and television, hosting and the results that accompanies.
4. "Composition Category" award nominees are artists who released an official MV from January 1, 2015 to December 31, 2015 and the artist must have the most #1 wins in the chart throughout the whole year. "MV Awards" are based on MV production standards, word of mouth, shooting, conception, production and list of achievements to determine the winning entries.
5. "Album of The Year" is determined according to the annual album sales data ranking on the Yin Yue Shopping Mall 2015. Shortlisted nominees are the top 10 albums on the data ranking.

== Personnel ==
=== Host ===
YinYueTai

=== Official Broadcasting Site ===
StarTV YinYueTai

=== Data provider ===
YinYueTai Mobile App, YinYueTai PC App, YinYueTai Official Website, Baidu

=== Interworking Partners ===
Billboard, Gaon Charts

=== Collaboration Partners ===
Hunan Broadcasting System, Dragon TV, Sohu TV, KpopStars, Baidu, Miaopai by MeituPic and more.

== Voting ==
On March 4, 2015, The 3rd V Chart Awards was officially launched. On March 5, nominees for the "Favourite Artist of the Year" were announced. On the 9th, the first phase of the "Favourite Artist of the Year" series of polls began and voting ended on the 20th. A complete list of the winners was published on the official website on the subsequent day (March 12) of the award ceremony (March 11).

== Winners and nominees ==
Singer Category (歌手类)
Top Male Artists	Top Female Artists
Vision Wei - By Your Side	Jane Zhang - You Are Mine (我是我的)
From other regions: JJ Lin - HK & Taiwan; Pitbull - Western; Taeyang - Korea; Akanishi Jin - Japan	From other regions: Jolin Tsai - HK & Taiwan; Taylor Swift - Western; Park Ji-yeon - Korea; Namie Amuro - Japan
Top Groups	Top New Artists
Top Combine - Large Pear (鸭梨大)	Henry Huo
From other regions: Mayday - HK & Taiwan; One Direction - Western; f(x) - Korea; AKB48 - Japan	From other regions: Pets Tseng - HK & Taiwan; Sam Smith - Western; GOT7 - Korea; Mariya Nishiuchi - Japan
Top Promising Artists	Hot Trend Artists Of The Year
Boyfriend; Flower; Christopher; Jason (from NU'EST)	May J; TFBoys; Aarif Lee; T-ara
Breakthrough Artists Of The Year	Best MV Directors
Zhao Yongxin; Tomomi Itano	ziv; Zoe
Best Singer Songwriters Of The Year	All-round Artists Of The Year
Xu Song; Bii	Vision Wei; Rainie Yang
Best Stage Interpretation	Best Producers
Epik High	JJ Lin; Li Ronghao
Recommended Artists of Yinyue Tai
Li Ronghao; Guess What (Band)
Works Category (作品类)
Best OST／The Annual Film Songs	Best Cooperation Of The Year
Luhan - "Our Tomorrow" (我們的明天) (20 Once Again); G.E.M - "The Continent" (后会无期) (The Continent)	Qi Wei ft. Lee Seung-hyun - "Lucky Lucky"; Rainie Yang ft. Ariel Lin- "We Deserve Happiness"
Best Music Videos of the Year	Best Albums of The Year
2NE1 - "Come Back Home"; Angela Chang - "Bandage"; Taylor Swift - "Blank Space"; Akanishi Jin - "Mi Amor"	Jane Zhang - 7th Sense; EXO - Overdose; Jolin Tsai - Play
Popularity Award (人气类）
Vanguard Musician of the Night
Vision Wei
Favorite Artists Of The Year
TFBoys
From other regions: Taylor Swift; T-ara; AKB48; Pets Tseng
Live Popular Singer
TFBoys

All winners and nominees are sourced from the organization's official website.
