= Ice hockey at the 2022 Winter Olympics – Women's tournament final =

2022 Winter Olympic women's ice hockey final
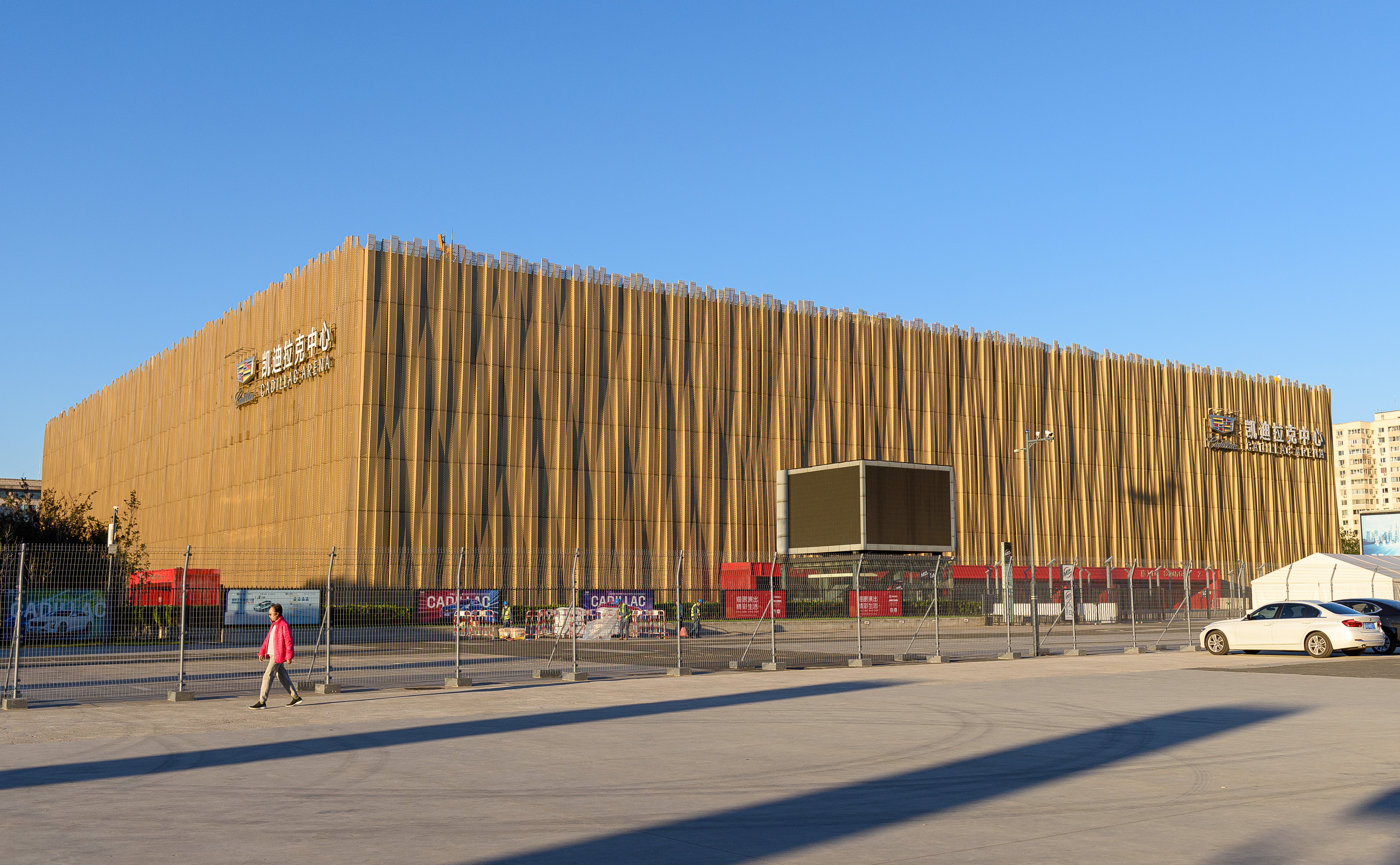
- Wukesong Arena in Beijing hosted the final.
| | 1 | 2 | 3 | Total |
|---|---|---|---|---|
| Canada | 2 | 1 | 0 | 3 |
| United States | 0 | 1 | 1 | 2 |
- Date: 12 February 2022
- Arena: Wukesong Arena
- City: Beijing

The 2022 Winter Olympic ice hockey gold medal match was an ice hockey match held on 17 February 2022 at Wukesong Arena in Beijing, China, between title holders the United States and reigning World Champions Canada to determine the winners of women's ice hockey tournament at the 2022 Winter Olympics.

Canada won the match 3–2 securing a record-extending fifth Olympic title overall.

== Background ==
Both teams entered the tournament as the reigning champions of either the Ice hockey at the Olympic Games tournament (United States) or the IIHF Women's World Championship (Canada).

== Route to the final ==
=== Canada ===
Canada's route to the final
| Match | Opponent | Result |
|---|---|---|
| 1 | Switzerland | 12–1 |
| 2 | Finland | 11–1 |
| 3 | ROC | 6–1 |
| 4 | United States | 4–2 |
| QF | Sweden | 11–0 |
| SF | Switzerland | 10–3 |

Canada qualified for the tournament by being ranked in the top six following the 2020 Women's Ice Hockey World Championships.

=== United States ===
United States' route to the final
| Match | Opponent | Result |
|---|---|---|
| 1 | Finland | 5–2 |
| 2 | ROC | 5–0 |
| 3 | Switzerland | 8–0 |
| 4 | Canada | 2–4 |
| QF | Czech Republic | 4–1 |
| SF | Finland | 4–1 |

The United States also qualified by placing in the top six.

== Match ==
=== Details ===
| 17 February 2022; 12:10 | Canada | 3–2 (2–0, 1–1, 0–1) | United States | Wukesong Arena, Beijing; Attendance: 834 |

Game reference

Ann-Renee Desbiens
Goalies
Alex Cavallini
Referees:
(United States) Kelly Cooke
(Switzerland) Anna Wiegand
Linesmen:
(Sweden) Anna Hammar
(United States) Kendall Hanley

| Nurse (Thompson, Poulin) – 07:50 | 1–0 |
| Poulin – 15:02 | 2–0 |
| Poulin (Jenner, Nurse) – 29:08 | 3–0 |
| | 3–1 | 36:39 – Knight (Brandt) (SH) |
| | 3–2 | 59:47 – Kessel (Roque, Carpenter) (PP, EA) |

6 min
Penalties
4 min
21
Shots
40
