= Ramón Martínez (infielder) =

American baseball player (born 1972)

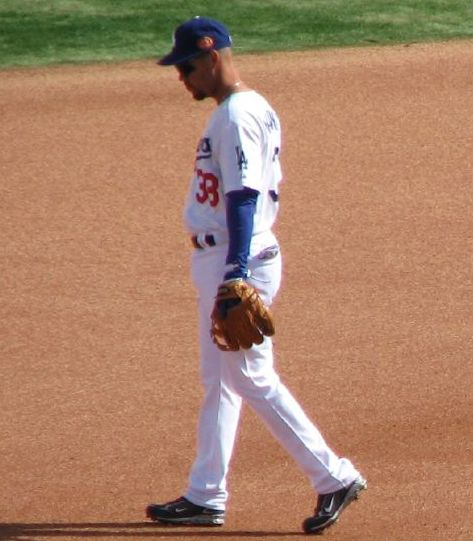
- Martínez during the MLB China Series in 2008
- Infielder
- Born: October 10, 1972 (age 53); Philadelphia, Pennsylvania, U.S.
- Batted: Right Threw: Right

MLB debut
- June 20, 1998, for the San Francisco Giants

Last MLB appearance
- June 2, 2009, for the New York Mets

MLB statistics
- Batting average: .262
- Home runs: 29
- Runs batted in: 242
- Stats at Baseball Reference

Teams
- San Francisco Giants (1998–2002); Chicago Cubs (2003–2004); Detroit Tigers (2005); Philadelphia Phillies (2005); Los Angeles Dodgers (2006–2007); New York Mets (2008–2009)

Ramón E. Martínez (born October 10, 1972) is an American former Major League Baseball utility infielder.

== Early career ==
Martínez graduated from Escuela Superior Catolica High School and then attended Vernon Regional Junior College in Texas, where he played baseball and graduated in 1992. He was signed as an undrafted free agent by the Kansas City Royals on January 15, 1993.

== Professional career ==
=== Kansas City Royals ===
Martínez made his professional baseball debut with the Gulf Coast Royals in the rookie leagues in 1993 and rose through the Royals farm system with stops in Wilmington, Wichita, and Omaha.

=== San Francisco Giants ===
On December 9, 1996, Martínez was traded by the Royals to the San Francisco Giants for Jamie Brewington. He played with the Giants Double-A team in Shreveport and Triple-A teams in Phoenix and Fresno before finally getting his first shot at the big leagues.

Martínez made his major league debut on June 20, 1998, as the starting second baseman for the Giants against the San Diego Padres. He went 3 for 3 in his debut, with his first hit being a single off Mark Langston. He was the first Giant since Willie McCovey to register at least 3 hits in his first Major League game.

He remained on the Giants roster through 2002. The Giants used him as a utility player primarily, with occasional starts at second, shortstop or third.

=== Chicago Cubs ===
He left the Giants as a free agent following the 2002 season and signed with the Chicago Cubs, where he was their top infield reserve/pinch hitter for two seasons.

=== Detroit Tigers/Philadelphia Phillies ===
Martínez started the 2005 season with the Detroit Tigers and was traded on June 9 to the Philadelphia Phillies alongside Ugueth Urbina for infielder Plácido Polanco. He hit. 286 for the Phillies, who used him as their backup first baseman. Ramon's only home run with the Phillies was a grand slam off Horacio Ramírez on September 14, 2005, in a 12-4 Phillies win.

=== Los Angeles Dodgers ===
Martínez signed with the Los Angeles Dodgers prior to the 2006 season and spent the next two seasons as a utility player for the Dodgers, playing solidly in 2006 during injuries to starting second baseman Jeff Kent. His option was not picked up by the club after the 2007 season, but on January 29, 2008, they signed him to a minor league deal with an invitation to spring training. He wound up assigned to the minor league Las Vegas 51s to start the 2008 season, but was injured and spent several months on the DL.

=== New York Mets ===
He eventually returned to the 51s, but was released by the Dodgers on July 24 and was signed by the New York Mets to a minor league deal. He was called up late in the 2008 season. Martinez signed a minor league deal to rejoin the Mets on February 13, 2009.
