= The 2nd V Chart Awards =

2014 Chinese music awards ceremony

- Date: April 15, 2014
- Location: Cadillac Arena, Beijing
- Hosted by: Li Chen, Bowie Tsang
- Website: vchart.yinyuetai.com/awards2014/winners

The 2nd V Chart Awards (第二届音悦V榜年度盛典) is a music awards hosted by YinYueTai on April 15, 2014 at Cadillac Arena, Beijing. The emcee for the award were Li Chen and Bowie Tsang.

== Shortlisted criteria ==
1. The "data-based category" award nominees are artists who released an official MV in between January 1, 2014 to December 31, 2014 and the artist must be ranked in the chart throughout the whole year.
2. "The Most Popular Artists" series in the "voting category" of shortlisted nominees are the top 30 artists in the TOP150 list in all five regions.
3. "Jury category" nominees are shortlisted artists based on the year-long results of the China Billboard V Chart and the nominees will go through a panel of senior musicians.

== Website ==
On the main section of the official website for The 2nd V Chart Awards, the official website of the award ceremony added the review section of the festival (which is the first time YinYueTai is doing so), news commentary and the video canvassing area for fans. Users can not only express their opinions, but also interact through games and interactions. Exchanges and interaction among various fandoms and other forums are set to understand the festival's dynamics and voting process, and the official website facilitates various fandoms to canvassing support to their singer.

== Personnel ==
=== Host ===
YinYueTai

=== Data provider ===
YinYueTai Mobile App, YinYueTai PC App, YinYueTai Official Website, Baidu

=== Interworking Partners ===
Billboard, Gaon Charts

== Voting ==
On March 1, 2014, The 2nd V Chart Awards was officially launched. Promotional posters were released online on March 11. On March 17, the first phase of the "Favourite Artist of the Year" series of polls began and ended on the 26th. The second phase of the "Favourite Artist of the Year" series of polls commenced from March 30 till April 8. A complete list of the attendees was announced on April 5.

== Winners and nominees ==
Data-based Category (数据类)
| Top Male Artist | Top Female Artist |
|---|---|
| Vision Wei - Cover the lover | Bibi Zhou - Jealousy |
| From other regions: JJ Lin - HK & Taiwan; Justin Timberlake - Western; G-Dragon - Korea; Ryosuke Yamada - Japan | From other regions: Hebe Tien - HK & Taiwan; Avril Lavigne - Western; CL (from 2NE1) - Korea; Tomomi Itano - Japan |
| Top Group | Top New Artist |
| M.I.C. - Single Ladies | SNH48 |
| From other regions: Mayday - HK & Taiwan; One Direction - Western; CNBLUE & Super Junior - Korea; AKB48 - Japan | From other regions: Michelle Chen - HK & Taiwan; Lorde - Western; BTS - Korea; kaho - Japan |
Jury Category (评委会类)
| Top Promising Artist | Top Social Singer |
| Coke Lee | Aarif Lee |
| Breakthrough Artist Of The Year | Hot Trend Artist Of The Year |
| Yuexin Wang; An Youqi; Where Chou; Power Station | Moraynia Liu; G.E.M.; M.I.C.; Bii |
| Best Duet | Best Singer Songwriter Of The Year |
| Cao Xuanbin ft. Baby Zhang - Singing When We Are Young; Jing Wen Tseng ft Christine Fan - Thousand Years | Joker Xue; JJ Lin |
| All-round Artist Of The Year | Best Cooperation Of The Year |
| Christine Fan | Aarif Lee and Fan Bingbing |
| Popular Artist of YinyueTai | Best Music Micro Movie |
| TFBoys | Qi Wei - THE LOST (失窃之物) (戚薇音乐微电影) |
| Top Indie Artist | Top Influential Artist |
| Ling Kai; Li Ronghao; Kurukawa; David Cui | Li Yunchun; JJ Lin |
| Best MV Director | Best Producer |
| Bill Chia | Hanjin Tan; Shang Wenjie |
| Best Music Video of the Year | Best Album of The Year |
| Kim Jaejoong - just another girl; G-Dragon - Coup D'etat; Taylor Swift - 22 | Bibi Zhou - Unlock; EXO - XOXO; Super Junior M - Break Down; JJ Lin - Stories Untold; Hebe Tien - Insignificance |
Voting Category (投票类）
Favorite Artist Of The Year
TFBoys
From other regions: Hebe Tien - HK & Taiwan; Justin Bieber - Western; Super Junior - Korea; Ryosuke Yamada - Japan
