= The 1st V Chart Awards =

2013 Chinese music awards ceremony

- Date: April 13, 2013
- Location: Cadillac Arena, Beijing
- Hosted by: Mickey Huang and Ma Song
- Website: [ http://vchart.yinyuetai.com/awards2013 vchart.yinyuetai.com/awards2013]

The 1st V Chart Awards (第一届音悦V榜年度盛典) is a Chinese music awards hosted by YinYueTai in 2013 at Cadillac Arena, Beijing. The emcee for the awards ceremony were Mickey Huang and Ma Song.

== Shortlisted criteria ==
Merit categories for The 1st V Chart Awards are divided into 3 categories which are: "Date-based category", "Voting category" and "Jury category".

1. The "data-based category" award nominees are artists who released an official MV in between November 15, 2011 to November 30, 2012 and are selected according to their rank in the chart.

2. "The Most Popular Artists" series in the "voting category" of shortlisted nominees are the top 40 artists in all five regions. The top 5 artists with the most votes win.

3. "Jury category" nominees are shortlisted artists based on the year-long results of the China Billboard V Chart and the nominees will go through a panel of senior musicians.

== Voting ==
On March 10, 2013, The 1st V Chart Awards was officially launched after almost half a year of preparation and planning by YinYueTai and its global counterparts, Billboard and Gaon Charts. On March 12, the "Favourite Artist of the Year" series of polls began on the official website and commenced until April 11. The award ceremony was held two days after the polls were finalised.

== Lucky Draw ==
A lucky draw session was initiated to commemorate the establishment of the V Chart Awards by YinYueTai. The event commenced from March 22 until April 6 of 2013. Among the prizes to be won were tablet (1 unit), 1 headset (2 players), 1 mobster (6 players), genuine CD1 (15 players), Edifier H750 headset, Walkman M0 MK II speakers and the award ceremony entry tickets (a total of 150). After April 2, the turntable for the lucky draw was updated.

== Personnel ==
=== Host ===
YinYueTai

=== Data provider ===
YinYueTai Mobile App, YinYueTai PC App, YinYueTai Official Website, Baidu

=== Interworking partners ===
Billboard, Gaon Charts

== Winners and nominees ==
Data-based Category (数据类)
| Top Male Artist | Top Female Artist |
|---|---|
| Vision Wei | Jane Zhang |
| From other regions: JJ Lin - HK & Taiwan; Justin Bieber - Western; Kim Junsu (from JYJ) - Korea; EXILE ATSUSHI - Japan | From other regions: Jolin Tsai - HK & Taiwan; Katy Perry - Western; Kim Hyuna - Korea; Namie Amuro - Japan |
| Top Group | Top New Artist |
| M.I.C.; EXO-M | Moraynia Liu |
| From other regions: S.H.E. - HK & Taiwan; One Direction - Western; Super Junior - Korea; AKB48 - Japan | From other regions: Carly Rae Jepsen - Western; Jang Wooyoung (from 2PM) & B.A.P - Korea; Aimer - Japan |
Jury Category (评委会类)
| All-round Artist Of The Year | Top Social Singer |
| Shin | Aaron Yan |
| Breakthrough Artist Of The Year | Hot Trend Artist Of The Year |
| Qiao Renliang; Shin; Fiona Sit; Power Station | Yuexin Wang; Alan Dawa Dolma; Aska Yang; A-Lin |
| Best Duet | Best Cooperation Of The Year |
| Shin ft. A-Lin - Hugging in the Storm (狂风里拥抱) | Wu Mochou ft Harlem Yu - I Give You (我要给你) |
| Best Producer | Best Singer Songwriter Of The Year |
| Tiger Hu; JJ Lin | Li Xiaoyun; JJ Lin |
| Best Music Video of the Year | Best Album of The Year |
| JJ Lin - Never Learn; Li Yuchun - 似火年华; Will Pan - The Story of Billy; Jay Chou - Piano of Sorrow; Mayday - Cheers; Claire Kuo - Keep Loving; Hangeng - Clown Mask; Fiona Sit - Better Man; Aaron Yan - The Moment; Yoga Lin - Lure | Jane Zhang - Listen to Jane Z Live; Yoga Lin - Fiction; Super Junior M - Break Down; JJ Lin - Stories Untold; Hebe Tien - Insignificance |
Voting Category (投票类）
Favorite Artist Of The Year
EXO-M
From other regions: Jay Chou - HK & Taiwan; Taylor Swift - Western; Super Junior - Korea; Arashi - Japan
