= MLB China Series =

Baseball training events held in Beijing, China

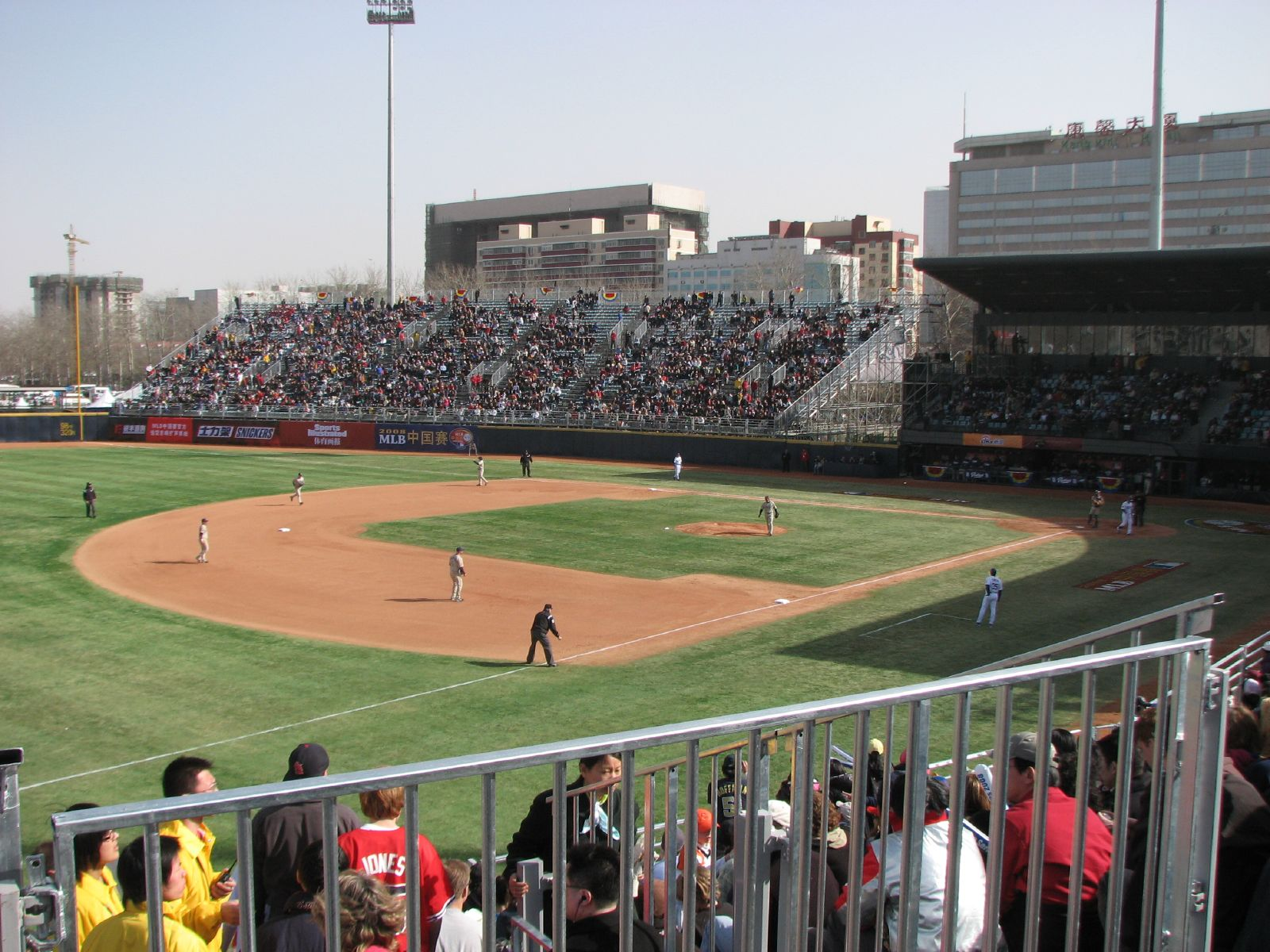
Wukesong Baseball Field in Beijing

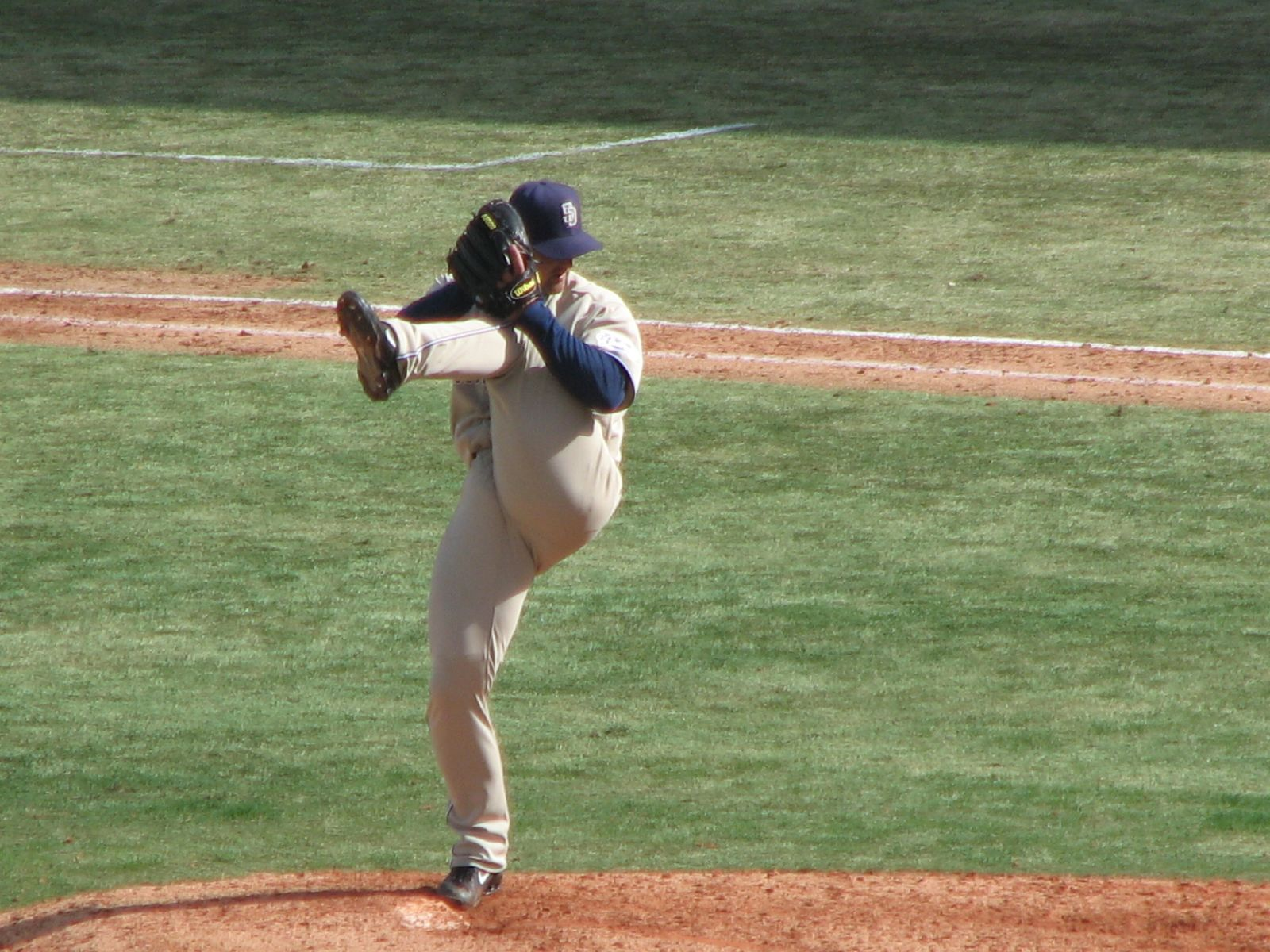
Trevor Hoffman, second all-time Major League Baseball saves leader behind Mariano Rivera, pitches in Game 1

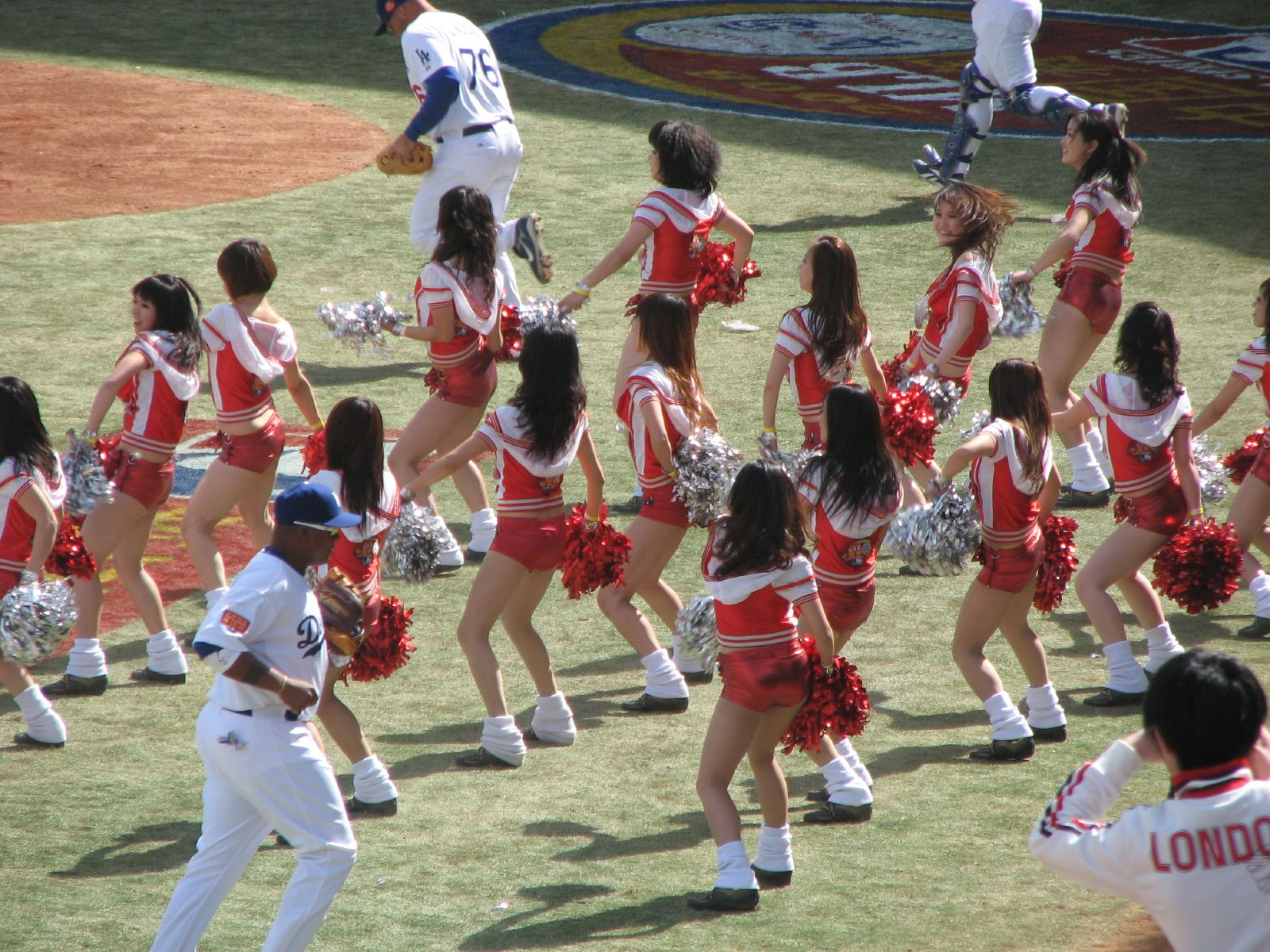
Cheerleaders during the game

The Major League Baseball China Series, or MLB China Series, were two 2008 spring training games between the San Diego Padres and Los Angeles Dodgers played in the People's Republic of China. It marked the first time Major League Baseball teams played in China, part of an effort to popularize baseball in that country. The games were played on March 15 and 16 at the now-demolished Wukesong Baseball Stadium in Beijing. During the series, both teams visited the Great Wall of China and the Padres held a clinic for the students at Fengtai School.

== Series summary ==
The series was composed of two spring training games, and all stats gained in the series were counted as such.

=== Game 1 ===
The first game was held on March 15, 2008.

Team	1	2	3	4	5	6	7	8	9	R	H	E
Los Angeles Dodgers	0	0	1	0	0	1	0	1	0	3	10	2
San Diego Padres	0	0	0	1	0	0	0	2	0	3	5	0
WP: None LP: None Sv: None; Home runs: LAD: George Lombard (3); SD: None

=== Game 2 ===
The second game was held on March 16, 2008.

Team	1	2	3	4	5	6	7	8	9	R	H	E
San Diego Padres	0	0	0	2	3	0	1	0	0	6	8	0
Los Angeles Dodgers	1	0	2	0	0	0	0	0	0	3	8	2
WP: Josh Geer (1–0) LP: Tanyon Sturtze (0–1) Sv: Paul Abraham (2)

== See also ==
- Baseball awards#China (People's Republic of China)
- List of Major League Baseball games played outside the United States and Canada
