= Qing Wang (academic) =

British academic

Qing Wang (Chinese: 王青; pinyin: Wáng Qīng) is a Chinese-born British academic, and Professor of Marketing and Innovation at Warwick Business School.

Prior to joining Warwick Business School in 2000, she was a faculty member at SPRU, University of Sussex.

Wang has been a visiting professor at the Fuqua School of Business, Duke University (2004–05), Tsinghua School of Economics and Management, Tsinghua University (2002–03), and INSEAD, Singapore (2009).
