= Wang Qing (actor) =

Chinese actor and singer

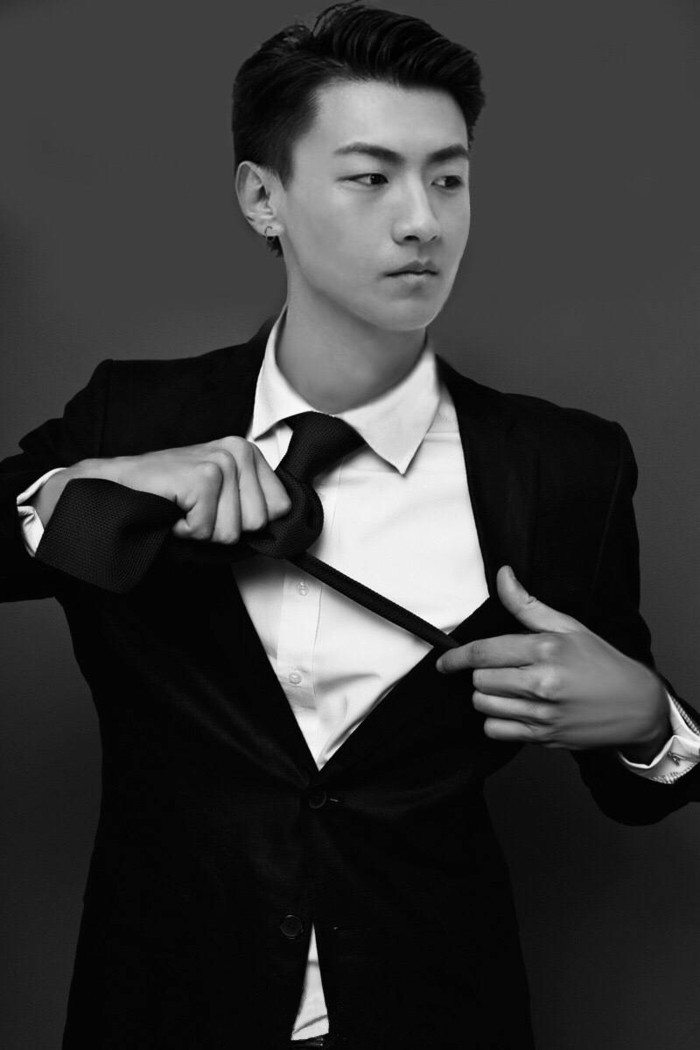
- Born: March 10, 1993 (age 32); Beijing, China
- Education: Beijing Union University
- Occupations: Singer; actor; host
- Years active: 2015–present
- Website: http://weibo.com/u/5607257930

Wang Qing (born 10 March 1993) is a Chinese actor, singer and host. He was invited to play Chi Cheng in the web series Counterattack in May 2015 and entered into the public eye. On 22 September 2015, he collaborated with Feng Jianyu and released the song This Summer. He has become a regular host for Super Show on Anhui Television since April 2016. In July 2016, he played a lead role in the film Infinite Fight.

== Early life and career ==
=== Life ===
Wang Qing was born in China. In 2012, he was admitted to Beijing Union University, initially majoring in acting. Later in his junior year, he transferred to broadcasting and hosting, and eventually graduated in 2016. During his school life, he once opened a diner called Malatang From The Stars. In 2015, his cousin approached him about acting in a web series.

=== Career ===
==== Film ====
Wang Qing began his career playing the role of Chi Cheng in the web series Counterattack, opposite his lover and classmate Feng Jianyu, that was released in August 2015. In September 2015, he joined the shooting of Counterattack special episode, which was released on September 16. Through the web series, he won the "Most Popular Web Series Actor" title awarded by Weibo Video Station. In July 2016, he co-starred in a web movie Infinite Fight with Feng Jianyu. The movie was nominated for seven awards in the World Chinese Science Fiction Movies Nebula Awards.

==== Music ====
On 22 September 2015, Wang Qing collaborated with Feng Jianyu and released the song This Summer. This Summer ranked No.1 on the Fresh Asia Weekly Chart for four consecutive weeks and also ranked first on the October monthly chart. This Summer also set a record of 460,000 digital copies sold on Sina Weibo. He co-starred with Feng Jianyu in the music video and short film of This Summer. This Summer music video ranked No.4 in YinYueTai 2015 Mainland TOP 100. Wang Qing held three fan meetings for This Summer with Feng Jianyu, in Tianjin, Chengdu and Shenzhen. This Summer won the "Most Popular Collaboration" in the 16th Top Chinese Music Annual Festival.

In March 2016, Wang Qing released his first single, DEMO. DEMO ranked No.1 on the Fresh Asia Chart for four consecutive weeks and ranked first on its March monthly chart.

In December 2016, Wang Qing released his first album "December". The first limited edition 5000 copies were sold out in seconds. The album got Platinum record sale.

==== Stage ====
In April 2016, Wang Qing played Zhang Yang in The Left Ear stage play at Beijing Bao Li Theater. It was his first stage work.

==== Host ====
In March 2016, Wang Qing co-hosted the 2nd KU Music Asian Music Awards red carpet show with Feng Jianyu. In April, he co-hosted two episodes of Super Show on Anhui Television and was later confirmed as a regular host. Since March 2017, he is one of the hosts of IQIYI foodie travel show "Eat the Whole Universe" (吃光全宇宙).

== Discography ==
=== Singles ===
Year	English title	Chinese title	Notes
2015	This Summer	今夏	With Feng Jianyu
2016	DEMO	—N/a	Released on Internet
2016	Happy	逍遥	Promotional
2017	I	我	

=== Album ===
Year	English title	Chinese title	Notes
2017	December	十二月	Platinum record

== Filmography ==
=== Web ===
Year	English title	Chinese title	Role	Notes
2015	Counterattack	逆袭之爱上情敌	Chi Cheng	8 episodes
2015	This Summer	今夏		Short Film
2015	Who Am I	我是谁	Himself	Documentary Reality Show
2016	Infinite Fight	无限斗界之暗夜双龙	Zhou Li/Crow	Lead Role, Producer

=== Reality shows ===
Year	Title	Chinese title	Note	Ref.
2019	Super Penguin League; Season:2	超级企鹅联盟 Super3	Player; Live Basketball Competition	

=== Host ===
Year	English title	Chinese title	Notes
2016	KU Music Asian Music Awards	酷音乐亚洲盛典	Co-Host of the Red Carpet Show
2016	Super Show	超级大首映	Co-Host
2016	"1.3 DB"	十三亿分贝	Co-Host
2017	"Eat the Whole Universe"	吃光全宇宙	Co-Host

=== Stage ===
Year	English title	Chinese title	Role	Notes
2016	The Left Ear	左耳	Zhang Yang	Beijing Bao Li Theatre

== Awards and nominations ==
Year	Award	Category	Nominated work	Result	Ref
2015	Weibo Video Awards	Most Popular Web Series Actor	Counterattack	Won	
2016	KuGou Fanxing Annual Festival	Most Influential Artist of the Year		Won	
2016	KU Music Asian Music Awards	XingYueFang Most Popular Artist		Won	
2016	Top Chinese Music Annual Festival	Most Popular Collaboration	This Summer	Won	
2016	Vchart Awards	Top New Artist – Mainland	This Summer	Won	
2016	Vchart Awards	Favorite Artist of the Year – Mainland	This Summer	Won	
2016	Vchart Awards	Most Popular Artist of the Night	This Summer	Won	
2017	5th Vchart Awards	Most Popular Artist – Mainland		Won	
