= Beijing Union University =

Municipal university in Beijing

- 北京联合大学
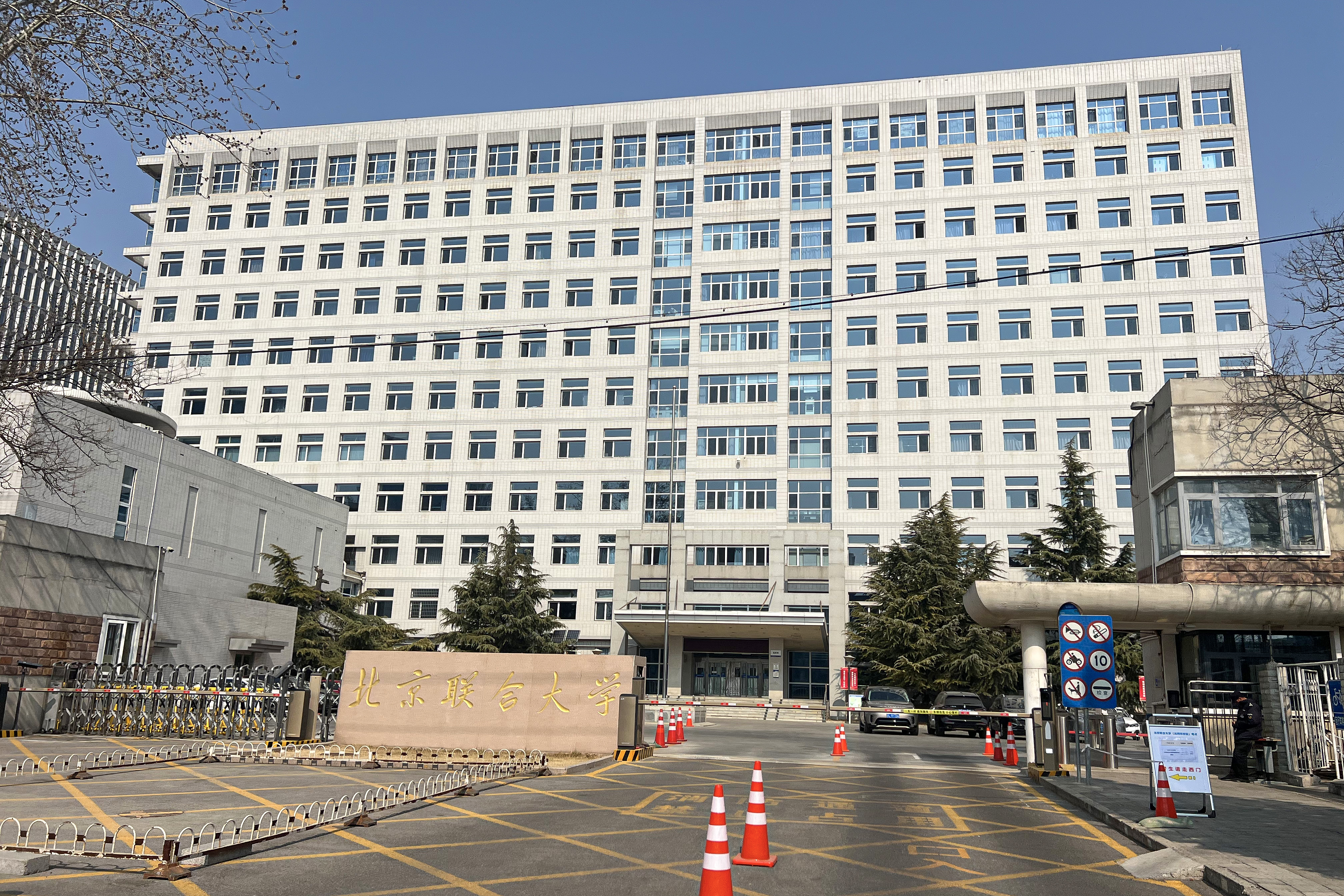
- Type: Municipal
- Established: 1985; 41 years ago
- Academic staff: 1200 (2006)
- Students: 30,000 (2006)
- Undergraduates: 13,800 (2006)
- Location: Beijing, China; 39.98903°N 116.42085°E
- Campus: Urban 67.3 ha (0.673 km^{2})
- Website: www.buu.edu.cn

The Beijing Union University (Abbreviation: BUU, Chinese: 北京联合大学) is a municipal university administered by the Beijing government of China. In order to facilitate the municipal development, BUU was established in the 1980s, incorporating vocational schools and taking over some of the satellite campuses affiliated to universities including Peking University, Tsinghua University, Renmin University, Beijing Foreign Studies University, Beijing International Studies University, etc.

•

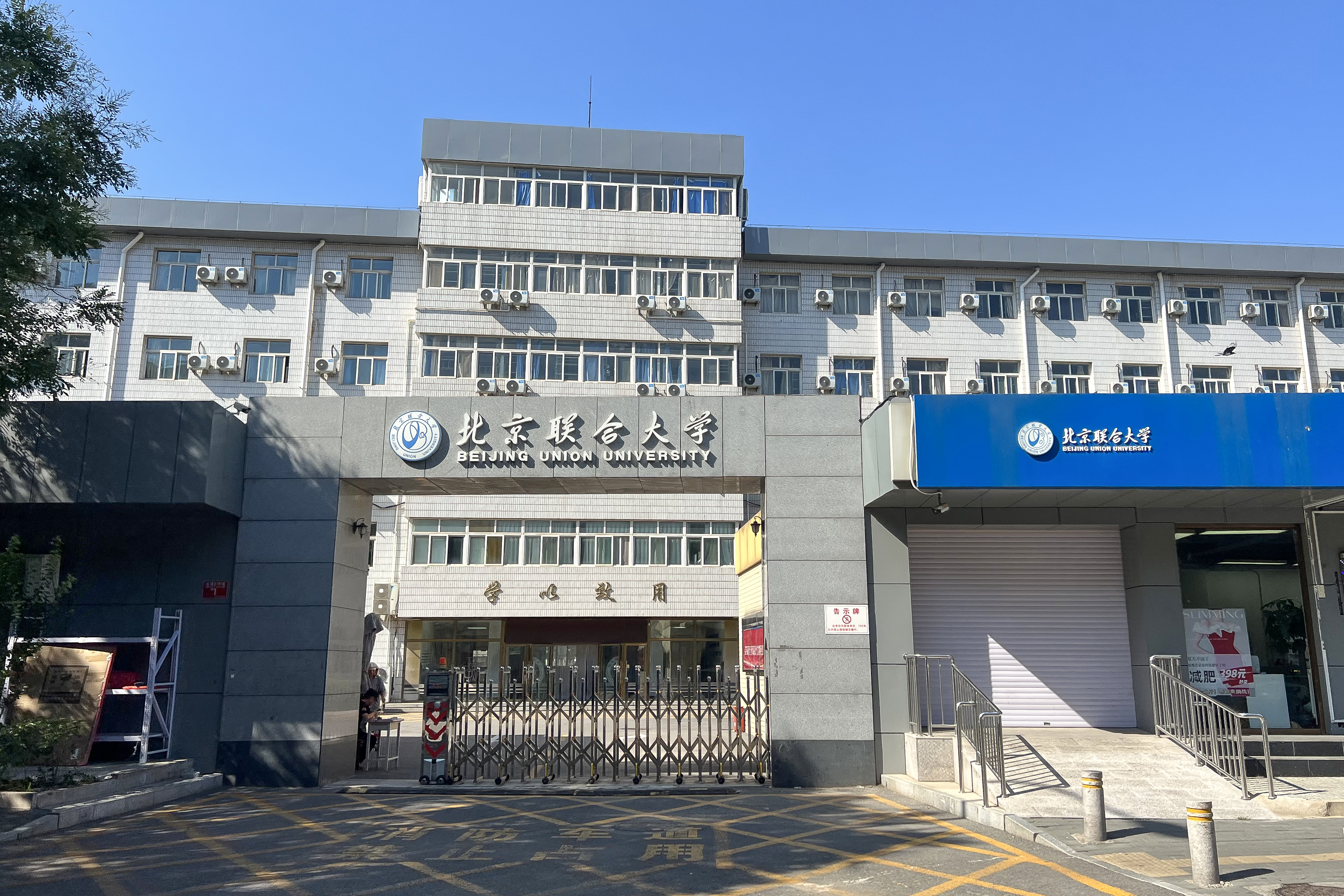
Beijing Union University Beiyuan Campus (formerly Beijing Medical Device School)

•

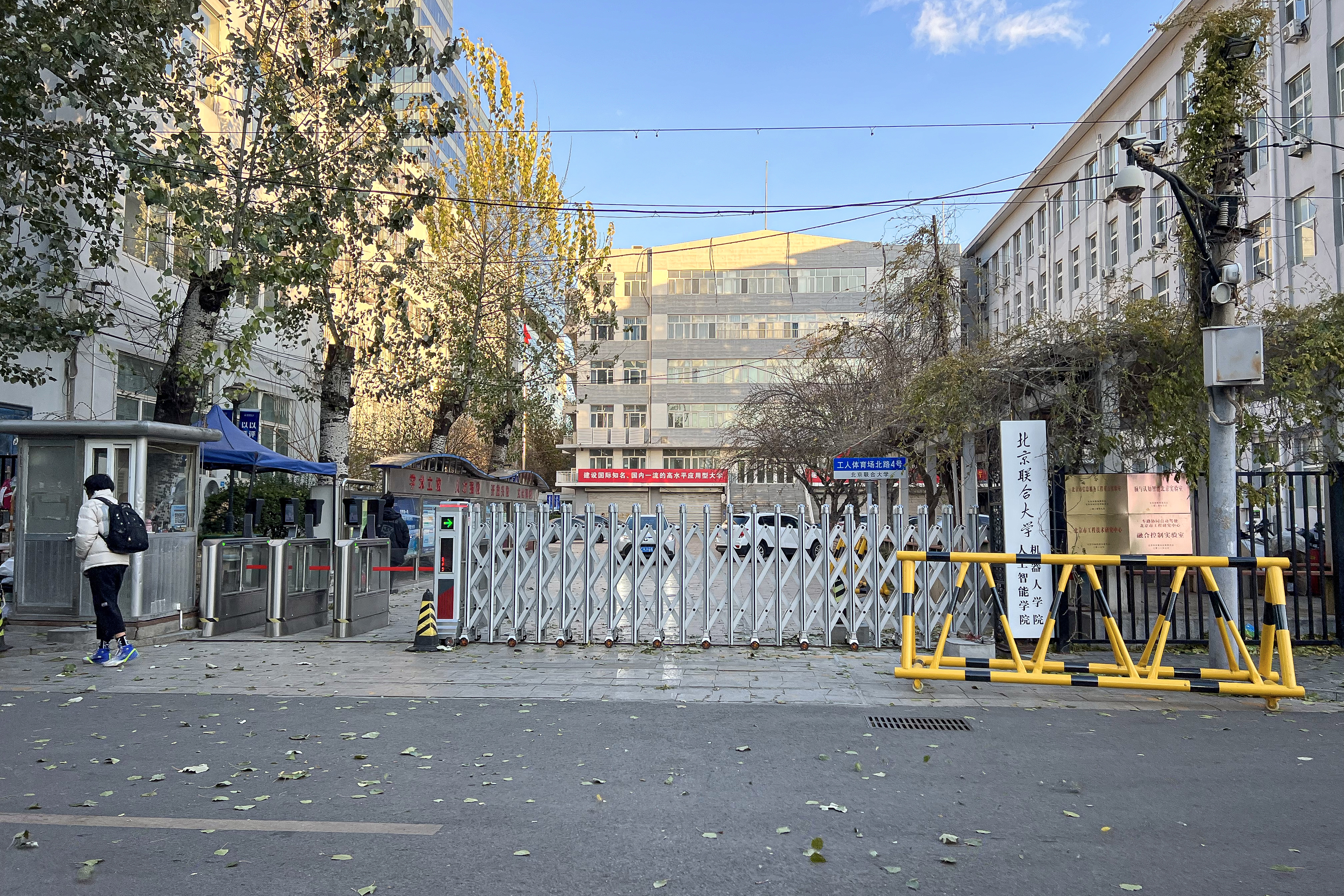
Beijing Union University Gongti Beilu Campus (College of Robotics / College of Artificial Intelligence)

•

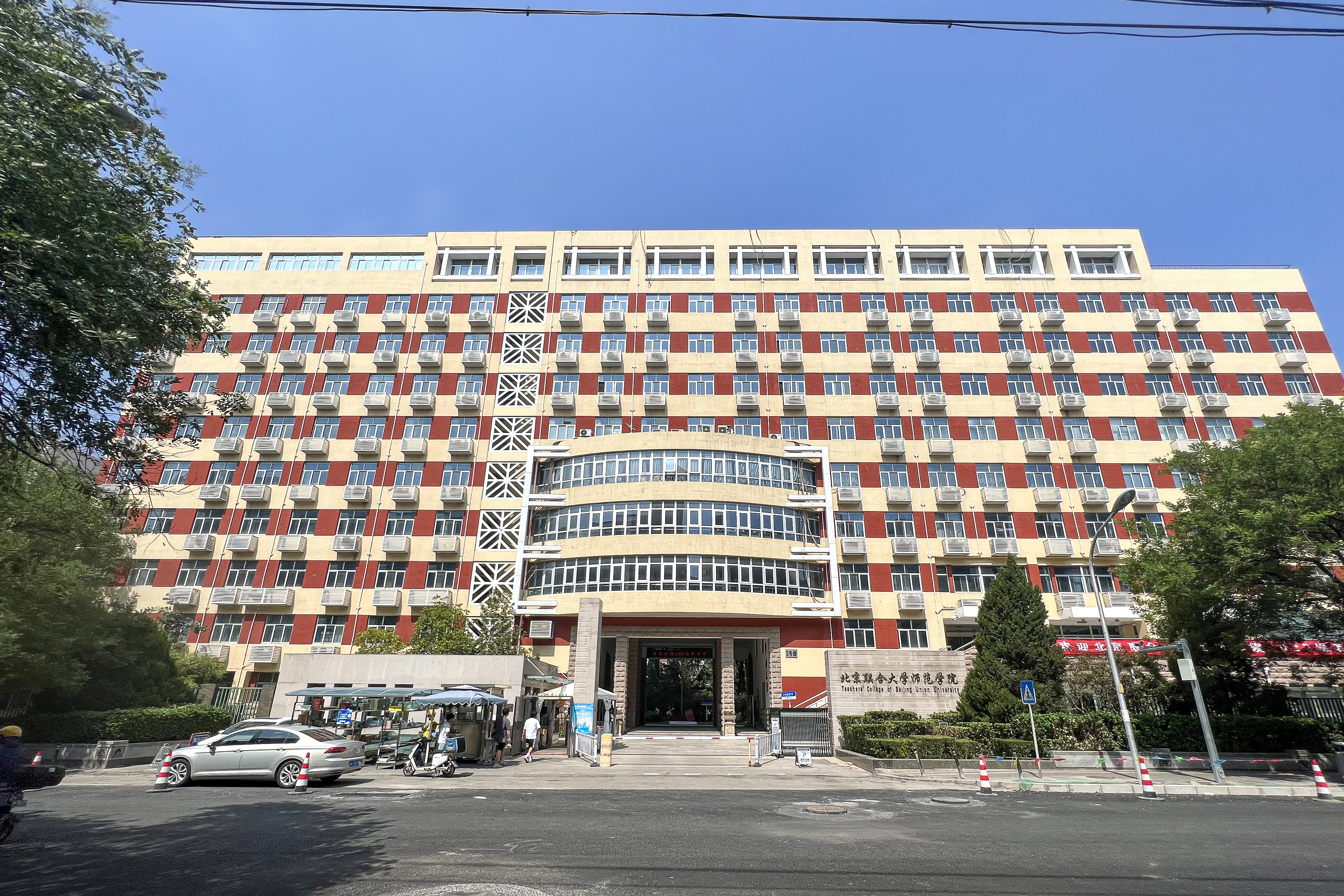
Teachers' College of Beijing Union University

•

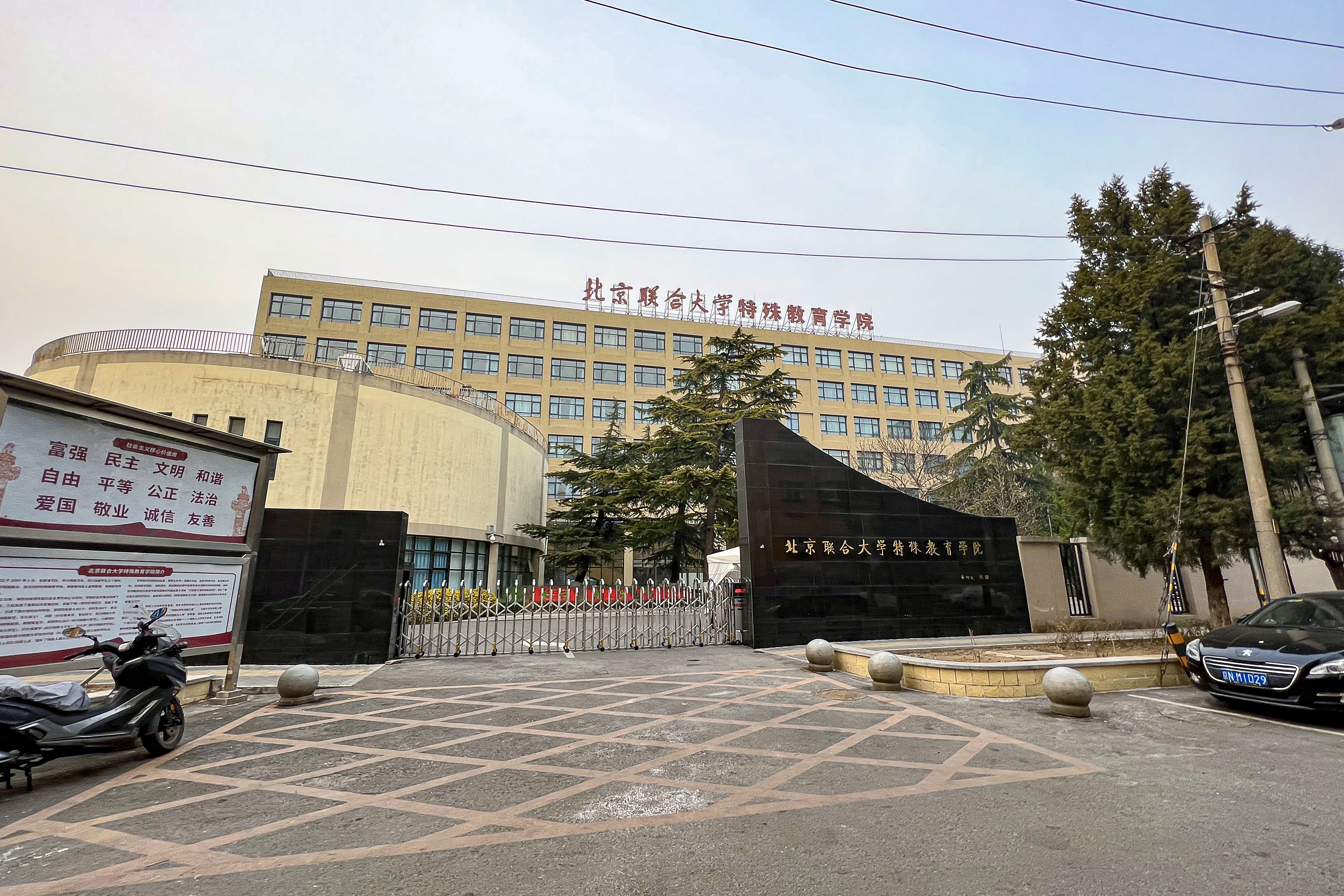
College of Special Education, Beijing Union University, located in Puhuangyu

•

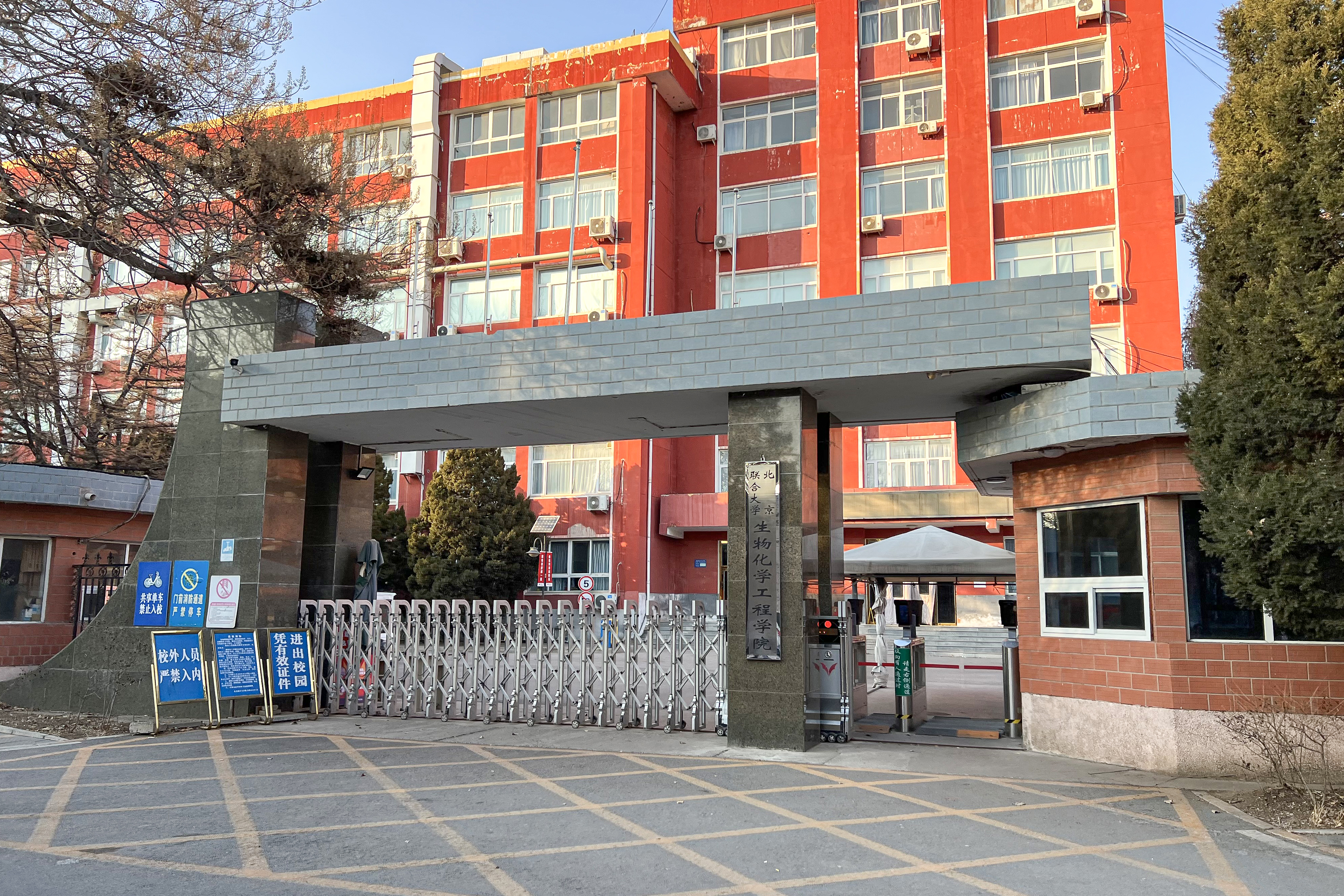
College of Biochemical Engineering, Beijing Union University, located in Fatou
