= Ku Music Asian Music Awards =

Chinese music awards program

The Ku Music Asian Music Awards (Chinese: 酷音乐亚洲盛典) was a Chinese music awards program founded by music streaming and download services KuGou and KuWo in 2015. It was discontinued in June 2016 after China Music Group was merged into Tencent.
