= YinYueTai =

YinYueTai.com
- Company type: Private
- Website type: Video sharing
- Available in: Simplified Chinese
- Founded: 2009
- Headquarters: Beijing, {{{location_country}}}
- Key people: Zhang Dou
- Industry: Web 2.0
- Services: Social network service, MV
- Website: www.yinyuetai.com
- Registration: Optional (required to upload)
- Current status: Inactive

YinYueTai (simplified Chinese: 音悦Tai; traditional Chinese: 音悅Tai; pinyin: Yīn yuè tái) is a music video sharing website in China. Launched in 2009, the site became China's most visited music video website by 2015. As of December 2019, YinYueTai is rumored to have been closed down.

The website first published charts ranking the popularity of music videos in 2010, and, in 2016, Billboard partnered with YinYueTai to publish the China V Chart on its website. Beginning in 2013, YinYueTai hosted the annual V Chart Awards, which honored musical artists from across Asia.

== Summary ==
The website started when the founder could not easily find the music video which he was looking for, or when he found it on some site that had too many ads. Currently YinYueTai has no ads, and unlike YouTube where you can find multiple copies of the same music video, YinYueTai only keeps one copy of each music video on site for easy search.

== Copyright ==
YinYueTai has copyright agreements with Sony Music, Universal Music, Warner Music, Rock Records, B'in Music, AVEX, S.M. Entertainment, JYP Entertainment, and others home and abroad, including MBC, KBS and other overseas television networks.

== V Chart ==
Starting in July 2011, the site began to have a monthly music video chart in five different categories based on the artist's region (Mainland, Hong Kong and Taiwan, Europe and United States, Korea, and Japan), and in November the site began to have a weekly chart.

== V Chart Awards ==
- 1st V Chart Awards (2013)
- 2nd V Chart Awards (2014)
- 3rd V Chart Awards (2015)
- 4th V Chart Awards (2016)
- 5th V Chart Awards (2017)
