= Bowie Tsang =

Taiwanese television host, singer, actress, and writer

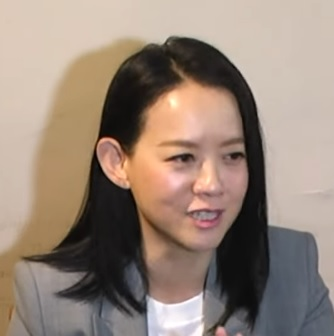
- Tsang in April 2022
- Born: 21 February 1973 (age 53); British Hong Kong
- Other name: Ah-Po (阿寶)
- Education: National Taiwan University (BA)
- Occupations: Singer; presenter; actress
- Years active: 1995–present
- Parents: Eric Tsang (father); Wang Mei Hua (mother)
- Family: Tsang Wing Yee (sister); Derek Tsang (half-brother); Mark Tsang (half-brother)

Chinese name
- Traditional Chinese: 曾寶儀
- Simplified Chinese: 曾宝仪
- Hanyu Pinyin: Zēng Bǎoyí
- Musical career
- Genres: Mandopop
- Instrument: Vocals
- Label: Forward Music

Bowie Tsang Po Yee (Chinese: 曾寶儀; pinyin: Zēng Bǎoyí; born 21 February 1973) is a Hong Kong-Taiwanese television host, singer, actress, and writer. She is the daughter of Eric Tsang.

== Career ==
Tsang was born in Hong Kong to actor Eric Tsang and his first wife, Wang Mei-Wah. She was raised in both Hong Kong and Taipei, and graduated from National Taiwan University in 1995 with a bachelor's degree in sociology. Her half-brother, Derek Tsang, from her father's second marriage, is an Oscar- and Primetime Emmy-nominated director.

While at university, she worked as an assistant producer at Zhen Yan She, a subsidiary of Rock Records. She then held various behind-the-scenes roles in film and television in Hong Kong, including script supervision and production assistance, as her father discouraged her from pursuing an entertainment career through his connections.

Tsang returned to Taiwan in 1997 and became a host on Chung T'ien Television (formerly CTN). She was discovered by Taiwanese producer Chang Hsiao-yen, who signed Tsang to her management company in 1999. From 1999 to 2003, she released six albums.

In 2000, Tsang was implicated in a high-profile breakup between Mickey Huang and Dee Hsu, after Hsu accused Tsang of having an affair with Huang. The allegation was substantiated in 2001 with paparazzi photos published in the inaugural issue of Next Magazine (Taiwan), prompting Tsang's shift from Taiwan to mainland China, where she pursued an acting career throughout the 2000s. She shifted her career back to Taiwan in the 2010s, and won the Best Entertainment Program Host at the 2013 Golden Bell Awards. In 2019, she was the interviewer on Grain Media's documentary series, The Eve of Tomorrow.

== Selected filmography ==
=== Hosting ===
- TVBS-G《Super Live 3-5》
- TTV《綜藝旗艦 Hello Jacky!》
- TVBS-G《晚安各位觀眾》
- TVBS-G《哈囉各位觀眾》
- 飛碟電台《飛碟小點心，寶貝七點鐘》
- 香港亞洲電視《亞洲星光大道》
- Taiwan Television - 百萬小學堂
- Let's Go Home (2020)
- Let's Go Home (2022; season 2)
- Music Viva Viva (2022)

=== As actress ===
Year	English title	Original title	Role	Notes
2009	Pinoy Sunday	台北星期天	House-moving wife	
2015	All You Need Is Love	落跑吧愛情	Press conference host	
2021	American Girl	美國女孩	Dr. Han	

== Discography ==
Album	Title	Date of release
1st	阿寶 a*baw	April 1, 1999; Forward Music
2nd	想愛; Hope in Love	August 1, 2000; Forward Music
3rd	我們的童話; Our Fairy Tale	June 1, 2001; Forward Music
4th	專注; Concentration	November 29, 2002; Forward Music

== Bibliography ==
- 《阿寶靚湯》
- 《阿寶靚湯2：寶媽寶妹幸福湯》
- 《阿寶靚湯3：美人湯．孕婦湯42品》
- 《阿寶靚湯4：40道養生美容素食湯方》
- 《寶媽寶妹交換日記：不能和媽媽說的事》
