= Wukesong Arena =

Sports arena in Beijing

Wukesong Arena (Bloomage Biotech Runbaiyan Center)
- 五棵松体育馆（华熙生物·润百颜中心）
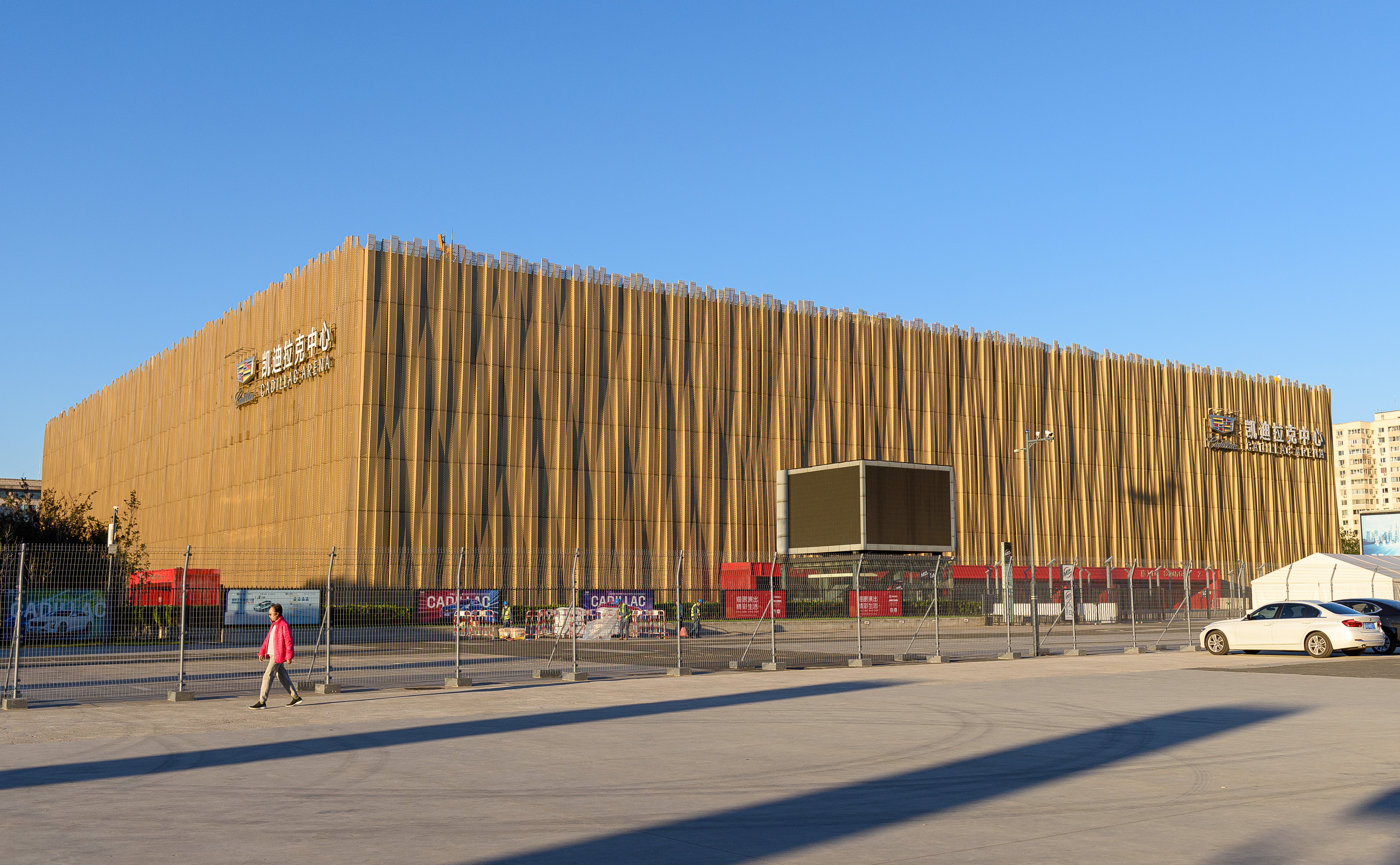
- Exterior of arena (2021)
- Interactive map of Wukesong Arena (Bloomage Biotech Runbaiyan Center)
- Former names: Wukesong Culture & Sports Center (2008–2011); MasterCard Center (2011–2015); LeSports Center (2016–2017); Huaxi Live (2017); Cadillac Arena (2017–2023); Huaxi Live Wukesong (2024-2025)
- Address: 69 Fuxing Road
- Location: Haidian District, Beijing, China
- Coordinates: 39°54′36″N 116°16′29″E
- Owner: Bloomage International Investment Group
- Operator: AEG
- Capacity: 19,000; 9,000 (ice hockey)
- Public transit: Wukesong 1

Construction
- Groundbreaking: 29 March 2005
- Opened: 11 January 2008
- Renovated: 2009
- Closed: October 2008 – November 2009
- Architect: Gu Yonghui

Tenants
- Beijing Ducks (CBA) (2010–present); HC Kunlun Red Star (KHL) (2016–present); Beijing Lions (CAFL) (2016)

Website
- Venue Website

The Wukesong Arena (simplified Chinese: 五棵松体育馆; traditional Chinese: 五棵松體育館; pinyin: Wǔkēsōng Tǐyùguǎn), also known as the Bloomage Biotech Runbaiyan Center (simplified Chinese: 华熙生物·润百颜中心; traditional Chinese: 華熙生物·潤百顏中心; pinyin: Huáxī Shēngwù·Rùnbǎiyán Zhōngxīn) for sponsorship purposes, is a multipurpose indoor arena in Beijing. It was originally built for the 2008 Summer Olympics basketball preliminaries and finals. Ground was broken on 29 March 2005 and construction was completed on 11 January 2008.

The stadium has a capacity of 19,000 and covers an area of 63,000 square metres. It includes a modern, flexible ice hockey rink designed and produced by Finnish rink manufacturer Vepe Oy in November 2016.

The arena was the main venue of the ice hockey tournament during the 2022 Winter Olympics.

== History ==
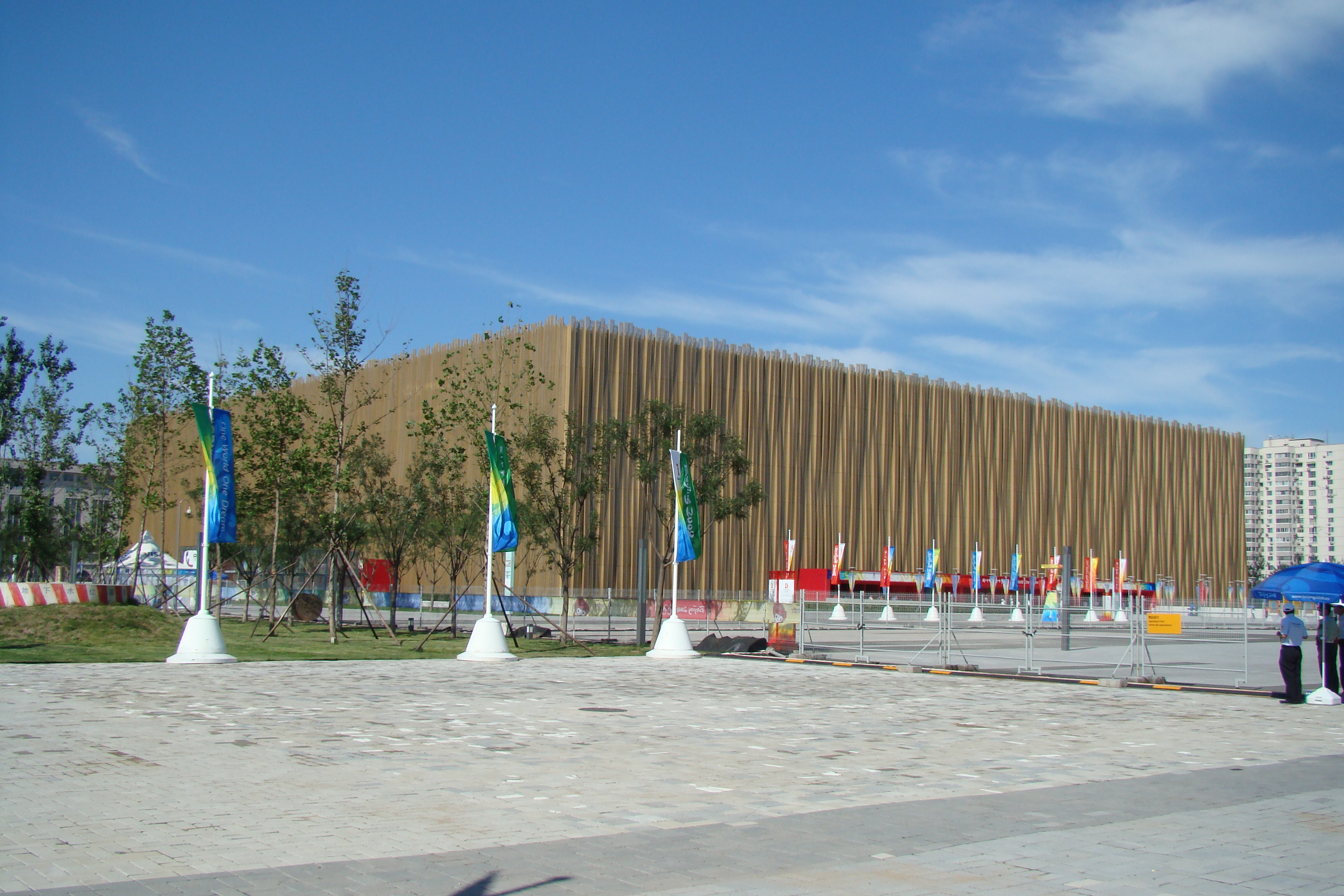
The arena in February 2007

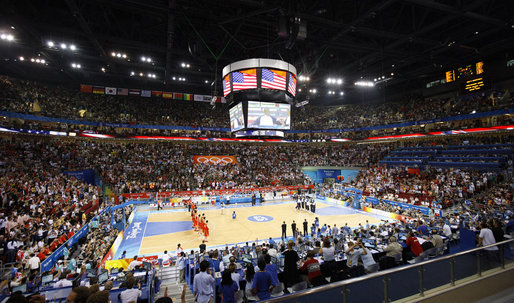
The arena during the 2008 Summer Olympics

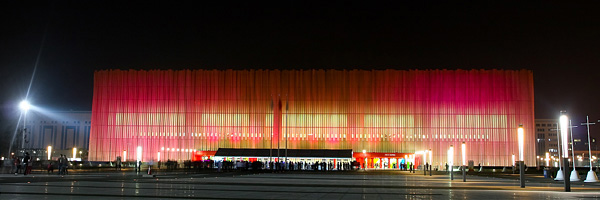
Exterior of arena (c. 2008)

The stadium was constructed by "Beijing Wukesong Cultural & Sports Co. Ltd." whose five shareholders are Zhongguancun CENCONS Group, Haidian State-owned Assets Investment Co. Ltd, Beijing Urban Construction Group Co. Ltd, Beijing Urban Construction Co. Ltd and the Tianhong Group. After the Olympic Games, the center became an important part of Beijing's Olympic Games heritage, allowing citizens to enjoy cultural, sports, leisure, recreational, and commercial activities. It was a large-scale comprehensive project, rare in Beijing in integrating cultural, sporting, and commercial purposes with large-scale gardens and green spaces.

On 6 January 2011 MasterCard Worldwide, the rival of Olympic sponsor Visa, announced the acquisition of the naming rights to the center. It was renamed MasterCard Center effective from 21 January 2011. Nearly five years later, on 16 December 2015, LeTV Sports announced that it has obtained naming rights for the arena. It was officially renamed as LeSports Center on 1 January 2016. Beyond that, LeSports promised to provide a package of intellectual services inside and outside the arena. After the closing of LeTV Sports, the arena was briefly named Huaxi Live. From September 2017 until 2023, the Cadillac division of General Motors has owned naming rights for the arena.

On 14 December 2015 the Kontinental Hockey League (KHL) announced that its Beijing expansion team would play in the arena. On 5 September 2016, Kunlun Red Star defenseman Anssi Salmela scored the first goal in the arena's first hockey game and the first home goal for Kunlun in KHL. Red Star won the game 6–3.

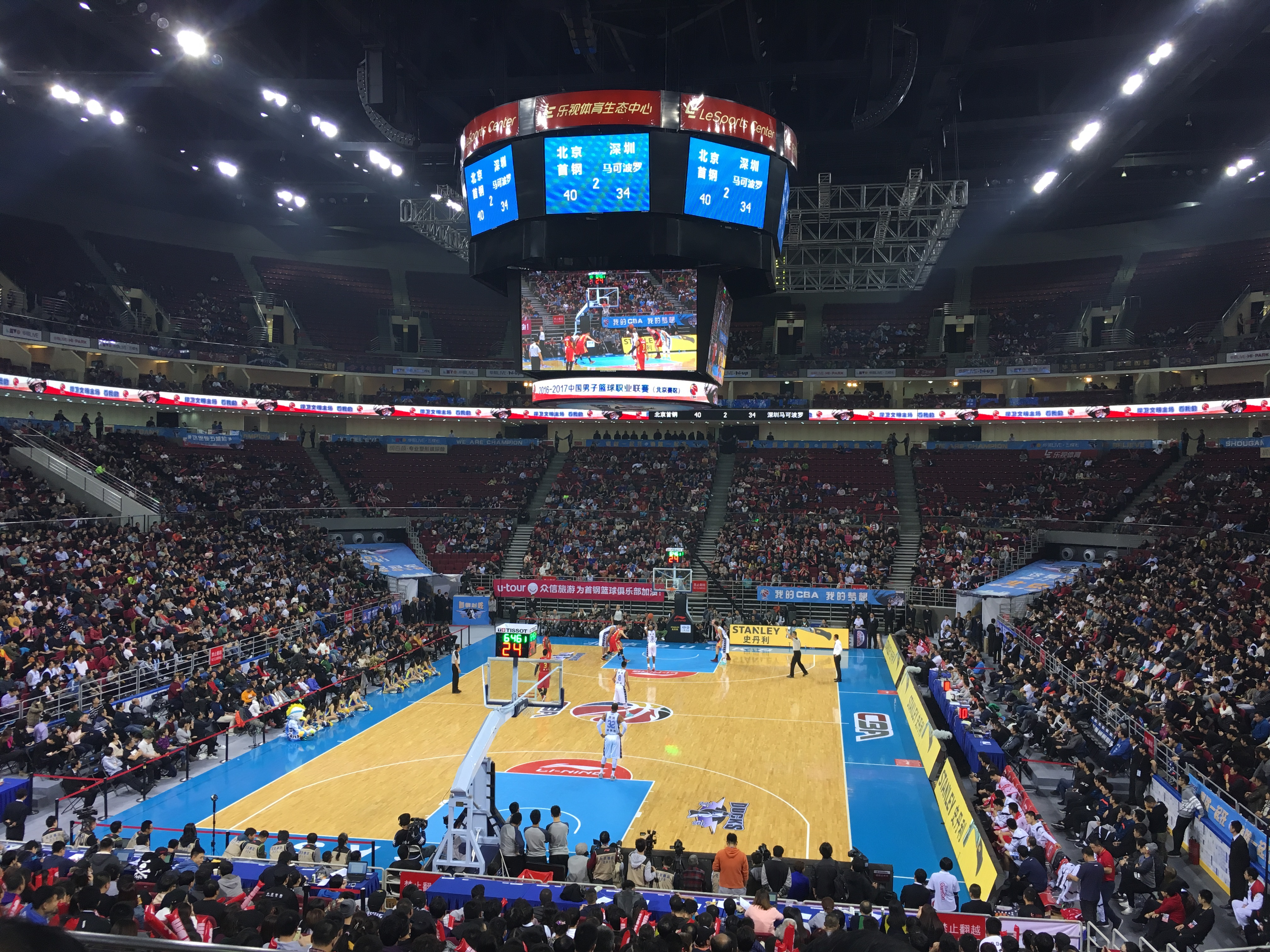
The inside of the arena

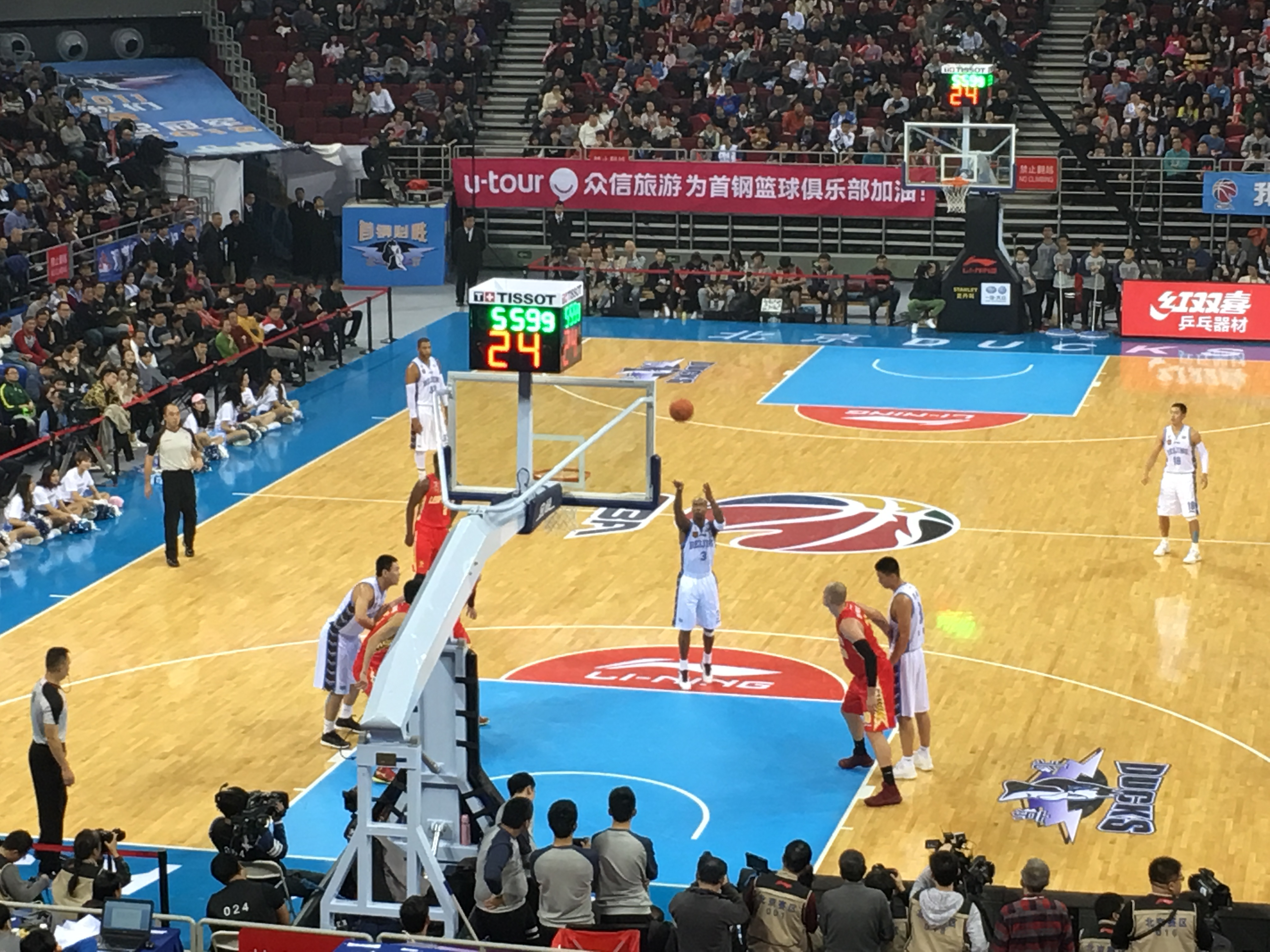
Stephon Marbury shooting a free throw.

In 2017, 18,000 people attended the Chinese Basketball Association All-Star Game at the LeSports Centre.

== Sporting events ==
A list of sporting events held at Wukesong Arena
Year	Date	Event
2008	17 October	NBA Global Games: Golden State Warriors vs. Milwaukee Bucks
2009	11 October	NBA Global Games: Indiana Pacers vs. Denver Nuggets
2010	13 October	NBA Global Games: Houston Rockets vs. New Jersey Nets
2012	11 October	NBA Global Games: Miami Heat vs. Los Angeles Clippers
2013	15 October	NBA Global Games: Golden State Warriors vs. Los Angeles Lakers
2014	15 October	NBA Global Games: Brooklyn Nets vs. Sacramento Kings
2014	25 November	M-1 Challenge 53 – Battle in the Celestial Empire
2017	23 September	NHL China Games: Los Angeles Kings vs. Vancouver Canucks
2018	24 November	UFC Fight Night 141
2019	16 November	ONE Championship: Age of Dragons
2019	31 August–15 September	2019 FIBA Basketball World Cup: Several matches, including the final
2022	3–17 February	2022 Winter Olympics: Women's Ice Hockey

== Entertainment ==
The Wukesong Arena is the biggest entertainment venue in Beijing, with many international, regional and local artists having staged their performance at the venue that spans a wide range of musical genres. International artists are highlighted using light blue in the table while non-concert entertainment events are also included.

A list of entertainment events held at Wukesong Arena
Year	Date	Nationality	Artists	Tours
2008	6 October	Canada	Avril Lavigne	The Best Damn World Tour
2008	1 November	United States	Kanye West	Glow in the Dark Tour
2009	23 October	United States	Beyoncé	I Am... World Tour
2010	23 January	South Korea	Super Junior	2nd Asia Tour – "Super Show 2"
2010	14 March	United States	Backstreet Boys	This Is Us Tour
2010	11 July	United States	Usher	OMG Tour
2011	2 January	Taiwan (ROC)	Fei Yu-ching	2011费玉清北京演唱会
2011	21 January	Hong Kong	Jacky Cheung	Jacky Cheung 1/2 Century Tour
2011	12 March	United States	Eagles	Long Road Out of Eden Tour
2011	26 March	South Korea	Rain	2011 Rain Asia Tour
2011	7 May	—N/a		The Girls Collection
2011	13 May	—N/a		Glorious Days – Pantheon Rock "n" Roll World Tour Concert
2011	21 May	China (PRC)	Dao Lang	de Show Beel Live in Concert 2011
2011	27 May	Hong Kong	Aaron Kwok	郭富城武林正传世界巡回演唱会
2011	28 May	Hong Kong	Aaron Kwok	郭富城武林正传世界巡回演唱会
2011	3 June	Taiwan (ROC)	Chyi Yu; Michelle Pan; Tiger Huang; One-Fang	Power Woman
2011	18 June	Taiwan (ROC)	Wakin Chau; Jeff Chang; Chyi Chin; Chao Chuan; Dave Wang; Angus Tung	老友记六人行2011北京大型演唱会
2011	16 July	Taiwan (ROC)	Elva Hsiao	E!VA萧亚轩WOW世界巡回演唱会-北京站
2011	25 September	Ireland	Westlife	Gravity Tour
2012	14 February	Canada	Avril Lavigne	Black Star Tour
2012	22 February	Ireland	Westlife	Greatest Hits Tour
2012	12 March	Sweden	Roxette	Charm School World Tour
2012	6 April	Canada	Sum 41	Screaming Bloody Murder Tour
2012	7 July	South Korea	Shinhwa	Grand Tour: The Return
2012	8 August	South Korea	Big Bang	Alive Galaxy Tour
2012	25 November	United Kingdom	Elton John	40th Anniversary of the Rocket Man Tour
2013	24 March	Canada	Simple Plan	Get Your Hearts on Tour
2013	4 May	South Korea	G-Dragon	One of a Kind World Tour
2013	5 May	South Korea	G-Dragon	One of a Kind World Tour
2013	13 April	—N/a		The 1st V Chart Awards
2013	25 May	United States	Backstreet Boys	In a World Like This Tour
2013	28 June	United Kingdom	Sarah Brightman	Dreamchaser World Tour
2013	20 July	South Korea	Shinhwa	Grand Tour: The Classic
2013	9 August	—N/a		Michael Jackson: The Immortal World Tour
2013	10 August	—N/a		Michael Jackson: The Immortal World Tour
2013	11 August	—N/a		Michael Jackson: The Immortal World Tour
2013	22 August	United Kingdom	Pet Shop Boys	Electric Tour
2013	29 September	Canada	Justin Bieber	Believe Tour
2013	1 October	United States	The Killers	Battle Born World Tour
2014	4 February	United Kingdom	James Blunt	Moon Landing Tour
2014	2 March	Canada	Avril Lavigne	The Avril Lavigne Tour
2014	5 April	United States	Bruno Mars	Moonshine Jungle Tour
2014	19 April	South Korea	2NE1	All or Nothing World Tour
2014	16 May	Hong Kong	G.E.M.	G.E.M. X.X.X. LIVE 世界巡回演唱会北京站
2014	17 May	Hong Kong	G.E.M.	G.E.M. X.X.X. LIVE 世界巡回演唱会北京站
2014	30 May	China (PRC)	Wanting Qu	2014曲婉婷say the words 我为你歌唱 中国巡回演唱会
2014	31 May	China (PRC)	Wanting Qu	2014曲婉婷say the words 我为你歌唱 中国巡回演唱会
2014	18 July	Taiwan (ROC)	Jeff Chang	"华素 还爱光年" 世界巡回演唱会
2014	2 August	Taiwan (ROC)	S.H.E	2gether 4ever World Tour
2014	3 August	Taiwan (ROC)	Mayday	Just Love It 拥抱演唱会
2014	6 September	China (PRC)	Hua Chenyu	华晨宇火星演唱会
2014	7 September	China (PRC)	Hua Chenyu	华晨宇火星演唱会
2014	13 September	Singapore	Yida Huang	黄义达十周年纪念演唱会
2014	20 September	China (PRC); South Korea	Exo	Exo from Exoplanet #1 – The Lost Planet
2014	21 September	China (PRC); South Korea	Exo	Exo from Exoplanet #1 – The Lost Planet
2014	25 October	China (PRC)	Yang Kun	杨坤"今夜20岁"北京演唱会
2014	22 November	South Korea	Super Junior	Super Show 6
2015	14 January	—N/a		Golden Disk Awards
2015	15 January	—N/a		Golden Disk Awards
2015	1 April	United States	Pitbull	2015 World Tour
2015	18 April	United States	Backstreet Boys	In a World Like This Tour
2015	9 May	Singapore	JJ Lin	Timeline：Genesis World Tour
2015	6 June	South Korea	Big Bang	Made World Tour
2015	7 June	South Korea	Big Bang	Made World Tour
2015	13 June	China (PRC)	Bibi Zhou	BOOM!
2015	18 July	China (PRC); South Korea	Exo	Exo Planet #2 – The Exo'luxion
2015	19 July	China (PRC); South Korea	Exo	Exo Planet #2 – The Exo'luxion
2015	19 September	United Kingdom	Muse	Drones World Tour
2016	10 April	—N/a	The 4th V Chart Awards	
2016	24 April	United Kingdom	Iron Maiden	The Book of Souls World Tour
2016	2 July	China (PRC)	Hua Chenyu	Mars Concert Season 3
2016	3 July	China (PRC)	Hua Chenyu	Mars Concert Season 3
2016	8 July	Taiwan (ROC)	Jay Chou	The Invisible Show Tour
2016	9 July	Taiwan (ROC)	Jay Chou	The Invisible Show Tour
2016	10 July	Taiwan (ROC)	Jay Chou	The Invisible Show Tour
2016	16 July	South Korea	Big Bang	Made V.I.P Tour
2016	17 July	South Korea	Big Bang	Made V.I.P Tour
2016	24 September	Hong Kong	Wallace Chung	Sing For Live
2016	6 October	United States	Kesha	Kesha and the Creepies: Fuck the World Tour
2016	21 October	Hong Kong	Jacky Cheung	A Classic Tour
2016	22 October	Hong Kong	Jacky Cheung	A Classic Tour
2016	23 October	Hong Kong	Jacky Cheung	A Classic Tour
2017	18 January	United States	Metallica	WorldWired Tour
2017	17 June	China (PRC)	Joker Xue	薛之谦"我好像在哪见过你"巡回演唱会
2017	26 August	United States	Ariana Grande	Dangerous Woman Tour
2018	7 May	United States	Fall Out Boy	Mania Tour
2018	19 May	Singapore	JJ Lin	Sanctuary World Tour
2018	20 May	Singapore	JJ Lin	Sanctuary World Tour
2018	6 September	United Kingdom	Jessie J	R.O.S.E Tour
2019	23 February	China (PRC)	Rocket Girls 101	2019火箭少女101北京飞行演唱会-Light
2019	10 August	Taiwan (ROC)	Fei Yu-ching	费玉清2019告别演唱会
2019	13 August	Ireland	Westlife	The Twenty Tour
2023	5 August	Taiwan (ROC)	A-Mei	ASMR Would Tour
2023	6 August	Taiwan (ROC)	A-Mei	ASMR Would Tour
2023	2 September	Taiwan (ROC)	Wakin Chau	少年俠客
2023	23 September	Ireland	Westlife	The Wild Dreams Tour
2023	24 September	Ireland	Westlife	The Wild Dreams Tour
2024	5 April	Hong Kong	Jacky Cheung	The Jacky Cheung 60+ Concert Tour
2024	6 April	Hong Kong	Jacky Cheung	The Jacky Cheung 60+ Concert Tour
2024	7 April	Hong Kong	Jacky Cheung	The Jacky Cheung 60+ Concert Tour
2024	12 April	Hong Kong	Jacky Cheung	The Jacky Cheung 60+ Concert Tour
2024	13 April	Hong Kong	Jacky Cheung	The Jacky Cheung 60+ Concert Tour
2024	14 April	Hong Kong	Jacky Cheung	The Jacky Cheung 60+ Concert Tour
2024	19 April	Hong Kong	Jacky Cheung	The Jacky Cheung 60+ Concert Tour
2024	20 April	Hong Kong	Jacky Cheung	The Jacky Cheung 60+ Concert Tour
2024	21 April	Hong Kong	Jacky Cheung	The Jacky Cheung 60+ Concert Tour
2024	25 July	Hong Kong	Andy Lau	Today … is the Day Tour
2024	26 July	Hong Kong	Andy Lau	Today … is the Day Tour
2024	27 July	Hong Kong	Andy Lau	Today … is the Day Tour
2024	28 July	Hong Kong	Andy Lau	Today … is the Day Tour
2025	16 August	Taiwan (ROC)	Cyndi Wang	Sugar High World Tour
2025	17 August	Taiwan (ROC)	Cyndi Wang	Sugar High World Tour

== Baseball field ==
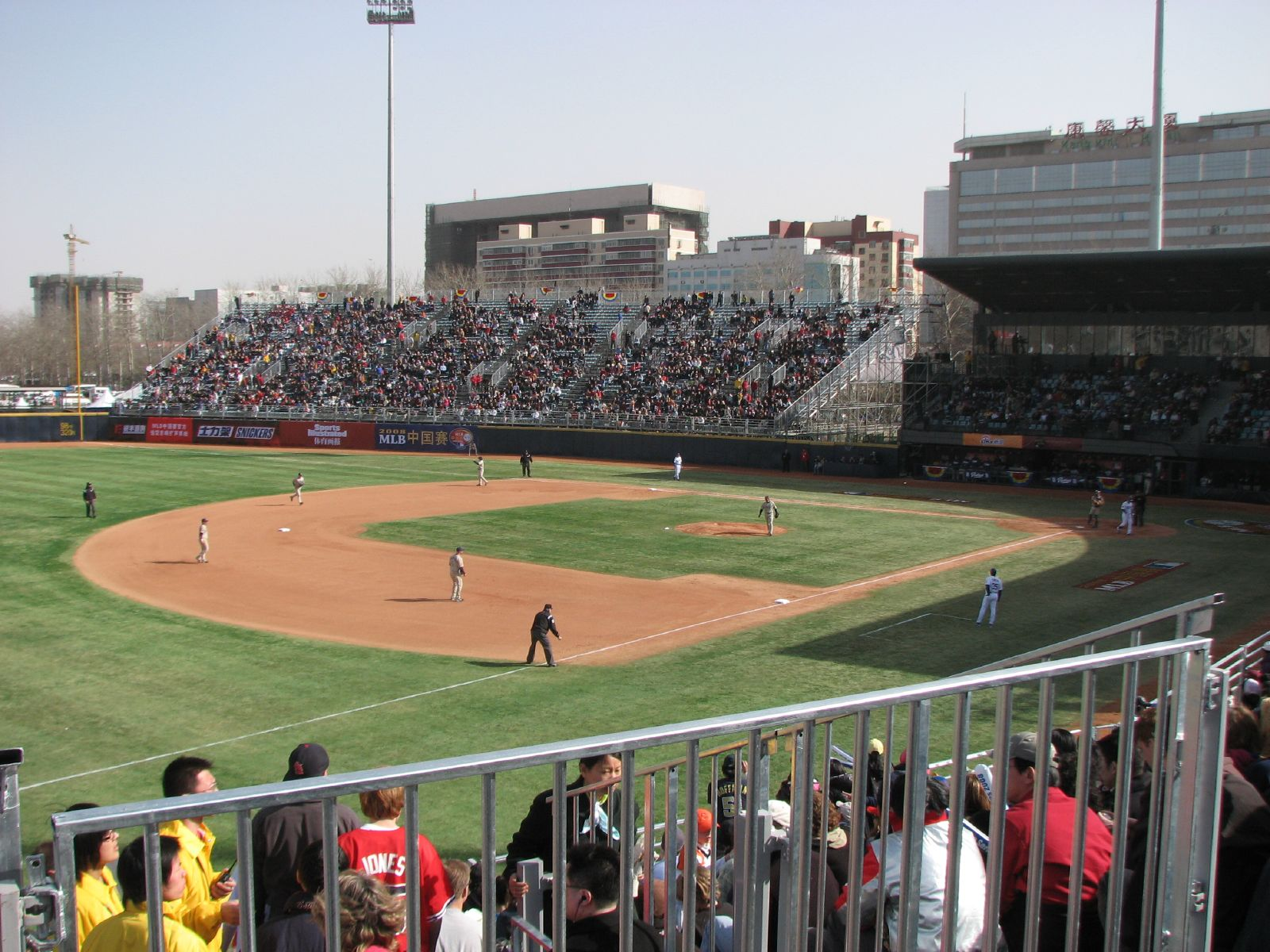
The baseball field during the MLB China Series in 2008.

The Wukesong Baseball Field (simplified Chinese: 五棵松棒球场; traditional Chinese: 五棵松棒球場; pinyin: Wǔkēsōng Bàngqiúchǎng) was a baseball stadium located next to the Wukesong Indoor Stadium at the Wukesong Culture and Sports Centre in Beijing, China. It was one of the nine temporary venues at the 2008 Summer Olympics, hosting baseball events.

The baseball field had a total land surface of 12,000 square metres and a capacity of 15,000. It included two competition fields and one training field.

In March 2008, the stadium hosted two games between the Los Angeles Dodgers and San Diego Padres called the MLB China Series, marking the first time Major League Baseball teams played in China.

The venue hosted the baseball during the 2008 Summer Olympics Team USA clinched the bronze medal, while South Korea beat Cuba to claim the gold medal. After the Olympic Games ended, the facilities were demolished as planned, for a shopping mall called Bloomage LIVE · HI-UP.

== See also ==
- List of indoor arenas in China
- List of basketball arenas

Events and tenants
Preceded by Palacio de Deportes de la Comunidad de Madrid; Madrid	FIBA World Cup; Final venue 2019	Succeeded by Mall of Asia Arena; Pasay
