= MeituPic =

Image editing software

Meitu XiuXiu ("Meitu")
- Type: Software
- Inventor: Wu Xinhong
- Inception: 2008; 18 years ago in Xiamen
- Manufacturer: Meitu, Inc.
- Website: xiuxiu.meitu.com

Meitu Xiu Xiu ("Meitu") (Chinese: 美图秀秀) is an image editing software that is mostly used in Mainland China but is also popular in Hong Kong and Taiwan. It is only available on Google Play and App Store in certain countries. It provides tools for editing photos: filters, retouching, collage, scenes, frames, and photo decorations, as well as generative AI features such as text-to-images, AI removal and AI repainting etc. Meitu is one of the apps developed by Meitu, Inc.; it also produced BeautyCam, Wink and X-Design.

== History ==
Meitu's PC version was created in 2008 by Wu Xinhong, the CEO of Meitu. In 2013, its mobile version became one of the first must-have mobile apps in China. Meitu, Inc. is a photo and video-centered app developer, which was founded in 2008 in Xiamen. Currently, the major revenue source of Meitu is premium subscription. Meitu, Inc. was initially funded by Cai Wensheng, a well-known angel investor. The company has an approximately 250 million monthly active users globally.

== Function ==
=== Edit ===
MeituPic provides a number of photo-editing tools. The major functions are auto enhance, edit, enhance, filters, frames, magic brush, mosaic, text, and blur.

Auto enhance focuses on the nature of photos taken, while Edit includes functions of cropping, rotation, sharpening, and adjustment of ratio. For Enhance, users can apply slight adjustment on the photo by controlling the levels of brightness, contrast, colour temperature, saturation, highlight, shadow and smart light. Major types of filters are LOMO, beauty, style as well as art. Different frames can be chosen from poster, simple, and fantasy. Magic brush provides a great variety of brushes with different colours and patterns for users to decorate the photos. Mosaic brush enables users to cover certain parts of the photo. Texts can be added to the photo. Choices of different bubbles, font as well as style of words are available. Blurring effect is also available to make the photo less distinct and clear.

=== Beauty Retouch ===
There are seven major functions for retouching a photo: automatic retouch, smooth and whiten skin, remove blemish, make slimmer, remove dark circles and bags under the eyes, make taller, and enhance the eyes.

Automatic retouch enhances portraits by lightening the skin tone, brightening the eyes, and simulating a face-lift by tapping on just one button. This helps to remove wrinkles and optimizes the skin tone. Acne, blemishes, and other skin imperfections can also be removed.

The face-lift and weight-loss functions in the slimming option can be used to reshape the body. The option to make the subject taller can be used to change the perceived height of the subject and give the impression of slimmer, longer legs. The option to enhance the eyes can enlarge and brighten the eyes.

=== Collage ===
Collage has four types: template, freestyle, poster, PicStrip, which all maximize to insert nine photos.

Template integrates photos in a vertical rectangle tightly. MeituPic has 15 frames or free download function for users. MeituPic also provides different templates according to number of photos inserted.

Freestyle separates photos on a background freely. There are two parts of background: custom and more. For custom, users choose from album. For more, there are plain and picture with 18 choices.

Poster makes a poster with photos. Users choose a poster among 8 choices or tap ‘more’ to download a new one.

PicStrip combines photos vertically making an elongated file. Users choose a frame from 15 choices.

Pinching thumb and forefinger together or apart zooms photos in/out. Putting two fingers and turning hand rotates photos. Pressing moves photos to ideal location. After designing, users tap ‘save/share’ on the upper right corner and the photo made is saved into album automatically.

== Awards ==
Year	Award
2011	Most Popular Award from DuoTe
2011	Excellent Software Award, Users’ Choices, Editors’ Choices from HuaJun
2012	Selection of Top Ten Software from Appstore
2012	Sixth of China Good Products from Business
