= Mike Tsang =

Hong Kong singer (born 1993)

- At Guangzhou Music Park in August 2026
- Born: Mike Tsang Pei-tak; 7 November 1993 (age 32); Shanwei, Guangdong, China
- Occupation: Singer
- Years active: 2019–present
- Musical career
- Origin: Hong Kong
- Genres: Cantopop; Mandopop; R&B; Rock; Swing
- Instruments: Vocals; Piano; Guitar
- Labels: UMG (2021–25); EEG (2025–present)

Chinese name
- Chinese: 曾比特
Transcriptions
Standard Mandarin
- Hanyu Pinyin: Zēng Bǐtè
Yue: Cantonese
- Jyutping: zang^{1} bei^{2} dak^{6}

Mike Tsang Pei-tak (Chinese: 曾比特; born 7 November 1993), better known simply as Mike, is a Hong Kong singer, who burst onto the music scene when his debut single "I Am Not Good Enough" (我不如) topped three of Hong Kong's five broadcaster music charts in 2021, a feat very few newcomers have accomplished. Debuting under the Universal Music Hong Kong label, Tsang went on to win several new artist awards, and in 2024, Outstanding Singer Awards in both the RTHK Top Ten Chinese Gold Songs Awards and Metro Radio Hits Music Awards ceremonies.

Tsang was able to break into the highly competitive non-Cantonese-speaking mainland China market when only in his second year, and in 2023, held his first concert tour spanning nine Chinese cities from Shanghai and Chengdu to the Greater Bay Area. In 2024, Tsang was further introduced to Southeast Asian and Taiwanese audiences when he sang for Wong Kar-wai's Blossoms Shanghai and TVB's Happily Ever After?, with both drama songs topping streaming charts for the first time in mainland China and Taiwan / Singapore / Malaysia respectively.

Tsang joined Emperor Entertainment Group in late 2025 and went on to take part in the opening ceremony of the 15th National Games of China. Tsang often represented Hong Kong in stage collaborations with singers from the mainland China, Taiwan and Macau. By 2026, he was regularly singing in Cantopop on Chinese national television, whether in CMG galas or top notch music shows such as Singer and Infinity and Beyond.

== Early life ==
Born in Shanwei City, Guangdong, China, Tsang is the youngest of three. The family moved to Hong Kong when he was around 6 and settled down in the Lower Ngau Tau Kok public housing estate, a government housing project for low-income families. With the passing of his father when Tsang was only 10 years old, his mother was forced to take on various jobs while bringing up three young children on her own. Times were hard and Tsang has often expressed admiration for his mother's tenacity and strength, as she allowed her children to pursue their dreams despite limited means.

Tsang's growing love for music began in secondary school, when he was invited into the school choir by his music teacher. He is a self-taught pianist and guitarist, and as a student, was constantly working odd jobs to pay for his singing lessons. Upon graduation from the Hong Kong Design Institute’s Digital Music and Media programme, Tsang worked as a sound engineer as well as a part-time singing instructor, alongside singing gigs at events, restaurants, weddings and shopping malls.

Since high school, Tsang has been a regular winner in the amateur singing competition circuit, with accolades including Open Group Champion in the HKSAR 20th anniversary Galaxy Rising Star Singing Contest in 2017, as well as in the 2017 Hong Kong i-SiNG championship, whereupon he represented Hong Kong in the i-SiNG World Singing Competition in Yangon, ultimately placing fourth in the finals.

== Music career ==
=== 2019–2021: Initial success ===
Tsang came into the public eye in the 2019 ViuTV reality competition show King Maker II. Despite finishing eighth, his singing and personality caught the attention of music producer and composer Eric Kwok, who introduced him to sign up with Universal Music Hong Kong in 2020.

On 8 January 2021, Tsang released his debut single "I Am Not Good Enough" (我不如), which shot to No. 1 in three of Hong Kong's five broadcaster charts (Commercial Radio's Ultimate Song Chart; TVB's Jade Solid Gold Song Chart and ViuTV's Chill Club Music chart), while placing second in the fourth (RTHK Chinese Gold Song chart). One year later, when Billboard launched the Hits of the World charts for Hong Kong Songs in February 2022, "I Am Not Good Enough" was charting at No. 17.

In December 2021, Tsang was awarded Best Male Newcomer (Bronze) in Commercial Radio's Ultimate Song Chart Awards Presentation 2021, and subsequently in July 2022 (delayed due to pandemic), Best Male Newcomer (Gold) in the Hong Kong Gold Songs Award Presentation Ceremony 2021/2022 jointly organised by TVB and RTHK, with "I Am Not Good Enough" earning him his first Top 10 Gold Song Award.

=== 2022: Introduction to Chinese audiences ===
Tsang was selected to participate in a major mainland China reality singing competition Infinity and Beyond (Cantopop Season) which was jointly produced by Hong Kong's TVB and China's Mango TV/Hunan Television, who invited him to join their signature reality show Call Me by Fire (season 2), thereby introducing him to non-Cantonese speaking Chinese audiences nationwide.

Infinity and Beyond

Tsang's surprise win in Episode 1 of Infinity and Beyond (where his cover of Samantha Lam's 1984 hit "First Love" (初戀) was voted top performance among all 16 participants who included veterans George Lam, Sally Yeh, Hacken Lee, Li Jian, Miriam Yeung and Coco Lee), coupled with his lively personality; afro hairstyle, and most notably his singing prowess, made him into one of the most exciting breakout stars of the series. As a result, Tsang became popular in China, especially in the Cantonese-speaking regions in the south. His Weibo follower count shot up from 3,500 fans before start of show in April 2022 to break 1 million in July. "First Love" recorded 1.4 million views on the official YouTube channels within 2 weeks of posting, making it one of Mango TV's most popular stage performances of the year.

Infinity and Beyond was aired over mainstream TV in both Hong Kong and mainland China, and by the end of 13 episodes, recorded an accumulated viewership count of 160 million people, not including online release. As of June 2024, online viewership at the Mango TV platform has exceeded 210 million on average for each episode of the season.

Call Me by Fire 2

Call Me by Fire (season 2) would prove to be a greater challenge. Invited to join on the back of his previous success, Tsang had by far the least experience among all participants in the show's history. When filming began in June 2022, he had only debuted less than 18 months before. Compared to the other seasoned musicians and performers including veteran superstars like Alex To, Richie Ren, Vanness Wu, Alec Su etc., Tsang was almost an unknown to non-Cantonese speaking audiences at the start of show. In a contest where audience popularity voting was the determining factor, he was able to impress sufficiently with his few performances, and avoided elimination to reach the finals. Although he could not make the final selection, Tsang called this a highly rewarding experience, both in terms of personal growth and friendships with fellow contestants who were top tier performers and musical minds in their own right.

Call Me by Fire (season 2), broadcast online via the Mango TV platform, had an audience reach nationwide, with Episode 1 alone recording 171 million views on the first day of upload (more than 10% of the entire nation's population). As of June 2024, online viewership at the Mango TV platform has exceeded 310 million on average for each episode of the season.

First Solo Album, Solo Concert and CCTV Galas

In April 2022, Tsang's fifth Cantonese single "I'd Thought" (我以為) was released just ahead of the Infinity and Beyond broadcast, and eventually took the top spot in the RTHK Chinese Gold Song chart in Hong Kong, as well as Music FM Radio Guangdong's Cantopop weekly chart (粵語歌曲排行榜) and the Chinese Music Awards Weekly Ranking (華語金曲榜) in mainland China. One week later, "Run On!" (奔跑吧！) was re-released in Mandarin and reached No.1 on the nationwide Music Pioneer chart (音樂先鋒榜) in China.

Tsang published his first studio album MIKE on 18 May 2022. Accumulated sales topped the Hong Kong Record Merchants Association Best Selling Album chart for 3 consecutive weeks, making him the third best selling local artist of the year, sharing the spot jointly with G.E.M and the late Leslie Cheung.

On 19 and 27 August 2022 respectively, Tsang held his first ever solo concerts "Mike 2022 MULTIFACETED" (曾比特2022點亮多面精彩音樂會) at live houses in Guangzhou and Foshan, both nights fully sold out.

On 10 September 2022, Tsang was invited to perform in 2 separate events on China Central Television (CCTV) to celebrate the Mid-Autumn Festival, namely, the annual CMG Mid-Autumn Festival Gala (the Mid-Autumn equivalent to the Spring Festival Gala), and the China Movie Channel (CCTV-6) Mid-Autumn Online Gala show (「明月知我」閩江之心中秋電影雲歌會). Both events were televised nationwide. This was a huge honour for the young singer who had only started out in the Mainland less than five months before.

Return to Hong Kong

Tsang returned to Hong Kong in November 2022 and released his new single, the slow swing "Hello Again" (重見) on 2 December. This song became his second Hong Kong triple chart-topper after "I Am Not Good Enough" (我不如), at the same time reaching the No.1 spot in the Music FM Radio Guangdong's Cantopop weekly chart and the Chinese Music Awards Weekly Ranking in Mainland China, as well as the Sing Tao A1 Pop Chart in Canada. When asked about his plans going forward, Tsang had indicated at that time that he hoped to focus equally on both Cantonese and Mandarin songs to cater to his fans from different areas.

Despite a 9-month absence from the Hong Kong music scene in 2022, many TVB viewers who watched the Hong Kong broadcast of Infinity and Beyond came to know Tsang favourably for the first time. Viewership count for the TVB broadcast averaged 1.18 million per episode and Tsang was able to expand his listener base as a result. At year-end, he won the Buzz New Male Singer Award in the 2022 Yahoo! Asia Multiverse Buzz Awards, as well as Best Breakthrough Singer in the Metro Radio Hits Music Awards 2022, while "I'd Thought" (我以為) bagged the Top 10 Hit Songs of the Year award.

=== 2023–2025: National performances and Overseas markets ===
In spite of his breakout in the Chinese market in 2022, the next three years were relatively quiet for Tsang as a solo recording artist, with only one original song published each year. Other than a few compilation projects spearheaded by his record label, this period was characterized by live performances rather than music output. Universal Music Hong Kong (UMHK) had undergone significant changes between 2023 and 2024: from new senior management to a shift in market focus as well as corporate layoffs, and Tsang revealed in later interviews that the ensuing personnel changes had stalled almost all music production during that time. He also confirmed having completed recording of his second album in early 2025, but up until the end of his contract with UMG mid-year, said album was not published.

==== OST Covers ====
In late 2023, Tsang was picked by director Wong Kar-wai to sing for Blossoms Shanghai, Wong's first directed television drama series. A total of 57 Chinese golden oldies were featured throughout the series, out of which four were specially re-recorded by selected young artistes. Tsang covered two of the four songs, namely Su Rui's "Looking Back Again" (再回首) and Danny Chan's "Desire" (一生何求). Blossoms Shanghai first aired nationwide in China on CCTV-8, CCTV-1, SMG Dragon TV, Tencent Video and Jiangsu Television between December 2023 and January 2024, followed by Hong Kong's TVB and Taiwan Mobile's MyVideo channel in 2024, and across Europe, Latin America, India, Korea, North America, UK, Ireland, Australia and New Zealand via MUBI, Filmin, SBS F!L UHD and The Criterion Channel in 2025.

In January 2024, Tsang's version of "Looking Back Again" was digitally released across Greater China, Singapore and Malaysia. One week later, it topped the Hong Kong chart in QQ Music and KuGou, China's two largest music streaming sites, and thereafter rose to the No.1 spot in the CMG Radio The Greater Bay Station's China Original Gold Songs Chart as well as other smaller-scale provincial level music charts across the Mainland. Upon publication of the Blossoms Shanghai OST compilation album in June, "Desire" (一生何求) went on to top several provincial level Chinese radio charts as well.

In March 2024, Tsang's cover of Mavis Hee's "The Fallen City" (傾城) was published. Used as the theme song for the TVB drama Happily Ever After?, "The Fallen City" helped to propel Tsang outside of mainland China and Hong Kong, taking top spot for the first time in both KKBOX Singapore and KKBOX Malaysia's Top Cantonese New Singles Charts, KKBOX Singapore's Top Cantonese Weekly Singles Chart, while reaching No.2 in KKBOX Taiwan's Top Cantonese New Singles Charts.

==== Original Songs ====
In December 2023, one year after his previous single, new song "Magic Carpet" (魔氈) was released, and clinched the top spot in TVB's Jade Solid Gold Song Chart and Music FM Radio Guangdong's Cantopop weekly chart. Tsang was also able to break into China National Radio's Mandopop dominant charts with the Cantonese language "Magic Carpet", reaching No.3 in both CMG Radio The Greater Bay Station's China Original Gold Songs Chart (華夏原創金曲榜) and the nationwide CNR Music Radio Station's China Music Billboard (中國Top排行榜).

In November 2024, Tsang's first original Mandarin R&B single "Talk To Me" was released world-wide. One week later, "Talk To Me" charted directly at No.1 for two weeks consecutively on the Metro Radio Mandopop Power Ranking chart (新城國語力排行榜), while taking top spot on CMG Radio The Greater Bay Station's China Original Gold Songs Chart; the nationwide Music Pioneer chart and the KuGou Hong Kong chart, as well as provincial level Chinese music charts, at the same time.

In January 2025, the second Mandopop single "Wellbeing" (養分) was released, and went on to top the charts in Hong Kong, Mainland China, and for the first time, in Malaysia (MY FM radio station), while breaking into the Top 5 in Taiwan (AsiaFM station) and Canada (Singtao A1 Chinese radio station).

==== Notable Live Performances ====
In June 2023, Tsang kicked off his first livehouse/hall tour in China. Running over seven months, Mike on shuttle Concert Tour (曾比特穿梭巡迴音樂會) covered ten stops spanning nine cities from the Greater Bay Area to Shanghai and Chengdu. Tickets for the first stop in Guangzhou were snatched up within hours and all but one stop was sold out for the entire tour, including 3240 seats for the finale which was held in the famous Zhongshan Memorial Hall in Guangzhou.

During this period, Tsang was regularly making live stage performances at major events, concerts and galas in Hong Kong, Macau and mainland China. The most prominent among these were the national performances for China Central Television (CCTV), which included the CMG Spring Festival Gala (2025); CMG Mid-Autumn Festival Gala (2024); CMG Lantern Festival Gala (2025); the annual Classics Night (2025); Sail Away Greater Bay Area New Year Gala (揚帆遠航大灣區音樂會) (2023; 2025) and "Full Moon Rising" Greater Bay Area Film Concert (「灣區升明月」大灣區電影音樂晚會) (2023–2025).

Tsang also represented Hong Kong in a number of CCTV events, firstly in September 2024, at his second CMG Mid-Autumn Festival Gala, when he performed with mainland China's Zhang Yinxi, Taiwan's Kenji Wu and Macau's Choi Kou School Choir. Then, the following year in September 2025, with his third Greater Bay Area Film Concert, he sang with Su Xing from the Mainland; Ele Yan from Taiwan and Andrew Kong from Macau.

On 7 September 2024, Tsang was invited to give the first public rendition of "Blooming into the Future" (盛開到未來), the official song for the 25th anniversary of Macau SAR, in the CMG Greater Bay Area Media Showcase press conference (「勇立潮頭大灣區」中央廣播電視總台系列融媒體行動發佈會). He also starred in the official music video released in December, which, according to the China National Radio Greater Bay station, recorded over 10 million accumulated views within a week. On 19 October, he embarked on his first overseas performance after debut, for Malaysia's MY FM radio station's anniversary celebration, MY FM BIG SHOW, at the Genting Highlands.

2025 started for Tsang with the 4 major CMG galas for the New Year: Sail Away Greater Bay Area–2025 New Year Gala on 1 January; 2024 Classics Night on 23 January; 2025 CMG Spring Festival Gala on 28 January, and CMG Lantern Festival Gala 2025 (中央廣播電視總台元宵晚會2025) on 12 February. He was the only Hong Kong singer to perform in all 4 events in 2025.

At the same time, Tsang's participation in mainland Chinese music reality TV shows drew a lot of attention. In 2023, he joined the SMG flagship singing competition, Singing with Legends (aka Our Song 我們的歌), pairing up with singers Harlem Yu, Michael Wong, A-Lin and Alex To. In 2024, he returned to Mango TV/Hunan Television to take part in the live telecast singing competition The Next Singer (下一戰歌手). In 2025, he competed in a series of outdoor concerts around the country for the Zhejiang TV–Youku collaboration "Shining Summer". Tsang's performances created such an impression that several of his solo and collaborated live renditions shot to the top of China's KuGou Hong Kong/Taiwan Song Charts after the shows.

==== Awards and Accolades ====
In December 2023, Tsang was voted the Media Choice Male Singer of the Year in the 20th Asian Music Festival in Shenzhen. Later the same month, "Round & Round" (旋轉拍賣), one of his collaborations with Kira Chan from UMHK's compilation album SING OUTSIDE THE BOX was crowned Best Song by a Duo or Group in the Metro Radio Hits Music Awards 2023.

2024 brought more awards and accolades:

- On 17 June, Tsang's "Looking Back Again" was awarded Best Television Series OST of the Year (年度電視劇金曲) in the first China Film and Television Music Festival, the music event of the 2024 Shanghai International Film and Television Festivals.
- On 23 June, Tsang earned his first major personal accolade – the Outstanding Singer Award at the 45th Top Ten Chinese Gold Songs Awards ceremony in Hong Kong, with "Magic Carpet" bagging him his second Top Ten Gold Song Award from RTHK.
- One week later, on 30 June, the 15th Chinese Music Awards announced Tsang's "Hello Again" a winner of the Top 10 Cantonese Songs Award, with Tsang himself named Favourite Male Singer for Hong Kong, joining Jay Chou for Taiwan, Zhou Shen for mainland China and Victor Wong for overseas regions.
- Then on 25 September, he received the Most Anticipated Singer of the Year Award in his first Weibo Music Awards 2024.
- Finally, "Talk To Me" took the Best Mandarin Song (Gold) Award and Tsang the Top Ten Outstanding Singer Award at the Metro Radio Hits Music Awards 2024 on 28 December.

In contrast, 2025 was a relatively quiet year for Tsang, as his recording contract with UMG came to an end. This year, he brought home his second Outstanding Singer Award from RTHK, with "Talk To Me" picking up a Top Ten Gold Song award in the 46th Top Ten Chinese Gold Songs Awards ceremony in Hong Kong on 2 June.

=== 2026 to Present: EEG; the National Games and Cantopop ===
On 7 November 2025, his 32nd birthday, Tsang officially announced the Emperor Entertainment Group (EEG) as his new record label. Reports of the changeover had emerged as early as September, causing widespread discussion among media and netizens at that time.

Two days later, on 9 November, he took part in the Opening Ceremony of the 15th National Games of China, where, on behalf of the three host cities, he teamed up with Joey Yung for Hong Kong, together with singers from Guangdong and Macau, to perform "The Dragon Soars over Lingding Channel" (龍騰伶仃洋), an official song of the Games.

For Tsang, 2026 todate is characterized by a renewed focus on Cantopop. The year started with his rendition of the 15th National Games anthem "Unstoppable" (氣勢如虹) in Cantonese at the Sail Away Greater Bay Area–2026 New Year Gala (揚帆遠航大灣區—2026新年音樂會) on 1 January, collaborating with Taiwan's Will Liu who sang the Mandarin version. In the same month, he returned to the Mango TV/Hunan Television Infinity and Beyond series as a visiting guest for the Mandopop season, where he performed a Cantonese and a Minnan language duet respectively with Jess Lee and Harlem Yu, to glowing reviews. The editorial at the Nanfang Daily entertainment news site "SouthYule" described his performance as "the main highlight of the show" (節目最大的看點); "breathtaking" (驚艷) and "daring to push the limits" (敢去突破).

On 9 January, original song "Cold Plunge" (雪出個未來) was published. This was Tsang's first release under the EEG label and his first Cantopop single in more than two years. "Cold Plunge" became the most played song on Metro Radio in Week 4 of 2026, and went on to record the first Hong Kong 4 chart-topper for Tsang, reaching No.1 on the Metro Radio Hit Hong Kong chart; the RTHK Chinese Gold Song chart; Commercial Radio Ultimate Song chart; ViuTV Chill Club Music chart, and also the Canadian Chinese Pop Music Chart from Fairchild Radio Canada; New York's WZRC M Chinese Song chart, as well as Malaysia's MY FM Music 20. On 23 January, Tsang held his first ever concert in Hong Kong "YouTube Music Nights Live X Mike Tsang 曾比特" on the open-air Ocean Terminal Deck.

In February 2026, Tsang took part in the 2026 CMG Spring Festival Gala again, this time in both the penultimate and finale programmes: firstly with the only Cantopop song of the evening, "Blessing You" (祝福你), followed by his second year in the traditional finale performance "A Night to Remember" (難忘今宵). Within the same month, Tsang sang solo for the first time in a CCTV gala, in the "2026 Sichuan New Year Concert" (2026四川省新年音樂會) organised jointly by CMG and the Sichuan Government; sang as Special Guest for the China kickoff of the global esports tournament, the 2026 Valorant Champions Tour, in Guangzhou, and headlined the finale act in the Macau Parade for Celebration of the Year of the Horse.

His second Cantonese single "CHANGE" was released in April and shot to No.1 in the RTHK Chinese Gold Song chart; TVB Jade Solid Gold Song chart; Kugou Hong Kong Chart; Music FM Radio Guangdong Cantopop weekly chart; New York WZRC M Chinese Song chart, and Malaysia's MY FM Music 20. The following month, Tsang once again sang for a television drama, namely the original insert song "Asking the Sword" (問劍) for Zhan Zhao Adventures (雨霖鈴), a CCTV-Youku collaboration, broadcast simultaneously via CCTV, Youku and Disney+ to over 110 countries and regions world-wide.

On 3 and 4 May 2026, Emperor Group held a two-day 25+ EEG Family Concert at the Kai Tak Stadium, in celebration of their 25th anniversary. Tsang was part of the "Featured Lineup" (領軍陣容) with top stars Nicholas Tse, Joey Yung, Leo Ku, Twins, Hins Cheung, Hacken Lee, Priscilla Chan, Kenny Kwan and Gin Lee. He was tasked with showcasing the record label's rock bands on 3 May, together with his own solo performance and a cross-generational collaboration with Hacken Lee on both days.

2026 also saw Tsang expand his role into music composition, with the release of his first co-written piece "The Insta-lie Club" in May, for fellow EEG singer Arvin Tsang. Tsang's original melody was selected through blind focus group demo sessions, and then handpicked by famed songwriter Wyman Wong who also penned the lyrics for the song.

== Controversy ==
Tsang emerged on the Hong Kong music scene at a time of unprecedented social unrest and a polarised society where businesses, media, and even artistes were often discerned according to presumed rather than actual affiliations. Young locals generally associated ViuTV with social activism and a stance against establishment, which in turn, they deemed was historically represented by TVB. As a finalist of ViuTV's King Maker II, Tsang was attacked by netizens for appearing on both TV stations. Despite having been passed over by ViuTV before joining Universal Music Hong Kong and thereby not a ViuTV artist, he was accused of "double dipping" and "betrayal" by ViuTV supporters, and, as a newcomer, was the main target of criticism, amid the many singers who also appear on both stations and in the mainland. When he was selected in the Infinity and Beyond auditions, young netizens further turned their wrath on him for performing in the mainland and filled his social media with politically fuelled attacks.

When asked to respond to the criticism, the young artiste said, "As a singer, my goal is to reach people with my music, and to let them get to know who Mike Tsang is. What I can do now is to make good use of whichever platform becomes available, so as to tell more people about my work. That's good enough for me. (When asked about reappearing on ViuTV) I'd take any opportunity given to me as long as it's fun."

Both ViuTV and TVB are indirect Chinese state investments (ViuTV of China Unicom via PCCW, and TVB of China Media Capital).

== Discography ==
=== Albums ===
Album #	Title	Type	Label	Release Date	Remarks	Tracklist
1st	MIKE	Studio Album	Universal Music Hong Kong	18 May 2022	HKRMA Best-selling Album (3 weeks)	Songs: 1. 我不如 "I Am Not Even"; 2. 我不是邱比特 "I Am Not Cupid"; 3. 新年快樂 "Happy New Year"; 4. 奔跑吧 "Run On!"; 5. 我以為 "I'd Thought"; 6. 初戀 "First Love"; 7. 奔跑吧!(ONE PROMISE合唱版) "Run On!(Duet)"; 8. 我不是邱比特(JC合唱版) "I Am Not Cupid(Duet)"; 9. 奔跑吧!(國語版) "Run On!(Mandarin)"; 10. 手望 (Gin Lee守望合唱版~Chill Club live version) (BonusTrack); 11. 娛樂人生 (Chill Club live version) (BonusTrack); 12. Yes & No (Chill Club live version) (BonusTrack)

=== Singles ===
==== As main artist ====
Release Date	Title	Album	Peak chart position					Notes (only top 5 for other major charts shown)
Release Date	Title	Album	CR903	RTHK	Metro	TVB	ViuTV	Notes (only top 5 for other major charts shown)
2021
8 January	"I Am Not Good Enough" (我不如)	MIKE	1	2	×	1	1	First HK triple chart-topper / Debut Song: MusicFM Guangdong Cantopop Chart: 1; Chinese Music Awards Weekly Ranking: 2
21 May	"I Am No Cupid" (我不是邱比特)	MIKE	16	1	×	2	–	MusicFM Guangdong Cantopop Chart: 4; Canadian Chinese POP Music Chart: 5
12 October	"Run On!" (奔跑吧!)	MIKE	2	2	–	–	–	MusicFM Guangdong Cantopop Chart: 2; Chinese Music Awards Weekly Ranking: 5
2022
19 January	"Happy New Year" (新年快樂)	MIKE	–	10	2	3	–	MusicFM Guangdong Cantopop Chart: 2; Canadian Chinese POP Music Chart: 3; New York WZRC M Chinese Song Chart: 4
22 April	"I'd Thought" (我以為)	MIKE	–	1	2	×	×	MusicFM Guangdong Cantopop Chart: 1; Chinese Music Awards Weekly Ranking: 1; CNR Music Radio China Music Billboard: 2; New York WZRC M Chinese Song Chart: 4
29 April	"Run On!" (Mandarin) 奔跑吧!(國語版)	MIKE	x	x	x	x	x	Music Pioneer Chart: 1
24 June	"My Father's Watch" (手錶)	–	×	1	×	×	×	RTHK movie "OnSet2022" insert song: Canadian Chinese POP Music Chart: 1
2 December	"Hello Again" (重見)	–	–	1	1	1	–	HK Triple chart-topper: MusicFM Guangdong Cantopop Chart: 1; Chinese Music Awards Weekly Ranking: 1; Canada Sing Tao A1 Pop Chart: 1
2023
8 December	"Magic Carpet" (魔氈)	–	–	2	2	1	x	MusicFM Guangdong Cantopop Chart: 1; CMG China Original Gold Songs Chart: 3; CNR Music Radio China Music Billboard: 3; Canada Sing Tao A1 Pop Chart: 5
2024
18 January	"Looking Back Again" (Mandarin) (再回首)	–	–	–	–	–	x	Cover version of the Su Rui song "Blossoms Shanghai" drama insert song: QQ Music Hong Kong Chart: 1; KuGou Hong Kong Chart: 1; CMG China Original Gold Songs Chart: 1; Chinese Music Awards Weekly Ranking: 2; Music Pioneer Chart: 3
1 March	"The Fallen City" (傾城)	-	x	x	x	3	x	Cover version of the Mavis Hee song TVB Happily Ever After? drama theme song: KKBox Singapore Top Cantonese Weekly Singles Chart: 1; Line Today Hong Kong Song Chart: 3
15 November	"Talk To Me" (Mandarin)	–	–	2	(1)	8	x	QQ Music Hong Kong Chart: 2; KuGou Hong Kong Chart: 1; CMG China Original Gold Songs Chart: 1; Music Pioneer Chart, China: 1; CNR Music Radio China Music Billboard: 3; Chinese Music Awards Weekly Ranking: 3
2025
20 January	"Wellbeing" (Mandarin) (養分)	–	–	1	1	2	x	QQ Music Hong Kong Chart: 1; KuGou Hong Kong Chart: 2; Chinese Music Awards Weekly Ranking: 2; CNR Music Radio China Music Billboard: 4; Canada Sing Tao A1 Pop Chart: 5; Malaysia MY FM Music 20: 1; Malaysia 988 FM Hits Ranking Chart: 4; Taiwan Asia FM DJ Top 5 Chinese Songs: 2
2026
9 January	"Cold Plunge" (雪出個未來)	–	1	1	1	–	1	First HK 4 chart-topper: KuGou Hong Kong Chart: 3; Beijing Music Radio Chinese Song Chart: 2; Canadian Chinese POP Music Chart: 1; Canada Sing Tao A1 Pop Chart: 1; Malaysia MY FM Music 20: 1; Malaysia 988 FM Hits Ranking Chart: 5; New York WZRC M Chinese Song Chart: 1; Line Today Hong Kong Song Chart: 2
8 April	"CHANGE"	–	6	1	–	1	–	KuGou Hong Kong Chart: 1; MusicFM Guangdong Cantopop Chart: 1; CNR Music Radio China Music Billboard: 2; Canadian Chinese POP Music Chart: 5; Canada Sing Tao A1 Pop Chart: 5; San Francisco Sing Tao Billboard: 5; Malaysia MY FM Music 20: 1; Malaysia 988 FM Hits Ranking Chart: 4; New York WZRC M Chinese Song Chart: 1
10 July	"No Caller ID" (你所打的號碼暫時未能接通)	–	10	7*	11*	–	–	KuGou Hong Kong Chart: 2; MusicFM Guangdong Cantopop Chart: 4*; CNR Music Radio China Music Billboard: 2*; Line Today Hong Kong Song Chart: 1*

==== Compilations ====
Release Date	Title	Album	Peak chart position					Notes
Release Date	Title	Album	CR903	RTHK	Metro	TVB	ViuTV	Notes
10 February 2023	"Awareness" (有誰共鳴)	Remembering Leslie	–	2	–	1	–	Cover version of the late Leslie Cheung's song: Chinese Music Awards Weekly Ranking: 3; CNR Music Radio China Music Billboard: 5
21 June 2024	"Desire" (一生何求)	繁花 The Original Music; and Soundtrack of; Blossoms Shanghai	-	-	4	-	-	Cover version of the Danny Chan song "Blossoms Shanghai" drama insert song: MusicFM Guangdong Cantopop Chart: 4; Chinese Music Awards Weekly Ranking: 2

==== Collaborations ====
Release Date	Title	Album	Peak chart position					Notes
Release Date	Title	Album	CR903	RTHK	Metro	TVB	ViuTV	Notes
9 July 2021	"I Am No Cupid" (Duet) 我不是邱比特(合唱版)	MIKE	–	–	×	–	7	With Jennifer Chan
15 November 2021	"Run On!" (Duet version) 奔跑吧! (Duet version)	MIKE	x	x	x	x	x	With ONE PROMISE (band); Digital release only
27 September 2023	"Round & Round" (旋轉拍賣)	Sing Outside the Box	–	–	4	x	x	With Kira Chan
27 September 2023	"Wicked Connection" (接觸不良)	Sing Outside the Box	x	x	x	x	x	With Oscar Tao

- "-" denotes a recording that did not chart
- "x" denotes a recording that was not released to the station
- "*" denotes a recording that is still charting
- "(1)" denotes a chart-topper for two consecutive weeks

== Concerts ==
=== Solo concerts ===
Prior to 2023

Date	Event	Venue	Notes
2022
19 August	"Mike 2022 MULTIFACETED" – Guangzhou (曾比特2022點亮多面精彩音樂會—廣州站)	Guangzhou Central Station Rock House	First solo concert Full house
27 August	"Mike 2022 MULTIFACETED" – Foshan (曾比特2022點亮多面精彩音樂會—佛山站)	Foshan Beatles Music Live House	Full house

2023
Date	Event	Venue	Notes
17 June	"Mike on shuttle Concert Tour" (曾比特穿梭巡迴音樂會)*	Guangzhou Central StationRock House	sold out
23 June	"Mike on shuttle Concert Tour" (曾比特穿梭巡迴音樂會)*	Foshan Nanhai Theatre	sold out
25 August	"Mike on shuttle Concert Tour" (曾比特穿梭巡迴音樂會)*	Shenzhen NuBond LiveHouse	sold out
16 September	"Mike on shuttle Concert Tour" (曾比特穿梭巡迴音樂會)*	Shanghai MAO LiveHouse	sold out
23 September	"Mike on shuttle Concert Tour" (曾比特穿梭巡迴音樂會)*	Zhuhai DIALOGUE SPACE	sold out
21 October	"Mike on shuttle Concert Tour" (曾比特穿梭巡迴音樂會)*	Dongguan Orange Dongcheng Theatre	sold out
11 November	"Mike on shuttle Concert Tour" (曾比特穿梭巡迴音樂會)*	Shunde Performing Arts; Centre Theatre	sold out
18 November	"Mike on shuttle Concert Tour" (曾比特穿梭巡迴音樂會)*	Chengdu CH8 Livehouse Wanmei	sold out
24 December	"Mike on shuttle Concert Tour" (曾比特穿梭巡迴音樂會)*	Jiangmen Performance Arts Center, Qiaodu Grand Theatre	
2024
13 January	"Mike on shuttle Concert Tour" — Guangzhou finale (曾比特穿梭巡迴音樂會—廣州站收官場)	Guangzhou Zhongshan Memorial Hall	sold out
2026
23 January	"YouTube Music Nights Live; X Mike Tsang 曾比特"	Ocean Terminal Deck (open air)	free seating

=== Other major concerts and galas ===
Prior to 2026

Date	Event	Venue	Notes
2021
15 May	"Cantosongs 101 Silent Concert" (《廣東歌101》無聲演唱會)	Times Square, Causeway Bay	Solo and with AGA
29 May	"Community Chest Charity Show 2021"	TVB City, Tseung Kwan O	With Gin Lee, Kerryta Chau
7 August	"Gimme LiVe" 2021	Mira Place, Tsimshatsui	
20 August	"Jace Chan PROCESSED Concert"	Music Zone, KITEC	Guest
21 August	KKBox "Lossless Music Fiesta"	Stanley Plaza, Stanley	Solo and with Gin Lee
19 November	"TVB 54th Anniversary Gala"	TVB City, Tseung Kwan O	With various
28 November	"2021 Po Leung Kuk Gala Spectacular"	Hong Kong Coliseum, Hung Hom	With Gin Lee, MC Cheung
11 December	"Jace Chan UNBORDERED Concert"	Star Hall, KITEC	Guest
31 December	New TV "2021 Countdown Concert" (2021美麗的夜香港跨年演唱會)	Central Harbourfront Event Space	Solo and with George Lam, Vincy Chan
2022
7 June	Mango TV "Weekend Forest Concert" (《週末出片大會》森林音樂會)	Ranhou Forest Camping Grounds, Kaifu, Changsha	
28 June	CCTV China Movie Channel "Hong Kong SAR 25th Anniversary Commemorative Online Gala" (庆祝香港回归祖国25周年云歌会)	Online broadcast due to pandemic	With Gigi Yim
10 September	CCTV "2022 CMG Mid-Autumn Festival Gala"	Jiyang Lake Ecological Garden, Zhangjiagang, Suzhou	First CCTV Mid-Autumn Gala; With Isabelle Huang
10 September	CCTV China Movie Channel "Mid-Autumn Online Gala" (「明月知我」閩江之心中秋電影雲歌會)	Online broadcast due to pandemic	With Fan Shiqi
19 November	"TVB 55th Anniversary Gala"	TVB City, Tseung Kwan O	With Gigi Yim, Johnson Lee, Louis Yuen
3 December	"2022 Tung Wah Charity Gala Show"	TVB City, Tseung Kwan O	Solo and with Jasmine Yam
10 December	TVB "Infinity and Beyond 25th Anniversary Concert"	TVB City, Tseung Kwan O	Solo and with Kerryta Chau
2023
14 January	"2023 Yan Chai Charity Gala Show"	TVB City, Tseung Kwan O	
11 March	"2023 Pok Oi Charity Gala Show"	TVB City, Tseung Kwan O	Red Team Leader
17 March	CCTV "2023 Sail Away Greater Bay Area Gala" (2023揚帆遠航大灣區音樂會)	Guangzhou Nansha Port Phase 4 Cargo Terminal	With Ron Ng
18–19 March	"Andrew Lam 40 years Retrospective Concert (Part 2)" (蘇格蘭場今天星閃閃林敏驄暨車總腦交戰時日如飛40週年成人禮作品展演唱會之part2更精采)	AXA x WONDERLAND, West Kowloon Cultural District	(2 shows)
25 March	Youku-TVB "Memories Beyond Horizon All-stars Concert" (無限超越群星演唱會)	The Venetian Macao	
30 March	Music FM Radio Guangdong; "35th Music Pioneer Awards Press Event Concert"; (《音樂先鋒榜35載榮耀盛典》新聞發佈演唱會)	Guangzhou Haixinsha Asian Games Park	
1 April	Universal Music Hong Kong "Reminiscing Leslie Live Concert"	Hong Kong Convention and Exhibition Centre	Solo and with Gigi Yim
22 April	StarMac Entertainment "One Night in Zhaoqing 2023"	Zhaoqing Sports Center	
1–2 May	Wynn Macau "Special for You" Concerts	Wynn Macau and Wynn Palace	Solo and with Ron Ng (2 shows)
21 May	Hana Kuk "Hanafinity Concert 2023"	Star Hall, KITEC	Guest
3 June	"Community Chest Charity Show 2023"	TVB City, Tseung Kwan O	Solo and with Joyce Chu, DEZ
29 June	CCTV-6 China Movie Channel "The Greater Bay Area Film Concert 2023"	AsiaWorld–Arena	With Gigi Yim
8 July	"2023 Caritas Star Studded Charity Show"	TVB City, Tseung Kwan O	
27 August	TVB "Miss Hong Kong Pageant 2023"	TVB City, Tseung Kwan O	
3 November	TVB-SJM Resorts "Jardim Secreto Music Fiesta"	Grand Lisboa Palace Resort, Macau	Solo and with Gigi Yim
12 November	Foshan People's Government "2023 China-Foshan Greater Bay Area Kungfu Film Week Closing Ceremony and Music Night"	Foshan News and Media Center	
23 November	Manulife "Top Stars Music Show"	AsiaWorld–Expo Arena	
2 December	"20th Asian Music Festival"	Longhua Cultural and Sport Center, Shenzhen	
2024
27 January	"2024 Yan Chai Charity Gala Show"	TVB City, Tseung Kwan O	
9 February	HOY TV–Guangdong Radio and Television "Spring Festival Gala 2024" (龍騰灣區歡樂年)	West Kowloon Cultural District, Yunfu Jinshuitai Resort, Zhuhai Novotown	Solo and with Icely Cheung
2 March	"2024 Pok Oi Charity Gala Show"	TVB City, Tseung Kwan O	Solo and with Feanna Wong
30 April	FTLife "FTLife Beyond Your Imagination Concert" (富通保險超越您想音樂會)	Hong Kong Convention and Exhibition Centre	Solo and with Angela Hui
18 May	"The Infinite Bowie Wu Concert Show 2024" (修哥無限楓騷演唱會2024)	The Londoner Arena, Macau	Solo and with Bowie Wu
1 June	"Community Chest Charity Show 2024"	TVB City, Tseung Kwan O	
17 June	"2024 Shanghai International Film and Television Festivals – China Film and Television Music Festival"	Yunjian Culture and Art Center, Shanghai	
6 July	"2024 Caritas Star Studded Charity Show"	TVB City, Tseung Kwan O	Solo and with Yumi Chung and Jasmine Yam
10 August	"2024 Po Leung Kuk Gala Spectacular"	Hong Kong Convention and Exhibition Centre, Wanchai	
24 August	Metro Broadcast Corporation "Metro Radio 33rd Anniversary Show"	Hong Kong Convention and Exhibition Centre, Wanchai	
10 September	CMG "2024 CMG Mid-Autumn Festival Gala"	Dingxian Lake, Shenyang, Liaoning	With Zhang Yinxi, Kenji Wu
22 September	CCTV-6 China Movie Channel "The Greater Bay Area Film Concert 2024"	Galaxy International Convention Center, Macau	With Elaine Zhong
19 October	MY FM "MY FM BIG SHOW 2024"	Arena of Stars, Genting Highlands	First overseas concert Solo and with Nicole Lai
17 November	Bank of China (Hong Kong) "Beats of Eternity concert"	Sha Tin Racecourse, Sha Tin	Solo and with Joey Tang
7 December	Tung Wah Group of Hospitals "Tung Wah Charity Gala 2024"	TVB City, Tseung Kwan O	With Tung Wah Group Chairman Mandy Tang
2025
1 January	CMG "Sail Away Greater Bay Area; –2025 New Year Gala"; (揚帆遠航大灣區—2025新年音樂會)	Pearl River Delta, Shenzhen–Zhongshan Link West Artificial Island	With Zhang HeXuan
23 January	CMG "2024 Classics Night"	Beijing, CMG Headquarters	With Cecilia Han
28 January	CMG "2025 CMG Spring Festival Gala"	Beijing, CMG Headquarters (main venue)	First CMG Spring Festival Gala; With Hu Xia, Meng Jia, Lan Yingying, Ele Yan, Hailai Ahmu, Lars Huang and others
12 February	CMG "CMG Lantern Festival Gala 2025" (中央廣播電視總台元宵晚會2025)	Beijing, CMG Headquarters (main venue)	First CMG Lantern Festival Gala; Solo and with Laure Shang, Isabelle Huang, Vin Zhang, Ele Yen, Wu Xuanyi and Mickey Jiao
1 March	TWGHs 155th Anniversary Charity Dinner "The Dream of Tomorrow"	Rosewood Hong Kong	
16 March	Vivian Chow World Tour "A Long and Lasting Love"	Shanghai Indoor Stadium	Solo and with Vivian Chow
3 May	Modern Sky Entertainment "Super Strawberry Festival Dongguan 2025"	Dongguan Humen Park	
17 May	Janice Vidal "Out of Frame World Tour"	Zhanjiang Olympic Sports Center Complex	Solo and with Janice Vidal
20 September	Priscilla Chan "The Fabulous 40; Priscilla Live in Foshan"	GBA International Sports and Cultural Center	Solo and with Priscilla Chan
28 September	CCTV-6 China Movie Channel "The Greater Bay Area Film Concert 2025"	Galaxy International Convention Center, Macau	With Su Xing, Ele Yan and Andrew Kong
9 November	Guangdong, Hong Kong, Macau "2025 National Games of China"	Guangdong Olympic Stadium	First National Games; With Joey Yung, Liu Naiqi, Daze in White, Huang Zhiyi and Sun Yueqi
20 December	"2025 Jiu Cheng Le Hang Music Festival" (貢香九久2025酒城樂航音樂節)	Luzhou Lantian Airport, Sichuan	Solo

2026
Date	Event	Venue	Notes
1 January	CMG "Sail Away Greater Bay Area; –2026 New Year Gala"; (揚帆遠航大灣區—20265新年音樂會)	Zhuhai, Xiangzhou Port	With Will Liu
7 February	CMG, Sichuan Government "2026 Sichuan; New Year Concert and 2nd Original Song Gala"; (2026四川省新年音樂會暨第二屆原創歌曲盛典)	Sichuan Culture and Art Center	Solo
8 February	VALORANT "2026 Valorant Champions Tour (China kickoff)" (無畏巡迴·廣州站)	Guangzhou Canton Tower, West Square	Solo
16 February	CMG "2026 CMG Spring Festival Gala"	Beijing, CMG Headquarters (main venue)	Second CMG Spring Festival Gala; With Sofia Paiva, Liao Changyong, Tan Weiwei, Zhang Yinxi, Reno Wang and others
19 February	Macao Government Tourism Office "Parade for Celebration of the Year of the Horse"	Macau Sai Van Lake Square	Solo and with IdG Bubbles, Honey Punch
21 March	"Changshou Trans-Dimensional" Live Show (超時空演唱會 長壽站)	Chongqing Changshou District National Fitness Center Stadium	Solo
18 April	Linda Chung "Remember Linda Chung in concert"; Foshan Special Birthday Show; (《Remember記得‧鍾嘉欣演唱會》佛山生日限定場)	Foshan Lingnan Mingzhu Gymnasium	Solo and with Linda Chung
24 April	RTHK "The 47th Top Ten Chinese; Gold Songs Awards Concert"	East Kowloon Cultural Centre	Solo (special performing guest)
3–4 May	EEG "25+ EEG Family Concert"	Kai Tak Stadium	Solo and with Hacken Lee, SULIS, Locksmiths, Daze in White, The Lemon Ones
10 May	Priscilla Chan "The Fabulous 40; Priscilla Live in Zhengzhou"	Zhengzhou Olympic Sports Centre Stadium	Solo and with Priscilla Chan
30 May	bilibili "Forever 22! 2026 Bilibili Graduation Concert"	Guangzhou Higher Education Mega Center Stadium	Solo
11 July	"2026 Caritas Charity Gala"	TVB City, Tseung Kwan O	Solo
14 August	Po Leung Kuk "SHINE ON! Po Leung Charity Concert"	Hong Kong Coliseum	Solo

== Major television performances ==
Prior to 2026

Date	Event	Role	Notes
2019
30 September – 15 December	ViuTV "King Maker II"	Reality Show Contestant	First television appearance, before debut; Mondays to Fridays (for 10 weeks), Final held on 15 December
2022
24 April – 17 July	TVB – Mango TV – Hunan TV "Infinity and Beyond"	Regular Singer	First appearance in mainland China television; Every Monday, Thursday, Saturday, Sunday (for 13 weeks)
19 August – 4 November	Mango TV "Call Me by Fire season 2"	Reality Show Contestant	Every Thursday, Friday, Saturday (for 12 weeks)
2023
25 September – 13 October	TVB "I Want To $leep"	Reality Show Co-Host	First time hosting a reality TV series; Mondays to Fridays (for 3 weeks)
8 October – 17 December	Shanghai Dragon TV "Singing with Legends 5"	Regular Singer	Every Wednesday and Sunday (for 12 weeks)
25 November – 30 December	Nanfang Media Group (aka GDToday) "Singing in the Greater Bay Area"	Co-Host and Singer	Songwriting reality show; Every Saturday on TVB Jade (for 4 weeks, excluding 9 and 16 December)
2024
9 February	CCTV-1 "Bustling Tastes of the Chinese New Year" (龍騰虎躍·中國年味)	Singer	With Li Huizhen
9 February	CCTV-3 "Spring Gala awaits you" (春晚等着你)	Singer	
10 February	RTHKTV31 – Yunnan TV – Beijing TV "Chinese New Year Music Party for Year of the Dragon" (龍躍千里─甲辰年新春音樂派對)	Singer	Simulcast in Hong Kong, Kunming and Beijing
10 February	TVB "Po Leung Kuk Chinese New Year Special" (新春保良迎金龍)	Singer	
18 May	Guangxi Television "Folk Song Gala"	Singer and Creative Officer	Ep3: Mike Tsang Special
6 September – 2 November	Mango TV – Hunan TV "The Next Singer"	Singer-Contestant	Live broadcast singing competition; Every Friday and Saturday; Fridays Ep3, 6, 7, 8 (as contestant); Saturdays Ep1, 4, 5 (as contestant); Ep2, 5 (as co-host); Ep3 (as guest)
2025
28 January	CCTV-1 "Bustling Tastes of the Chinese New Year" (金蛇起舞▪中國年味)	Singer	With The Potato Kingdom (band)
29 January	TVB "Po Leung Kuk Chinese New Year Special" (新春保良迎金蛇)	Singer	
14 June –9 August	ZJTV – Youku "SHINING SUMMER (Season 2)"	Singer-Contestant	Every Saturday and Tuesday

2026
Date	Event	Role	Notes
8 January –17 January	Mango TV/Hunan Television "Infinity and Beyond·Mandopop Season" (聲生不息·華流季)	Guest Singer	Every Friday, Thursday, Saturday (for 2 weeks); Ep8: With Jess Lee; Ep9: With Harlem Yu
13 February	Zhejiang TV "The Good of China (Season 4)"	Culture buddy	Ep4: "A New Year Carnival – the Studious Five" (Intangible Cultural Heritage)

== Major awards ==
Year	Award Ceremony	Platform	Category	Name	Results	Notes
2021	Ultimate Song Chart Awards Presentation 2021	Commercial Radio	Best Male Newcomer (Bronze)	—N/a	Won	
2022	Hong Kong Gold Songs Award Presentation Ceremony 2021/2022	RTHK and TVB	Best Male Newcomer Awards (Gold)	—N/a	Won	
2022	Hong Kong Gold Songs Award Presentation Ceremony 2021/2022	RTHK and TVB	Top 10 Gold Song Awards	"I Am Not Even" 《我不如》	Won	
2022	Call Me by Fire (season 2)	Mango TV	Best Stage Performance	"Red Cloud Robe" 《紅雲袍》	3rd	
2022	2022 Yahoo! Asia Multiverse Buzz Awards	Yahoo! Asia	Buzz New Male Singer Awards	—N/a	Won	
2022	Metro Radio Hits Music Awards 2022	Metro Radio	Best Breakthrough Singer	—N/a	Won	
2022	Metro Radio Hits Music Awards 2022	Metro Radio	Top 10 Hit Songs of the Year	"I'd Thought" 《我以為》	Won	
2023	Tencent Wave Music Awards	Tencent Music	Best Cantonese Album	"MIKE"	Nominated	
2023	The 20th Asian Music Festival	AMF Organizing Committee	Media Choice Male Singer of the Year	—N/a	Won	
2023	Metro Radio Hits Music Awards 2023	Metro Radio	Best Song by Duo or Group	"Round & Round"	Won	
2024	China Film and Television Music Festival	CFA, CTAA, SIFF and STVF office, SMG	Best Television Series OST of the Year	"Looking Back Again"	Won	
2024	45th Top Ten Chinese Gold Songs Award	RTHK	Outstanding Singer Award	—N/a	Won	
2024	45th Top Ten Chinese Gold Songs Award	RTHK	Top 10 Gold Song Awards	"Magic Carpet" 《魔氈》	Won	
2024	15th Chinese Music Awards	International Chinese Music Union	Best Cantonese Male Singer	"MIKE"	Nominated	
2024	15th Chinese Music Awards	International Chinese Music Union	Top 10 Cantonese Songs Award	"Hello Again" 《重見》	Won	
2024	15th Chinese Music Awards	International Chinese Music Union	Favourite Male Singer (Hong Kong) Award	—N/a	Won	
2024	Weibo Music Awards 2024	Weibo	Most Anticipated Singer of the Year Award	—N/a	Won	
2024	Metro Radio Hits Music Awards 2024	Metro Radio	Top 10 Outstanding Singer	—N/a	Won	
2024	Metro Radio Hits Music Awards 2024	Metro Radio	Best Mandarin Song (Gold)	"Talk To Me"	Won	
2025	46th Top Ten Chinese Gold Songs Award	RTHK	Outstanding Singer Award	—N/a	Won	
2025	46th Top Ten Chinese Gold Songs Award	RTHK	Top 10 Gold Song Awards	"Talk To Me"	Won	
