= Dave Wang =

Singer-songwriter (born 1962)

- 王傑
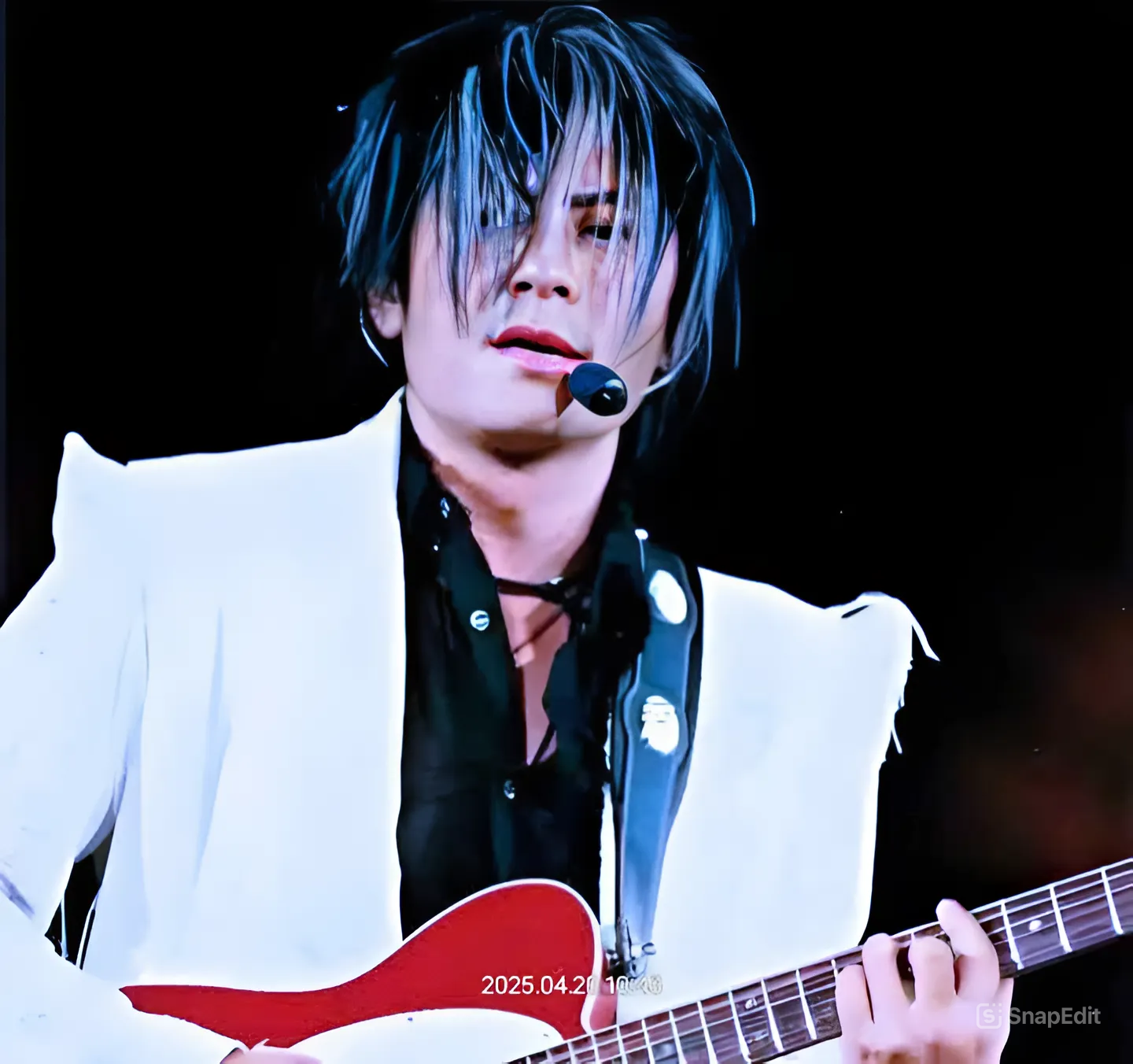
- Wang in 2025
- Born: 王大衛; 20 October 1962 (age 64); British Hong Kong
- Occupations: Singer; songwriter; actor
- Years active: 1987–present
- Spouses: Duan Anqi (m. 1981; div. 1984) Virginia Mok (m. 1993; div. 1997)
- Children: 2
- Parent(s): Wang Hsieh (father), Xu Yu (mother)
- Awards: Golden Horse Awards – Best Original Film Song; 1988 Yellow Story

Chinese name
- Traditional Chinese: 王傑
- Simplified Chinese: 王杰
Transcriptions
Standard Mandarin
- Hanyu Pinyin: wáng jié
Yue: Cantonese
- Jyutping: wong4 git6
- Musical career
- Also known as: Wang Chieh; Wong Kit; Dave Wong; Wang Jie
- Genres: Mandopop, Cantopop
- Instruments: Vocals, guitar, bass, piano, drums
- Labels: Hong Kong/Taiwan: UFO Records/Warner Music (1988–1995); Pony Canyon (1996–1998); Emperor Entertainment Group (1999–2009)

Dave Wang (traditional Chinese: 王傑; simplified Chinese: 王杰; pinyin: Wáng Jié; Wade–Giles: Wang Chieh; born 20 October 1962) is a singer-songwriter and actor.

== Life and career ==
Wang was born in British Hong Kong as the son of a former Shaw Brothers actor, Wang Hsieh. He moved to Taiwan when he was 17. Before landing his first record deal in 1988, Wang wrote songs for other singers under pen-names such as "Little Grass" and "Northern Wind". He worked as a Tae Kwon Do instructor, ice-skating coach, taxi-driver, delivery-man, waiter, bartender, and cook. He also spent three years in the Taiwanese military to obtain a Taiwan ID card, despite holding a Hong Kong British passport. His first marriage ended when his wife at the time left him while he was serving in the military.

Wang released his Chinese debut album, A Game A Dream (一場遊戲一場夢), which sold over 500,000-copies in December 1987, which was used as the theme song in the 1988 telemovie The Game They Call Sex. Another of his hits, "Bits of Sadness, Bits of Craze" (幾分傷心幾分痴), released in 1988, shares the same melody to "A Game A Dream" but sung in Cantonese with different lyrics. It was an insert song on Looking Back in Anger and the music video features Yin Szema.

He found success in Hong Kong during the late 1980s and early 1990s. Many of his songs were used as the theme songs of popular TVB series. He is one of the few artists from Taiwan to break into the Hong Kong market, with four years of chart-topping record sales. He is likewise successful in other markets such as Malaysia, Singapore and mainland China. For example, he performed "In the Rain" (人在风雨中) for The Dictator, a Malaysian TV series.

Wang migrated to Canada in 1994, after his second marriage on 1 April 1993. He carried on releasing 2-Chinese albums a year until 1998. On 1 June 1996, It was moved to officially released a new Chinese album under a different label names Pony Canyon Taiwan, which ceased operations in Taiwan in late 1997 due to the Asian financial crisis. Altogether, he had released a total of five Mandarin albums in just a period of two years at Pony Canyon with notable hits like "I Love You (我愛你)".

On 20 December 1999, Wang made a comeback in the Hong Kong music industry and signed a recording contract with Emperor Entertainment Group (EEG). In January 2000, the album Giving was released with a few new songs as well as remixes of his older classics. Following the success of this album, Wang held a major charity concert in late February of the same year at Hong Kong Coliseum in Hong Kong.

Two years later, he released his latest Cantonese album (though called L'Amour et le Rêve 愛與夢). Around the same time, he participated in various movies including Jackie Chan's New Police Story.

He performed his first Beijing concert on 26 November 2004 and another in Xi'an on 16 September 2006. In January 2007, he released his latest Mandarin album Goodbye Madman (別了瘋子); like his previous Mandarin album Regaining Consciousness (甦醒), it was not heavily promoted.

After his 10-year contract with EEG expired, Wang held his 'I am Back' Concert on 23 October 2009 at the Hong Kong Coliseum.

He held a series of world tour concerts from August to November 2010 in Beijing, Singapore and Tianjin. He stated during a television interview in July 2010 that he would retire from the music industry after the tour. He then clarified in September that it was only song-writing that he would be leaving, after the completion of the album he was working on, and that he will still continue to perform in concerts.

On June 10, 2017, he announced he will eventually retire, saying his voice is no longer as good as it should be, as it was damaged due to an unknown offender that drugged him, affecting his voice many years ago.

In 2018, Wang released a digital album, I know I'm no longer a popular singer (我知道我是一個已經過氣的歌手), and retired in Canada.

== Musical style and output ==
His music and lyrics can be described as being melancholy and haunting in a blend of rock, ballads and blues, which is attributed to his impoverished and tough upbringing. Wang is also an established songwriter, having written many of his most popular songs but also covers songs by other artists, both from Asia and other continents.

To date, he has recorded 26 studio albums in Mandarin and 11 in Cantonese. In addition, numerous compilations of his popular songs have been released.

== Discography ==
=== Mandarin albums ===
UFO Records (Warner Music)

- A Game A Dream (一場遊戲一場夢) (December 1987)
- Forget You Forget Me (忘了你忘了我) (July 1988)
- Do I Really Have Nothing (是否我真的一無所有) (January 1989)
- Lone Star (孤星) (June 1989)
- Roared to the Sun (向太陽怒吼) (January 1990)
- I Want to Fly (我要飛) (May 1990)
- To Dream of a Lifetime Love (為了愛夢一生) (January 1991)
- Forget You Better Forget Myself (忘記妳不如忘記自己) (April 1991)
- All By Himself (January 1992)
- Hero Tears (英雄淚) (May 1992)
- Me (我) (January 1993)
- Road (路) (June 1993)
- Just Say You Love Me (只要說妳愛我) (January 1994)
- Migratory Birds (候鳥) (June 1994)
- Dream. In the Absence of the Night Dream (夢在無夢的夜裏) (February 1995)
- Would Rather not Free (情願不自由) (October 1995)

Pony Canyon (Forward Music)

- Brotherly love (手足情深) (August 1996)
- Forget All (忘了所有) (December 1996)
- I Love You (我愛你) (February 1997)
- Starting Point (起點) (August 1997)
- Substitute (替身) (August 1998)

Emperor Entertainment Group

- From Now On (從今開始) (August 2000)
- 愛我的 我愛的王傑 (February 2003)
- Not Alone (不孤單) (February 2004)
- Regaining Consciousness (甦醒) (September 2005)
- Goodbye Madman (別了瘋子) (January 2007)

Personal Development

- I Know I'm a Legendary Singer (我知道我是一個已經過氣的歌手) (December 2018)

=== Cantonese albums ===
Warner Music Hong Kong

- The Role of the Story (故事的角色) (February 1989)
- Who Can Understand a Loner's Heart? (誰明浪子心) (August 1989)
- Man in the Storm (人在風雨中) (December 1989)
- Stray Hearts (流浪的心) (December 1990)
- Heartbroken Forever (一生心碎) (November 1991)
- Blocked in my Life (封鎖我一生) (June 1992)
- She (她) (May 1993)
- Silent Masterpiece (啞巴的傑作) (April 1996)

Emperor Entertainment Group

- Giving (January 2000)
- Hello! (December 2000)
- L'Amour et le Rêve (愛與夢, lit. "Love and Dream") (July 2002)

=== Compilation albums ===
- Featured this life with no regrets (《今生無悔精選》 王傑新歌+精選) (April 1991)
- Golden Wang Television (王傑影視金曲) (October 1992)
- Loner's Heart (浪子心) (1993)
- Star Dream (《孤星夢》 王傑精選II) (1994)
- Wang Jie Rumours – Western Masterpiece (王傑外傳-西洋代表作) (May 1995)
- Masterpiece – Classic BBC Month (一番傑作——經典好歌全記錄) (May 1995)
- Classic Wang (王傑經典) (May 1995)
- Best of Wang (華納超極品音色系列 王傑) (May 1995)
- Wang – Best of the 80s Collection (八面威風精選系列—王傑) (May 1995)
- I Love Wang Classics (華納我愛經典系列 王傑) (May 1995)
- Tiehan Tenderness Wang Super Selection (王傑超級精選《鐵漢柔情》 (1999)
- Masterpiece (傑作) (1999)
- Outstanding Features – 16 (替身+傑出精選16) (2000)
- 21st Century Best Selection (最好2000世紀精選) (2000)
- Our Wang (我們的王傑17) (2000)
- Wang & Yung Pure Music (王傑+容祖兒 純音樂世界) (2001)
- Wang Long Live 2001 (《王傑萬歲 2001》 新曲+精選) (new song) (2001)
- Extreme Classics (華納至尊經典系列-王傑) (2002)
- Featured Wang SACD Edition (王傑精選 SACD 版) (2002)
- Wang Jie 23 Anniversary Collection (華納23周年紀念精選系列-王傑) (2002)
- Lone Star (孤星．英雄淚 王傑時代金選) (2003)
- The Most Beautiful... Wang (最動聽的...王傑) (2004)
- Outstanding Selection 2004 (王傑2004 傑出之選) (2004)
- Wang Chieh XRCD Special (王傑 XRCD SPECIAL) (2005)
- Wang Number 1s Double CD (王傑 華納No.1系列 2CD) (2006)
- Most Remarkable Wang (王傑 華納最出色系列 3CD+DVD) (2007)
- Wang Jie (王傑[LPCD45]) (2007)

=== Remastered albums ===
- A Game, a Dream (AMCD 王傑[一場遊戲一場夢]) (2011)
- The Role of the Story (華納暢銷經典 HDCD 王傑[故事的角色]) (1999)
- The Role of the Story (DSD CD 王傑[故事的角色]) (2002)
- The Role of the Story (LPCD 1630 王傑[故事的角色]) (2009)
- The Role of the Story (AMCD 王傑[故事的角色]) (2011)
- Return of the Prodigal (華納暢銷經典 HDCD 王傑[誰明浪子心]) (1999)
- Return of the Prodigal (DSD CD 王傑[誰明浪子心]) (2002)
- Return of the Prodigal (金唱片复刻王 王傑[誰明浪子心]) (2010)
- Featured this life with no regrets (華納暢銷經典 HDCD 王傑[今生無悔精選]) (1999)
- Featured this life with no regrets (DSD CD 王傑[今生無悔精選]) (2002)
- Featured this life with no regrets (SACD 王傑[今生無悔精選]) (2015)
- Featured this life with no regrets (金唱片復刻王 王傑[今生無悔精選]) (2010)
- Golden Wang Television (華納暢銷經典 HDCD 王傑[王傑影視金曲]) (1999)
- Giving (DSD CD 王傑[Giving]) (2003)
- Giving (LPCD45II 王傑[Giving]) (2014)
- Our Wang (LPCD 45 我們的王傑17) (2008)
- Love Me, I Love, Wang Jie (《AQCD 愛我的我愛的王傑》 新歌加經典重唱 ) (2010)
- 5-CD box set I Love You (《DSD 我愛你》) (2013)

=== Concert albums ===
- Wang's 2001 (Wang's 2001红磡演唱会) (2001)
- 2014 Live In Beijing (王者歸來 世界巡回演唱會 北京站) (2014)

== Concerts ==
- 1989 21–23 July Live in Singapore
- 1990 22–27 February 'True Feelings' Hong Kong Concert
- 1990 29 June 'I Want to Fly' Fans' Concert (Kaohsiung)
- 1990 20 July 'Care Candidates' Fans' Concert (Taipei)
- 1991 August 'Forget Myself' Live Taiwan Tour (Kaohsiung, Tainan and Taipei)
- 1991 4 September 'CTS TV Live' Taiwan Concert
- 1992 January 'You Love Wang Jie Loves You' Taiwan Concert
- 2000 23 February 'Giving for the Children' Hong Kong Concert
- 2000 8–9 December Live China Tour (Guangzhou)
- 2000 28 December Live China Tour (Shaoguan)
- 2000 30 December Live China Tour (Shenzhen)
- 2001 4–6 April 'Wang's 2001' Hong Kong Concert
- 2001 26 April – 1 May Live US Tour
- 2002 27 April 'Live in Genting' Malaysia Concert
- 2003 21 March 'Love Me & I Love Charity Concert' (Taipei)
- 2003 12 & 14 September 'A Night of Love Songs' US Concert (Sheraton Convention Centre)
- 2003 5 October Live in US (Atlantic City)
- 2004 24 October Live in US (Atlantic City)
- 2004 24 November 'Purple Sky' Beijing Concert
- 2006 16 September 'Going Home' Xi'an Concert
- 2007 Dave Wang Live US Tour (US Caesars Casino Hotel)
- 2009 20–21 September Live in US (Niagara Fallsview Casino Resort)
- 2009 23 October I Am Back！Dave Wang Concert 2009 (Hong Kong)
- 2010 20–21 February Lunar New Year Live in US (Foxwoods Resort Casino)
- 2010 7 August Dave Wang World Tour - Beijing
- 2010 23 October Dave Wang World Tour - Singapore (Singapore EXPO – The MAX Pavilion)
- 2010 6 November Dave Wang World Tour - Tianjin
- 2011 23 May Dave Wang World Tour - London (HMV Hammersmith Apollo, London)
- 2012 8 September Dave Wang World Tour - Guangzhou
- 2012 22 September Dave Wang World Tour - Shenzhen
- 2012 31 December Dave Wang World Tour - Shanghai
- 2013 17 May Dave Wang World Tour - Hangzhou
- 2013 28 September Dave Wang World Tour - Taiyuan
- 2014 17 May Dave Wang World Tour - Beijing
- 2014 26 July Dave Wang World Tour - Nanyang
- 2014 30 August Dave Wang World Tour - Dongguan
- 2015 24 January Dave Wang World Tour - Shenzhen
- 2015 8 August Dave Wang World Tour - Beijing
- 2015 26 September Dave Wang World Tour - Macau
- 2015 17 October Dave Wang World Tour - Nanning

== Filmography ==
=== Film ===
- 1977 Executioners from Shaolin
- 1978 Soul of the Sword
- 1989 Seven Wolves
- 1989 Seven Wolves 2
- 1991 Casino Raiders 2
- 1992 Invincible
- 2000 The Legend of the Flying Swordsman
- 2000 A War Named Desire
- 2000 Roaring Wheels
- 2001 Esprit d'Amour
- 2002 Return From The Other World
- 2002 Love is a Butterfly
- 2002 Summer Breeze of Love
- 2004 Heat Team
- 2004 New Police Story

=== Television series ===
- 1989: Yang Zi Bu Jiao Shui Zhi Guo (養子不教誰之過, 40 Episodes) - Taiwan CTS series, aired in April
- 1992: Once Upon a Time in Hong Kong (血濺塘西, 20 Episodes) - Hong Kong TVB series, aired from 5–30 October
- 2005: Just Love (老婆大人, 20 Episodes) - Hong Kong TVB series, aired from 9 May - June 3
- 2011: Shanghai Legend (上海灘之俠醫傳奇, 22 Episodes) - Hong Kong ATV series, aired in October (produced in 2004)

== Awards and nominations ==
=== Awards ===
- 1988 Golden Horse Film Awards – Best Original Film Score
- 1989 Hong Kong International Phonograph Record Association Awards – Platinum Phonograph Record
- 1989 CRHK Ultimate Song Chart Award – Best Newcomer Gold Award
- 1990 RTHK Top 10 Gold Songs Awards – Most Promising Newcomer Gold Award
- 1990 Jade Solid Gold Best Ten Music Awards Presentation – Most Popular Newcomer
- 1992 Taiwan Top Ten Idols
- 1992 Taiwan Best Dream Sweetheart (No 1)
- 2000 Guangzhou Music Awards – Asian & Pacific area Best Male Singer
- 2000 Metro Hits Music Awards – Song Award
- 2000 Original Choice of Chinese Pop Music – Song Award 1999
- 2000 Golden TVB8 Top Golden Melody Awards −1999
- 2002 Golden TVB8 Melody Awards – Best Recommendation Song
- 2003 Golden TVB8 Melody Awards – Best Recommendation Song
- 2003 Guangzhou Television "Hit King Election Season Awards" – Best Mandarin Song
- 2004 Jiangsu Music Prize Presentation Ceremony – Best Composer
- 2004 Metro Hits Chinese Music Awards – Chinese Song Award

=== Nominations ===
- 1990 1st Taiwan Golden Melody Awards – Most Popular Male Singer
- 1992 3rd Taiwan Golden Melody Awards – Best Album
- 1993 4th Taiwan Golden Melody Awards – Most Popular Male Singer
- 1993 1st Singapore Hit Awards – Most Popular Male Singer
- 1994 5th Taiwan Golden Melody Awards – Best Song: Going Home《回家》
- 1994 2nd Singapore Hit Awards – Most Popular Male Singer
- 1994 2nd Singapore Hit Awards – Best Song: Road《路》
