= Football Mania (TV series) =

- 足球火
- Starring: Sun Jihai
- Country of origin: China
- Original language: Chinese
- No. of seasons: 1

Production
- Production locations: China, Manchester
- Production companies: Camsing Global; Bingxun Sports; Guangdong TV

Original release
- Network: Guangdong TV
- Release: April 28, 2017 – July 2017

Football Mania (Chinese: 足球火) is a Chinese reality TV show where a number of budding amateur footballers from across China compete for places in a newly created team. Along the way, the team will play matches against a range of opponents from across China. Their journey will also be book-ended by matches against Manchester City's under-18s team, first playing them at City Football Academy in Manchester in March before hosting them for the return leg in July.

The show will also feature Chinese football icon and former Manchester City player Sun Jihai in a recurring role. Additionally, Manchester City will provide the team's head coach as well as their tactical direction.

The show is broadcast on 30 platforms, both televisual and digital, notably on Guangdong TV as well as online via Tencent Sports.
