= Jiayu =

Jiayu may refer to:

- Jiayu Pass, the first pass at the west end of the Great Wall of China
- Jiayu County, in Xianning, Hubei, China
- Kongzi Jiayu, or The School Sayings of Confucius
- Jia Yu Channel, a Malaysian Chinese-language pay-TV channel
- Jiayu Town (贾峪镇) in the Prefecture-level city of Xingyang in Henan province, China
