= The Dictator (TV series) =

- 我主皇朝
- Genre: Drama
- Directed by: Ng Jat Faan (吴一帆)
- Starring: Chak Lam Yeung (杨泽霖); Teddy Lin (连伟健); Cheryl Lim (林秋燕); June Ng (吴紫妍); Ziu Wing Coi (赵永财); Gou Leon (高 麟)
- Theme music composer: Chi Yuen Chan
- Opening theme: "In the Rain" (人在风雨中) performed by Dave Wang
- Country of origin: Malaysia
- Original languages: Cantonese; Malay
- No. of episodes: 30

Production
- Production locations: Kuala Lumpur, Malaysia
- Camera setup: Single-camera
- Running time: 60 minutes (commercial breaks)
- Production company: HVD Entertainment

Original release
- Network: TV2 (1995); Jia Yu Channel (2008); Kah Lai Toi (2016)
- Release: April 2 – June 6, 1995

The Dictator
- Chinese: 我主皇朝
- Literal meaning: "my lord dynasty"
Transcriptions
Standard Mandarin
- Hanyu Pinyin: wǒ zhǔ huángcháo
Yue: Cantonese
- Jyutping: ngo5 zyu2 wong4 ciu4

The Dictator is a Malaysian Cantonese television drama that began airing on RTM TV2 in Malaysia on 4 April 1995, and ended on 6 June 1995, with a total of 30 episodes.

== Cast ==
- Chak Lam Yeung as Gaan Dung Loi
- Teddy Lin as Gaan Kar Bou/Gwok Jing Hou
- Cheryl Lim as Gaan Bik Jyu
- June Ng as Gaan Hang Lin
- Ziu Wing Coi as Zau Gin Keong
- Gou Leon as Lee Wing Jyun
- Hon Jing as Gaan Dung Loi's mother
- Cheng Kam Cheong as Gwok Mong Kai
- Chen Gwai Lin as Gaan Kar Wai
- Wong Zeon Ming as Lau Zi Hung
