= Television Southern =

Chinese television network

Television Southern (TVS) 广东南方电视台 (南方台)
- Type: Satellite television
- Industry: Television Broadcasting
- Founded: 1 July 2001; 24 years ago
- Defunct: 23 April 2014; 12 years ago
- Fate: Merged into Guangdong Radio and Television
- Headquarters: Guangzhou, China
- Area served: China and abroad via Internet
- Parent: Guangdong Radio and Television

TVS Television (called TVS), originally known as Southern Television Guangdong is a regional Chinese language sub-network under Guangdong Radio and Television in Southern China. TVS is based in Guangzhou and covers mainly in Guangdong and Hong Kong. Most of the channels programming and broadcast is mainly in Cantonese, with additional Mandarin Chinese broadcasts.

Founded in 2001, it is the sister station of Guangdong TV under the Southern Media Corporation.

Although technically a state owned station, TVS is modelled after TVB of Hong Kong and TDM of Macau, and is targeted at the Pearl Delta Region by the Chinese government.

News reports are in both Cantonese and Mandarin.

TVS has several channels (TVS1, TVS2, TVS3, TVS4, TVS5) and the TVS 2 covers most of the population in China and is the first Cantonese satellite TV channel with world-wide coverage, including Australia, Canada and USA.

== See also ==
- Guangzhou Television
- Guangdong TV
- Kah Lai Toi
