= Dongguan Radio and Television Station =

Chinese regional government broadcaster

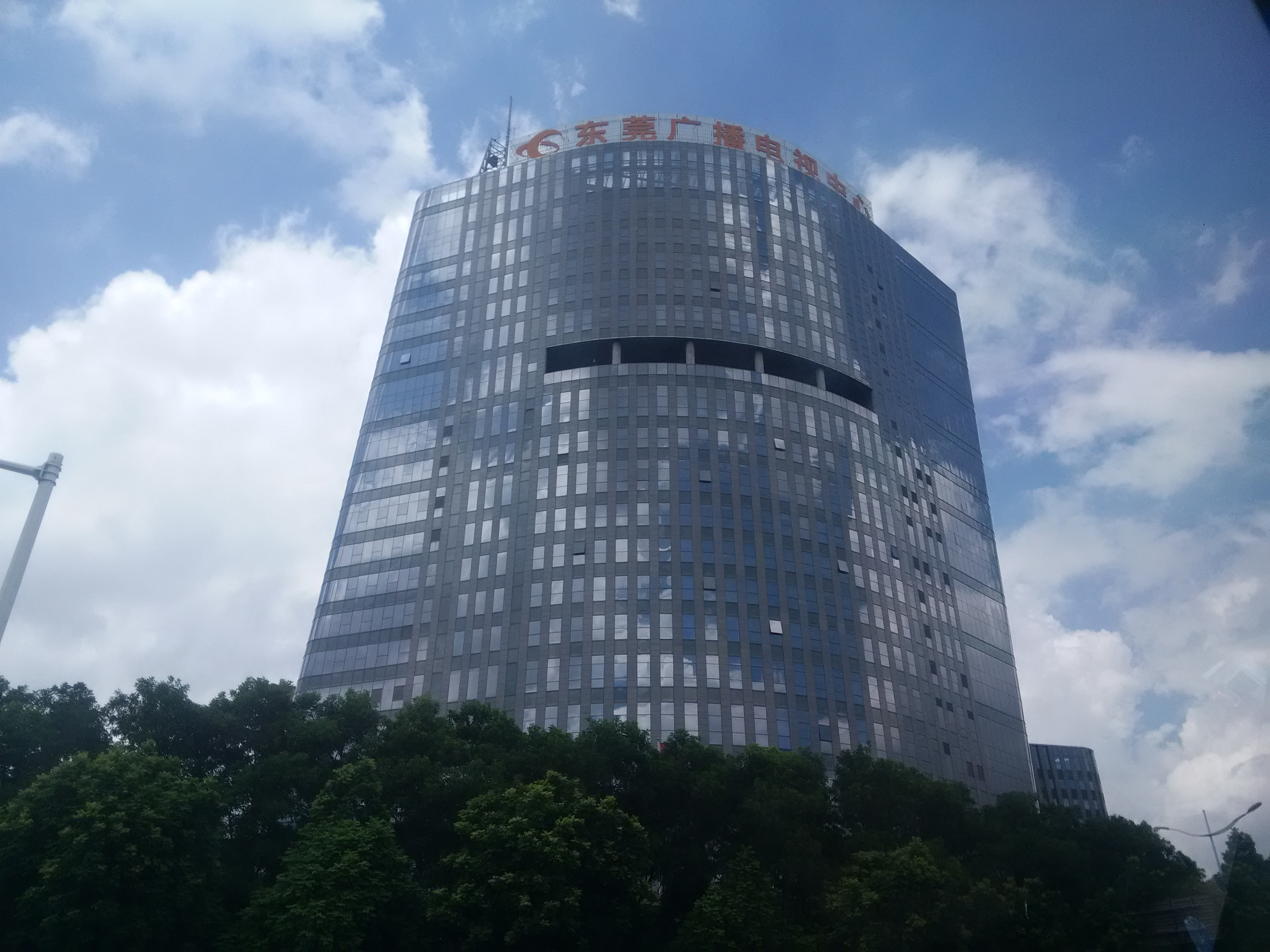
- Dongguan Radio and Television Center
- Type: Public
- Country: China
- First air date: 1 January 1985 (radio); 1 October 1984 (television)
- Headquarters: Jiangmen
- Owner: Propaganda Committee of the Dongguan Municipal Committee of the CCP
- Parent: Southern Media Corporation
- Established: 28 March 2005 (current corporation)
- Official website: www.sun0769.com

The Dongguan Radio and Television Station (东莞广播电视台) and its subsidiary, Dongguan Media Group (東莞廣播電視傳媒集團), is a public institution subordinate to the local CCP committee, as a local media company with connections to the municipality. The radio station was founded on 1 January 1985 and the radio station on 1 October 1984. The two separate companies were merged to form the current one on 28 March 2005.

== History ==
The predecessor organizations were the Dongguan Television Station and the Dongguan People's Broadcasting Station, both subordinate to the Dongguan Municipal Radio and Television Corporation. On 1 October 1984, Dongguan Television started broadcasting, while the radio station followed on 1 January 1985. At the time, the radio facilities were located at Xizheng Street on 106,9 MHz. On 18 March 1990, the station started FM stereo broadcasts. A second radio station opened in 1998, airing music.

On 1 July 2001, Dongguan Television merged with Dongguan Cable Television, but kept the name of the terrestrial station. On 18 March 2004, it launched its media brand, Sunshine Network, after the merger of the radio and television companies, the Dongguan Sunshine Network portal opened on 28 December 2005, becoming one of the Four Main Media Outlets of Dongguan. On 23 March 2004, Dongguan Television merged with the People's Broadcasting Station to create a unit subordinate to the Southern Media Group. That year, the municipal government restructured its managing institutions, with all media activities transferred from the Municipal Radio and Television Corporation to the Municipal Culture, Radio, Television, Press and Publishing Corporation. In 2006, the ratings of its two television channels surpassed those of Hong Kong-based TVB, which was available on local cable, thus becoming the most watched television channel in Dongguan. In May 2008, both FM stations (music and general service) started broadcasting a 24-horu service. A third radio station, a music service, launched in July 2013, with the original music station becoming a traffic station. On 28 September 2011, the company moved to the Dongguan Radio and Television Center.

On 28 May 2014, prefecture-level cities in the Pearl River Delta such as Foshan, Zhaoqing, Huizhou, Qingyuan, Zhuhai, Jiangmen and Zhongshan implemented a plan to launch their respective television stations on cable in the region, enabling the Dongguan General Channel to be seen in neighboring areas. On 28 March 2015, the Dongguan Radio and Television Station Media Group was established, with it and the Dongguan Radio and Television Station operating under a single organization with two names. In July 2016, the Dongguan Radio and Television Station Media Group combined radio, television and internet resources to create its own multimedia center. In December 2018, its two television channels started broadcasting high definition simulcasts. In 2022, the Dongguan Public Channel became the Lifestyle Channel.

On 17 February 2025, some programs from the Dongguan Music Station were transferred to the General Station and the Traffic Station, while the last one has implemented some programs generated with artificial intelligence.

== Assets ==
Dongguan Radio and Television Station owns three radio stations and two television channels. It also has the official website, the Dongguan Sunshine Network, social media profiles on WeChat, Sina Weibo and Douyin, as well as the Know Dongguan app. The company controls eleven subsidiaries.

=== Television ===
Channel name	Language	Format	Launch date	Former names	Content
Dongguan General Channel	Mandarin; Cantonese	SD: PAL 576i 16:9; HD：1080i	1 October 1984	Dongguan Television Station; Dongguan TV News Channel	Mainly broadcasts news, current affairs and special programs.
Dongguan Information and Lifestyle Channel	Mandarin; Cantonese	SD: PAL 576i 16:9; HD：1080i	1 January 2022	Dongguan Cable TV; Dongguan Cable TV Entertainment Channel; Dongguan TV Business and Life Channel; Dongguan Radio and Television Public Channel	Originally, it aired content related to public policies, but since 2022, it airs programs related to lifestyle and leisure.

=== Radio ===
Station name	Language	Frequence	Launch date	Former names	Content
General Station (Sunshine 1008)	Mandarin	FM100.8	18 March 1990	Dongguan People's Broadcasting Station	General service with news, public interest, service and supervision.
Music and Traffic Station (Enjoy 1075)	Mandarin	FM107.5	1998	Dongguan People's Broadcasting Station Music Station	Aims at an actively-driving audience, with traffic updates, lifestyle information and service programming.

== Programming ==
As the media outlet of the local CCP committee, it is authorized to broadcast and distribute radio and television programs and serving as propaganda to the party and all levels of the Chinese government. As such, it is authorized to broadcast China National Radio's National News Network and China Central Television's News Network.

In addition to its news service, the radio station also produced programs such as Children's DoReMi, as well as service programs such as Sunshine Hotline and 1075 Express.

The television channels broadcast in both Mandarin and Cantonese. Dongguan News is the main news service, on air since its creation, known for reporting on local news. It also airs Morning News and Midday News. Focus and Today's Topics in Dongguan air in the local Cantonese dialect, and are also important in the news division. Cities and streets under the jurisdiction of Dongguan City produce their local news services in the Cantonese program City and Street Direct Line. It also produces educational programs on the history and culture of Dongguan, such as Dongguan Discoveries, Hometown Flavors, 400-Year Old Cattle Market, the Banana Boat documentary and TV series such as Hometown, The Story of a TV Station etc. The Story of a TV Station was the first drama series in mainland China to use television staff as actors.
