= Southern Media Corporation =

Television network

Southern Media Corporation 南方廣播影視傳媒集團 南方广播影视传媒集团
- Company type: public
- Industry: Broadcast radio and television
- Founded: 18 January 2004
- Headquarters: Guangzhou, Guangdong, China
- Area served: China and abroad
- Website: www.smc.gd.cn/

Southern Media Corporation
- Traditional Chinese: 南方廣播影視傳媒集團
- Simplified Chinese: 南方广播影视传媒集团
Transcriptions
Standard Mandarin
- Hanyu Pinyin: Nánfāng Guǎngbò Yǐngshì Chuánméi Jítuán
Yue: Cantonese
- Yale Romanization: Nàahmfōng Gwóngbo Yéngsi Chyùhnmùih Jaahptyùhn
- Jyutping: Naam4 Fong1 Gwong2 Bo3 Yeng2 Si6 Cyun4 Mui4 Zaap6 Tyun4

The Southern Media Corporation (SMC) is a television network based in Guangzhou, Guangdong. It was founded on 18 January 2004 between the merge of Guangdong Television (GDTV) and Southern Television (TVS). At the same time the television network expanded its service to Hong Kong, Macau and North America to compete with Television Broadcasts Limited (TVB) and Asia Television (aTV), other major Cantonese language TV networks.

== Sub-Network ==
- Guangdong Television
- Southern Television
- Radio Guangdong

== Predecessor ==
- Guangdong Radio and Television
