= Call Me by Fire season 2 =

Call Me by Fire
- Season 2
- Official poster of season 2
- Native name
- Traditional Chinese: 披荊斬棘
- Simplified Chinese: 披荆斩棘
- Literal meaning: Big Brothers That Cut Through Thorns
- Hanyu Pinyin: Pī jīng zhǎn jí
- Presented by: Qi Sijun
- No. of contestants: 32

Release
- Original network: Mango TV
- Original release: August 19, 2022 – 4 November 2022

Season chronology
- ← Previous; Season 1

Call Me by Fire (Season 2) (Chinese: 披荊斬棘; pinyin: Pī jīng zhǎn jí) is a 2022 Chinese singing reality television show which premiered on August 19, 2022, on Mango TV. The second season of Call Me by Fire, it features 32 seasoned male celebrities from mainland China, Taiwan, Hong Kong, Singapore, Thailand and the US who compete to form a boy band. The Chinese title of the show has also been renamed from 披荆斩棘的哥哥 to 披荊斬棘.

== Contestants ==
Each contestant's English name will be used if known. Otherwise, the hanyu pinyin version of the name would be used in the order of surname followed by given name. All Chinese names are in simplified Chinese.

| Name | | Profession | Birth Place | Birthdate (Age) |
|---|---|---|---|---|
| Jordan Chan | 陈小春 | Actor, singer | Guangdong | July 8, 1967 (age 59) |
| Raymond Lam | 林峯 | Actor, singer | Xiamen | December 8, 1979 (age 46) |
| Ron Ng | 吴卓羲 | Actor, singer | Hong Kong | September 2, 1979 (age 47) |
| Deric Wan | 温兆伦 | Actor, singer, songwriter | Hong Kong | November 18, 1964 (age 61) |
| Vanness Wu | 吴建豪 | Singer, actor | United States | August 7, 1978 (age 48) |
| Mike D. Angelo | 迈克·D·安吉洛 | Actor, singer | Thailand | December 19, 1989 (age 36) |
| Fan Shiqi | 范世锜 | Singer | Jilin | March 23, 1992 (age 34) |
| Zhu Jiaqi | 朱嘉琦 | Actor | Hebei | October 21, 1992 (age 34) |
| Shin | 信 | Singer, actor | Taiwan | May 14, 1971 (age 55) |
| Hao Yun | 郝云 | Singer, songwriter | Henan | February 25, 1979 (age 47) |
| Julian Cheung | 张智霖 | Actor, singer | Hong Kong | August 27, 1971 (age 55) |
| Ma Di | 马𬱖 | Singer, songwriter | Beijing | January 15, 1989 (age 37) |
| Zheng Jun | 郑钧 | Singer-songwriter | Xi'an | November 6, 1967 (age 59) |
| Yida Huang | 黄义达 | Singer, songwriter | Singapore | August 11, 1979 (age 47) |
| Ren Ke (lead singer of folk band Wu Tiao Ren (五条人)) | 仁科 | Singer, accordionist, guitarist | Guangdong | June 17, 1986 (age 40) |
| Pakho Chau | 周柏豪 | Singer, actor | Hong Kong | November 12, 1984 (age 41) |
| Richie Jen | 任贤齐 | Singer, actor | Taiwan | June 23, 1966 (age 60) |
| Will Pan | 潘玮柏 | Singer, actor | United States | August 6, 1980 (age 46) |
| Kenji Wu | 吴克群 | Singer, songwriter, actor | Taiwan | October 18, 1979 (age 47) |
| Ice Yang | 杨长青 | Rapper, singer | Sichuan | May 14, 1996 (age 30) |
| Chang Chen-yue | 张震岳 | Singer, songwriter | Taiwan | May 2, 1974 (age 52) |
| Hawick Lau | 刘恺威 | Actor, singer | Hong Kong | October 13, 1974 (age 52) |
| Darren Wang | 王大陆 | Actor | Taiwan | May 29, 1991 (age 35) |
| Julian Cai | 蔡珩 | Actor | Shanghai | November 17, 1986 (age 39) |
| Nathan Scott Lee | 李承铉 | Singer, actor | United States | October 30, 1984 (age 42) |
| Alen Fang | 方逸伦 | Singer, actor | Zhejiang | December 26, 1992 (age 33) |
| Johnny Zhang | 张峻宁 | Actor, singer | Jiangsu | March 22, 1985 (age 41) |
| Alex To | 杜德伟 | Singer, actor | Hong Kong | February 10, 1962 (age 64) |
| Jin Han | 金瀚 | Actor, singer | Qinghai | June 7, 1993 (age 33) |
| Mike Tsang | 曾比特 | Singer | Shanwei | November 7, 1993 (age 33) |
| Leon Zhang | 张云龙 | Actor | Dalian | March 2, 1988 (age 38) |
| Alec Su | 苏有朋 | Actor, singer | Taiwan | September 11, 1973 (age 53) |
