= Roaring Wheels =

2000 Hong Kong film by Aman Chang

- Directed by: Aman Chang
- Starring: Karen Mok; Dave Wong; Moses Chan; Maggie Siu; An-ting Yeh
- Release date: 19 October 2000; (Hong Kong)
- Running time: 93 minutes
- Country: Hong Kong
- Language: Cantonese

Roaring Wheels is a 2000 Hong Kong action movie directed by Aman Chang. The film stars Karen Mok, Dave Wong, Moses Chan and Maggie Siu in the lead roles.

== Cast ==
- Karen Mok
- Dave Wong
- Moses Chan
- Maggie Siu
- An-ting Yeh
