= Happily Ever After? (2024 TV series) =

2024 Hong Kong television series

- Also known as: 婚後事
- Genre: Romance; Drama; Family
- Written by: Wong Bing-yee
- Directed by: Lincoln Lam; Tsang Man-shan; Cheung Kai-lung; Yuen Sui-fung
- Starring: Him Law; Yoyo Chen; Lai Lok-yi; Winki Lai; Venus Wong; Joey Law
- Opening theme: "傾城 (The Fallen City)" by Mike Tsang
- Country of origin: Hong Kong
- Original language: Cantonese
- No. of episodes: 20

Production
- Producer: Lincoln Lam
- Production location: Hong Kong
- Running time: 43 minutes
- Production company: 77 Atelier

Original release
- Network: TVB Jade; myTV Super
- Release: 26 February – 22 March 2024

Happily Ever After? (Chinese: 婚後事; lit. 'Life After Marriage') is a Hong Kong romantic drama series produced by 77 Atelier, with Lincoln Lam serving as producer. The 20-episode series aired on TVB Jade from 26 February to 22 March 2024. It follows six characters as they navigate love, marriage, and desire, exploring themes of infidelity, family conflicts, and personal dilemmas. Starring Him Law, Yoyo Chen, Lai Lok-yi, Winki Lai, Venus Wong, and Joey Law, the series received critical acclaim and strong online viewership for its realistic portrayal of contemporary relationships, despite not winning any major awards.

== Cast ==
=== Main characters ===
- Him Law as Tim Poon Sin-yan, a principled, reclusive lecturer with a literary background, whose limited social skills keep his career stagnant.
- Yoyo Chen as Emma Cheung Ming-sum, a working mother and primary breadwinner whose efforts create distance and tension with Tim.
- Lai Lok-yi as Davey Kam Shing-kwan, a charismatic and pragmatic tutoring entrepreneur from humble beginnings. A former university friend of Tim and Emma, he has a longtime crush on Emma.
- Winki Lai as Gina Lui Ching-lam, ambitious and resourceful, Gina is the only woman Davey openly acknowledges. She is the elder sister of Mira.
- Venus Wong as Mira Lui Ching-hoi, a free-spirited freelance scriptwriter who pursues "true love" and becomes involved with Tim Poon. She is the younger sister of Gina.
- Joey Law as Ching Tin-fai, a carefree and idealistic character who dreams of filmmaking. He is a dependable friend of Mira.
- Four actors as Poon Yuet, Tim and Emma's daughter, who initially admires her father
  - Ng Hei-yi (age 4)
  - Wong Hau-yi (age 7)
  - Phoebe Cheng Chi-yuet (age 9)
  - Stephanie Au (adolescent)

=== Supporting characters ===
- Lo Koon-lan, Gina and Mira's grandmother
- Eva Lai as Nancy Gu Lan, Emma's mother and Poon Yuet's maternal grandmother
- Willie Lau as Poon Leung, Tim's father and Poon Yuet's paternal grandfather
- Yeung Tsz-fung as Tin-tin, Mira and Tin-fai's son
- Toby Chan as Dr. Ho Yeuk-suet, a psychologist and Tim's first love
- Eric Tang as Gordon Ma, Tim's lawyer in the divorce case
- Blossom Chan as Helen Kong, Emma's lawyer in the divorce case

== Themes and production ==
Happily Ever After? explores marriage, infidelity, and the emotional dynamics of contemporary relationships. The series uses a multi-perspective, Rashomon-style narrative, revisiting key events from different characters' viewpoints to highlight subjective biases, interpersonal conflict, and emotional nuance. Combining realistic and dramatized elements, it examines how personal values, family background, and life experience shape romantic decisions. The series adopts a mature tone, incorporating intimacy and adult relationship dilemmas to reflect both emotional and physical aspects of middle-aged love. Themes include personal development, family influence, and social pressures, with characters portrayed as morally complex rather than strictly heroic or antagonistic.

== Plot ==
The series follows the intertwined lives of six main characters. Tim Poon (Him Law), an itinerant lecturer, is married to Emma Cheung (Yoyo Chen), who runs a domestic helper agency and serves as the family's breadwinner. They met in university along with their friend Davey Kam (Lai Lok-yi), who has long harbored feelings for Emma. When Tim's father is diagnosed with cancer and reveals significant debts, Emma helps repay them, creating financial and emotional strain. During this period, Tim forms a close attachment to Mira Lui (Venus Wong), a free-spirited scriptwriter. Though initially platonic, Tim develops romantic feelings and writes a private novel inspired by Mira. When Emma discovers it, they divorce.

Davey runs a tutorial center while in a relationship with Gina Lui (Winki Lai). Despite their outward stability, his emotional distance and attachment to Emma lead Gina to end the relationship.

After the divorce, Tim dates Mira, who helps them confront their emotional voids. They realize their bond stems from unresolved desires rather than compatibility and end the relationship. Meanwhile, Mira's friend Ching Tin-fai (Joey Law) develops feelings for her. Emma briefly dates Davey before reconciling with Tim. Tim later faces a cancer diagnosis and eventually accepts treatment with support from Emma and their daughter, Poon Yuet.

Mira marries Tin-fai and they have a son, Tin-tin. Their marriage deteriorates due to neglect and incompatible aspirations, ending amicably. Davey and Gina reunite and marry, but after the death of their infant, Gina leaves him. They reconcile following Davey's coma, and Gina also mends her relationship with Mira, resolving their past conflicts.

== Music ==
Track Listing
No.	Title	Lyrics	Music	Artist(s)	Length
1.	"The Fallen City (傾城)"	Wyman Wong	Tan Kah Beng	Mike Tsang	3:28
2.	"Gulf of Alaska* (阿拉斯加海灣)"	Lee Kang Ning	Firdhaus	Vivian Koo	4:05
3.	"Monday" (Featured in ep. 3)	Abigail Sinclair; Callum Mountford	Abigail Sinclair; Callum Mountford	Even	4:17
4.	"No Man's Land* (無人之境)" (Featured in ep. 6)	Wyman Wong	Eric Kwok	Eason Chan	3:41
5.	"Soulmate (知己)" (Featured in ep. 8)	Alan Cheung	Alan Cheung	Alfred Hui; Jinny Ng	3:41
6.	"Final Goodbye" (Featured in ep. 9)	Abigail Sinclair; Callum Mountford; Matthew Bishop	Abigail Sinclair; Callum Mountford; Matthew Bishop	Even	4:28
7.	"Crying* (哭牆)" (Featured in ep. 16)	Dominic Chu	Dominic Chu	Vivian Koo	4:38

(*) A direct translation of the original title is provided when no official English song title exists.

== Ratings and reception ==
The series received positive responses from audiences in Hong Kong and mainland China, earning a peak of 8.8 rating on Douban. A writer for HK01 noted that the script resonates strongly with viewers and praised the drama's multi-perspective structure and character-driven depth. The main cast members were recognized for their performances, and child actress Phoebe Cheng drew praise for her portrayal of a daughter coping with her parents' divorce. Despite modest traditional ratings, the series generated strong online engagement, including 516,000 social media interactions for its first nine episodes and over 950,000 myTV Super views after the finale—nearly double that of the second-place show—underscoring its impact. It also ranked fourth on Google Hong Kong's 2024 "Top Ten Most Searched TV Dramas" list.

Week	Episodes	Airing dates	Ratings (Note: According to Hong Kong's TV rating system, each rating point represents approximately 64,670 viewers.)		Ref.
Week	Episodes	Airing dates	Cross-platform peak ratings	Viewership	Ref.
1	1 – 5	26 February–1 March 2024	17.3 points	1.13 million	
2	6 – 10	4–8 March 2024	18.7 points	1.21 million	
3	11 – 15	11–15 March 2024	18 points	1.17 million	
4	16 – 20	18–22 March 2024	19.1 points	1.24 million	

== Awards and nominations ==
Despite critical acclaim and strong audience engagement, Happily Ever After? failed to win any major awards at the 57th TVB Anniversary Awards, sparking controversy and disappointment among some viewers.

Year	Award	Category	Nominated work	Results	Ref.
2024	57th TVB Anniversary Awards	Best Television Series	Happily Ever After?	Nominated	
2024	57th TVB Anniversary Awards	Best Actor	Him Law	Nominated	
2024	57th TVB Anniversary Awards	Best Television Theme song	"The Fallen City"	Nominated	
2024	57th TVB Anniversary Awards	My Favorite Television Series (Greater Bay Area)	Happily Ever After?	Nominated	
2024	57th TVB Anniversary Awards	My Favorite Actor In A Leading Role (Greater Bay Area)	Him Law	Nominated	
2024	57th TVB Anniversary Awards	My Favorite Actress In A Leading Role (Greater Bay Area)	Yoyo Chen	Nominated	
2024	9th Audience's Favorite TV Awards	Best Screenplay	Happily Ever After?	Nominated	
2024	9th Audience's Favorite TV Awards	Best Actor	Him Law	Nominated	

== Related show ==
Hong Kong Happy Ever After Special (Chinese: 香港婚後事) is a 10-episode spinoff of Happily Ever After?, hosted by Lai Lok-yi, Yoyo Chen, Winki Lai, and Joey Law. Combining talk-show discussions with reality-style glamping experiences, the series explores topics related to love and marriage, from premarital relationships and post-marriage conflicts to infidelity and divorce. It aired from 25 April to 24 May 2024.
