= Guangdong Radio and Television =

Chinese radio and television network

Guangdong Radio and Television 广东广播电视台
- Type: Free-to-air, satellite television, radio
- Industry: Media and entertainment
- Founded: 23 April 2014; 12 years ago
- Headquarters: Guangzhou, Guangdong, China
- Area served: Guangdong, China
- Owner: Guangdong Provincial People's Government
- Website: www.gdtv.cn

Guangdong Radio and Television
- Traditional Chinese: 廣東廣播電視臺
- Simplified Chinese: 广东广播电视台
Transcriptions
Standard Mandarin
- Hanyu Pinyin: Guǎngdōng Guǎngbò Diànshì Tái
- Wade–Giles: Kuang-tung Kuang-po Tien-shih-tʻai
Yue: Cantonese
- Yale Romanization: Gwóngdūng Gwóngbo Dihnsih Tòih
- Jyutping: Gwong2 Dung1 Gwong2 Bo3 Din6 Si6 Toi4

Guangdong Radio and Television, commonly known as GRT, is a broadcasting company based in Guangdong, China. The company is operating 9 radio channels, 12 free-to-air and 10 pay television channels. The company is owned by the Guangdong provincial government. The company is based in Guangzhou, Guangdong. The GRT compete ratings with local municipal broadcasters (e.g. Guangzhou Broadcasting Network) and Hong Kong's TVB network in the province.

== History ==
GRT was formed on 23 April 2014 after the merge of Guangdong Television (GDTV), Radio Guangdong, Southern Media Corporation, and Television Southern (TVS).

== Television ==
Name		Content	Language	Transmission	Format	Launch date	Websites / Notes
Free-to-air channels
GDTV-1	广东卫视	Main channel	Mandarin	Terrestrial, cable, IPTV and satellite	HDTV and SDTV	1 July 1960	Website
GDTV-2	珠江频道	Main channel	Cantonese	Terrestrial, cable and IPTV	HDTV and SDTV	30 September 1983	Website
GDTV-3	体育频道	Sports	Cantonese, Mandarin	Terrestrial, cable and IPTV	HDTV and SDTV	28 August 1994	Website
GDTV-4	民生频道	Lifestyle and social news programming, alternative programming in selected cities/counties	Cantonese, Mandarin	Terrestrial, cable and IPTV	HDTV and SDTV	1 July 2002; 1 March 2023 (current People's livelihood channel)	Website
GDTV-5	新闻频道	News	Mandarin, some in Cantonese and English	Terrestrial, cable and IPTV	HDTV and SDTV	8 December 2005	Website
GDTV-6	嘉佳卡通	Kids' cartoon	Mandarin	Cable, IPTV and satellite	SDTV	16 September 2006	Website
GRT 4K	广东4K超高清频道	4K entertainment, documentaries and sports programming, the first 4K TV channel owned by provincial networks, the second 4K channel in China after CCTV 4K		Cable and IPTV	4K UHDTV	27 November 2017 (as GRT 4K Drama); 12 October 2018 (current UHD channel); 21 February 2023 (current 4K Ultra channel)	
TVS-1	经济科教频道	News, TV series, documentaries and lifestyle programming, formerly TVS-1	Mandarin	Terrestrial, cable and IPTV	HDTV and SDTV	1 July 2001	Website
TVS-2	大湾区卫视	Channel served for Cantonese diaspora. 2 separate versions of the channel served Guangdong and Worldwide between 2004 and 2022, formerly TVS-2/TVS-2★, TVS-★ and Southern Satellite TV	Cantonese	Terrestrial, cable, IPTV and satellite	HDTV and SDTV	1 July 2001	Website
TVS-4	影视频道	Canto-dubbed TV series and lifestyle programming, formerly TVS-4	Cantonese	Digital terrestrial, cable and IPTV	HDTV and SDTV	1 July 2001	Website
TVS-5	少儿频道	Kids channel, formerly TVS-5	Mandarin	Digital terrestrial, cable and IPTV	HDTV and SDTV	1 July 2001	Website
Premium channels
Lingnan Opera	岭南戏曲频道	Chinese opera channel featuring opera variants in the province		Cable and IPTV	SDTV	28 November 2007	Weibo page
Mobile Channel	移动频道	Channel intended for buses and portable platforms		Cable and IPTV	SDTV	1 November 2004	Website
Modern Education	现代教育频道	Educational programming	Cantonese, English, Mandarin	Cable and IPTV	SDTV	28 February 2012	Website
Southern Home Shopping	南方购物频道	Shopping channel	Cantonese, Mandarin	Cable and IPTV	SDTV		
Defunct channels
Win TV	欧洲足球频道	Association football (seasonal) and sports channel	Mandarin	-	SDTV	October 2005	defunct since 2017
Auto-Expo	汽车会展频道	Car and exposition industry channel	Mandarin	-	SDTV	2009	defunct since 2018
TVS-3	综艺频道	Entertainment channel	Cantonese, Mandarin	-	SDTV	1 July 2001	Website defunct since 2018
Cruise Travel	邮轮旅游频道	Travel-focused channel	Cantonese, Mandarin	Cable and IPTV	SDTV	June 2005	defunct since 2019
English Teaching	英语辅导频道	Teaching English as a Foreign Language channel in cooperation with Lancoo Media		Cable and IPTV	SDTV	2005	defunct since 2020
Pearl River Movie	珠江电影频道	Cantonese film and TV series channel in cooperation with Pearl River Film Studio	Cantonese	Cable and IPTV	SDTV	30 December 2008	Weibo page defunct since 2020
Golfbox Channel	高尔夫频道	Golf channel	English and Mandarin	Cable and IPTV	SDTV	1 January 2006	Website defunct since 2021
Channel Pet	快乐宠物频道	Pet-focused channel, in cooperation with BAMC Media in Beijing	Mandarin	Cable and IPTV	SDTV	September 20, 2005	defunct
Real Estate	房产频道	Real estate and lifestyle programming, in cooperation with the Guangzhou Broadcasting Network and Shenzhen Media Group		Cable and IPTV	SDTV	February 9, 2007	Website defunct since 2023
GRT World	国际频道	GRT's international channel, broadcast GRT's programmes	Cantonese, English, Mandarin	Terrestrial, cable and satellite	SDTV	18 January 2011	Website defunct since 2023

Name		Modulation	Frequency (in Guangzhou)	Main Languages	Broadcast area
News Radio	新闻广播 （广东应急广播）	AM; FM	648 kHz; 91.4 MHz	English, Mandarin	Guangdong
Southern Life Radio	南方生活广播	AM; FM	999 kHz; 93.6 MHz	Cantonese, Mandarin	Guangzhou
Business Radio	股市广播	AM; FM	927 kHz; 95.3 MHz	Cantonese, Mandarin	Guangzhou
Pearl Radio	珠江经济台	AM; FM	1062 kHz; 97.4 MHz	Cantonese	Guangdong and Macao
Music FM	音乐之声	FM	99.3 MHz	Cantonese, English and Mandarin	Guangdong
Voice of the City	城市之声	FM	103.6 MHz	Cantonese, Mandarin	Guangzhou
Guangzhou Traffic Radio	羊城交通台 （交通之声）	FM	105.2 MHz	Cantonese, Mandarin	Guangzhou
UVoice of Pearl River	珠江之声	FM	N/A (105.7 MHz in Shenzhen)	Cantonese, Mandarin	Shenzhen
Sports Radio	文体广播	FM	107.7 MHz	Cantonese, Mandarin	Guangzhou, Jiangmen and Dongguan
