= Music Pioneer Awards =

The Music Pioneer Awards (Chinese: 音乐先锋榜) was a Chinese music awards show produced by Music FM Radio Guangdong and other 23 Chinese provincial-level music radios. The first awards ceremony was held in 1987, and the event was last held in 2016.

== Categories ==
- Top 10 Songs – Mainland China
- Top 10 Songs – Hong Kong/Taiwan
- Top 5 Most Popular Male Singers
- Top 5 Most Popular Female Singers
- Most Popular Male Singer – Mainland China
- Most Popular Female Singer – Mainland China
- Most Popular Male Singer – Hong Kong/Taiwan
- Most Popular Female Singer – Hong Kong/Taiwan
- Best New Artist
- Most Potential New Artist – Mainland China
- Most Potential New Artist – Hong Kong/Taiwan
- Best New Group
- Best Group
- DJ Singer
- PengPeng.com Most Popular Male Singer
- PengPeng.com Most Popular Female Singer
- PengPeng.com Most Popular Group
- PengPeng.com Most Popular Song
- Best Performance
- Best Stage Performance
- Most Popular Collaboration
- Dance Music Award
- Best Original Song
- Best Lyrics
- Best Composition
- Best Music Arrangement
- Best Album
- Most Improved Award
- Most Film/Television Singer
- Best Film/Television Improved Award
- Best Songwriter
- Best New Songwriter
- Best Male Singer – Mainland China
- Best Female Singer – Mainland China
- Best Male Singer– Mainland China
- Best Female Singer– Mainland China
- Most Popular Singer
- Best Crossover Award
- Media Award
- Diamond Award
- Music King Award
