= Radio Guangdong Voice of the City =

Radio station in Guangdong, China

Coordinates: 23.1360°N 113.2567°E

- Company type: Government
- Industry: Radio broadcasting
- Headquarters: 686 Rd. Renmin North, Yuexiu District, Guangzhou, Guangdong, China
- Website: http://www.fm1036.com/

Radio Guangdong Voice of the City (Chinese: 广东电台城市之声; pinyin: Guǎngdōng Diàntái Chéngshì zhī Shēng) is a branch channel of Radio Guangdong, broadcasting news and information about Guangdong Province, China.
