= Guangdong Television =

Television station in Guangzhou, China

Guangdong Television 广东电视台
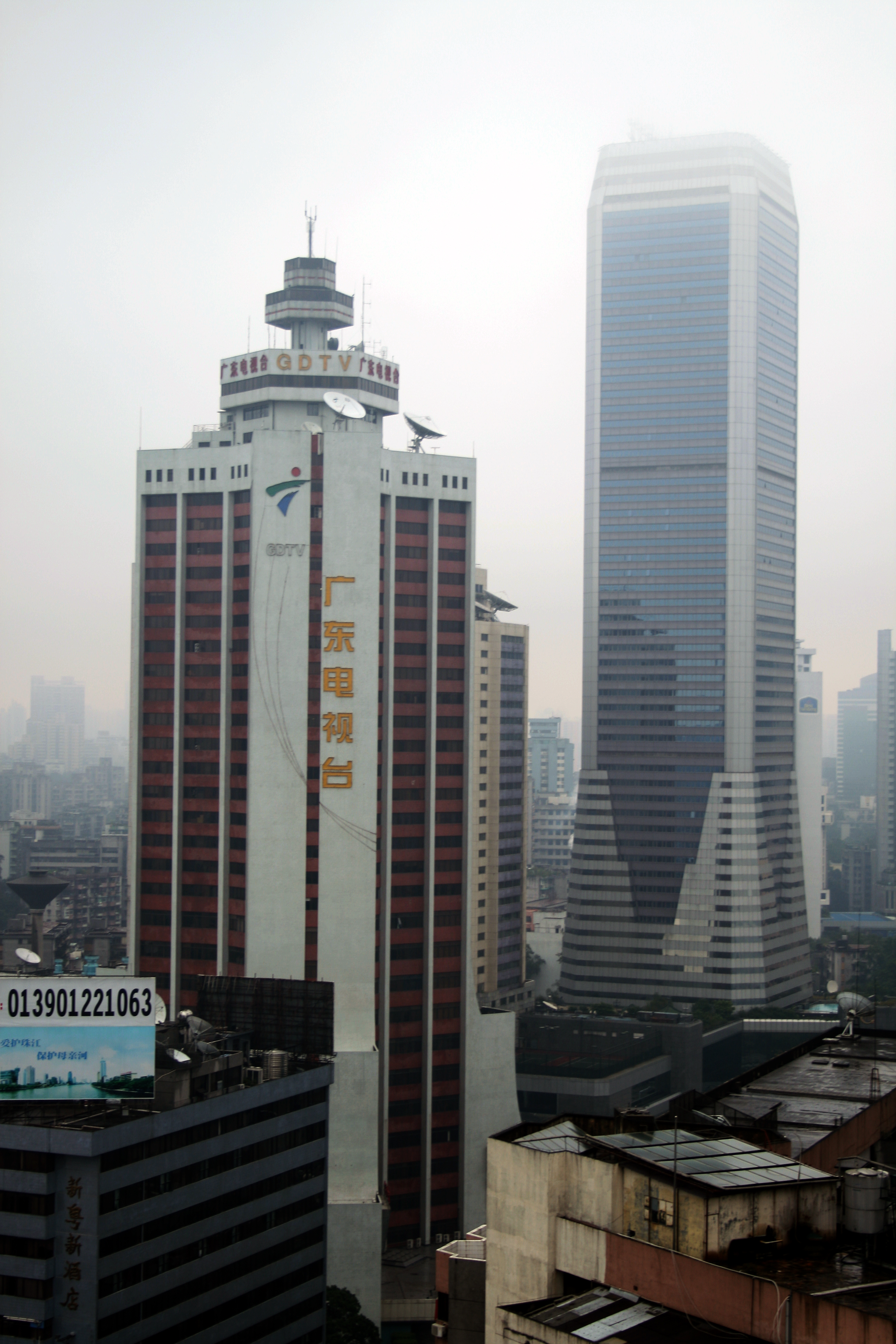
- Industry: Broadcast Television; Television Production
- Founded: 1959; 67 years ago
- Area served: Guangdong, China
- Owner: Southern Media Corporation
- Website: www.gdtv.com.cn

Guangdong Television (GDTV; Chinese: 广东电视台; pinyin: Guǎngdōng Diànshì Tái; Jyutping: Gwong^{2} dung^{1} din^{6} si^{6} toi^{4}) is a television station in Guangzhou, Guangdong province in China. Guangdong TV is the oldest television station in the province, which covers Guangdong and surrounding provinces. At present, Guangdong TV has a staff of around 1,800 people.

== History ==
=== GDTV beginnings ===
Guangdong Television was founded in 1959, which was initially named as Guangzhou TV Station. At that time, it was under the administrative division under the Guangdong People's Radio. Late in September of that year, Guangdong-Taiwan towers was built in the top of Yuexiu Hill monument, and began to broadcast programmes in black and white. The station broadcast on VHF channel 1.

=== Development (1960–1979) ===
On 1 January 1960, the first program broadcast on Guangdong TV was Who is the Uncle. Later, in July, Guangdong TV opened a second channel. In 1963, the station wanted to produce its films overseas with the help of other film companies, but that did not find any chance of success until Beijing Television agreed to do so in 1964. Yuexiu Mountain Tower officially began operations in 1966.

In 1970, GDTV produced a TV documentary called From the Romanian mountains and rivers set ambitious. It is made of optical Interest Videos, making 30 copies of the film distribution companies pay issue, Guangdong Province. As a result, GDTV became the first in the whole of Guangdong-Taiwan Province to distribute television documentaries. In April 1971, 7.5 kilowatts black and white television transmitters were installed and operated officially. During that year, nearly 30 people began to build a television photographer corps, which they distributed in nine regions across the province. The municipal and the People's Liberation Army and the provincial and municipal units of some have cameras.

In 1972, GDTV filmed the first color television documentary, Shek Wan Ceramics blossoming of new flowers. The following year, the use of colour video was first introduced (Philip 2 inch machine). In 1974, GDTV did expand to eight channels, which some of them broadcast in colour and the transmitting power was 10 kW. Later that year, the colour TV broadcast system was formally established.

In 1976, the two primary channels finally in colour. A year later, another channel was operational that was specifically targeting Cantonese speakers. At that time, the use of the first trucks that carry colour television was operational. By 1978, remote cameras were also in use.

On 1 January 1979, Guangzhou TV Station was formally renamed Guangdong TV. With Radio Television Hong Kong (RTHK), GDTV produced a show to promote Hong Kong and Guangdong cultural ties with far-reaching significance. As a result, this is the first cooperation between the mainland China and Hong Kong in comprehensive television programs. In early April, Guangdong-Taiwan set up TV advertising. Advertising Bureau and Hong Kong, Wen Wei Po, Hong Kong, Chua advertising company signed a contract agent in Hong Kong and Macau in order to start the advertising business. In August of that year, after the Cultural Revolution, the first self-recorded TV shows on GDTV was Small Two Brothers (multi-machine video plus video), which was organized by the National network television.

=== New logo and rise of programming (1980–1999) ===
In 1980, a new logo was debuted for GDTV. During the same year, one of its programmes, Black Peony, was shown along with the first music single that debuted. In 1981, more programmes began its broadcast, such as Hong Kong and Macau Dynamic, International Review, and Flowered. Later that year, GDTV debuted movies that are broadcast in Cantonese or Mandarin. In addition, Woodcrest Hill in the Guangzhou area started reception. In early 1982, a home-made first full TV series named Prawn Biography made its debut on GDTV. In May 1982, Guangdong TV Weekly, a magazine, was established.

In 1983, Chinese subtitles appeared on GDTV for its programs. In mid-June, about 70 participants were trained for its first ever voice training, which were divided into Cantonese and Mandarin. Other programmes that made its debut during that year included a lesson on speaking Mandarin and Art Appreciation. In 1984, the first programme that was aimed at deaf or hearing-impaired viewers made its debut on GDTV. By 1986, the majority of GDTV's channels (at 14) started to broadcast sports programming from abroad.

In 1988, two of GDTV's channels were renamed South Guangdong TV. It is aimed specifically at viewers that lived in the southern Guangdong area, primarily near Hong Kong and Macau. During the same year, the series Boat was honoured with the first international gold medal.

In 1989, the first subtitles using computers made its debut on GDTV channels. Later that year, GDTV and Asahi Broadcasting Corporation started to cooperate in sharing news resources with each other. In addition, Economic 90 made its debut on GDTV.

== See also ==
- Guangdong Radio and Television
- Guangzhou Television
- Television Southern
- Jia Yu Channel (Malaysia)
- Kah Lai Toi (Malaysia)
- WOWtv (Canada)
