= Radio Guangdong =

Provincial radio broadcaster in Guangdong, China

Radio Guangdong 广东人民广播电台
- Company type: Government
- Industry: Radio broadcasting, Newspaper
- Founded: 1949
- Headquarters: 686 Renmin Road North, Yuexiu District, Guangzhou, Guangdong, People's Republic of China
- Key people: Zeng Shaohua
- Products: News, Entertainment, Music
- Website: www.rgd.com.cn

Radio Guangdong
- Traditional Chinese: 廣東電台
- Simplified Chinese: 广东电台
Transcriptions
Standard Mandarin
- Hanyu Pinyin: Guǎngdōng Diàntái
Yue: Cantonese
- Jyutping: Gwong^{2}dung^{1} Din^{6}toi^{4}

Radio Guangdong is a provincially-owned radio station in Guangdong, owns nine radio channels and two newspapers. Radio Guangdong is a part of Guangdong Radio and Television, and is a member of World Radio Network.

== History ==
Radio Guangdong started as Radio Canton, a radio station in Canton, the capital city of Guangdong Province. It first broadcast on 18 October 1949 and was renamed "Radio Guangdong" on 16 February 1950. Radio Guangdong was also the first radio station among Chinese Radio Industry to set up an Internet website which was started on 15 December 1996.

== Radio channels ==
Channel Name	Modulation	Frequency in Guangzhou area	Main Languages as notes
Radio Guangdong News Radio (广东电台新闻广播)	AM; FM	648 kHz; 91.4 MHz	English and Mandarin Formerly Satellite Radio Guangdong (广东卫星广播)
Southern Life Radio (南方生活广播)	AM; FM	999 kHz; 93.6 MHz	Cantonese and Mandarin
Business Radio (股市广播)	AM; FM	927 kHz; 95.3 MHz	Cantonese and Mandarin
Radio Pearl River (珠江经济广播电台)	AM; FM	1062 kHz; 97.4, 103.0 MHz	Cantonese
Music FM (音乐之声)	FM	93.9, 99.3 MHz	Cantonese, English and Mandarin
Car FM (广东电台城市之声)	FM	103.6 MHz	Cantonese and Mandarin
Guangzhou Traffic Radio (广东电台交通之声)	FM	105.2 MHz	Cantonese and Mandarin
URadio Shenzhen (广东电台南粤之声)	FM	105.7 MHz	Mandarin
Sports FM (广东电台文体广播)	FM	107.7 MHz	Cantonese and Mandarin

== Newspapers ==
- Sheng Bao (声报, lit. voice paper, former 广东广播报, lit. Guangdong Broadcast News)
- Gushi Kuaibao (股市快报, lit. Stock Market News)
