= Jia Yu Channel =

Programming
- Picture format: SDTV 576i

History
- Launched: 17 November 2005 (Malaysia and Hong Kong); 26 April 2007 (on Astro); 17 November 2009 (Taiwan as Jia Yu International)
- Closed: 31 August 2009 (now TV); 1 April 2014 (Astro & Kristal-Astro); 1 February 2016 (as Jia Yu International on CHT MOD)
- Replaced by: Kah Lai Toi

Jia Yu Channel (Chinese: 家娱频道, pinyin: jiāyú píndào) was a 24-hour Mandarin and Cantonese subscription channel in Malaysia and Singapore, broadcasting under the slogan "Wholesome family entertainment".

This channel was launched on 17 November 2005 by the then-Information Minister Datuk Seri Abdul Kadir Sheikh Fadzir. The channel ceased broadcasting on 1 April 2014, but Astro channel 304 remained on air to broadcast selected programming before its new channel, Kah Lai Toi began its broadcasting a month later.

70% of the content is from Guangdong Television (GDTV) in China and Hong Kong, while the remaining is sourced from Cosmos Discovery Sdn Bhd, a local production company.

== Jia Yu International ==
Jia Yu International was a Chinese TV channel from Guangdong, Taiwan and Malaysia broadcasting in Taiwan also the programmes from Yoshimoto Kogyo and movies. This channel was launched in 2009. Available on MOD Channel 87. The channel was closed and replaced by KLT-Golden TV International in February 2016.

== Programmes ==
- The Ideal Couple
- The House of 72 Tenants
- The Family
- Liztening
- The Feeling Show
- Battle of Chefs
- Family Whizz
- Health Through Science
- Faye's Online
- Blue Jewel
- Angel
- Food Travel
- M Magazine
- Lady on the Land
- New Year New Beginning
- Jia Yu Chinese New Year Celebration 2014
- Joyful Years
- Documentary Zone
- Yummy
- Fun Travel
- Bitter Taste of Success
- Friends
- I, My Brother
- The Best of Cantonese Art
- Masquerade
- With Father Around
- The Story of Hakka
- Formula X (Jia Yu's animation series)
- Focus Today
- i-Travel
- Approaching Dongguan
- The Mystery Revelation
- Daughter in Law
- Cantonese Art
- GDTV News
- Today Jiang Men
- Nanhai Brezze
- Zhuhai Economic Special Zone
- Food Hunt
- Travelling Tips
- Antique Collection
- The Story of Hakka
- Guangdong Today
- Booming Entertainment
- Crimson Sword Quest
- Pleasant Pearl River
- Brave Calf
- Watch & Talk
- Pearl River Highlights
- 26 World Famous Tales
- The King of Mic – Cantonese Song Competition
- Golden Lifestyle
- The Essence of Love
- History Maker
- Fun Zone
- Godbeast Megazord
- S.O.S. (Spirit of Sound)
- JM Bear
- Fashion
- Free & Easy
- Health Recipe
- Noon News
- Survivor Challenge
- News Online
- Chinese Talk
- Let's Tour
- Travel with Star
- At life's End
- For the Worthy Causes
- MY Entertainment
- Unreachable Zone of Darkness
- Super Challenge
- P.S. I Miss You
- Pop Star 2012 Singing Competition
- My Big Day
- Aces Go Places
- Aces Go Places II
- The Best of Cantonese Art
- The Tricks of Fate
- Trials & Tribulation
- Fun Travel
- Glitter with Wong Chee Keong
- Torn Between Two Lovers
- Pioneer
- Desperate Conscience
- Legacy of Time
- All You Can Eat
- Circle of Dragons
- Perfect Match
- Future Star
- Asian New Force
- Best Trips Around the World
- Overseas Zhongshanese
- Mary Go Round
- Zhongshan Story
- BrandCook
- Minky Momo
- Offside
- Doctor Lam
- The Emperor Han Wu
- Tsukuyomi: Moon Phase
- Nanning with Asean
- Butterfly Song
- Janken Man
- Monster
- Bluster
- Great Desire
- Single Family
- Single Family II
- Start from Hong Kong
- Music Rides
- EEG Fun Fun Fun
- Taste of Hong Kong
- Overseas Zhongshanese in North America
- In Search of Medical Breakthrough
- Ransom Express
- Guilty or Not

== Programming block ==
- Glitter with... – Malaysian Chinese Actor/Actress of the month
- Insight Guangdong – Cantonese Information programmes from GDTV Pearl International
