= Music FM Radio Guangdong =

Radio station in Guangdong Province, China

China
- Broadcast area: Guangdong
- Frequency: See list

Ownership
- Owner: Guangdong Radio and Television

History
- First air date: 29 December 1980

Music FM Radio Guangdong (Chinese: 广东电台音乐之声; lit. 'Radio of Guangdong', 'Sound of Music'), which uses the moniker "Music FM", is a music radio station on 99.3 FM in Guangzhou, Guangdong, China. It is owned by Radio Guangdong, a part of Guangdong Radio and Television.

== History ==
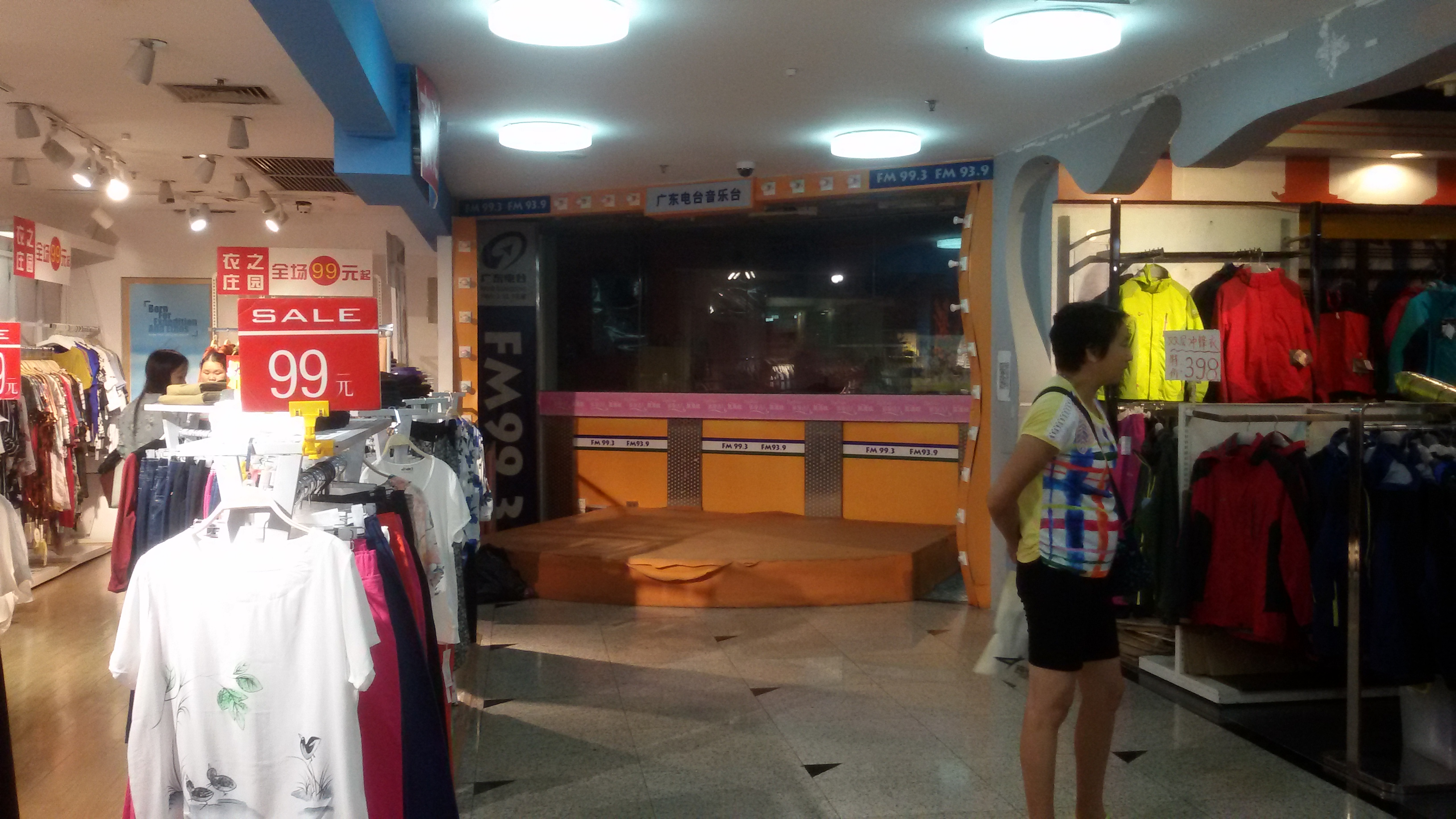
Former remote studio in a clothing store

The station was founded in December 1980 as the first stereo FM outlet in mainland China.

== Frequencies ==
=== FM ===
- 93.9 MHz (Pearl River Delta)
- 96.8 MHz (Meizhou)
- 99.3 MHz (Guangzhou, Xinjiang)
- 102.3 MHz (Shaoguan)

=== AM ===
- 747 kHz (Heyuan)
- 927 kHz (Chaozhou, Huizhou, Shantou)
- 1008 kHz (Shenzhen)
- 1422 kHz (Jiangmen)
