= Guangzhou Broadcasting Network =

Chinese television network

- Type: State media broadcaster
- Country: China
- Availability: Guangzhou and neighbouring cities
- Official website: www.gztv.com
- Language: Cantonese; Mandarin (selected programmes only)

The Guangzhou Broadcasting Network (Chinese: 广州广播电视台; pinyin: Guǎngzhōu Guǎngbò Diànshìtái; Jyutping: Gwong^{2}zau^{1}gwong^{2}bo^{3}din^{6}si^{6}toi^{4}), also known as GZBN, is a municipally owned television network in Guangzhou, Guangdong, China. The television department made its first broadcast on 10 January 1988, while radio department made its first broadcast on 1 December 1991. The GZBN is also owns a cable company and a showbiz newspaper, and owns Sky Link TV in the US.

== History ==
Guangdong Television used the name Guangzhou Television from 1959 to 1979. In September 1987, Guangzhou Television was officially established. Broadcasts started on 10 January 1988 on UHF channel 34.

On 10 January 2000, it unveiled a new spherical logo and the slogan "Impactful News, Unmissable Entertainment".

== Television ==
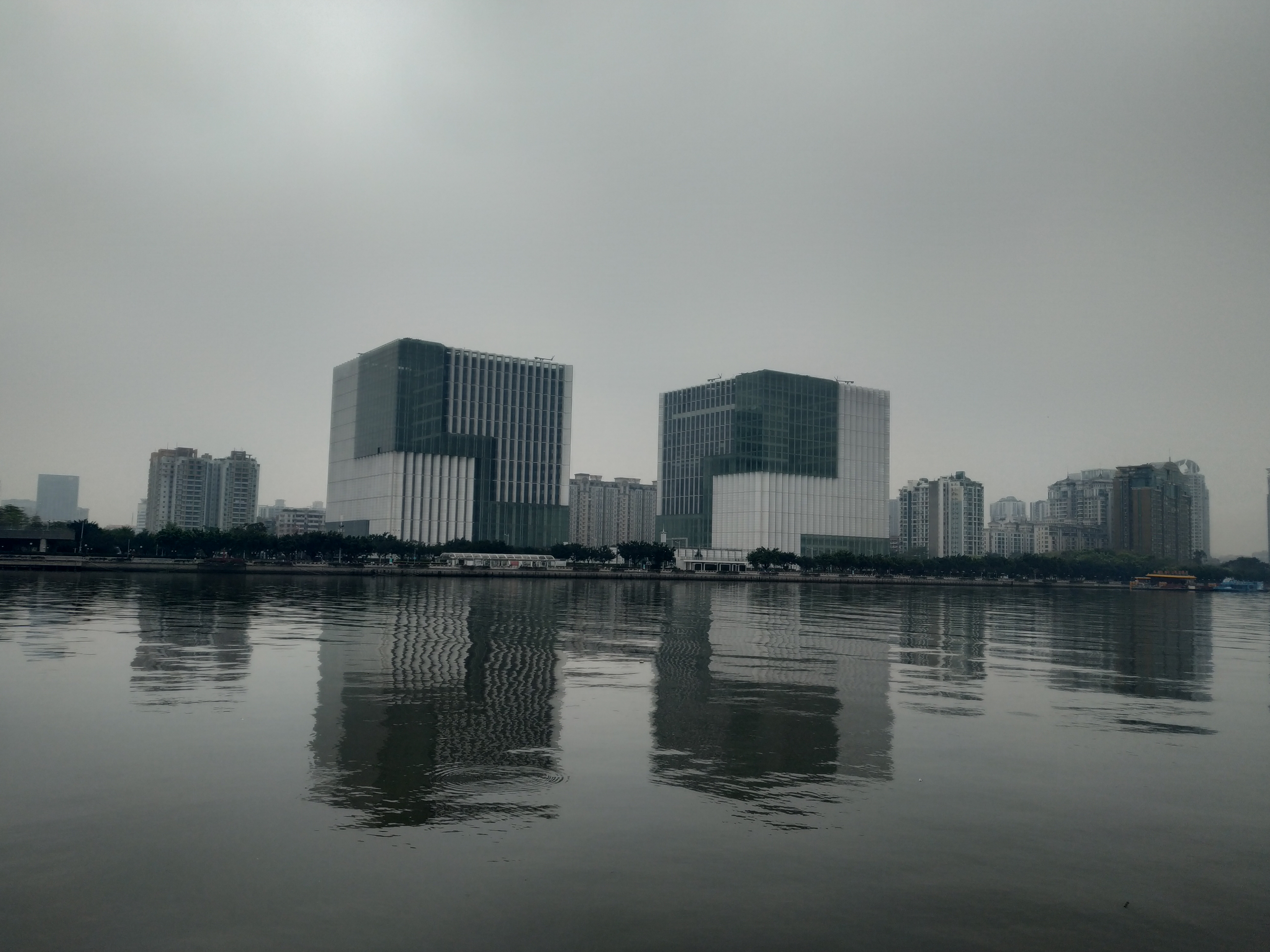
New headquarters of the network's TV department, The Guangzhou International Media Harbour. (2019)

- General (Chinese: 广州综合频道): launched in 1988 with news, TV series, entertainment, lifestyle and public affairs programming. Available in SD and HD since February 2018.
- News (Chinese: 广州新闻频道): launched in 1992 with local news and documentaries. Available in SD and HD since February 2018.
- Drama (Chinese: 广州影视频道): launched in 1994 with TV series, currently airs Canto-dubbed series. Available in SD and HD
- Sport (Chinese: 广州竞赛频道): launched in 1994 with simulcasts of Star Sports Network, now the partner and home broadcaster of local basketball team Guangzhou Long-Lions. Available in SD and HD
- Legal (Chinese: 广州法治频道): launched in 1994 with the name Guangzhou TV Economic, currently airs Mandarin TV series and legal programming. Available in SD and HD
- TV Ultra HD (Chinese: 广州南国都市频道): Mandarin-language 4K TV channel launched in 2020 to replace Kids, Lifestyle and Shopping channels. The channel is the first UHD channel owned by a Chinese municipal broadcaster.

=== Defunct channels ===
- Lifestyle (Chinese: 广州生活频道): on air between 1994 and 2020, previously airs English-language programming under the name "I Channel" from 2005 to 2014.
- Kids (Chinese: 广州少儿频道): airs kids' programming mostly in Mandarin, on air between 2005 and 2020.
- Shopping (Chinese: 广州购物频道): airs teleshopping and infomercials from different companies, on air between 2006 and 2020.
- Gov (Chinese: 广州花城频道): airs government affairs programming, on air between 2016 and 2017, currently serves as a production unit.

== Radio ==
- News Radio (FM 96.2MHz, Chinese: 广州新闻电台): News and talk format
- Car Music Radio (FM 102.7MHz, Chinese: 广州汽车音乐电台): music format
- Traffic Radio (FM 106.1MHz & AM 1098kHz, Chinese: 广州交通电台): traffic updates, also served as the emergency broadcasting service "Guangzhou Emergency Radio" (Chinese: 广州应急广播)
- Teens Radio (FM 88.0MHz & AM 1170kHz, Chinese: 青少年广播): music format under the My FM China branding, also known as "Guangzhou My FM88.0"

== Controversies ==
In a New Year's Eve programming produced by the network in 2015, one performance from a local musical play about Cantonese opera came under fire in the community over its use of Mandarin Chinese.

A video report edited by the network's social media team were claimed "misleading" by medical personnel during the COVID-19 pandemic over steaming medical masks for re-use.

== See also ==
- Guangdong Radio and Television - using the name Guangzhou Television from 1959 to 1979
- Guangzhou TV Tower
