= JJ Lin discography =

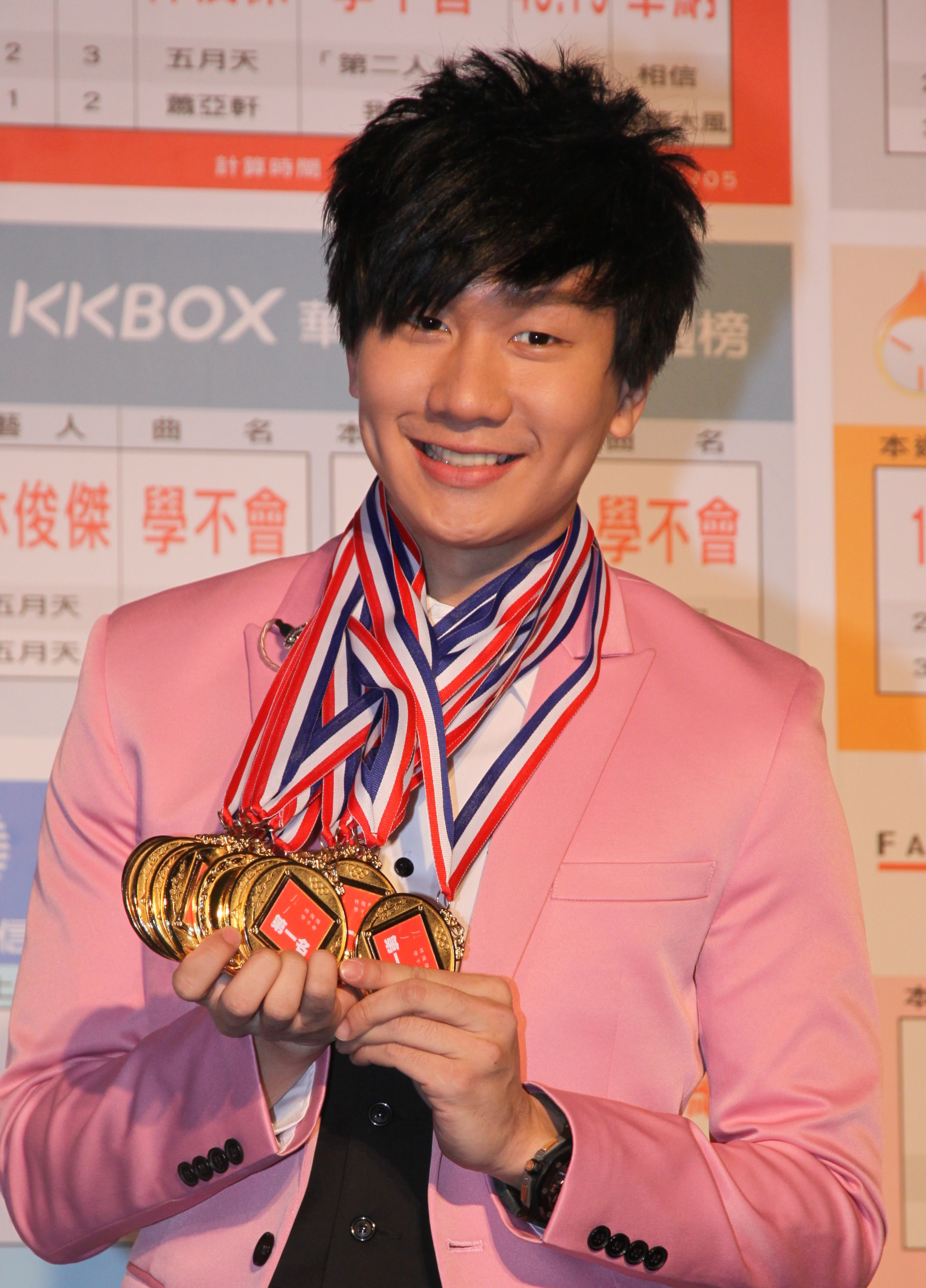
- Lin in 2012
- Studio albums: 15
- Live albums: 3
- Compilation albums: 2
- Video albums: 1

This is the discography of Singaporean singer-songwriter JJ Lin (Chinese: 林俊杰). Lin has released fifteen studio albums, two compilation albums, three live albums, one video album and one documentary. Lin made his debut in 2003 with the studio album Music Voyager, which sold over 1,200,000 copies across Asia. His fifth studio album, Cao Cao (2006), sold over 2,000,000 copies across Asia including over 200,000 copies in Taiwan. His next two albums would also sell over 1,000,000 copies throughout Asia.

Four of Lin's albums have been certified platinum by the Recording Industry Association Singapore (RIAS) as of 2021 for surpassing sales of over 10,000 units, while Message in a Bottle (2017) was certified gold. Several of Lin's singles have garnered over 4,000,000 downloads in mainland China.

== Albums ==
=== Studio albums ===
List of studio albums, showing selected details, sales figures, and certifications
Title	Details	Peak chart positions				Sales	Certifications
Title	Details	SGP	HK	TWN	US World	Sales	Certifications
Music Voyager (樂行者)	Released: 10 April 2003; Label: Ocean Butterflies; Format: CD, digital download	5	—	—	—	Asia: 1,200,000	
Haven (第二天堂)	Released: 8 June 2004; Label: Ocean Butterflies; Format: CD, digital download	5	—	—	—	Asia: 1,800,000	
No. 89757 (編號89757)	Released: 1 April 2005; Label: Ocean Butterflies; Format: CD, digital download	1	—	—	—	Asia: 1,500,000	
Cao Cao (曹操)	Released: 17 February 2006; Label: Ocean Butterflies; Format: CD, digital download	—	—	2	—	Asia: 2,000,000; TWN: 200,000	
Westside (西界)	Released: 29 June 2007; Label: Ocean Butterflies; Format: CD, digital download	—	—	2	—	Asia: 1,600,000	
Sixology (JJ陸)	Released: 18 October 2008; Label: Ocean Butterflies; Format: CD, digital download	—	—	5	—	Asia: 1,000,000	
Hundred Days (100 天)	Released: 18 December 2009; Label: Ocean Butterflies; Format: CD, digital download	—	—	2	—		
She Says (她說)	Released: 8 December 2010; Label: Ocean Butterflies; Format: CD, digital download	—	—	9	—		
Lost N Found (學不會)	Released: 31 December 2011; Label: Warner Music Taiwan; Format: CD, digital download	—	5	1	—	TWN: 55,000; SGP: 10,000 (Note: Sales figures are based on certification alone.)	RIAS: Platinum
Stories Untold (因你而在)	Released: 13 March 2013; Label: Warner Music Taiwan; Format: CD, digital download	—	8	1	—	TWN: 78,000; SGP: 10,000	RIAS: Platinum
Genesis (新地球)	Released: 27 December 2014; Label: Warner Music Taiwan; Format: CD, digital download	—	6	1	9	TWN: 95,000; SGP: 10,000	RIAS: Platinum
From M.E. to Myself (和自己對话)	Released: 25 December 2015; Label: Warner Music Taiwan; Format: CD, digital download	—	10	1	—	TWN: 90,000; SGP: 10,000; CHN: 227,439 (dl.)	RIAS: Platinum
Message in a Bottle (伟大的渺小)	Released: 29 December 2017; Label: Warner Music Taiwan; Format: CD, digital download	—	3	1	—	CHN: 1,222,404 (dl.); SGP: 5,000	RIAS: Gold
Drifter / Like You Do (倖存者·如你)	Released: 20 October 2020; Label: Warner Music Taiwan; Format: CD, digital download	—	6	1	—	CHN: 1,355,401 (dl.)	
Happily, Painfully After (重拾_快樂)	Released: 21 April 2023; Label: JFJ Productions; Format: Digital download	—	—	1	—	CHN: 926,535 (dl.)	
"—" denotes releases that did not chart, were not released in that region, or chart did not exist.

=== Compilation albums ===
Title	Details
Longing for Love (期待愛)	Released: 15 February 2008; Label: Ocean Butterflies; Format: CD, digital download
He's JJ Lin (他是)	Released: 21 December 2012; Label: Ocean Butterflies; Format: CD, digital download

=== Live albums ===
Title	Details	Peak chart positions
Title	Details	TWN DVD
Just JJ World Tour 2006 (2006就是俊傑世界巡迥演唱會)	Released: 29 December 2006; Label: Ocean Butterflies; Format: CD, digital download	1
A Night of Love and Music Live in Taipei (100天Love音樂實錄)	Released: 2 July 2010; Label: Ocean Butterflies; Format: CD, digital download	2
I Am World Tour Live in Taipei 2011	Released: 8 November 2011; Label: Ocean Butterflies; Format: CD, digital download	4

=== Video albums ===
Title	Details
The Best (雙霸)	Released: 8 November 2007; Label: Ocean Butterflies; Format: CD, digital download

=== Documentaries ===
Title	Details
If Miracles Had a Sound (听‧见林俊杰)	Released: 19 August 2016 (DVD); Label: Warner Music Taiwan; Format: CD, digital download

=== English EP ===
Title	Details
林俊傑 JJ Lin iTunes Session EP	Released: 18 July 2014 (iTunes); Label: Warner Music Taiwan; Format: Digital download

=== Single albums ===
Title	Details	Sales
Just Jazzin' (感爵這一刻)	Released: 22 December 2020; Label: JFJ Productions; Format: Digital download	CHN: 225,299
一定会/After The Rain	Released: 29 November 2021; Label: JFJ Productions; Format: Digital download	CHN: 776,104

== Singles ==
=== 2000s ===
Title	Year	Peak chart positions	Album
Title	Year	SGP Reg.	Album
"Someday" (會有那麼一天)	2003	—	Music Voyager
"Wings" (翅膀)	2003	—	Music Voyager
"Freeze" (凍結)	2003	—	Music Voyager
"River South" (江南)	2004	—	Haven
"Bullet Train" (子彈列車)	2004	—	Haven
"Mermaid" (美人魚)	2004	—	Haven
"A Thousand Years Later" (一千年以後)	2005	—	No. 89757
"Simply" (簡簡單單)	2005	—	No. 89757
"The Mummy" (木乃伊)	2005	—	No. 89757
"Popular Bishop" (流行主教)	2006	—	Non-album single
"Truth" (原來)	2006	—	Cao Cao
"Cao Cao" (曹操)	2006	—	Cao Cao
"Sarangheyo" (只對你說)	2006	—	Cao Cao
"Love is in the Air" (发现爱) (featuring Kym)	2007	—	Non-album single
"Westside" (西界)	2007	—	Westside
"The Killa" (殺手)	2007	—	Westside
"Hurray" (一起搖)	2007	—	Non-album single
"Dimples" (小酒窩) (featuring Charlene Choi)	2008	—	Sixology
"Tales of the Red Cliff" (醉赤壁)	2008	16	Sixology
"I Still Miss Her" (我還想她)	2008	—	Sixology
"Back to Back" (背對背擁抱)	2009	29	Hundred Days
"Hundred Days" (第幾個100天)	2009	—	Hundred Days
"Go!" (featuring MC HotDog)	2009	—	Hundred Days
"—" denotes that chart did not exist or was not released in that region.

=== 2010s ===
Title	Year	Peak chart positions				Sales	Album
Title	Year	SGP	SGP Reg.	CHN Billb.	CHN TME	Sales	Album
"She Says" (她說)	2010	—	10	—	—		She Says
"When You" (當你)	2010	—	—	—	—		She Says
"Smiling Eyes" (愛笑的眼睛)	2010	—	—	—	—		She Says
"Remember" (記得)	2010	—	—	—	—		She Says
"Never Learn" (學不會)	2011	—	—	—	—		Lost N Found
"Those Were the Days" (那些你很冒險的夢)	2012	15	2	—	—		Lost N Found
"Love U U"	2012	—	—	—	—		Lost N Found
"Practice Love" (修煉愛情)	2013	—	13	—	—		Stories Untold
"Before Sunrise" (裂縫中的陽光)	2013	—	—	—	—		Stories Untold
"If Only" (可惜沒如果)	2014	—	7	—	—		Genesis
"Beautiful" (手心的薔薇) (featuring G.E.M.)	2014	—	26	—	—		Genesis
"The Romantic" (浪漫血液)	2014	—	—	—	—		Genesis
"Checkmate" (with Jung Yong-hwa)	2015	—	—	—	—		Non-album single
"Twilight" (不為誰而作的歌)	2015	23	4	1	—	CHN: 2,042,052	From M.E. to Myself
"The Key" (關鍵詞)	2015	—	—	2	—		From M.E. to Myself
"Infinity and Beyond" (超越无限)	2016	—	—	10	—		Non-album single
"Little Big Us" (偉大的渺小)	2017	—	—	1	—	CHN: 820,128	Message in a Bottle
"Message in a Bottle" (小瓶子)	2017	—	—	—	—	CHN: 402,813	Message in a Bottle
"53 Dawns" (黑夜問白天)	2017	—	19	2	—	CHN: 5,717,499	Non-album singles
"Despacito" (缓缓) (with Luis Fonsi)	2018	—	—	—	—		Non-album singles
"Under the Cloud" (飛雲之下) (with Han Hong)	2018	—	—	—	—		Non-album singles
"Resurgence" (進階)	2018	—	—	3	5	CHN: 1,053,711	Non-album singles
"Better Days" (我們很好)"	2019	—	—	5	1	CHN: 1,885,142	Non-album singles
"Show the World"	2019	—	—	—	32	CHN: 339,284	Non-album singles
"The Right Time" (對的時間點)	2019	10	1	—	1	CHN: 892,159	Non-album singles
"The Story of Us" (將故事寫成我們)	2019	21	4	—	2	CHN: 6,231,867	Non-album singles
"Wonderland"	2019	—	—	—	1	CHN: 893,507	Non-album singles
"As I Believe"	2019	—	—	—	—		Non-album singles
"—" denotes releases that did not chart, chart did not exist, or was not released in that region.

=== 2020s ===
Title	Year	Peak chart positions		Sales	Album
Title	Year	SGP Reg.	CHN TME	Sales	Album
"Stay With You"	2020	—	13		Non-album singles
"Hello"	2020	—	21		Non-album singles
"No Filter" (無濾鏡)	2020	—	3		Non-album singles
"No Turning Back" (交換餘生)	2020	11	1	CHN: 9,520,647	Drifter • Like You Do
"While I Can"	2020	—	8		Non-album singles
"Should've Let Go" (過) (with Jackson Wang)	2020	8	—		Non-album singles
"Bedroom" (featuring Anne-Marie)	2021	2	22		Drifter • Like You Do
"Light of Sanctuary" (裹著心的光)	2021	—	4	CHN: 4,532,131	Non-album singles
"At Least I Had You" (with Gentle Bones)	2021	7	7		Non-album singles
"We Will" (一定会)	2021	—	2		一定会/After The Rain
"After the Rain"	2021	—	19		一定会/After The Rain
"From the Ashes"	2022	—	—		Non-album singles
"Unchained" (無拘)	2022	—	15		Non-album singles
"JJ20" (7千3百多天)	2022	—	12	CHN: 399,581	Happily, Painfully After
"Hero" (謝幕)	2023	—	21	CHN: 556,453	Happily, Painfully After
"In the Joy" (featuring Anderson .Paak)	2023	—	86		Non-album single
"Dust and Ashes" (願與愁)	2023	—	10	CHN: 937,040	Happily, Painfully After
"The Show" (with Steve Aoki)	2023	—	57		Non-album singles
"The Relentless" (with Power Station)	2024	—	9		Non-album singles
"Shut Up" (绝不绝)	2024	—	29		Non-album singles
"—" denotes releases that did not chart or was not released in that region.

== Others ==
=== Movies ===
- Love You You 夏日乐悠悠 (2011) - Music director for film score and soundtrack

=== Video games ===
- Dota 2 - JJ Lin Timekeeper Music Pack Bundle (2016)
