= Sanctuary World Tour =

2018–2019 concert tour by JJ Lin

- World tour by JJ Lin
- Promotional poster for Singapore Indoor Stadium concerts
- Location: Asia; Oceania
- Associated album: Message in a Bottle
- Start date: 17 March 2018
- End date: 22 December 2019
- Legs: 2
- No. of shows: 66
- Attendance: 1,600,000

JJ Lin concert chronology
- Timeline World Tour (2013–2015); Sanctuary World Tour (2018–2019); JJ20 World Tour (2022–2024)

Sanctuary World Tour (Chinese: 圣所世界巡回演唱会) was the fifth concert tour by Singaporean singer and songwriter JJ Lin. It began on 17 March 2018, in Shanghai, China, and spanned a total of 66 performances across Asia and Australia. The tour attracted a total of approximately 1,600,000 attendees.

== Background and development ==
The Sanctuary World Tour officially kicked off on 17 March 2018, at the Mercedes-Benz Arena in Shanghai. Due to the enthusiastic response from the audience, additional performances were added in Shanghai, Wuhan, Shenzhen, and other cities. In Singapore and Taipei, the shows were extended to four performances each, setting a new record for JJ Lin's solo concerts. The first stage of the tour concluded on 11 March 2019, in Melbourne.

The second stage of the tour, titled Sanctuary 2.0, began on 23 March 2019, at the Huanglong Sports Center Stadium in Hangzhou. On 11 November, it was announced that the Australian leg would take place at the Stadium Australia in Sydney on 7 March of the following year. On 21 and 22 December, the tour reached the Singapore National Stadium. This marked JJ Lin's first solo concert at the venue, making him the first Chinese singer to hold two consecutive concerts there. The tour was scheduled to perform in stadiums across more than 20 cities in Asia in 2019, marking JJ Lin's first large-scale stadium tour since his debut.

On 31 December 2019, JJ Lin announced via a social media live broadcast that the third phase of the Sanctuary concert, "Sanctuary: Wonderland", would commence, with performances planned in seven cities. However, due to the COVID-19 pandemic, it was officially announced on 31 January 2020, that the Shanghai and Nanning stops, which had already sold out, would be postponed. On 7 February, it was further announced that the Australian stop would also be postponed.

On 27 March 2021, JJ Lin held an online press conference to announce that the Sanctuary Finale online concert would be launched globally on 6 June. However, on 18 May, the organizer announced another postponement due to COVID-19. The concert was finally broadcast on 10 July through Sistic Live Stream and TME Live under Tencent Music.

== Commercial performance ==
The Sanctuary World Tour sold 995,402 tickets and grossed US$107.57 million in 2019 alone, making it the top-grossing Chinese tour of the year and ranking 16th worldwide.

== Set list ==
Sanctuary World Tour on 17 March 2018 in Shanghai
1. "A Thousand Years Later"
2. "Brave New World"
3. "Sanctuary"
4. "Lord Vader"
5. "Romantic Mystery"
6. "Westside"
7. "Raindrops"
8. "The Key"
9. "Love U U"
10. "Those Were The Days"
11. "Tomorrow"
12. "The Killa"
13. "Mermaid"
14. "Stay"
15. "If Only"
16. "53 Dawns"
17. "Back To Back"
18. "She Says"
19. "Remember"
20. "Practice Love"
21. "The Romantic"
22. "Paper Clouds"
23. "Dimples"
24. "Eagle's Eye"
25. "High Fashion"
26. "You N Me"
27. "Own The Day"
28. "I Will Always Love You" (feat. David Foster)
29. "Winter Games" (feat. David Foster)
30. "Little Big Us"

Encore

31. "River South"
32. "Message in a bottle"
33. "Twilight"
Sanctuary 2.0 World Tour on 23 March 2019 in Hangzhou
1. "Cao Cao"
2. "Brave New World"
3. "Sanctuary"
4. "Lord Vader"
5. "Romantic Mystery"
6. "The One"
7. "Obsession"
8. "The Key"
9. "Always Online"
10. "Those Were The Days"
11. "Tomorrow"
12. "The Killa"
13. "The Dark Knight"
14. "Never Learn"
15. "If Only"
16. "53 Dawns"
17. "Hundred Days"
18. "She Says"
19. "Remember"
20. "Freeze"
21. "Practice Love"
22. "The Sounds of Snowfall"
23. "Paper Clouds"
24. "Before Sunrise"
25. "Eagle's Eye"
26. "High Fashion "
27. "You N Me"
28. "Own The Day"
29. "Little Big Us"

Encore

30. "Resurgence"
31. "River South"
32. "Twilight"

== Tour dates ==
Sanctuary World Tour dates
| Date | City | Country | Venue | Attendance | Revenue |
|---|---|---|---|---|---|
| 17 March 2018 | Shanghai | China | Mercedes-Benz Arena | — | — |
| 18 March 2018 | Shanghai | China | Mercedes-Benz Arena | — | — |
| 30 March 2018 | Wuhan | China | Optics Valley International Tennis Center | 20,000 | — |
| 31 March 2018 | Wuhan | China | Optics Valley International Tennis Center | 20,000 | — |
| 20 April 2018 | Shenzhen | China | Shenzhen Bay Sports Center Gymnasium | — | — |
| 21 April 2018 | Shenzhen | China | Shenzhen Bay Sports Center Gymnasium | — | — |
| 5 May 2018 | Dalian | China | Dalian Sports Centre Gymnasium | — | — |
| 19 May 2018 | Beijing | China | Wukesong Arena | — | — |
| 20 May 2018 | Beijing | China | Wukesong Arena | — | — |
| 2 June 2018 | Nanjing | China | Nanjing Olympic Sports Center Gymnasium | — | — |
| 3 June 2018 | Nanjing | China | Nanjing Olympic Sports Center Gymnasium | — | — |
| 16 June 2018 | Jinan | China | Jinan Olympic Sports Center Gymnasium | — | — |
| 30 June 2018 | Nanning | China | Guangxi Sports Center Gymnasium | — | — |
| 14 July 2018 | Changsha | China | Hunan Int'l Conference & Exhibition Center | — | — |
| 21 July 2018 | Chengdu | China | Wuliangye Chengdu Performing Arts Centre | — | — |
| 28 July 2018 | Chongqing | China | Chongqing International Expo Center | — | — |
| 4 August 2018 | Tianjin | China | Tianjin Arena | — | — |
| 5 August 2018 | Tianjin | China | Tianjin Arena | — | — |
| 11 August 2018 | Wuxi | China | Wuxi Sports Center Gymnasium | — | — |
| 15 August 2018 | Singapore | | Singapore Indoor Stadium | 32,000 | — |
| 16 August 2018 | Singapore | | Singapore Indoor Stadium | 32,000 | — |
| 18 August 2018 | Singapore | | Singapore Indoor Stadium | 32,000 | — |
| 19 August 2018 | Singapore | | Singapore Indoor Stadium | 32,000 | — |
| 7 September 2018 | Kuala Lumpur | Malaysia | Axiata Arena | — | — |
| 8 September 2018 | Kuala Lumpur | Malaysia | Axiata Arena | — | — |
| 15 September 2018 | Dongguan | China | Dongguan Sports Center Gymnasium | — | — |
| 23 September 2018 | Hong Kong | China | Hong Kong Coliseum | — | — |
| 24 September 2018 | Hong Kong | China | Hong Kong Coliseum | — | — |
| 25 September 2018 | Hong Kong | China | Hong Kong Coliseum | — | — |
| 30 September 2018 | Shaoxing | China | Shaoxing Olympic Sports Centre Gymnasium | — | — |
| 14 February 2019 | Taipei | Taiwan | Taipei Arena | — | — |
| 15 February 2019 | Taipei | Taiwan | Taipei Arena | — | — |
| 16 February 2019 | Taipei | Taiwan | Taipei Arena | — | — |
| 17 February 2019 | Taipei | Taiwan | Taipei Arena | — | — |
| 9 March 2019 | Sydney | Australia | Qudos Bank Arena | 11,528 / 11,740 | $2,233,420 |
| 11 March 2019 | Melbourne | Australia | Rod Laver Arena | 10,874 / 11,278 | $1,719,320 |

Sanctuary 2.0 World Tour dates
| Date | City | Country | Venue | Attendance | Revenue |
|---|---|---|---|---|---|
| 23 March 2019 | Hangzhou | China | Huanglong Stadium | — | — |
| 30 March 2019 | Huangshi | China | Huangshi Olympic Sports Center Stadium | 30,000 | — |
| 6 April 2019 | Suzhou | China | Suzhou Sports Center Stadium | — | — |
| 13 April 2019 | Zhengzhou | China | Henan Provincial Sports Center Stadium | — | — |
| 20 April 2019 | Xiamen | China | Xiamen Sports Centre Stadium | — | — |
| 27 April 2019 | Shijiazhuang | China | Yutong International Sports Center | — | — |
| 11 May 2019 | Shenyang | China | Shenyang Olympic Sports Center Stadium | — | — |
| 18 May 2019 | Foshan | China | Century Lotus Stadium | — | — |
| 25 May 2019 | Qingdao | China | Conson Stadium | — | — |
| 15 June 2019 | Hefei | China | Hefei Olympic Sports Center Stadium | — | — |
| 22 June 2019 | Changsha | China | Helong Sports Center Stadium | — | — |
| 29 June 2019 | Harbin | China | HICEC Stadium | — | — |
| 6 July 2019 | Nanchang | China | Nanchang International Sports Center Stadium | — | — |
| 12 July 2019 | Changchun | China | Development Area Stadium | — | — |
| 27 July 2019 | Xiangyang | China | Xiangyang Stadium | — | — |
| 3 August 2019 | Changzhou | China | Changzhou Olympic Sports Centre Stadium | — | — |
| 10 August 2019 | Zhuhai | China | Zhuhai Sports Center Stadium | — | — |
| 17 August 2019 | Jinhua | China | Jinhua Stadium | — | — |
| 24 August 2019 | Guiyang | China | Guiyang Olympic Sports Center Stadium | — | — |
| 31 August 2019 | Quanzhou | China | Quanzhou Strait Sports Center Stadium | — | — |
| 5 October 2019 | Tianjin | China | Tianjin Olympic Center Stadium | — | — |
| 26 October 2019 | Zhenjiang | China | Zhenjiang Sports Centre Stadium | — | — |
| 2 November 2019 | Chongqing | China | Chongqing Olympic Sports Center Stadium | — | — |
| 9 November 2019 | Jinan | China | Shandong Provincial Stadium | — | — |
| 16 November 2019 | Chengdu | China | Shuangliu Sports Centre Stadium | — | — |
| 30 November 2019 | Zhanjiang | China | Zhanjiang Olympic Center Stadium | — | — |
| 7 December 2019 | Kuala Lumpur | Malaysia | Bukit Jalil National Stadium | — | — |
| 14 December 2019 | Fuzhou | China | Cross-Straits Olympic Sports Centre Stadium | — | — |
| 21 December 2019 | Singapore | | Singapore National Stadium | 80,000 | — |
| 22 December 2019 | Singapore | | Singapore National Stadium | 80,000 | — |
| Total | | | | 1,600,000 | N/A |

=== Cancelled shows ===
| Date | City | Country | Venue | Reason |
|---|---|---|---|---|
| 7 March 2020 | Sydney | Australia | Stadium Australia | COVID-19 pandemic |
| 27 March 2020 | Shanghai | China | Hongkou Football Stadium | COVID-19 pandemic |
| 28 March 2020 | Shanghai | China | Hongkou Football Stadium | COVID-19 pandemic |
| 29 March 2020 | Shanghai | China | Hongkou Football Stadium | COVID-19 pandemic |
| 25 April 2020 | Nanning | China | Guangxi Sports Center Stadium | COVID-19 pandemic |
| 26 April 2020 | Nanning | China | Guangxi Sports Center Stadium | COVID-19 pandemic |
| 9 May 2020 | Guangzhou | China | Guangzhou Higher Education Mega Center Central Stadium | COVID-19 pandemic |
| 10 May 2020 | Guangzhou | China | Guangzhou Higher Education Mega Center Central Stadium | COVID-19 pandemic |
| 23 May 2020 | Xianyang | China | Xianyang Stadium | COVID-19 pandemic |
| 24 May 2020 | Xianyang | China | Xianyang Stadium | COVID-19 pandemic |
| 30 May 2020 | Nanjing | China | Nanjing Olympic Sports Centre Stadium | COVID-19 pandemic |
| 31 May 2020 | Nanjing | China | Nanjing Olympic Sports Centre Stadium | COVID-19 pandemic |
