= Westside (album) =

Studio album by JJ Lin
- Released: 29 June 2007
- Recorded: 2007
- Genre: Mandopop
- Length: 46:02
- Language: Mandarin
- Label: Ocean Butterflies

JJ Lin chronology
Just JJ World Tour 2006 (2006)	Westside (2007)	Sixology (2008)

Singles from Westside
- 1. "Westside" Released: 26 June 2007; 2. "The Killa" Released: 29 June 2007

Westside (Chinese: 西界) is the fifth studio album by Singaporean singer JJ Lin, released on 29 June 2007 by Ocean Butterflies.

== Track listing ==
All music is composed by JJ Lin.

Westside – Standard edition
No.	Title	Lyrics	Length
1.	"獨白" (Confession)		1:34
2.	"殺手" (The Killa)	Eric Lin (林秋離)	4:54
3.	"殺手@續" (The Awakening)		1:17
4.	"西界" (Westside)	Eric Lin (林秋離)	4:55
5.	"無聊" (J-Fusion)	Eric Lin (林秋離)	3:49
6.	"單挑" (Let's Battle!)	JJ Lin	0:49
7.	"K.O"	Eric Lin (林秋離), Lin Ziqin (林子欽)	4:03
8.	"大男人小女孩" (Boyfriend Girlfriend)	JJ Lin	3:49
9.	"L-O-V-E"	Yvonne Lin (林怡鳳)	4:10
10.	"Love in the Air" (發現愛)	Yvonne Lin (林怡鳳)	3:43
11.	"不流淚的機場" (Flying on your Wings)	Ven Chen (陳嘉文)	4:48
12.	"Baby Baby"	Eric Lin (林秋離), Rynn Lim (林宇中)	3:41
13.	"自由不變" (Freedom)	Eric Lin (林秋離)	4:30
Total length:			46:02

Westside – Hong Kong edition (bonus track)
No.	Title	Lyrics	Length
1.	"江南(粵語版)" (River South (Cantonese Version))	Keith Chan Siu-kei (陳少琪)	4:28

== Charts ==
=== Weekly charts ===
Chart (2007)	Peak position
Taiwanese Albums (G-Music)	2

== Sales ==
Region	Certification	Certified units/sales
Asia	—	1,600,000
