= Just JJ World Tour 2006 =

Live album by JJ Lin
- Released: 29 December 2006
- Genre: Mandopop
- Label: Ocean Butterflies

JJ Lin chronology
Cao Cao (2006)	Just JJ World Tour 2006 (2006)	Westside (2007)

Just JJ World Tour 2006 is the first live album by Singaporean singer JJ Lin, released on 29 December 2006 by Ocean Butterflies.

== Track listing ==
1. 演唱会前传：忘记
2. 木乃伊
3. 开场白
4. 翅膀
5. 善与恶
6. 明天
7. 就是我
8. 被风吹过的夏天
9. 爱笑的眼睛
10. I Do
11. 记得
12. 听不懂没关系
13. 熟能生巧
14. 决战时刻
15. 第二天堂
16. 子弹列车
17. 进化论
18. 一千年以后
19. Encore
20. 只对你说
21. 英雄再现
22. 江南
23. 幕后英雄策
