= Hundred Days (album) =

Studio album by JJ Lin
- Released: 18 December 2009
- Recorded: 2009
- Genre: Mandopop
- Length: 50:13
- Language: Mandarin
- Label: Ocean Butterflies

JJ Lin chronology
Sixology (2008)	Hundred Days (2009)	She Says (2010)

Singles from She Says
- 1. "Hundred Days" Released: 2 December 2009; 2. "Back to Back" Released: 18 December 2009; 3. "Go!" Released: 18 December 2009

Hundred Days (Chinese: 100天) is the seventh studio album by Singaporean singer JJ Lin, released on 18 December 2009 by Ocean Butterflies.

== Singles ==
The titular single "Hundred Days" premiered on radio stations on 2 December 2009. The single "Back to Back" is listed at number 17 on the 2010 Hit FM Top 100 Singles of the Year chart.

== Track listing ==
All music is composed by JJ Lin.

No.	Title	Lyrics	Length
1.	"X"	Eric Lin （林秋離）, MC Vader	4:06
2.	"第幾個100天" (Hundred Days)	Daryl Yao （姚若龍）	4:34
3.	"加油！ feat. MC HotDog" (Go!)	JJ Lin, MC HotDog （姚中仁）	3:46
4.	"曙光" (Twilight)		0:46
5.	"無法克制" (Obsession)	Daryl Yao （姚若龍）	4:12
6.	"背對背擁抱" (Back to Back)	Yvonne Lin （林怡鳳）	3:55
7.	"跟屁蟲" (Copycat)	Dr.Moon （林子欽）	3:46
8.	"一個又一個" (One By One)	Rynn Lim （林宇中）	4:24
9.	"愛不會絕跡" (Love Chronicles)	Tina Wang （王雅君）	4:00
10.	"轉動" (The One)	Kate Liao （廖瑩如）, Mr. Mars （許環良）	4:49
11.	"媽媽的娜魯娃" (Naruwan)	Eeva Chang （張美香）, Mr. Mars （許環良）	3:58
12.	"Still Moving Under Gunfire"	JJ Lin	4:07
13.	"表達愛 feat. Liao Jun" (Show Your Love)	Yvonne Lin （林怡鳳）, Venus （許環良）, Lin Wei Li （林蔚利）	3:50
Total length:			50:13

== Charts ==
Chart (2009)	Peak position
Taiwanese Albums (G-Music)	2
