= She Says =

She Says may refer to:

- "She Says" (Howie Day song), 2005
- "She Says" (Unwritten Law song), 2005
- She Says (album), a 2011 album by JJ Lin
