= 29th Golden Melody Awards =

Taiwanese music awards ceremony in 2018

- Date: 23 June 2018 (Popular music)
- Location: Taipei Arena, Taiwan (Popular music)
- Hosted by: Jam Hsiao (Popular music)

Television/radio coverage
- Network: TTV

The 29th Golden Melody Awards (Chinese: 第29屆金曲獎) took place in Taipei, Taiwan in 2018. The award ceremony for the popular music categories was hosted by Jam Hsiao and broadcast on TTV on 23 June.

== Winners and nominees ==
Below is the list of winners and nominees for the popular music categories.

Vocal category – Record label awards
Album of the Year	Song of the Year
C'mon In~ – Eason Chan; When I Leave Taipei – Leon Zheng; The Inner Me – Lala Hsu; Story Thief – A-Mei; Message in a Bottle – JJ Lin; The Journal – Dean Ting; Cartoon Character – EggPlantEgg; Mend the Dreams – Henry Hsu; Shaking the Mountains and Rivers – Chen Ming-chang; Kin – Chiang Yu-ta; Cheers – Hsiao Huang-chi; Da Ling Jiao Xia 2 – Qiu Lin; Dim Night – Huang Wei-jie; The Dirt Road – Ayugo Huang; Hakka Girl 2017 – Caleb Hsiao; Sitting Together – Paliulius; Infection – Seredau; Naomi – CMO Group; With You – Siva9 Band	"He-R" (from He-R) – Crowd Lu; "To Have, or Not to Have" (from The Great Buddha + Soundtrack) – Lin Sheng Xiang; "Southbound Night Bus" (from Begin the Second Half) – Fire EX.; "Guan Yin Shan" (from Home III) – Lo Ta-yu; "Little Big Us" (from Message in a Bottle) – JJ Lin
Best Mandarin Album	Best Taiwanese Album
The Inner Me – Lala Hsu; When I Leave Taipei – Leon Zheng; C'mon In~ – Eason Chan; Story Thief – A-Mei; Message in a Bottle – JJ Lin; The Journal – Dean Ting	Cartoon Character – EggPlantEgg; Mend the Dreams – Henry Hsu; Shaking the Mountains and Rivers – Chen Ming-chang; Kin – Chiang Yu-ta; Cheers – Hsiao Huang-chi
Best Hakka Album	Best Aboriginal Album
The Dirt Road – Ayugo Huang; Da Ling Jiao Xia 2 – Qiu Lin; Dim Night – Huang Wei-jie; Hakka Girl 2017 – Caleb Hsiao	Naomi – CMO Group; Sitting Together – Paliulius; Infection – Seredau; With You – Siva9 Band
Best Music Video	
"Left Behind" (from Story Thief) – Director: Lo Ging-zim; "He's a Space Deris from the Doomsday Prophecy" (from Martial God Cardea) – Director: Tan Tsung-fan; "Thai Cha Cha" (from All Eat Asia) – Director: Chayanop Boonprakob; "The Prayer" (from The Inner Me) – Director: Bill Chia; "Waves" (from Insignificant Secret) – Director: Birdy; "Pseudo-Single, Yet Single" (from A-Lin) – Director: Leo Liao and Yao Kuo-chen; "Yuki Onna" (from Run! Frantic Flowers!) – Director: Mo (Yamanyamo)	
Vocal category – Individual awards
Best Composition	Best Lyrics
"He-R" (from He-R) – Crowd Lu (Performer: Crowd Lu); "No No" (from Martial God Cardea) – Sandee Chan and Waa Wei (Performer: Sandee Chan and Waa Wei); "The Prayer" (from The Inner Me) – Eve Ai (Performer: Lala Hsu); "Hometown" (from Still an Outlander) – Li Jianqing (Performer: Li Jianqing); "Little Big Us" (from Message in a Bottle) – JJ Lin (Performer: JJ Lin)	"Guo Yuan Chao" (from Guo Yuan Chao) – Song Dongye (Performer: Song Dongye); "To Have, or Not to Have" (from The Great Buddha + Soundtrack) – Wang Chao-hua (Performer: Lin Sheng-xiang); "He-R" (from He-R) – Crowd Lu (Performer: Crowd Lu); "Hometown" (from Still an Outlander) – Yan Bin and Jonathan Lee (Performer: Li Jianqing); "Full Name" (from Story Thief) – David Ke (Performer: A-Mei)
Best Music Arrangement	Producer of the Year Album
"Grim Reaper" (from I Have Myself) – Wen Yi-zhe (Performer: Janice Yan); "With You" (from With You) – Huang Shao-yong (Performer: Xiao Yu); "A Dancing Van Gogh" (from No. 13 – A Dancing Van Gogh) – Kenn C (Performer: Stefanie Sun); "Wake" (from C'mon In~) – Jerald Chan (Performer: Eason Chan); "Piao Bai" (from Tomorrow Never Ends) – Chang Shilei (Performer: Isabelle Huang)	Still an Outlander – Jonathan Lee (Performer: Li Jianqing); Hors du commun – Penny Tai (Performer: Koala Liu); C'mon In~ – Jerald Chan (Performer: Eason Chan); Message in a Bottle – JJ Lin (Performer: JJ Lin)
Producer of the Year Single	Best Male Mandarin Singer
"To Have, or Not to Have" (from The Great Buddha + Soundtrack) – Lin Sheng-xiang (Performer: Lin Sheng-xiang); "Southbound Night Bus" (from Begin the Second Half) – Fire EX. (Performer: Fire EX.); "He-R" (from He-R) – Crowd Lu (Performer: Crowd Lu); "A Dancing Van Gogh" (from No. 13 – A Dancing Van Gogh) – Kenn C, Stefanie Sun (Performer: Stefanie Sun); "Mybong" (from Longhumen) – Poetek (Performer: Poetek, Julia Wu)	C'mon In~ – Eason Chan; With You – Xiao Yu; Will You Remember – Nicky Lee; Message in a Bottle – JJ Lin; How – Haor
Best Female Mandarin Singer	Best Male Taiwanese Singer
The Inner Me – Lala Hsu; O_Love – Amuyi; Little Outerspace – Faye; Story Thief – A-Mei; When I Look Back – Julia Peng	Cheers – Hsiao Huang-chi; I Do Your Patrons – Weng Li-you; The Phonograph of Life, Drama Soundtracks Collection 2 – Ric Jan; Mend the Dreams – Henry Hsu; Still Loving You – Tsai Chia-lin
Best Female Taiwanese Singer	Best Hakka Singer
Elly Love You – Elly Chang; Bo Li Xin – Lin Chiao-an; Deng Tian Guang – Angel Chu; Look Up – Hanya Chang; True Happiness Indeed – Gigi Wu	Da Ling Jiao Xia 2 – Qiu Lin; Dim Night – Huang Wei-jie; The Dirt Road – Ayugo Huang; Hakka Girl 2017 – Caleb Hsiao
Best Aboriginal Singer	Best Band
Infection – Seredau; Sitting Together – Paliulius; La mathuaw maqitan apiakuzan – Magaitan Lhkatafat	The Offering – The Chairman; Begin the Second Half – Fire EX.; Dear – Sweet John; Cartoon Character – EggPlantEgg; Be Well World – LEO37+SOSS; I'm Not a Superman – Mr. Loud Who Chance
Best Vocal Group	Best New Artist
Big Thing – MJ116; OwO – Yeemao; Loneliness, Sadness and a Thank You – Astro Bunny; In Search of Happiness – Crispy; Chang and Lee – Chang and Lee	Cartoon Character – EggPlantEgg; When I Leave Taipei – Leon Zheng; J.Sheon – J.Sheon; Stay Sober – Jerry Li; I Have Myself – Janice Yan; We Are All Lonely Souls – Paige Su; The Journal – Dean Ting
Special Contribution Award
Su Rui Joy Kuo
Jury Award
–
