= No. 89757 =

Studio album by JJ Lin
- Released: 1 April 2005
- Genre: Mandopop
- Length: 41:23
- Language: Mandarin
- Label: Ocean Butterflies

JJ Lin chronology
| Haven (2004) | No. 89757 (2005) | Cao Cao (2006) |

No. 89757 (simplified Chinese: 编号89757; traditional Chinese: 編號89757) is the third studio album by Singaporean singer JJ Lin, released on 1 April 2005 by Ocean Butterflies.

== Track listing ==
All music is composed by JJ Lin.

No. 89757 – Standard edition
| No. | Title | Lyrics | Length |
|---|---|---|---|
| 1. | "一千年以前" (A Thousand Years Before...) | | 1:04 |
| 2. | "木乃伊" (The Mummy) | Eric Lin (林秋離), Jian Sheng (簡勝) | 4:15 |
| 3. | "編號89757" (No. 89757) | Eric Lin (林秋離), Teoh Sze'er (張思爾) | 4:07 |
| 4. | "莎士比亞的天份" (Shakespeare's Talent) | JJ Lin | 4:11 |
| 5. | "突然累了" (Down Lately) | Eric Lin (林秋離) | 4:08 |
| 6. | "明天" (Tomorrow) | Eric Lin (李瑞洵) | 4:03 |
| 7. | "簡簡單單" (Simply) | Xiang Yue'e (向月娥), Teoh Sze'er (張思爾) | 3:30 |
| 8. | "無盡的思念" (I Miss You) | Devon Song(宋建彰) | 3:42 |
| 9. | "盜" (Steal) | Eric Lin (林秋離), Teoh Sze'er (張思爾) | 4:07 |
| 10. | "聽不懂 沒關係" (Gibberish) | AMY, JJ Lin | 3:56 |
| 11. | "來不及了" (We're Out Of Time) | | 0:32 |
| 12. | "一千年以後" (A Thousand Years Later) | Eric Lin (李瑞洵) | 3:48 |
| Total length: | | | 41:23 |

No. 89757 – Singapore, Malaysia, and China pre-order edition (bonus track)
| No. | Title | Lyrics | Length |
|---|---|---|---|
| 1. | "被風吹過的夏天 feat. Kym" (Summer Breeze) | Juliet Pang (馮欣慧) | 4:19 |

== Charts ==
| Chart (2005) | Peak position |
|---|---|
| Singaporean Albums (RIAS) | 1 |
