= Sixology =

Studio album by JJ Lin
- Released: 18 October 2008
- Recorded: 2008
- Genre: Mandopop
- Length: 51:32
- Language: Mandarin
- Label: Ocean Butterflies

JJ Lin chronology
Westside (2007)	Sixology (2008)	Hundred Days (2009)

Singles from Sixology
- 1. "Dimples" Released: 29 September 2008; 2. "Tales of the Red Cliff" Released: 18 October 2008; 3. "I Still Miss Her" Released: 18 October 2008

Sixology (simplified Chinese: JJ陆; traditional Chinese: JJ陸) is the sixth studio album by Singaporean singer JJ Lin. It was released on 18 October 2008 by Ocean Butterflies.

== Songs ==
The album features a duet and music video, "Dimples" features Charlene Choi which also released in her debut studio album Lonely Me. The song was released as the album's lead single on 29 September 2008, premiering on radio stations in Singapore, China, Taiwan, Malaysia, and Hong Kong. In addition, the Singaporean, Malaysian, and Hong Kong versions of the album include a Cantonese version of "Dimples".

== Accolades ==
The album won for an IFPI Hong Kong Top Sales Music Award for Top 10 Best Selling Mandarin Album of the Year.

== Track listing ==
All music is composed by JJ Lin.

Sixology – Standard edition
No.	Title	Lyrics	Length
1.	"Sixology"	JJ Lin	0:41
2.	"不潮不用花錢" (High Fashion)	Yvonne Lin (林怡鳳)	3:54
3.	"小酒窩 featuring Charlene Choi" (Dimples)	Tina Wang (王雅君)	3:38
4.	"黑武士" (Lord Vader)	Ashin (五月天阿信)	3:40
5.	"醉赤壁" (Tales of the Red Cliff)	Vincent Fang (方文山)	4:42
6.	"由你選擇" (The Choice is Yours)	FAMA (農夫)	3:53
7.	"Always Online"	Yvonne Lin (林怡鳳)	3:45
8.	"街道" (The Streets)	Dr. Moon (林子欽), Mr. Mars (許環良)	4:02
9.	"主角" (Centerstage)	Jeffrey Huang (黄立成), Luke Tsui (崔惟楷), DonP (洪健钧), Suffa (费聿锋), Mr. Mars (許環良)	3:32
10.	"我還想她" (I Still Miss Her)	Heng Cheng Hwa (邢增華)	4:08
11.	"點一把火炬" (Light The Torch)	Mr. Mars (許環良), Heng Cheng Hwa (邢增華)	4:14
12.	"期待愛 feat. Kym" (Longing)	Mr. Mars (許環良), Yvonne Lin (林怡鳳)	3:54
13.	"Cries in a Distance"	JJ Lin	3:45
14.	"愛與希望" (Love and Hope)	Tina Wang (王雅君)	3:44
Total length:			51:32

Sixology – Hong Kong, Singapore, and Malaysia edition (bonus track)
No.	Title	Lyrics	Length
1.	"小酒窩 (粵語) featuring Charlene Choi" (Dimples (Cantonese))	Keith Chan (陳少琪)	3:38

== Charts ==
=== Weekly charts ===
Chart (2008)	Peak position
Taiwanese Albums (G-Music)	5

== Sales ==
Region	Certification	Certified units/sales
Asia	—	1,000,000
