= Cao Cao (disambiguation) =

Cao Cao (155–220) was a Chinese warlord of the late Eastern Han dynasty who laid the foundation for the state of Cao Wei in the Three Kingdoms period.

Cao Cao may also refer to:

- Cao Cao (album), album by singer JJ Lin
- Cao Cao (TV series), a 2013 Chinese TV series
- Cao Cao (actor) (born 1973), Jonathan Kos-Read, American actor in film and television in China

Caocao:

- Caocao Chuxing, a ride-hailing service owned by Geely
