= Music Voyager =

Studio album by JJ Lin
- Released: 10 April 2003
- Genre: Mandopop
- Length: 41:16
- Language: Mandarin
- Label: Ocean Butterflies

JJ Lin chronology
Music Voyager (2003)	Haven (2004)

Music Voyager (simplified Chinese: 乐行者; traditional Chinese: 樂行者) is the debut studio album by Singaporean singer JJ Lin, released on 10 April 2003 by Ocean Butterflies.

== Track listing ==
All music is composed by JJ Lin

No.	Title	Lyrics	Length
1.	"就是我" (I'm The One)	Teoh Sze'er （張思爾）	3:14
2.	"會讀書" (Books)	Teoh Sze'er （張思爾）	3:29
3.	"翅膀" (Wings)	Teoh Sze'er （張思爾）	3:42
4.	"星球" (Planet)	Teoh Sze'er （張思爾）	3:46
5.	"凍結" (Freeze)	Teoh Sze'er （張思爾）	4:47
6.	"壓力" (Pressure)	Teoh Sze'er （張思爾）	3:11
7.	"女兒家" (The Girls)	Teoh Sze'er （張思爾）	3:10
8.	"星空下的吻" (Heaven's Kiss)	Teoh Sze'er （張思爾）, Eric Lin （林秋離）	3:44
9.	"讓我心動的人" (My Beloved)	Teoh Sze'er （張思爾）	3:33
10.	"會有那麼一天" (Someday)	Teoh Sze'er （張思爾）	4:08
11.	"不懂" (I Don't Know)	Teoh Sze'er （張思爾）	4:32
Total length:			41:16
