= JJ20 World Tour =

2022–2025 concert tour by JJ Lin

- World tour by JJ Lin
- Location: Asia; North America; Europe; Oceania
- Associated album: Various
- Start date: 4 November 2022
- End date: 13 July 2025
- Legs: 2
- No. of shows: 104
- Attendance: 2,600,000 (77 shows)

JJ Lin concert chronology
- Sanctuary World Tour (2018–19); JJ20 World Tour (2022–25)

The JJ20 World Tour was the sixth concert tour by Singaporean singer-songwriter JJ Lin. It spans over 77 dates in Asia, North America, Europe and Australia. The tour began on 4 November 2022, at the Singapore National Stadium, and concluded on 3 November 2024, at the Chongqing Olympic Sports Center Stadium. An extension of the tour, titled JJ20 Final Lap, began in Singapore on 28 December 2024 and ended on 13 July 2025 at Beijing National Stadium.

The first leg of the JJ20 World Tour attracted 2.6 million attendees across 77 shows.

== Commercial performance ==
On 28 April 2023, Pollstar released the Top 20 Global Concert Tours report based on the data reported in the past three months. JJ Lin was the only Asian singer on the list, ranking fifth with an average of US$2,767,000 in revenue and 10,108 people per show. On 30 November, Billboard included 12 of JJ Lin's performances in Europe and the United States in their Year in Touring 2023 report, ranking 90th on the overall list with a box office revenue of US$29.1 million.

== Concert records ==
- The first Mandopop singer to hold a concert in Seattle (11 February 2023)
- The first Mandopop singer to perform 2 consecutive shows at the Barclays Center in New York (17–18 February 2023)
- The first Mandopop singer to perform 2 consecutive shows at the Coca-Cola Coliseum in Toronto (23–24 February 2023)
- The first Mandopop singer to perform 3 consecutive shows at Wembley Arena in London (30 April – 2 May 2023)
- The first singer to perform 2 consecutive shows at the Xianyang Olympic Sports Center Stadium (28–29 October 2023)
- The first singer to play 2 consecutive shows at the Guangxi Sports Center Stadium in Nanning (9–10 December 2023)
- The first singer to play 2 consecutive shows at the Hangzhou Olympic Sports Center Stadium (16–17 March 2024)
- The first singer to play 2 consecutive shows at the Harbin International Convention Exhibition and Sports Center Stadium (23–24 June 2024)
- The first Mandopop singer to hold a concert at the Indonesia Arena in Jakarta (24 August 2024)

== Set list ==
Set list of JJ20 World Tour on 4 November 2022 in Singapore

Vcr 1 Memory

1. Remember
2. The Mummy
3. Mermaid
4. Raindrops
5. Tales of the Red Cliff
6. The Key

Vcr 2 Dream

7. Perfect Match
8. Dimples
9. When You
10. Those Were The Days (JJ20 Edition)
11. You N Me

Vcr 3 UniverseⅠ

12. Brave New World
13. Bullet Train
14. Wonderland ＋ While I Can
15. Nonexistent
16. 53 Dawns
17. I Miss You
18. No Turning Back
19. Lose Control
20. Like You Do
21. Eternal Life

Vcr 4 UniverseⅡ

22. Elven Beauty
23. I Still Miss Her
24. So Be It
25. Westside

Vcr 5 Complete

26. Bedroom
27. Love U U
28. Smiling Eyes
29. If Only
30. Dear Stranger (feat. Patti Tsai)
31. Drifter
32. Practice Love
33. The Story Of Us
34. River South
35. Twilight

Vcr 6 Journey

36. JJ20
37. High Fashion
38. Embark
39. The Show
40. We Will
41. A Thousand Years Later
Set list of JJ20 Final Lap World Tour on 28 December 2024 in Singapore

Vcr 1 The Timekeeper

1. A Thousand Years Later
2. Brave New World
3. No.89757
4. Wonderland
5. Freeze

Vcr 2 The Romantic

6. Wall
7. Always Online
8. The Romantic

Vcr 3 The Boy

9. Dimples
10. A Song for You Till the End of Time
11. Self Portrait
12. Simply

Vcr 4 The Broken

13. The Lost Ones
14. Romantic Mystery
15. Like You Do

Vcr 5 The Darkness

16. The Killa
17. Cyber Ritual (feat. Jasmine Sokko)
18. Burnout Dynasty (Jasmine Sokko)
19. All in Your Mind
20. Not Tonight

Vcr 6 The Fighter

21. Unchained
22. Shut Up
23. Sanctuary
24. Tale Of The Red Cliff
25. Love Chronicles
26. Cao cao

Vcr 7 The Healer

27. Remember
28. She Says
29. Someday
30. Love U U
31. Light of Sanctuary
32. Smiling Eyes
33. If Only
34. Back To Back
35. Practice Love
36. You N Me
37. JJ20
38. High Fashion
39. River South

Vcr 8 The Turn of a Page

40. Twilight
41. Above The Fray
42. No Turning Back

== Concert dates ==
List of JJ20 World Tour dates
Date	City	Country	Venue	Attendance
4 November 2022	Singapore		Singapore National Stadium	60,000
5 November 2022	Singapore		Singapore National Stadium	60,000
3 December 2022	Taoyuan (Note: Billed as Taipei.)	Taiwan	Rakuten Taoyuan Baseball Stadium	50,000
4 December 2022	Taoyuan	Taiwan	Rakuten Taoyuan Baseball Stadium	50,000
18 December 2022	Kuala Lumpur	Malaysia	Bukit Jalil National Stadium	30,000
28 January 2023	Las Vegas	United States	MGM Grand Garden Arena	16,199
29 January 2023	Las Vegas	United States	MGM Grand Garden Arena	16,199
5 February 2023	Uncasville (Note: Billed as Connecticut.)	United States	Mohegan Sun Arena	5,800
7 February 2023	San Jose	United States	SAP Center	10,767
11 February 2023	Seattle	United States	Climate Pledge Arena	11,403
17 February 2023	New York City	United States	Barclays Center	24,889
18 February 2023	New York City	United States	Barclays Center	24,889
23 February 2023	Toronto	Canada	Coca-Cola Coliseum	13,066
24 February 2023	Toronto	Canada	Coca-Cola Coliseum	13,066
17 March 2023	Hong Kong		Central Harbourfront Event Space	120,000
18 March 2023	Hong Kong		Central Harbourfront Event Space	120,000
19 March 2023	Hong Kong		Central Harbourfront Event Space	120,000
24 March 2023	Hong Kong		Central Harbourfront Event Space	120,000
25 March 2023	Hong Kong		Central Harbourfront Event Space	120,000
26 March 2023	Hong Kong		Central Harbourfront Event Space	120,000
8 April 2023	Melbourne	Australia	Rod Laver Arena	10,535
15 April 2023	Sydney	Australia	Qudos Bank Arena	11,806
25 April 2023	Paris	France	AccorHotels Arena	12,344
30 April 2023	London	England	Wembley Arena	20,833
1 May 2023	London	England	Wembley Arena	20,833
2 May 2023	London	England	Wembley Arena	20,833
19 August 2023	Shanghai	China	Hongkou Football Stadium	60,000
20 August 2023	Shanghai	China	Hongkou Football Stadium	60,000
8 September 2023	Guangzhou	China	Tianhe Stadium	80,000
10 September 2023	Guangzhou	China	Tianhe Stadium	80,000
22 September 2023	Beijing	China	Beijing National Stadium	180,000
23 September 2023	Beijing	China	Beijing National Stadium	180,000
24 September 2023	Beijing	China	Beijing National Stadium	180,000
28 October 2023	Xianyang	China	Xianyang Olympic Sports Center Stadium	80,000
29 October 2023	Xianyang	China	Xianyang Olympic Sports Center Stadium	80,000
11 November 2023	Nanjing	China	Nanjing Olympic Sports Center Stadium	70,000
12 November 2023	Nanjing	China	Nanjing Olympic Sports Center Stadium	70,000
25 November 2023	Wuhan	China	Wuhan Five Rings Sports Center Stadium	70,000
26 November 2023	Wuhan	China	Wuhan Five Rings Sports Center Stadium	70,000
9 December 2023	Nanning	China	Guangxi Sports Center Stadium	80,000
10 December 2023	Nanning	China	Guangxi Sports Center Stadium	80,000
9 March 2024	Chengdu	China	Dong'an Lake Sports Park Stadium	80,000
10 March 2024	Chengdu	China	Dong'an Lake Sports Park Stadium	80,000
16 March 2024	Hangzhou	China	Hangzhou Olympic Sports Center Stadium	120,000
17 March 2024	Hangzhou	China	Hangzhou Olympic Sports Center Stadium	120,000
30 March 2024	Fuzhou	China	Haixia Olympic Center Stadium	90,000
31 March 2024	Fuzhou	China	Haixia Olympic Center Stadium	90,000
13 April 2024	Tianjin	China	Tianjin Olympic Sports Center Stadium	100,000
14 April 2024	Tianjin	China	Tianjin Olympic Sports Center Stadium	100,000
4 May 2024	Shenzhen	China	Shenzhen Universiade Center Stadium	100,000
5 May 2024	Shenzhen	China	Shenzhen Universiade Center Stadium	100,000
11 May 2024	Jinan	China	Jinan Olympic Sports Center Stadium	100,000
12 May 2024	Jinan	China	Jinan Olympic Sports Center Stadium	100,000
25 May 2024	Suzhou	China	Suzhou Olympic Sports Center Stadium	80,000
26 May 2024	Suzhou	China	Suzhou Olympic Sports Center Stadium	80,000
1 June 2024	Nanchang	China	Nanchang International Sports Center Stadium	100,000
2 June 2024	Nanchang	China	Nanchang International Sports Center Stadium	100,000
15 June 2024	Guiyang	China	Guiyang Olympic Sports Center	90,000
16 June 2024	Guiyang	China	Guiyang Olympic Sports Center	90,000
23 June 2024	Harbin	China	HICEC Stadium	80,000
24 June 2024	Harbin	China	HICEC Stadium	80,000
6 July 2024	Lanzhou	China	Lanzhou Olympic Sports Center Rose Stadium	80,000
7 July 2024	Lanzhou	China	Lanzhou Olympic Sports Center Rose Stadium	80,000
3 August 2024	Zhengzhou	China	Zhengzhou Olympic Sports Center Stadium	80,000
4 August 2024	Zhengzhou	China	Zhengzhou Olympic Sports Center Stadium	80,000
24 August 2024	Jakarta	Indonesia	Indonesia Arena	8,000
31 August 2024	Taiyuan	China	Shanxi Sports Centre Stadium	100,000
1 September 2024	Taiyuan	China	Shanxi Sports Centre Stadium	100,000
21 September 2024	Qingdao	China	Qingdao Citizen Fitness Center Stadium	—
22 September 2024	Qingdao	China	Qingdao Citizen Fitness Center Stadium	—
2 October 2024	Yokohama (Note: Billed as Tokyo.)	Japan	K-Arena Yokohama	—
5 October 2024	Bangkok	Thailand	Impact Arena	—
19 October 2024	Xiamen	China	Xiamen Egret Stadium	100,000
20 October 2024	Xiamen	China	Xiamen Egret Stadium	100,000
1 November 2024	Chongqing	China	Chongqing Olympic Sports Center Stadium	120,000
2 November 2024	Chongqing	China	Chongqing Olympic Sports Center Stadium	120,000
3 November 2024	Chongqing	China	Chongqing Olympic Sports Center Stadium	120,000

List of JJ20 Final Lap World Tour dates
Date	City	Country	Venue	Attendance
28 December 2024	Singapore		Singapore National Stadium	60,000
29 December 2024	Singapore		Singapore National Stadium	60,000
8 February 2025	Inglewood (Note: Billed as Los Angeles.)	United States	Kia Forum	12,055
15 February 2025	Toronto	Canada	Scotiabank Arena	14,100
19 February 2025	San Francisco	United States	Chase Center	11,634
22 February 2025	New York City	United States	Barclays Center	13,199
26 February 2025	Boston	United States	Agganis Arena	—
11 March 2025	London	England	The O_{2} Arena	—
22 March 2025	Paris	France	La Défense Arena	12,068 / 15,000
5 April 2025	Sydney	Australia	Qudos Bank Arena	11,735
11 April 2025	Melbourne	Australia	Rod Laver Arena	—
10 May 2025	Kuala Lumpur	Malaysia	Bukit Jalil National Stadium	50,000
24 May 2025	Hong Kong		Kai Tak Stadium	—
25 May 2025	Hong Kong		Kai Tak Stadium	—
7 June 2025	Taipei	Taiwan	Taipei Dome	80,000
8 June 2025	Taipei	Taiwan	Taipei Dome	80,000
14 June 2025	Incheon (Note: Billed as Seoul.)	South Korea	Inspire Arena	—
15 June 2025	Incheon	South Korea	Inspire Arena	—
27 June 2025	Beijing	China	Beijing National Stadium	500,000
28 June 2025	Beijing	China	Beijing National Stadium	500,000
29 June 2025	Beijing	China	Beijing National Stadium	500,000
4 July 2025	Beijing	China	Beijing National Stadium	500,000
5 July 2025	Beijing	China	Beijing National Stadium	500,000
6 July 2025	Beijing	China	Beijing National Stadium	500,000
11 July 2025	Beijing	China	Beijing National Stadium	500,000
12 July 2025	Beijing	China	Beijing National Stadium	500,000
13 July 2025	Beijing	China	Beijing National Stadium	500,000
Total				N/A
