= Cao Cao (album) =

Studio album by JJ Lin
- Released: 17 February 2006
- Recorded: 2005–2006
- Genre: Mandopop
- Length: 42:40
- Language: Mandarin
- Label: Ocean Butterflies

JJ Lin chronology
No. 89757 (2005)	Cao Cao (2006)	Just JJ World Tour 2006 (2006)

Cao Cao (Chinese: 曹操) is the fourth studio album by Singaporean singer JJ Lin, released on 17 February 2006 by Ocean Butterflies.

== Track listing ==
All music is composed by JJ Lin

Cao Cao – Standard edition
No.	Title	Lyrics	Length
1.	"只對你說" (Sarang Heyo)	JJ Lin	3:50
2.	"曹操" (CaoCao)	Eric Lin (林秋離)	4:02
3.	"熟能生巧" (Perfection)	Eric Lin (林秋離)	4:10
4.	"波間帶" (Sign Waves)	Eric Lin (林秋離)	3:34
5.	"原來" (Truth)	Teoh Sze'er (張思爾), Eric Lin (林秋離)	3:44
6.	"不死之身" (Eternal Life)	Eric Lin (林秋離)	3:47
7.	"愛情yogurt" (Love Yogurt)	Yvonne Lin (林怡鳳)	3:45
8.	"進化論" (Metamorphosis)	Isaac Chen (陳鎮川)	4:21
9.	"Now That She's Gone"	JJ Lin	4:31
10.	"你要的不是我" (Scrubbed Out)	Yvonne Lin (林怡鳳)	4:11
11.	"Down"	JJ Lin	2:45
Total length:			42:40

Cao Cao – Singapore and Malaysia edition (bonus track)
No.	Title	Lyrics	Music	Length
1.	"流行主教" (Prince of Pop)	JJ Lin	Rynn Lim (林宇中)	2:11

== Charts ==
=== Weekly charts ===
Chart (2006)	Peak position
Taiwanese Albums (G-Music)	2

=== Year-end charts ===
Chart (2006)	Position
Taiwanese Albums (Note: Best-selling albums of the year in Taiwan as reported by media outlets)	8

== Sales ==
Region	Certification	Certified units/sales
Taiwan	—	200,000
Summaries
Asia	—	2,000,000
