= Haven (JJ Lin album) =

Studio album by JJ Lin
- Released: 8 June 2004
- Recorded: 2004
- Genre: Mandopop
- Length: 48:05
- Language: Mandarin
- Label: Ocean Butterflies

JJ Lin chronology
Music Voyager (2003)	Haven (2004)	No. 89757 (2005)

Singles from Haven
- 1. "River South" Released: 21 May 2004; 2. "Haven" Released: 21 May 2004; 3. "Bullet Train" Released: 8 June 2004; 4. "Mermaid" Released: 8 June 2004

Haven (Chinese: 第二天堂) is the second studio album by Singaporean recording artist JJ Lin, released on 8 June 2004 by Ocean Butterflies.

== Singles ==
On 21 May 2004, the song "Haven" premiered on radio stations in Taiwan, Singapore, and Malaysia, while "River South" premiered on radio stations in mainland China.

== Track listing ==
All music is composed by JJ Lin.

Haven track listing
No.	Title	Lyrics	Length
1.	"一開始..." (In The Beginning...)		1:08
2.	"第二天堂" (Haven)	Zhang Liangzhong (張良忠), Eric Lin (林秋離)	4:26
3.	"子彈列車" (Bullet Train)	Vincent Fang (方文山)	3:24
4.	"起床了" (Morning Call)		0:25
5.	"豆漿油條" (Soya Milk Fried Dough Sticks)	Teoh Sze'er (張思爾)	4:16
6.	"江南" (River South)	Eric Lin (李瑞洵)	4:28
7.	"害怕" (Fear)	Eric Lin (李瑞洵)	4:42
8.	"天使心" (Angel Heart)	Teoh Sze'er (張思爾), Eric Lin (林秋離)	3:59
9.	"森林浴" (In The Woods)		0:23
10.	"精靈" (Elf)	Eric Lin (林秋離)	4:05
11.	"相信無限" (Believe in Infinity)	Teoh Sze'er (張思爾)	3:21
12.	"美人魚" (Mermaid)	Jian Sheng (簡勝), Eric Lin (林秋離)	4:14
13.	"距離" (Distance)	Yvonne Lin (林怡鳳)	4:14
14.	"未完成" (To Be Continued)		0:21
15.	"Endless Road"	JJ Lin	4:39
Total length:			48:05

== Charts ==
Chart positions for Haven
Chart (2004)	Peak position
Singaporean Albums (RIAS)	5

== Sales ==
Region	Certification	Certified units/sales
Asia	—	1,800,000
