= Sound of My Dream =

- 梦想的声音
- Genre: Reality show
- Presented by: Hua Shao
- Judges: JJ Lin; Yu Quan; A-mei; Jam Hsiao; Hebe Tien; Sandy Lam; Jane Zhang; Tiger Hu; Tan Weiwei; Jackson Wang
- Country of origin: China
- Original language: Mandarin

Original release
- Network: Zhejiang Television
- Release: November 4, 2016 – present

Sound of My Dream (Chinese: 梦想的声音) is a Chinese music program. It aired on Zhejiang Satellite TV for three seasons starting November 4, 2016.

== Summary ==
Created by Zhejiang Satellite TV, top singers and amateur singers give mutual advice to each other on how to do their best to show the essence of music. The show consists of a host, celebrity judges/tutors and other music industry experts panelists. While every season the details have changed, the foundational premise remains the same. Every episode a number of talented singers, amateur or otherwise, perform in front of the audience and judges to showcase their talent. Then they are given the chance to "challenge" a celebrity tutor by singing one of the celebrity's songs. In exchange, the celebrity is assigned one of four randomly selected songs and has three hours to come up with a cover performance of this song. Contestant and celebrity then perform after three hours their respective covers, and the expert panelists judge whether the contestant has "defeated" the celebrity with their performance. Categories include singing ability, emotion/performance, musicality, etc. If the contestant is judged to have defeated the celebrity in that round, they are allowed to challenge another celebrity. The goal is to challenge every celebrity singer and defeat them all. However, few contestants have made it past the first round, and only a handful have succeeded in making it to the third round. Prizes for the winners vary by season: Season One gave contestants a chance to perform at the end-of-season concert, while Season Two awarded contestants their own original song (to be composed by the expert panelists) for each celebrity they defeated. This show has made a number of contestants famous, as well as elevated the fame of the celebrity tutors, in particular JJ Lin. The performances and full episodes are uploaded to Zhejiang's YouTube channel: "ZJSTV Music Channel."

== Seasons ==
Edition	Debut date	End date	Host	Guest tutors	Permanent tutors with their seats				
Edition	Debut date	End date	Host	Guest tutors	1	2	3	4	5
1	November 14, 2016	January 13, 2017	Hua Shao	Jane Zhang (12)	JJ Lin	Yu Quan	Zhang Huei Mei	Jam Hsiao	Hebe Tien
2	October 27, 2017	January 19, 2018	Hua Shao	Li Yugang (1); Tiger Hu (2); Li Ronghao (3); A-Lin (4); Henry Lau (5); Wang Peiyu (6); Liang Jingru (7); Harlem Yu (8); Victor Wong (9); Terry Lin (10); Ouyang Nana and Sitar Tan (11); Li Yuchun (12)	–	Yu Quan	Sandy Lam	JJ Lin	Jane Zhang
3	October 26, 2018	January 11, 2019	Hua Shao	Jackson Wang (1–4)	–	Jackson Wang (1–4,12) Jane Zhang (5–12)	Tiger Hu	JJ Lin	Sitar Tan
