= She Says (album) =

Studio album by JJ Lin
- Released: 8 December 2010
- Recorded: 2010
- Genre: Mandopop
- Length: 55:21
- Language: Mandarin
- Label: Ocean Butterflies

JJ Lin chronology
Hundred Days (2009)	She Says (2010)	Lost N Found (2011)

Singles from She Says
- 1. "She Says" Released: 15 November 2010; 2. "When You" Released: 8 December 2010; 3. "Smiling Eyes" Released: 8 December 2010; 4. "Remember" Released: 8 December 2010

She Says (simplified Chinese: 她说; traditional Chinese: 她說) is the eighth studio album by Singaporean singer JJ Lin, released on 8 December 2010 by Ocean Butterflies Music.

== Track listing ==
All music is composed by JJ Lin.

She Says – Standard edition
No.	Title	Lyrics	Length
1.	"她說" (She Says)	Stefanie Sun (孫燕姿)	5:21
2.	"愛笑的眼睛" (Smiling Eyes)	Hong Ruiye (洪瑞業)	4:14
3.	"只對你有感覺" (Only Have Feelings For You)	Zhang Jiawei (張家瑋)	4:27
4.	"當你" (When You)	Teoh Sze'er (張思爾)	4:11
5.	"一眼萬年" (Forever)	Daryl Yao (姚若龍)	4:18
6.	"保護色" (Protective Colors (feat. Angela Chang))	Tina Wang (王雅君), Chen Shuqiu (陳淑秋), JJ Lin	3:19
7.	"握不住的他" (The Taste of Love)	Yvonne Lin (林怡鳳)	3:31
8.	"心牆" (Wall)	Daryl Yao (姚若龍)	3:46
9.	"我很想愛他" (Loving Her)	He Qihong (何啟弘)	4:21
10.	"一生的愛" (Love For A Life Time)	Zennon Goh (吳劍泓)	3:34
11.	"記得" (Remember)	Kevin Yi (易家揚)	4:48
12.	"完美新世界" (Perfect World)	Yvonne Lin (林怡鳳), Venus (許環良)	4:36
13.	"I AM"	Eric Lin (林秋離)	4:55
Total length:			55:21

She Says – Mainland China edition (bonus track)
No.	Title	Lyrics	Length
1.	"真材實料的我" (The Real Me)	Dr.Moon (林子欽)	3:35

== Charts ==
Chart (2011)	Peak position
Taiwanese Albums (G-Music)	9
