= Kym (singer) =

Kym (Jin Sha)
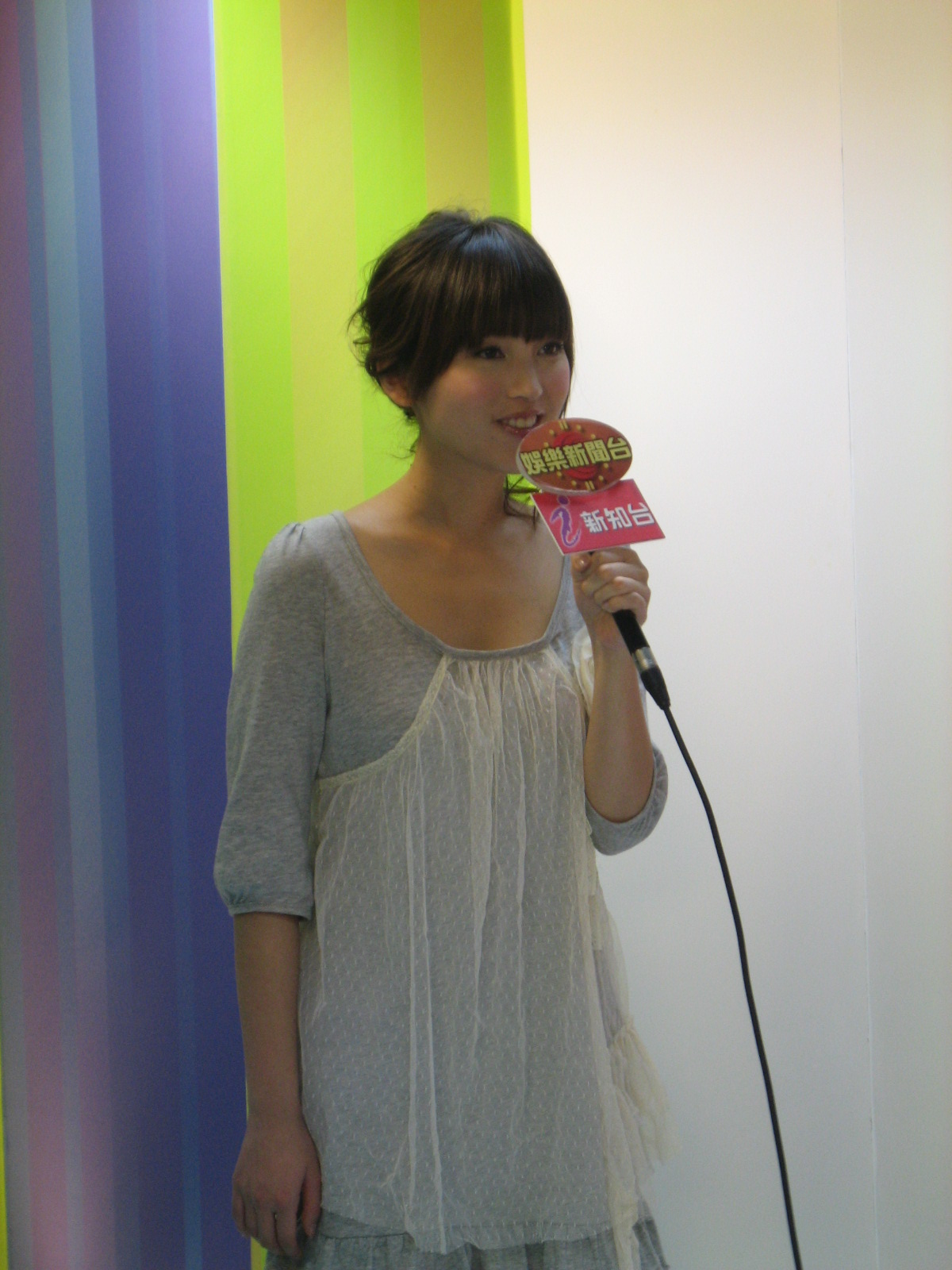
- Kym in 2007
- Born: 金莎; Jin Sha; 14 March 1981 (age 45); Shanghai, China
- Occupations: Singer actress
- Years active: 2003–present
- Musical career
- Also known as: Cream 莎莎
- Genres: Mandopop
- Label: Ocean Butterflies
- Website: blog.sina.com.cn/jinsha kym.youou.com My Space – Jin Sha

Jin Sha (Chinese: 金莎; pinyin: Jīn Shā; born 14 March 1981), better known as Kym, is a Chinese singer and actress. She was born in Shanghai and can speak Mandarin, Shanghainese and English.

== Career ==
Kym's career started with a role in the drama Sky (十八岁的天空) in 2003. In the same year, she appeared in A-do's MV. In 2004, she signed with Ocean Butterflies and released her debut album, Air. She has three duets with JJ Lin who was under the same label. She recently appeared as a judge on a singing competition in which the winner would get to collaborate with JJ Lin.

In 2005 the actress started her music career signing under the label Ocean Butterflies in which she would release her debut album entitled "Air", which sold over 200.000 copies in Mainland China. The most popular hit of the album was the song "The summer that wind took away" in which she counted with the collaboration of JJ Lin.

Due to her rising popularity, the actress and performer released a second album that was also well received by the Chinese audience, a great popularity that would soon spread to Taiwan, where her music label released a compilation of her best known songs till that moment. This compilation would be followed, two months later, by the release of her third studio album in the mainland.

In 2008, Jin Sha starred the dramas "The tears of happiness" and "Little romance in the big city" that were both filmed in Xiamen and aired by Xiamen Media Group. She would also sing the opening and image themes for those successful dramas.

In 2009 the actress participated as the leading character in the acclaimed TV series "The Myth" that was directed by Jackie Chan and aired by China Central Television, the national Chinese broadcaster. After the series, Jin Sha released an extended play and started preparing her following studio album, in which she would participate, for the first time, as lyricist and composer. This album would come out one year later with the title of "Legends", that would turn into her very last release under Ocean Butterflies.

From 2011 on, Jin Sha went on developing her music and performing career and she signed with the label TH Entertainment where she would release her following music releases.

== Discography ==
=== Studio albums ===
Date of release	Title (Chinese)	Title (English)
2005 April 23	空气	Air
2006 May 28	不可思议	Unbelievable
2007 March 9	不可思议金选	Best of Kym
2007 May 30	换季	New Season
2010 October 27	星月神話	Legends
2012 February 2	他不愛我	He Doesn't Love Me

=== EPs ===
Date of release	Tltle (Chinese)	Title (English)
2009 February 9	這種愛	This Love
2012 July 30	等你說愛我	I'll Wait for You to Say That You Love Me

== Filmography ==
=== Films ===
Year	Title	Role	Notes
2007	Crossed Lines	Mi Hong	
2010	Here Comes Fortune		
2011	Big Big Man		
2013	Lemon		
2013	Walking Youth		
2019	Concubine's Man		

=== TV series ===
Year	Title	Role	Notes
2003	Sky	Lan Feilin	
2003	Pink Ladies		guest star
2008	Tears of Happiness	He Tongyao	
2008	Small Romance in the Big City		
2009	The Myth	Lü Su	
2010	Detective Tanglang		
2012	King's Wife		
2018	Back to the Ming Dynasty		
2020	Sisters Who Make Waves	cast member	
