= Stories Untold (album) =

Studio album by JJ Lin
- Released: 13 March 2013
- Recorded: 2012–2013
- Genre: Mandopop
- Length: 48:50
- Language: Mandarin
- Label: Warner

JJ Lin chronology
Lost N Found (2011)	Stories Untold (2013)	Genesis (2014)

Alternative cover

Singles from Stories Untold
- 1. "You N Me" Released: 18 February 2013; 2. "Practice Love" Released: 1 March 2013; 3. "The Dark Knight" Released: 18 March 2013; 4. "Before Sunrise" Released: 24 April 2013

Stories Untold (Chinese: 因你而在; pinyin: yīn nǐ ér zài) is the tenth studio album by Singaporean singer JJ Lin, released on 13 March 2013, by Warner Music Taiwan. It produced singles such as "Practice Love", "You N Me", "The Dark Knight", and "Before Sunrise".

== Commercial performance ==
Stories Untold peaked at number one on the G-Music album chart in Taiwan for multiple non-consecutive weeks. It was the second best-selling album of 2013 in the country, selling 78,000 copies. In Hong Kong, the album reached number eight on the Hong Kong Record Merchants Association (HKRMA) album chart. In Singapore, Stories Untold was certified platinum by the Recording Industry Association Singapore (RIAS) for surpassing sales of 10,000 units.

== Track listing ==
All music is composed by JJ Lin.

Stories Untold track listing
No.	Title	Lyrics	Length
1.	"因你而在" (You N Me)	Tina Wang (王雅君)	4:26
2.	"零度的親吻" (Frozen Kiss)	Yvonne Lin (林怡鳳)	3:51
3.	"黑暗騎士" (The Dark Knight (feat. Mayday Ashin))	Mayday Ashin (五月天 阿信)	5:04
4.	"修煉愛情" (Practice Love)	Kevin Yi (易家揚)	4:47
5.	"飛機" (Fly Back In Time (feat. Eugene Lim))	Teoh Sze'er (張思爾)	4:29
6.	"巴洛克先生" (Mr. Baroque)		0:45
7.	"One Shot (feat. Wang Leehom)"	JJ Lin, Mike Chang	4:29
8.	"裂縫中的陽光" (Before Sunrise)	Wu Qing-feng (吳青峰)	3:49
9.	"友人說" (Somebody (feat. Harry Chang))	Eriky Lee (李念和)	4:11
10.	"十秒的衝動" (10 Seconds Of Insane Bravery)	Daryl Yao (姚若龍)	4:21
11.	"以後要做的事" (Future Tense)	Tina Wang (王雅君)	4:21
12.	"一千年後記得我" (Remember, Forever)	Eric Lin (林秋離)	4:17
Total length:			48:50

== Charts ==
=== Weekly charts ===
Chart (2013)	Peak position
Hong Kong Albums (HKRMA)	8
Taiwanese Albums (G-Music)	1

=== Year-end charts ===
Chart (2013)	Position
Taiwanese Albums (Note: Best-selling albums of the year in Taiwan as reported by media outlets)	2

== Certifications ==
Region	Certification	Certified units/sales
Singapore (RIAS)	Platinum	10,000^{*}
Taiwan	—	78,000
^{*} Sales figures based on certification alone.
