= Lost N Found =

Studio album by JJ Lin
- Released: 31 December 2011
- Recorded: 2011
- Genre: Mandopop
- Language: Mandarin
- Label: Warner

JJ Lin chronology
She Says (2010)	Lost N Found (2011)	Stories Untold (2013)

Singles from Lost N Found
- 1. "Never Learn" Released: 7 December 2011; 2. "Love U U" Released: 20 January 2012; 3. "Those Were The Days" Released: 10 February 2012

Lost N Found (simplified Chinese: 学不会; traditional Chinese: 學不會) is the ninth studio album by Singaporean singer JJ Lin, released on 31 December 2011 by Warner Music Taiwan.

== Songs ==
The album's lead single, "Never Learn", premiered on radio stations in Asia on 7 December 2011. Other singles include "Those Were the Days" and "Love U U".

== Track listing ==
All music is composed by JJ Lin

No.	Title	Lyrics	Length
1.	"Prologue"		0:54
2.	"學不會" (Never Learn)	Daryl Yao (姚若龍)	3:50
3.	"故事細膩" (Romantic Mystery)	Vincent Fang (方文山)	3:35
4.	"那些你很冒險的夢" (Those Were The Days)	Tina Wang (王雅君)	4:04
5.	"白羊夢" (Aries)	David Ke (葛大為)	4:12
6.	"靈魂的共鳴" (Variation 25: Clash of The Souls)	Wu I-Wei (吳易緯 (生命樹樂團))	4:26
7.	"We Together"	Tian Tian (天天)	4:28
8.	"Cinderella"	JJ Lin	4:51
9.	"白蘭花" (Gardenia)	Eric Lin (林秋離)	4:09
10.	"陌生老朋友" (Dear Friend)	Albert Leung (林夕)	3:49
11.	"不存在的情人" (Nonexistent)	Wu Qing-feng (吳青峰)	4:03
12.	"Love U U"	Cecilia Lam (林天愛)	3:40
Total length:			46:01

== Charts ==
=== Weekly charts ===
Chart (2012)	Peak position
Hong Kong Albums (HKRMA)	5
Taiwanese Albums (G-Music)	1

=== Year-end charts ===
Chart (2012)	Position
Taiwanese Albums (Note: Best-selling albums of the year in Taiwan as reported by media outlets)	5

== Certifications ==
Region	Certification	Certified units/sales
Singapore (RIAS)	Platinum	10,000^{*}
Taiwan	—	55,000
^{*} Sales figures based on certification alone.
