= Genesis (JJ Lin album) =

Studio album by JJ Lin
- Released: 27 December 2014
- Recorded: 2014
- Genre: Mandopop
- Language: Mandarin
- Label: Warner

JJ Lin chronology
Stories Untold (2013)	Genesis (2014)	From M.E. to Myself (2015)

Singles from Genesis
- 1. "Brave New World" Released: 2 December 2014; 2. "If Only" Released: 15 December 2014; 3. "The Romantic" Released: 8 January 2015; 4. "Beautiful" Released: 11 February 2015

Genesis (Chinese: 新地球) is the eleventh studio album by Singaporean singer JJ Lin, released on 27 December 2014 by Warner Music Taiwan. The album feature collaboration with Jason Mraz, G.E.M., and Jung Yong-hwa.

== Promotion ==
On 10 December 2014, a Music Video Premiere event was held at Huashan1914 Creative Park.

On 24 December 2014, a press conference was held in Taipei. As the event was held on Christmas's Eve and to commemorate JJ Lin's tenth year in the music industry, a "Genesis Christmas Tree" was presented to him.

== Track listing ==
All music is composed by JJ Lin.

Genesis – Standard edition
No.	Title	Lyrics	Length
1.	"迴" (Flashback)		2:13
2.	"新地球" (Brave New World)	Eric Lin (林秋離)	4:37
3.	"水仙" (The Gardens)	Tina Wang (王雅君)	4:01
4.	"浪漫血液" (The Romantic Blood)	Daryl Yao (姚若龍)	4:33
5.	"黑鍵" (Black Keys)	Mayday Ashin (五月天 阿信)	5:28
6.	"手心的薔薇 featuring G.E.M. 鄧紫棋" (Rose in the palm of your hand)	Yvonne Lin (林怡鳳)	4:40
7.	"可惜沒如果" (If Only)	Albert Leung (林夕)	4:58
8.	"I Am Alive featuring Jason Mraz"	JJ Lin, Jason Mraz, Michael Natter, Nancy Natter	4:26
9.	"愛的鼓勵" (Love Encouragement)	Wu Qing-feng (吳青峰)	3:49
10.	"茉莉雨" (Jasmine Raindrops)	Vincent Fang (方文山)	4:17
11.	"生生" (The Beacon)	Yvonne Lin (林怡鳳)	4:18
Total length:			47:20

Genesis – Human Disc 2
No.	Title	Lyrics	Length
1.	"Checkmate featuring Jung Yong-hwa"	JJ Lin, Jung Yong-hwa	3:57
2.	"Lamando"	Color Lee (李若君)	4:18

== Accolades ==
List of awards
Year	Award	Category	Nominated work	Result	Ref.
2015	Global Chinese Music Awards	Best Composer	"If Only"	Won	
2015	Global Chinese Music Awards	Top Twenty Hits	"If Only"	Won	
2015	Global Chinese Golden Chart Awards	Best Producer	Genesis	Won	
2015	Global Chinese Golden Chart Awards	Top Twenty Hits	"Brave New World"	Won	
2015	QQ Music Awards	Best Producer (HK/Taiwan)	"Brave New World"	Won	
2015	QQ Music Awards	Best Mandarin Album (HK/Taiwan)	Genesis	Won	
2015	V Chart Awards	Best Producer (HK/Taiwan)	Genesis	Won	
2016	Hito Music Awards	Hito Best Producer	Genesis	Won	
2016	Hito Music Awards	Top Ten Chinese Songs of the Year	"If Only"	Won	

== Charts ==
=== Weekly charts ===
Chart (2015)	Peak position
Hong Kong Albums (HKRMA)	6
US World Albums (Billboard)	9

=== Year-end charts ===
Chart (2014)	Position
Taiwanese Albums (Note: Best-selling albums of the year in Taiwan as reported by media outlets)	2

Chart (2015)	Position
Taiwanese Albums	8

== Certifications ==
Region	Certification	Certified units/sales
Singapore (RIAS)	Platinum	10,000^{*}
Taiwan	—	95,000
^{*} Sales figures based on certification alone.
