= Happily, Painfully After =

Studio album by JJ Lin
- Released: 21 April 2023
- Genre: Pop
- Length: 45:49
- Language: Mandarin; English
- Label: JFJ Productions

JJ Lin chronology
Drifter / Like You Do (2020)	Happily, Painfully After (2023)

Happily, Painfully After (Chinese: 重拾_快樂; pinyin: Chóng shí_Kuàilè) is the fifteenth studio album by Singaporean singer JJ Lin, released digitally on 21 April 2023, through his own label JFJ Productions. The physical version was released in 7 September 2023.

== Background and release ==
"Finding happiness" is the core concept of the album, exploring and reflecting Lin's understanding of the happiness and pain in the process of life, and transforming it into the power to move forward and share it with the audience.

Happily, Painfully After was the best-selling album of 2023 on music platforms in mainland China, with sales exceeding 900,000 copies. On Taiwan's Top Five Album Weekly Sales Chart, the physical version of Happily, Painfully After topped the chart with 81.37% of sales upon release, and was the best-selling album of 2023.

== Track listing ==
No.	Title	Lyrics	Music	Length
1.	"Dust and Ashes" (願與愁)	Xian Han	JJ Lin	3:51
2.	"Liv' a Little" (逆光白)	Yi Jiayang	JJ Lin	3:24
3.	"Happily, Painfully After" (孤獨娛樂)	Yi Jiayang	JJ Lin	3:59
4.	"Braindance" (夢不凌亂)	Vincent Fang	JJ Lin	3:50
5.	"Self Portrait" (自畫像)	Lin Yifeng	JJ Lin	3:46
6.	"Hero" (謝幕)	Lin Yifeng / Lin Qiuli	JJ Lin	4:03
7.	"One Last Thing" (如果我還剩一件事情可以做)	Xiao Han	JJ Lin	4:09
8.	"Bloom" (黑色泡沫)	Zhou Xinting / Yang Tong	JJ Lin	3:53
9.	"Satisfaction" (你都在)	Lin Yifeng / Rude Cat	JJ Lin / Rude Cat	3:17
10.	"A Moment in Time" (一時的選擇)	Cai Youqi	Cai Youqi	3:57
11.	"Castle in the Air"	JJ Lin	JJ Lin	3:51
12.	"JJ20" (7千3百多天)	Vincent Fang	JJ Lin	3:43
Total length:				45:49
