= Drifter / Like You Do =

- Drifter cover

Studio album by JJ Lin
- Released: 20 October 2020
- Genre: Pop
- Length: 55:19
- Language: Mandarin; English
- Label: Warner

JJ Lin chronology
Message in a Bottle (2017)	Drifter / Like You Do (2020)	Happily, Painfully After (2023)

Alternative cover
- Like You Do cover

Singles from Drifter / Like You Do
- 1. "No Turning Back" Released: 20 October 2020; 2. "Message in a Bottle" Released: 22 April 2021

Drifter / Like You Do (Chinese: 倖存者 · 如你; pinyin: Xìngcún Zhě · Rú Nǐ) is the fourteenth studio album and first double album by Singaporean singer JJ Lin, released on 20 October 2020, through Warner Music. The first disc, Drifter, contains six Mandarin songs including the single "No Turning Back", which reached number one on the China TME Uni Chart. The second disc, Like You Do, contains eight English songs including the single "Bedroom" featuring Anne-Marie, which was released on 22 April 2021.

== Background and release ==
JJ Lin's thirteenth album, Message in a Bottle, was released in December 2017 to commercial success. In early 2020, JJ Lin revealed in the variety show I Am a Singer that he would release a new album by the end of the year.

Speculation of the album and the concept of the new album began on 23 August 2020, when JJ Lin posted a new post introducing the idea of "parallel continuum" on Weibo and other social media. On 3 September 2020, JJ Lin posted a poster with tag "#No Turning Back#" on Weibo as a teaser for Drifter / Like You Do's title song, "No Turning Back". The song and its music video was released on 16 September 2020. On 13 October, JJ Lin announced his fourteenth album would be released on 20 October 2020; he would hold a global online listening party for the album the night before the release.

== Conception ==
JJ Lin assumed creative control over all aspects of the record. The release of Drifter / Like You Do contains two EPs, each with its own storyline. The two storylines were conceived to run parallel and eventually intersect with one another.

In Drifter / Like You Do, it brings the idea that time and space are not continuous from quantum theory. The theory leads to the conjecture about the parallel spacetimes. The conception of this album is based on the assumption of the existence of parallel spacetime. JJ Lin mentioned his interpretation to this record on the global listening party and press release. He said that there were light and darkness in our life, and there were also tendency to hold on and to let it go in our conscious. The album is about a rediscovery of our life and tells a story about everyone in this world. He commented, "My voice could be you, as your voice could be mine."

=== Title ===
The name of the first EP Drifter in Chinese means "survivor" (Chinese:幸存者). On the global online listening party JJ Lin held before the album released, JJ Lin believed that everyone living in this universe is a survivor. He stated that he has been prepared this album for three years. Drifter / Like You Do record images and experience JJ Lin experienced during the three years. JJ explained that during this long journey, there were things that people gained, lost and felt regret. There are many regrets that happened under the different circumstance in this album. But, the album is themed on exploring the meaning of time, space, you and me and telling survivors who have many regrets to have a restart.

== Track listing ==
Drifter – disc 1
No.	Title	Length
1.	"Embark" (最嚮往的地方)	3:52
2.	"No Turning Back" (交換餘生)	4:36
3.	"Drifter" (倖存者)	4:41
4.	"The Lost Ones" (離開的那一些)	4:37
5.	"So Be It" (最好是)	4:32
6.	"Passing Through" (暫時的記號)	4:13
Total length:		26:31

Like You Do – disc 2
No.	Title	Length
1.	"While I Can"	3:27
2.	"Like You Do"	3:16
3.	"Not Tonight"	3:51
4.	"All in Your Mind"	3:05
5.	"Head On"	2:53
6.	"Steady My Love"	4:13
7.	"Bedroom" (featuring Anne-Marie)	3:23
8.	"Not Tonight" (Tomorrow Sounds Good Steve Aoki Remix)	4:40
Total length:		28:48

== Charts ==
=== Weekly charts ===
Charts for Drifter / Like You Do
Chart (2020)	Peak position
Hong Kong Albums (HKRMA)	6
