= From M.E. to Myself =

Studio album by JJ Lin
- Released: 25 December 2015
- Recorded: 2015
- Genre: Mandopop
- Length: 1:00:28
- Language: Mandarin
- Label: Warner

JJ Lin chronology
Genesis (2014)	From M.E. to Myself (2015)	Message in a Bottle (2017)

Alternative cover

Singles from From M.E. to Myself
- 1. "Twilight" Released: 4 December 2015; 2. "The Key" Released: 30 December 2015

From M.E. to Myself (simplified Chinese: 和自己对话; traditional Chinese: 和自己對話) is the twelfth studio album by Singaporean singer JJ Lin, released on 25 December 2015 by Warner Music Taiwan.

The album earned Lin two Golden Melody Awards for Best Mandarin Male Singer and Best Composer for "Twilight".

== Track listing ==
All music is composed by JJ Lin

From M.E. to Myself – Standard edition
No.	Title	Lyrics	Length
1.	"序曲：調音" (Tuning Up)		1:11
2.	"不為誰而作的歌" (Twilight)	Eric Lin (林秋離)	4:26
3.	"序曲：中場休息" (Intermission)		0:55
4.	"關鍵詞" (The Key)	Yvonne Lin (林怡鳳)	3:28
5.	"只要有你的地方 - 晚安版" (By Your Side (Bedtime))	Albert Leung (林夕)	4:37
6.	"彈唱" (A Song for You Till the End of Time)	Teoh Sze'er (張思爾)	3:11
7.	"有夢不難" (Adolescent)	Vincent Fang (方文山)	4:31
8.	"序曲：Welcome to the Livehouse"		0:57
9.	"Too Bad"	JJ Lin, Yvonne Lin (林怡鳳)	4:20
10.	"你 有沒有過 - Livehouse版" (Roll On (Livehouse))	Yvonne Lin (林怡鳳)	4:37
11.	"12年前" (12 Years)		6:07
12.	"現在的我和她" (No Longer Us)	Fan Weiren (范維仁)	2:45
13.	"序曲：海邊 初" (The Beach Arrival)		0:29
14.	"Lier And Accuser"	JJ Lin	5:11
15.	"獨舞" (The Lone Ranger)	Wu Qing-feng (吳青峰)	3:34
16.	"序曲：海邊 終" (The Beach Departure)		1:16
17.	"你 有沒有過" (Roll On)	Yvonne Lin (林怡鳳)	4:01
18.	"只要有你的地方" (By Your Side)	Albert Leung (林夕)	4:52
Total length:			1:00:28

From M.E. to Myself – Limited edition (bonus track)
No.	Title	Lyrics	Length
19.	"全面開戰 feat. Jimmy Lin" (Clan Wars)	Li Ruojun (李若君)	3:31

== Charts ==
=== Weekly charts ===
Chart (2016)	Peak position
Hong Kong Albums (HKRMA)	10

=== Year-end charts ===
Chart (2015)	Position
Taiwanese Albums (Note: Best-selling albums of the year in Taiwan as reported by media outlets)	2

Chart (2016)	Position
Taiwanese Albums	8

== Certifications ==
Region	Certification	Certified units/sales
Singapore (RIAS)	Platinum	10,000^{*}
Taiwan	—	90,000
^{*} Sales figures based on certification alone.
