= JJ Lin =

Singaporean singer-songwriter (born 1981)

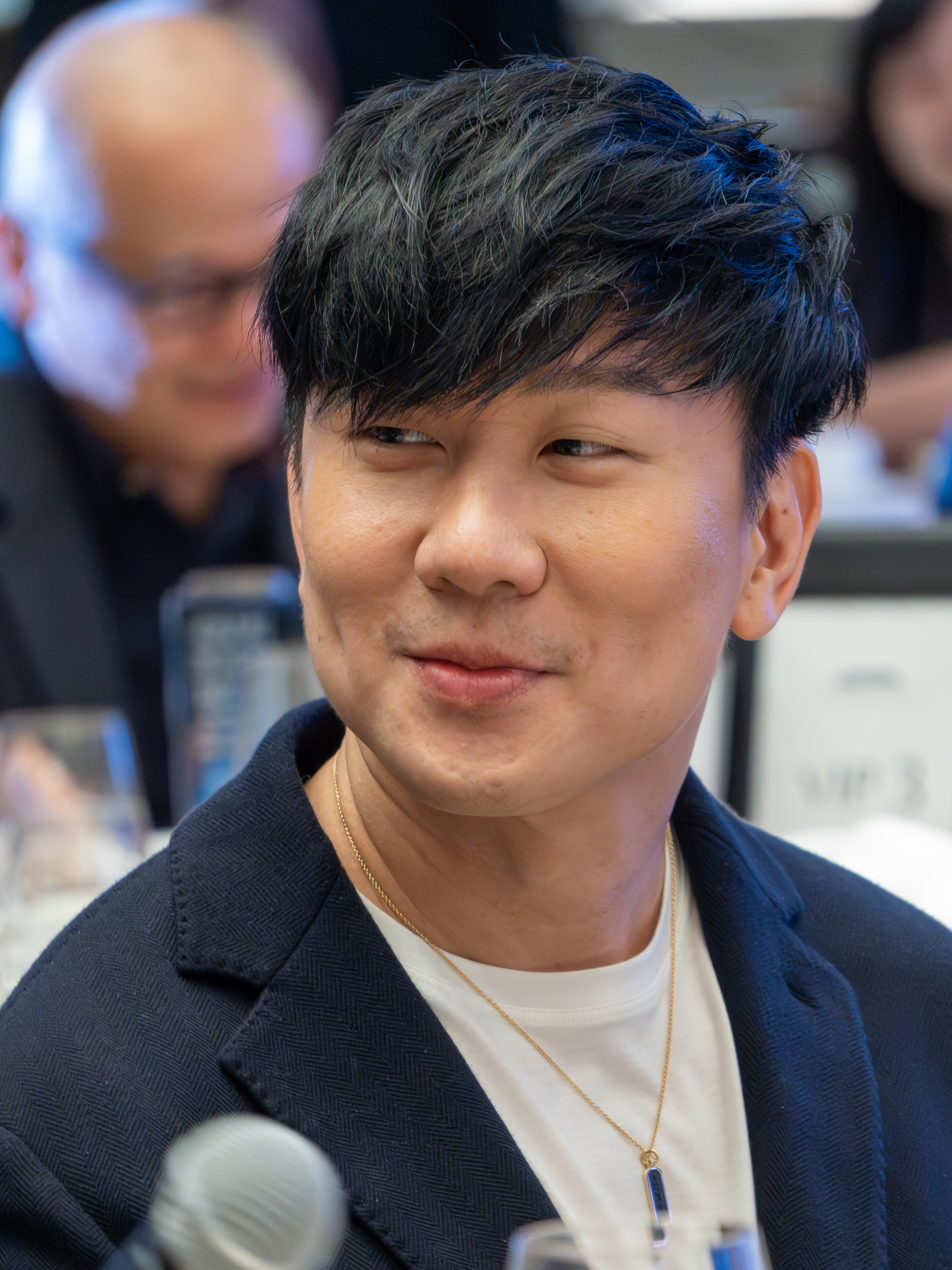
- Lin in 2025
- Born: 27 March 1981 (age 45); Singapore
- Education: Saint Andrew's Junior College
- Occupations: Singer-songwriter; record producer; businessman; actor; author
- Years active: 2003–present
- Organizations: JFJ Productions; Team SMG
- Musical career
- Origin: Singapore
- Genres: Mandopop; R&B; Chinese rock
- Instruments: Vocals; piano; guitar
- Labels: Ocean Butterflies; Warner; JFJ Productions
- Website: jjlin.com

Chinese name
- Traditional Chinese: 林俊傑
- Simplified Chinese: 林俊杰
Transcriptions
Standard Mandarin
- Hanyu Pinyin: Lín Jùnjié
Yue: Cantonese
- Jyutping: Lam4 Zeon3 Git6
Southern Min
- Hokkien POJ: Lîm Chùn-kia̍t

Wayne Lim Junjie (Chinese: 林俊傑; pinyin: Lín Jùnjié; born 27 March 1981), professionally known as JJ Lin, is a Singaporean singer, songwriter, record producer, and businessman. Known for his vocal performances in the Chinese-speaking world, Lin achieved recognition with his pop ballads, songwriting, and emotional vocal delivery.

Lin signed to Ocean Butterflies International in 2002, and debuted with the album Music Voyager (2003). The record went on to sell over 1.2 million copies across Asia. His sophomore album, Haven (2004), was also a top-seller and produced the single "River South", which went on to receive significant popularity in Greater China. Cao Cao (2006) sold over 2 million copies across Asia, including over 200,000 copies in Taiwan. In March 2007, Lin established his own label and production company JFJ Productions.

By 2008, each of Lin's studio albums had sold over 1 million copies across Asia. He continued to experience commercial success with the release of She Says (2010), Lost N Found (2011), Stories Untold (2013), and Genesis (2014). His next album From M.E. to Myself (2015) produced the hit single "Twilight", while Message in a Bottle (2017) produced the single "Little Big Us". Four of Lin's albums have been certified platinum by the Recording Industry Association Singapore (RIAS) since certifications began in 2018. He has embarked on five concert tours since his debut, including the JJ20 World Tour (2022–2025), which has attracted over 2.6 million people.

Lin's accolades include four Golden Melody Awards, including one for Best New Artist and two for Best Mandarin Male Singer, and fourteen Singapore Hit Awards. Aside from music, Lin has launched various business ventures including the professional esports Team SMG and the app-based NFT community ARC. In 2017, Lin founded the coffee franchise Miracle Coffee, which has expanded into eleven locations in Taiwan, Singapore, and China.

== Early life ==
Lin was born in Singapore to a Hokkien family and studied at Jing Shan Primary School, Anglo-Chinese School (Independent) and Saint Andrew's Junior College before completing his National Service (NS). Lin's grandfather used to run a maritime transport business when Lin was young. Lin's father has a telecommunications-related business while his mother owns a family karaoke chain and has a background in Chinese classical music, hence influencing Lin's music. His brother, a manager in a European bank, was a major influence in his career choice.

== Career ==
=== 2003–2006: Debut and career beginnings ===
In addition to Mandarin, Lin also sings in English, Hokkien and Cantonese using a romanized pronunciation system, and has released his songs in Cantonese. In Taiwan, he was awarded the Best New Artist award at the Golden Melody Awards. After completing his NS, Lin signed with Ocean Butterflies International, which launched the then 22-year-old Lin's debut album in 2003.

He is well known for his songwriting and singing skills. He wrote songs for various musical artists while he was still a trainee under Ocean Butterflies under his mentors, Billy Koh and Sunkist Ng. In total, he has written over a hundred songs for other artists. His notable compositions include "Remember" (記得) for Taiwanese singer A-Mei, A-Do's "Let Go" (放手), Harlem Yu's "What's Wrong With You?" (乾嘛你看不爽我), Cyndi Wang's "When You" (當你), Vivian Hsu's "Smiling Eyes" (愛笑的眼睛), and Comic Boyz's "Heart of Superman" (超人心). In Singapore, he was selected to perform the remixed version of "Home", the theme song of the National Day Parade in 2004. Lin has sold 1 million copies in less than a week and is extremely successful throughout Asia.

=== 2007–2009: Commercial success and recognition ===
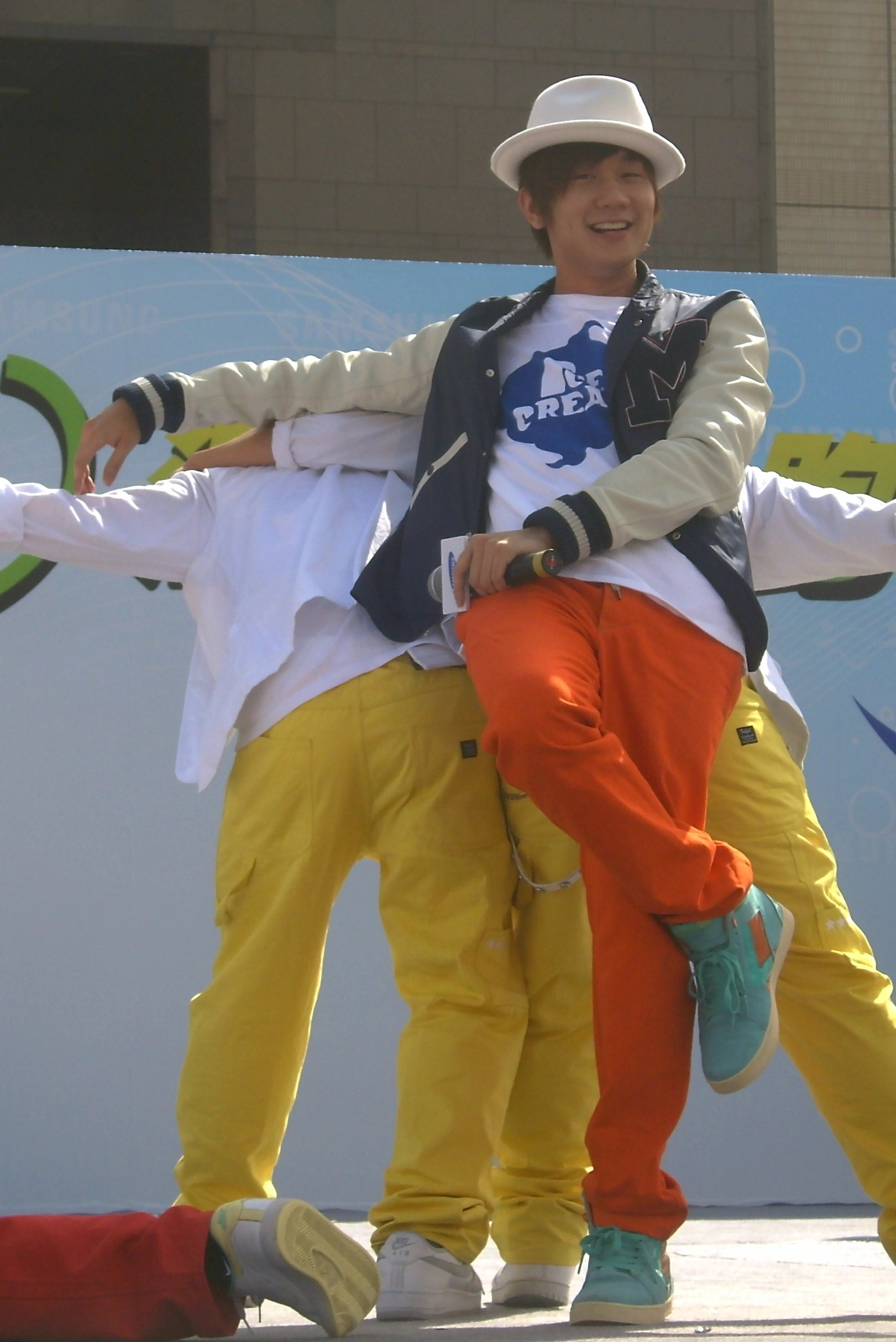
Lin in 2008

In July 2007, he broke a Guinness record by signing 3,052 CDs in 2 hours and 30 minutes. During the signing, he was not allowed to drink or eat. The average time for him to sign a CD was 2.7 seconds. In May 2008, he performed at the CCTV charity event The Giving of Love, dedicated to helping victims of the 2008 Sichuan earthquake. Lin also donated a large sum of money to the rescue efforts and composed a song "Love and Hope" (Chinese: 愛與希望; pinyin: Ài Yǚ Xī Wàng) commemorating the tragedy. In February 2008, Lin released a compilation album entitled Waiting for Love (Chinese: 期待愛; pinyin: Qīdài Ài). It has selected tracks from several of his albums spanning from his debut album to 2007's West Side. Later in October of that year, his sixth album, Sixology (Chinese: 陸; pinyin: Liù), was released, and it sold 280,000 copies in a week. His own fashion line, SMUDGE, was opened in Singapore during 2008 Christmas with an unofficial launch. The store's official launch was on 13 March 2009.

In May 2009, Lin won three awards at the 14th annual Composers and Authors Society of the UK (Compass) Awards Presentations, a ceremony that honors performers in the music scene. It was held at the Royal Albert Hall, Hyde Park, Buckingham Palace and Raffles City Convention Centre, Singapore. He was honored with the Top Local Artiste of the Year award, which is given out to Singaporean artists who generated the highest royalty earnings for the year. In that same year, Lin won the Singapore Youth Award. In 2009, his singing career was put on hold due to his voice being damaged by acid reflux and flu, as well as his hectic touring and recording schedules. His poor health forced him to return to Singapore to recover and receive treatments. On 18 December 2009, he released the seventh album, Hundred Days.

In May 2010, Lin performed in America for the first time at the Asian Pacific American Heritage Month Concert Tour (APAHM). In June 2010, Lin performed together with American singer Sean Kingston at the opening concert of the Marina Bay Sands to thousands of invited VIPs guests. But both were absent at the inaugural YOG Opening Ceremony. Lin's eighth and last album with Ocean Butterflies, She Says, was released on 8 December 2010.

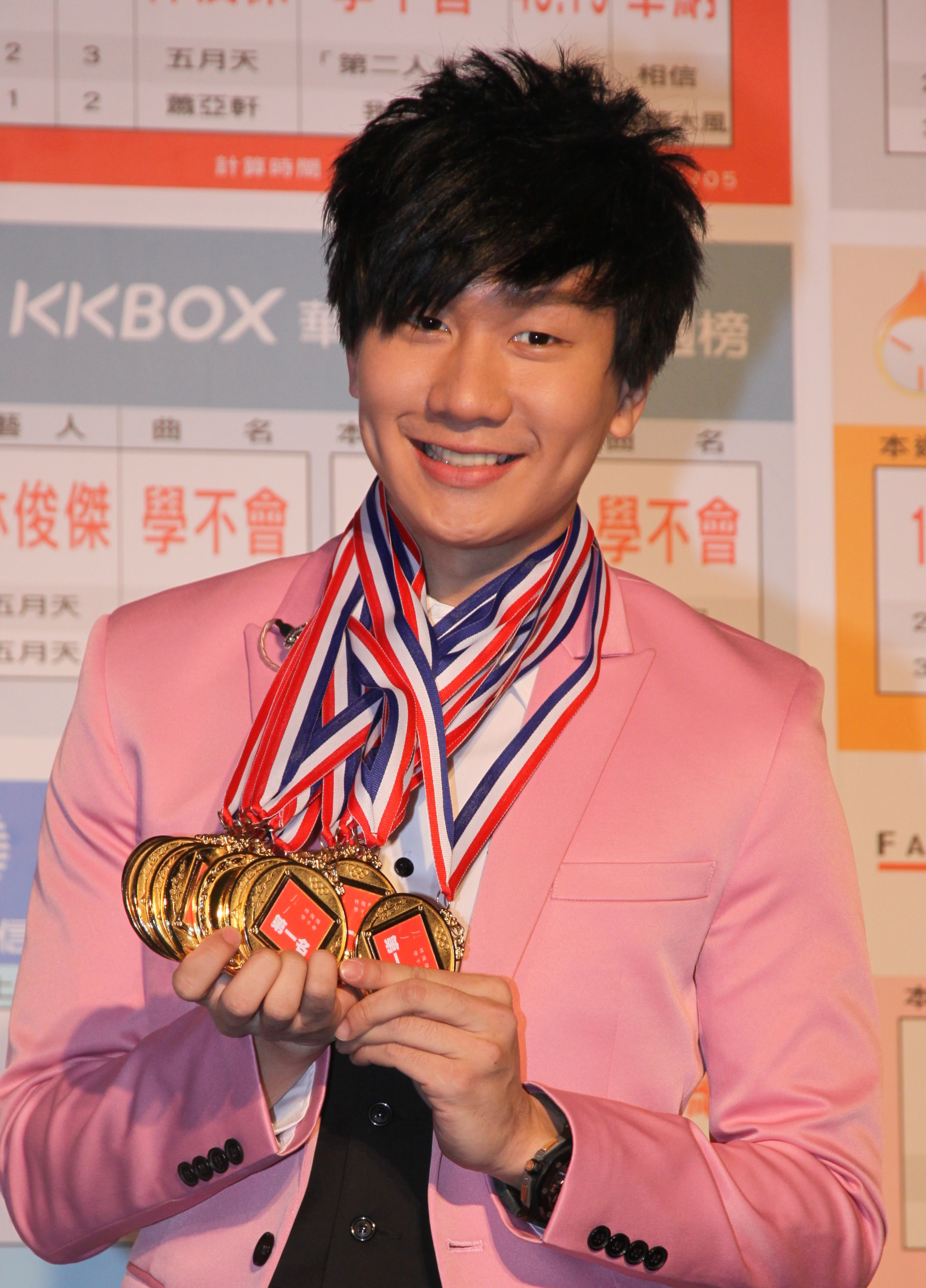
Lin in 2012

=== 2011–2013: New record label and continued success ===
In 2011, Lin signed a new contract with the record label Warner Music Taiwan. Lin's ninth studio album, Lost N Found (學不會) was released on 31 December 2011. A preview of his 9th album was made available on 12 December 2011 on various Chinese internet radio channels. Lin's tenth anniversary album, Stories Untold (因你而在) was released on 13 March 2013. A compilation of micro films were released in conjunction with the album, serving to expand the stories behind the songs. He worked with a few notable people on the album, including Ashin, Harry Chang (張懷秋), and his older brother Eugene Lim (林俊峰). He also started his world tour "Timeline" in July 2013 in Taipei, Taiwan.

=== 2014–2019: Performances, songwriting and touring ===
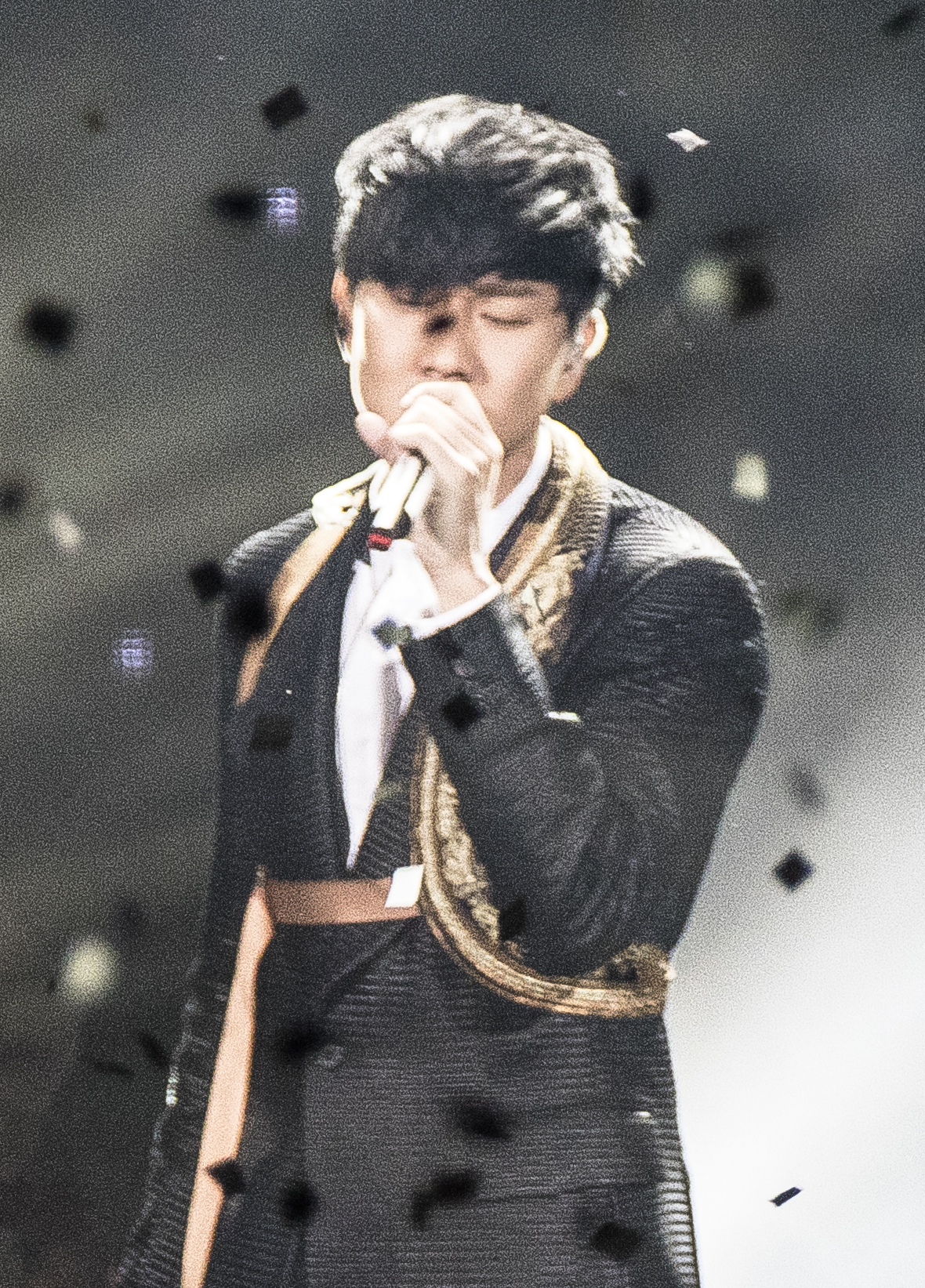
Lin at the 2015 KKBox Music Awards

Lin co-wrote the song "Dreams" with Goh Kheng Long and Corrinne May and performed the song live during the grand finale at the Chingay Parade on 27 and 28 February 2015. One of his recent ventures in the world of music was a duet with Ayumi Hamasaki, for the latter's music video, "The Gift" (and as of 27 April 2015, has about 1,882,459-page views). In 2015, he was selected to perform the National Day Theme Song, "Our Singapore", which was composed by Dick Lee. His experimental album From M.E. to Myself was released on 25 December 2015. The track, "Twlight", is among the most-viewed Chinese music videos on YouTube at 162 million views. On 7 July 2016, Lin released "If Miracles had a Sound", a 96-minute music documentary created over the course of 455 days, taking place throughout studios in the U.S., Singapore, Malaysia, Hong Kong, and Taiwan. The theme song of the documentary, "Infinity and Beyond" (超越无限) was released on 21 June 2016.

On 19 December 2017, JJ Lin posted on his Instagram page that the past two years "had not been easy" and that he had been "searching constantly for a clear direction", needing a "shelter for the soul, a 'SANCTUARY'". He wrote songs and finished his Message in a Bottle album, which was released on 29 December 2017. At the same time, he and his team and "shared a common vision, starting on project "SANCTUARY" and built the space from ground zero". In early 2018, he announced his "Sanctuary" concert tour began in Shanghai on 17 March. In 2019, he released The Story of Us (Chinese: 将故事写成我们), and actress Wu Jinyan starred in the music video.

=== 2020–present: Recent works ===
In January 2020, Lin released a song "I'll Stay With You" dedicated to the medical staff in Wuhan, China, who were working hard to save patients infected with COVID-19. On 20 October 2021, Lin released his first album that contains songs in English, titled "Like You Do". He also collaborated with English singer Anne-Marie in producing the song "Bedroom".

In April 2023, Lin released his fifteenth studio album, Happily, Painfully After.

In April 2025, NetEase Cloud Music named Lin as the artist with the second-highest number of songs surpassing 100 million streams in the platform's 12-year history at 65 songs.

== Other ventures ==
=== Ambassadorships and show appearances ===
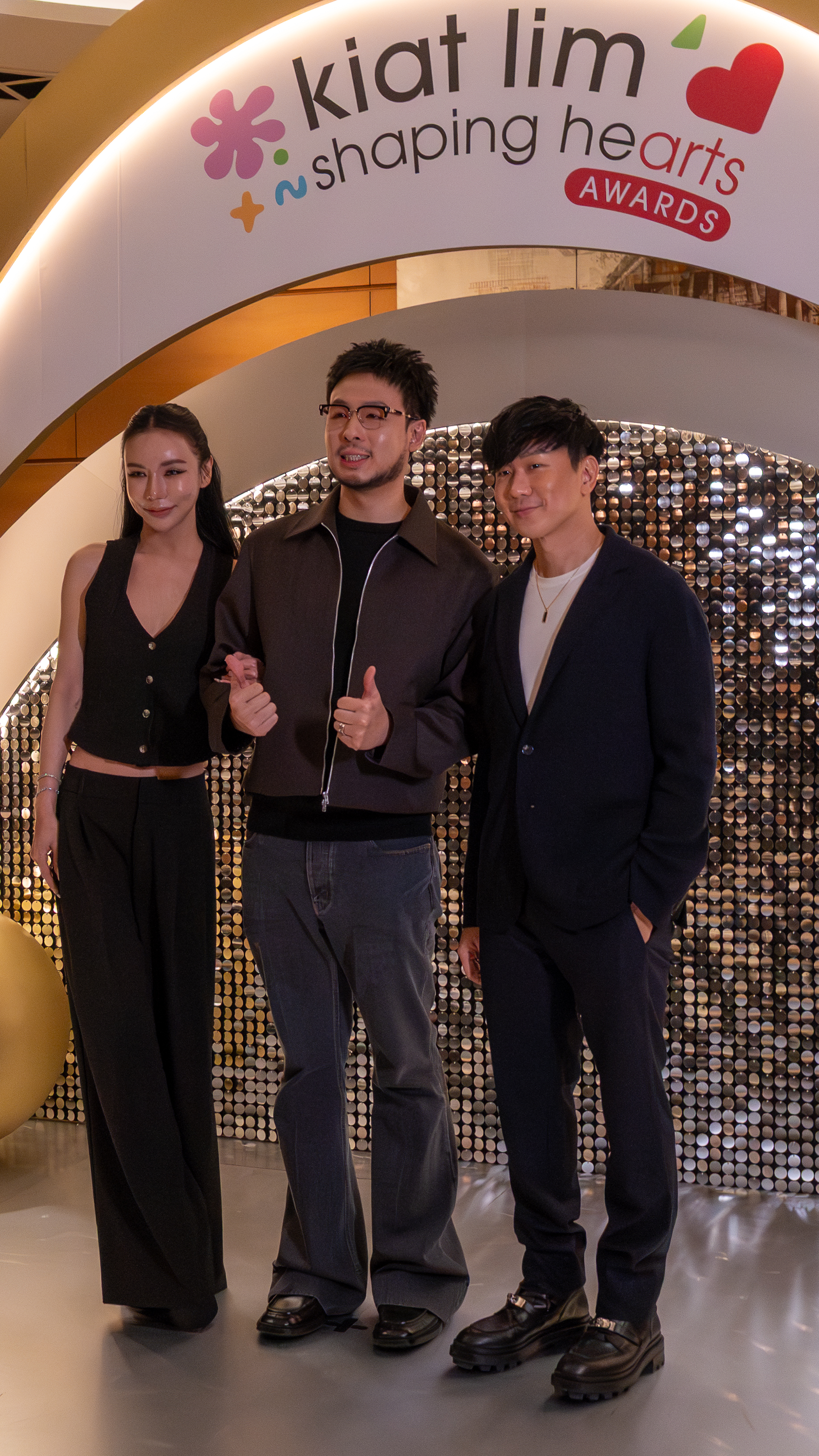
Kiat Lim (centre), Lin (right) at Shaping Hearts 2025 Award ceremony

Lin has appeared in various advertisements for brands such as Sprite, Dota 2, Beats and Cornetto Royale. He is also a tourist ambassador for Singapore, and an IP Ambassador for the Intellectual Property Office of Singapore in 2012. On 14 August 2015, Lin was selected to be the advisor for Team Harlem Yu on The Voice of China (season 4). On 4 November 2016, Lin joined the variety show "Dream Voice" as one of the mentors alongside A-Mei, Jam Hsiao, Hebe Tian, and Yu Quan. He stayed on as a mentor for the second season of the show, which was released in October 2017, and the third season, which was released in October 2018.

In 2019, he took part in the Chinese food travelogue show Chef Nic. On 24 February 2021, Lin performed a medley of songs ("A Whole New World", "Can You Feel the Love Tonight", "Let It Go" and "Embark") to commemorate the official launch of the digital streaming service Disney+ in Singapore, which launched a day earlier on the 23rd.

=== Business career ===
In 2017, Lin launched his business career. He established Team Still Moving under Gunfire (Team SMG), a professional esports team. Initially focused on Arena of Valor, Team SMG has expanded itself into other games such as PlayerUnknown's Battlegrounds in 2018, Mobile Legends: Bang Bang in 2020 and Dota 2 in 2021.

In July 2022, Lin said he is collaborating with Kiat Lim, son of Singaporean billionaire Peter Lim, and Elroy Cheo, a scion of the Cheo family that owns edible oils firm Mewah International, to co-found ARC, an app-based digital community that authenticates member profiles with non-fungible tokens (NFTs). Beginning 30 September 2022, Lin ran his pop-up café Miracle Coffee at the outdoor rain oculus of ArtScience Museum. It was also announced that a flagship outlet of Miracle Coffee was expected to be opened at the museum's lobby in 2023.

== Personal life ==
In July 2025, while performing in Beijing on the final leg of his concert JJ20 Final Lap, Lin announced on stage that he had been diagnosed with a heart condition in April 2024, and has been taking medication daily since.

== Discography ==
- Music Voyager (2003)
- Haven (2004)
- No. 89757 (2005)
- Cao Cao (2006)
- Westside (2007)
- Sixology (2008)
- Hundred Days (2009)
- She Says (2010)
- Lost N Found (2011)
- Stories Untold (2013)
- Genesis (2014)
- From M.E. to Myself (2015)
- Message in a Bottle (2017)
- Drifter / Like You Do (2020)
- Happily, Painfully After (2023)

== Filmography ==
=== Films ===
Year	Title	Role	Notes	Ref.
2007	Legend of the Sea (东海战)	Little Dragon Price	Voiceover; also composed and performed theme song "自由不变"	
2015	The Wonderful Wedding	Himself	Cameo	
2016	The Secret	Jimmy	Also composed and performed theme song "只要有你的地方"	

=== Television series ===
Year	Title	Role	Ref.
2006	Hanazakarino Kimitachihe	Lu Jingxi	
2008	Pretty Ugly (原來我不帥)	Zhuang Junwei	

=== Reality and variety shows ===
Year	Title	Notes	Ref.
2016	Sound of My Dream	Judge	
2017	Sound of My Dream 2	Judge	
2018	Sound of My Dream 3	Judge	

== Tours ==
- Just JJ World Tour (2006–2007)
- I Am World Tour (2010–2011)
- Timeline World Tour (2013–2015)
- Sanctuary World Tour (2018–2019)
- JJ20 World Tour (2022–2025)

== Awards and nominations ==
Year	Award	Category	Nominated work	Result	Ref.
2003	Singapore Hit Awards	Best New Artist (Gold)	—N/a	Won	
2004	15th Golden Melody Awards	Best New Artist	Music Voyager	Won	
2005	Singapore Hit Awards	Best Local Male Singer	—N/a	Won	
2005	Singapore Hit Awards	Best Singer-Songwriter	—N/a	Won	
2005	Singapore Hit Awards	Best Performing Male Singer	—N/a	Won	
2005	Singapore Hit Awards	Best Local Composition	"A Thousand Years Later" from No. 89757	Won	
2005	Singapore Hit Awards	Best Local Composition	"No. 89757" from No. 89757	Won	
2006	Compass Awards	Best Local Youth Songwriter	—N/a	Won	
2007	Compass Awards	Best Local Singer	—N/a	Won	
2007	Compass Awards	Best Local Film Song	"Summer Breeze" (feat. Kym) from No. 89757	Won	
2007	Beijing Pop Music Ceremony	Best Stage Performance		Won	
2007	Singapore Hit Awards	Best Local Singer	Westside	Won	
2008	Compass Awards	Best Local Songwriter	—N/a	Won	
2009	Compass Awards	Best Local Songwriter	—N/a	Won	
2009	Compass Awards	Best Local Singer	—N/a	Won	
2009	Compass Awards	Best Local Film Song	"Freedom" from Westside	Won	
2009	Singapore Hit Awards	Best Local Singer	—N/a	Won	
2010	21st Golden Melody Awards	Best Mandarin Male Singer	Hundred Days	Nominated	
2010	Compass Awards	Best Local Singer	—N/a	Won	
2010	Compass Awards	Best Local Songwriter	—N/a	Won	
2011	22nd Golden Melody Awards	Best Mandarin Male Singer	She Says	Nominated	
2014	2014 Mnet Asian Music Awards	Best Asian Artist	—N/a	Won	
2014	25th Golden Melody Awards	Best Mandarin Male Singer	Stories Untold	Won	
2014	Compass Awards	Best Local Singer	—N/a	Won	
2014	Compass Awards	Best Local Songwriter	—N/a	Won	
2015	26th Golden Melody Awards	Best Composer	"Listen Up" from Rice & Shine by Eason Chan	Nominated	
2015	26th Golden Melody Awards	Best Single Producer	"Listen Up" from Rice & Shine by Eason Chan	Nominated	
2016	27th Golden Melody Awards	Song of the Year	"Twilight" from From M.E. to Myself	Nominated	
2016	27th Golden Melody Awards	Best Music Video	"I Am Alive" (feat. Jason Mraz) from Genesis	Nominated	
2016	27th Golden Melody Awards	Best Album Producer	From M.E. to Myself	Nominated	
2016	27th Golden Melody Awards	Best Composer	"Twilight" from From M.E. to Myself	Won	
2016	27th Golden Melody Awards	Best Mandarin Male Singer	From M.E. to Myself	Won	
2016	2016 Mnet Asian Music Awards	Best Asian Artist	—N/a	Won	
2018	29th Golden Melody Awards	Album of the Year	Message in a Bottle	Nominated	
2018	29th Golden Melody Awards	Best Album Producer	Message in a Bottle	Nominated	
2018	29th Golden Melody Awards	Best Male Vocalist – Mandarin	Message in a Bottle	Nominated	
2018	29th Golden Melody Awards	Best Album in Mandarin	Message in a Bottle	Nominated	
2018	29th Golden Melody Awards	Song of the Year	"Little Big Us" (from Message in a Bottle)	Nominated	
2018	29th Golden Melody Awards	Best Composer	"Little Big Us" (from Message in a Bottle)	Nominated	
2018	2018 Mnet Asian Music Awards	Best Asian Artist	—N/a	Won	
2021	32nd Golden Melody Awards	Best Male Vocalist – Mandarin	Drifter / Like You Do	Nominated	
