= Little Big Us =

Single by JJ Lin

from the album Message in a Bottle
- Released: 25 November 2017
- Genre: Mandopop
- Composer(s): JJ Lin
- Lyricist(s): Xiaohan
- Producer(s): JJ Lin

JJ Lin singles chronology
"The Key" (2015)	"Little Big Us" (2017)	"Message in a Bottle" (2017)

Music video
- "Little Big Us" on YouTube

"Little Big Us" (Chinese: 偉大的渺小; pinyin: Wěidà de miǎoxiǎo) is a song by Singaporean singer-songwriter JJ Lin, serving as the lead single for his thirteenth studio album Message in a Bottle. Composed by JJ Lin and written by lyricist Xiaohan, the song was released on 25 November 2017.

"Little Big Us" peaked at number one on the Billboard Radio China Top 10 Chart and was named the most popular song of the year in Taiwan by Hit FM. At the 29th Golden Melody Awards, "Little Big Us" was shortlisted for the Song of the Year award while JJ Lin was shortlisted for Best Songwriter. An English version of "Little Big Us", titled "Until the Day", was included on the track list of Message in a Bottle.

== Music video ==
On 14 December 2017, the music video for "Little Big Us", directed by Chen Yin-jung, premiered. It tells the story of four lost urbanites, capturing the essence of the album's conceptual microfilm, The Road Home, and dissecting the state of mind of the four characters in the film, who seem to be from different backgrounds, but have the same essence. The film tries to find the essence of love, the road home, and return the heart to its purest and simplest state.

== Live performances ==
On 25 November 2017, JJ Lin sang for the first time at the 54th Golden Horse Awards, reinterpreting the classic "Cinema City" film songs and premiering his new song "Little Big Us", which is dedicated to all the film workers who bravely follow their dreams. On 30 December 2017, Lin performed "Little Big Us" at the 2018 New Year's Eve Concert of the Zhejiang Television China. During the 2018 New Year's Eve Concert, "Little Big Us" was sung as the opening of the event.

== Commercial performance ==
"Little Big Us" was released to receive top airplay on KKBOX, iTunes and other platforms, earned the No. 7 spot on the 2018 KKBOX China Top 100 Singles of the Year, with 811,705 albums sold and $445,435 in album revenue as of 15 June 2023. "Little Big Us" ranked number one on the 2017 Hit FM Top 100 Singles of the Year chart.

== Accolades ==
Awards and nominations
Year	Unit	Award	Result	Ref.
2018	The 29th Golden Melody Awards	Song of the Year Award	Nominated	
2018	The 29th Golden Melody Awards	Best Songwriter Award	Nominated	
2018	Hito Music Awards	Top 100 Singles of the Year	Won	
2018	Hito Music Awards	Top 10 Chinese Songs of the Year	Won	
2018	Canadian Chinese Pop Music Awards	HIT Top Ten Mandarin Songs of the Year	Won	
2018	Global Chinese Songs Chart	Golden Song of the Year	Won	
2018	Chinese Musicians Exchange Association	Top 10 Singles of the Year	Won	
2019	Pop Music All Gold Chart	Top 20 Golden Hits of the Year	Won	
2019	Pop Music All Gold Chart	Radio Spotlight Champion	Won	

== Charts ==
Chart performance for "Little Big Us"
Chart (2017)	Peak position
China Airplay (Billboard Radio)	1
