= A-do =

Singaporean singer (born 1973)

- Born: Du Chengyi (杜成義); 11 March 1973 (age 53); Singapore
- Years active: 2002–present
- Spouse: Lai Weili (赖玮莉) (m. 2016)
- Children: 1
- Relatives: Kenny Khoo (nephew)
- Musical career
- Genre: Mandopop
- Labels: Ocean Butterflies; Yuehua Entertainment; Seed Music

Du Chengyi, (Note: simplified Chinese: 杜成义; traditional Chinese: 杜成義; pinyin: Dù Chéngyì) known professionally as A-do (阿杜; Pe̍h-ōe-jī: A-tō͘), is a Singaporean singer.

== Career ==
Du was a construction foreman before being spotted by Singaporean producer Billy Koh in his company's talent search and was signed to Ocean Butterflies Music. He released his debut album in 2002.

In 2012, Du left showbiz due to panic disorder.

Du originally planned to release an album in 2015, but the album was delayed due to his mother's illness.

In 2018, Du returned to showbiz with a new album, I Will Not Hide.

In 2022, Du joined Singapore media company 8028 Holdings.

== Personal life ==
Du married Lai Weili (賴瑋莉; Pe̍h-ōe-jī: Lōa Úi-lī) in January 2016. They dated before Du became a singer for 7 years. They re-established their relationship when Du was diagnosed with panic disorder. They had a child in May 2016.

When Du returned to the media in 2018, he was criticized by fans for gaining weight. Du, in interviews, clarified that his weight gain was caused by his medications for treating panic disorder.

His nephew, Kenny Khoo, has also been a singer since 2014.

== Discography ==
=== Studio albums ===
| Date of release | Title | Ref. |
|---|---|---|
| 30 May 2002 | Night Fall | |
| 4 December 2002 | Persevering | |
| 23 December 2003 | Hello | |
| 21 December 2005 | I...Do | |
| 8 January 2008 | Do The Best | |
| 26 February 2010 | Fear No More | |
| 25 May 2012 | Ninth Time in Love | |
| 10 November 2018 | I Will Not Hide | |

=== Singles ===
| Year | Title | Notes/Ref. |
|---|---|---|
| 2017 | "Thousand Years Promise 一諾千年" | |
| 2017 | "Too Good Man 爛好人" | |
| 2021 | For the Sake of Love | |

== Awards and nominations ==
| Year | Award | Category | Result |
|---|---|---|---|
| 2002 | Singapore Hit Awards | Best New Act (Gold) | Won |
| 2003 | Singapore Hit Awards | Best Local Artiste | Won |
