= Message in a Bottle (album) =

Studio album by JJ Lin
- Released: 29 December 2017
- Recorded: 2017
- Genre: Mandopop
- Length: 47:01
- Label: Warner

JJ Lin chronology
From M.E. to Myself (2015)	Message in a Bottle (2017)	Drifter / Like You Do (2020)

Alternative cover

Singles from Message in a Bottle
- 1. "Little Big Us" Released: 25 November 2017; 2. "Message in a Bottle" Released: 29 December 2017

Message in a Bottle (simplified Chinese: 伟大的渺小; traditional Chinese: 偉大的渺小) is the thirteenth studio album by Singaporean singer JJ Lin, released on 29 December 2017 by Warner Music Taiwan.

== Track listing ==
All music is composed by JJ Lin

No.	Title	Lyrics	Length
1.	"聖所" (Sanctuary)	Teoh Sze'er （張思爾）	3:50
2.	"偉大的渺小" (Little Big Us)	Xiaohan （小寒）	4:38
3.	"穿越" (Stay)	Lin Yuguo （林雨果）	4:38
4.	"四點四十四" (Shadows)	Harry Chang （張懷秋）	3:47
5.	"我繼續" (Eagle's Eye)	Vincent Fang （方文山）	4:41
6.	"剪雲者" (Paper Clouds)	Kevin Yi （易家揚）	3:36
7.	"黑夜問白天" (53 Dawns)	Kevin Yi （易家揚）	4:52
8.	"丹寧執著 feat. MOE" (Own The Day)	Chou Hsinting （周信廷）	4:13
9.	"身為風帆" (Destiny)	Daryl Yao （姚若龍）	3:58
10.	"小瓶子" (Message in a bottle)	JJ Lin, Yvonne Lin （林怡鳳）	4:13
11.	"Until The Day"	JJ Lin	4:35
Total length:			47:01

== Charts ==
=== Weekly charts ===
Chart (2018)	Peak position
Hong Kong Albums (HKRMA)	3

=== Year-end charts ===
Chart (2017)	Position
Taiwanese Albums (Note: Best-selling albums of the year in Taiwan as reported by media outlets)	1

== Certifications ==
Region	Certification	Certified units/sales
Singapore (RIAS)	Gold	5,000^{*}
^{*} Sales figures based on certification alone.
