= Rynn Lim =

Malaysian musician

Rynn Lim Yu Zhong (林宇中)
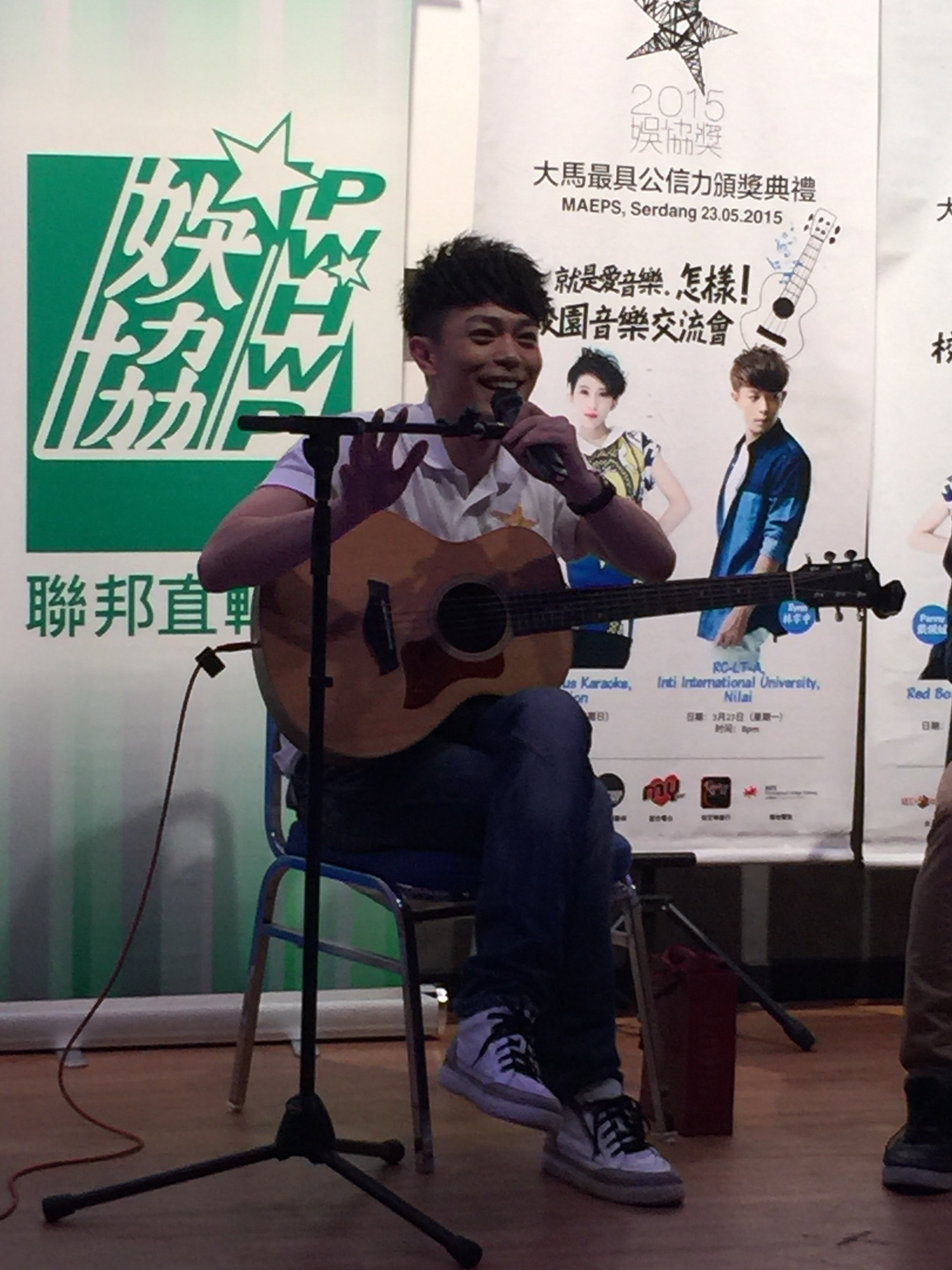
- Musical career
- Origin: Kuching, Sarawak, Malaysia
- Genres: Mandopop
- Occupations: Singer, song writer, music producer, actor
- Years active: Since 2006
- Label: Ocean Butterflies

Chinese name
- Chinese: 林宇中
Transcriptions
Standard Mandarin
- Hanyu Pinyin: Lín Yǔ Zhōng
Yue: Cantonese
- Jyutping: Lam4 Jyu5 Zung1
Southern Min
- Hokkien POJ: Lîm Ú-tiong

Rynn Lim Yu Zhong (Chinese: 林宇中; pinyin: Lǐn Yuzhōng; Jyutping: Lam4 Jyu5 Zung1; Pe̍h-ōe-jī: Lîm Ú-tiong) is a Malaysian singer and actor. He acted various roles in dramas from Malaysia, Singapore, China and Taiwan. He also once in a first collaboration drama of Malaysia Media Prima Berhad and Singapore MediaCorp Studios Pte Ltd.

== Album ==
- 2005 – 个人首张专辑 Ge Ren Shou Zhang Zhuan Ji (1st)
- 2007 – 淋雨中 Lin Yu Zhong (In The Rain)
- 2008 – 干物世界 Gan Wu Shi Jie (Homely Life)
- 2009 – All About Rynn 新歌 + 自选集
- 2010 – 新娘 Xin Niang (Dearest Bride)
- 2014 – 捨得 She De (Give & Take)

== Awards ==
- 2006 – Best Newcomer at the 17th Golden Melody Awards (Taiwan)
- 2006 – Most Popular New Artiste in the 6th Global Chinese Song Festival Awards
- 2006 – Most Popular K-song Award (Bronze) for 《靠岸》 (Kao An) in the Malaysia 2006 Entertainment Awards
- 2006 – Top 10 International Original Composition for 《靠岸》 (Kao An) in the Malaysia 2006 Entertainment Awards
- 2006 – Top 10 Local Original Composition for 《失恋学》 (Shi Lian Xue) in the Malaysia 2006 Entertainment Awards
- 2006 – Golden Award for Best New Artiste in the Malaysia 2006 Entertainment Awards

== Acting career ==
Year	Drama	Role	Notes
2006	The Beginning 原点	Tie Dongliang (Tietou)	A collaboration of Media Pima Berhad and MediaCorp Studios Pte Ltd
2007	Smile For Me 十分笑容	Yu Zhong (宇中)	Jointly presented by Astro AEC and Sony Cybershot, directed by Hor Chee Leong
2008	Pretty Ugly 原来我不帅	庄俊仁 (Cameo)	
2009	Yes Sir! 高校铁金刚	铁金刚	
2009	The Adjuster 稽查专用	Andy	
2011	The Adjuster 2 稽查专用 2	Andy	
2014	The Four Scholars in Jiangnan 江南四大才子	冯小七	
2015	The Precedents 法内情	Liao Cheng Hui 寥承辉	
2016	Pulse Of Life 脉动人心		
2016	If Only I Could 十年...你还好吗?	Lin Sen 林森	
2018	My Nyonya Sensei 娘惹相思格	孟江鸿	
