= Ocean Butterflies =

Asian music and entertainment company

Ocean Butterflies Music
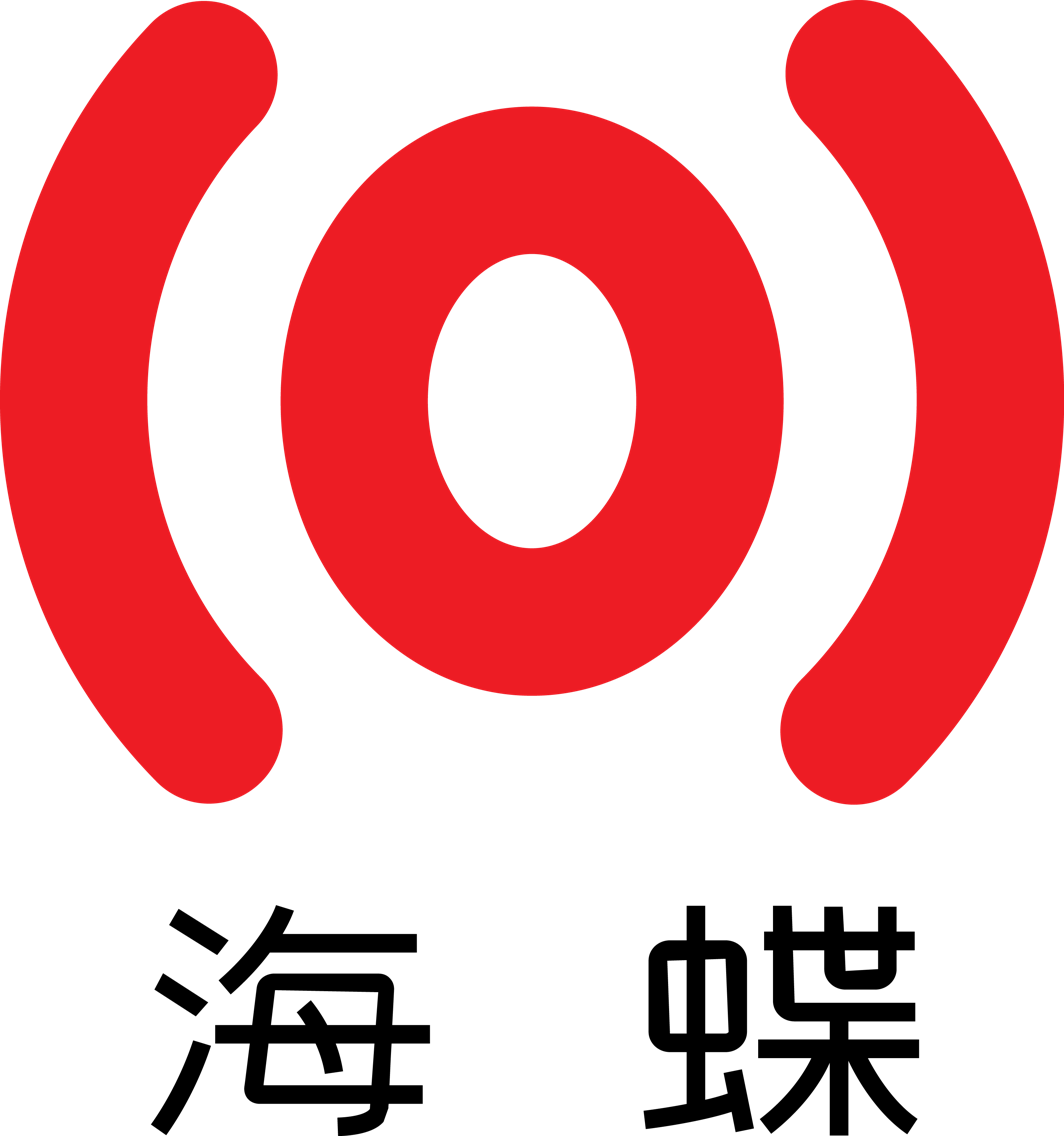
- Native name: 海蝶音樂 (海蝶音乐)
- Type: Music label, Music Publishing & entertainment company
- Industry: Music and entertainment business
- Founded: 1986
- Founder: Billy Koh, Colin Goh, Ng Guan Seng, Koh Nam Seng and Teo Kay Kiong
- Headquarters: Beijing, China
- Area served: Singapore, Taiwan, Malaysia, Hong Kong, Mainland China
- Key people: Billy Koh (Founder and CEO); Benson Liu (COO); Colin Goh (Founder and Singapore Managing Director); Benny Bi (President of China); Eric Lin (Share Holder); Dixon Oi (Malaysia Managing Director); Ken Lim (Taiwan General Manager); Ivy Peh (Touch Music Publishing General Manager)
- Products: Music labels, Music Publishing & artist training, events
- Revenue: 30,000,000 USD
- Number of employees: 120
- Website: obmusic.com.sg en.taihe.com/grouppro/2

Ocean Butterflies Music (Chinese: 海蝶音樂) is an independent Asian music and entertainment company specializing in Chinese-Pop (C-pop). Founded in 1986, it operates in six regions: Mainland China, Taiwan, Hong Kong, Singapore and Malaysia.

== History ==
In 1986, Ocean Butterflies was founded in Singapore as Ocean Butterflies Production Pte Ltd. In 1990, Ocean Butterflies expanded into music production and in record and singles production for artists from Taiwan, Hong Kong and Malaysia.

In 1993, Ocean Butterflies launched Kit Chan with her first album, Do Not Destroy The Harmony.

Billy Koh spotted A-do, a construction foreman during a talent search and signed him to Ocean Butterflies Music. A-do released his debut album in 2002.

In 2002, Ocean Butterflies signed JJ Lin after he completed his National Service and launched his debut album in 2003.

In 2007, International Data Group, Susquehanna International Group and Accel Partners invested in the company to set up Ocean Butterflies International. Ocean Butterflies signed Hong Junyang, the runner-up in the male category of Project SuperStar 2005.

In 2011, Ocean Butterflies held a 25th Anniversary Concert, These Are Our Songs.

In 2014, chief executive officer Koh quit Ocean Butterflies to set up Amusic Rights Management. Ocean Butterflies signed former Campus SuperStar season 2's contestant Stella Seah.

In 2015, Ocean Butterflies was acquired by Taihe Music Group from China.

== Enterprises ==
Ocean Butterflies International comprises 5 major enterprises:

- Ocean Butterflies Music: music label, artiste management, music production, concert organizer, marketing and distribution network
- Touch Music Publishing: administrates worldwide songs and songwriters
- Ocean Butterflies Technology: on-line, mobile digital music platform, digital/mobile distribution and licensing network.
- Music Forest: music schools and artist training in C-pop market in Singapore, Malaysia and mainland China.
- Ocean Butterflies Communications: product branding, marketing and event organization

== Touch Music Publishing ==
Touch Music Publishing oversees the administration and licensing of songs for Ocean Butterflies Music. In 2011 Touch Music Publishing began licensing production music outside of its pop music catalogue. Touch Music Publishing is a member of MPS and Composers & Authors Society of Singapore.

== Artists ==
Current

- Stella Seah

Former

- A-do
- JJ Lin
- Kit Chan
- Rynn Lim
