= Stefanie Sun discography =

Songs of Stefanie Sun

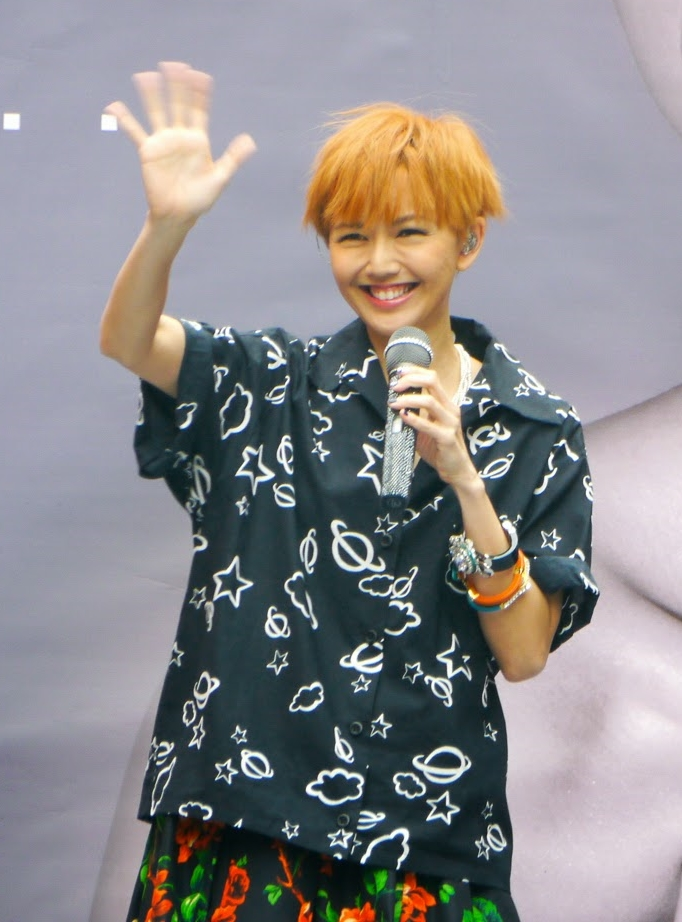
- Sun in 2014
- Studio albums: 12
- EPs: 1
- Compilation albums: 2
- Live albums: 3

The discography of Singaporean singer Stefanie Sun consists of 12 studio albums, 1 extended play, 2 compilation albums, and over 3 live albums. Five of her albums have sold over 1,000,000 copies in China, while her seventh studio album, Stefanie (2004), sold over 2,200,000 copies throughout Asia. Sun has sold over 30 million copies of her albums during her career.

== Studio albums ==
List of studio albums, with release date, label, and sales shown
Title	Album details	Peak chart positions		Sales	Certifications
Title	Album details	SGP	TWN	Sales	Certifications
Yan Zi	Released: 9 June 2000; Label: Warner Music; Formats: CD, cassette, LP, XRCD	—	—	TWN: 330,000; CHN: 200,000; SGP: 17,000; MLY: 12,000; HK: 12,000	RIAS: Platinum
My Desired Happiness	Released: 9 December 2000; Label: Warner Music; Formats: CD, cassette, LP	—	—	TWN: 400,000; CHN: 1,000,000	
Kite	Released: 12 July 2001; Label: Warner Music; Formats: CD, cassette, LP, XRCD	—	—	TWN: 300,000	
Start	Released: 5 January 2002; Label: Warner Music; Formats: CD, cassette, LP	1	—	TWN: 260,000; CHN: 1,000,000	
Leave	Released: 21 May 2002; Label: Warner Music; Formats: CD, cassette, IVD, LP	1	—	TWN: 250,000; CHN: 1,000,000	
To Be Continued...	Released: 10 January 2003; Label: Warner Music; Formats: CD, cassette, LP, download	2	—	TWN: 280,000; CHN: 1,000,000	
Stefanie	Released: 29 October 2004; Label: Warner Music; Formats: CD, cassette, LP, download	1	—	Asia: 2,200,000; TWN: 180,000	
A Perfect Day	Released: 7 October 2005; Label: Warner Music; Formats: CD, cassette, LP, download	—	1	Asia: 1,000,000; TWN: 100,000	
Against the Light	Released: 22 March 2007; Label: Capitol Records; Formats: CD, cassette, digital download	—	1	Asia: 1,000,000; CHN: 500,000; TWN: 100,000	
It's Time	Released: 8 March 2011; Label: Wonderful Music; Formats: CD, digital download	—	1	TWN: 85,000	
Kepler	Released: 27 February 2014; Label: Universal Music; Formats: CD, digital download, LP	—	1		
No. 13 – A Dancing Van Gogh	Released: 9 November 2017; Label: Universal Music; Formats: CD, digital download, LP	—	—		

== Compilation albums ==
Title	Album details	Peak chart positions		Sales
Title	Album details	MLY	TWN	Sales
The Moment	Released: 22 August 2003; Label: Warner Music; Formats: CD, cassette	1	—	Asia: 1,500,000; TWN: 257,000
My Story, Your Song	Released: 22 September 2006; Label: Warner Music; Formats: CD, digital download, LP	—	1	

== Extended plays ==
Title	Album details
Rainbow Bot	Released: 19 August 2016; Label: Universal Music; Formats: Digital download, streaming

== Live albums ==
Title	Album details
2000 Live Concert	Released: 7 June 2001; Label: Warner Music; Formats: CD
Start World Tour	Released: 20 September 2002; Label: Warner Music; Formats: CD, DVD
Hung Hom 2005 Hong Kong Concert	Released: 20 January 2006; Label: Warner Music; Formats: CD, DVD

== Singles ==
Title	Year	Album
"Cloudy Day" (天黑黑)	2000	Yan Zi
"Love Document" (愛情證書)	2000	Yan Zi
"Realize" (開始懂了)	2000	My Desired Happiness
"My Desired Happiness" (我要的幸福)	2000	My Desired Happiness
"Green Light" (綠光)	2001	Kite
"Abscondence" (逃亡)	2001	Kite
"We Will Get There"	2002	Leave
"I Am Fine" (我不難過)	2003	To Be Continued...
"Encounter" (遇見)	2003	The Moment
"I Miss Him, Too" (我也很想他)	2004	Stefanie
"My Love" (我的愛)	2004	Stefanie
"Someone Like Me" (同類)	2004	Stefanie
"Poems & Tears" (眼淚成詩)	2005	A Perfect Day
"First Day" (第一天)	2005	A Perfect Day
"What I Miss" (我懷念的)	2007	Against the Light
"Against the Light" (逆光)	2007	Against the Light
"Muttering" (咕嘰咕嘰)	2007	Against the Light
"Time and Tide" (當冬夜漸暖)	2011	It's Time
"Fool's Kingdom" (愚人的國度)	2011	It's Time
"Kepler" (克卜勒)	2014	Kepler
"Best Days of My Youth" (尚好的青春)	2014	Kepler
"Angel's Fingerprints" (天使的指紋)	2014	Kepler
"Radio"	2015	Non-album single
"Ban Ju Zai Jian" (半句再見)	2016	At Café 6 OST
"A Dancing Van Gogh" (跳舞的梵谷)	2017	No. 13 – A Dancing Van Gogh
"A State of Bliss" (我很愉快)	2017	No. 13 – A Dancing Van Gogh
"Windbreaker" (風衣)	2017	No. 13 – A Dancing Van Gogh
"Eternal Love" (守護永恆的愛)	2019	Non-album singles
"What Remains" (餘額)	2021	Non-album singles
"Viva Anon" (匿名萬歲)	2021	Non-album singles
"The Day Before" (世界終結前一天)	2021	Non-album singles
"Capturing the Light" (擒光)	2022	Non-album singles
"Appearance" (樣子)	2024	Love Endures (要久久愛) OST
"After the Last" (最后之后)	2024	Honor of Kings OST
"Afterwards"	2025	Non-album single
