= The Moment (Stefanie Sun album) =

Compilation album by Stefanie Sun
- Released: 22 August 2003
- Recorded: 1999–2003
- Genre: Mandopop
- Language: Chinese
- Label: Warner
- Producer: Peter Lee; Kenn C; Stefanie Sun; Weizhen Chen

Stefanie Sun chronology
To Be Continued... (2003)	The Moment (2003)	Stefanie (2004)

The Moment is the first greatest hits album by Singaporean singer Stefanie Sun. It was released throughout Greater China on 22 August 2003, by Warner Music Taiwan. The album contains seven new songs and fifteen songs from her previous albums. It contains 22 songs in total and is produced by Peter Lee, Kenn C, Stefanie Sun and Weizhen Chen.

The album sold more than 1.5 million copies in Asia. On the first day of the album's official release, 200,000 copies were sold in Taiwan. By the end of 2003, it was reported that The Moment had sold 257,000 copies in Taiwan, making it the 7th highest selling album of the year in the country. Shortly after the release of The Moment, Sun publicly announced that she would "take a break" from the music industry for about a year.

== Background and release ==
After graduating from Nanyang Technological University, Sun signed a recording contract with Warner Music, through which she later released six studio albums—Yan Zi (2000), My Desired Happiness (2000), Kite (2001), Start (2002), Leave (2002) and To Be Continued... (2003). The six albums have sold more than 330,000, 400,000, 300,000, 260,000, 250,000, and 270,000 copies in Taiwan, respectively.

The Moment is the summary of the first stage of Sun's musical journey, and it is also a musical commemorative work that Warner Records wanted to leave behind for Sun before taking a leave of absence. The album contains 5 original songs that had not been released before: "The Moment," "Encounter," "Does Not Bother," "Can't Be with You" and "Under the Sun"; which brought together songwriters from Taiwan, Hong Kong, and Singapore. The album also contains 15 “key songs” selected from Sun's 6 albums that were released during the three years since her debut.

== Title and artwork ==
The title of the album The Moment was explained as:

What is a critical moment in life?

It is a decision; it is a choice; whether to go left or right; whether to continue or give up; it is the moment to say goodbye to the past; it is the moment to bravely wipe the wound; it is The moment when you decide your future. What is Stefanie Sun’s pivotal moment?

Stefanie Sun, The Moment.

For the album look, stylist Fang Qilun chose simple white and simple styles for Stefanie Sun. For the album photography, photographer Huang Zhongping captured Sun’s multi-faceted emotions through simple studio shots, highlighting Sun’s deepest emotions.

== Writing and recording ==
Among the original works of the album The Moment, the title track tells the story of Sun's desire to have the free space of being a non-public figure, her inner choices and review of the past when she is at a decisive moment. "Encounter" is the theme song of the movie Turn Left, Turn Right, and the lyrics are specially designed according to the plot of the movie. Lyrically, "Encounter" is about emotions; you can't know but you know how to cherish. "Does Not Bother" is a lively number that expresses Sun's attitude towards life. "Can't Be With You" is a song about longing for a lost relationship and helplessness. "Under the Sun" informs teenagers and reminds them of the power of self-awareness and positive action. The song "Tonight, I Feel Close To You" was a collaboration with Japanese singer Mai Kuraki. The songs was also included in Kuraki's 2003 album If I Believe.

== Release and promotion ==
On 5 August 2003, Warner Records announced that Sun would release her first greatest hits album titled The Moment simultaneously across Asia on 22 August 2003. The Moment was packaged as a double-disc album. The first CD contains five brand new songs; the second CD contains fifteen old songs that have had a special meaning to Sun since her debut, and the deluxe edition of the album comes with a bonus VCD containing a 50-minute documentary entitled "Sun Yanzi The Moment." Before the official release of the album, a pre-order campaign was held, where pre-orderers could download the new song "A Sky Full Of Dreams," which was not yet included in the CD, from Warner Records' official website with an exclusive download password. The deluxe version of the album comes with a free video disc titled "Sun Yan Zi The Moment."

The song "Encounter" was used as the theme song of 2003 joint Hong Kong-Singaporean film Turn Left, Turn Right. "Under the Sun" served as the 2003 Sun Project Theme Song. On 13 August 2003, Sun held a press conference in Taipei to promote the compilation album. On the evening of 15 August 2003, Sun held a concert to promote her album The Moment in Taipei. At the concert, she announced that she would take a one-year break from the music scene. Sun described her farewell performance as having "mixed emotions." She even said to the fans in the audience in a sentimental tone: "In the next year, I will be leaving the music industry temporarily. I need some time to settle down. After more than three years, thank you all." Faced with more than 30,000 spectators in the audience, Sun, who had vowed not to cry before, was finally moved to tears.

=== Singles and music videos ===
The music video for the song "The Moment" was directed by Wayne Peng. The video depicts Sun wearing a black dress while playing a grand piano in a plain white room.

The movie Turn Left, Turn Right plays the song "Encounter" when Gigi Leung and Takeshi Kaneshiro are sitting by the pond, one on each side with their backs to each other. The music video for "Encounter" was directed by Shockley Huang. The video still features Gigi Leung and Takeshi Kaneshiro in a beautiful love story, simplifying the movie's story of a pair of people who love each other, but are always missing out on life, and in the end the love ends without a trace. Shockley Huang also directed the music video for the song "Does Not Bother."

In January 2004, the tracks "Encounter" and "Tonight, I Feel Close To You" were listed at number 1 and number 53 respectively on the 2003 Hit FM Top 100 Singles of the Year chart.

== Accolades ==
The album earned an IFPI Hong Kong Top Sales Music Award for Top 10 Best Selling Mandarin Albums of the Year in 2003. The following year, in 2004, the song "Encounter" made it onto the leaderboard of the 4th Global Chinese Songs Ranking's Top 20 Songs. At the same ceremony, Chet Lam won the Best Composer of the Year Award.

== Track listing ==
CD1
No.	Title	Lyrics	Music	Arrangement	Length
1.	"這一刻" (The Moment)	Justin Chen	Justin Chen	Goh Kheng Long	4:12
2.	"遇見" (Encounter)	Kevin Yi	Chet Lam	Terence Teo	3:28
3.	"懶得去管" (Does Not Bother)	Shuo Hsiao	Chen Weigang	Eric Ng	4:04
4.	"不能和你一起" (Can't Be With You)	Eric Chen	Eric Ng	Eric Ng	4:40
5.	"太陽底下" (Under The Sun)	Liao Yingru	Ronald Ng	Ronald Ng; Kenn C	3:25
6.	"全心全意" (One United People)	Wu Qingkang	Joshua Wan	Joshua Wan	2:52
7.	"One United People"	Joshua Wan	Joshua Wan	Joshua Wan	2:52

CD2
No.	Title	Lyrics	Music	Arrangement	Length
1.	"我要的幸福" (My Desired Happiness)	Matthew Yen	Paul Lee	Martin Tang	3:33
2.	"超快感" (Turbo)	Tino Bao; Francis Lee	Tino Bao	Anthony Bao	3:43
3.	"天黑黑" (Cloudy Day)	Liao Yingru; Wu Yizheng	Peter Lee	Goh Kheng Long	3:59
4.	"很好" (Fine)	Jennifer Hsu	Stefanie Sun	Goh Kheng Long	4:32
5.	"Someone"	Stefanie Sun	Stefanie Sun	Kenn C	3:23
6.	"風箏" (Kite)	Keven Yi	Paul Lee	Goh Kheng Long	4:34
7.	"任性" (Abandon)	He Qihong	Stefanie Sun	Goh Kheng Long	3:47
8.	"逃亡" (Abscondence)	Lin Yifen	Peter Lee	Kenn C	4:42
9.	"害怕" (Fear)	Arys Chien	Arys Chien	Arys Chien	4:02
10.	"永遠" (Forever)	Tu Kaizhi	Yang Junliang	Martin Tang	3:35
11.	"眼神" (Wink)	Daryl Yao	Stefanie Sun	Zhong Xingmin	3:30
12.	"橄欖樹" (Olive Tree)	Sanmao	Li Tai-hsiang	Kenn C	3:29
13.	"沒有人的方向" (A Direction Without Anyone)	Jacky Yang	Stefanie Sun; Peter Lee	Kenn C	4:07
14.	"真的" (Really)	Jennifer Hsu	Stefanie Sun	Anthony Bao	4:08
15.	"Tonight, I Feel Close To You" (feat. Mai Kuraki)	Mai Kuraki	Aika Ōno	Cybersound	4:08
