= List of best-selling albums in China =

This is a list of the best-selling albums in China.

As of 2023, China was the world's 5th largest music market, an increase from being 14th in 2015 and 27th in 2005.

== Best-selling albums in China ==
This is a list of the top 10 best-selling albums in China.

Legend
pink	Physical album
purple	Digital album

Year of release	Album	Artist	Number of copies sold	Ref.
2022	Greatest Works of Art (Note: The best-selling non-single release in China is Cai Xukun's Young (2019), which has sold more than 14 million copies. However, Young only consists of two tracks.)	Jay Chou	7,219,772	
2021	Epsilon	Liu Yuxin	5,878,671	
2019	Honey	Lay	4,858,957	
1993	The Goodbye Kiss	Jacky Cheung	4,000,000	
2019	Going to Powerfully Burst	R1SE	3,082,155	
2020	Lit	Lay	2,741,096	
2004	Common Jasmin Orange	Jay Chou	2,600,000	
1984	Wandering	Cheng Fangyuan	2,000,000	
1985	Childhood	Cheng Fangyuan	2,000,000	
1991	Red Sun	Various (honoring Mao Zedong)	2,000,000	
2016	Jay Chou's Bedtime Stories	Jay Chou	1,989,173	

== Best-selling physical albums ==
The following is a list of the best-selling physical albums in China, with album sales of over 500,000 units.

Year of release	Album	Artist	Number of copies sold	Ref.
1993	Kiss And Goodbye	Jacky Cheung	4,000,000	
2004	Common Jasmin Orange	Jay Chou	2,600,000	
1984	Wandering	Cheng Fangyuan	2,000,000	
1985	Childhood	Cheng Fangyuan	2,000,000	
1983	Su Rui	Su Rui	1,500,000	
—	By A Wrong Bus	Su Rui	1,500,000	
—	Wolf	Qi Qin	1,300,000	
1994	Nothing Will Stop Me From Loving You	Wakin Chau	1,200,000	
1994	The Lion King	Various artists	1,000,000	
1997	Titanic	James Horner/Celine Dion	1,000,000	
1986	A Voice on the Ocean	Fei Xiang	1,000,000	
1996	Too Softhearted	Richie Jen	1,000,000 (Note: It is claimed that the album sold 26 million copies including pirated copies, however, Jen himself stated in an interview that legitimate sales of the album were 1,000,000 copies in mainland China.)	
2002	Start	Stefanie Sun	1,000,000	
2003	To Be Continued...	Stefanie Sun	1,000,000	
1997	The Third Eye	Zheng Jun	800,000	
1994	Chi Luo	Zheng Jun	600,000	
1987	Bad	Michael Jackson	500,000	
2001	Meteor Rain	F4	500,000	
2007	Against the Light	Stefanie Sun	500,000	
2004	It's Raining	Rain	500,000	
1999	Next to Happiness	The Flowers	500,000	
	Qingchun Shijie	Hang Hong	500,000	

== List of best-selling digital albums (5 tracks or more) ==
Artist	Album	Year	Sales	Ref.
Jay Chou	Greatest Works of Art	2022	7,219,772	
Cai Xukun	Mi 迷	2021	3,473,680	
R1SE	Going to Powerfully Burst	2009	3,082,155	
Big Bang	Made	2016	2,841,614	
Lay	Lit	2020	2,741,096	
Jay Chou	Bedtime Stories	2013	2,000,890	
Taylor Swift	Lover	2019	1,872,460	
Li Yuchun	Wow	2019	1,858,647	
Hua Chenyu	New World	2020	1,835,069	
Taylor Swift	1989	2014	1,780,189	
Taylor Swift	Reputation	2017	1,741,210	
G-Dragon	Kwon Ji Yong	2017	1,507,570	
Blackpink	The Album	2020	1,432,666	
Nine Percent	To the Nines	2018	1,396,966	
Li Yuchun	Liu Xing	2017	1,243,109	
Taylor Swift	Folklore	2020	1,206,487	
Lay	Namanana	2018	1,180,208	
JJ Lin	Message in a Bottle	2017	1,173,263	
Lay	Lay 02 Sheep	2017	1,008,065	

== List of best-selling digital singles/EPs (4 tracks or less) ==
Artist	Single/EP	Year	Sales	Ref.
Xiao Zhan	Light	2020	54,255,539	
Hua Chenyu	I Really Want to Love This World	2019	22,931,648	
Jay Chou	Greatest Works of Art	2022	22,075,000^{[a]}	
Wang Yibo	No Feelings	2019	17,585,162	
Wang Yibo	The Rules of My World	2020	15,451,449	
Cai Xukun	Young	2019	14,505,045	
Jay Chou	Won't Cry	2019	10,917,586	
Jay Chou	Mojito	2020	9,170,315	
JJ Lin	No Turning Back	2020	6,855,776	
Liu Yuxin	Epsilon	2021	5,874,069	
Eason Chan	Keep Me By Your Side	2016	5,771,018	
Jay Chou	Cold Hearted	2022	5,700,000^{[a]}	
JJ Lin	The Story Of Us	2019	5,637,031	
JJ Lin	Dust and Ashes	2023	5,492,000^{[a]}	
Jay Chou	Still Wandering	2022	5,359,000^{[a]}	
Lay	Honey	2019	4,858,957	
Jay Chou	Pink Ocean	2022	4,569,000^{[a]}	
1K	Just Forget It	2022	4,206,000^{[a]}	
Jay Chou	Reflection	2022	4,110,000^{[a]}	
LBI	Summer in a Small Town	2022	4,071,000^{[a]}	
A Li Yue	When the Spring Breeze Blows	2022	3,999,000^{[a]}	
Runze Zheng	Moment	2023	3,999,000^{[a]}	
Jay Chou	You Are the Firework I Missed	2022	3,968,000^{[a]}	
Zhang Zhehan	Surround	2021	3,873,937	
Nanfang Kai	Parting Blossoms	2023	3,839,000^{[a]}	
Lu Han	Xplore	2016	3,664,318	
Cheng Huan	I Will Wait	2023	3,654,000^{[a]}	
Yuzhou Wang Leto & Qiao Juncheng	If the Moon Doesn't Come	2024	3,584,000^{[a]}	
LBI	Jumping Machine	2025	3,537,000^{[a]}	
Kekekea	The Girl Is Far Away	2023	3,525,000^{[a]}	
Lu Han	Π-volume.1	2019	3,477,798	
Miya	It's You	2022	3,430,000^{[a]}	
Li Yuchun	Ye (first EP of Growing Wild)	2016	3,418,553	
Young Captain & Hooleeger	11	2022	3,405,000^{[a]}	
Zhou Shen	Watch Ur Manners	2024	3,381,000^{[a]}	
Zhou Shen	Little Happiness	2024	3,379,000^{[a]}	
Lu Han	Reloaded	2015	3,358,873	
JJ Lin	Light of Sanctuary	2020	3,282,802	
Roy Wang	Song For You	2018	3,263,963	
Kris Wu	6	2017	3,215,357	
Zhou Shen	The Memory Store	2024	3,159,000^{[a]}	
Blackpink	How You Like That	2020	3,088,581	
Zhu Zhengting	The Winter Light	2019	3,078,866	
Zhou Shen	The Giver	2024	3,063,000^{[a]}	
Zhou Shen	Restart	2024	3,038,000^{[a]}	
Silence Wang	I Miss	2023	3,017,000^{[a]}	
Lu Han	π-volume.3	2020	3,009,225	

- a. Sales figure includes 'equivalent track streams'.

== See also ==
- Music of China
- Mandopop
- List of best-selling albums
- List of best-selling albums by country
