= Clarence Lee =

Clarence Lee may refer to:

- Clarence Lee (cricketer) (1890–1959), Australian cricketer
- Clarence Lee (make-up artist) (born 1973), Singaporean professional make-up artist
