= Nanjing Olympic Sports Centre =

Multi-sports stadium in Nanjing, Jiangsu, China

南京奥林匹克体育中心 Nanjing Olympic Sports Center
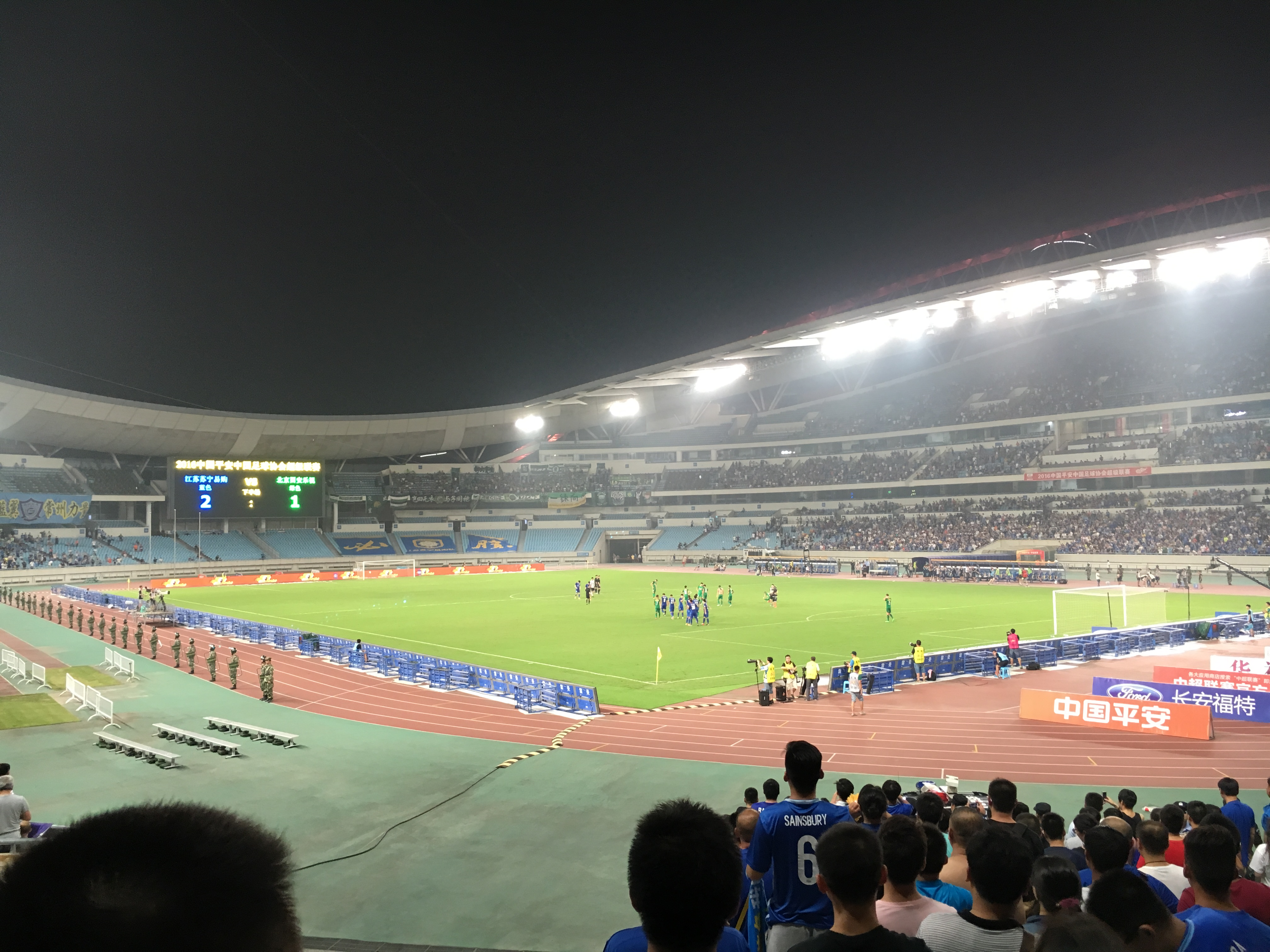
- Stadium interior in 2016
- Interactive map of 南京奥林匹克体育中心; Nanjing Olympic Sports Center
- Location: 222 Jiangdong Middle Rd, Jianye District, Nanjing, Jiangsu, China
- Coordinates: 32°0′38.31″N 118°43′10.92″E
- Owner: City of Nanjing
- Operator: Nanjing Olympic Sports Center Management Co. Ltd
- Capacity: 61,443 (stadium); 13,000 (arena)
- Surface: Grass
- Public transit: 10 Olympic Stadium; 2 Olympic Stadium East

Construction
- Built: January 28, 2002
- Opened: May 1, 2005
- Cost: 8.698 million RMB
- Architect: HOK Sport (now Populous)

Tenant
- Jiangsu (2007–2021)

Nanjing Olympic Sports Center Stadium (Chinese: 南京奥林匹克体育中心) is a multi-purpose stadium located in Hexi New Town, Nanjing, China. It is primarily used for football and athletics events and is the centerpiece of a larger Olympic Park complex which also includes the Nanjing Olympic Sports Center Gymnasium, an aquatics center, a tennis center, and other recreational sports venues.

Opened in 2005, it hosted the 2005 National Games of China and was a host stadium of the 2014 Summer Youth Olympics. It was formerly the home of Chinese Super League team Jiangsu F.C. until their dissolution in 2021.

== Stadium ==
The stadium was constructed at a cost of ¥8,698,000, with a total construction area of 136.34 thousand square meters. It offers seating for 61,443 spectators and is capable of hosting both sporting events and large-scale musical performances.

The roof features a hyperboloid design, while two red arches, slanted outward at a 45-degree angle, span 361.58 meters. The track was manufactured by the Italian company Mondo (蒙多), and the screens were created by the Belgian firm Barco, which include two displays located on the north and south sides. The screens cover a total area of 560 square meters, making them the largest in China.

The opening and closing ceremonies, track and field, and football matches of the 2005 National Games of China were hosted here.

== Arena ==
The arena spans approximately 6 million square meters, encompassing the sub-main hall and two sections of the museum. It provides seating for 13,000 spectators, with some seats designed to be dismantled and relocated to accommodate various competitions and events.

== Swimming pool ==
The swimming pool is in full compliance with FINA's construction standards and is nearly 3 million square meters. The pool has 4,000 seats and includes a swimming pool, diving pool, training pool, and paddling pool.

== Tennis center ==
The tennis center is nearly 4 million square meters, with 21 required standards in line with international competition venues requirements, and can accommodate 4,000 people, including a final venue for two of the semi-final venues to accommodate 2,000 people, 14 open-air games venues, and four indoor venues.

== Information technology center ==
The Information Technology Center building is approximately 23,000 square meters and is the Olympic Sports Center's management hub. The center can hold various types of events and activities, press releases, news delivery, and conduct business services. To the south of the News Center is a 100-meter-high elevator tower constructed for tourist purposes. The tower's viewing platform boasts views of the Olympic Sports Center, Hexi New Urban Area, and the nearby Riverview.

== Entertainment events ==
- S.H.E – Fantasy Land World Tour (November 12, 2005)
- Stefanie Sun – Stefanie Sun World Tour Concert (April 28, 2006)
- Jay Chou – The World Tour (April 19, 2008)
- FanFan - Love & FanFan world tour (October 27, 2012)
- Wang Feng – Peak Storm Super Tour (July 4, 2015)
- Jay Chou – The Invincible World Tour (May 20–21, 2017)
- Joker Xue – I Think I've Seen You Somewhere Tour (July 15, 2017)
- JJ Lin – Sanctuary World Tour (June 23, 2018)
- Joker Xue - Extraterrestrial World Tour (April 28-29, 2023)
- Hua Chenyu – 2023 Mars Concert Tour (October 21, 2023)
- JJ Lin – JJ20 World Tour (November 11–12, 2023)
- A-Mei – ASMR Max World Tour (May 11, 2024)
- Westlife — With Love Tour (May 24, 2024)
- G.E.M. – I Am Gloria World Tour (June 23–25, 2024)
- Silence Wang – 100,000 Volts Concert Tour (July 20–21, 2024)
- Zhou Shen – 9.29Hz Tour Concert (August 10–11, 2024)
- Joker Xue - The King of Beasts Tour (May 22-24, 29-31, 2026)

== See also ==
- List of football stadiums in China
- List of stadiums in China
- Lists of stadiums

Preceded by The Float@Marina Bay; Singapore	Summer Youth Olympics; Opening and Closing Ceremonies; 2014	Succeeded by Obelisco de Buenos Aires / Youth Olympic Village; Buenos Aires
