= List of Stefanie Sun concert tours =

Stefanie Sun concert tours
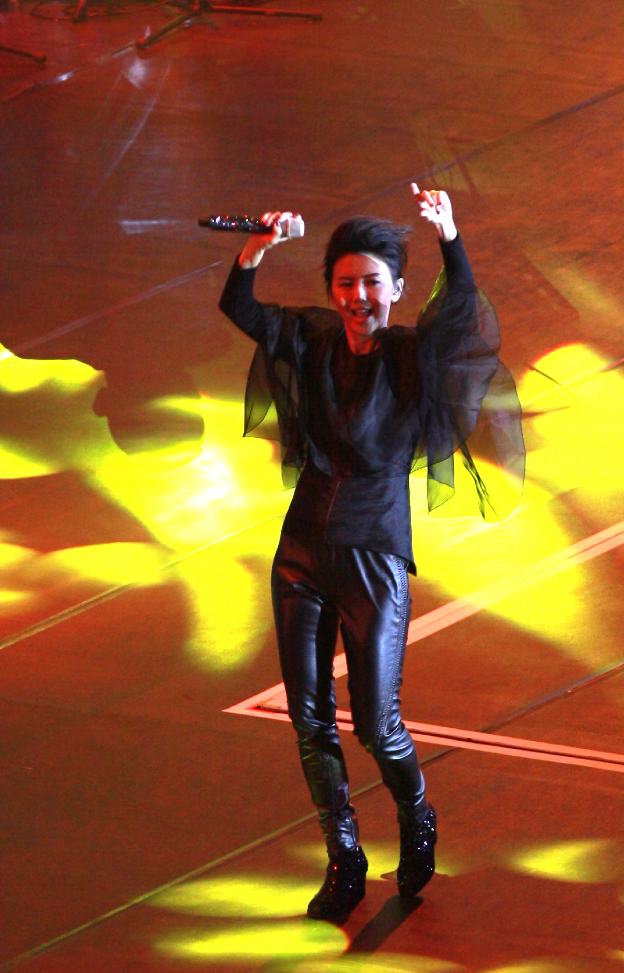
- Sun in 2016
- Concert tours: 5
- Other concerts: 15

This is a list of concert tours by Singaporean singer and songwriter Stefanie Sun. Her first concert tour, the Start World Tour, began in 2002 and lasted until 2004. The Kepler World Tour (2014–15), held in support of her album of the same name, attracted a total of 760,000 people.

== Concert tours ==
Title	Date	Continent(s)	Shows
Start World Tour	23 March 2002 – 10 July 2004	Asia	7
Stefanie Sun World Tour Concert	10 September 2005 – 30 July 2006	Asia	11
The Answer is World Tour	15 May 2009 – 25 December 2010	Asia, North America	13
Kepler World Tour	14 February 2014 – 11 July 2015	Asia	28
Aut Nihilo: Sun Yanzi in Concert	5 April 2025 – 17 May 2026	Asia	26

== Start World Tour ==
List of concert dates
Date	City	Country	Venue
23 March 2002	Taipei	Taiwan	Taipei Municipal Stadium
27 April 2002	Singapore		Singapore Indoor Stadium
3 August 2002	Kuala Lumpur	Malaysia	Bukit Jalil National Stadium
5 June 2004	Guangzhou	China	Tianhe Stadium
12 June 2004	Beijing	China	Capital Indoor Stadium
3 July 2004	Chengdu	China	Chengdu Sports Center
10 July 2004	Changsha	China	Helong Sports Center Stadium

== Stefanie Sun World Tour Concert ==
List of concert dates
Date	City	Country	Venue
10 September 2005	Hong Kong		Hong Kong Coliseum
11 September 2005	Hong Kong		Hong Kong Coliseum
14 January 2006	Singapore		Singapore Indoor Stadium
21 January 2006	Hong Kong		Hong Kong Coliseum
22 January 2006	Hong Kong		Hong Kong Coliseum
22 April 2006	Shanghai	China	Hongkou Football Stadium
28 April 2006	Nanjing	China	Nanjing Olympic Sports Center Stadium
7 May 2006	Genting Highlands	Malaysia	Arena of Stars
8 June 2006	Chongqing	China	Chongqing Olympic Sports Center Stadium
29 July 2006	Taipei	Taiwan	Taipei Arena

== The Answer is World Tour ==
List of concert dates
Date	City	Country	Venue
15 May 2009	Taipei	Taiwan	Taipei Arena
16 May 2009	Taipei	Taiwan	Taipei Arena
11 July 2009	Singapore		Singapore Indoor Stadium
8 August 2009	Shanghai	China	Shanghai Stadium
15 August 2009	Beijing	China	Workers' Stadium
6 November 2009	Chengdu	China	Chengdu Sports Center
5 February 2010	Hong Kong		Hong Kong Coliseum
6 February 2010	Hong Kong		Hong Kong Coliseum
16 February 2010	Singapore		Resorts World Sentosa
28 August 2010	Beijing	China	Capital Indoor Stadium
24 December 2010	Las Vegas	United States	Wynn Las Vegas
25 December 2010 (2 shows)	Las Vegas	United States	Wynn Las Vegas

== Kepler World Tour ==
List of concert dates
Date	City	Country	Venue	Attendance
14 February 2014	Taipei	Taiwan	Taipei Arena	—
15 February 2014	Taipei	Taiwan	Taipei Arena	—
19 April 2014	Shanghai	China	Shanghai Stadium	—
27 April 2014	Guangzhou	China	Tianhe Stadium	—
17 May 2014	Xiamen	China	Xiamen Sports Center Stadium	—
31 May 2014	Tianjin	China	Tianjin Olympic Centre Stadium	—
21 June 2014	Chongqing	China	Chongqing Olympic Sports Center	50,000
28 June 2014	Chengdu	China	Chengdu Sports Centre	40,000
5 July 2014	Singapore		National Stadium	20,000
12 July 2014	Beijing	China	Workers' Stadium	—
24 July 2014	Hong Kong	China	Hong Kong Coliseum	—
25 July 2014	Hong Kong	China	Hong Kong Coliseum	—
27 July 2014	Hong Kong	China	Hong Kong Coliseum	—
30 August 2014	Zhengzhou	China	Henan Sports Center Stadium	30,000
13 September 2014	Wuhan	China	Xinhua Road Sports Center Stadium	30,000
20 September 2014	Hangzhou	China	Yellow Dragon Sports Center Stadium	35,000
11 October 2014	Xi'an	China	Shaanxi Provincial Stadium	—
18 October 2014	Nanjing	China	Wutaishan Stadium	25,000
25 October 2014	Fuzhou	China	Fuzhou Stadium	—
20 December 2014	Kuala Lumpur	Malaysia	Putra Indoor Stadium	—
28 March 2015	Shenzhen	China	Shenzhen Bay Sports Center Stadium	—
11 April 2015	Changzhou	China	Changzhou Olympic Sports Center Stadium	—
25 April 2015	Changsha	China	Helong Sports Center Stadium	—
16 May 2015	Guiyang	China	Guiyang Olympic Sports Center	—
30 May 2015	Nanning	China	Guangxi Sports Center Stadium	—
13 June 2015	Qingdao	China	Conson Stadium	40,000
27 June 2015	Dalian	China	Dalian Sports Center Stadium	35,000
11 July 2015	Macau	China	Cotai Arena	—
Total				760,000

== Aut Nihilo: Sun Yanzi in Concert ==
List of concert dates
Date	City	Country	Venue	Attendance
5 April 2025	Singapore		Singapore Indoor Stadium	28,000
6 April 2025	Singapore		Singapore Indoor Stadium	28,000
12 April 2025	Singapore		Singapore Indoor Stadium	28,000
13 April 2025	Singapore		Singapore Indoor Stadium	28,000
26 April 2025	Shanghai	China	Shanghai Stadium	92,000
28 April 2025	Shanghai	China	Shanghai Stadium	92,000
16 May 2025	Shenzhen	China	Shenzhen Universiade Center Stadium	—N/a
18 May 2025	Shenzhen	China	Shenzhen Universiade Center Stadium	—N/a
13 June 2025	Beijing	China	Beijing National Stadium	100,000 (Note: Rough estimate based on attendance for the first night.)
15 June 2025	Beijing	China	Beijing National Stadium	100,000
18 July 2025	Qingdao	China	Qingdao Citizen Fitness Center Stadium	90,000
20 July 2025	Qingdao	China	Qingdao Citizen Fitness Center Stadium	90,000
16 August 2025	Kaohsiung	Taiwan	Kaohsiung Arena	23,000
18 August 2025	Kaohsiung	Taiwan	Kaohsiung Arena	23,000
19 September 2025	Chongqing	China	Chongqing Olympic Sports Center	80,000 (Note: Rough estimate based on attendance for the first night.)
21 September 2025	Chongqing	China	Chongqing Olympic Sports Center	80,000
24 October 2025	Nanjing	China	Nanjing Olympic Sports Center	100,000
26 October 2025	Nanjing	China	Nanjing Olympic Sports Center	100,000
13 March 2026	Hong Kong		Kai Tak Sports Park	75,000
15 March 2026	Hong Kong		Kai Tak Sports Park	75,000
10 April 2026	Suzhou	China	Suzhou Olympic Sports Center	
12 April 2026	Suzhou	China	Suzhou Olympic Sports Center	
25 April 2026	Kuala Lumpur	Malaysia	Unifi Arena	
26 April 2026	Kuala Lumpur	Malaysia	Unifi Arena	
15 May 2026	Taipei	Taiwan	Taipei Dome	
17 May 2026	Taipei	Taiwan	Taipei Dome	
Total				N/A

== One-off concerts ==
Title	Date	City	Country	Venue	Attendance
Yanzi 2000 Live Concert in Taipei	1 December 2000	Taipei	Taiwan	Chiang Kai-shek Memorial Hall	30,000
The Moment Concert	15 August 2003	Taipei	Taiwan		—
Meet Stefanie Sun Concert	30 September 2003	Hong Kong			—
Stefanie Concert	13 November 2004	Taipei	Taiwan		—
