= Su Rui (album) =

- Standard artwork (Taiwanese release pictured)

Studio album by Su Rui
- Released: June 1983
- Label: UFO Group Ltd 飛碟唱片 (Taiwan); Fontana Records (Hong Kong, vinyl); Philips Records (Hong Kong, CD)

Su Rui chronology
Su Rui (1983)	驀然回首 Mòrán huíshǒu (1984)

Su Rui (Chinese: 蘇芮) is the self-titled 1983 debut album by Su Rui, with English name given as Julie Sue under the Chinese name on the cover of the Hong Kong issue. The singer produced another self-titled album in 1986.

Except in its original Taiwan release, the album includes her first hit single "The Same Moonlight" (一樣的月光; Yīyàng de yuèguāng) and also "Who Will Buy My Old Bottles?" (酒干倘卖无; ciu kan tang bue bo) the hit theme from the Taiwan film Papa, Can You Hear Me Sing.

== Track listing ==
Hong Kong edition
Side one

1. "Overture" (序曲 Xùqǔ)
  from the film Papa, Can You Hear Me Sing
2. "The Same Moonlight" (一样的月光 Yīyàng de yuèguāng)
3. "Whether or Not" (是否 Shìfǒu), written by Luo Da You
  Originally sung by Sylvia Chang in 1981
4. Bǎwò 把握
5. 请跟我来 Qǐng gēn wǒ lái instrumental

Side two

1. "Any Empty Wine Bottles for Sale" (酒干倘卖无 Jiǔ gàn tǎng mài wú)
  Main theme of the film; not in original Taiwanese vinyl edition
2. "Please Come with Me" (请跟我来 Qǐng gēn wǒ lái), duet with Yu Kan-ping (虞戡平)
3. Yīyàng de yuèguāng 一样的月光 (instrumental)
4. Biàn 变
5. 一样的月光2 Yīyàng de yuèguāng 2

== Reception ==
The 2009 book Taiwan Popular Music — 200 Best Albums (台灣流行音樂 200最佳專輯), enlarged from a 1994 list by National Taiwan University (NTU) students, and Ma Shih-fang (馬世芳), a radio DJ at News 98, ranked this album number two of their "top 20 Taiwan popular albums from 1975 to 1992".

== Sales ==
Region	Certification	Certified units/sales
China	—	1,500,000

== See also ==
- List of best-selling albums in China
