= Against the Light =

Studio album by Stefanie Sun
- Released: 22 March 2007
- Recorded: 2006–2007
- Genre: Mandopop
- Length: 43:28
- Language: Chinese
- Label: Capitol
- Producers: Paul Lee; Peter Lee; Stefanie Sun

Stefanie Sun chronology
My Story, Your Song (2006)	Against the Light (2007)	It's Time (2011)

Singles from Against the Light
- 1. "Against the Light" Released: 28 February 2007; 2. "What I Miss" Released: 22 March 2007; 3. "Muttering" Released: 22 March 2007

Against the Light (Chinese: 逆光) is the ninth studio album by Singaporean singer Stefanie Sun. It was released on 22 March 2007, by Capitol Music Taiwan, which was under EMI at the time. It is her first and last record to be released under that label. Produced by Paul Lee, Peter Lee and Sun herself, its musical style is mainly based on Mandopop music with some influences of rock and Britpop music.

A commercial success, the album sold over 1.5 million units throughout Asia. In Taiwan, it sold more than 130,000 units, becoming the second highest-selling album by a female artist and the third highest-selling album overall in 2007. The album earned five nominations at the 19th Golden Melody Awards, with the nominations being for Song of the Year, Best Mandarin Album, Best Lyricist, and Best Arrangement—Sun was also nominated for Best Female Mandarin Singer. After the album's release, Sun went on an extended hiatus and did not release another musical project for four years until It's Time.

== Background and development ==
On 7 October 2005, Sun released her eighth studio album, A Perfect Day. Though this album did not reach the heights of her previous albums, it still found commercial success by selling over 1 million copies in Asia. In Taiwan, it sold more than 100,000 copies, becoming the country's 10th best-selling album of 2005. On 26 September 2006, she released her second compilation album My Story, Your Song, which was her final work to be released under Warner Records. There was only one new track on the greatest hits album called "Rainy Day (雨天)", which became a hit single that was placed at number 37 on the 2006 Hit FM Top 100 Singles of the Year chart. In August 2006, it was announced that Sun joined Capitol Music Taiwan, which was under the umbrella of EMI at the time.

== Writing and recording ==
"Against the Light" is a power ballad that is solely accompanied by a piano in the beginning, but halfway through the song its production soars and becomes a lot more anthemic, thus giving the audience a feeling of seeing hope. "What I Miss" and "Whirlpool" are empathetic ballads. In a story-like structure, they contain ordinary but gripping emotions and are highly resonant songs. The lyrics in "Whirlpool" goes deep into the emotions, while going deep into the powerlessness and profound helplessness of the protagonist in the lyrics. "What I Miss" was crafted by veteran Chinese musicians Daryl Yao and Peter Lee, and lyrically talks about yearning for an estranged lover. Two years later, the song was covered by popular Taiwanese singer Jam Hsiao on his tribute album Love Moments in 2009.

"Sleepwalking" is a medium tempo song with a childlike aura and a special classical atmosphere. The song starts with a majestic melody, followed by a sonata-style melody. "Muttering" and "Pattern of Love" are upbeat songs with pop rock influences. "Floating" is an atmospheric symphonic rock song that sounds very similar to the music of Evanescence; the beginning part musically is solely the sound of a piano, attracting the listener's attention with clean vocals, while guitar, drums and bass are added in the second part. "Needing You" is a quiet love song with a simple melody. "Tranquility" is a calm and quiet unplugged love song which is simple but thought-provoking. "About" has a cool Britpop atmosphere, with the lyrics revolving around Sun's own inner world and is an outlook on life.

== Title and artwork ==
After joining EMI that year, the meaning of the album title expressed Sun's attitude at the time; "Say goodbye to the past and continue to move forward against the light in the next stage." On the album cover, which was taken in Egypt, she is wearing a white top and sports a breezy bob cut while overlooking a pyramid in the background.

== Release and promotion ==
On 1 March 2007, Sun announced that the album would be released on 22 March 2007. On the same day EMI announced that the album was available for pre-order today. The pre-orders in Taiwan exceeded 60,000. Only 10 days after its release the sales in Taiwan officially exceeded the 100,000 mark, while the mainland sales exceeded 500,000 in just one week after its premiere. On 4 May of the same year, the record label released a limited CD+DVD edition of Against The Light to celebrate the album's sales of over one million copies across Asia. On 21 April 2007, Sun held a celebratory concert at Tamsui Fisherman's Wharf to an audience of nearly 20,000 spectators to commemorate the excellent sales of Against The Light. A large number of fireworks were also displayed at the concert, with about 800,000 fireworks burning in just 10 seconds.

On 4 January 2008, Five Music announced that the album reached the runner-up spot on the year-end album sales chart of 2007. On 11 January 2008, the album reached number 11 on the year-end album sales charts of G-Music. Overall the album has sold over 1.5 million copies throughout Asia, while it has sold more than 130,000 copies in Taiwan, becoming the third highest-selling album in the country for the year 2007.

=== Singles and music videos ===
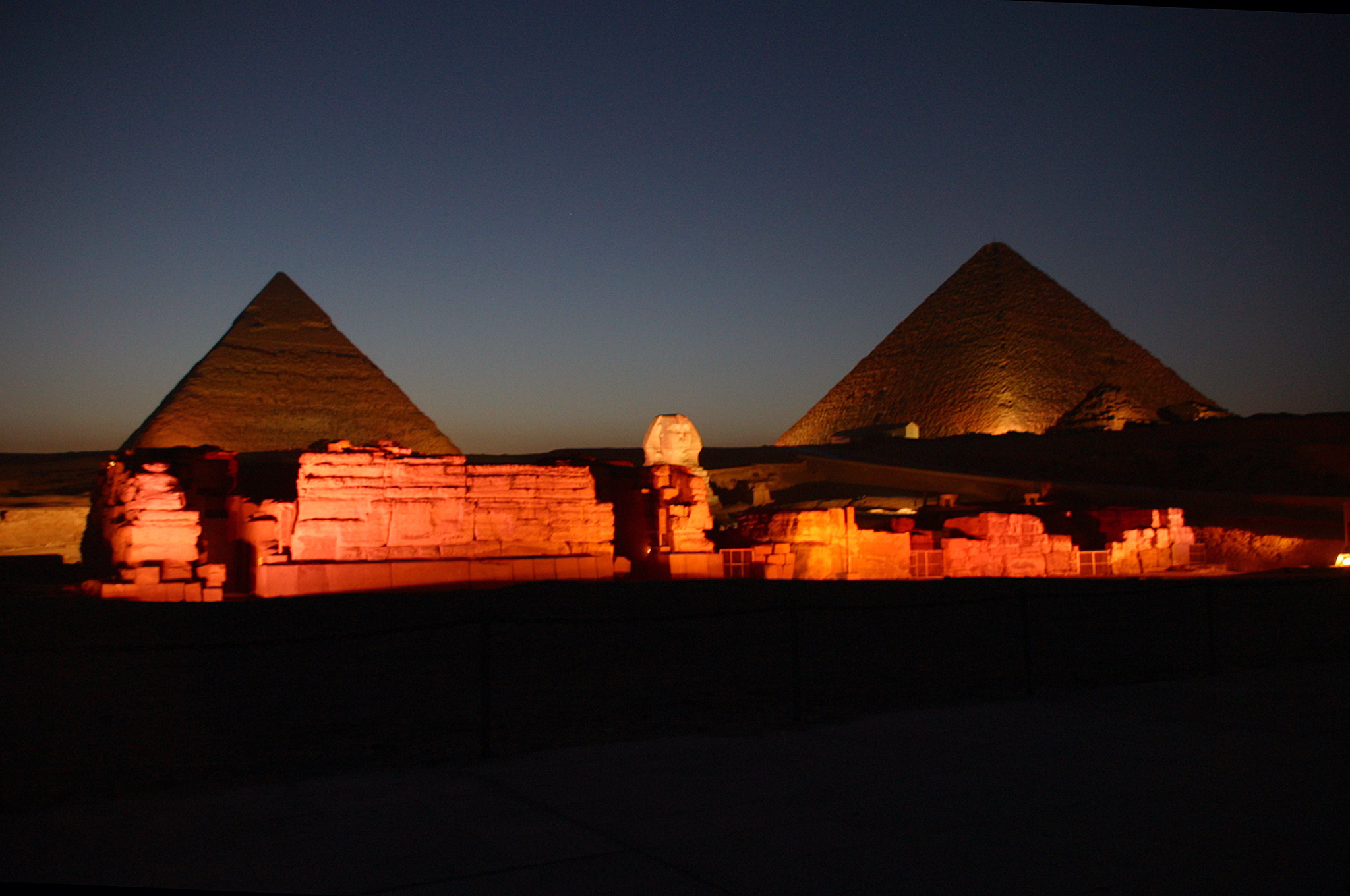
Giza pyramid complex, one of the filming locations for the "Against The Light" music video

On 22 February 2007, Sun went to Cairo, Egypt to shoot the music video for the single "Against The Light", which was directed by prolific music video director Shockley Huang. The video opens with a shot of an airplane flying in the clouds. There are then shots of different areas in the city Cairo. Sun gingerly holds a picture of the pyramids in her hand then dashes out of her hotel room. In the next scene, Sun runs wildly in the scorching hot desert near the world famous Giza pyramid complex while wearing a breezy vest and short skirt. Scenes of Sun and her beau in Taipei are interspersed throughout the video. The video ends with a shot of Sun raising her hand up in the sky against the light of the shining sun.

On 26 February, it was reported that Sun and her crew were threatened by local gangsters while filming the "Against The Light" music video. When interviewed, EMI / Capitol Records general manager Sam Chen only said that Sun was very frightened and told the local station The Singapore Embassy offered them help and rushed the crew in a safe place. On 27 February, Sam Chen held a press conference and claimed that he had been intimidated with pistols and extorted by local gangsters in Egypt, forced to swipe his credit card, and had a financial dispute with a local tour guide. However, due to the repeated statements of the record company, the disappearance of the director, Sun's failure to return to Taiwan, and the staff's avoidance of talks, Chen began to be questioned about "frying news", and the Egyptian incident became a mystery. In an interview on 10 March, Sun said that the report was indeed exaggerated, but the staff and the locals did not reach a consensus on some things. On 26 March, Khalid, the head of the Solar Empire Travel Agency, who hosted Sun and her party to Egypt, explained the whole incident on the Internet. The local tour guide also said in a telephone interview the next day that there had never been any incidents of intimidation with guns, pointing out that someone had lied for publicity. Sam Chen said that there was a gap between the two sides and that they needed to investigate again. After Sam Chen left EMI in 2008, an insider revealed that the Egypt incident was indeed a publicity stunt all along planned by Sam Chen himself. It was only two years later that Sun mentioned the incident for the first time in an interview, and euphemistically stated that she no longer agreed with the current record sales practices.

The music video for "What I Miss" was directed by Xu Yunxuan and tells the love story of a couple. In the video's story, the heroine (played by Sun) and the hero (played by Ting Wei Lu) go from being acquaintances then develop into a couple until they finally breakup. At the end of the video the heroine grips the photograph the two had taken together and looks out silently with a grin. To celebrate the sales of Against The Light reaching one million across Asia, the record company released the music video for "Muttering", which was directed by Lai Weikang and featured the Taiwanese boy band Lollipop F. The music video for "Sleepwalking" is directed by Yu Shao-Hsiang, who also directed the music video for "Needing You". The music video for "Floating" was directed by Xu Yunxuan and also stars Ting Wei Lu as the male lead. The music video for "About" was directed by Lai Weikang.

Not all of the full-length songs in Against The Light had music videos; the tracks "Tranquility", "Patter Of Love" and "Swirl" used edited concert footage instead. In January 2008, the tracks "What I Miss", "Against The Light" and "Muttering" were listed at number 9, number 32, and number 70 respectively on the 2007 Hit FM Top 100 Singles of the Year chart.

== Accolades ==
The song "What I Miss" made it onto the leaderboard at the seventh Global Chinese Songs Ranking's Top 20 most popular hits. At the same ceremony, the album won the "Best Album of the 7th Global Chinese Songs Chart". "Muttering" made it onto the leaderboard at the 2007 Chinese Song Ranking Second Quarter Golden Songs. The album earned an IFPI Hong Kong Top Sales Music Award for Top 10 Best Selling Mandarin Albums of the Year in 2007. At the 19th Golden Melody Awards, Against The Light earned five nominations: Song of the Year, Best Mandarin Album, Best Lyricist, Best Arrangement and Sun herself was nominated for Best Mandarin Female Singer.

== Track listing ==
No.	Title	Lyrics	Music	Arrangement	Length
1.	"In the Beginning"		Stefanie Sun	Stefanie Sun	0:59
2.	"逆光" (Against The Light)	Liao Yingru	Paul Lee	Martin Tang	4:54
3.	"夢游" (Sleep-Walking)	Matthew Yen	Gu Hao	Huang Mingyuan	3:08
4.	"咕嘰咕嘰" (Muttering)	Isaac Chen	Peter Lee	Martin Tang	4:32
5.	"我懷念的" (What I Miss)	Daryl Yao	Peter Lee	Martin Tang	4:49
6.	"安寧" (Tranquility)	Lin Zhuyu	Lin Zhuyu	Adam Lee	3:18
7.	"飄著" (Floating)	Chen Zhenchuan	Paul Lee	Kenn C.	4:09
8.	"愛情的花樣" (Pattern Of Love)	Liao Yingru	Peter Lee	Kenn C.	3:43
9.	"漩渦" (Swirl)	Xiaohan	Peter Lee	Martin Tang	4:51
10.	"需要你" (Needing You)	Jiahui Wu; Shuo Hsiao	Jiahui Wu	Terence Teo	4:08
11.	"關於" (About)	Guan Qiyuan	Eric Ng	Eric Ng	3:57
12.	"Afterward"		Stefanie Sun	Stefanie Sun	0:56
Total length:					43:28

== Charts ==
=== Weekly charts ===
Chart (2007)	Peak position
Taiwanese Albums (G-Music)	1

=== Year-end charts ===
Chart (2007)	Position
Taiwanese Albums (G-Music)	3

== Sales ==
Region	Certification	Certified units/sales
Asia	—	1,000,000
