= My Story, Your Song =

Compilation album by Stefanie Sun
- Released: 26 September 2006
- Genre: Mandopop
- Language: Chinese
- Label: Warner

Stefanie Sun chronology
A Perfect Day (2005)	My Story, Your Song (2006)	Against the Light (2007)

My Story, Your Song is the second compilation album by Singaporean singer Stefanie Sun (simplified Chinese: 孙燕姿; traditional Chinese: 孫燕姿), released on 26 September 2006.

== Track listing ==
CD 1

1. 雨天 (Rainy Day)
2. 我要的幸福 (My Desired Happiness)
3. 天黑黑 (Cloudy Day)
4. Stefanie
5. 風箏 (Kite)
6. 懂事 (Sensible)
7. 壞天氣 (Bad Weather)
8. Honey Honey
9. 很好 (Fine)
10. The Moment
11. 第一天 (First Day)
12. 我也很想他 (I Miss Him Too)
13. 愛從零開始 (Love Start from the Beginning)
14. 相信 (Believe)
15. Hey Jude

CD 2

1. 第六感 (The Sixth Sense)
2. 神奇 (Magical)
3. 隨堂測驗 (Quiz)
4. 任性 (Abandon)
5. Silent All These Years
6. 慢慢來 (Take It Slow)
7. 一樣的夏天 (Summer as Usual)
8. 害怕 (Fear)
9. Someone
10. 濃眉毛 (Sculpted Eyebrow)
11. 了解 (To Know)
12. 夢不落 (Flyin with Dreams)
13. Leave
14. Leave Me Alone
15. 明天晴天 (Sunny Day Tomorrow)
16. Our Memory

CD 3

1. 原點 (Starting Point)
2. 開始懂了(Realize)
3. 愛情證書 (Love Document)
4. 愛情字典 (Love Dictionary)
5. 星期一天氣晴我離開你 (Leaving You on the Sunny Monday)
6. 我不難過 (I Am Fine)
7. 眼淚成詩 (Poems & Tears)
8. 遇見 (Encounter)
9. 不是真的愛我 (You Don't Really Love Me)
10. 同類 (Someone Like Me)
11. 逃亡 (Abscondence)
12. 終於 (Finally)
13. 我不愛 (I Don't Love)
14. 隱形人 (Invisible)
15. 我的愛 (My Love)

CD 4

1. 夢想天空 (A Sky Full of Dreams)
2. 零缺點 (Perfect)
3. 直來直往 (Straight Forward)
4. 祝你開心 (Wish You Happiness)
5. 作戰 (Fight)
6. 超快感 (Turbo)
7. 完美的一天 (A Perfect Day)
8. 難得一見 (Only Chance)
9. 奔 (Running)
10. 未完成 (To Be Continued)
11. 綠光 (Green Light)
12. 練習 (Practice)
13. Venus
14. 和平 (Make Peace)
15. 種 (Nurture Your Dreams)
