= Clarence Lee (make-up artist) =

Singaporean make-up artist (born 1973)

Clarence Lee (born 1973) is a Singaporean professional make-up artist.

== Early life ==
Lee was born in 1973 in Singapore, to a working-class family. His father was a technician, and his mother, Sai Wan (née Wong), was a cashier. The youngest of four children, Lee, in his childhood, would enjoy fiddling with his mother's make-up kits. He attended Bedok Primary School and Chai Chee Secondary School. Interested in the field of make-up in as early as his primary school years, he studied the subject at Cosmoprof Academy.

== Career ==
As a primary school student, Lee was unsatisfied with how his make-up was done during performances. As such, decided to do it himself. After the completion of his mandatory national service, Lee worked as a professional make-up artist at Shaw Centre's Fox Hair Salon, before breaking out after two years there. His "celebrity clients" include Zhang Ziyi, Stefanie Sun, The Spice Girls, and Chris Isaak. Described as a "make-up maestro", Lee has been featured on numerous television programmes. He has won many awards, including Make-up Artist of the Year at the 2001 Singapore Fashion Awards. He is the owner of Oblique, a store selling perfumes, and is the co-owner of fashion boutique Hide & Seek.

== Personal life ==
Lee is reportedly friends with professional hairstylist David Gan. Lee has openly admitted to receiving plastic surgery, and applying make-up on a daily basis. He is an avid perfume collector, and has more than a hundred bottles in his collection. This interest started in his teenage years, when he had to hide the perfumes from his mother.
