= Stefanie (album) =

Studio album by Stefanie Sun
- Released: 29 October 2004
- Recorded: 2004
- Genre: Mandopop
- Length: 46:36
- Language: Chinese
- Label: Warner
- Producer: Paul Lee; Peter Lee; Stefanie Sun

Stefanie Sun chronology
The Moment (2003)	Stefanie (2004)	A Perfect Day (2005)

Singles from Stefanie
- 1. "My Love" Released: 13 October 2004; 2. "I Miss Him, Too" Released: 29 October 2004; 3. "Someone Like Me" Released: 29 October 2004

Stefanie is the seventh studio album by Singaporean singer Stefanie Sun. It was released on 29 October 2004, by Warner Music Taiwan. Produced by Paul Lee, Peter Lee and Sun herself, it incorporates a wide variety of musical genres such as pop, African music, tango, soft rock and lounge music. In terms of musical structure, each song has an instrument as the main axis in terms of its respective musical structure. The album is named after Sun's English name "Stefanie."

Music critics responded positively to the album, praising Sun's musicality. One month after the album was officially released, total sales across Asia exceeded 2.2 million copies. In Taiwan the album sold 180,000 copies throughout 2004, making it the sixth best-selling album of the year in the country as well as the year's second highest-selling album by a female solo artist. The album earned two Golden Melody Award nominations for Best Mandarin Album and Best Female Mandarin Singer in 2005 at the 16th annual ceremony, and she finally won Best Mandarin Female Singer.

== Background and development ==
On 22 August 2003, Sun released her first compilation album, The Moment. On the first day of the album's release, 200,000 copies were sold in Taiwan, and the final sales volume in Asia exceeded 1.5 million. Shortly after the album was released, Sun publicly announced that she would "take a break" for a year. In the same year, she established her own management and production company called "Make Music."

The reason for her hiatus is that after her debut in 2000, she released 5 albums in 3 and a half years. The overloaded work not only made Sun unbearable, but also caused the standard of the album to decline. In the meantime she spent more time with her boyfriend and family, and traveled to Japan, Thailand, and New York. According to the record company: “During this year, she rested and settled at the same time; she worked hard in life, but she also grew up at the same time. Over the past year or so, Stefanie has occasionally been seen and heard in concert venues or in clips of advertising screens, and more often, she is living an ordinary life that she has longed for in her own world.” After a year long break from the spotlight, Sun's mentality had become more peaceful. In addition to composing two songs and writing the lyrics to one, she also participated in the production of this album, selecting songs herself and participating in the discussion of the structure and arrangement of each song. Sun hoped to use this album to make a summary of her musical journey. For the completion of the album, Sun also learned modern dance, practicing until the skin on her feet was broken, but still enduring the pain and performed.

The album Stefanie is the one in which Sun participated the most. The eighth track "Nurture Your Dreams" was written and composed entirely by Sun herself. In order to create more natural sound effects, she went to the Botanic Gardens in Singapore to perform sound recording work. She went there for several days just to collect some natural sounds of insects and birds. The album's genres are diverse, with each song taking an instrument as the main axis in terms of musical structure. This includes flute and violin ensembles, a combination of free music and rock music, harpsichord and strings, love songs with exciting strings music and accordion. African music, tango and other genres are integrated into each other to complete a music work exclusive to Sun. At the same time, the album creates a different musical index, taking into account both rich musicality and commercial marketability.

== Writing and recording ==
The opening track "Running," Sun's first attempt at a rock song, carries a set of verses and lyrics that are explosive and speedy. The song uses a mixture of electronic and rock music to complement Sun's passionate vocals. The arrangement of "My Love" is mainly piano and strings, and the piccolo is added in time to make the audience feel calmer and more distant. "Wish You Happiness" musically takes influence from country and folk music. "I Miss Him Too" is a torch song that describes the youthful memories and ignorant love affairs that occurred in one's salad days. "Hear" is a song with a fresh style; the arrangement is based on rock and roll, combined with a relaxed flavor, and the embellishment of the harpsichord. The style of the song "Take It Slow" is very unorthodox in the world of C-Pop, with the rhythm of electronic dance music interspersed with the influences of flamenco and tango.

"Someone Like Me" is a string-based midtempo ballad. Breaking away from Sun's previous personal creative style, "Nurture Your Dreams" is based on the concept of African music. "Turn Around" integrates dance-pop with heavy metal instruments, such as electric guitar and bass, and features a rap section in English. The album's title track is a pop rock ballad written by Sun herself. "Let's Vino" is an upbeat, spritely pop rock song. "Let's Vino" was not included in the first edition of the album released in Mainland China in 2004. "The Brilliant Unknown Future" is a cheerful pop rock song that describes young people's attitude towards the future, and how they want to control the unknown years by themselves and don't want anyone to arrange it for them.

== Release and promotion ==
On 10 October 2004, it was formally announced that the album would be available for pre-order on 15 October 2004. It was also reported that the album's lead single "My Love" will be premiered simultaneously across Asia from 13 to 15 October. On 27 October 2004, Sun held a press conference for the release of the album. Before its official release, album pre-orders in Taiwan exceeded 200,000, while pre-orders in mainland China exceeded 400,000, and orders for the album across Asia exceeded 1.5 million. The album peaked at number one on the album sales charts of G-Music and Asia Records in Taiwan. On 28 December 2004, it was revealed that Stefanie became the year's second highest-selling album by a female solo artist and the year's sixth highest-selling album overall in Taiwan.

When Warner Records confirmed that the sales of the new album had exceeded 1.8 million copies, Sun held a new song release party to thank her fans, attracting tens of thousands of people to the small town of Tamsui. On the afternoon of 27 November 2004, Sun also held a grand album celebration and stamping event in Ximending. During the event the label announced that the album had sold more than 2.2 million copies in Asia. At the event that day, Sun entered the venue with a "100-meter run." On the 100-meter red carpet runway, four low hurdles were set up, each representing a sales volume of 500,000; she happily performed the "100-meter hurdle" to enter the venue, and finally crossed the 2.2 million victory line at the end, symbolizing her journey along the way. The fans who came to the venue that day not only came to see their idol, but also enthusiastically responded to Sun's call for love and brought in a total of 10,000 candies for Sun to take to India to give to local children. On 30 November 2004, Warner released the Platinum Edition of the album, which additionally includes a DVD containing "My Love - 25-Minute Music Special of Paris Trip," "My Love - 15-Minute Paris Music Movie," the music video for "Running" and "Someone Like Me," along with a set of six postcards to boot.

=== Singles and music videos ===
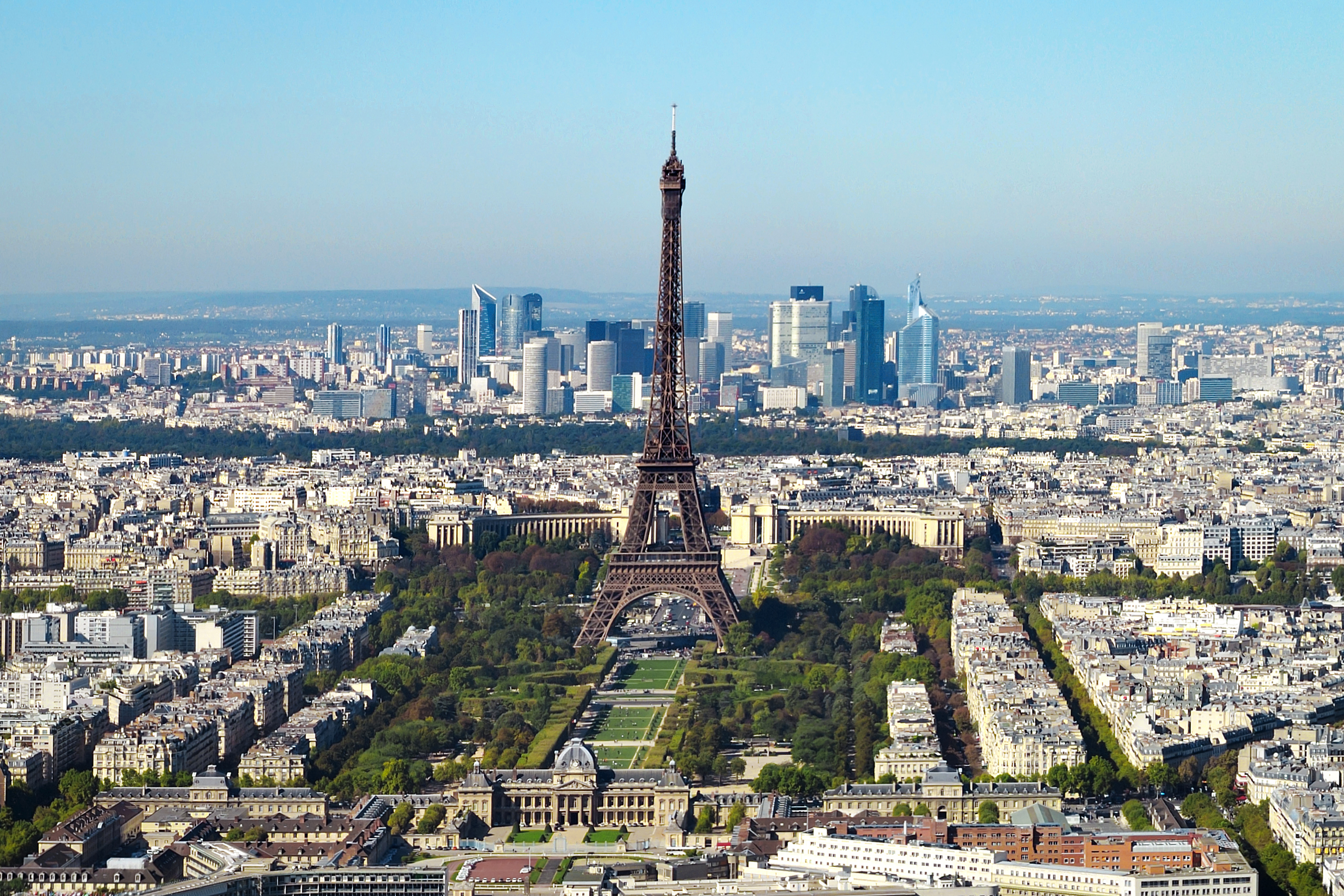
The music video for "My Love" was filmed in Paris

On 29 October 2004, Sun released the single, "My Love." The music video was directed by Jinhe Lin and filmed in Paris, France. In addition to filming the music video during this trip to France, she also went to Normandy; where the Allied forces landed in Europe. In the music video, the music video director tried to reproduce Sun's characteristics through a time and space that can be zeroed in: simple and ordinary, the courage to give up, face it, and the courage to start over. Let Stefanie Sun go to a place where no one knows her, a place full of tourist atmosphere, live like an ordinary person, and create the power of singers and music to humanize. Use the transformation of time and space and the guidance of images to suggest the beginning of a new stage. Being an ordinary person is her greatest desire. A girl who likes to sing is her true self, showing Sun's characteristics and charm.

The shooting for the music video for the song "Run," which was directed by Shockley Huang, took two days, one day in the studio and one day on location. When filming, the director asked Sun to keep running until her feet were battered and bruised, and finally called three strong men to pour water on her. In the video, Sun not only dances modern dance, but also hangs on a tightrope and does somersaults. Throughout the music video, Sun shows the strength of her body through dance, and runs, jumps and dances in the grassland.

The music videos for "Wish You Happiness," "Take It Slow" and "I Miss Him Too" were also directed by Shockley Huang. The song "I Miss Him Too" was used as the Taiwan theme song of the 2004 Japanese drama film Crying Out Love in the Center of the World. The music video for "Someone Like Me" was directed by Jinhe Lin, and the music video for "The Brilliant Unknown Future" was directed by Ma Yizhong.

In January 2005, the tracks "My Love," "Someone Like Me" and "Running" were listed at number 5, number 26 and number 39 respectively on the 2004 Hit FM Top 100 Singles of the Year chart.

== Critical reception ==
A reviewer from Freshmusic's reviewed the album, stating: "After his comeback, his album didn't sell as well as before. But this is also the time when the musicality starts to become stronger and stronger. It feels very fresh except that the title song 'My Love' is too guava. I still love 'Run' very much. It is full of energy."

Ffsky user gave the album a favourable review, stating at the end: "Stefanie Sun is finally officially back, congratulations! After the blow of the album "Unfinished" (because it is too POP and obviously caters to the market), the new "Stefanie" really gave me a surprise. Let's discuss it together."

== Accolades ==
Stefanie earned an IFPI Hong Kong Top Sales Music Award for Top 10 Best Selling Mandarin Albums of the Year in 2004. On 19 January 2005, "My Love" won the 27th Hong Kong Top Ten Chinese Golden Song Awards Bronze Award for Outstanding Popular Mandarin Song. On 20 March 2005, "My Love" made it onto the leaderboard of the Top Ten Golden Songs of Hong Kong and Taiwan in the 5th Music Chart. On 22 April 2005, the album Stefanie won the 2004MusicRadio China TOP Ranking Best Album of the Year in Hong Kong and Taiwan award. On 22 May 2005, "My Love" made it onto the leaderboard at the second King of Songs Awards' Top Ten Mandarin Golden Songs.

At the MTV Asia Awards 2005 Sun won the MTV Asia Award for Favorite Artist Singapore for the fourth year in a row. The album also earned two Golden Melody Award nominations for Best Mandarin Album and Best Female Mandarin Singer at the 16th annual ceremony, and she finally won Best Mandarin Female Singer.

== Track listing ==
No.	Title	Lyrics	Music	Arrangement	Length
1.	"奔" (Run)	Tian Tian	Peter Lee	Kenn C	3:39
2.	"我的愛" (My Love)	Xiaohan	Lin Yixin	Goh Kheng Long	4:21
3.	"祝你開心" (Wish You Happiness)	Jiahui Wu	Jiahui Wu	Masahiko Fukui	3:50
4.	"我也很想他" (I Miss Him, Too)	Percy Phang; April Wu	Percy Phang	Andrew Tuason	4:15
5.	"聽見" (Heard)	Liao Yingru	Stefanie Sun	Goh Kheng Long	3:45
6.	"慢慢來" (Take It Slow)	Isaac Chen	Paul Lee	Kenn C	3:43
7.	"同類" (Someone Like Me)	Kevin Yi	Peter Lee	Terence Teo	3:30
8.	"種" (Nurture Your Dreams)	Liao Yingru	Stefanie Sun	Kenn C	4:11
9.	"反過來走走" (Turn Around)	William Hung	Li Jiayi	Adam Lee	3:49
10.	"Stefanie"	Stefanie Sun	Chen Dawei	Adam Lee	4:22
11.	"Let's Vino"	Shuo Hsiao; Xu Guangyi	Xu Guangyi	Kenn C	3:40
12.	"未知的精彩" (The Brilliant Unknown Future)	Xiaohan	Eric Ng	Eric Ng	3:08
Total length:					46:36

== Charts ==
=== Weekly charts ===
Chart (2004)	Peak position
Malaysian Albums (RIM)	8
Singaporean Albums (RIAS)	2

=== Year-end charts ===
Chart (2004)	Position
Taiwanese Albums	6

== Sales ==
Region	Certification	Certified units/sales
Asia	—	2,200,000
