= No. 13 – A Dancing Van Gogh =

Studio album by Stefanie Sun
- Released: 11 November 2017
- Recorded: 2014–2017
- Genre: Mandopop
- Length: 39:22
- Label: Universal Music Taiwan

Stefanie Sun chronology
| Kepler (2014) | No. 13 – A Dancing Van Gogh (2017) |

No. 13 – A Dancing Van Gogh (Chinese: No. 13作品－跳舞的梵谷) is the thirteenth studio album by Singaporean singer Stefanie Sun (Chinese: 孙燕姿), released on 9 November 2017 by Universal Music Taiwan.

== Background and development ==
After the release of Kepler in 2014, Stefanie Sun held 28 Kepler World Tour concerts and released an EP and three singles. During this time, Sun began to learn how to paint. During the painting process, she realized many viewpoints, including the meaning of being a singer. She extended these viewpoints to music, and thus the album A Dancing Van Gogh was born. In the process of creating the album, Sun wanted to make a darker, more dramatic piece, which led to the album's eponymous song, "Dancing Van Gogh", which caught her attention when she first heard the demo version of it in 2014. The song was a hit, and Sun immediately recognized it as the hit song she had in mind. "Madness and sanity go hand in hand" became the theme of the album. During the recording process, Sun discussed with the producer to add many sound effects and background sounds to give the song a sense of theater. The female operatic voice in the song is also sung by Sun. Through Van Gogh's spirit, Sun hoped to encourage her audience to be brave in everything they do.

"A State of Bliss" was the fastest recorded song in the album. On first listen to the demo, Sun was overwhelmed by the atmosphere of the song. The contrast between the calmness of the song and the absolute loneliness of its title, "I'm Happy", was so striking that Sun chose to include it as the album's key lyric. Lyricist Jufang created "Windbreaker", inspired by the idea that "things are objects, not love". The album originally included "The Last Part Goodbye", but it was dropped because it didn't fit the theme of the album. The last song in the album is "Immense Beauty". As the album was approaching its due date, the production team had not yet found a suitable song to close the album, so Sun decided to write the lyrics herself and produced "Extremely Beautiful" in 3 days of seclusion.

== Track listing ==
1. 風衣 Windbreaker
2. 我很愉快 A State of Bliss
3. 跳舞的梵谷 A Dancing Van Gogh
4. 天越亮，夜越黑 Daybreak
5. 天天年年 A Day; A Year
6. 漂浮群島 Levitate
7. 超人類 An Interval
8. 充氧期 Refuel and Rewind
9. 平日快樂 The Pursuit of Contentment
10. 極美 Immense Beauty

== Charts ==
=== Weekly charts ===
| Chart (2017) | Peak position |
|---|---|
| Hong Kong Albums (HKRMA) | 3 |
