= A Perfect Day (album) =

Studio album by Stefanie Sun
- Released: 7 October 2005
- Recorded: 2005
- Genre: Mandopop; sunshine pop
- Length: 41:02
- Language: Chinese
- Label: Warner
- Producer: Jia Minshu; Peter Lee; Paul Lee

Stefanie Sun chronology
Stefanie (2004)	A Perfect Day (2005)	My Story, Your Song (2006)

A Perfect Day (Chinese: 完美的一天) is the eighth studio album by Singaporean singer Stefanie Sun. It was released on 7 October 2005, by Warner Music Taiwan. Produced by Jia Minshu, Peter Lee, and Paul Lee, it incorporates a variety of popular music genres such as pop, rock, electronic and lounge music.

A Perfect Day album fared well commercially by selling over 1 million copies in Asia less than a month after it was widely released throughout Greater China. In Taiwan, the album sold more than 100,000 copies, becoming the country's 10th best-selling album of the year 2005, as well as the year's fourth best-selling album by a female artist. A Perfect Day was ultimately Sun's last original studio album to be released under Warner Music Group, since she left the company the following year in 2006 to go to Capital Music Taiwan.

== Background and development ==
On 29 October 2004, Sun released her seventh studio album, Stefanie, which sold more than 2.2 million copies in Asia. In Taiwan, it sold more than 180,000 copies, becoming the year's sixth highest-selling album overall. The album also earned two Golden Melody Award nominations for Best Mandarin Album and Best Female Mandarin Singer in 2005, and she finally won Best Mandarin Female Singer.

Stefanie Sun can be regarded as the music director of A Perfect Day. The entire plan for the production of this record was personally discussed and decided by Sun, and the songs were all selected only if she was fond of them. The entire album represents Stefanie Sun's own views and attitudes. In an interview, Sun stated that the concept of the album is defined as: "You like it, you don't like it, it's all very intuitive. The most direct things are the most touching. The music doesn't need to be fancy. If it's already like that, you just need to add the icing on the cake without blurring the focus."

== Writing and recording ==
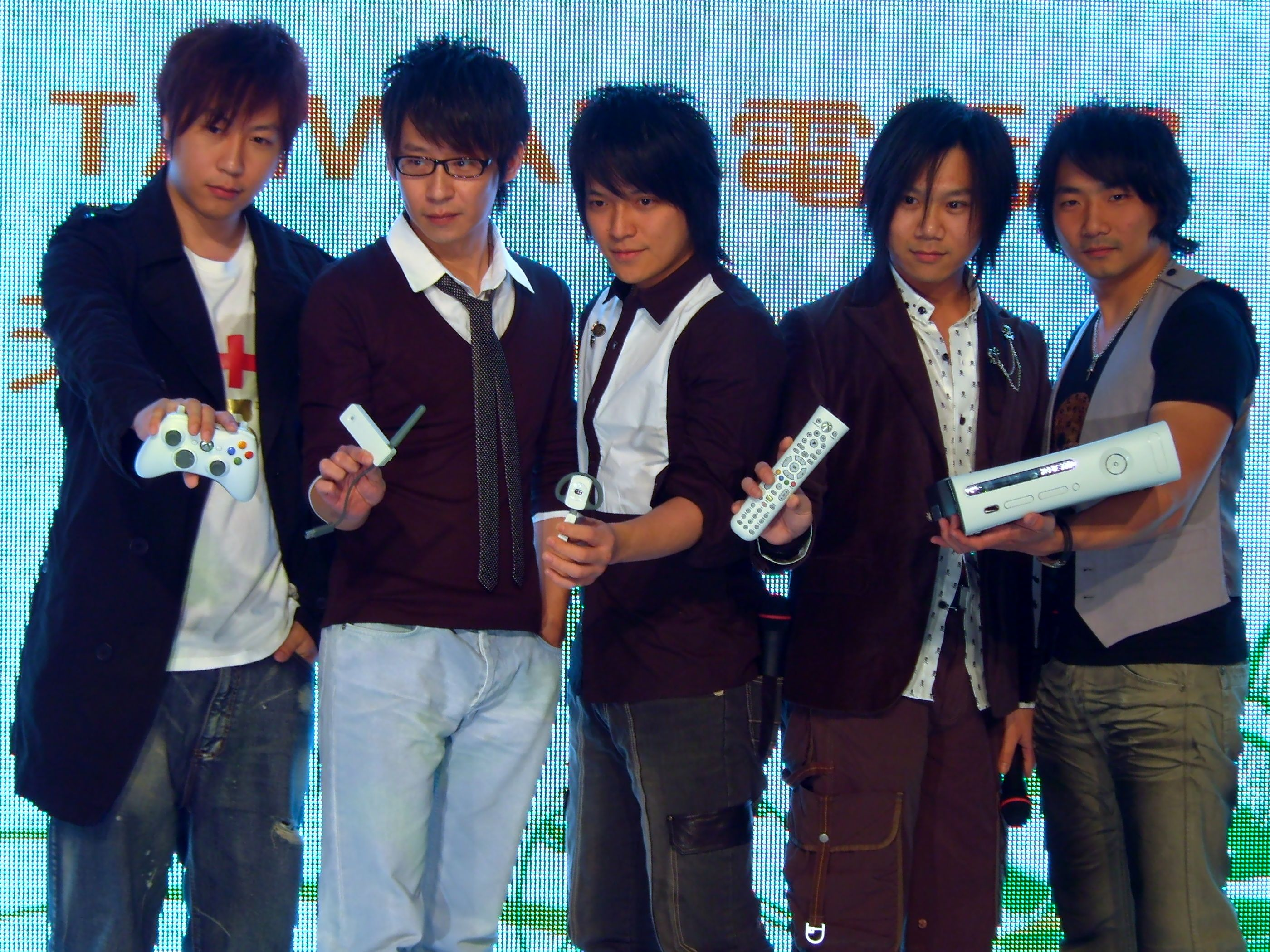
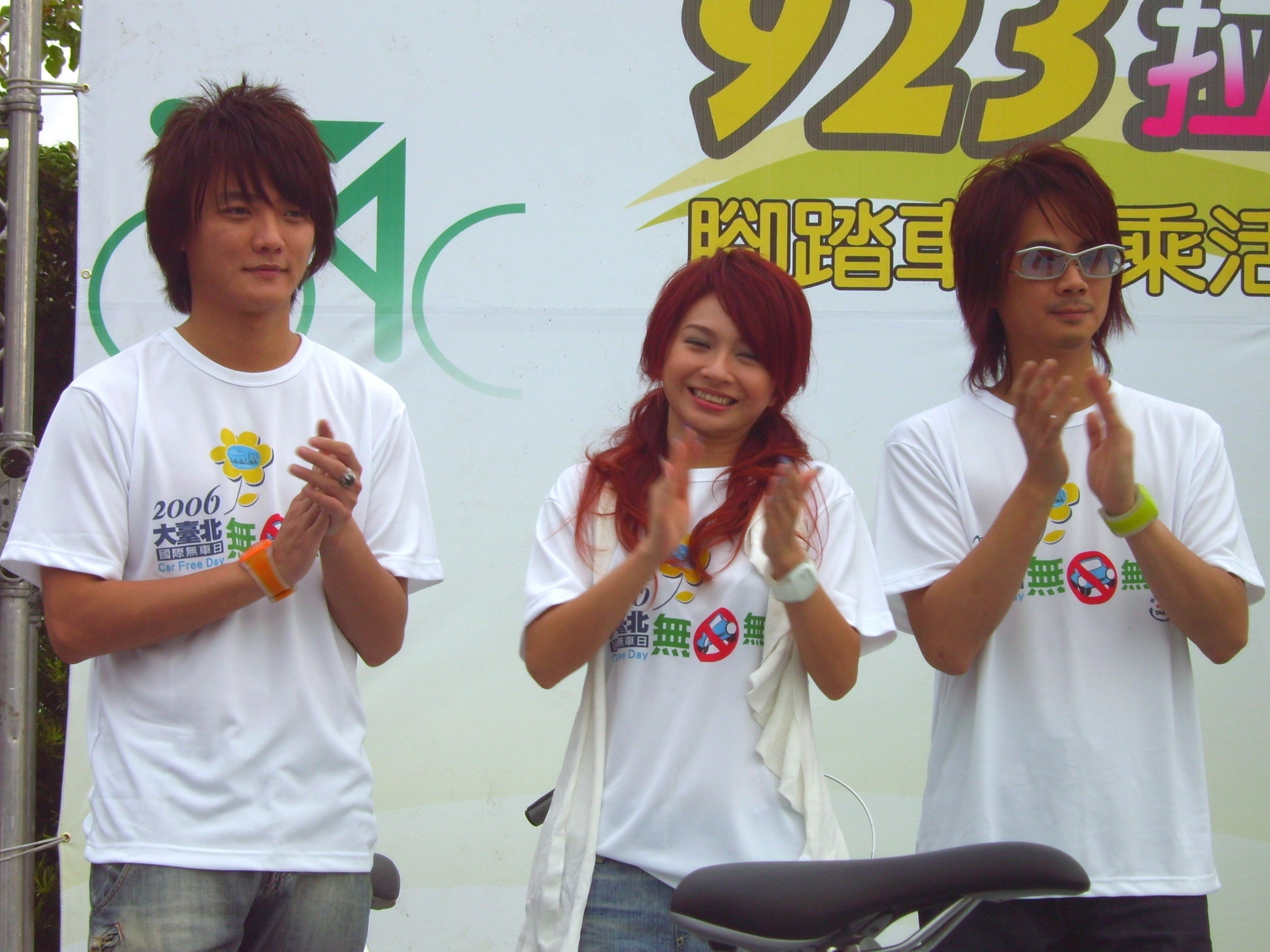
Mayday (left) and F.I.R. (right), two of Sun's collaborators on the album

The album A Perfect Day presents new musical and sonic elements. The piano, erhu and strings overlap to concoct the torch song "Poems & Tears," which was composed by Liu Bao-Long while the lyrics were written by the well-known lyricist Albert Leung. Chet Lam, the composer for Sun's 2003 smash hit "Encounter," composed "Honey Honey" for Sun, while Peter Lee and Sun followed "Green Light" and developed the fast-paced song "Flying With Dreams" with the instrumental sounding reminiscent of a marching band. One of the most popular songs on the album, "First Day," is co-produced by Stefanie Sun and the groups Mayday and F.I.R. The artists' names also cleverly matches the song title (First Day, F.I.R. Stefanie May Day). The album's title track is composed by Chinese musician Yu Yang, marking the first time that a composition made by someone from the mainland appears on a Stefanie Sun album. "Wandermap" is a mid-tempo ballad composed and written by Shuo Hsiao. "Invisible" is a touching slow song written by Xiaohan and composed by Jim Lim and Eric Ng.

"Honey Honey" was tailor-made by Chet Lam and is coupled with Sun's narration, children's harmonies and laughter, ukuleles, triangles, castanets and has a child-like sound. "Wish" is a pop rock ballad composed by Sommerdahl Harry, Hamid Kinda and Hortlund Rebecca, while lyrics were helmed by Jennifer Hsu. "Another Face" is a jazzy sounding song composed by Peter Lee and written by Poly Lin. The closing track "Sunny Day Tomorrow" was composed by Sun herself, with lyrics written by Jennifer Hsu.

== Title and artwork ==
Warner Records also invested a lot of manpower in the shooting of the album's cover and inner page photos. Stefanie and the crew made a special trip to Hualien County for filming, and the filming lasted for three full days. The album cover was shot in Qixingtan Beach in Xincheng Township. On the cover Sun is standing on the seashore while smiling ear to ear, while showed off her explosive red hair for the first time.

== Release and promotion ==
On 27 September 2005, a red-haired Sun guest starred on the Taiwanese entertainment news and variety show 100% Entertainment, where she introduced the limited pre-order version of her new album A Perfect Day. On 29 September 2005, Sun announced that the album would be released on 7 October 2005, which, in turn, sparked a pre-order frenzy. What was particularly special is that the pre-order included not only CDs but also cassette tapes for the first time. The CD and cassette pre-orders were limited to 200,000 copies and 50,000 boxes respectively. Starting from 25 September, mainland fans could go to video stores across the country and pay the full price in advance to order an album CD and receive an exclusive Stefanie Sun "Perfect Day Private Photo Album" on the spot, including more than a hundred highlights. The photos allowed fans to peek into Sun's day. In addition, there was also a sticker sheet. Fans who pre-ordered the cassette received a set of Sun's "Perfect Day" photo postcards. In Taiwan, the high volume of pre-orders also stunned the Warner Music staff. In just 10 days, the number of pre-orders for Sun's ring tones exceeded 200,000.

At one o'clock noon on 8 October 2005, to promote A Perfect Day, Sun moved into a temporary transparent glasshouse in the plaza of Taipei 101 for 24 hours, allowing fans to witness her daily life; it was reported that the glasshouse and the furniture inside was auctioned afterwards, and the money was used to fund the construction of shelters in India. Due to the live broadcast of her whole day's schedule on the internet, 300,000 people went online to browse her life in the glasshouse the night before. On 22 October 2005, Sun performed at the MTV Music Fighting Concert at the Zhongshan Soccer Stadium alongside other artists such as 5566, Alan Kuo and Yida Huang. On 28 October 2005, Sun held an album celebration event in Taipei, Taiwan, and she announced that the total sales for A Perfect Day in Asia exceeded 1 million copies. On 30 October 2005, Sun held an autograph session in Hong Kong, which attracted 300 fans to attend. On the evening of 17 November 2005, Sun held a fan meeting at the Beijing Hong Kong Coliseum, which attracted thousands of fans. On 18 November 2005, Sun went to Shanghai to hold a press conference for her new album. By the end of the year, A Perfect Day reached number eleven and number fourteen on the year-end album sales charts of G-Music and Five Music of 2005, respectively.

=== Singles and music videos ===
The first music videos from the album to be released were "Perfect Day" and "First Day." In the "First Day" music video, in order to capture the relaxed and happy atmosphere that suits the song, the director Xu Yunxuan specially went to Tamsui Beach and invited a group of student bands to join Sun in the shooting. The music video for "Perfect Day" was directed by prolific music video director Shockley Huang. The music video of "Poems & Tears" was directed by Jinhe Lin; the music video portrays a flashback of the heroine tearing up all the "lyrics" on the room after breaking up with her beau. The music video of "Invisible" was directed by Jinhe Lin as well and starred Kuo Bea-ting and Ladder Yu. The music video for "Honey Honey" was directed by Leste Chen, the music video for "Wish" was directed by Chen Zhaoliang, and the music video for "Flying With Dreams" was directed by Lai Weikang. In January 2006, the tracks "First Day," "Poems & Tears" and "Honey Honey" were listed at number 10, number 22, and number 53 respectively on the 2005 Hit FM Top 100 Singles of the Year chart.

== Accolades ==
On 28 October 2005, the album won the Best Album Award in the 6th Global Chinese Songs Ranking. At the 17th Golden Melody Awards the album was nominated twice; Sun was nominated for Best Female Mandarin Singer while Yu Yang was nominated for Best Composer Award. The album's title track was nominated for Top 10 Gold Songs at the Hong Kong TVB8 Awards, presented by television station TVB8, in 2005. The album was awarded one of the Top 10 Selling Mandarin Albums of the Year at the 2005 IFPI Hong Kong Album Sales Awards, presented by the Hong Kong branch of IFPI.

== Track listing ==
No.	Title	Lyrics	Music	Arrangement	Length
1.	"完美的一天" (A Perfect Day)	Yu Yang	Yu Yang	Yu Yang	4:05
2.	"眼淚成詩" (Poems & Tears)	Albert Leung	Liu Bao-Long	Terence Teo	3:41
3.	"隱形人" (Invisible)	Xiaohan	Jim Lim; Eric Ng	Eric Ng	4:36
4.	"流浪地圖" (Wandermap)	Shuo Hsiao	Shuo Hsiao	Eric Ng	4:05
5.	"第一天" (First Day)	Ashin	Stefanie Sun; F.I.R.; Mayday	Stefanie Sun; F.I.R.; Mayday	4:13
6.	"Honey Honey"	Chet Lam	Chet Lam	Tiger Chung; Jiang Liping; Ren Baizhang	4:23
7.	"心願" (Wish)	Jennifer Hsu	Sommerdahl Harry; Hamid Kinda; Hortlund Rebecca	Andong	4:33
8.	"另一張臉" (Another Face)	Poly Lin	Peter Lee	Adam Lee	3:43
9.	"夢不落" (Flying With Dreams)	Wei En Liu	Peter Lee	Kenn C.	3:46
10.	"明天晴天" (Sunny Day Tomorrow)	Jennifer Hsu	Stefanie Sun	Andong	3:52
Total length:					41:02

== Charts ==
=== Weekly charts ===
Chart (2005)	Peak position
Taiwanese Albums (G-Music)	1

=== Year-end charts ===
Chart (2005)	Position
Taiwanese Albums	10
