= It's Time (Stefanie Sun album) =

Studio album by Stefanie Sun
- Released: March 8, 2011
- Genre: Mandopop
- Language: Chinese
- Label: Wonderful

Stefanie Sun chronology
Against the Light (2007)	It's Time (2011)	Kepler (2014)

It's Time (simplified Chinese: 是时候; traditional Chinese: 是時候) is the eleventh studio album by Singaporean singer Stefanie Sun. It was released on March 8, 2011, by Wonderful Music and was her sole record to be released by the company. The album sold more than 75,000 copies in Taiwan alone, and became the second best-selling album of the year in Taiwan.

== Track listing ==
No.	Title	Length
1.	"世說心語" (A Voice Within)
2.	"追" (The Chase)
3.	"當冬夜漸暖" (Time and Tide)
4.	"時光小偷" (Thief of Time)
5.	"空口言" (Sky)
6.	"明天的記憶" (Tomorrow's Memory)
7.	"180度" (180 Degrees)
8.	"快瘋了" (Crazy)
9.	"愚人的國度" (Fool's Kingdom)
10.	"是時候" (It's Time)
