= To Be Continued... (Stefanie Sun album) =

Studio album by Stefanie Sun
- Released: January 10, 2003
- Genre: Mandopop
- Length: 47:56
- Language: Chinese
- Label: Warner
- Producer: Paul Lee; Paul Lee; Tino Bao; Stefanie Sun

Stefanie Sun chronology
Leave (2002)	To Be Continued... (2003)	The Moment (2003)

To Be Continued... (Chinese: 未完成) is the sixth studio album by Singaporean singer Stefanie Sun. It was released on 10 January 2003, by Warner Music Taiwan. It was produced by Peter Lee, Paul Lee, Tino Bao and Sun herself.

The album sold more than 2.1 million copies in Asia. Within a month and a half of its launch, the album sold over 280,000 copies in Taiwan alone. By the end of 2003, it sold more than 290,000 copies in Taiwan, making it the second highest-selling album by a female solo artist and the fourth highest-selling album overall during 2003. The album earned an IFPI Hong Kong Top Sales Music Award for Top 10 Best Selling Mandarin Albums of the Year in 2003.

== Track listing ==
1. "神奇" (Magical)
2. "我不難過" (I Am Fine)
3. "永遠" (Forever)
4. "未完成" (To Be Continued)
5. "接下來" (Following)
6. "學會" (Learnt)
7. "年輕無極限" (Youth Without Limit)
8. "了解" (To Know)
9. "休止符" (A Rest)
10. "沒有人的方向" (A Direction Without Anyone)
11. "My Story, Your Song" feat. Mai Kuraki

== Charts ==
=== Weekly charts ===
Chart (2003)	Peak position
Singaporean Albums (RIAS)	2

=== Year-end charts ===
Chart (2003)	Position
Taiwanese Albums	4

== Sales ==
Region	Certification	Certified units/sales
China	—	1,000,000

== See also ==
- List of best-selling albums in China
