= Ming Bridges =

Ming Bridges 喬毓明
- Born: Yee Ming Innes Bridges; 5 November 1992 (age 34); Australia
- Origin: Singapore
- Genre: Pop
- Occupations: Singer-songwriter, actress, model
- Instruments: Vocals, guitar, piano
- Years active: 2005–present
- Label: Funkie Monkies Productions
- Website: Official website

Yee Ming Innes Bridges (Chinese: 喬毓明; pinyin: Qiáo Yùmíng) (born 5 November 1992) is a British-Singaporean singer-songwriter, actress and model.

== Early life and education ==
Ming was born in Australia to a British father and a Chinese Singaporean mother. They moved to Singapore when she was six months old. Growing up, she lived in Singapore for 16 years and studied at the Tanglin Trust School before moving to England. At 17, she received a performing arts scholarship to study at Wellington College, where she earned her International Baccalaureate diploma in 2011. She briefly attended King's College London, studying business management before deciding to defer her studies in pursuit of a music career.

== Acting and modelling career ==
In 2006, at age 13, Bridges won Teenage magazine's Teenage Icon singing competition. In 2008, she played a lead role, Roxy, on the kids detective drama R.E.M.: The Next Generation, which aired in Singapore on the Okto channel's Kids Central, and won Best Children's Programme at the 2008 Asian Television Awards. Subsequently, she took on the role of Christine in MediaCorp Channel 5's drama series Red Thread that same year. After finishing her International Baccalaureate diploma in London, she moved back to Singapore to pursue a singing career. In 2012, she appeared on Channel 8's variety show It's a Small World III alongside a multi-national panel, to discuss issues of foreigners living in Singapore. In 2013, she appeared in the Chinese horror film "Ghost Child" as Shirley, and on the reality TV series Date A Star II, which sets up celebrities on dates with other celebrities and airs in Singapore on Channel U.

Bridges appeared as a cover model on the July 2013 issue of Shape Singapore and the January 2014 issue of FHM Malaysia.

== Music career ==
Bridges was signed to Funkie Monkies Productions in 2011 after she performed her song "I Want You Back" for its directors, Luqman Taufeek and Fahim Fadzil. She has said this was the first time she played one of her songs for anyone. The song, which she wrote when she was 14, became her first single, released in November 2011. In February 2012, she released her first album, Who Knows, featuring nine songs in English and three in Mandarin.

Yǒuxiē Nánhái Bùnéng Ài (有些男孩不能爱, "Some Guys") reached number 8 on Y.E.S. 93.3 FM, Mǎsàikè Shìjiè (马赛克世界, "Mosaic World") made it into the top 10 on Y.E.S. 93.3 FM, and "Under The Stars" charted on Hot FM 91.3. In December 2012, Bridges released her second album, Ming Day - 明天, an all-mandarin album. Lèi Ruò Yǔ Xià (泪若雨下) reached number 2 on Y.E.S. 93.3 FM.

Ming received the 2012 Music Act of the Year award from Elle Singapore magazine and the My Incredible Teen Icon award at the 2013 M:idea Youth Choice Awards. She also received two awards at the 2013 Singapore Entertainment Awards, for Best Local Singer, and Best Local Album for Ming Day. In 2012, she took part in CCTV Beijing's Starry Starry Night concert. On 26 September 2013, she became the first Singaporean artist to perform on MTV Sessions, playing a set of seven of her songs in English and Mandarin, plus a cover of Selena Gomez's "Love You Like a Love Song," at Harbourfront Studios at the Resorts World Sentosa.

In January 2014, her third album, Morphosis, was released, consisting entirely of songs in English, all of which she composed. The album's first single was "Summertime Love". The second single, "You and I", was first performed on MTV Sessions.

== Discography ==
=== Albums ===
Year	Title
2012	Who Knows: Released: 2 February 2012; Label: Funkie Monkies Productions, Warner/Chappell Music (Beijing); Formats: CD, digital download
2012	Ming Day: Released: 18 December 2012; Label: Funkie Monkies Productions; Formats: CD, digital distribution
2014	Morphosis: Released: 3 January 2014; Label: Funkie Monkies Productions; Formats: CD, digital distribution
2015	Beautiful Melody: Released: 14 September 2015; Label: Avex; Formats: CD, digital distribution

=== Singles ===
Year	Title
2012	"I Want You Back": Released: 18 January 2012; Label: Funkie Monkies Productions, Warner/Chappell Music (Beijing); Formats: Digital download
2013	"Summertime Love": Released: 9 September 2013; Label: Funkie Monkies Productions; Formats: Digital distribution

== Television / film ==
Year	Series	Role	Notes	Ref
2008–09	R.E.M.: The New Generation	Roxy	Two seasons	
2008	Red Thread	Christine		
2012	It's A Small World III	Herself, guest appearance		
2013	Ghost Child	Shirley	Chinese horror/thriller film	
2013	Date a Star II	Herself	Reality TV series	

== Awards ==
- Music Act of the Year, Elle Singapore magazine, 2012
- My Incredible Teen Icon, M:idea Youth Choice Awards, 2013
- Best Local Singer, Singapore Entertainment Awards, 2013
- Best Local Album, Ming Day, Singapore Entertainment Awards, 2013
