= Su Rui =

- Born: Su Rui-fen (蘇瑞芬); 13 June 1952 (age 74); Taipei, Taiwan
- Occupation: Singer
- Years active: 1982–present

Chinese name
- Traditional Chinese: 蘇芮
- Simplified Chinese: 苏芮
Transcriptions
Standard Mandarin
- Hanyu Pinyin: Sū Ruì
- Musical career
- Also known as: Julie Su; Julie Sue; Su Jui; Sue Rey
- Genres: Mandopop, Cantopop, J-Pop
- Instrument: Vocals

Su Rui (simplified Chinese: 苏芮; traditional Chinese: 蘇芮; pinyin: Sū Ruì; born 13 June 1952) is a Taiwanese singer. In 1968, Su Rui skipped class to participate in a singing competition and was selected, joining the Zero Chorus to sing Western pop songs, and began her singing career. Later, she joined the Action Choir, named Julie in English. In 1971, she graduated from high school and began to perform at the Qingquangang American Army Club (CCK) in Taichung with Yingying Huang and they became friends. In 1973, she became the first female singer in residence at the Taipei Hilton. She was recommended to perform at the Hilton Hotel in Hong Kong, singing in Hong Kong for 3 years. Before becoming a singer, Su Rui wanted to be a physical education teacher. At that time, she was good at track and field and basketball, so she hoped to be a teacher and teach students.

Her song "The Same Moonlight" (一樣的月光; 1983) first propelled her from an unknown to a singing sensation in Taiwan overnight when it was released in 1983. She is also known for her hit "Any Empty Wine Bottles For Sale" (酒矸倘賣無), the widely popular soundtrack to the Taiwanese film Papa, Can You Hear Me Sing. Her popularity in Asia was equated with that of counterpart Teresa Teng, when her hit song "Follow Your Feelings" (跟着感覺走) became hugely popular in the late 1980s.

Su released her album That's How Love Came (愛就這麼來) in 1998. She experienced a new surge of popularity during 1998 and 1999, when one of the songs from this album, "Appearance" (容顏), was featured as the ending theme song to the Channel 8 TV drama series, Legend of the Crow. This album also featured a duet with A-Mei, "River" (河), a tribute to Chang Yu-sheng who had just passed away the year before.

In 2018, Su received the Special Contribution Award at the 29th Golden Melody Awards for her achievement in Mandopop music.

== Discography ==
Compilations are excluded from this list

UFO Records (飛碟唱片, Taiwan); titles of editions released by UFO Records are used, unless otherwise

- 1983 — Su Rui (蘇芮; Sū Ruì)
  The earliest Taiwanese cassette edition titles this album The Same Moonlight / Please Come with Me (一樣的月光 / 請跟我來)
- 1984 — Turning Around Suddenly (驀然回首; Mòrán huíshǒu)
- 1984 — Sū Ruì 3 (蘇芮3)
  The earliest Taiwanese CD edition titles this album Shùn Qí Zì Rán / Chén Yuán (順其自然 / 塵緣)
- 1985 — Yǒuqíng tiāndì (有情天地)
- 1985 — 1986
  Sometimes it is called Sū Ruì 1986 (蘇芮1986)
- 1986 — Millionaires Express / Heart of Dragon (富貴列車 / 龍的心; Lóng de xīn / fùguì lièchē) (single)
  Each song is a theme song of a film of the same name
- 1986 — The Sixth Sense (第六感; Dì liù gǎn)
- 1987 — Rest, Work, Work Again (休息、工作、再工作; jau1 sik1, gung1 zok3, zoi3 gung1 zok3) (Cantonese)
- 1987 — Changes (English)
- 1988 — Suna no fune (砂の船) (Japanese)
- 1988 — Taipei–Tokyo (台北·東京; Táiběi·Dōngjīng)
- 1988 — All for Tomorrow (一切為明天; Yīqiè wéi míngtiān)
- 1989 — With Love (憑著愛; pang4 zoek6 ngoi3) (Cantonese)
- 1989 — I've Got the Music in Me (English)
- 1993 — Holding Hands (牽手; Qiānshǒu)
- 1994 — Unfaithful (變心; Biànxīn)

Linfair Records Ltd (福茂唱片)

- 1989 — Murder on the Orient Express (東方快車謀殺案; Dōngfāng kuàichē móushā àn)
- 1990 — Parked in My Gentle Heart (停在我心裏的溫柔; Tíng zài wǒ xīnlǐ de wēnróu)

Golden Pony Records (嘉音唱片)

- 1993 — Loved Completely 愛過就是完全; ngoi3 guo3 zau6 si6 jyun4 cyun4) (Cantonese)

Forward Music Ltd (豐華唱片)

- 1997 — Flower Branches (花若離枝; Huā ruò lí zhī)
- 1998 — Loving You So Much Since (愛就這麼來; Ài jiù zhème lái)

=== Collaborations ===
- 2006 - "I Wanna Understand You More" (我想更懂你), duet with Will Pan from Around the World (Mandarin, English) (Universal Music Taiwan)
