= Leave (album) =

Studio album by Stefanie Sun
- Released: 21 May 2002
- Genre: Mandopop
- Language: Chinese
- Label: Warner

Stefanie Sun chronology
Start (2002)	Leave (2002)	To Be Continued... (2003)

Leave is the fifth studio album by Singaporean singer Stefanie Sun (simplified Chinese: 孙燕姿; traditional Chinese: 孫燕姿), released on 21 May 2002 by Warner Music Taiwan. The song, "We Will Get There" is the theme song of the Singapore National Day Parade 2002. The album earned an IFPI Hong Kong Top Sales Music Award for Top 10 Best Selling Mandarin Albums of the Year in 2002.

== Track listing ==
1. "作戰" (Fight)
2. "我不愛" (I Don't Love)
3. "懂事" (Sensible)
4. "直來直往" (Straight Forward)
5. "一樣的夏天" (Summer as Usual)
6. "愛從零開始" (Love Starts from the Beginning)
7. "不同" (Difference)
8. "眼神" (Wink)
9. "我想" (I Wish)
10. "Leave"

Bonus tracks

1. "We Will Get There"
2. "一起走到" (We Will Get There)
