= Kepler (Stefanie Sun album) =

Studio album by Stefanie Sun
- Released: 27 February 2014
- Genre: Mandopop
- Length: 42:54
- Language: Chinese
- Label: Universal

Stefanie Sun chronology
It's Time (2011)	Kepler (2014)	No. 13 – A Dancing Van Gogh (2017)

Singles from Kepler
- 1. "Kepler" Released: 18 February 2014; 2. "Angel’s Fingerprints" Released: 27 February 2014; 3. "Infinite Possibilities" Released: 18 March 2014; 4. "Best Days of My Youth" Released: 3 April 2014; 5. "Thirst" Released: 18 April 2014

Kepler (Chinese: 克卜勒) is the twelfth studio album by Singaporean singer Stefanie Sun. It was released on 27 February 2014, by Universal Music Taiwan. On 13 January 2015, this album was released as a vinyl record limited to 1,500 sets.

== Background ==
Stefanie Sun participated in the entire production of the album along with Peter Lee and Paul Lee. The album was her first album to be released after giving birth in 2012, thus using music to mark the journey in her life stages. With the precious experience of being a first time mother, she incorporated deeper life thinking, a broader perspective on life, and more sophisticated musical skills into this record.

== Commercial performance ==
It sold more than 36,000 copies in Taiwan, becoming the fifth highest selling album in Taiwan that year along with the year's second highest-selling album by a female artist behind Jolin Tsai's Play. The album's title track helped Stefanie become nominated for Producer of the Year, Single at the 26th Golden Melody Awards.

== Track listing ==
No.	Title	Length
1.	"克卜勒" (Kepler)
2.	"渴" (Thirst)
3.	"無限大" (Infinite Possibilities)
4.	"尚好的青春" (Best Days of My Youth)
5.	"天使的指紋" (Angel's Fingerprints)
6.	"銀泰" (Yin Tai)
7.	"圍繞" (Revolve)
8.	"錯覺" (Mirage)
9.	"比較幸福" (Happier)
10.	"雨還是不停地落下" (It Doesn't Stop Raining)

== Charts ==
=== Weekly charts ===
Chart (2014)	Peak position
Chinese Albums (Sino Chart)	1
Hong Kong Albums (HKRMA)	1
Taiwanese Albums (G-Music)	1

=== Year-end charts ===
Chart (2014)	Position
Taiwanese Albums (G-Music)	5
