= Eric Ng =

Singaporean musicican (born 1975)

- Born: 27 December 1975 (age 50); Singapore
- Occupations: Music producer; music arranger; guitarist; songwriter
- Years active: 1996–present
- Spouse: Chia Li Juan (m. 2012)
- Children: 1
- Musical career
- Genres: Mandopop; pop rock; rock music; R&B
- Instruments: Electric guitar; bass guitar; keyboards; drums

Chinese name
- Traditional Chinese: 黃韻仁
- Simplified Chinese: 黄韵仁
- Hanyu Pinyin: Huáng Yùnrén

Eric Ng (born 27 December 1975) is a Singaporean Mandarin pop music songwriter, music producer and music arranger, and session/touring guitarist. He is also the founder of Funkie Monkies Productions and The Songwriter Music College.

== Early life ==
Eric was born and raised in Singapore. At the age of 17, he started learning guitar, bass, drums and piano on his own, and started playing in bands because of his love for the band Guns ‘n’ Roses. Eric's passion and love for music has helped him gain confidence from early teens.

== Career ==
=== Songwriter and producer ===
Eric's first song “Yi Ge Ren Sheng Huo 一個人生活” (by Diana Yang) was published in 1998. Within the next year, he began to publish numerous songs with Ronald Cheng, Leo Ku, Jordan Chan, Daniel Chan, Angelica Lee, Valen Hsu, Cass Phang, etc. While continue writing hit songs for top selling singers like Karen Mok, Rene Liu, and Wakin Chau, Eric also started to take on more challenges in arrangement and production.

In 2001, Eric wrote “First Class Entertainment A級娛樂” for A-mei, and “Paper Aeroplane 紙飛機” for Sandy Lam; both were incredibly successful hits, followed with “Ta Zhi De他值得” (by Victor Wong), and “Zui Hao De Shi 最好的事” (by Sandy Lam). In 2003, Eric wrote three hits for Fish Leong “For your own good 為我好”, “The Intruder 第三者”, and “I am not Afraid 我不害怕” that received great popularity. With the remarkable success of the song “Deep 無底洞” written for Tanya Chua 蔡健雅, Eric has elevated to a new career high, and was awarded with 2003 Pepsi Music Chart Best Composer. He also wrote several songs for Stefanie Sun including “Can’t be with you 不能和你一起” and “Wei Zhi De Jing Cai 未知的精采”, the theme song for FAW Group's Vizi.

In 2005, he wrote “Yi Zhuan Yi Wa 一磚一瓦”, the theme song for Hands United Program by Cathay Pacific Air and Habitat for Humanity to fundraise for the Indian Ocean tsunami victims. Eric's ability to write songs that reach and stay in the charts were repeatedly demonstrated by songs like “Invisible 隱形人” (by Stefanie Sun), and “Amphibian 雙棲動物” (by Tanya Chua), “Hostage 人質” (by Amei), etc.

He is recognised as the launchpad for multiple hits for artists such as A-Mei, Sandy Lam, Tanya Chua, Jaycee Chan and Ming Bridges. His other work includes jingles for Samsung, Super and other brands, and performing regularly as a session guitarist for artists such as Sandy Lam and Wakin Chau, staging shows from Taiwan, Japan, Malaysia to London, America, Canada and China.

Never resting on his laurels, Eric moved into movies and musicals locally and internationally. His role as music director for Singapore hit movie <881>, composing for musicals such as Nanyang, Lao Jiu the Musical, Liao Zhai Rocks, (Singapore/Shanghai) and writing theme songs for “Voice of China - Turn you around” (China), and “Shockwave” starring Andy Lau (Hong Kong) etc. helped to elevate the value of music in these productions. The Original Soundtrack of <881> topped sales charts creating waves as the top selling movie soundtrack in Singapore history.

=== Music entrepreneur ===
Being the music entrepreneur, Eric founded Funkie Monkies Productions together with lyricist Xiaohan, with the vision of discovering and grooming the next generation of hit makers. As its success grew, Eric expanded Funkie Monkies to include a music publishing department, and a pop music school that also includes a production house and artist management. Starting in 2007, Funkie Monkies has been housing producers and songwriters penning hits for Stefanie Sun, Nicky Lee, Aaron Yan, etc. More than 95% of their exclusive writers were signed after attending the songwriting courses.

Currently, Funkie Monkies songwriters have had their works published by A-list Mandarin artists such as A-mei, Stefanie Sun, Jolin Tsai, Show Lo and the label has successfully launched the careers of Wu Jiahui, Serene Koong, Ming Bridges and Kenny Khoo. It is also one of the Top 6 highest grossing music publishers recognized by Warner Chappell Music, Hong Kong Limited Taiwan Branch. Branching into formal education to train industry ready music makers, Eric further established The Songwriter Music College together with mm2 Asia for the next wave of singer songwriters and songwriter producers. The Songwriter Music College differs from Funkie Monkies in that it provides programs that offer official music diplomas.

Eric is also involved in teaching songwriting at The Songwriter Music College and Funkie Monkies Pop Music School in the belief of helping aspiring musicians take a step closer to their dreams.

=== Other appearances ===
Eric frequently appears on singing and songwriting competition shows as a judge, consults with brands such as Guinness on enhancing its brand image through music, and participates in global songwriting camps.

Eric made an appearance as an audience member at Paya Lebar Quarter to support his daughter Lyla, who was a contestant in the 2023's singing competition Battle of the Buskers.

== Selected discography ==
Title	Performer	Year
一個人生活	Diana Yang	1998
他在屋頂唱歌	Amanda Lee	1998
A級娛樂	Amei Chang	2001
紙飛機	Sandy Lam	2001
最好的事	Sandy Lam	2001
為我好	Fish Leong	2003
第三者	Fish Leong	2003
我不害怕	Fish Leong	2003
無底洞	Tanya Chua	2003
Sorry	Jacky Cheung	2004
雙棲動物	Tanya Chua	2005
隱形人	Stefanie Sun	2005
人質	Amei Chang	2006
分開	Faith Yang	2006
不能和你一起	Stefanie Sun	2007
複製人	Jam Hsiao	2011
慢慢習慣(Theme song for movie “Shockwave”)	Andy Lau	2017
Will You Remember Me	Nicky Lee	2017
聰明傻瓜	Aaron Yan	2018
煉金術	Shin (from band Shin)	2019

=== Film and musical ===
Year	Title	Medium	Country	Role
2007	881	Movie	Singapore	Music Director/Composer/Arranger
2010	Love Cuts	Movie	Singapore	Music Director/Composer/Arranger
2010	‘Breakup Club'	Movie	Singapore	Music Director/Composer/Arranger
2012	‘Liao Zhai Rocks’	Musical	Singapore	Music Director/Composer/Arranger
2012	Theme Song for ’Imperfect'	Movie	Singapore	Music Director/Composer/Arranger
2013	Voice of China - Turn you around	Movie	China	Music Director/Composer/Arranger
2017	拆彈專家 Shock Wave - 電影主題曲 - [慢慢習慣]	Movie	Hong Kong	Music Composer

== Filmography ==
=== Judging appearances ===
Year	Title
2014	Project Superstar Season 3
2012	Academia Fantasia (StarHub); 非常好声 (8TV); Music Express (NTU); Youth got Talent! (People's Association)
2011	K 歌2击队(Mediacorp TV8); Music Express (NTU)
2010	‘Live on’ Film competition (Ministry of Health)
2007	Live the Dream (Mediacorp TV5)

== Awards and nominations ==
Year	Award/Nomination
2013	2013 Life! Theatre Awards Straits Times.; Special Mention for Songwriting Award; “Power List 2013” Straits Times
2011	11th Life! Theatre Awards Straits Times; Best original score for Liao Zhai Rocks! (Nominated); 17th Singapore Hit Awards, Best Local Melody Nomination (複製人)
2010	第16届新加坡金曲奖—入围：; 最佳专辑制作人奖 - 房祖名《乱》; 最佳本地作曲奖 - 房祖名《假动作》; Diageo Marketing Brilliance Awards for Guinness “Live! Unplugged!”
2007	新加坡词曲版权协会奖-- 《双栖动物》赢得‘最佳中文歌曲奖’; “Power List 2007” Straits Times
2005	新加坡词曲版权协会奖—赢得‘青年作曲家奖’
2004	933醉心频道金曲奖--《无底洞》赢得‘最佳编曲奖’
2003	百事风云榜（上海）--《无底洞》赢得‘最佳作曲奖; The Association of Music Workers in Taiwan, Top 10 Quality Album Production (陌生人)
2002	The Association of Music Workers in Taiwan, Top 10 Quality Single (紙飛機)
