= My Desired Happiness =

Studio album by Stefanie Sun
- Released: 7 December 2000
- Genre: Mandopop
- Language: Chinese
- Label: Warner

Stefanie Sun chronology
Yan Zi (2000)	My Desired Happiness (2000)	Kite (2001)

My Desired Happiness (Chinese: 我要的幸福) is the second studio album by Singaporean singer Stefanie Sun (simplified Chinese: 孙燕姿; traditional Chinese: 孫燕姿), released on 7 December 2000 by Warner Music Taiwan.

== Track listing ==
1. "On the Road (Demo 1)"
2. "我要的幸福" (My Desired Happiness)
3. "壞天氣" (Bad Weather)
4. "零缺點" (Perfect)
5. "開始懂了" (Realize)
6. "中間地帶" (Central Zone)
7. "相信" (Believe)
8. "累贅" (Drag)
9. "難得一見" (Only Chance)
10. "害怕" (Fear)
11. "星期一天氣晴我離開你" (Leaving You on the Sunny Monday)
12. "On the Road (Demo 2)"
