= Start (Stefanie Sun album) =

Studio album by Stefanie Sun
- Released: 1 February 2002
- Recorded: 2001–2002
- Genre: Mandopop
- Length: 46:37
- Language: Chinese, English
- Label: Warner

Stefanie Sun chronology
Kite (2001)	Start (2002)	Leave (2002)

Start is the fourth studio album and first cover album by Singaporean singer Stefanie Sun (simplified Chinese: 孙燕姿; traditional Chinese: 孫燕姿), released on 1 February 2002 by Warner Music Taiwan.

== Track listing ==
1. "Hey Jude" – originally by the Beatles
2. "Silent All These Years" – originally by Tori Amos
3. "橄欖樹" (Olive Tree) – originally by Chyi Yu
4. "沒時間" (Too Little Time) – originally by Karen Mok
5. "Sometimes Love Just Ain't Enough" – originally by Patty Smyth & Don Henley
6. "原來你甚麼都不要" (Nothing You Want) – originally by A–mei
7. "That I Would Be Good" – originally by Alanis Morissette
8. "Venus" – originally by Shocking Blue
9. "Someone"
10. "天空" (Sky) – originally by Faye Wong
11. "就是這樣" (That's the Way It Is)
12. "Up 2U"

== Sales ==
Region	Certification	Certified units/sales
China	—	1,000,000

== See also ==
- List of best-selling albums in China
