= Kite (Stefanie Sun album) =

Studio album by Stefanie Sun
- Released: 9 July 2001
- Genre: Mandopop
- Language: Chinese
- Label: Warner

Stefanie Sun chronology
My Desired Happiness (2000)	Kite (2001)	Start (2002)

Kite (simplified Chinese: 风筝; traditional Chinese: 風箏) is the third studio album by Singaporean singer Stefanie Sun (simplified Chinese: 孙燕姿; traditional Chinese: 孫燕姿), released on 9 July 2001 by Warner Music Taiwan. The album earned an IFPI Hong Kong Top Sales Music Award for Top 10 Best Selling Mandarin Albums of the Year in 2001.

== Track listing ==
1. "綠光" (Green Light)
2. "風箏" (Kite)
3. "任性" (Abandon)
4. "逃亡" (Abscondence)
5. "不是眞的愛我" (You Don't Really Love Me)
6. "眞的" (Really)
7. "練習" (Practice)
8. "愛情字典" (Love Dictionary)
9. "隨堂測驗" (Quiz)
10. "我是我" (That's the Way I Am)
