= Yan Zi (album) =

Studio album by Stefanie Sun
- Released: 9 June 2000
- Recorded: 1999–2000
- Genre: Mandopop
- Length: 41:13
- Language: Chinese
- Label: Warner Music Taiwan

Stefanie Sun chronology
Yan Zi (2000)	My Desired Happiness (2000)

Yan Zi (Chinese: 燕姿) is the debut album by Singaporean singer Stefanie Sun, released on 9 June 2000, by Warner Music Taiwan. Produced by Anthony Bao, Tino Bao, Peter Lee and Paul Lee, it incorporates genres such as pop, chamber pop and rock.

Yan Zi received positive reviews from music critics for its compositions and lyrics. The album swept all major music charts within just ten days of its release and ranked in the top three for eleven consecutive weeks on the charts of Taiwan's two major record stores, Tachung Records and Rose Records. By the end of the year, the cumulative sales in Taiwan for Yan Zi had exceeded 330,000, becoming one of the highest-selling records in Taiwan in 2000. As of September 2006, the album's sales across Asia have exceeded 2.7 million.

Sun won twelve new artist awards for this album, including the Golden Melody Award for Best New Artist at the 12th Golden Melody Awards.

== Background and development ==
In 1998, the soon-to-be chairman of Warner Music Taiwan, Chou Chien-hui, visited Singapore to visit Sammi Cheng at the Lee Wei Song Music Academy, and it was at this time that he discovered Stefanie Sun, who had a unique voice and a solid background in music. The Warner producer immediately offered to sign her, however, Sun's father demanded that if she wanted to concentrate on singing, she had to finish college first. For this reason, Warner Music waited for her for two years. It was not until 2000 that Stefanie Sun successfully signed a contract with Warner Music and officially began her music career.

Sun's first album was co-produced by two pairs of twin brothers: Taiwan's Anthony Bao and Tino Bao, and Singapore's Peter Lee and Paul Lee, each of these two sets of producers had their own lyricist and songwriters who worked together to create the album. Sun recorded the album in the studio by the two groups of musicians double grinding, every time in the studio to record to exhaustion.

== Writing and recording ==
"Turbo" expresses the new human, new power, and new view of love; musically, it is a dynamic and upbeat song she announces with a casual whistle. "Finally" was composed by Peter Lee and written by Kevin Yi; it is an ethereal picturesque love song of the new century. Sun's performance of "Love Certificate" and "Cloudy Day" honestly sings to the depths of simplicity, unlike the kind of gibberish that purposely pretends to be playful, which is a gesture of a singer's maturity. "Love Certificate” is a mellow song, with Paul Lee calmly writing a melodious melody, and Sun stretching out her "lightly made-up" vocals in a calm tone. The song "Cloudy Day" was inspired by Taiwanese folk songs. The undecorated voice whispers in the ear, and the yellowed fragments, the wrinkles of the grandmother, the pain of falling, all flow out with the song and piano accompaniment. "E-Lover" is a guitar-driven pop ballad. "Scultpted Eyebrow" is an upbeat chamber pop song. "Make Peace" is a slow tempo guitar-based song. "Natural" combines power pop and pop-punk elements. "Fine" is a pop ballad that relies heavily on the Spanish guitar. "Leave Me Alone" is a rock song.

== Release and promotion ==
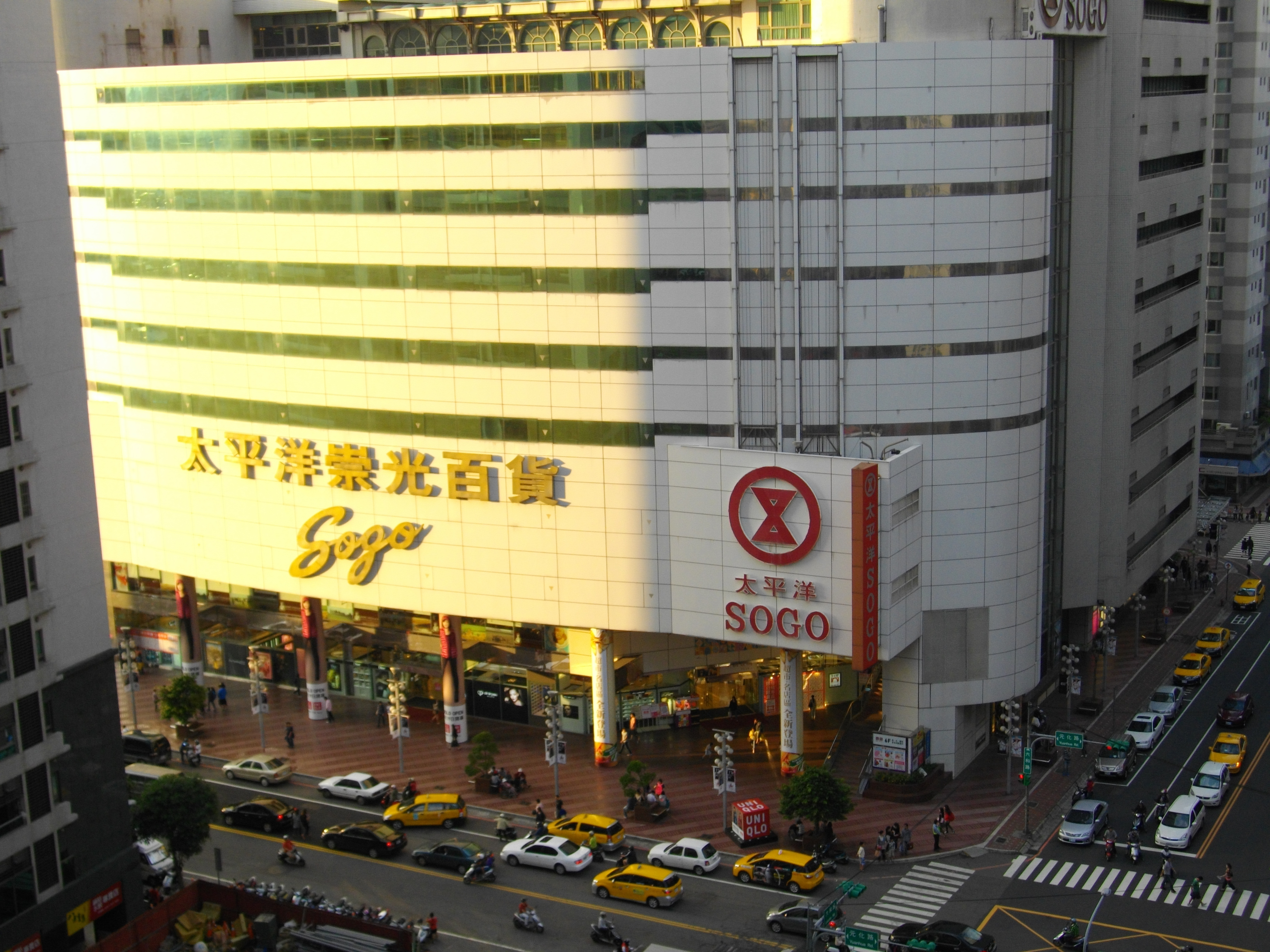
On 14 July 2000, a gunman set off a fake gun at Sun's signing event at the Pacific Sogo Zhongli Store (pictured)

The album's original title track was "Love Certificate," but less than a month before its official release, Warner Music Taiwan's boss Zhou Jianhui made a last-minute decision to change the title track to "Cloudy Day." On 22 May 2000 "Cloudy Day" was officially released.

Warner Music promoted Yan Zi with a variety of advertising campaigns across Asia. In the start, they wanted Sun to be familiar to the public by getting her to shoot the Chunghwa Telecom Pocket Code advertisement, then they asked her to frequently endorse various activities before the release of the album. She then promoted other products such as sanitary pads, sports cars and green tea.

After the album was officially released on 9 June 2000, it remained in the top three on the charts of Taiwan's two major record stores, Popular Records and Rose Records, for 11 consecutive weeks. By the end of July, sales in Taiwan had exceeded 300,000. In order to celebrate these sales, Warner Music took advantage of the hype and released a revised version of the album with a limited edition in early August. It was limited to 30,000 copies and additionally included Stefanie Sun's E-Lover super secretary software and a mouse pad. On 14 July 2000, Sun held a signing event at Pacific Sogo in Zhongli, Taoyuan County, when a man started a disturbance with a gun; fortunately, the man fired a fake gun and no one was injured. In August 2000, Sun went to Hong Kong to help promote her album, where she was interviewed by RTHK. On 2 September 2000, Sun traveled to Beijing to sign albums.

=== Singles and music videos ===
The music video for "Turbo" was directed by Jinhe Lin and revolves around Sun sitting on the roof of a car and driving it on the seaside. The music video for the song "Love Document" was directed by Ma Yizhong and revolves around Sun walking around a loft and outside a window display. The music video for "Cloudy Day," which was also directed by Ma Yizhong, was filmed at a foggy mountain full of reeds. The music videos for "E-Lover" and "Sculpted Eyebrow" were directed by Huang Lijun. The songs, "Love Document" and "Cloudy Day", reached number 4 and 33 respectively on the Hit FM Top 100 Singles of the Year chart for 2000.

== Critical reception ==
Professional ratings
Review scores
Source	Rating
MTVChinese.com	4/5 stars

Mathilda of MTVchinese.com awarded the album four stars out of five and commented: "The first hit is impressive, followed by “Love Certificate” which shows another flavor, and the rock in “Turbo”, which is also well-arranged. It can be crazy, it can be light, it can be cool, it can be gentle. This is what I think of Stefanie Sun after listening to this album. Her voice is very similar to Karen Mok's, but she doesn't sound like she has lost her bite, which makes the album a great effort! Although there are some concerns about her singing: with such a thin body, will she not have enough breath? (you can hear it in the album), this should be something that can be practiced, so I hope to see more improvement! I hope you'll take care of yourself! If you improve your chi, you'll have a bright future, really!"

Dong Wen of Sohu Music commented: "In the summer of 2000, Warner finally released its long-brewing secret newcomer, a 22-year-old girl from Singapore named Sun Yanzi. I was in my sophomore year of high school at the time, and when I grabbed this CD from a girl in my class, I vaguely sensed in my heart the extraordinary nature behind this headstrong voice. The fresh melody, simple lyrics, and the incomparable sincerity of the lyrics captured the innocent me at once. Maybe there is a little bit of virginity in me, I have always insisted that the selection of songs in this album is the best among all of Stefanie Sun's albums, and each song has its own characteristics and pop possibilities."

On 10 June 2020, to celebrate Sun's 20th anniversary in the music industry, Benson Ang of The Straits Times singled out the songs "Cloudy Day," "Love Document," "Turbo" and "Fine" as key songs from Sun's vast discography, commenting that they showcase Sun's sweet, ingenue persona, which over the years has evolved into the confident, charismatic performer she is today.

== Accolades ==
The album earned Sun a Golden Melody Award for Best New Artist. Sun won the Newcomer of the Year award at the 1st TOP Chinese Music Awards, where the track "Cloudy Day" also made it onto the leaderboard of the Top Ten Golden Songs of the Year in Hong Kong and Taiwan. "Cloudy Day" also made it onto the leaderboard of the Taiwan Chinese Musicians Exchange Association's Top Ten "Excellent Singles."

== Track listing ==
No.	Title	Lyrics	Music	Arrangement	Length
1.	"超快感" (Turbo)	Francis Lee; Tino Bao	Tino Bao	Anthony Bao	3:40
2.	"愛情證書" (Love Document)	Jennifer Hsu	Peter Lee	Terence Teo	4:15
3.	"天黑黑" (Cloudy Day)	Kate Liao	Peter Lee	Goh Kheng Long	3:57
4.	"E-Lover"	Li Yao	Tino Bao	Anthony Bao	5:01
5.	"濃眉毛" (Sculpted Eyebrow)	Francis Lee	Yang Junliang	Terence Teo	3:48
6.	"和平" (Make Peace)	Kate Liao	Peter Lee	Terence Teo	4:09
7.	"自然" (Naturally)	Kate Liao	Peter Lee	Martin Tang	3:25
8.	"終於" (Finally)	Kevin Yi	Paul Lee	Goh Kheng Long	4:30
9.	"很好" (Fine)	Jennifer Hsu	Stefanie Sun	Goh Kheng Long	4:28
10.	"Leave Me Alone"	Peter Lee; Kate Liao	Paul Lee	Terence Teo	3:55
Total length:					41:13

== Sales and certifications ==
Sales and certifications for Yan Zi
Region	Certification	Certified units/sales
China	—	200,000
Hong Kong	—	12,000
Malaysia	—	12,000
Singapore (RIAS)	Platinum	17,000
Taiwan	—	330,000
