= Stefanie Sun =

Singaporean singer-songwriter (born 1978)

Sun Yanzi
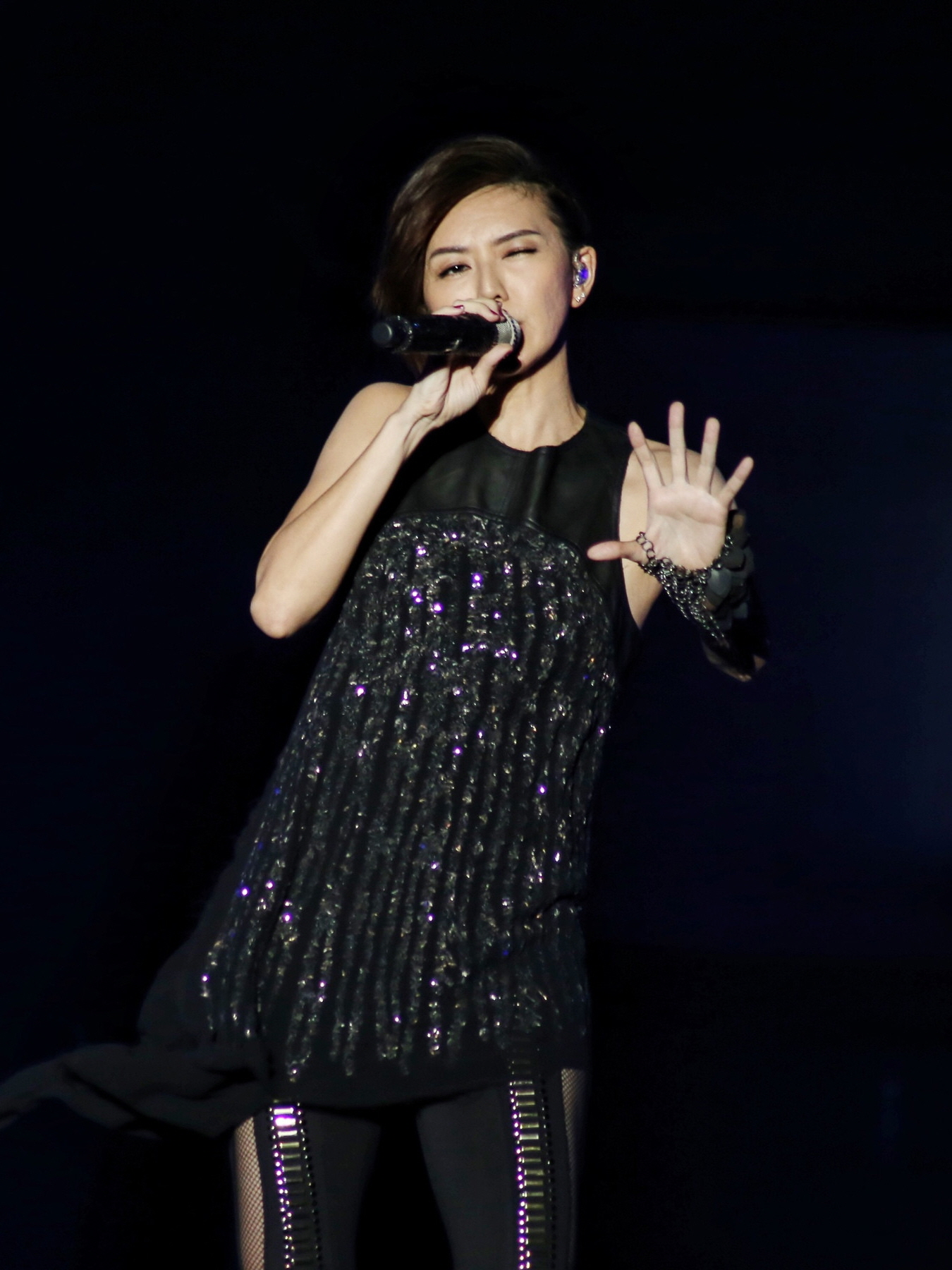
- Sun at a concert in 2016
- Born: Sng Ee Tze; 23 July 1978 (age 48); Singapore
- Education: Nanyang Technological University
- Occupations: Singer; songwriter; record producer; actress
- Years active: 1999–present
- Spouse: Nadim van der Ros (m. 2011)
- Children: 2
- Musical career
- Origin: Singapore
- Genres: Pop; alternative
- Instruments: Vocals, piano
- Labels: Universal; Capitol; Warner

Chinese name
- Simplified Chinese: 孙燕姿
- Traditional Chinese: 孫燕姿
Transcriptions
Standard Mandarin
- Hanyu Pinyin: Sūn Yànzī
Southern Min
- Teochew Peng'im: Sung^{1} In^{3} Ze^{1}

Stefanie Sun Yanzi (Chinese: 孫燕姿; pinyin: Sūn Yànzī; born Sng Ee Tze; (Note: A Singapore Hokkien rendering of her name.) 23 July 1978) is a Singaporean singer and songwriter. Known for her ballads and girl next door image, Sun made her debut with the album Yan Zi in 2000. Featuring the single "Cloudy Day", the album saw immediate success and sold over 330,000 copies in Taiwan and 200,000 copies in China. The album won her various accolades at regional award ceremonies, including the Golden Melody Award for Best New Artist.

Sun's subsequent studio albums My Desired Happiness (2000) and Kite (2001) were also successful, with both selling over 300,000 copies in Taiwan. Her first three albums are all some of the best-selling records in Taiwan in the 21st century. Her compilation album The Moment (2003) sold over 1.5 million copies across Asia and produced the hit single "Encounter". Stefanie (2004) went on to sell over 2.2 million copies across Asia and won her another Golden Melody Award for Best Mandarin Female Singer. By 2007, five of Sun's studio albums had each sold over 1 million copies in mainland China.

One of the best-selling recording artists from Singapore and in the Chinese speaking world, Sun has sold over 30 million albums throughout her career. She has embarked on five concert tours since her debut in 2000, with the Kepler World Tour (2014–2015) attracting a total of over 760,000 people. Her accolades include twenty Singapore Hit Awards, three Golden Melody Awards, five MTV Asia Awards, and five IFPI Hong Kong Top Sales Awards.

== Early life and education ==
Sun was born in Singapore on 23 July 1978. She attended Nanyang Primary School, St. Margaret's Secondary School, Raffles Girls' School, Saint Andrew's Junior College, and Nanyang Technological University, where she obtained a bachelor's degree of Marketing in 2000.

== Singing career ==
=== 2000–2004: Career beginnings and early breakthrough ===
During university, Sun wrote her first song titled "Someone", which later appeared on her 2002 album, Start. She attended LWS School of Music, and her vocal talent was discovered by her mentor Paul Lee, who later introduced her to Samuel Chou, the chairman of Warner Music Taiwan at the time.

In 2002, Hong Kong–based Yazhou Zhoukan, published a 15-page article on the "Stefanie Sun phenomenon", citing the impact of her music all throughout Asia.

Sun was selected to sing the English and Mandarin versions of the Singapore National Day Parade theme songs in 2002 – "We Will Get There" (一起走到) and in 2003 – "One United People" (全心全意).

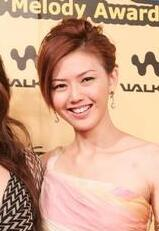
Sun in 2006

=== 2005–2009: A Perfect Day and Against the Light ===
In October 2005, Sun released her studio album A Perfect Day. It sold over 1 million copies in Asia less than a month, and sold more than 100,000 copies in Taiwan, becoming the 10th best-selling album of 2005, as well as the fourth best-selling album by a female artist. In 2006, National Parks Board of Singapore named an orchid, Dendrobium Stefanie Sun, after her.

In March 2007, Sun released her ninth studio album, Against the Light. It went on to sell over 1.5 million units throughout Asia including 130,000 units in Taiwan, becoming the third highest-selling album overall in the country during 2007. The album produced the hit songs "What I Miss" and "Against the Light". In 2009, Stefanie Sun held her third world tour, " The Answer is World Tour ". The production cost for the tour amounted to more than NT$100 million, featuring diamond-shaped cut stages, floating pianos, jellyfish lights, and "light and shadow sculptures".

Sun was named one of the Ten Most Influential Music Figures of the Decade at the Top Chinese Music Awards 10th Anniversary Ceremony, along with artists such as Faye Wong, S.H.E, Karen Mok, Jolin Tsai, and Jay Chou. Her 2003 song "Encounter" was also named one of the Top Ten Golden Songs of the Decade in Hong Kong and Taiwan at the ceremony.

=== 2010–2019: It's Time, Kepler, and No. 13 – A Dancing Van Gogh ===
In 2010, Sun served as the spokesperson for the Singapore Tourism Board. Stefanie Sun revealed that her proudest moments as a singer was when she sang Kwa Geok Choo’s favorite song. Kwa was the wife of Singapore's former prime minister. She also sang Lee Kuan Yew’s favorite, entitled "Que Sera Sera", at the Business China Awards in 2011, not long after her demise. The song had moved Lee, a person whom Sun had the highest respect for, to tears.

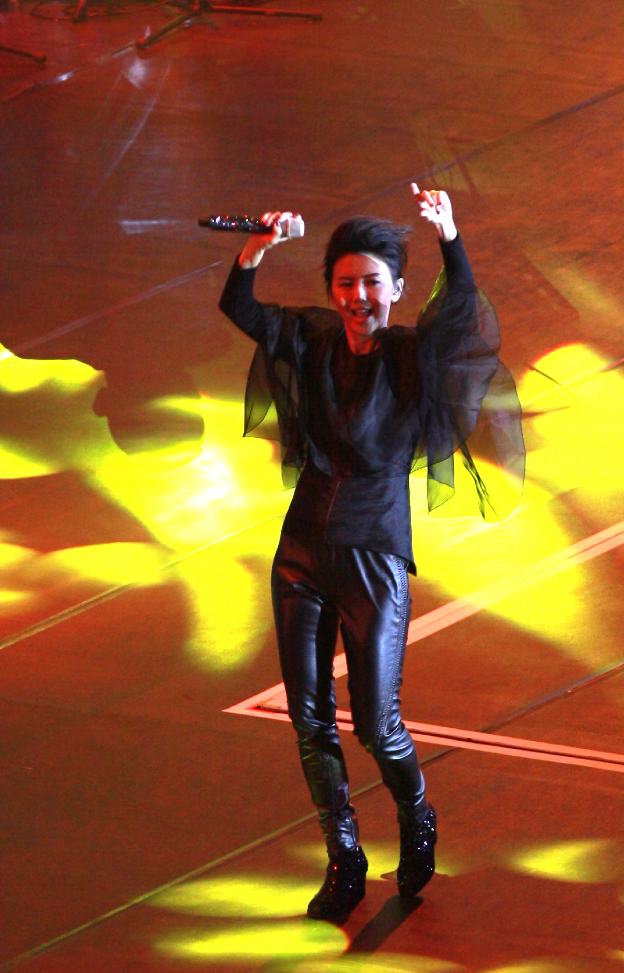
Sun performing in 2016

In February 2014, Sun released her eleventh studio album Kepler. She embarked on the Kepler World Tour in support of the album that same month, which attracted over 760,000 people before its conclusion in July 2015. Sun also has a wax figure of herself at the Madame Tussauds Singapore wax museum which portrays her signature look during her 2014 Kepler World Tour. The wax figure took around four months to make, costing SG$300,000.

=== 2020–present: Aut Nihilo Tour ===
In early January 2020, she collaborated with Taiwanese band, Mayday, to release the new version of their 2000 hit "Tenderness". On 27 May 2022, more than 240 million people watched Sun performed in a one hour virtual concert streamed on Douyin. On 5 April 2025, Sun begun her new world tour after a decade of hiatus.

== Personal life ==
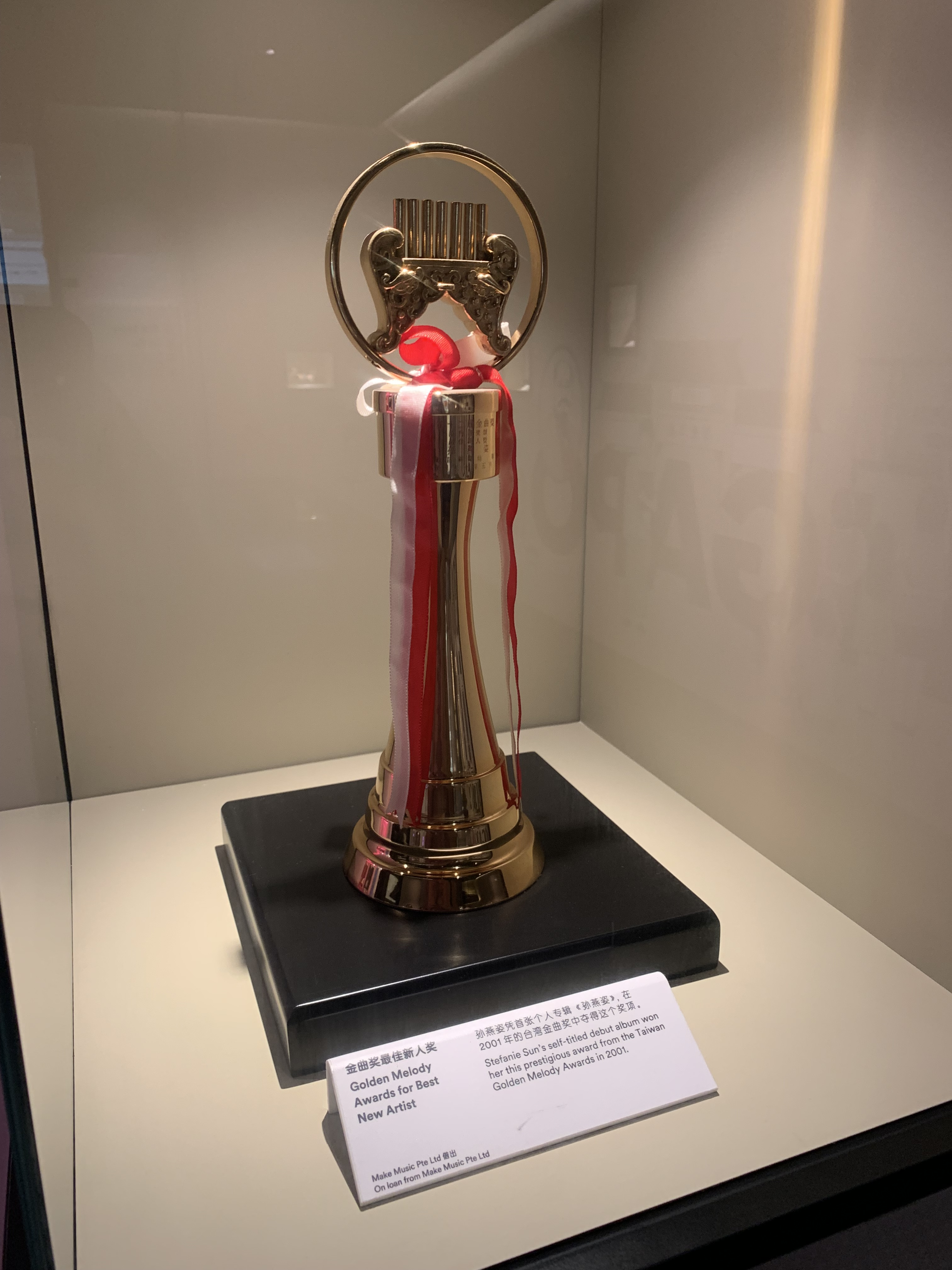
Sun's Golden Melody Award for Best New Artist on display at the Singapore Chinese Cultural Centre

In May 2011, Sun married Nadim van der Ros, who is of a Eurasian Indonesian descent. He is the founder of Be An Idea, a part of The Good Bean Consultancy. They had secretly registered their marriage in March 2011. In October 2012, Sun gave birth to her son, followed by a daughter in July 2018.

== Discography ==
Studio albums

- Yan Zi (2000)
- My Desired Happiness (2000)
- Kite (2001)
- Start (2002)
- Leave (2002)
- To Be Continued... (2003)
- Stefanie (2004)
- A Perfect Day (2005)
- Against the Light (2007)
- It's Time (2011)
- Kepler (2014)
- No. 13 – A Dancing Van Gogh (2017)

== Tours ==
=== Concert tours ===
- Start World Tour (2002–2004)
- Stefanie Sun World Tour Concert (2005–2006)
- The Answer is World Tour (2009–2010)
- Kepler World Tour (2014–2015)
- Aut Nihilo: Sun Yanzi in Concert (2025–2026)

== Filmography ==
=== Film ===
Year	Title	Role	Notes	Ref.
2008	12 Lotus	Goddess of Mercy (opera)	Special appearance	
