= List of public art in Shanghai =

Public art displayed in Shanghai includes:

Image	Title / subject	Location and coordinates	Date	Artist / designer	Type	Designation	Notes
More images	Bund Bull	The Bund	2010	Arturo Di Modica	Statue		
More images	Statue of Charlie Chaplin	New Town Central Park			Statue		
More images	Statue of Chen Yi	Chen Yi Square, The Bund			Statue		
More images	Monument to Frédéric Chopin	Dr Sun Yat-sen Park	2007	Lu Pin	Memorial		
More images	Bust of Mahatma Gandhi	New Town Central Park	1974–1976	Drago Marin Cherina	Bust		
	Hehe Xiexie	Expo Boulevard	2009–2010	Zhang Huan	Sculptures		
More images	Light of the East		2000	Jean-Marie Charpentier	Sculpture		
More images	May Thirtieth Movement Monument	People's Park			Memorial		
More images	Memorial to Karl Marx and Friedrich Engels	Fuxing Park			Sculpture		
More images	Statue of Ma Zhanshan	New Town Central Park			Statue		
More images	Nobility of Time	Changde Road	1977	Salvador Dalí	Sculpture		
More images	Monument to the People's Heroes	The Bund	1993		Memorial		
	The Thinker	Shanghai Library		Auguste Rodin	Statue		
More images	Statue of Zhang Side	People's Park	1952		Statue		

== Jing'an Sculpture Park ==
Jing'an Sculpture Park has the following works on display:

Image	Title / subject	Location and coordinates	Date	Artist / designer	Type	Designation	Notes
More images	Colors of Happiness		2008	Peter Woytuk	Sculpture		
More images	Elemental Spring: Harmony		2010	Barbara Edelstein	Sculpture		
More images	Flying Colors		2007	Georges Saulterre	Sculpture		
More images	Girouette Monumentale		2010	Philippe Hiquily	Sculptures		
More images	Horse		2013	Bahk Seon Chi	Sculpture		
More images	Large Parrot Screams Color		2007	Jim Dine	Sculpture		
More images	Music Power		1988	Arman	Sculpture		
More images	Ostrich—Hide and Seek		2010	LplusL	Sculpture		
More images	Red Beacon			Arne Quinze	Sculpture		

== See also ==
- List of public art in Hong Kong
