= List of public art in Hong Kong =

List of public artworks in Hong Kong

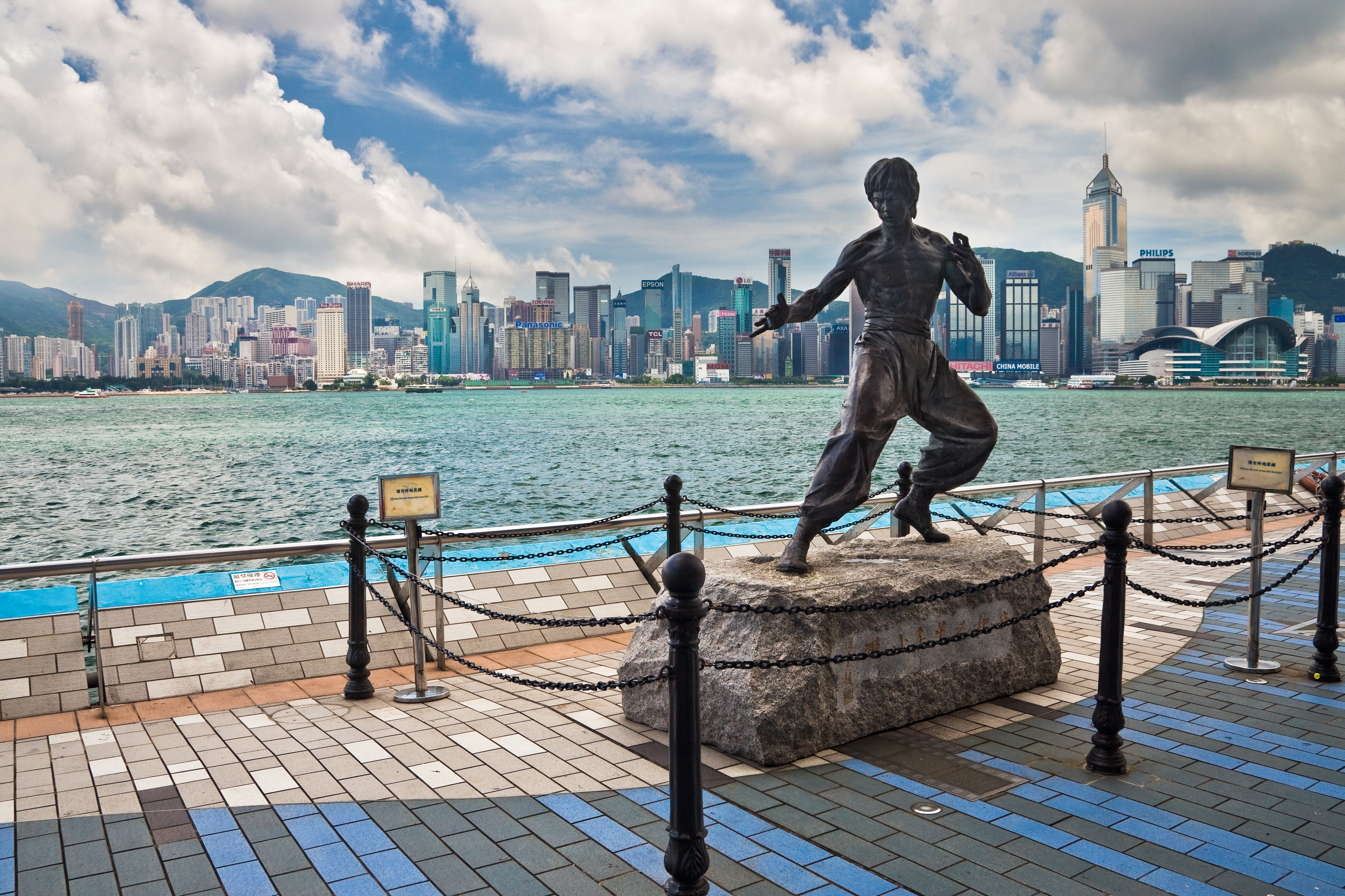
Statue of Bruce Lee

Public artworks in Hong Kong include:

- Chinese War Memorial
- The Flying Frenchman
- Hong Kong Film Awards statue
- HSBC lions
- Lady Liberty Hong Kong
- Pillar of Shame
- Statue of Anita Mui
- Statue of Bruce Lee
- Statue of George VI
- Statue of McDull
- Statue of Queen Victoria
- Statue of Sir Thomas Jackson, 1st Baronet
- Three Heads Six Arms

== See also ==
- List of public art in Shanghai
