= Čerina =

Čerina is a Croatian surname. Notable people with the name include:

- Drago Marin Čerina (born 1949), Croatian Australian sculptor
- Igor Čerina (born 1988), Croatian footballer
- Marin Čerina (born 1995), Croatian sports shooter
- Vladimir Čerina (1891–1932), Croatian writer
