= List of JJ Lin concert tours =

JJ Lin concert tours
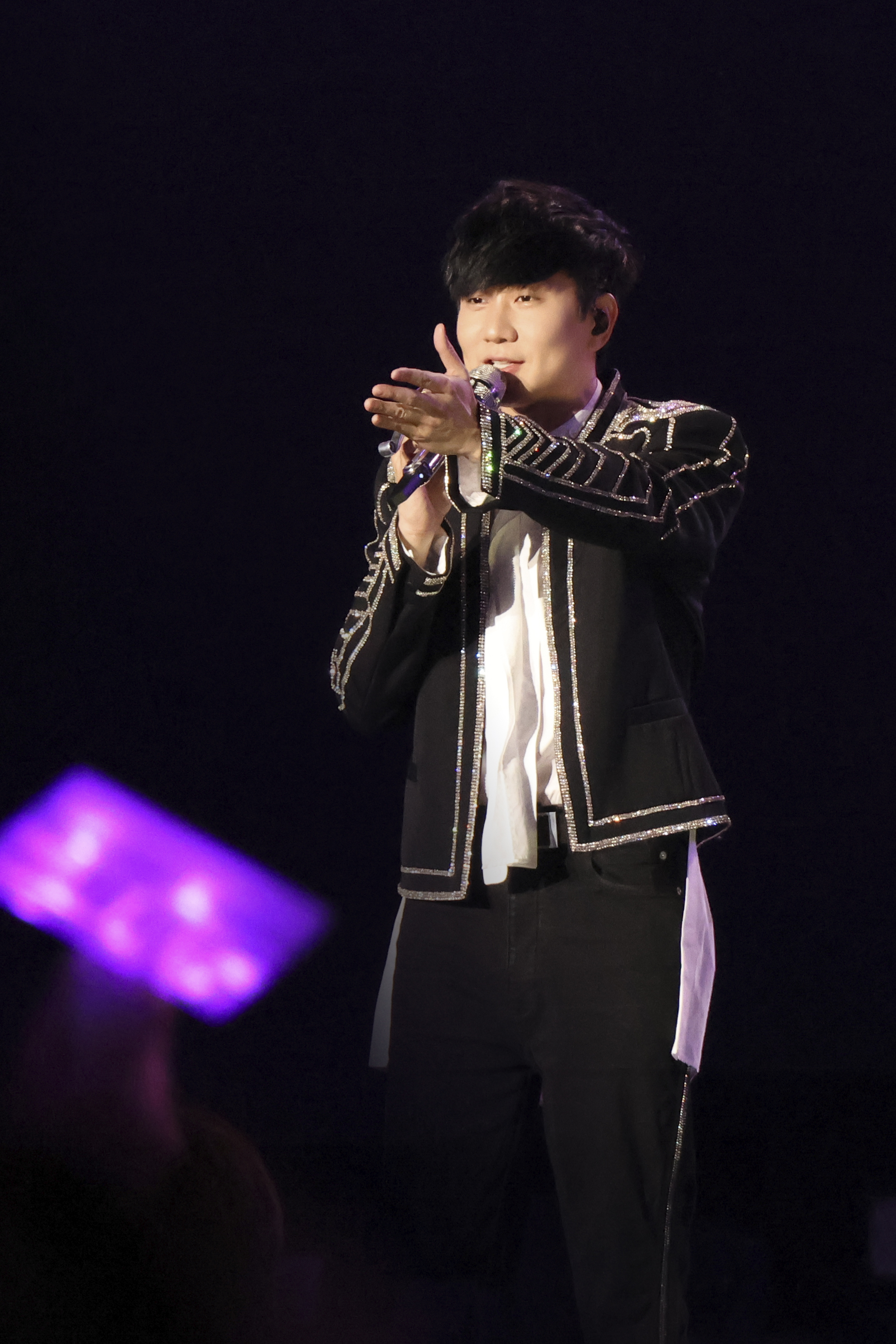
- Lin in 2023
- Concert tours: 6
- One-off concerts: 6
- Online concerts: 5

This is a list of concert tours by Singaporean singer and songwriter JJ Lin.

== Just JJ World Tour ==
JJ Lin Just JJ World Tour 就是俊杰世界巡回演唱会
- World tour by JJ Lin
- Location: Asia
- Associated album: No. 89757; Cao Cao
- Start date: 10 June 2006
- End date: 14 October 2007
- No. of shows: 7

JJ Lin concert chronology
- Just JJ World Tour (2006–2007); JJ Lin World Tour 2009 (2009)

Just JJ World Tour (Chinese: 就是俊杰世界巡回演唱会) is the first concert tour by JJ Lin, with a total of seven performances.

Set list

Set list in Singapore

This set list is representative of the show on 24 June 2006, in Singapore.

Act 1

1. "The Mummy"
2. "No.89757"
3. "WIngs"
4. "Truth"
5. "Simply"

Act 2

6. "Tomorrow"
7. "Thou Shall Not Steal"
8. "I'm The One"
9. "Unbelievable" (Jin Sha)
10. "Summer Breeze" (feat. Jin Sha)
11. "Smiling Eyes"
12. "When You"
13. "Follow me"
14. "Remember"
15. "Beatbox & Taiko drum"
16. "Gibberish"
17. "Perfection"
18. "Black Humor"
19. "The One And Only"
20. "Heal The World"
21. "I DO" (feat. A-do)
22. "Helpless" (A-do)
23. "He Loves You Very Much" (A-do)

Act 3

24. "Haven"
25. "Bullet Train"
26. "Metamorphosis"
27. "Mermaid"
28. "Perfect Match"
29. "Sign Waves"
30. "A Thousand Years Later"

Encore

31. "Cao Cao"
32. "Sarang Heyo"
33. "River South"

List of concert dates
Date	City	Country	Venue
10 June 2006	Shanghai	China	Hongkou Football Stadium
24 June 2006	Singapore		Singapore Indoor Stadium
1 July 2006	Genting Highlands	Malaysia	Arena of Stars
16 September 2006	Wuhan	China	Xinhua Road Sports Center Stadium
30 September 2006	Tianjin	China	TEDA Football Stadium
29 December 2006	Taipei	Taiwan	Taipei Arena
14 October 2007	Shanghai	China	Hongkou Football Stadium

== JJ World Tour 2009 ==
JJ Lin World Tour 2009 杰伴2009世界巡回演唱会
- World tour by JJ Lin
- Location: Asia
- Associated album: Sixology
- Start date: 28 March 2009
- End date: 20 June 2009
- No. of shows: 2

JJ Lin concert chronology
- Just JJ World Tour (2006–2007); JJ World Tour 2009 (2009); I AM World Tour (2010–2011)

JJ World Tour 2009 (Chinese: 杰伴2009世界巡回演唱会) is the second concert tour by JJ Lin. It was interrupted due to damage to JJ Lin's vocal cords, and he only performed two shows.

Set list

Set list in Beijing

This set list is representative of the show on 20 June 2009, in Beijing.

1. "The Choice is Yours"
2. "High Fashion"
3. "Sarang Heyo"
4. "Freeze"
5. "Perfect Match"
6. "Lord Vader"
7. "Eternal Life"
8. "No. 89757"
9. "Courage" (feat. BY2)
10. "DNA" (BY2)
11. "She Came to My Concert"
12. "Hair Was Awry"
13. "You Are Not Alone"
14. "Beat It"
15. "Down Lately"
16. "Hurray"
17. "I'm The One"
18. "Taking Tiger Mountain by Wisdom" (Peking Opera)
19. "We Will Rock You" (feat. Chris Lee)
20. "My Kingdom + The Mummy" (feat. Chris Lee)
21. "Why Me" (Chris Lee)
22. "Love and Hope"
23. "Encounter"
24. "Dimples"
25. "BABY BABY"
26. "The Streets"
27. "The Killa"
28. "Sign Waves"
29. "River South"
30. "Cao Cao"
31. "I Still Miss Her"
32. "A Thousand Years Later"

List of concert dates
Date	City	Country	Venue
28 March 2009	Singapore		Singapore Indoor Stadium
20 June 2009	Beijing	China	Capital Indoor Stadium

== I Am World Tour ==
JJ Lin I Am World Tour I Am世界巡回演唱会
- World tour by JJ Lin
- Location: Asia
- Associated album: Hundred Days; She Says
- Start date: 21 August 2010
- End date: 2 April 2011
- No. of shows: 11

JJ Lin concert chronology
- JJ World Tour 2009 (2009); 'I Am World Tour (2010–2011); Timeline World Tour (2013–2015)

I Am World Tour (Chinese: I AM世界巡回演唱会) is the third concert tour by JJ Lin, with a total of 11 performances.

Set list

Set list of the first show in Taipei

Act 1

1. "Cao Cao"
2. "The Killa"
3. "No.89757"
4. "Freeze"
5. "Back To Back"

Act 2

6. "X
7. "Lord Vader
8. "Haven
9. "Bobee" (Feat. Lotus Wang)
10. "Thank You" (Lotus Wang)
11. "She Says"
12. "Suite" (Lost Sandbar + Parabola + The Outside World + The Sun + Disappear)
13. "Naruwan"
14. "Go!"

Act 3

15. "Obsession"
16. "One By One"
17. "Thriller"
18. "Black or White"
19. "Suddenly missing you" (Feat. Ashin)
20. "Hundred Days" (Feat. Ashin)
21. "Contentment" (Ashin)

Act 4

22. "I AM"
23. "Remember"
24. "Longing"
25. "Perfect Match"

Act 5

26. "Centerstage"
27. "Copycat"
28. "The Streets"
29. "Sign Waves"
30. "River South"

Encore

31. "Dimples"
32. "Smiling Eyes"
26. "High Fashion"
33. "The One"
34. "A Thousand Years Later"

List of concert dates
Date	City	Country	Venue
21 August 2010	Beijing	China	Capital Indoor Stadium
28 August 2010	Shanghai	China	Shanghai Grand Stage
17 September 2010	Chengdu	China	Sichuan Gymnasium
25 September 2010	Guangzhou	China	Guangzhou Gymnasium
15 October 2010	Changsha	China	Helong Sports Center Stadium
6 November 2010	Wuhan	China	Xinhua Road Sports Center Stadium
13 November 2010	Nanjing	China	Wutaishan Gymnasium
12 December 2010	Kunming	China	Kunming Gymnasium
5 March 2011	Singapore		Singapore Indoor Stadium
1 April 2011	Taipei	Taiwan	Taipei Arena
2 April 2011	Taipei	Taiwan	Taipei Arena

== Timeline World Tour ==
JJ Lin Timeline World Tour 时线世界巡回演唱会
- World tour by JJ Lin
- Location: Asia; North America; Europe; Oceania
- Associated album: Stories Untold; Genesis
- Start date: 13 July 2013
- End date: 19 December 2015
- Legs: 2
- No. of shows: 42
- Attendance: 500,000

JJ Lin concert chronology
- I Am World Tour (2010–2011); Timeline World Tour (2013–2015); Sanctuary World Tour (2018–2019)

Timeline World Tour (Chinese: 时线世界巡回演唱会) is the fourth concert tour by JJ Lin, with a total of 42 performances.

Set list

Timeline World Tour on 13 July 2013 in Taipei
1. "Clash of The Souls"
2. "The Mummy"
3. "Royal Dragon Three Kingdoms"
4. "Cao Cao"
5. "Romantic Mystery"
6. "Back To Back"
7. "Frozen Kiss"
8. "Streets of Old Shanghai"
9. "Eternal Life"
10. "Mermaid"
11. "One Shot"
12. "Fear"
13. "Nonexistent"
14. "Never Learn"
15. "Perfect Match"
16. "Dimples"
17. "The Dark Knight"
18. "Somebody (feat. Harry Chang)
19. "Hundred Days"
20. "Billie Jean"
21. "I'm The One"
22. "She Says"
23. "Simply"
24. "Love U U"
25. "Remember"
26. "Practice Love"
27. "Smiling Eyes"
28. "Those Were The Days"
29. "A Thousand Years Later"

Encore

30. "You N Me"
31. "We Together"
32. "High Fashion"
33. "River South"
Timeline: Genesis World Tour on 14 February 2015 in Taipei
1. "She Says"
2. "We Together"
3. "High Fashion"
4. "I'm The One"
5. "Back To Back"
6. "Freeze"
7. "If Only"
8. "Never Learn"
9. "Cao Cao"
10. "Black Keys"
11. "Clash of The Souls"
12. "The Dark Knight" (feat. Ashin)
13. "The Gardens"
14. "Cinderella"
15. "Hundred Days"
16. "Practice Love"
17. "Perfect Match"
18. "The Third Person and I"
19. "Dimples" (feat. Selina Jen)
20. "Brave New World"
21. "Mermaid"
22. "Woo"
23. "Lamando"
24. "You N Me"
25. "Remember"
26. "Simply"
27. "Those Were The Days"
28. "Love U U"
29. "Smiling Eyes"
30. "A Thousand Years Later"

Encore

31. "WIngs"
32. "The Romantic"
33. "River South"
34. "The One"
35. "The Beacon"
Timeline: Genesis World Tour on 19 December 2015 in Kaohsiung
1. "She Says"
2. "We Together"
3. "High Fashion"
4. "Back To Back"
5. "If Only"
6. "Twilight"
7. "Cao Cao"
8. "Black Keys"
9. "The Dark Knight"
10. "Sister" (feat. Jeannie Hsieh)
11. "The Gardens"
12. "Cinderella"
13. "Hundred Days"
14. "Practice Love"
15. "Perfect Match"
16. "Dimples"
17. "Roll On"
18. "Brave New World"
19. "Mermaid"
20. "Woo"
21. "Lamando"
22. "You N Me"
23. "Remember"
24. "By Your Side"
25. "Love U U"
26. "Smiling Eyes"
27. "A Thousand Years Later"

Encore

28. "Adolescent"
29. "The Beacon"
30. "Raindrops"
31. "WIngs"
32. "Sarang Heyo"
33. "Tales of the Red Cliff"
34. "Distance"
35. "Beautiful"
36. "River South"

Encore again

37. "Billie Jean"
38. "I'm The One"

List of concert dates
Date	City	Country	Venue
Timeline World Tour
13 July 2013	Taipei	Taiwan	Taipei Arena
14 July 2013	Taipei	Taiwan	Taipei Arena
27 July 2013	Shenzhen	China	Shenzhen Bay Sports Center Gymnasium
14 September 2013	Guangzhou	China	Guangzhou Gymnasium
28 September 2013	Beijing	China	Capital Indoor Stadium
12 October 2013	Shanghai	China	Mercedes-Benz Arena
26 October 2013	Hong Kong	China	Hong Kong Coliseum
9 November 2013	Singapore		Singapore Indoor Stadium
16 November 2013	Changzhou	China	Zhongtian Steel Gymnasium
24 November 2013	Atlantic City	United States	Borgata Event Center
28 November 2013	Las Vegas	United States	The Colosseum at Caesars Palace
7 December 2013	Kuala Lumpur	Malaysia	Axiata Arena
15 December 2013	Chengdu	China	Sichuan Gymnasium
5 January 2014	Wuhan	China	Wuhan Sports Center Gymnasium
16 February 2014	London	United Kingdom	Wembley Arena
22 March 2014	Macau	China	Cotai Arena
1 May 2014	Tianjin	China	Tianjin Arena
9 May 2014	Sydney	Australia	Sydney Entertainment Centre
10 May 2014	Melbourne	Australia	Melbourne Convention and Exhibition Centre
31 May 2014	Hangzhou	China	Huanglong Gymnasium
15 June 2014	Harbin	China	HICEC Gymnasium
20 September 2014	Nanjing	China	Nanjing Olympic Sports Center Gymnasium
6 December 2014	Nanning	China	Guangxi Sports Center Gymnasium
3 January 2015	Chongqing	China	Chongqing Int'l Convention & Exhibition Center
10 January 2015	Qingdao	China	Conson Gymnasium
Timeline: Genesis World Tour Encore
14 February 2015	Taipei	Taiwan	Taipei Arena
15 February 2015	Taipei	Taiwan	Taipei Arena
11 April 2015	Shanghai	China	Mercedes-Benz Arena
12 April 2015	Shanghai	China	Mercedes-Benz Arena
25 April 2015	Guangzhou	China	Guangzhou International Sports Arena
9 May 2015	Beijing	China	Wukesong Arena
6 June 2015	Xi'an	China	Xi'an City Sports Park Gymnasium
12 June 2015	Hong Kong	China	Hong Kong Coliseum
13 June 2015	Hong Kong	China	Hong Kong Coliseum
15 August 2015	Hefei	China	Hefei Olympic Sports Center Stadium
29 August 2015	Jinan	China	Jinan Olympic Sports Center Gymnasium
5 September 2015	Singapore		Singapore Indoor Stadium
19 September 2015	Nanjing	China	Nanjing Olympic Sports Center Gymnasium
26 September 2015	Nanchang	China	Nanchang International Sports Center Stadium
3 October 2015	Taiyuan	China	Shanxi Province Sports Center Gymnasium
17 October 2015	Chengdu	China	Chengdu Sports Centre
19 December 2015	Kaohsiung	Taiwan	Kaohsiung Arena

List of cancelled dates
Date	City	Country	Venue	Reason
17 January 2015	Zhengzhou	China	Zhengzhou International Convention and Exhibition Centre	2014 Shanghai stampede

== Other live concerts ==
=== JJ Lin Live Concert in Medan ===
Date	City	Country	Venue
17 August 2008	Medan	Indonesia	Mikie Star Theater

=== JJ Lin Melbourne Concert ===
JJ Lin became the first Mandopop singer to hold a concert at the MCEC in Melbourne.

Date	City	Country	Venue
24 April 2010	Melbourne	Australia	Melbourne Convention & Exhibition Centre

=== JJ Lin Christmas Concert ===
Date	City	Country	Venue
25 December 2010	Atlantic City	United States	Circus Maximus Theater

=== JJ Lin Vancouver Concert ===
Date	City	Country	Venue
6 May 2011	Vancouver	Canada	Centre in Vancouver For Performing Arts

=== By Your Side Live Concert ===
Date	City	Country	Venue	Ref.
14 February 2016	Reno	United States	Reno Events Center	
18 February 2016	Vancouver	Canada	Queen Elizabeth Theatre	
22 February 2016	Los Angeles	United States	Shrine Auditorium	

=== After the Rain a Charity Live Special ===
Date	City	Country	Venue	Ref.
27 November 2021	Singapore		Marina Bay Sands Theatre	
28 November 2021	Singapore		Marina Bay Sands Theatre	

== Online concerts ==
=== "Message in a Bottle" Live Stream Concert ===
Date	Venue	Platforms
3 February 2018	JFJ Sanctuary	YouTube; LINE TV; KKBOX; JOOX; Tencent Video; QQ Music; KuGou Music; iQIYI; NetEase Cloud Music; Panda TV

=== "Drifter • Like You Do" Live Stream Concert ===
Date	Venue	Platforms
30 October 2020	JFJ Sanctuary	YouTube; Douyin

=== Sanctuary Finale Virtual Concert ===
Date	Venue	Platforms
10 July 2021	Unknown	SISTIC; QQ Music; KuGou Music; KuWo Music

=== JJ's Bloom n' Tunes Christmas Edition Concert ===
Date	Venue	Platforms
24 December 2022	JFJ Sanctuary	YouTube; Douyin

=== "Happily, Painfully After" Live Stream Concert ===
Date	Venue	Platforms
23 June 2023	Taipei Performing Arts Center	Bilibili
