= Avenue of Stars, Hong Kong =

Coordinates: 22°17′35.15″N 114°10′29.14″E

Avenue of Stars
- Chinese: 星光大道
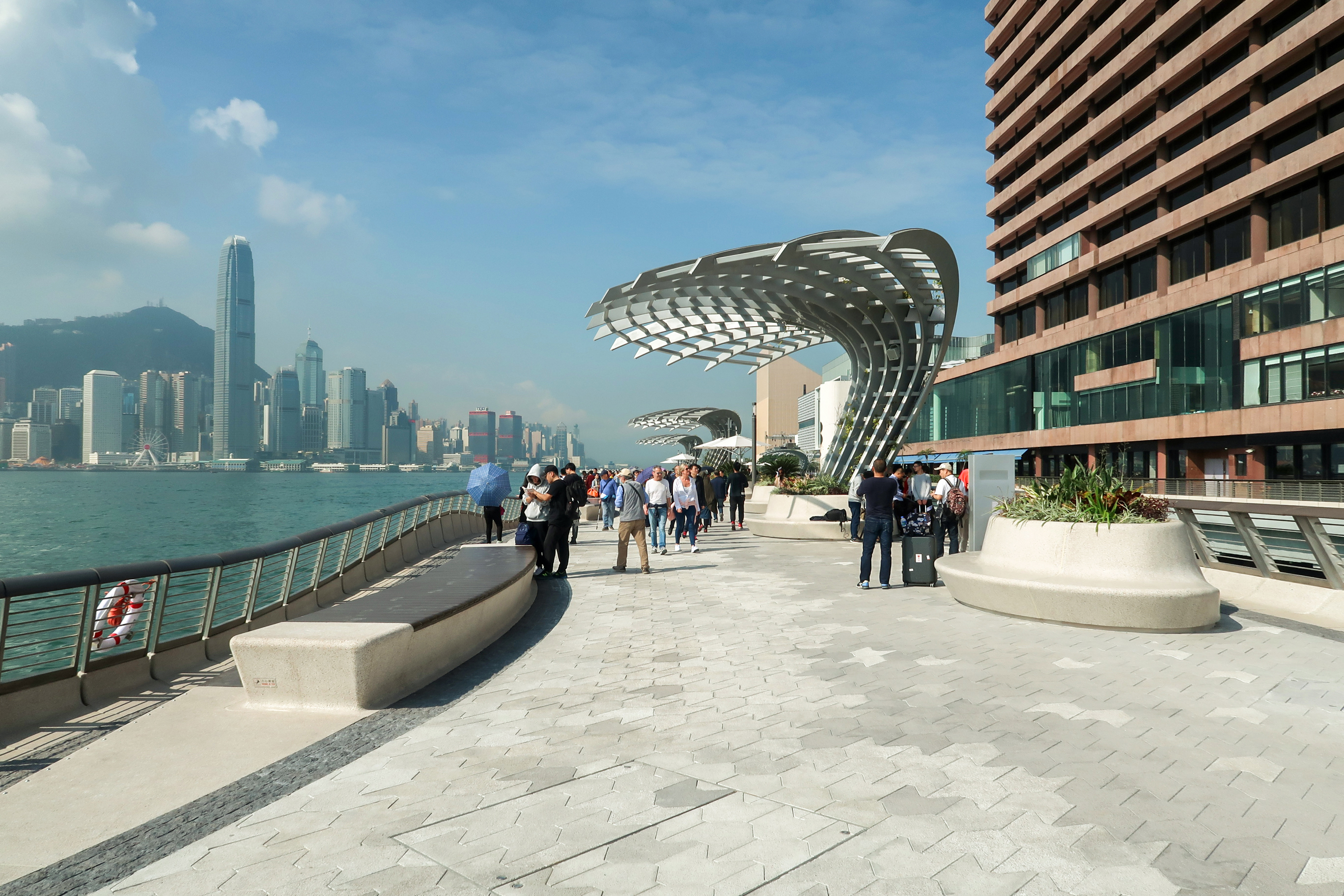
- Established: 1982; 44 years ago
- Location: Tsim Sha Tsui, Hong Kong
- Type: Entertainment hall of fame
- Website: www.avenueofstars.com.hk/en/

Avenue of Stars, Hong Kong
- Chinese: 星光大道
Transcriptions
Standard Mandarin
- Hanyu Pinyin: Xīngguāng Dàdào
- Wade–Giles: Hsingkuang Tatao
- IPA: [ɕíŋkwáŋ tâtâʊ]
Hakka
- Romanization: Sin^{1}gong^{1} Tai^{4}tau^{4}
Yue: Cantonese
- Yale Romanization: Syīnggwāng Dàhdàu
- Jyutping: Sing1gwong1 Daai6dou3

The Avenue of Stars (Chinese: 星光大道), modelled on the Hollywood Walk of Fame, is an avenue located along the Victoria Harbour waterfront in Tsim Sha Tsui, Hong Kong. It honours celebrities of the Hong Kong film industry.

== History ==
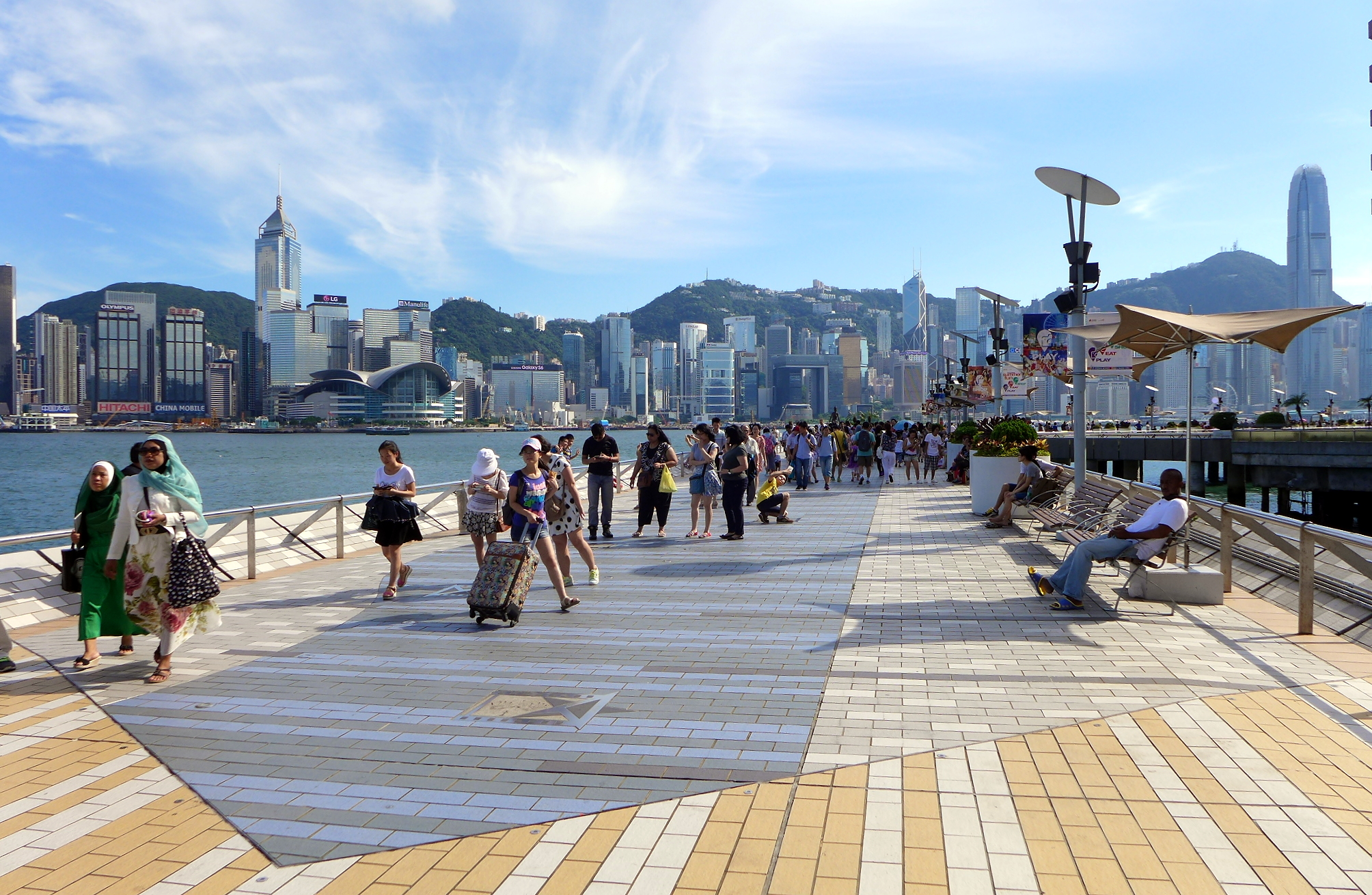
Avenue of Stars before renovation in 2015

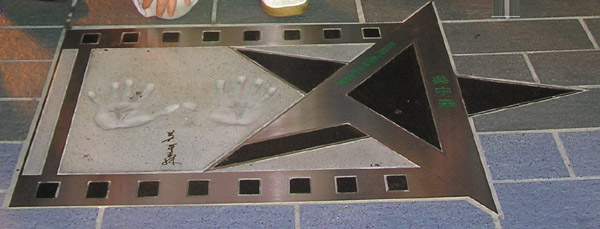
The hand prints and autograph of director John Woo

=== Establishment ===
In 1982, the New World Group built a promenade along the waterfront around the New World Centre in Tsim Sha Tsui East, Kowloon. In 2004, the Group announced it would spend HK$40 million to build the Avenue of Stars, a project supported by the Hong Kong Tourism Board, Tourism Commission, the Leisure and Cultural Services Department of the Hong Kong Government and the Hong Kong Film Awards Association.

The avenue was opened to the general public on 28 April 2004 with an opening ceremony held the previous day, 27 April 2004. The opening ceremony was presided over by a number of government and industry figures, including Henry Tang (Financial Secretary), Stephen Ip (Secretary for Economic Development and Labour), Patrick Ho (Secretary of Home Affairs), Selina Chow (Chair of Hong Kong Tourism Board), Manfred Wong (Director/Actor), and Cheng Yu-tung (Chair of New World Group); in which the privately funded avenue was handed over to the Hong Kong SAR government as public property. At opening, the avenue honoured an initial 73 inductees elected by the Hong Kong Film Awards Association and the readers of City Entertainment.

=== Redevelopment controversy ===
After having managed the avenue for 11 years, its contract is due to expire. It was announced in August 2015 that the Leisure and Cultural Services Department of the Hong Kong government would redevelop and expand the avenue jointly with the company. The Hong Kong government declared that the enhancement project would contain limited commercial appeal, and no luxury shops or high-end restaurants would be added. The walkway, very popular with tourists, is to be closed off and relocated to the Tsim Sha Tsui East Waterfront Podium Garden temporarily for three years while the expansion is undertaken.

The decision to award the contract for the redevelopment to the company without putting it out to tender, on the justification that the project was non-profit, sparked controversy locally. Residents' groups and other development companies owning properties adjacent to the walk expressed discontent, whilst the LCSD claimed that consultations with the local district council had been favourable. In an apparent attempt to de-fuse the public furore at the apparent collusion between government and big business, the government promised a public consultation.

=== Renovation ===
On 31 January 2019, the Avenue was reopened to the public after three years of renovation, redesigned by New York High Line architect James Corner Field Operations (JCFO) together with other international and local designers.

== Description ==
The Avenue of Stars is the eastern node of several tourist attractions along the Tsim Sha Tsui waterfront. In addition to the promenade and New World Centre, a number of attractions exist including the Museum of Art, Space Museum, Cultural Centre and the Clock Tower.

Entering from Salisbury Garden, a 4.5-metre-tall replica of the statuette given to winners at the Hong Kong Film Awards greets visitors. Along the 440-metre promenade, the story of Hong Kong's one hundred years of cinematic history is told through inscriptions printed on nine red pillars. Set into the promenade are plaques honouring the celebrities. Some plaques contain hand prints and autographs of the stars set in cement, but most of the plaques only contain celebrities' names as they are now deceased. A 2.5-metre bronze statue of Bruce Lee was erected along the Avenue of Stars in 2005. In 2014, a bronze statue of Anita Mui was erected along the Avenue of Stars.

The promenade commands a panoramic view across Victoria Harbour. At night, it is a popular viewing place for the Symphony of Lights display.

A large replica of the 2008 Summer Olympics torch will be on permanent display here.

== List of stars ==
The following people have received plaques on the avenue of stars.
Note: People in the list who were born before 1949 in the Republic of China are not from modern day Taiwan, but from mainland China, which the Republic of China encompassed until the end of the last civil war.

| # | Name | Place of birth | Residence | Genre | Notes | Picture |
|---|---|---|---|---|---|---|
| 1. | Lai Man-Wai (1893–1953) | Japan | Hong Kong | silent film actor; later as producer and director | married to Florence Lim – deceased | |
| 2. | Florence Lim (1905–1979) | Victoria, Canada | Hong Kong | actress | married to Lai Man-Wai – deceased | |
| 3. | Butterfly Hu (1907 or 1908–1989) | Shanghai, Republic of China | Hong Kong | actress | star from 1924 to 1960s – deceased | |
| 4. | Sir Run Run Shaw (1907–2014) | Ningbo, Imperial China | Hong Kong | Hong Kong media mogul, founder of TVB | deceased | |
| 5. | Wong Man Lei (1913–1998) | Hong Kong | Hong Kong | silent film actress, actress | started with Ji Nan Film Company and later with TVB and RTV; Chief Executive of South China Film Industry Workers Union; Lifetime Achievement Award of the Hong Kong Film Awards (1995) – deceased | |
| 6. | Zhu Shi Lin (1899–1967) | Taicang, Republic of China | Hong Kong | film director | deceased | |
| 7. | Tso Tat Wah (1915–2007) | Taishan, Guangdong, Republic of China | Hong Kong | actor | deceased | |
| 8. | Lo Duen (1911–2000) | Hong Kong | Hong Kong | actor and scriptwriter | Lifetime Achievement Award of the Hong Kong Film Critics'Association (1998) – deceased | |
| 9. | Griffin Yue Feng (1909–1999) | Shanghai, Republic of China | Hong Kong | actor and Huangmei opera star | Lifetime Achievement Award by the Film Directors' Guild (1991) – deceased | |
| 10. | Kwan Tak-hing (1905–1996) | Guangzhou, Republic of China | Singapore | actor | deceased | |
| 11. | Cheung Wood Yau (1910–1985) | Hong Kong | Hong Kong | Cantonese opera star | opera star 1940 and 1950s; later joined TVB and retired 1982 – deceased | |
| 12. | Ng Cho Fan (1910–1993) | Hong Kong | Canada | actor | Greatest Individual Achievement Award given by the Cultural Ministry of the People's Republic of China | |
| 13. | Tang Wing Cheung (1916–1997) | Shunde, Guangdong, Republic of China | Hong Kong | Cantonese opera star | Opera King of Charity – deceased | |
| 14. | Pak Yin (1920–1987) | Guangzhou, China | Hong Kong | actress | retired 1964 – deceased | |
| 15. | Zhou Xuan (1920–1957) | Changzhou, Republic of China | Hong Kong | singer and film actress | deceased | |
| 16. | Cheung Ying (1919–1984) | Fujian, Republic of China | Hong Kong | actor | died in Canada 1984 | |
| 17. | Lee Tit (1913–1996) | Hong Kong | Hong Kong | actor | star 1930s and 1940s; Lifetime Achievement Award by the Film Directors'Guild (1995) | |
| 18. | Wu Pang (1909–2000) | Shanghai, Republic of China | Hong Kong | director | directed 58 Wong Fei Hung films – deceased | |
| 19. | Yam Kim-fai (1912–1989) | Nanhai, Republic of China | Hong Kong | opera star | deceased | |
| 20. | Shek Kin (1913–2009) | Panyu, Guangdong, Republic of China | Hong Kong | film and TV actor | deceased | |
| 21. | Li Li-hua (1924–2017) | Heibei, Republic of China | Hong Kong and United States | actress | deceased | |
| 22. | Bai Guang (1921–1999) | Beijing, Republic of China | Kuala Lumpur, Malaysia | singer and actress | deceased | |
| 23. | Ng Wui (1913–1996) | Guangzhou, Republic of China | Hong Kong | director and actor | actor and co-founder of Union Film Enterprise Ltd; starred in over 100 films and directed over 200 films; later with RTV – deceased | |
| 24. | Pak Suet Sin | Guangzhou, Republic of China | Hong Kong | Chinese opera star | The Founder of Cantonese opera star Yam Kim Fai | |
| 25. | Hung Sin Nui (1924–2013) | Guangzhou, Republic of China | Hong Kong and China | singer and actress | deceased | |
| 26. | Chun Kim (1926–1969) | Hong Kong | Hong Kong | writer and director | founded Kong Ngee Co | |
| 27. | Yu So-chow (1930–2017) | Beijing, Republic of China | Hong Kong and San Francisco, United States | Chinese opera | deceased | |
| 28. | Leung Sing Poh (1908–1981) | Hong Kong | Hong Kong | Cantonese opera star | later with TVB; award MBE 1976 | |
| 29. | Tang Kei Chen (1912–1991) | Taiwan | Hong Kong | radio anchor and radio actor/comedian; moved to Canada 1975 | deceased | |
| 30. | Tang Pik-wan (1924–1991) | Sanshui, Guangdong, Republic of China | Hong Kong | Cantonese opera star/actress | deceased | |
| 31. | Fong Yim Fun | Hong Kong | Hong Kong | Chinese opera | | |
| 32. | Miranda Yang (1933–2016) | Shanghai, Republic of China | Hong Kong | actress and producer | deceased | |
| 33. | Linda Ching (Lin Dai) (1934–1964) | Guilin, Guangxi, Republic of China | Hong Kong | actress | took her own life in 1964 – deceased | |
| 34. | Woo Fung | Guangzhou, Republic of China | Hong Kong | actor, director | | |
| 35. | Ms Lucilla Yu Ming (1932–1996) | Hong Kong | Hong Kong | Cantonese opera star and actress | retired 1964 | |
| 36. | Patrick Tse Yin (1936-2026) | Guangdong, Republic of China | Hong Kong and Vancouver, Canada | Hong Kong film and TV actor, screenwriter, producer | deceased | |
| 37. | Li Han-hsiang (1926–1996) | Jinxi, Liaoning, Republic of China | Hong Kong | director | died of a heart attack in 1996 | |
| 38. | Loke Wan Tho (1915–1964) | Kuala Lumpur, Malaysia | Taiwan | cinema owner | deceased | |
| 39. | Roy Chiao (1927–1999) | Shanghai, Republic of China | Seattle, United States | actor | interpreter for the US Army during the Korean War – deceased | |
| 40. | Patricia Lam Fung (1941–1976) | Hong Kong | Hong Kong | actress | retired 1967 and died 1976 | |
| 41. | Chang Cheh (1923–2002) | Shanghai, Republic of China | Hong Kong | film director | deceased | |
| 42. | Chor Yuen (1934–2022) | Guangzhou, Republic of China | Hong Kong | actor | deceased | |
| 43. | King Hu (1932–1997) | Beijing, Republic of China | Taiwan and Hong Kong | director | deceased | |
| 44. | Ivy Ling Po | Shantou, Republic of China | Hong Kong | opera star | | |
| 45. | Connie Chan | Guangzhou, Republic of China | Hong Kong | actress and singer | | |
| 46. | Josephine Siao Fong Fong | Suzhou, Jiangsu Republic of China | Hong Kong | actress | | |
| 47. | Fung Bo Bo | Sandakan, North Borneo | Hong Kong | film and TV actress | | |
| 48. | Jimmy Wang Yu (1943–2022) | Wuxi, Jiangsu, Republic of China | Hong Kong | actor, producer, director, and screenwriter | deceased | |
| 49. | Tommy Ti Lung | Xinhu, Republic of China | Hong Kong | actor | | |
| 50. | David Chiang | Hong Kong | Hong Kong and Vancouver, Canada | actor | | |
| 51. | Leonard Ho Kwong Cheong (1925–1998) | Hong Kong | Hong Kong | publicity officer and production officer at Shaw Brothers | later vice-chairman at Golden Harvest – deceased | |
| 52. | Raymond Chow (1927–2018) | Hong Kong | Hong Kong | film director | deceased | |
| 53. | Bruce Lee (1940–1973) | San Francisco, United States | Hong Kong | martial artist, actor | Founder of Jeet Kune Do, voted Greatest Martial Artist of All Time – deceased | |
| 54. | Ng See-yuen | Hong Kong | Hong Kong | director | | |
| 55. | Michael Hui | Panyu, Guangzhou, Republic of China | Hong Kong | comedian, director and screenwriter | | |
| 56. | Sam Hui | Hong Kong | Hong Kong | actor and Hong Kong pop singer | | |
| 57. | Brigitte Lin Ching Hsia | Taipei, Taiwan | | actress | | |
| 58. | Sammo Hung Kam Po | Hong Kong | Hong Kong | Hong Kong actor | | |
| 59. | Jackie Chan | Hong Kong | Hong Kong | Hong Kong film actor | | |
| 60. | John Woo | Guangzhou, Republic of China | Hong Kong | film director | | |
| 61. | Yuen Woo-ping | Guangzhou, Republic of China | Hong Kong | director and martial arts choreographer | | |
| 62. | Ann Hui on Wah | Anshan, Liaoning, Republic of China | Hong Kong | director | | |
| 63. | Tsui Hark | Saigon, South Vietnam | Hong Kong | director | | |
| 64. | Chow Yun-fat | Hong Kong | Hong Kong | TV and film actor | | |
| 65. | Leslie Cheung (1956–2003) | Hong Kong | Hong Kong, Vancouver, Canada | Cantopop singer and film actor | deceased | |
| 66. | Andy Lau | Hong Kong | Hong Kong | Cantopop singer and film actor | | |
| 67. | Jet Li | Beijing, China | Hong Kong and Singapore | film actor | | |
| 68. | Maggie Cheung | Hong Kong | Hong Kong and United Kingdom | TV and film actress | | |
| 69. | Anita Mui (1963–2003) | Hong Kong | Hong Kong and Vancouver, Canada | Cantopop singer and film actress | deceased | |
| 70. | Tony Leung Chiu-wai | Hong Kong | Hong Kong | TV and film actor | | |
| 71. | Michelle Yeoh Choo Kheng | Ipoh, Perak, Malaysia | Hong Kong | film actress | | |
| 72. | Wong Kar-wai | Shanghai, China | Hong Kong | director | | |
| 73. | Stephen Chow | Hong Kong | Hong Kong | director and film actor | | |
| 74. | Ms Tsi Lo Lin (1924–2015) | Hong Kong | Hong Kong | actress | deceased. | |
| 75. | Mr Lam Kar Sing (1933–2015) | Hong Kong | Hong Kong | Chinese opera actor | deceased | |
| 76. | Wong Tin-lam (1927–2010) | Shanghai, Republic of China | Hong Kong | scriptwriter, producer, director, and actor | deceased | |
| 77. | Mr Bow Fong (1922–2006) | Hong Kong | Hong Kong | actor | | |
| 78. | Lau Kar-leung (1934–2013) | Guangzhou, Republic of China | Hong Kong | film and TV actor | deceased | |
| 79. | Shek Wai | Jiangzu, Republic of China | Hong Kong | movie actress | wife of actor Fu Chi | |
| 80. | Fu Chi | Liaoning, Republic of China | Hong Kong | actor and director | husband of Shek Wai | |
| 81. | Grace Chang (1933-2026) | Shanghai, Republic of China | Hong Kong | actress and singer | deceased | |
| 82. | Patsy Kar (1935–2022) | Hong Kong | Bangkok, Thailand | actress | deceased | |
| 83. | Kwan Shan (1933–2012) | Shenyang, Liaoning, Republic of China | Hong Kong | actor | deceased | |
| 84. | Lo Wai (1918–1996) | Jiangsu, Republic of China | Hong Kong | actor | deceased | |
| 85. | Tong Kai (1937-2025) | Macau | Hong Kong | martial arts coordinator for Chinese Opera and movie choreographer | deceased | |
| 86. | Nee Kwong (1935–2022) | Ningbo, Zhejiang, Republic of China | Hong Kong | novelist and screenwriter | | |
| 87. | James Wong (1941–2004) | Panyu, Guangzhou, Republic of China | Hong Kong | lyricist and writer | deceased | |
| 88. | Karl Maka | Taishan, Guangzhou, Republic of China | Hong Kong | producer, director, actor, and presenter | | |
| 89. | Eric Tsang | Hong Kong | Hong Kong | film and TV actor, TVB MC | | |
| 90. | William Chang Suk Ping | Hong Kong | Hong Kong | film editor, production designer, and art director | | |
| 91. | Tony Leung Ka-fai | Hong Kong | Hong Kong | film actor | | |
| 92. | Anthony Wong Chau Sang | Hong Kong | Hong Kong | TV and film actor | | |
| 93. | Cecilia Cheung | Hong Kong | Hong Kong | film actress | | |
| 94. | Lai Pak-hoi (1889–1950) | Xinhui, Guangdong, Imperial China | Hong Kong | actor and producer | deceased | |
| 95. | Kenneth Tsang (1935–2022) | Shanghai, Republic of China | Hong Kong | TV and film actor | | |
| 96. | Sylvia Chang | Chiayi, Taiwan | Taiwan | film actress | | |
| 97. | Jacky Cheung | Hong Kong | Hong Kong | Cantopop singer and film actor | | |
| 98. | Lau Ching Wan | Hong Kong | Hong Kong | TV and film actor | | |
| 99. | Aaron Kwok | Hong Kong | Hong Kong | TV and film actor, Cantopop singer | | |
| 100. | Gong Li | Shenyang, Liaoning, China | China and Singapore | film actress | | |
| 101. | Leon Lai | Beijing, China | Hong Kong | TV and film actor, Cantopop singer | | |
| 102. | Deanie Ip Tak-han | Dapengcheng, Guangdong, Republic of China | Hong Kong | singer and film actress | | |
| 103. | Simon Yam Tat-wah | Hong Kong | Hong Kong | actor and film producer | | |
| 104. | Kara Hui Ying-Hung | Shandong, China | Hong Kong | film actress | | |
| 105. | Carina Lau Kar-ling | Suzhou, Jiangsu, China | Hong Kong | TV and film actress | | |
| 106. | Louis Koo Tin-lok | Hong Kong | Hong Kong | TV and film actor | | |
| 107. | Nicholas Tse Ting-fung | Hong Kong | Hong Kong, Vancouver, Canada | Singer and actor | son of actor Patrick Tse | |
| 108. | McDull | Hong Kong | Hong Kong | Cartoon character | created by Brian Tse and Alice Mak | |
| 109. | Cecilia Yip | Hong Kong | Hong Kong, China, Taiwan | Actress | | |
| 110. | Dodo Cheng Yu Ling | Hong Kong | Hong Kong | Actress, TV Host | | |
| 111. | Anita Yuen Wing Yi | Hong Kong, Chonghou | Hong Kong | Actress & Singer | | |
| 112. | Sandra Ng | British Hong Kong | Hong Kong, London | Actress, Film Director and Producer | | |
| 113. | Helena Law Lan | Hong Kong, Canada | Hong Kong, British | Actress | Dedicated to the World War II soldier who died at age 34 | |
| 114. | Nina Paw | Hong Kong | Hong Kong, Shangchou | Actress, show host | Who was married to Henry Fong | |
| 115. | Miriam Yeung Chin Wah | Hong Kong, Sai Ying Pun | Hong Kong, Tsan Yuk | Actress & Singer | | |
| 116. | Teresa Mo | Hong Kong, British | Hong Kong | Actress | | |

== See also ==
- Statue of McDull
- Tsim Sha Tsui Waterfront Revitalisation Plan
- Eastwood City Walk of Fame, Quezon City
- Avenue of Stars, London
- Hollywood Walk of Fame, Los Angeles
- Canada's Walk of Fame, Toronto
- Paseo de las Luminarias, Mexico City
- Hong Kong Avenue of Comic Stars
