= Tsim Sha Tsui Waterfront Revitalisation Plan =

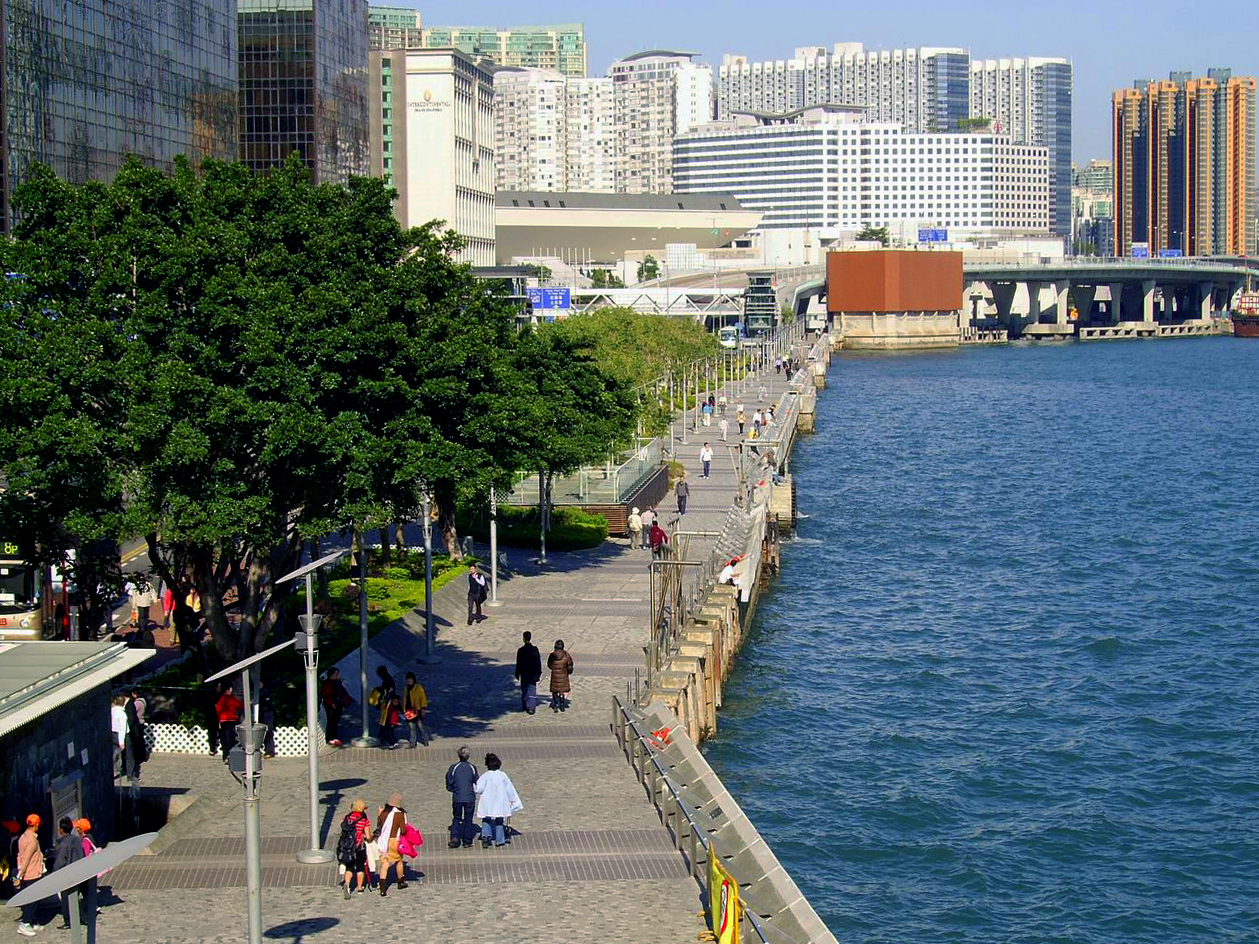
Tsim Sha Tsui's waterfront promenade

The Tsim Sha Tsui Waterfront Revitalisation Plan (Chinese: 優化尖沙咀海濱計劃) is a forfeited development proposal by New World Development Co. Ltd and the Leisure and Cultural Services Department made in 2013. The aim of the plan was to reshape the waterfront by adding in activity hubs consisting of various small-scale commercial, entertainment and recreational areas in Salisbury Garden (梳士巴利花園), Avenue of Stars as well as the East Tsim Sha Tsui Promenade (尖沙咀海濱花園). The plan was later dismissed by Leisure and Cultural Services Department and the Harbourfront Commission due to huge public controversies in 2016.

== Details ==
According to the preliminary proposal submitted by New World Development, three major areas totaling 38,000 squaremeter of public space is highlighted for enhancement in the plan:

Salisbury Garden was planned to act as an art and cultural gateway. The Garden was proposed for two major uses, including developing an open space as a vibrant venue for visual arts, music, performances and other outdoor cultural and leisure programmes. The revitalised area would be acting as an interconnected gateway serving as prime initial destination and civic gathering place and thoroughfare for the entire Tsim Sha Tsui Waterfront area.

The Avenue of Stars and East Tsim Sha Tsui Promenade would be developed as an "Icon Celebrating Hong Kong's History and Movie Glamour". By extending the Avenue of Stars towards the east, the area encompasses the Tsim Sha Tsui Promenade. Three main hubs were proposed including: 1) establishing a two-storeyed food and beverage amenity to facilitate visitors' experience in waterfront, 2) creating a display venue to showcase the history of Hong Kong movie industry development, as well as 3) transforming the Hung Hom Bypass flyover into an area which allows cultural and talent performance with an observation deck for tourists' sightseeing.

== Timeline ==
Year	Month	Event
2003	May 23	New World Development signed an agreement with the Leisure and Cultural Services Department to finance the project Avenue of Stars. New World Development has been responsible for its management for 20 years.
2003	June	The Leisure and Cultural Services Department set up a Management Committee to oversee the management and performance of Avenue of Stars.
2011	Aug	CNN's website CNNgo listed the Avenue of Stars as one of the "World's 12 Worst Tourist Traps" because it focused only on the provision of souvenir booths and lacked comfortable resting areas. Thus, the Tourism Commission and the LCSD contacted the Hong Kong Tourism Board and the AoS Management Company Limited to explore appropriate improvement measures including the provision of additional resting facilities in the vicinity of the AoS.
2012	Oct 25	Yau Tsim Mong District Council requested New World Development to develop a revitalization proposal of Tsim Sha Tsui waterfront to meet the growing number of tourists in the future.
2013	Jan 10	New World Development submitted a preliminary proposal to the Leisure and Cultural Services Department.
2014	Oct	New World Development developed a revitalisation plan for Tsim Sha Tsui Waterfront.
2015	Jan	The revised design proposal was presented to the Task Force on the Harbourfront Commission in Kowloon, Tsuen Wan and Kwai Tsing.8
2015	July	A non-public consultation was conducted by the Town Planning Board.
2015	Aug	1. Green Sense (環保觸覺) and Professional Commons (公共專業聯盟) requested the abandonment of the Plan in a press conference; 2. TPB approved the Plan.; 3. Action Group on Protection of the Harbour member Ching Wing Fai, Cheung Chau resident Kwok Cheuk-kin and People Power lawmakers planned to apply judicial review against the Plan.
2015	Sep	1. The government announced plans to consult the public over the Plan and stated that the proposed contract with New World Development would not be signed this year.; 2. Commissioned the Public Engagement Exercise of the Plan Phase 1 till November 2015.
2015	Nov 20	The Kowloon Shangri-La and Murdoch Investments Inc. filed a judicial review against the Plan.
2016	Jan	Government commissioned the Public Engagement Exercise of the Plan Phase 2 until November.
2016	Feb	The Leisure and Cultural Services Department decided to revise the Plan by adopting a simple design for the Promenade and maintain the area as a passive public open space. NWD decided not to pursue the plans and would not assume management of the now simplified extension.

== Partnership Approach ==
The Leisure and Cultural Services Department adopted the Partnership Approach (夥伴合作計畫) to entrust the Tsim Sha Tsui Waterfront Revitalisation Plan to the New World Development Company Limited.

Under the Partnership Approach, New World Development would fully fund and carry out the revitalisation works. The daily management of Tsim Sha Tsui Waterfront would be taken up by a non-profit-making organisation under New World Development. Leisure and Cultural Services Department would set up a management committee to oversee the operation and performance of the organisation. An advisory committee would also be formed by inviting experts, district and community personalities to advise on the management issues and enhance public participation.

The revenue generated from the operation would be used for the management and maintenance of the Waterfront facilities. At the expiry of contract, the non-profit-making organisation would be required to return full amount of surplus, if any, to the Government. In case of a deficit, it would be borne by the organisation.

== Stakeholders ==
- Action Group on Protection of the Harbour
- Harbourfront Commission
- Home Affairs Bureau
- Leisure and Cultural Services Department
- New World Development Company Limited
- Planning Department
- Town Planning Board
- Victoria Waterfront Concern Group
- Yau Tsim Mong District Council

== Consultation and public engagement ==
The Town Planning Board conducted a non-public consultation in July 2015. Concerned parties, such as hotel operators, owners of commercial buildings along the waterfront, and residents nearby, were invited to express opinions on the Plan. 340 submissions were received, of which nine supported and 328 opposed the Plan.

The Leisure and Cultural Services Department, together with New World Development, further launched a series of public engagement exercises in two phases, with a view to deepening public understanding to the detailed design and future operational arrangements of the plan. New World Development also set up a website on 10 October through which the public can give opinions on the updated design of the Plan.

The phase one engagement was held from September to November 2015. Roving exhibitions on the updated design were staged in places including Tsim Sha Tsui waterfront, Hong Kong Cultural Centre and other the Leisure and Cultural Services Department venues from 26 October to 6 November 2015. The exhibition included a video, a 3D model, a questionnaire on iPad. In addition, six focus group meetings were held from 30 September to 22 October 2015 to gauge opinions from key stakeholders.

Scheduled from January to June 2016, the phase two engagement was designed to focus on the future operational arrangements of the revitalised promenade. The Leisure and Cultural Services Department proposed to set up an Advisory Committee, composed of experts, district personalities and representatives of the art, film and tourism industries, to serve as a platform to steer the implementation of the plan. However, the phase two engagement did not proceed as because of the announcement to call off the project.

== Controversies ==
Legitimacy of consultation

During the non-public consultation in July 2015, the Town Planning Board received opinions concerning decrease in pedestrian flow during the construction period, disturbance to neighbourhoods, the privatization of public space, etc. However, despite the widespread opposition, the Planning Department decided in the meeting that they did not oppose the Plan. Civil Renaissance criticised that the district council ignored the public opinions and reluctant to hold public consultation.

As the later public engagement exercises were co-hosted by the New World Development, the Victoria Waterfront Concern Group argued that the government, for its first time, allowed property developer to exercise government power. Alfred Lai, member of the concern group, said it was ridiculous to ask the public to express their opinions to a business corporation who had not signed any contracts with the government. In addition, he also criticized the public engagement exercise was not a genuine consultation as public tender was not an option in the agenda. “The engagement only aimed at discussing the operational arrangement of the decision previously made by the government. Work first, then consultation,” he noted.

Diffused role of Harbourfront Commission

Inconsistency stances between the government and the advisory body had been alleged by public. Chairman Nicholas Brooke said the revitalization plan should be contracted out through a competitive process. Member Paul Zimmerman said the decision to award the company with potential conflict of interests “did not look good to the public.”

In addition, Harbourfront Commission told the media that they had not been consulted properly in the process. ‘“Only the general idea of revitalization had been presented in the previous meeting.” said Vincent Ng, member of Harbourfront Commission. New World Development said that they did not submit the proposal to Harbourfront Commission because there was no scheduled meeting in July and August. On the other hand, Stanley Wong, the vice chairmen of Town Planning Board, suggested that it is not necessary to inform and consult Harbourfront Commission whose opinions have no legal binding power and may serve as reference only.

Violation of Introductory Guide to Public Private Partnerships

Member of Harbourfront Commission Paul Zimmerman criticised that the government adopted the title of “partnership approach” and “non-profit-making project” to justify its violation of the Introductory Guide to Public Private Partnerships and absence of public open tender.

The title of “partnership approach” was not adopted in the preliminary proposal. Despite the government saying that there were similar projects under such approach, it was never mentioned in any government document. The group criticised that it was just a shame and came from out of nothing.

Indirect commercial benefits for New World Development

Although New World Development promised the waterfront would be run by non-profit-making organisation, the Victoria Waterfront Concern Group questioned that the Plan could provide New World Development an unfair indirect commercial benefits. New World Development owned three commercial projects nearby, including New World Millennium Hong Kong Hotel and New World Centre. The new exit of Avenue of Stars, shopping facilities and restaurants would bring more customers for shopping malls and more guests for the hotels owned by New World Development.

Member of the concern group, Tanya Chan Suk-chong, commented that considered the total area of new site reached 400,000 sq ft of which 80 percent is government land, the Plan was to utilise public space to generate indirect commercial profits for New World Development . Private companies cooperate with government for financial interests. There cannot be a “not-profit-making” project.

Possible collusion between the government and business sector

The Secretary for Home Affairs Lau Kong-wah commented that it was reasonable for New World Development to lead the plan as it had already been managing the AoS. Michelle Li Mei-Sheung, director of the Leisure and Cultural Services Department said that the New World Development was granted the franchise because it had a proven track record and experience in running the Avenue of Stars and making it a world class attraction.

Considered that the total area of new site reached 400,000 sq ft and was five times larger than the AoS, and the fact that AoS was once named one of the world’s 12 worst “tourist traps”, public criticised that these reasons provided by the government were invalid to support its decision to entrust the plan directly to the New World Development instead of opting for an open tender. Legislative Councilor Claudia Mo said the government’s decision to give the project to New World Development raised suspicions of collusion. Two committee members of TPB’s Metro Planning Committee, Clarence Leung and Wilton Fok, have raised concerns about allegations of the government colluding with New World Development, which currently manages the Avenue of Stars attraction on the promenade. As the chairman of New World Development, Henry Cheng Kaw-Shun, is considered as a supporter of the Chief Executive Leung Chun-Ying. People questioned that the entrustment might involve possible collusion between government and business sector, being a tactic of Leung to prepare for his succession.
