= Tsim Sha Tsui East Waterfront Podium Garden =

Public garden in Kowloon, Hong Kong

- Interactive map of Tsim Sha Tsui East Waterfront Podium Garden
- Type: Tsim Sha Tsui East, Kowloon, Hong Kong
- Coordinates: 22.2965°N 114.1759°E
- Open: 2007; 19 years ago

Tsim Sha Tsui East Waterfront Podium Garden
- Traditional Chinese: 尖沙咀東海濱平台花園
- Simplified Chinese: 尖沙咀东海滨平台花园
Transcriptions
Standard Mandarin
- Hanyu Pinyin: Jiānshāzuǐ Dōng Hǎibīn Píngtái Huāyuán
Yue: Cantonese
- Jyutping: zim1 saa1 zeoi2 dung1 hoi2 ban1 ping4 toi4 faa1 jyun4*2

The Tsim Sha Tsui East Waterfront Podium Garden is a public garden located in southern Tsim Sha Tsui East, Kowloon, Hong Kong. It was constructed by the Tourism Commission of Hong Kong in 2007, and has been operating under Leisure and Cultural Services Department as a public space ever since. The site currently hosts the Avenue of Stars under the name "Garden of Stars" as part of an ongoing waterfront revitalisation project.

== History ==
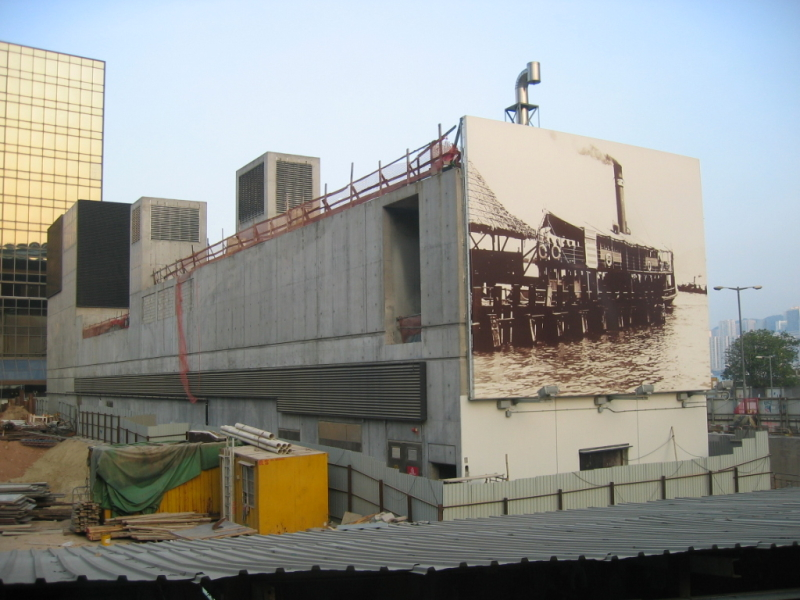
Construction site of Tsim Sha Tsui East Waterfront Podium Garden, 2004

The garden's Originally named Wing On Plaza Garden (永安廣場公園), named after a nearby commercial plaza, The name was changed to its current name in a gazette published on 2007.

In 2004, the government relocated the bus terminal of the nearby Star Ferry Public Transport Interchange to this area. The Tsim Sha Tsui Spur Line of the Hong Kong MTR, which was supposed to pass through the region, was redesigned into an elevated railway. Tsim Sha Tsui East Waterfront Podium Garden was constructed as a part of the redesigned transportation hub, and it was connected to Middle Road Children's Playground, which was also relocated above the East Tsim Sha Tsui station.

== Overview ==
The garden was constructed in a Modernist architectural style, with water pool, small theater, dining area and pavilion, as well as two elevators connected to the ground floor.

Due to its proximity to the shore, visitors are able to see many places along the Victoria Harbour from here, including the Hong Kong Central Library, Island Eastern Corridor, Lei Yue Mun, Kwun Tong District and the Kowloon Bay. During holiday seasons, many tourists also come here to see the fireworks of Victoria Harbour.

== Garden of Stars ==
In July 2015, Leisure and Cultural Services Department and New World Development cosponsored a plan to renovate Salisbury Garden, Avenue of Stars and Tsim Sha Tsui Promenade.

On November 15, 2015, four bronze statues and some of the hand prints of celebrities were temporarily moved from Avenue of Stars to the Garden of Stars constructed here. Inside the garden, a 63-metre long painting strip was also set up, which featured scenes and characters from several famous Hong Kong movies. Out of all the original 107 hand prints, only 20 were placed in a recreated frame in time, while the others were only presented in 2016.

Since the renovation of the Avenue of Stars were completed, the hand prints and statues were returned from the Garden of Stars.

== Transportation ==
=== MTR ===
- Tuen Ma line Tsuen Wan line: East Tsim Sha Tsui station, Tsim Sha Tsui station (Exit P1)

=== Bus ===
- Tsim Sha Tsui East (Mody Road) Bus Terminus
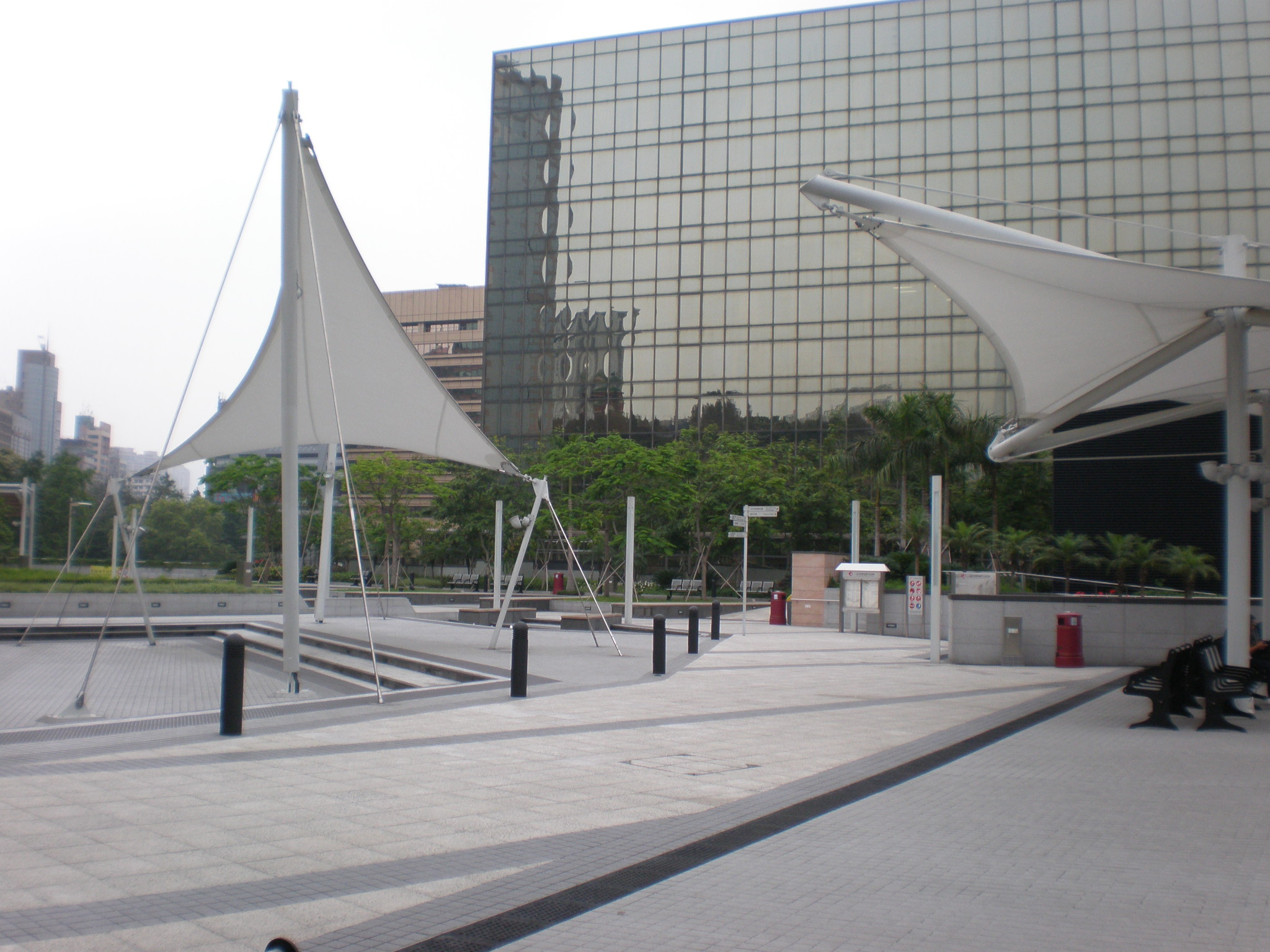
Part of the Tsim Sha Tsui East Waterfront Podium Garden in 2008
