= Statue of Anita Mui =

Statue in Hong Kong

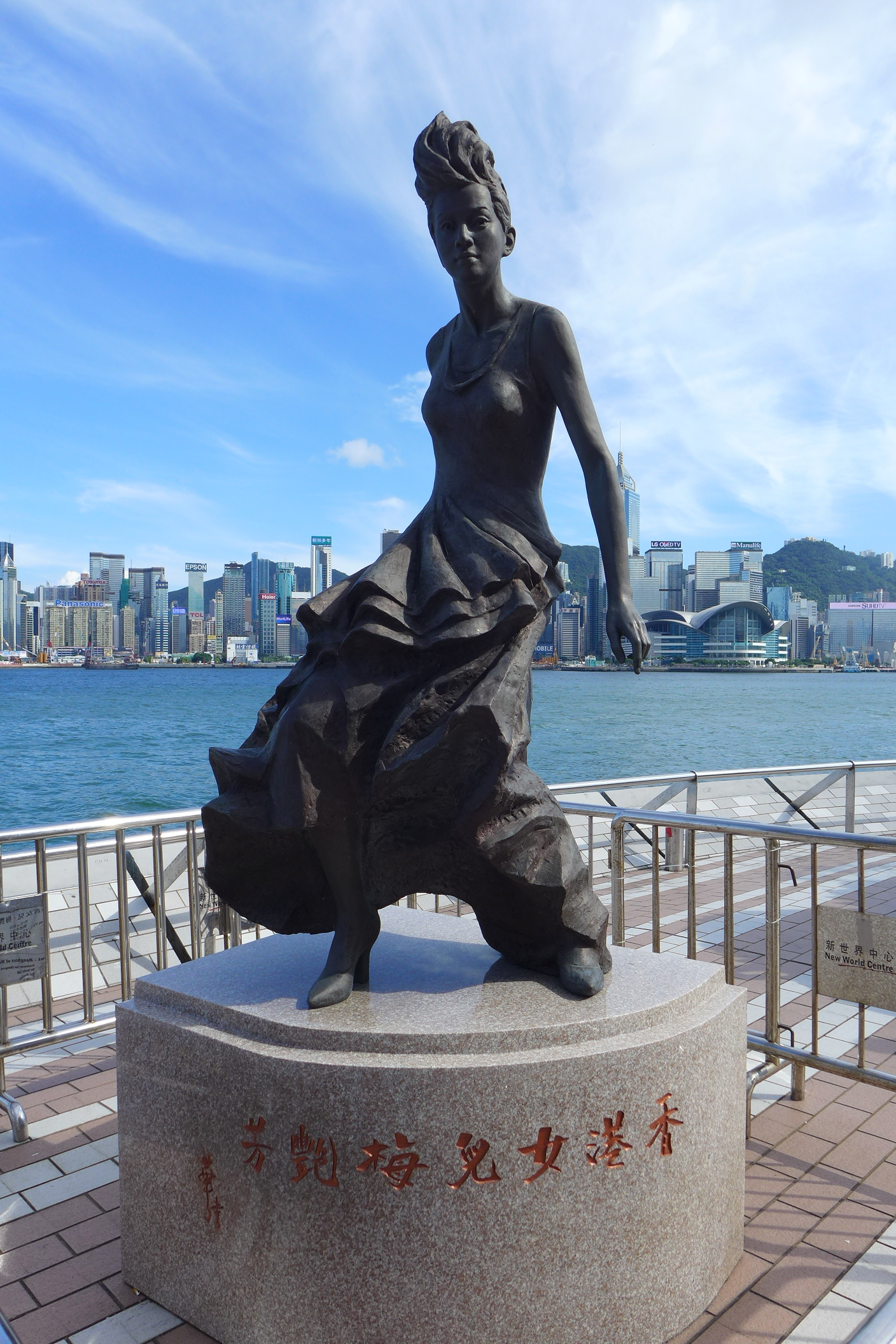
- The statue in 2015
- Subject: Anita Mui
- Location: Hong Kong

A statue of musician Anita Mui was installed on Hong Kong's Avenue of Stars, along Tsim Sha Tsui's waterfront in Kowloon, in 2014. The statue has been relocated to the Tsim Sha Tsui East Waterfront Podium Garden temporarily, during an ongoing waterfront revitalisation project.
