= Hong Kong Film Awards statue =

Sculpture in Hong Kong

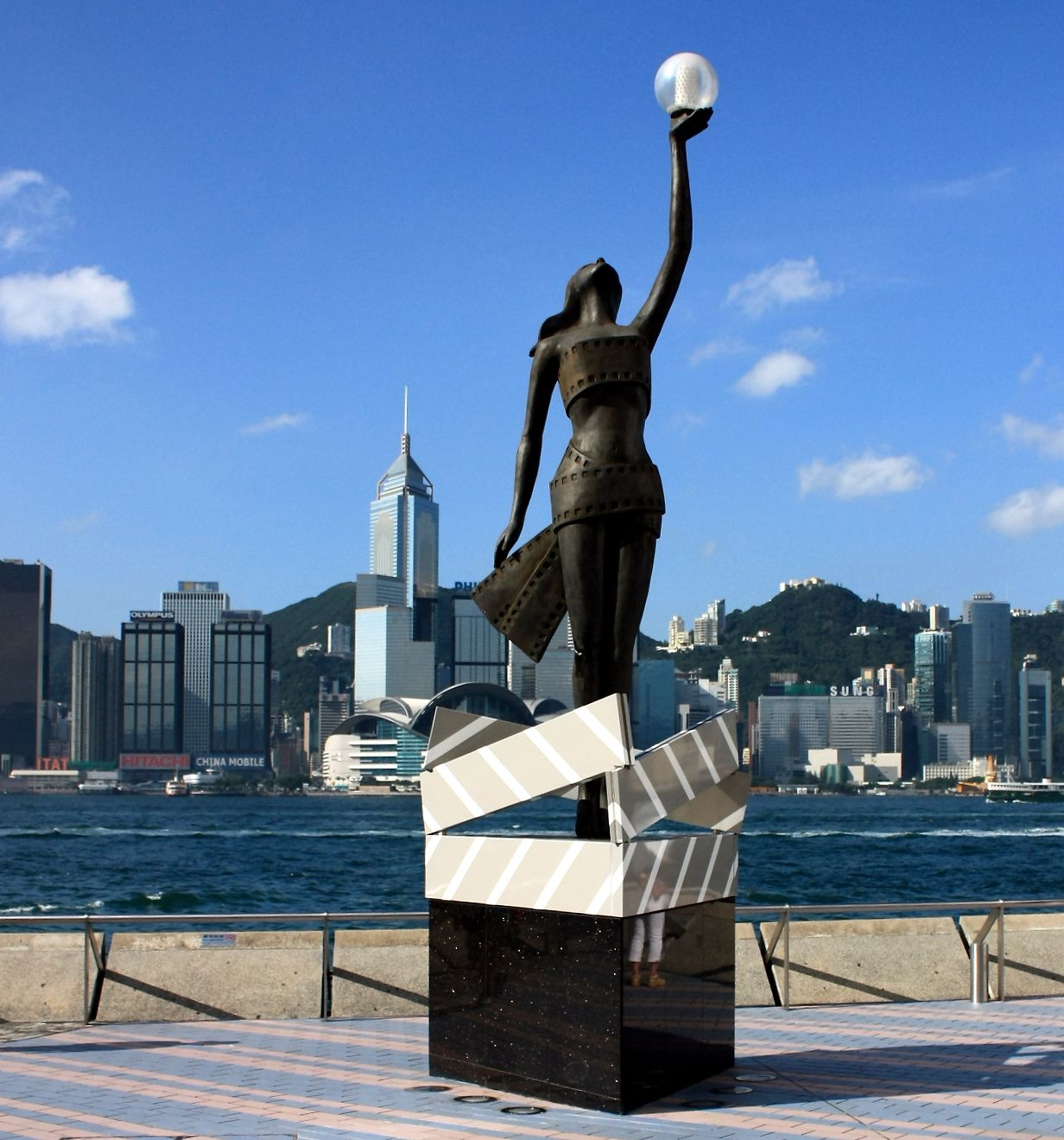
- The statue in 2009
- Location: Hong Kong

The Hong Kong Film Awards statue is a 6-metre (20 ft) bronze sculpture depicting the Hong Kong Film Award statuette presented to recipients, installed along Hong Kong's Avenue of Stars, in Tsim Sha Tsui's waterfront in Kowloon. The statue has been relocated to the Tsim Sha Tsui East Waterfront Podium Garden temporarily, during an ongoing waterfront revitalisation project.
