= New Town Central Park =

Park in Shanghai, China

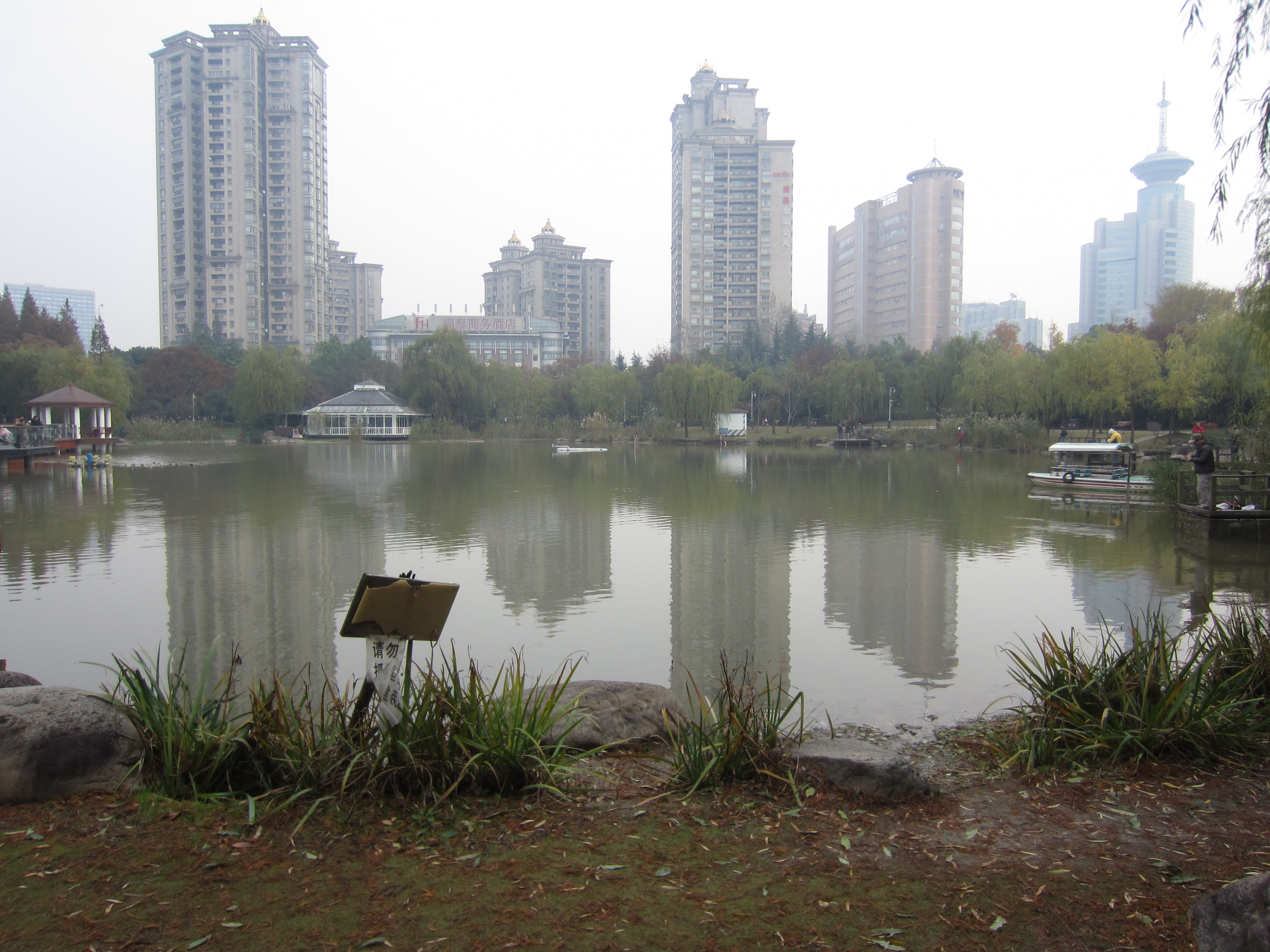
- The park in 2015
- Interactive map of New Town Central Park
- Type: Park
- Location: Changning District
- Nearest city: Shanghai
- Coordinates: 31.2026°N 121.4002°E
- Area: 130,000 square meters
- Created: 2000

New Town Central Park, or Hongqiao New Town Central Park, is a 130,000-square-meter park located at 2238 Yan'an Xi Lu (延安西路2238号) in the Changning District's Hongqiao Development Zone, in Shanghai, China.

== Description and history ==
The park opened in 2000 in pursuit of "the harmony between human beings and nature" and features 115 plants species and a 52,000-square-meter grassland. The park borders the Shanghai Oil Painting and Sculpture Institute and Liu Haisu Art Gallery. According to City Weekend, the park is popular among "local white-collar professionals who work and live in nearby Gubei and its surrounding areas". The China Internet Information Center called the park "an ideal place for nearby Shanghainese to escape from a day's hard work and return to the happiness of nature".

=== Public art ===
The park features a bust of Mahatma Gandhi (due to Australian sculptor Drago Marin Cherina), a statue of Charlie Chaplin, and a statue of Ma Zhanshan.
