= 1987 Shanghai stampede =

Human crush in Shanghai, China

- Date: 10 December 1987
- Location: Shanghai, China
- Type: human stampede
- Deaths: 17
- Injuries: 72+

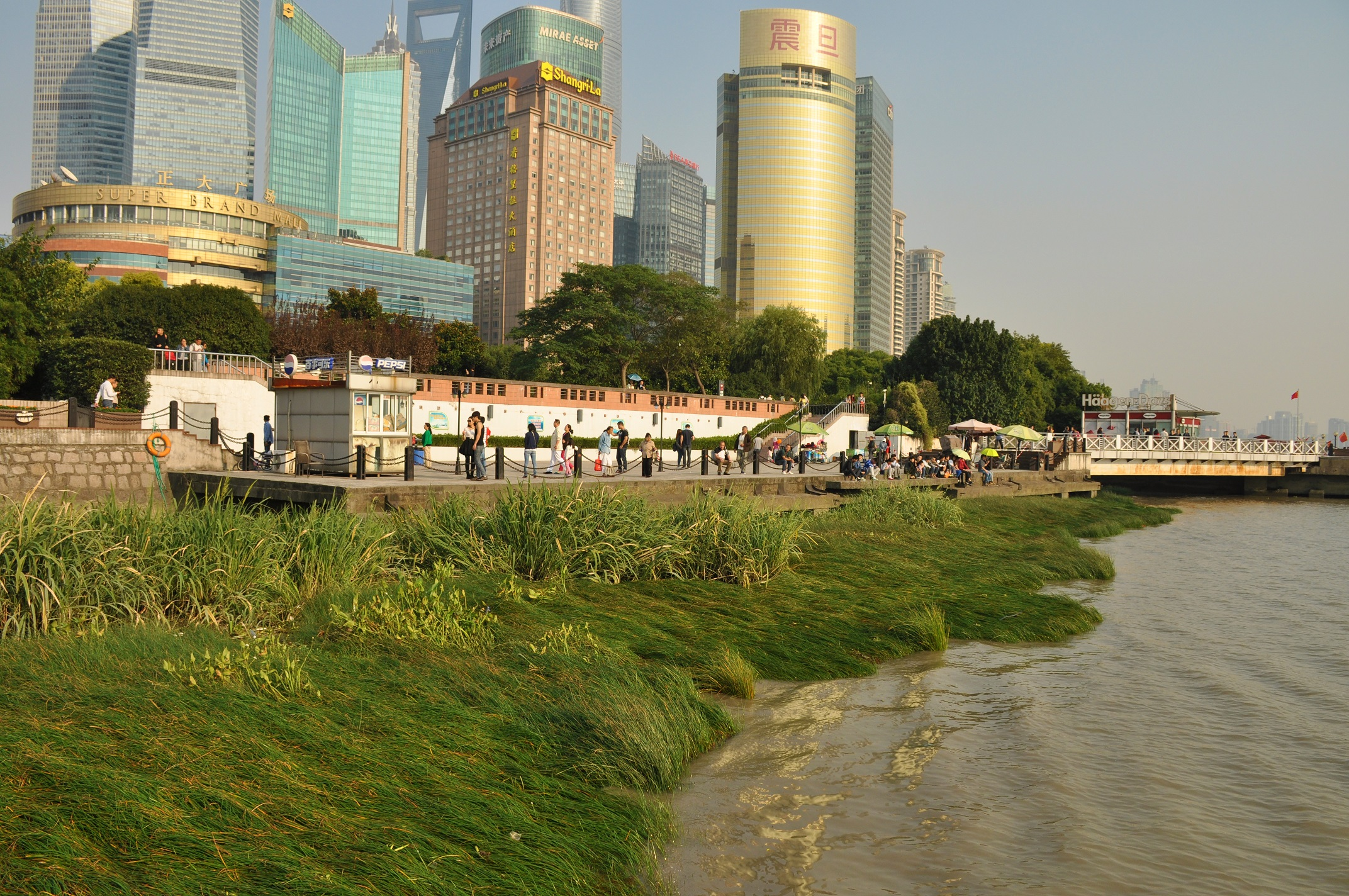
The former site of Lujiazui ferry wharf

On December 10, 1987, a stampede occurred at the Lujiazui ferry terminal in Shanghai, China. The main cause for the stampede was a severe fog that continued for hours and limited visibility to only 30 meters. This caused the ferry service to be suspended, leading to a crowd which was anxious to leave; as soon as the ferry service was restored, the crowd hurried to board the ferry, causing a stampede. The accident led to 17 deaths, 2 seriously injured and over 70 slightly injured.

== The accident ==
There were no bridges or tunnels available to cross the Huangpu River in 1987, and daily commute relied highly on Route 21, which was developed by the Shanghai Ferry Company. Lujiazui was heavily crowded, and Route 21 was the company's busiest route. Early in the morning, the river was covered by a fog with a visibility of less than 30 metres, according to Shanghai Central Meteorological Observatory. In accordance with the relevant regulations, all the ships should cease cross-river operations when the visibility falls under 100 metres. By 9:00 AM, the fog began to scatter and the ferry was to commence operation. An estimated 30,000-40,000 passengers (many with bicycles) had queued for the ferry. The passengers became anxious from the waiting and began to push towards the second ferry, after the first had departed. People and bicycles began to fall into the river from the pushing and the scene quickly turned chaotic. The station was closed five minutes later in order to disperse the crowd and commence rescue operations.

The disaster killed 17 people, severely injured 2 and injured over 70 people. It would be the deadliest stampede to occur in Shanghai until the stampede in 2014. Another casualty report stated that 66 were killed, 2 severely injured and over 20 slightly injured.

== Cause ==
The standing committee 33rd conference of Shanghai people's congress reviewed Vice Mayor Ni Tianzeng's report on the Lujiazui ferry casualties, and concluded that the accident was a concentrated reflection of problems such as the city's longstanding poor infrastructure, unsound management, the lack of rationality, and lack of systematic municipal construction planning. In response, they decided to ease the policy and to support in all aspects to improve the city's infrastructure and reduce major accidents.

First, in late 1980s, the citizens could only use ferries to cross the river. Most enterprises were located west of the river, so commuters flocked to the ferry station every morning. Lujiazui was the most crowded area in Pudong, and many people poured into Lujiazui station daily. A combination of long, heavy traffic, bad weather and having only one mode of travel led to the tragedy.

Second, the accident had some relation to the salary system that resulted in a bonus pay reduction for tardy employees. Several incidents of being late for work could lead to a total loss of quarterly and yearly bonus, which was a serious shock to the citizens at the time when income was generally low, and this incented commuters to squeeze aboard. So after the accident, the Shanghai government delivered an internal regulation that being late caused by the suspension of the ferry service could not be punished.

== Aftermath ==
Increased media attention from Shanghai Radio and Shanghai TV focused on fog and visibility conditions.

The government supported the construction of the tunnel of Yan'an East Way in order to allow safe and convenient travel for more citizens. Plans to build new bridges and tunnels were scheduled.

== See also ==
- 2014 Shanghai stampede
