= Star Ferry Public Transport Interchange =

Public transport interchange in Hong Kong

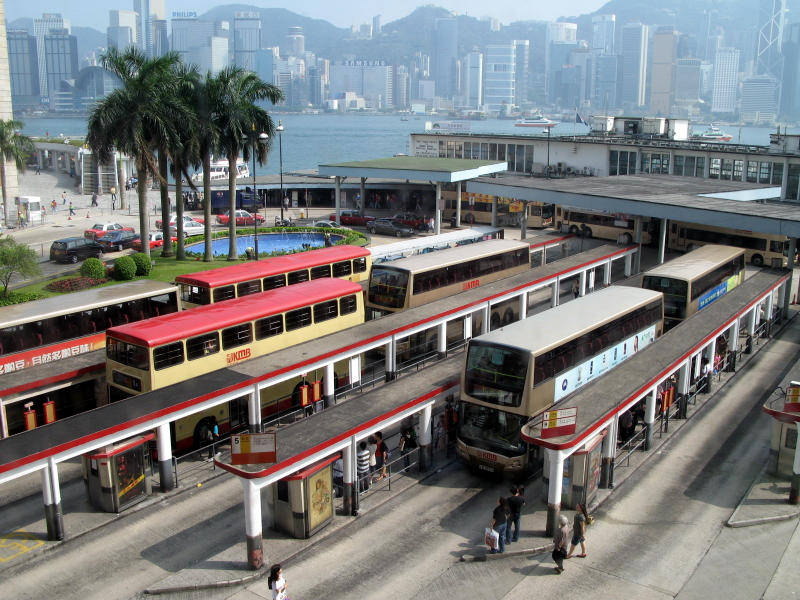

General information
- Location: Hong Kong
- Coordinates: 22°17′39″N 114°10′08″E
Location

The Star Ferry Public Transport Interchange is a public transport interchange and bus terminal at Star Ferry Pier, Tsim Sha Tsui, along Salisbury Road, in Kowloon, Hong Kong.
