= Lu Pin (artist) =

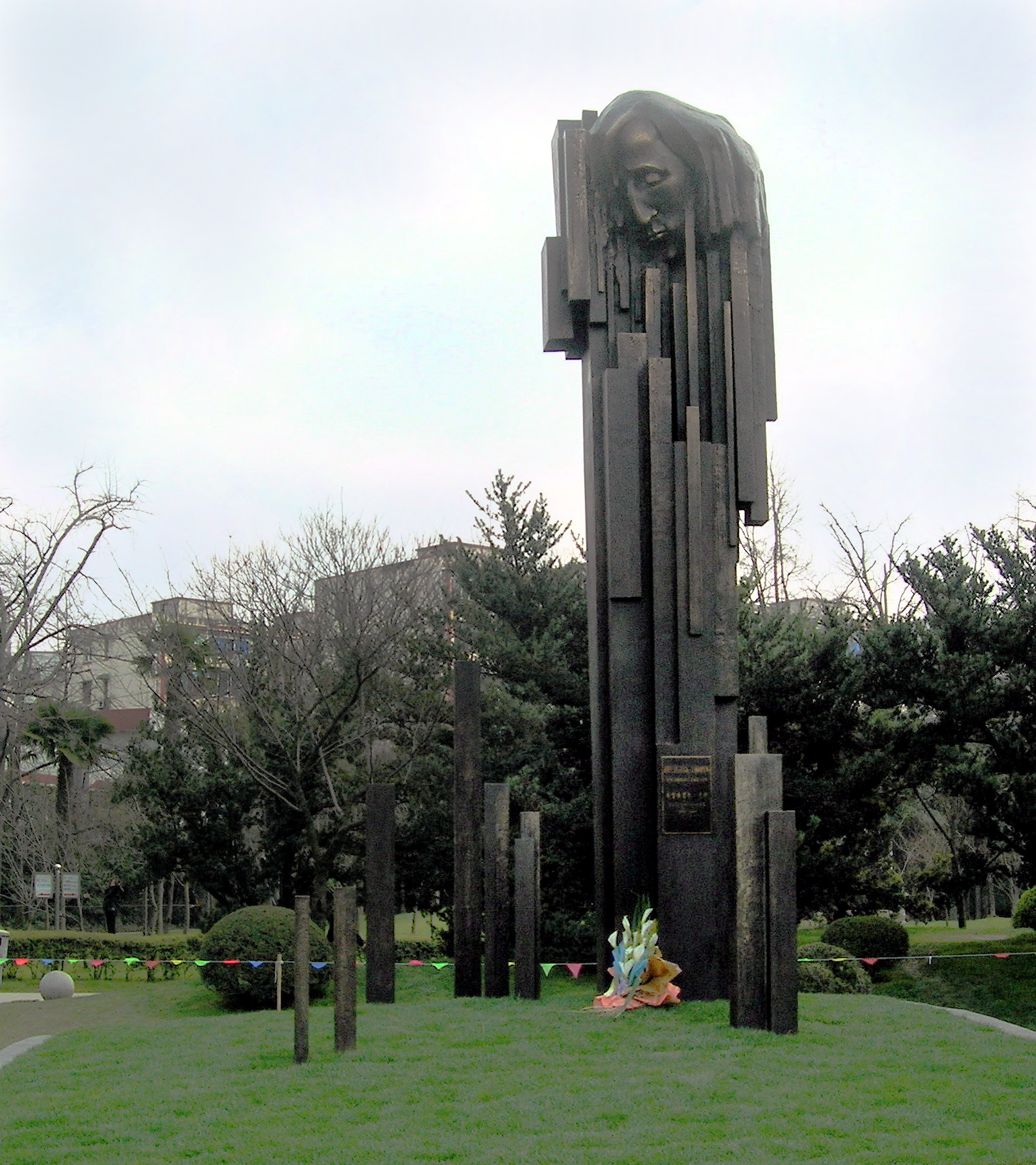
Monument to Frédéric Chopin by Lu Pin.

Lu Pin (born 1972 in Shanghai) is a Chinese sculptor. She completed her studies at the Academy of Fine Arts in Warsaw under the tutelage of professor Janusz Pastwa. Designed the monument to Frédéric Chopin in Shanghai's Zhongshan Park unveiled in 2007.
