= Chen Yi Square =

Square in Shanghai, China

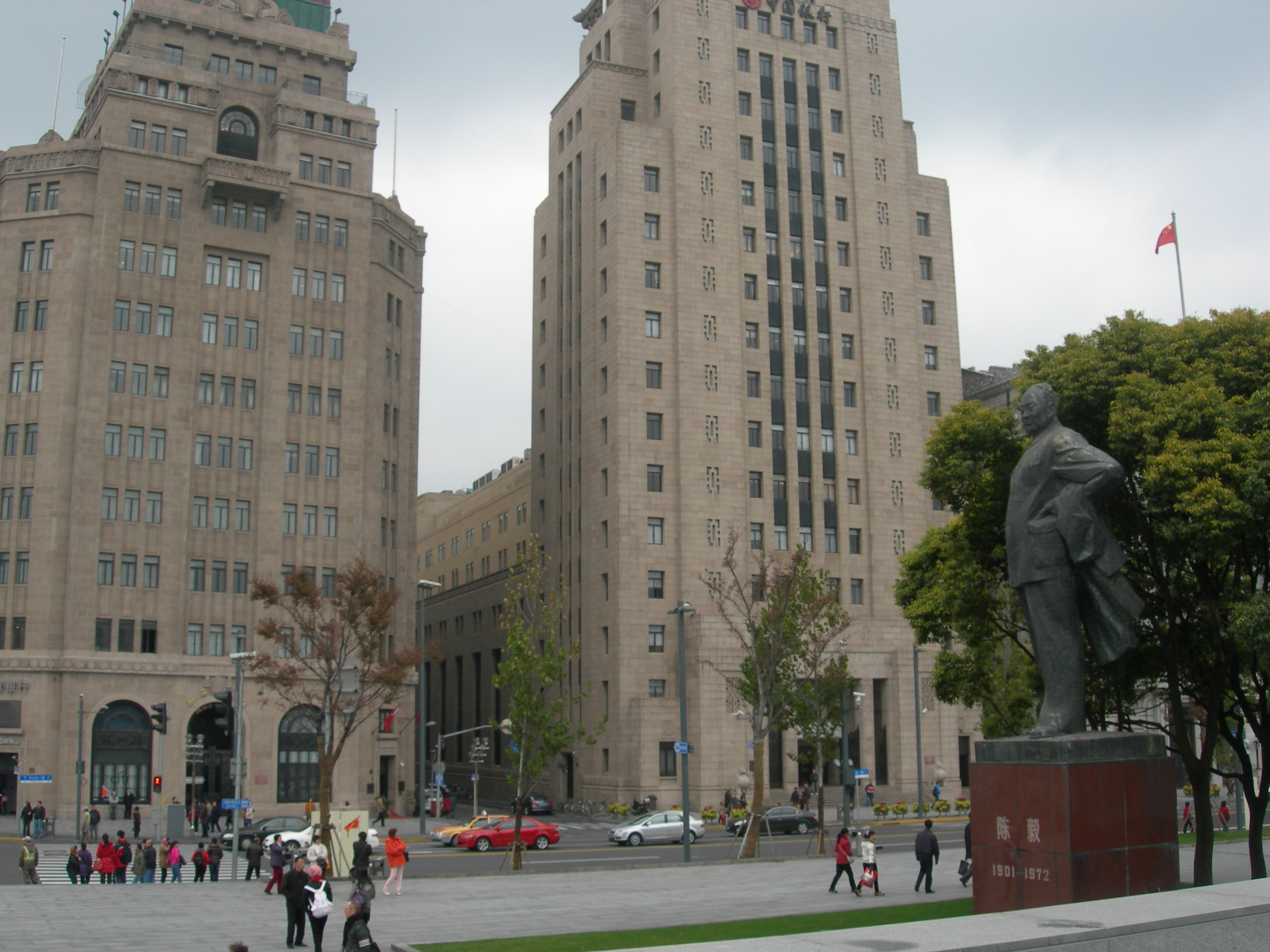
- The square in 2010
- Namesake: Chen Yi
- Type: Square
- Location: Shanghai, China

Other
- Known for: 2014 Shanghai stampede

Chen Yi Square is a square along The Bund in Shanghai, China. It features the only bronze sculpture of Chen Yi, the city's first community mayor.

== History ==
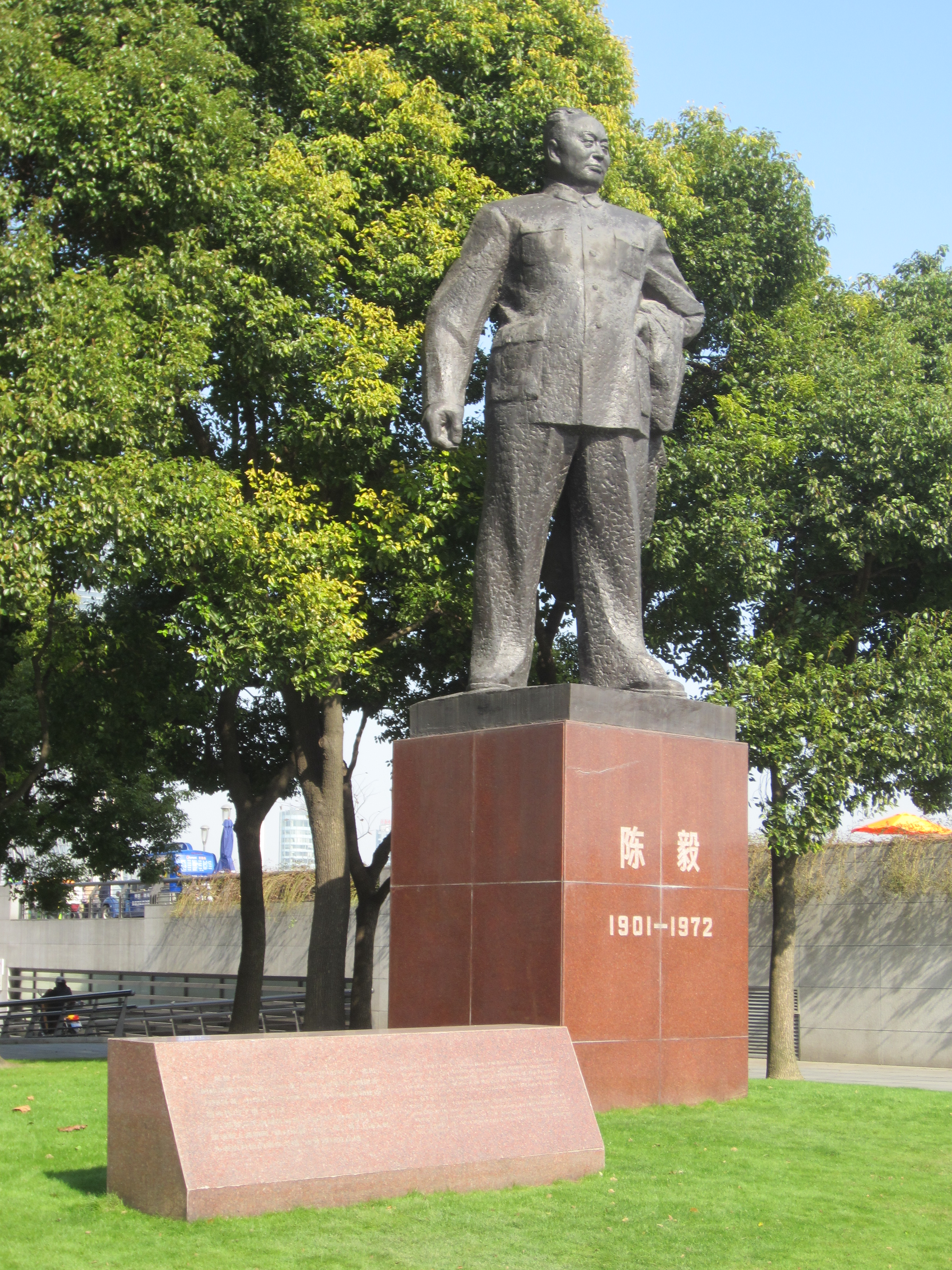
Statue of Chen Yi

Chen Yi Square is one of four squares built along The Bund in 2010 (the three others are the Bund Financial Square, Huangpu Park, and the Observatory Plaza).

A stampede occurred on December 31, 2014 near the square. At least 36 people were killed and 47 injured in the incident. A large crowd, estimated at around 300,000, had gathered for the new year celebration.
