= Three Heads Six Arms =

Sculpture by Chinese artist Zhang Huan

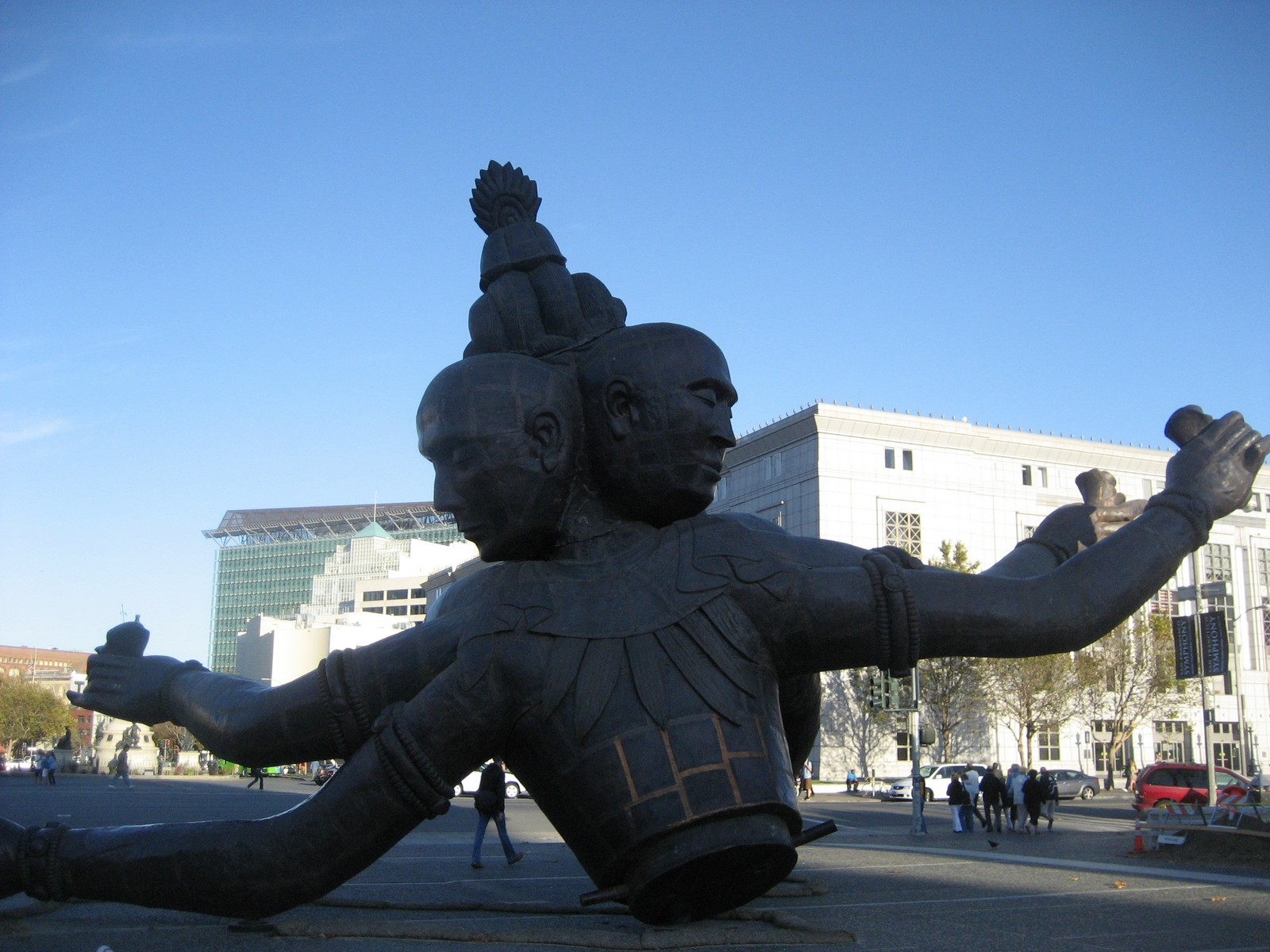
- The sculpture in San Francisco, California (2010)
- Artist: Zhang Huan
- Year: 2008
- Type: Sculpture
- Medium: Copper; steel
- Location: 2008–10: Shanghai; 2010–11: San Francisco, California, U.S.; 2011: Hong Kong; 2012; 2014–present: Beijing; 2013: Florence, Italy
- Website: Official site

Three Heads Six Arms (Chinese: 三頭六臂; pinyin: Sān tóu liù bì) is a sculpture by Chinese artist Zhang Huan. The work, composed of copper and steel, is 27 feet (8.2 m) tall and weighs 15 short tons (14 t). From May 2010 to February 2011, the sculpture was installed at the Joseph L. Alioto Performing Arts Piazza in San Francisco's Civic Center, before moving to Hong Kong later that year from May to July. A slightly modified version was exhibited in Florence in 2013.

The copper sculpture is the artist's largest work to date. Three Heads Six Arms is part of a larger series of monumental works by Zhang depicting the arms, legs, feet, hands, and heads of Buddhist sculptures.

== History and reception ==
Three Heads Six Arms was completed in 2008 and kept initially at Zhang Huan's studio near Shanghai, China. The San Francisco Arts Commission (SFAC) contacted Zhang in 2009 to enquire if he would be willing to loan the piece to San Francisco in honor of the 30-year sister city relationship between Shanghai and San Francisco, which was to be celebrated during 2010. The Shanghai–San Francisco agreement commenced on January 28, 1980, and is one of the oldest sister-city relationships between the United States and China. The sculpture's installation would also coincided with the 2010 World Expo, hosted by Shanghai and complement the Asian Art Museum's Shanghai exhibition, which was one of the cornerstones of the sister-city anniversary celebration. The Asian Art Museum is housed in the former main branch building of the city's public library, adjacent to Civic Center Plaza, where the sculpture was eventually installed. The piece was part of an art exchange: California artist Chase Chen (the older brother of actress Joan Chen) loaned The Sprout to Shanghai indefinitely, where it was installed in front of the former No. 3 Steel Factory. The Sprout was recycled from a 23-short-ton (21 t) cauldron.

The artist and Pace Gallery (his New York representative) agreed to loan the piece at no charge; the first official announcements were made in mid-January 2010, under the name Three-Headed, Six-Armed Buddha. At the time, the cost of shipping the statue to San Francisco was expected to reach $100,000, and funding for the shipment was uncertain. Formal plans were announced within a week. Senator Dianne Feinstein intervened to lift a hold that Customs had placed on the sculpture during its entry at Long Beach. Shipping services were donated, and the National Endowment for the Arts provided a $70,000 public arts grant to help cover installation costs. Atthowe Fine Art Services (based in Oakland) designed the transportation and installed the piece, carefully choosing the site so the statue was supported sufficiently, since Civic Center Plaza lies atop an underground parking garage and exhibition hall.

Three Heads Six Arms was formally dedicated by Mayor Gavin Newsom on May 12, 2010, before a crowd of 200. Early public impressions of the sculpture were favorable, although staff writers for the San Francisco Examiner called it "striking, bizarre and fairly overwhelming." Later that night, the SFAC and the Asian Art Museum hosted a public program featuring a conversation between Zhang Huan and the Museum's Michael Knight, senior curator of Chinese art and deputy director of strategic programs and partnerships. It was fenced off for three weeks in June 2010 after it had attracted graffiti declaring "Jesus is the one", in anticipation that future crowds and parade-goers might also damage the statue. Although at least one attempt was made to extend the loan, the temporary installation and sculpture were dismantled on February 15, 2011, after its one-year lease from the Chinese government expired.

After its tenure in San Francisco, the sculpture was exhibited at 1881 Heritage by the Edouard Malingue Gallery in Tsim Sha Tsui, Hong Kong, from May 23 to July 17, 2011, coinciding with Zhang's first solo exhibition there. The sculpture was honored at the annual Americans for the Arts convention in June 2011. The sculpture was acquired by 2012 for the permanent collection of the Parkview Green art and retail campus in Beijing; it has since been displayed at the outdoor garden there, with a temporary loan from July 8 to October 13, 2013, to Forte di Belvedere in Florence, Italy, as part of Zhang's Soul and Matter exhibition. By 2013, when it was exhibited in Florence, the appearance was updated by highlighting the weld joints between plates with bright copper.

== Design and construction ==
The meaning behind the form of Three Heads Six Arms is the transcendental spirit of challenging one's personal limits, of challenging the very limits of mankind.

— Zhang Huan, San Francisco Chronicle (June 13, 2010)

The Buddhist sculpture-inspired series was sparked by several fragments of Buddhist statues that had been purchased by the artist in a Tibetan market; they were remnants from larger works that were destroyed during the Cultural Revolution. Zhang retired from performance art shortly after moving from New York City to Shanghai and acquiring the first fragments.

Three Heads Six Arms, completed in 2008, was the largest piece in the series to date, measuring 800 cm × 1,800 cm × 1,000 cm (26 ft × 59 ft × 33 ft). Zhang started with draft sketches in ink. Based on these drafts, his assistants created a scale model in clay measuring approximately 152 cm × 152 cm × 91 cm (5 ft × 5 ft × 3 ft), which was used to build another model in steel and glass. The hands and body of the steel and glass model were used by the copper workshop to build the sculpture. For shipping, the sculpture can be broken into nine pieces; it took three days to assemble the sculpture on Civic Center Plaza using a team of eight to ten people, a forklift, and a crane. The sculpture is assembled from the inside; the arms are used as exits until the last arm is attached, and a hidden trapdoor in one head allows the technicians to leave the completed piece.

The faces were created by adding clay over a welded steel armature; the clay-and-steel buck was used as a form to shape the hammered copper skin. After the copper skin was formed, the pieces were welded together to form the head. The sculpture was inspired by Zhang's connection of the Chinese folk religion protection deity Nezha with Tibetan Buddhist sculptures; of the three faces, two used human features (including a self-portrait of the artist) and the other one retained the Buddha's features. The weld joints were deliberately left unfinished. According to Zhang: "When using pieces of copper to make Buddhist images, I like to keep the original character of the copper and the traces of the welding. For me, pieces of copper are like stitched skin after an operation."

== Derivative works ==
A smaller version entitled Small Three Heads Six Arms (Chinese: 小三頭六臂; pinyin: Xiǎo sān tóu liù bì) was completed in 2011, measuring 135 cm × 244 cm × 156 cm (53 in × 96 in × 61 in); it was shown at the Storm King Art Center near Mountainville, New York, in 2014.

For the 2014 Taoyuan Land Art Festival in Taoyuan, Taiwan, a similar copper and steel sculpture with multiple heads and arms entitled The Six Paths of Transmigration (Chinese: 六道轮回; pinyin: Liù dào lún huí) was on display at the decommissioned Taoyuan Air Base between September 4 and September 14, 2014. This sculpture was slightly smaller than the earlier Three Heads Six Arms (2008) at 1,026 cm × 1,228 cm × 832 cm (34 ft × 40 ft × 27 ft).

== See also ==
- Art in the San Francisco Bay Area
