= Hehe Xiexie =

Sculpture by Zhang Huan

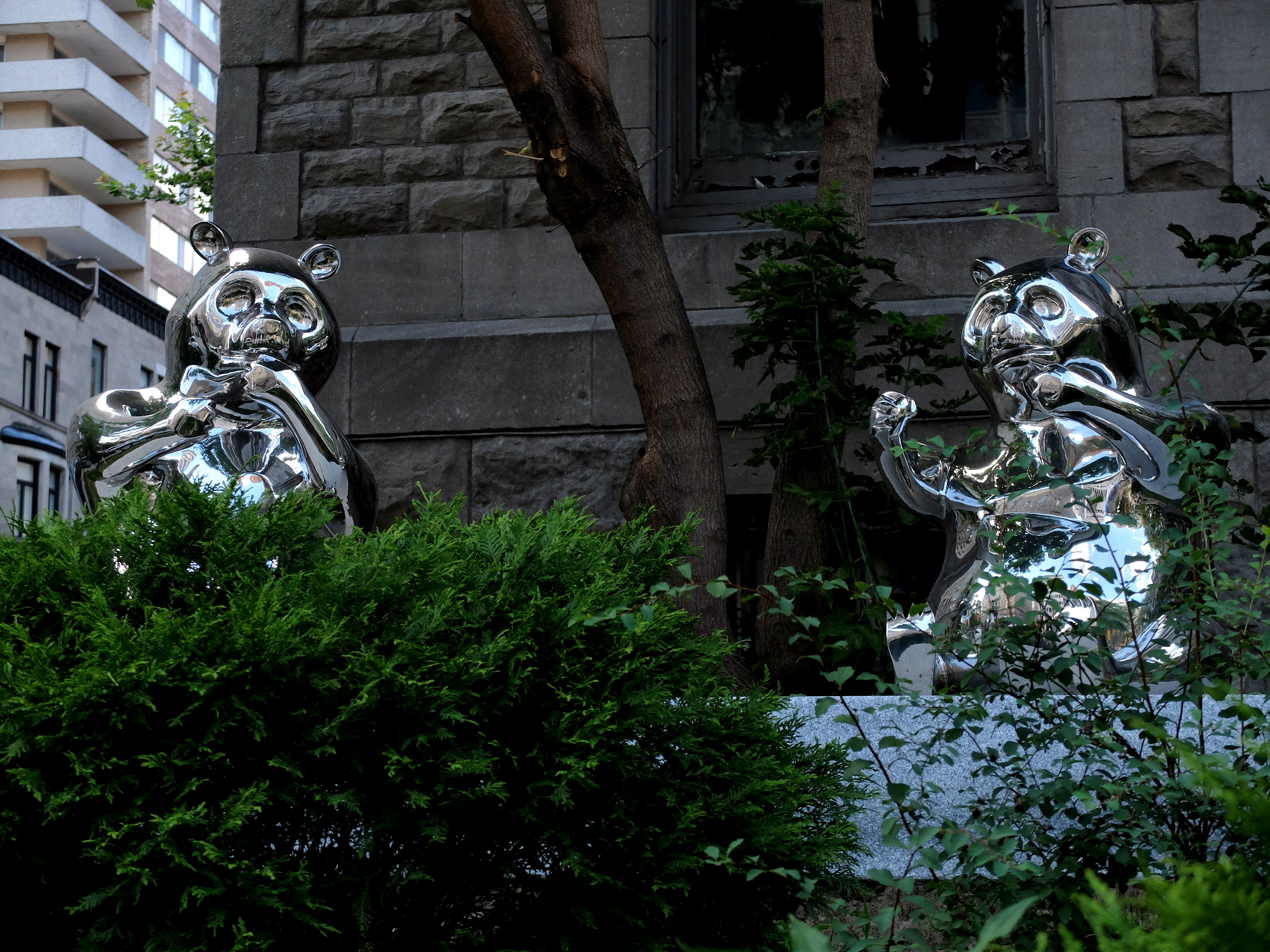
- Reduced version in Montreal in 2017
- Artist: Zhang Huan
- Year: 2009–2010
- Type: Sculpture
- Medium: Stainless steel
- Subject: Giant pandas
- Location: Shanghai, China

Hehe Xiexie, or Hehe, Xiexie, is an outdoor 2009–2010 sculpture created by Zhang Huan as part of Art for the World, a collection of twenty monumental sculptures along the Expo Axis organised by Jean-Gabriel Mitterrand, for Expo 2010. It is still installed at Expo Boulevard in Shanghai, China.

A reduced version is presented at Sherbrooke street, Montréal, in Canada.

== Description and reception ==
Hehe Xiexie depicts two "cuddly" Giant pandas which, according to Huan, represent a "harmonious society, harmonious world [and] harmonious Expo." They are made of mirror-finished stainless steel and measure 600 centimetres (20 ft) x 420 centimetres (13.8 ft) x 380 centimetres (12.5 ft) and 600 centimetres (20 ft) x 426 centimetres (13.98 ft) x 390 centimetres (12.8 ft). They were manufactured by Zhang Huan Studio and donated by Tomson Group as part of the Collection World Expo.

CNN Travel's Jessica Beaton and Hunter Braithwaite called the piece a "great" and "harmonious" photo opportunity.

== See also ==
- 2010 in art
