= 2014 Shanghai stampede =

Deadly crush of people at a new year celebration

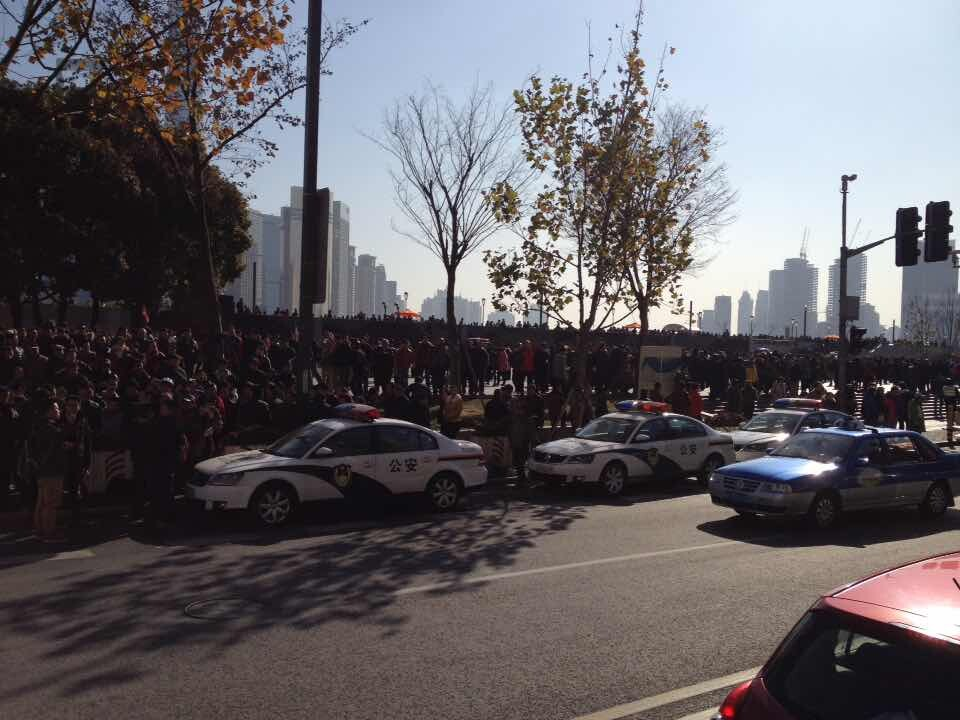
- Aftermath
- Native name: 2014 年跨年夜上海外滩陈毅广场踩踏事件
- Date: 31 December 2014
- Time: c. 23:35 BJT (UTC+8)
- Location: The Bund, Shanghai, China; 31°14′16.9″N 121°29′10.1″E
- Deaths: 36
- Injuries: 49

On 31 December 2014, a deadly crush occurred in Shanghai, near Chen Yi Square on the Bund, where around 300,000 people had gathered for the new year celebration. Thirty-six people were killed and another 49 were injured, and of those 49 injured, 13 were injured seriously.

== Cause ==
The incident began at about 23:35 local time on New Year's Eve. The crush centered on a stairway leading up to a viewing platform overlooking the river. Some people were trying to climb to the platform while others were trying to go down, causing panic and confusion. People standing on the steps to the viewing platform began to fall down the stairs, collapsing into each other.

There were reports that a planned New Year's light show had been canceled at the last minute and that the crowd control measures required for such a show were not in place.

=== Rumors of cash coupons ===
External videos
- Video (in Chinese)

Early reports stated that people were throwing cash coupons resembling U.S. dollars into the crowd. One of the victims stated that cash coupons were thrown onto the street from a bar and that several of the people had rushed to grab them. However, the Shanghai police later denied social media reports that the stampede was triggered by people stopping to pick up coupons, saying that "video footage showed that the bills had been thrown after the crush took place". An 18-year-old witness told news portal Sina: "I've seen people saying that the stampede happened because people were throwing fake money. But I don't think that's the main reason — there was so much distance, there's no way the money could have blown over to the viewing platform."

== Rescue ==
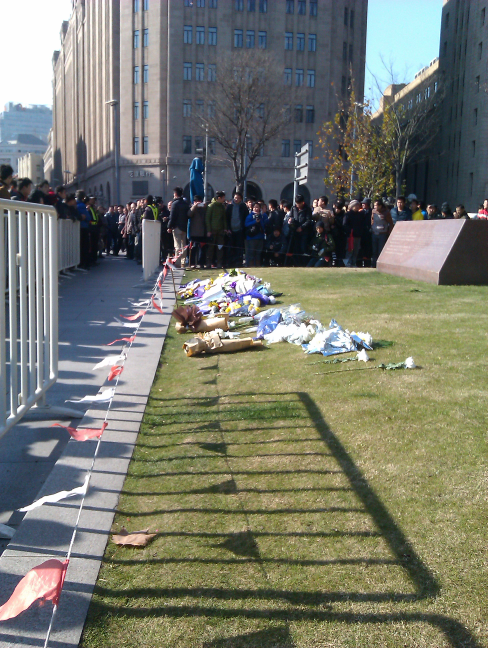
Site near the stampede on 1 January

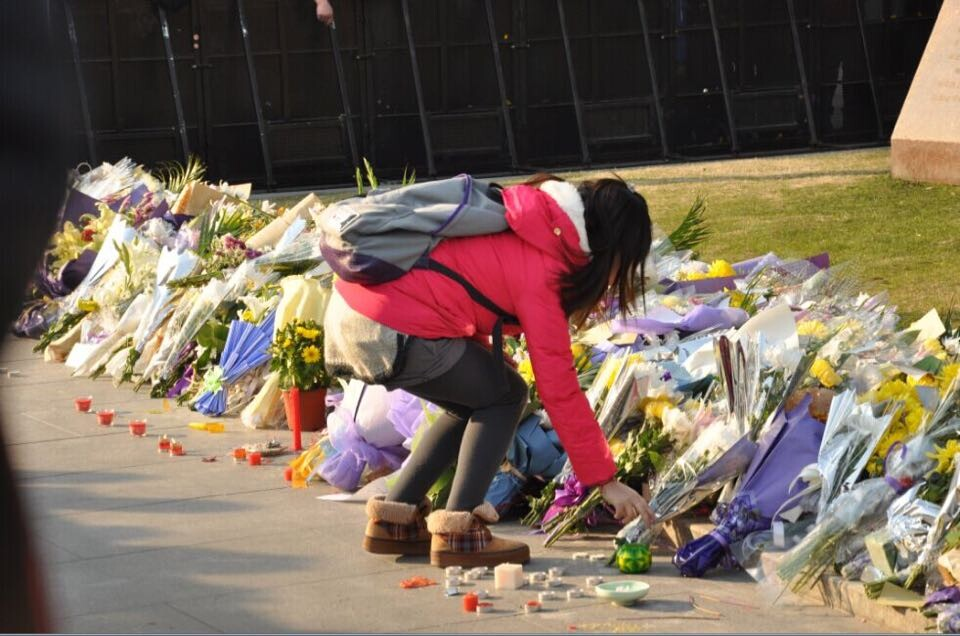
A mourner lays flowers for the victims

At approximately 23:50, people started to realize the danger and began to retreat from the crowd. The police at the scene also started to instruct people to evacuate from the second level. At 23:55, police and citizens had formed a wall to make way for ambulances. The injured were then sent to local hospitals.

After the incident, the government of Shanghai formed a working group to coordinate the rescue, led by mayor Yang Xiong.

The identities of all victims were confirmed, according to the local government. The youngest victim was 12 years old. As a result of the stampede, similar New Year celebration events on 31 December 2014 were cancelled.

== Response ==
=== Central government ===
President and General Secretary of the Communist Party Xi Jinping and Premier Li Keqiang ordered the Shanghai government to "go all out" in its rescue efforts. On 1 January, Xi and Li called for an immediate investigation into the source of the incident. Xi Jinping also said a profound lesson should be learned from the incident.

=== Shanghai government ===
The local government cancelled all New Year celebration activities on 1 January, including the New Year's marathon and Shanghai Tower light show. Guyi Garden, Fangta Garden and Yu Garden's Lantern Festival were also cancelled. On the morning of the 1st, citizens mourned for the victims at the Bund.

=== Media ===
This stampede was front page on local newspapers on the morning of 1 January. The media needed to seek authorization for reporting the incident, which was impossible to obtain at midnight. The official WeChat account of local government released relevant news at 9 a.m. the next day.

Media reports indicated that the cancellation of a planned light show led to a reduction in the number of police assigned to the event, resulting in only 700 police officers (as compared to 6000 in 2013) at the scene. However, the crowd was no smaller than in previous years, possibly because a scaled-down version of the light show was being held at a different venue with a similar name.

Media outlets have faced criticism for publishing personal information posted online by victims or their families.

== See also ==
- 1987 Shanghai stampede
