= Drago Marin Cherina =

Croatian artist

Drago Marin Cherina (born 1949) is a Croatian sculpting artist, who was naturalized Australian in the years 1970.

== Life and career ==
Cherina was born in Osijek, Croatia. He moved to England, where he worked as an assistant to Henry Moore. He came to Australia in 1975 to do a bust of Prime Minister, Gough Whitlam, and liked the place so much he arranged to be naturalized in Gough's office. He currently lives in Taiwan.

=== Works ===
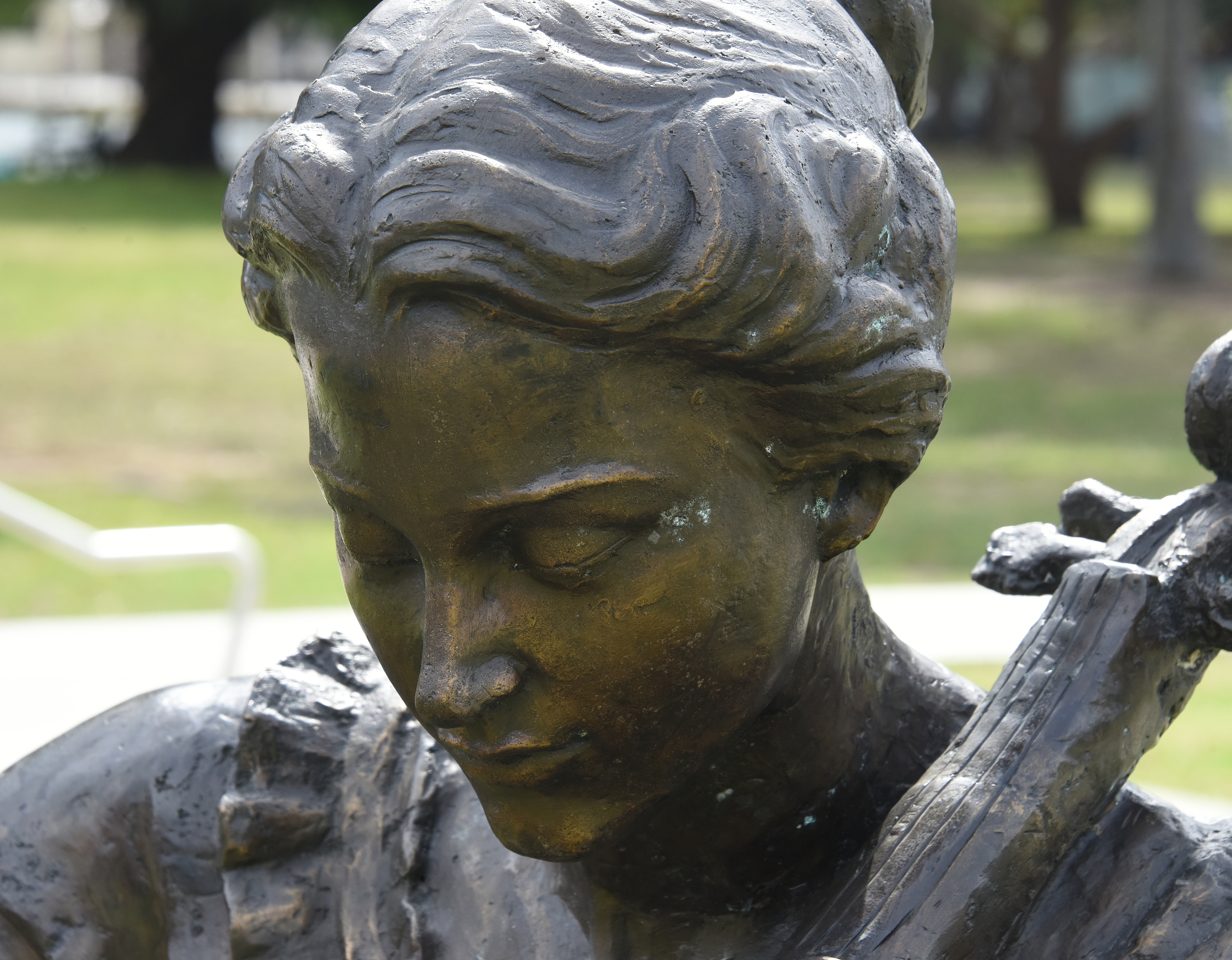
Cherina sculpture of Jacqueline du Pré at Kensington, Sydney

Notable works include The Mathy a bronze statuette awarded to the annual winner of the IFAC Australian Singing Competition and a bust of Alexander Solzhenitsyn that is held at the National Library of Australia.

A bronze sculpture of cellist Jacqueline du Pré, by Cherina, was installed at the Kensington Park Community Centre in Kensington, Sydney, in 2018.

A bust of Mahatma Gandhi is installed in Shanghai's New Town Central Park.

A six metre high, six tonne abstract artwork depicting prolific sculptor Henry Moore located in Banjo Paterson Bush Park in Yeoval, New South Wales, Australia.
