= Salisbury Garden =

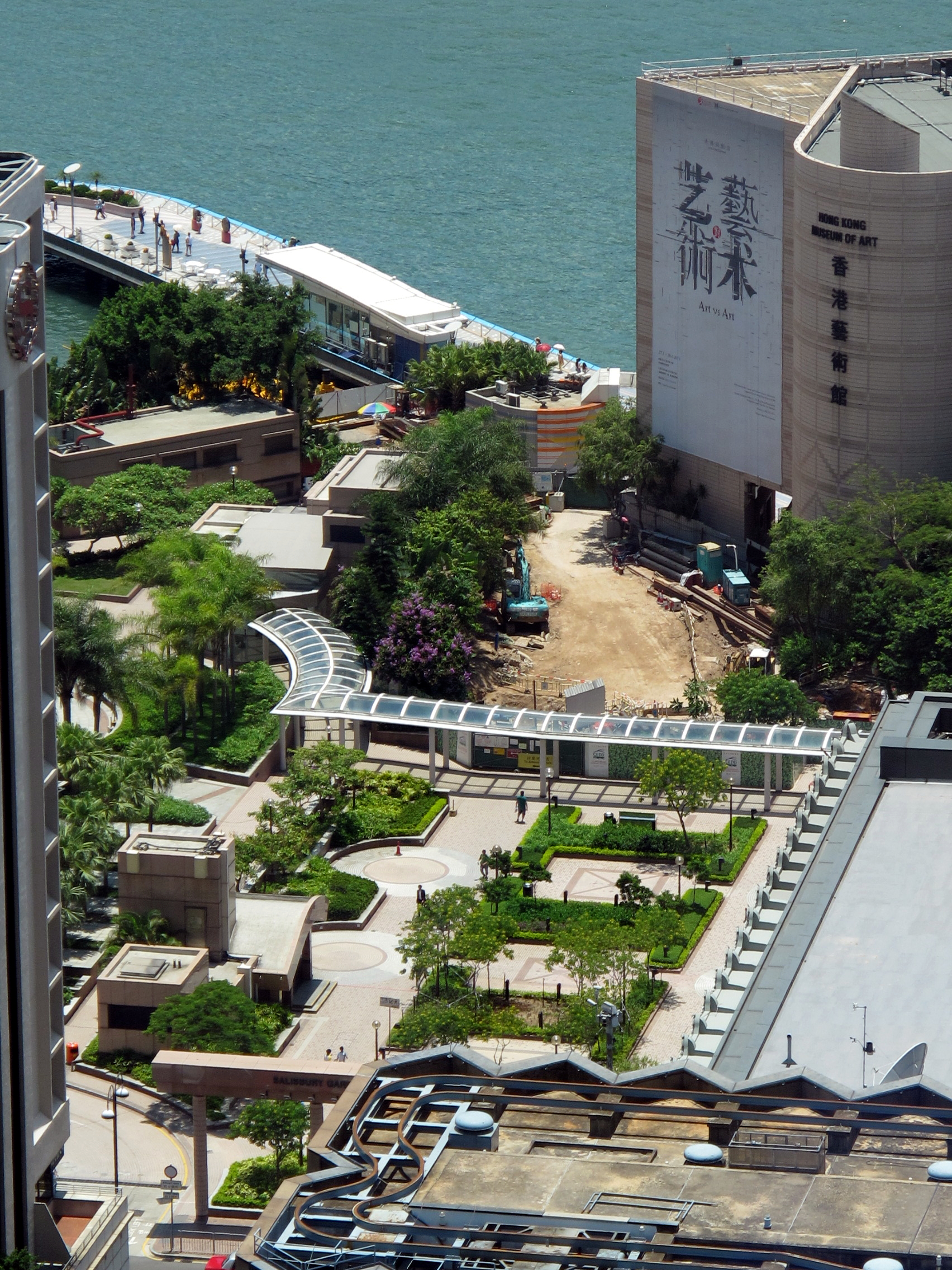
- Aerial view of the garden in 2011
- Interactive map of Salisbury Garden
- Coordinates: 22.29399°N 114.17290°E

Salisbury Garden is a public space between the Hong Kong Museum of Art and Hong Kong Space Museum, along Salisbury Road in Tsim Sha Tsui, Kowloon. At the centre is a fountain, with patches of trees on two sides to provide shades for pedestrians.

The Art Square at Salisbury Garden opened in 2014.
