= Sino Chart =

Record sales chart in China

The Sino Chart was a sales chart in China established in 2009. Chart rankings were based on physical record sales (album, EPs and singles), and did not include download sales.

Charts were published every Sunday for paid members and, on Mondays, were released on their official website.

On April 26, 2015, the site officially closed.

== List of number one albums ==
=== 2013 ===
Issue date	Album	Artist	Ref.
May 5	Stories Untold (因你而在)	JJ Lin	
May 12	21	Adele	
May 19	21	Adele	
May 26	Red	Taylor Swift	
June 2	The Flying Thief (会飞的贼)	Yico Zeng	
June 9	Extra Terrestrial Biological Entities	Egoist	
June 16	Unlock (卸)	Bibi Zhou	
June 23	Unlock (卸)	Bibi Zhou	
June 30	21	Adele	
July 7	Unlock (卸)	Bibi Zhou	
July 14	Silly Tango (傻瓜探戈)	Hu Xia	
July 21	Who Are We? (我们是谁)	Black Panther	
July 28	Regenerate Remixes (拾伍 重唱集)	Yu Quan	
August 4	The Rooftop OST	Jay Chou	
August 11	XOXO (Hug edition)	Exo-M	
August 18	I Know You Are Not Far From Me (我知道你离我不远)	Chen Chusheng	
August 25	5th Anniversary Live Selection	Kalafina	
September 1	Pinnacle (登"封"造极)	Vision Wei	
September 8	Pinnacle (登"封"造极)	Vision Wei	
September 15	Play Girl (花花女孩)	Liu Xin	
September 24	Autumn: Stories (秋：故事)	Sodagreen	
September 29	Autumn: Stories (秋：故事)	Sodagreen	
October 13	Autumn: Stories (秋：故事)	Sodagreen	
October 20	Chasing Dreams (追梦敢不敢)	2013 Super Boy	
October 27	Graceland (恩賜之地)	Shang Wenjie	
November 3	Autumn: Stories (秋：故事)	Sodagreen	
November 10	An Unexpected Journey (意外)	Joker Xue	
November 17	An Unexpected Journey (意外)	Joker Xue	
November 24	Talk About Love (情话)	Liang Xu	
December 1	XOXO (Repackage)	Exo	
December 8	Avril Lavigne	Avril Lavigne	
December 15	Born in Hesitation (生来彷徨)	Wang Feng	
December 22	Insignificance (渺小)	Hebe Tien	
December 29	Insignificance (渺小)	Hebe Tien	

=== 2014 ===
Issue date	Album	Artist	Ref.
January 5	Just Love (爱，不解释)	Jason Zhang	
January 12	Just Love (爱，不解释)	Jason Zhang	
January 19	Just Love (爱，不解释)	Jason Zhang	
January 26	Miracles in December (Chinese version)	Exo-M	
February 9	Just Love (爱，不解释)	Jason Zhang	
February 16	Miracles in December (Chinese version)	Exo-M	
February 23	Miracles in December (Chinese version)	Exo-M	
March 2	The Best of 2008–2012	G.E.M.	
March 9	Kepler (克卜勒)	Stefanie Sun	
March 16	Kepler (克卜勒)	Stefanie Sun	
March 23	Kepler (克卜勒)	Stefanie Sun	
March 30	Kepler (克卜勒)	Stefanie Sun	
April 8	Kepler (克卜勒)	Stefanie Sun	
April 13	Kepler (克卜勒)	Stefanie Sun	
April 20	Emperor Fantasy (王者幻想)	Li Yundi	
April 27	Dangerous World (危险世界)	Khalil Fong	
May 4, 2014			
May 11, 2014			
May 18, 2014			
May 25, 2014			
June 8, 2014			
June 15, 2014	Rice & Shine (米•闪)	Eason Chan	
June 22, 2014	Frozen: Original Motion Picture Soundtrack	Various artists	
June 29, 2014	Rice & Shine (米•闪)	Eason Chan	
July 6, 2014	Warm Water (温水)	Yisa Yu	
July 13, 2014	Warm Water (温水)	Yisa Yu	
