= Scott Freeman (voice actor) =

American convicted sex offender and actor (born 1979)

- Born: Scott Justin Freeman; June 20, 1979 (age 47); Dallas, Texas, U.S.
- Occupation: Voice actor
- Years active: 2006–2015
- Spouse: Bellamy Britten Boeske (m. 2012; div. 2014)
- Criminal information
- Status: Released
- Conviction: Possession of child pornography (8 counts)
- Penalty: 3 years

Scott Justin Freeman (born June 20, 1979) is an American voice actor and convicted sex offender. He is known for his work for Funimation, most notably as Shusei Kagari in Psycho-Pass, Issei Hyodo in High School DxD, Oogumo in Guilty Crown, England in Hetalia: Axis Powers, Takashi Kosuda in B Gata H Kei, Yuji Sakamoto in Baka and Test, Pierce Aogami in A Certain Magical Index, and Hayato Narita in We Without Wings.

== Legal issues ==
On April 5, 2014, Freeman was charged with eight counts of possession of child pornography. On July 30, 2015, he pleaded guilty to all charges as part of a plea bargain, waiving his right to a jury trial. He was sentenced to three years in the Texas Department of Criminal Justice. In response, Funimation announced that they had terminated their relationship with Freeman, and his ongoing roles were replaced with other voice actors.

Freeman served his sentence at the Joe F. Gurney Unit in Anderson County, Texas until he was paroled on October 24, 2018. Freeman lived in Papillion, Nebraska from 2018 until 2020. As of April 2024, he lives in Grove, Oklahoma.

== Filmography ==
=== Anime ===
List of dubbing performances in anime
Year	Title	Role	Notes	Source
2007-14	One Piece	Yasopp, Kamakiri, Hamburg	Replaced by Jeff Johnson	
2010	Soul Eater	Harvar D. Eclair		
2010-13	Hetalia: Axis Powers	England	Seasons 1–5, replaced by Taliesin Jaffe in Season 6 and Steven Kelly in Season 7	
2011	Baka and Test	Yūji Sakamoto		
2011	Ga-Rei: Zero	Kazuki Sakuraba		
2011	Chaos;Head	Mamoru Suwa		
2011	Black Butler	Timber, Thompson, Canterbury		
2011	Future Diary	Tarou "Taa-kun" Nanba		
2012	Sekirei: Pure Engagement	Ashikabi		
2012	B Gata H Kei	Takashi Kosuda		
2012	Freezing	Kyoichi Minase		
2012	Psycho-Pass	Shusei Kagari		
2012	A Certain Magical Index	Pierce Aogami	Seasons 1–2, replaced by Patrick McAlister in Season 3	
2012–2015	Fairy Tail	Bickslow, Eido	Replaced by Tyler Walker as Bickslow	
2013	Blood-C	Shinichirō Tokizane		
2013	Toriko	Starjun		
2013	Last Exile: Fam, the Silver Wing	Shiva		
2013–14	High School DxD	Issei Hyodo	Seasons 1–2, replaced by Jessie Grelle in Seasons 3-4	
2013	Guilty Crown	Oogumo		
2013	We Without Wings	Hayato Narita		
2014	Soul Eater Not!	Harvar D. Eclair		
2014	Attack on Titan	Ian Dietrich	Replaced by Garret Storms in Attack on Titan: Junior High	
2014	The Devil Is a Part-Timer!	Mitsuki Sarue/Sariel	Replaced by Kyle Igneczi in The Devil is a Part-Timer!! (season 2)	
2014	Senran Kagura	Murasame		
2015	The Rolling Girls	Tatsuhiko	Final voice acting role	

=== Film ===
List of dubbing performances in direct-to-video and television films
Year	Title	Role	Notes	Source
2011	Eden of the East: Paradise Lost	Yudai Hirose		

=== Video games ===
List of voice performances in video games
Year	Title	Role	Notes	Source
2014	Smite	Agni, Thanatos		
2014	Borderlands: The Pre-Sequel	Doctor Minte, Ascended Eternal #2, Lazlo, Saint, TR4-NU		
