= Extra Terrestrial Biological Entities =

Extra terrestrial Biological Entities

Studio album by Egoist
- Released: September 19, 2012
- Genre: J-pop
- Length: 48:23
- Label: Sony Music
- Producer: Ryo

Singles from Extra terrestrial Biological Entities
- 1. "Departures (Anata ni Okuru Ai no Uta)" Released: November 30, 2011; 2. "The Everlasting Guilty Crown" Released: March 7, 2012

Extra terrestrial Biological Entities is the sole studio album of the Japanese J-pop band Egoist, released on September 19, 2012, by Sony Music. The album contains 12 music tracks written by Ryo of Supercell and sung by Chelly, who also wrote the lyrics for the song "LoveStruck". Two of the tracks were previously released on two of Egoist's singles. Two different editions of the album were released: a regular CD version and a CD+DVD limited edition. Extra terrestrial Biological Entities peaked at No. 9 on the Japanese Oricon weekly albums chart.

Three of the songs were used as theme songs for various media: "Departures (Anata ni Okuru Ai no Uta)" and "The Everlasting Guilty Crown" were used as theme songs for the 2011 anime television series Guilty Crown, and "Planetes" was used as the ending theme to the original video animation included with the visual novel Guilty Crown: Lost Christmas.

== Production ==
From May 25 to June 19, 2011, Ryo of Supercell held auditions for the vocalist on the band's third album Zigaexperientia (2013). While not chosen to sing for Supercell, then 17-year-old female singer Chelly was selected out of about 2,000 candidates to sing songs for the 2011 anime television series Guilty Crown under the name Egoist, which is a fictional band featured in the series. Additionally, Chelly sings under the persona of the band's vocalist Inori Yuzuriha. At the time of the auditions, Ryo had already written "Departures (Anata ni Okuru Ai no Uta)" for Guilty Crown and was in search of a vocalist for the song. During the final audition, all of the candidates sang the song together, but according to Ryo, Chelly was the only one who fit the song perfectly. The album's title is meant to reflect Inori's character, including how her initial concept was based on a goldfish. The album's cover art is by Redjuice and shows Inori in a blue dress sitting down and holding a ball of red yarn; two goldfish are also depicted next to her.

== Release and reception ==
Extra terrestrial Biological Entities was released on September 19, 2012, in two editions: a regular CD version and a CD+DVD limited edition. The DVD contained music videos of the songs "Departures (Anata ni Okuru Ai no Uta)", "The Everlasting Guilty Crown", and "Planetes", in addition to a video featuring "Planetes" to promote the visual novel Guilty Crown: Lost Christmas. The album sold over 33,000 copies in September 2012, and on Oricon's weekly albums chart, it peaked at No. 9 and charted for 22 weeks.

== Track listing ==
All tracks are written by Ryo, except "LoveStruck" in which the lyrics were written by Chelly.

No.	Title	Length
1.	"Genzai no Tomoshibi" (原罪の灯 Light of Original Sin)	2:12
2.	"The Everlasting Guilty Crown"	5:25
3.	"Extra terrestrial Biological Entities"	5:39
4.	"Ame, Kimi o Tsurete" (雨、キミを連れて Rain, I'll Take You)	4:14
5.	"Lovely Icecream Princess Sweetie"	3:59
6.	"Teokure" (手遅れ Too Late)	3:24
7.	"LoveStruck"	4:27
8.	"Ce que j'aime (inori no kyuuzitu)" (What I Like (Inori's Day Off))	1:03
9.	"Omoi o Megurasu 100 no Jishō" (想いを巡らす100の事象 100 Events Enclosed with Feelings)	2:53
10.	"Kono Sekai de Mitsuketa Mono" (この世界で見つけたもの What I Have Found in This World)	4:49
11.	"Planetes"	6:03
12.	"Departures (Anata ni Okuru Ai no Uta)" (Departures ～あなたにおくるアイの歌～ Departures ～Love Song Sent to You～)	4:15
Total length:		48:23

== Personnel ==
Egoist

- Ryo – writer
- Chelly – vocals, chorus

Production

- Shunsuke Muramatsu – executive producer
- Yū Tamura – executive producer
- Ryōta Uchida – director, artist management
- Shunroku Hitani – mixer
- Masashi Kudō – mixer
- Hiroshi Tsujimoto – mastering
- Yōko Sakurai – product coordination
- Mami Kumagawa – artist management
- Tsuyoshi Kusano – art direction, design
- Hiro Kondō – design
- Redjuice – illustration
