= Egoist (band) =

Japanese musical duo

- Origin: Japan
- Genre: J-pop
- Years active: 2011–2023
- Labels: Aniplex (2011–2012); Sony Music Records (2012–2016); Sacra Music (2017–2023)
- Past members: Chelly; Ryo
- Website: www.egoist-inori.jp

Egoist was a Japanese pop music duo consisting of songwriter Ryo of Supercell and vocalist Chelly. Originally formed to produce theme music for the 2011 anime television series Guilty Crown, the group continued creating other songs after the end of the series including themes for other anime television series including Psycho-Pass and Kabaneri of the Iron Fortress. Egoist's debut album Extra terrestrial Biological Entities was released in September 2012.

== History ==
In 2011, Ryo of Supercell was tasked with composing theme music for the anime television series Guilty Crown. That year, Supercell held auditions from May 25 to June 19 for the vocalist on the band's third studio album Zigaexperientia (2013), and Ryo was also searching for the vocalist of Egoist, a fictional band featured in Guilty Crown. Out of about 2,000 candidates, then 17-year-old female singer Chelly was chosen to sing under the persona of the band's vocalist Inori Yuzuriha. Egoist's debut single "Departures (Anata ni Okuru Ai no Uta)" (Departures －あなたにおくるアイの歌－, Departures －Anata ni Okuru Ai no Uta－; "Departures (The Love Song for You)) was released on November 30, 2011; the song was used as Guilty Crown's first ending theme.

Egoist's second single is "The Everlasting Guilty Crown" released on March 7, 2012; the song was used as Guilty Crown's second opening theme. Included on Egoist's first two singles are remixes of the title songs by Boom Boom Satellites. Egoist's debut album Extra terrestrial Biological Entities was released on September 19, 2012. Egoist's third single "Namae no Nai Kaibutsu" (名前のない怪物; "The Nameless Monster") was released on December 5, 2012; the song is used as the first ending theme to the 2012 anime series Psycho-Pass.

Egoist's fourth single "All Alone With You" was released on March 6, 2013; the song is used as the second ending theme to Psycho-Pass. Egoist released the digital single "Suki to Iwareta Hi" (好きと言われた日; "The Day I Was Told I Love You") on November 6, 2013. Egoist's fifth single "Fallen" was released on November 19, 2014; the song is used as the ending theme to the 2014 anime series Psycho-Pass 2. The band's sixth single "Reloaded" (リローデッド) was released on November 11, 2015; the song will be used as the theme song to the anime film Genocidal Organ. Egoist's seventh single "Kabaneri of the Iron Fortress" was released on May 25, 2016; the song is used as the opening theme to the 2016 anime series Kabaneri of the Iron Fortress.

Egoist moved to the Sacra Music record label under Sony Music Entertainment Japan in April 2017. Egoist's eighth single "Eiyū: Unmei no Uta" (英雄 運命の詩; "Heroes: Song of Fate") was released on August 16, 2017; the song is used as the opening theme of the 2017 anime series Fate/Apocrypha. Egoist released the compilation album Greatest Hits 2011–2017 "Alter Ego" on December 27, 2017.

In November 2018, Chelly began the process of starting a solo career in addition to her work with Egoist. Designer Hayashi drew a logo for the singer, and she has already hired new staff, with whom she will continue her solo career. The domain and the name of the singer's personal Twitter account were also changed. Egoist's ninth single "Sakase ya Sakase" (咲かせや咲かせ) was released on May 15, 2019; the song is used as the theme song for the 2019 anime film Kabaneri of the Iron Fortress: The Battle of Unato.

The digital single "Saigo no Hanabira (the meaning of love)", announced during their 2020 tour "Chrysalizion code 404", was released on April 13, 2020, to celebrate Chelly's birthday. The song was composed by Korean composer M2U. Starting with that single, Ryo is no longer Egoist's composer, but will remain as its supervisor. The digital single "Zettai Zetsumei", released on June 16, 2021, is used as the theme song for the video game Azur Lane to celebrate its 4th anniversary on the Chinese server. The song was composed by M2U, returning from his previous work on "Saigo no Hanabira (the meaning of love)".

In September 2021, their first extended play (EP) Bang!!! was revealed to celebrate the band's 10th anniversary. The title track was used as the opening theme for the 2021 anime series Build-Divide: #000000 – Code Black, while their past digital singles "Saigo no Hanabira (the meaning of love)" and "Zettai Zetsumei" were included as B-sides along with the new song "Tonight Tonight". Bang!!! was released on November 30, 2021. Their 10th single "Gold" was released digitally on April 10, 2022, and physically on June 15, 2022; the song is used as the opening theme for the 2022 anime series Build-Divide: #FFFFFF – Code White. Their 11th single "Tōjisha" (当事者) was released on May 10, 2023; the song was used as the ending theme to the 2023 anime film Psycho-Pass Providence.

In August 2023, Chelly announced that Egoist will disband after two concerts in Osaka and Kanagawa on September 23 and October 9, respectively. Chelly has performed and will continue as a solo artist under the name Reche.

== Discography ==
=== Studio albums ===
List of albums, with selected chart positions and certifications
| Title | Album details | Peak positions | | | | Sales (JPN) (Note: Sales provided by Oricon database and are rounded to the nearest thousand copies.) |
| Title | Album details | JPN | KOR | KOR Overseas | TWN East Asian (Note: Positions were sourced as follows: Extra Terrestrial Biological Entities 2012 week 38, "Fallen" 2014 week 48 and 2015 week 1.) | Sales (JPN) |
|---|---|---|---|---|---|---|
| Extra Terrestrial Biological Entities | Released: September 19, 2012 (JPN); Label: Sony Music Records; Formats: CD, CD/DVD, digital download | 9 | 58 | 6 | 4 | 50,000 |

=== Compilation albums ===
List of albums, with selected chart positions
| Title | Album details | Peak positions | Sales (JPN) |
| Title | Album details | JPN | Sales (JPN) |
|---|---|---|---|
| Greatest Hits 2011–2017 "Alter Ego" | Released: December 27, 2017 (JPN); Label: Sacra Music; Formats: CD, CD+DVD, CD+BD, CD+BD+Egoistag 2011–2017 (Note: With a set of 10 original dog tags.) | 4 | 100,000 |

=== Extended plays ===
List of EP, with selected chart positions
| Title | EP details | Peak positions | Sales (JPN) |
| Title | EP details | JPN | Sales (JPN) |
|---|---|---|---|
| Bang!!! | Released: November 30, 2021 (JPN); Label: Sacra Music; Formats: CD, CD+DVD, CD+BD | 11 | 5,951 |

=== Singles ===
List of singles, with selected chart positions and certifications
| Title | Year | Peak chart positions | | | | Sales (JPN) | Certifications | Album |
| Title | Year | JPN Oricon | JPN Hot 100 (Note: Sources for chart positions are as follows: "Departures (Anata ni Okuru Ai no Uta)", "The Everlasting Guilty Crown", "Namae no Nai Kaibutsu", "All Alone with You", "Fallen", "Reloaded".) | TWN | TWN East Asian | Sales (JPN) | Certifications | Album |
|---|---|---|---|---|---|---|---|---|
| "Departures (Anata ni Okuru Ai no Uta)" (Note: (あなたにおくるアイの歌; "A Love Song I'm Sending to You")) | 2011 | 8 | 20 | — | — | 46,000 | | Extra Terrestrial Biological Entities |
| "The Everlasting Guilty Crown" | 2012 | 7 | 15 | — | — | 51,000 | RIAJ (digital): Platinum | Extra Terrestrial Biological Entities |
| "Namae no Nai Kaibutsu" (Note: (名前のない怪物; "Nameless Monster")) | 2012 | 6 | 9 | — | — | 41,000 | RIAJ (digital): Platinum; RIAJ (streaming): Gold | Greatest Hits 2011–2017 "Alter Ego" |
| "All Alone with You" | 2013 | 6 | 9 | — | — | 33,000 | RIAJ (digital): Gold | Greatest Hits 2011–2017 "Alter Ego" |
| "Suki to Iwareta Hi" (Note: (好きと言われた日; "The Day You Said You Loved Me")) (Note: Released exclusively as a digital single.) | 2013 | — | — | — | — | — | | Greatest Hits 2011–2017 "Alter Ego" |
| "Fallen" | 2014 | 9 | 8 | 19 | 1 | 28,745 | RIAJ (digital): Gold | Greatest Hits 2011–2017 "Alter Ego" |
| "Reloaded" (Note: Rirōdeddo (リローデッド)) | 2015 | 6 | 6 | — | — | 28,493 | | Greatest Hits 2011–2017 "Alter Ego" |
| "Kabaneri of the Iron Fortress" | 2016 | 2 | 4 | — | — | 30,341 | | Greatest Hits 2011–2017 "Alter Ego" |
| "Welcome to the *fam" | 2016 | — | — | — | — | — | | Greatest Hits 2011–2017 "Alter Ego" |
| "Eiyū: Unmei no Uta" (Note: (英雄 運命の詩)) | 2017 | 5 | 7 | — | — | 21,709 | | Greatest Hits 2011–2017 "Alter Ego" |
| "Sakase ya Sakase" (Note: (咲かせや咲かせ)) | 2019 | 8 | 11 | — | — | 13,352 | | Non-album singles |
| "Saigo no Hanabira (the meaning of love)" | 2020 | — | 53 | — | — | — | | Non-album singles |
| "Zettai Zetsumei" | 2021 | — | — | — | — | — | | Non-album singles |
| "Gold" | 2022 | 17 | — | — | — | 3,108 | | Non-album singles |
| "Tōjisha" | 2023 | 24 | — | — | — | | | Non-album singles |
"—" denotes items which failed to chart, or were ineligible to chart due to a physical edition not being released.

=== Music videos ===
| Year | Song | Director(s) |
|---|---|---|
| 2011 | "Departures (Anata ni Okuru Ai no Uta)" | |
| 2012 | "The Everlasting Guilty Crown" | |
| 2012 | "Planetes" | |
| 2012 | "Namae no Nai Kaibutsu" | Masakazu Fukatsu |
| 2013 | "All Alone with You" | Yuuichi Takahashi |
| 2014 | "Fallen" | |
| 2015 | "Reloaded" | Kazuaki"nkm"Nakamura (wamhouse) |
| 2015 | "Ghost of a smile" | Kazuaki"nkm"Nakamura (wamhouse) |
| 2015 | "Door" | Kazuaki"nkm"Nakamura (wamhouse) |
| 2016 | "Kabaneri of the Iron Fortress" | |
| 2016 | "Welcome to the *fam" | |
| 2017 | "Eiyū: Unmei no Uta" | |
| 2019 | "Sakase ya Sakase" | |
| 2021 | "Zettai Zetsumei" | |
| 2021 | "Bang!!!" | Hiroshi Kizu (P.I.C.S) |
| 2022 | "Gold" | Hiroshi Kizu (P.I.C.S) |
| 2022 | "Bang!!! (M2U Remix)" | Hiroshi Kizu (P.I.C.S) |
| 2023 | "Tōjisha" | Hiroshi Kizu (P.I.C.S) |
| 2023 | "Tōjisha (Psycho-Pass ver.)" | Yu Nakagaito |
