= List of Guilty Crown characters =

Main characters of Guilty Crown with Shu Ouma in the middle.

The anime Guilty Crown revolves around Shu Ouma, a high school boy who inadvertently obtains an ability called "Power of the King" that enables him to draw out items called "Voids" from other people. He is then thrown into the conflict between a quasi-governmental organization known as the GHQ and a resistance group called Funeral Parlor which aims to restore Japan's independence from the GHQ. In the process, Shu has to deal with the burden his ability puts on his shoulders and the horrific mystery of his past.

== Main characters ==
=== Shu Ouma ===
Voiced by: Yūki Kaji, Minami Tsuda (child) (Japanese); Austin Tindle, Kara Edwards (child) (English)

Shu Ouma (桜満 集, Ōma Shū) is the 17-year-old protagonist of Guilty Crown. A socially inept person, Shu is a second year high school student and a member of the school's modern image and video research club. His stepmother, Haruka, works for Sephirah Genomics, while his father, Kurosu, an expert on the Apocalypse Virus, is killed during the "Lost Christmas" incident. Shu's involvement in the series begins when he meets Inori Yuzuriha. After Inori is apprehended by the GHQ Anti-Bodies, Shu decides to make amends for not helping her earlier by delivering an item called "Void Genome" she was transporting to the leader of Funeral Parlor, Gai Tsutsugami. However upon arrival, a battle between the GHQ and Funeral Parlor has begun, forcing Shu to escape while protecting the Void Genome. It is then when he rescues Inori and protects her from a GHQ Endlave that the "Void Genome" fuses onto his right arm, granting him the "Power of the King", which allows him to extract items from a person's heart. After that incident, Gai suggests that Shu join Funeral Parlor, but Shu turns down the offer. However, when his classmate, Yahiro Samukawa, sells him out to the GHQ, Shu joins the organization.

Despite joining them, Shu stays with Funeral Parlor due to Inori, who he has feelings for, but he resents Gai, who he at first believe was Inori's lover, due to the fact Gai used his feelings for Inori to make him join Funeral Parlor and Gai is everything that he is not; smart, popular and well respected. But upon seeing the real Gai; a man conflicted to play a ruthless tactical genius and leader, earning Shu's respect for Gai and Funeral Parlor. After getting his name clear from the GHQ, Shu returns to school with a more open, sociable attitude much to his friends' notice. At the same time, Inori begins living with him and their feelings for each other grow as he starts getting flashback of forgotten memories. While still attending school, he continues helping Funeral Parlor in their missions. But his new attitude doesn't last long after Shu fails to save Yahiro's brother Jun as he was forced to kill him to save Yahiro's life. Traumatized on what he has done, Shu refuses to join Gai in an important mission to retrieve the meteorite where the Apocalypse Virus originated before it is transported out of Japan.

When his friend Hare slaps some sense into him and learns the Anti-Bodies have launched a coup d'état against the GHQ upper echelons by starting a second Apocalypse outbreak in Tokyo, stole the meteorite and decimate Funeral Parlor, Shu breaks out of his self-pity and decides to rescue Inori and his Funeral Parlor allies. With the help of his friends from school, Shu goes to rescue Inori and Gai from the GHQ and Anti-Bodies and faces the leader of the Anti-Bodies, Shuichiro Keido.

Encountering Yu, a boy working with Keido who also possess "Power of the King", Shu finally remembers his forgotten memories. It is revealed Gai was Shu's childhood friend, nicknamed Triton whom his older sister Mana rescued ten years ago. Gai looked up to Shu as he was a brave boy back then. Unknown to Shu or Gai, his sister was the first person to be infected by the Apocalypse Virus, which slowly drives her insane, even causing her to develop feelings for her brother. Gai, who knew the truth, tried to reveal this to Shu on the Christmas Eve of 2029. However, Mana found out about it and tricked Gai into shooting himself. Shu then stumbles upon the scene and is asked by Mana to marry her so that they 'can start a new race together.' Shu, disturbed and shocked, rejects her offer, calling her a 'monster.' Hurt at his remark Mana went berserk, causing the virus to take over her body and spread it all over Tokyo, thus beginning the "Lost Christmas" incident. Traumatized, Shu repressed these memories. With his memories regained, Shu rescues Inori from Keido's clutches in his plans to transplant Mana's soul into her body so he and Mana will spread the outbreak worldwide and start a new race. However, he is forced to kill Gai so that his weapon could break the pod containing his sister's soul, freeing her and ending the outbreak.

After the outbreak, Shu, Inori and their Funeral Parlor friends Ayase and Tsugumi stays at Tennouzu High after the school is converted into a refugee center. However, the area their school is located is barricaded and lock downed by the Anti-Bodies who proceed to exterminate the civilians inside. Due to uncertainty and despair, Shu replaces Arisa Kuhouin as the student council president after regaining control of a chaotic school assembly. After becoming student council president, he rules the school with dignity and respect and refuses Yahiro's suggestion to implement a Void-ranking system which determines how much vaccine and care someone receives, believing that it will lead to discrimination between the students. However, when Hare is killed during an attempt by Souta to find vaccines from a nearby hospital, Shu falls into despair and implements the ranking system. After the successful take down of the Tokyo Tower and the Ghost Team, Shu was betrayed by Arisa Kuhouin and his fellow students. The resurrected Gai then appears and slices off Shu's right arm, transferring the "Power of the King" from Shu to Gai. Subsequently, Shu slipped into a bout of extreme depression, horrified at his own actions. When Inori sacrificed herself to protect Shu, he came to terms with his actions, and became determined to save her. He then took Arisa hostage in order to have her lead him to Inori. While driving, he gets news that Haruka is on the run, and possesses the third Void Genome. Arisa takes him to the building where she, the remaining members of Funeral Parlor, and Shu's friends are hiding. Shu arrives shortly after Segai begins an assault to take the Void Genome for himself. Before Ayase attempts to use the Void Genome on herself at great risk, Shu finds it and injects himself with it. With Power of King returned to him, Shu pulls out his own Void, which manifests as a new right arm made entirely of Apocalypse crystal, replacing the one Gai severed. With their permission, he uses Ayase's, Souta's, and Yahiro's Voids, now memorized by his Void, to save them from Segai. The battle culminates in him using Yahiro's Void shears to sever Segai's life. Despite his new-found abilities, as a side-effect, Shu is infected with the Apocalypse virus while retrieving Souta's Void - immediately curing the terminal Souta. Shu makes the decision to use Power of the King to save Inori and stop Gai.

Shu acquired his powers from the "Void Genome". His power is to extract "Voids", genetic physical objects formed of the personality of anyone younger than 17. After regaining his lost memories, his powers evolved, allowing him to extract Voids from people while they still retained consciousness. He briefly lost his powers when Gai stole it, but regained them upon injecting himself with another "Void Genome". His Void can absorb other Voids into his own, allowing him to use its powers indefinitely. It manifests itself as an arm made entirely of Apocalypse Crystal, replacing the arm Gai severed off when he stole his powers. His void is a double-edged sword, however, as he also takes any adverse effects that the Void user has, such as the Apocalypse Cancer, and if by any reason Shu dies, all owners of the voids he obtained should perish as well. After defeating Gai, Shu tries to take all the Apocalypse Virus into himself, but Inori takes it instead, sacrificing herself. Sometime later, Shu is seen celebrating Hare's birthday with the others, and is presumably blind (he uses a white cane). He has a prosthetic limb and no longer has the Apocalypse Virus.

=== Gai Tsutsugami ===
Voiced by: Yuichi Nakamura, Akeno Watanabe (child) (Japanese); Micah Solusod, Terri Doty (child) (English)

Gai Tsutsugami (恙神 涯, Tsutsugami Gai) is the 17-year-old resourceful and charismatic leader of the "Funeral Parlor" resistance group. He hopes to push the revolution to success with the help of Shu's "Power of the King". A charming and yet manipulative man, he leads Funeral Parlor as a fearless leader who expects the best, without disappointment, from his subordinates. At the beginning of the series, he tasks Inori to steal the Void Genome so he can use its power. However, a battle between the Anti-Bodies and Funeral Parlor leads to Shu gaining that power instead. Nevertheless, he tries to make Shu join his organization, and succeeds after using his feelings for Inori, and after he was arrested by the GHQ.

Shu at first holds animosity toward Gai for manipulating him into joining Funeral Parlor (not making things any better is that Inori is rumored to be Gai's lover as well) and he is everything Shu is not; smart, popular and well respected. But upon seeing the real Gai; a man conflicted to play a ruthless tactical genius and leader, Shu gains a new respect for Gai and helps him in their missions. But after Shu refuses to join them for an important mission after being traumatized over killing Yahiro's brother, Gai abandons him to continue the mission; steal the meteorite that originated the Apocalypse Virus from the GHQ. However, the mission fails when Keido and the Anti-Bodies start a second Apocalypse outbreak over Tokyo and proceeds to eliminate both the upper echelons of GHQ and Funeral Parlor. While Gai and several members survive, Gai's Apocalypse infection starts to reemerge. A determined Shu arrives to save him from the Anti-Bodies, and he joins Shu to rescue Inori from the clutches of Keido.

Gai later reveals to Shu that he is in fact his childhood friend "Triton". Ten years ago, he was saved by Shu and Mana from drowning at a shore. Nicknamed "Triton" by Mana, Gai and the Ouma siblings became close friends and spent a summer together. During this time, he admired Shu for his confidence, and fell in love with Mana for saving him. He eventually discovers Mana's insanity and tries to warn Shu about it, but is tricked by Mana into shooting himself in a church. After the Lost Christmas incident, he leaves to make himself stronger, eventually becoming the leader of Funeral Parlor.

After helping Shu rescue Inori, Gai goes to free Mana's soul from the pod containing it. However, the crystals protecting the pod stab him. Close to death and pinned to Mana's pod, Gai requests that Shu stab him through the heart in order to break the pod and free Mana's soul. He seemingly dies embracing Mana, finally reunited with his lost love.

At the end of episode 16, Gai is resurrected by Shuichiro Keido and Haruka Ouma. He then reappears in episode 17, cutting off Shu's right arm with Inori's void, transferring the "Power of the King" from Shu's severed arm to himself. He becomes one of the story's main antagonists as he proceeds to aid Da'ath's plans to resurrect Mana, showing utter disregard for human lives in the process. However, after being defeated by Shu in the series' climactic final battle, he reveals his true goal was to free Mana from her cursed role as Eve so she could finally rest in peace. While admitting he also accepted the role of "the King" out of fear of being excluded from Da'ath's new humanity, he reveals he always secretly believed Shu would stop them in the end. He is last seen - presumably in Shu's mind - embracing Mana and dying with her, this time for good.

Gai has the ability to see people's Voids due to being infected with the Apocalypse Virus. To prevent the virus from crystallizing his body, he undergoes blood transfusions with Inori, as her blood can fight off the infection. To prevent anyone in Funeral Parlor from knowing, he has Inori visit his room during their blood transfusions, fooling everyone into believing that he and Inori are lovers. His Void is a gun that forces out other people's Voids, though it can also be used as a regular gun.

=== Inori Yuzuriha ===
Voiced by: Ai Kayano (Japanese); Alexis Tipton (English)

Inori Yuzuriha (楪 いのり, Yuzuriha Inori) is the main heroine of Guilty Crown, and the stoic 18-year-old vocalist of the group Egoist. She is also a member of the "Funeral Parlor" resistance group and her Void is a sword. She becomes Shu's partner and as the series progresses, begins to show different types of emotions, eventually falling in love with him. She's later revealed to be created by Da'ath to become the vessel of Mana, and in episode 12, she was captured to complete Mana's rebirth, but was then saved by Shu. Afterwards, however, she starts expressing more erratic behavior, cumulating with her killing two other students and stabbing Arisa through the hand. She is later captured by the resurrected Gai and Da'ath as she tries to protect Shu.

Inori's Void is a heavy sword that resembles a bisento, which can be combined with other Voids for different effects. When extracted by Yu, it takes a more wing-like shape. In Episode 18, she also demonstrates the ability to turn into a "monster" mode, where a pair of blades extend from her arms and she gains increased strength and speed. In episode 21 Inori is consumed and reborn as Mana. In the final episode, when Shu tries to take in all of the Apocalypse Virus into himself, Inori takes it instead, sacrificing herself so that Shu can live on, even so her soul lives within Shu as observed when both embrace at the end of the episode.

== Funeral Parlor ==
=== Ayase Shinomiya ===
Voiced by: Kana Hanazawa (Japanese); Emily Neves (English)

Ayase Shinomiya (篠宮 綾瀬, Shinomiya Ayase) is a paraplegic Endlave pilot who uses a wheelchair. She had feelings for Gai and was very loyal to him before returning as an antagonist in episode 17. Finally, she develops feelings for Shu from episode 12. Previously, she piloted an older Endlave Jumeau model before it was destroyed by Daryl but later gains Daryl's Endlave Steiner model. Her Void is a special pair of leg braces that allow her to rapidly skate over ground, jump with immense power and even fly. In the epilogue, it seems like she is the one looking after Shu and in daily contact with him.

=== Tsugumi ===
Voiced by: Ayana Taketatsu (Japanese); Monica Rial (English)

Tsugumi (ツグミ, Tsugumi) is a 14-year-old hacker who is in charge of information warfare. Her codename is "Black Swan" and her main site of operations is a holographic sphere where she uses her whole body as interface thanks to a special sensor suit. She also controls Funell when doing tasks Shu and Inori cannot do. Her Void is a Hand Scanner, a magical girl wand that can create holographic projections of people.

=== Argo Tsukishima ===
Voiced by: Anri Katsu (Japanese); Jarrod Greene (English)

Argo Tsukishima (月島 アルゴ, Tsukishima Arugo) is a 17-year-old member who is skilled in hand-to-hand combat and the use of knives. His Void is a torchlight that temporarily blinds its target in a sphere of complete darkness. He is a second-year student at Ryusen High School.

=== Oogumo ===
Voiced by: Kousuke Takaguchi (Japanese); Scott Freeman (English)

Oogumo (大雲, Ōgumo) is a large, quiet man who specializes in firearms and explosives. He was injured while protecting Haruka, and later killed by Segai.

=== Shibungi ===
Voiced by: Takehito Koyasu (Japanese); J. Michael Tatum (English)

Shibungi (四分儀, Shibungi) is a 27-year-old man who is Gai's second-in-command. He is known for saying: "As expected of Gai".

=== Kenji Kido ===
Voiced by: Nobuhiko Okamoto (Japanese); Greg Ayres (English)

Kenji Kido (城戸 研二, Kido Kenji) is a mass murderer and infamous terrorist responsible for the "Sky Tree Bombing". He was previously held at GHQ Isolation Facility Four before being rescued by Shu and the Funeral Parlor. His Void is a Gravity gun. He is a skilled hacker much like Tsugumi. He is shot by Shinbungi during the final battle when he figures out that Kenji is aligned with Gai and is preventing Tsugumi from hacking into the GHQ headquarters (as only Kenji is capable of hacking as well as Tsugumi).

=== Funell ===
Funell (ふゅーねる, Fyūneru) is Inori's pet robot who also acts as her guardian. It expresses a lot of emotions even though it is mechanical. Funell is capable of shooting out strings very much like a Tachikoma. Its name is a play on the English word "Funeral".

== Tennouzu High School ==
Yahiro Samukawa (寒川 谷尋, Samukawa Yahiro)
Voiced by: Takahiro Mizushima (Japanese); David Trosko (English)
Shu's classmate and member of the motion picture research club. Yahiro is one of Shu's close friends who bothers to socialize with him. Despite being seen as nice person, secretly he is a drug dealer by the name of "Sugar" and his image at school is actually a facade to hide his real anger. The reason he deals drugs is to pay for his little brother's medical bills. His Void is a pair of large shears that are said to sever life, this is because deep down he feels his ill brother burdens him. After the school is quarantined and Shu becomes president of the student council, Yahiro becomes his right hand man. He does several things to "ensure the school's safety," such as hide the fact that the destruction of a Void causes its owner to die. When Hare dies due to her Void being destroyed, he tells Shu it was because she was killed by a new genomic weapon, so that Shu wouldn't be afraid to utilize the power of the students' Voids to ensure their safety.
Souta Tamadate (魂館 颯太, Tamadate Sōta)
Voiced by: Daisuke Sakaguchi (Japanese); Corey Cleary-Stoner (English)
Shu's classmate and another member of the motion picture research club. He is a big fan of Inori. His Void is a camera-like gun capable of opening anything from doors to electronic safes. His void is among the weakest in the school, which leads him to carelessly embark on a mission to retrieve vaccines with other low-ranking students drawing attention to the GHQ and resulting in Hare's death, and Shu becoming a ruthless leader. Infected with the Apocalipse Virus, Souta is forced to work on hazardous condition according to Yahiro's plan, and ends up against Shu when he was betrayed by the other students. However, he entered the terminal stage of the disease until Shu made use of his void to absorb his power as well as the virus in his body, curing Souta by infecting himself in the process. Before the final battle, he and Shu make up, promising they'll always be friends, and is seen in the epilogue celebrating Hare's birthday.
Hare Menjou (校条 祭, Menjō Hare)
Voiced by: Yū Shimamura (Japanese); Tia Ballard (English)
Shu's classmate and close friend who has a crush on him. Her void is a bandage roll that can heal injuries and instantly repair damaged objects. Drawn into an attack in the fifteenth episode, she is ordered by Souta to repair a car - which explodes, mortally injuring her and Shu. Waking up, Hare uses her Void to heal Shu, but her Void is shot and destroyed, essentially killing Hare. Shu wakes up and hold her in his arms, only for her body to start crystallizing, and she shatters before his eyes.
Kanon Kusama (草間 花音, Kusama Kanon)
Voiced by: Minako Kotobuki (Japanese); Apphia Yu (English)
The chairman of Class 2-A and Hare's friend who knows about her feelings for Shu and usually helps her to get close to him. Her void is a visor that can see and locate things from afar. She has feelings for Yahiro. She joins the others and helps Shu when they decide to stop Gai.
Arisa Kuhouin (供奉院 亞里沙, Kuhōin Arisa)
Voiced by: Aya Endo (Japanese); Caitlin Glass (English)
The student council president. Her grandfather is the head of the Kuhouin Group which is at odds with the GHQ, and Arisa is his heir. She however doesn't want the responsibilities associated with it, but is unable to face it, resulting in her Void being named "The Coward's Shield", which is a disc-shaped shield controlled by a ball-shaped device. The shield can divide itself in 6 parts, and even grow in size. Arisa developed a crush on Gai when they met while he was asking her grandfather to help fund Funeral Parlor.
After the 2nd Apocalypse Outbreak, she takes leadership of Tennouzu High after the school is turn in a refugee center for teenagers. But after the government seals off the area where Tennouzu High is also located, the students begin to lose confidence in her despite assuring them her grandfather's men will rescue them. She loses her position of student council president after the students vote Shu as their new president but still continues to help the student council.
Arisa learns to truth that people die when their voids are destroyed but is attacked by Inori to keep her silent. Traumatized from the attack, Arisa receives a phone call from Gai who encourages her to attempt a coup d'état to overthrow Shu. To achieve this she seduces Hirohide Nanba to spread rumors about the truth of voids in order to further destroy their faith in him. Once Shu successfully leads the students out of quarantine zone, she and the students turn on him.
Arisa follows Gai when he takes control, despite initially having some doubts. When her grandfather, Okina, decides to kill her for shaming the Kuhouin family, she shoots and kills him. She follows Gai to the final battle, holding back the UN forces with her shield, and is alive seen being outside of the falling GHQ.

== GHQ ==
Major General Yan (ヤン少将, Yan Shōshō)
Voiced by: Takaya Hashi (Japanese); Jerry Russell (English)
The former Commander-in-Chief of the GHQ. General Yan is in charge of the GHQ forces in Japan, except for the Anti-Bodies, led by Keido. He is the father of Daryl Yan, but does not like his son, believing Daryl may not be his biological son. This belief also pushes him to have an affair with his secretary, Emily. Upon later discovering the theft of the meteorite (that caused the Apocalypse Virus) from a GHQ facility by Shuichiro Keido, the General has Keido put under house arrest and plans to have the meteorite transported overseas. Also hoping that this act will bring his political ambitions to become President of the United States to come true. But in the midst of the rebellion by Keido and the Anti-Bodies, General Yan and his staff are killed by Daryl, after he learns about his father's affair.
Shuichiro Keido (茎道 修一郎, Keidō Shūichirō)
Voiced by: Kazuhiko Inoue (Japanese); Charlie Campbell (English)
Head of the GHQ Anti-Bodies and one of the series' main antagonists. He is also the estranged older brother of Shu's stepmother, Haruka Ouma. As GHQ's leading scientific expert on the Apocalypse Virus, Keido's purported goal is to eradicate the epidemic by systematically isolating and exterminating infected members of the Japanese population. This proves to be a pretext for his true goal of realizing Da'ath's plot to trigger a worldwide outbreak and lay the foundation for a new human race. Towards the middle of the series, Keido puts his plans into motion by launching a coup against GHQ's commanding officer, Major General Yan, and unleashing the Virus across Japan once again.
In the past, Shuichiro Keido was an academic colleague and friend of Shu's late father, Kurosu Ohma. However, his respect towards Kurosu increasingly morphed into hatred as he witnessed the latter's success eclipse his own. During the events of Lost Christmas, Keido murdered his erstwhile friend in a fit of rage upon realizing his brilliance was at a level he could never hope to reach. From that moment forward, Keido became a man consumed by hatred and vengeance. Towards that end, he collaborates with the secret society, Da'ath, to unleash the Apocalypse Virus and destroy the world Kurosu tried to save. After his plans are ultimately foiled by Shu and Funeral Parlor, he commits suicide by injecting himself with the Virus, cryptically noting neither he nor Kurosu "won" in the end.
Daryl Yan (ダリル・ヤン, Dariru Yan)
Voiced by: Kōki Uchiyama (Japanese); Joel McDonald (English)
A 2nd Lieutenant Juvenile Officer and General Yan's son. Nicknamed "Kill 'Em All Daryl", he is a narcissistic, cruel, sadistic and unhinged individual who enjoys causing pain to others, and due to having mysophobia, he hates being touched by others, believing that they are infected. His Void is a weapon called "Kaleidoscope", which is able to create a myriad of barriers to deflect attacks. His father does not like him and even believes he may not be his biological son. Upon learning about his father's affair with his secretary, Daryl kills his father and his staff during the Anti-Bodies coup d'état. After the events of the second Apocalypse Virus outbreak, he is sent by Major Segai to go undercover at Tennouzu High. He starts to get suspicious with the orders and events in the Loop. He ends up having feelings for Tsugumi. He is almost consumed by the Apocalypse Virus during the final battle by overusing his Void, but is saved when Shu absorbs all of the Apocalypse Virus.
Makoto Waltz Segai (嘘界=ヴァルツ・誠, Segai Varutsu Makoto)
Voiced by: Nobutoshi Canna (Japanese); John Swasey (English)
A Major in the GHQ Anti-Bodies and a major antagonist. A charming, eccentric man wearing clown-like make up and a prosthetic left eye. He is a sharp and experienced man who is able to investigate and get any information from its sources. He enjoys chatting with people and playing games on his cellphone, yet, at the same time, he is very sadistic and manipulative and uses whatever means against anyone. He's for the most part calm, and remains like that even if he's in dangerous situations. He seems to enjoy his work like a game, although he does take his job seriously. As Keido's second-in-command, he and the Anti-Bodies free Keido from his house arrest by causing another Apocalypse Virus outbreak. After Keido gave Major Segai the information he wanted, and declared his role in the coup d'état over, Major Segai helps Gai, Ayase and Haruka locate where Keido was. After the events of the 2nd Apocalypse Virus outbreak, Major Sagai becomes the new leader of the Anti-Bodies. Major Sagai also becomes interested in the Void Genome and decides to gain it for himself to embrace the Void's light. However, Shu regains the Genome and kills Major Segai with Yahiro's Void.
Haruka Ouma (桜満 春夏, Ōma Haruka)
Voiced by: Chika Fujimura (Japanese); Martha Harms (English)
Shu and Mana's stepmother. She works as a senior researcher at Sephirah Genomics, a pharmaceutical company in charge of developing a cure for the Apocalypse Virus. She was an assistant under Shu's father Kurosu before becoming engaged to him, and while a professional at work, at home she is very carefree and likes to dote on her son much to his embarrassment. Strangely Shu calls her by name. She was oblivious to her son's involvement with the Void Genome or Funeral Parlor until the truth was revealed during Keido's coup d'état. After the second Apocalypse Virus outbreak, she works with Keido to find a way find a way to relieve Shu of the Void Genome. It is reveal that Keido is her older brother. After finding out that her brother killed Kurosu, she stole the last Void Genome and defected GHQ to help Shu and the Funeral Parlor.
Rowan (ローワン, Rōwan)
Voiced by: Naoya Nosaka (Japanese); Kyle Phillips (English)
A GHQ Anti-Bodies Intel Officer. Rowan usually assists his superior officers. He was also involved in Keido's coup d'état. He sacrifices himself to help Daryl escape from the collapsing GHQ headquarters.
Dan Eagleman (ダン・イーグルマン, Dan Īguruman)
Voiced by: Tsuguo Mogami (Japanese); Patrick Seitz (English)
An American GHQ Colonel. A former football coach, he is an upbeat man who gives pep talks to his subordinates and uses the word "Guts" a lot. He is also very irresponsible and tends to work with low, if any, efficiency, using a vast amount of resources for rather simple tasks, or use resources in the most absurd way possible, such as turning Anti-Air Missile Vehicles sideways so they can be launched straight rather than upwards. He was killed by Major Segai during Keido's coup d'état while saving Haruka.
Yu (ユウ, Yū)
Voiced by: Yuka Nishigaki (Japanese); Leah Clark (English)
A mysterious blond boy who is an acquaintance of Keido. During Keido's coup d'état and the second Apocalypse Virus outbreak, Yu is revealed to also possess "Power of the King" when he kidnaps Inori and uses her Void to kill Shu, only for Gai to save him. Gai recognizes him by the title "Grave Keeper of Da'ath". Yu eventually reveals himself as a member of Da'ath, a powerful secret society strongly implied to be the prime mover behind the Apocalypse Virus outbreak.

== Other characters ==
Jun Samukawa (寒川 潤, Samukawa Jun)
Voiced by: Minami Tsuda (Japanese); Brina Palencia (English)
Yahiro's younger brother. He had been affected with the Apocalypse Virus, which led Yahiro to become a drug dealer so that he could get treatment for the virus from the GHQ. Jun is killed by Yahiro's Void after begging Shu to kill him, as he does not want to die hating Yahiro or to burden his elder brother any longer.
Okina Kuhouin (供奉院 翁, Kuhōin Okina)
Voiced by: Katsuhisa Houki (Japanese); R Bruce Elliott (English)
Arisa's grandfather and head of the Kuhouin Group, the richest and most powerful conglomerate in Japan. Okina despises the GHQ for not only taking away Japan's independence but also their restrictive policies affecting his various businesses. Sharing a common enemy, Okina agrees to supply Gai and Funeral Parlor with funds and weapons. After the 2nd Apocalypse outbreak, he rescues Argo and Ogumo and tasks them to rescue his granddaughter after Loop 7 is quarantined by the GHQ. However, the mission fails and much to his dismay, Arisa joins the GHQ Anti-Bodies due to her unrequited love for Gai. For dishonoring their family name, he and his men ambushed her convoy where he plans to kill her himself. However, he is hesitant to kill her, and Arisa kills her grandfather in self-defense.
Kurachi (倉知, Kurachi)
Voiced by: Miyuki Kawashō (Japanese); Jamie Marchi (English)
Okina's secretary. Kurachi is well informed on the events on what's happening between the GHQ and its enemies. After Okina death, she leads on what's left of the Kuhouin Group. She is also an old friend of Haruka.
Kurosu Ouma (桜満 玄周, Ōma Kurosu)
Voiced by: Toshihiko Seki (Japanese); Todd Haberkorn (English)
Shu's late father. He was an expert on the Apocalypse Virus who died during Lost Christmas. It was later revealed that Keido killed him out of hatred.
Mana Ouma (桜満 真名, Ōma Mana)
Voiced by: Ai Kayano (Japanese); Alexis Tipton (English)
A pink-haired girl who has a mysterious connection with Shu, Gai, and Inori. She is ultimately revealed to be Shu's older sister. Ten years prior to the start of the series, Shu and Mana rescued a young Gai, whom Mana nicknamed Triton. The three of them became close friends, spending the summer together. However, unknown to anyone else, Mana was the first person to become infected with the Apocalypse Virus, which gradually caused her to become mentally unstable, even causing her to have feelings for Shu, unaware that she was his sister. Gai discovered this and tried to warn Shu, but Mana showed up at their meeting and tricked Gai into shooting himself. When Shu arrived, Mana proposed to Shu, stating that they could "start a new race together". Shocked and disturbed at the scene, Shu rejected her offer, calling her "a monster". Heartbroken, Mana went berserk, causing the virus to mutate and spread all over Tokyo, causing the Lost Christmas. Mana's body was eventually destroyed by the virus. This event affected Shu and Gai deeply, and the two split just after the incident, with Gai vowing to 'become stronger.' It is also at that time that Shu, traumatized, repressed his memories of Gai and Mana.
During the second Apocalypse outbreak and Keido's coup d'état, Keido manages to capture Mana's soul, still under the influence of the virus, and tries to resurrect her using Inori's body. However, his attempts are foiled by Shu and Gai. To free Mana's soul and be with her in her last moments, a dying Gai sacrifices himself to allow Shu to stab the crystal pod containing Mana's soul through his body, finally freeing Mana's soul from the virus. However, this is revealed to be false, as Mana's soul has already entered Inori's body and begins to take over, as seen by Inori's psychotic behaviour. In episode 21, Mana fully takes control of Inori's body and begin to spread the Apocalypse virus throughout the world. However, a fragment of Inori's soul remains and helps Shu and his friends stop the spread of the Apocalypse virus. She's last seen, presumably in Shu's mind, embraced by Gai, finally able to be free from her role as Eve and dies with him.

== Guilty Crown: Lost Christmas ==
Scrooge (スクルージ, Sukurūji)
Voiced by: Takahiro Sakurai
The protagonist. His body had received so many certain experiments on humans in a research facilities. "Scrooge" is his code name while his real name is unknown. Escaped from the facility, and continues to live as a fugitive. He is a "failed product" of the research facility's attempts to produce the Void Genome. Instead of being able to draw out a weapon based on a person's heart, any person Scrooge touches with his right hand is instantly crystallized by the Apocalypse Cancer. The only person who is unaffected by his right hand's power is Carol, and she is the only person Scrooge is able to draw a Void out of.
Carol (キャロル, Kyaroru)
Voiced by: Kana Asumi
A beautiful girl with strange mood. Scrooge's partner, having escaped with him from the facility. She is also deemed by the research facility as a "failed product". Carol is the only one who is resistant to the crystallization effect of Scrooge's right hand; however, her Void does not have a definite form, and takes a different shape each time Scrooge draws it out.
Past (パスト, Pasuto)
Voiced by: Ayahi Takagaki
One of the three people called "Ghosts", that chase Scrooge and Carol, along with the other two "Ghosts". Past's abilities are unknown. He is an Endlave pilot whose entire identity is concealed within his specially customized unit. His Endlave was not built for mass production, but has been modified heavily and given stronger destructive power, and is considered overkill for any practical military operation.
Present (プレゼント, Purezento)
Voiced by: Yū Kobayashi
One of three people called "Ghosts", that chase Scrooge and Carol for some reason, along with the other two "Ghosts". Present is a mysterious person whose fate is intertwined with Scrooge and Carol. Present's gender is unknown, but has a beautiful and sleek appearance. Present's abilities include further manipulation of the effects of the Apocalypse Virus. Present is able to also crystallize many people over a certain radius, and can freely manipulate Apocalypse Crystal Matter.
Yet to Come (イェット・トゥー・カム, Ietto tū Kamu)
One of three people called "Ghosts", that chase Scrooge and Carol, along with the other two "Ghosts".
