= Guilty Crown =

Japanese anime television series and its franchise

- Cover of the first Blu-ray volume

ギルティクラウン (Giruti Kuraun)
- Genre: Action; Dystopia; Political thriller
- Anime television series
- Directed by: Tetsurō Araki
- Produced by: Ryō Ōyama; Kōji Yamamoto; George Wada; Masae Minami; Makoto Kimura
- Written by: Hiroyuki Yoshino
- Music by: Hiroyuki Sawano
- Studio: Production I.G Division 6
- Licensed by: AUS: Madman Entertainment; NA: Crunchyroll; SEA: Mighty Media; UK: Manga Entertainment
- Original network: Fuji TV (Noitamina)
- English network: SEA: Animax Asia
- Original run: October 13, 2011 – March 22, 2012
- Episodes: 22
- Manga
- Written by: Yōsuke Miyashiro
- Illustrated by: Shion Mizuki
- Published by: Square Enix
- Magazine: Monthly Shōnen Gangan
- Original run: October 12, 2011 – November 12, 2013
- Volumes: 7
- Novel

Guilty Crown: Princess of Deadpool
- Written by: Gan Sunaku
- Illustrated by: Production I.G; Nitroplus; Redjuice
- Published by: Nitroplus
- Published: April 25, 2012
- Manga

Guilty Crown: Dancing Endlaves
- Written by: Gan Sunaaku
- Illustrated by: Ryōsuke Fukai
- Published by: ASCII Media Works
- Magazine: Dengeki G's Magazine
- Original run: May 30, 2012 – March 28, 2014
- Volumes: 3
- Original video animation

Guilty Crown: Lost Christmas
- Directed by: Shinpei Ezaki
- Written by: Norimitsu Kaihō
- Music by: Hiroyuki Sawano
- Studio: Production I.G
- Released: July 26, 2012
- Runtime: 15 minutes
- Video games
- Guilty Crown: Lost Christmas (2012); Guilty Crown (2019)
- icon

Guilty Crown (Japanese: ギルティクラウン, Hepburn: Giruti Kuraun) is a 2011 Japanese anime television series produced by Production I.G which aired on Fuji TV's Noitamina program block from October 13, 2011.

The story revolves around Shu Ouma, a high school boy who comes into possession of an ability called the "Power of the King" allowing him to draw out items called "Voids" from other people. He is then thrown into the conflict between a quasi-governmental organization known as GHQ and a rebel organization called Funeral Parlor which aims to restore Japan's independence from the GHQ. In the process, Shu has to deal with the burden his ability puts on his shoulders and the horrific mystery of his past.

Two manga adaptations were published, one each by ASCII Media Works and Square Enix. A light novel was published by Nitroplus in April 2012, titled Guilty Crown: Princess of Deadpool. A spin-off visual novel for Windows, named Guilty Crown: Lost Christmas, was also developed by Nitroplus, which came bundled with a 15-minute original video animation (OVA), also titled Guilty Crown: Lost Christmas.

== Synopsis ==
=== Setting ===
On December 24, 2029, a biological hazard known as the Apocalypse Virus (アポカリプスウイルス, Apokaripusu Uirusu) brought on by an impact event plunges Japan into a state of chaos. This event is later named the Lost Christmas incident (ロスト・クリスマス事件, Rosuto Kurisumasu Jiken). Unable to contain the threat, Japan sought international help and the United Nations dispatches an organization known as GHQ to their aid. GHQ ultimately contains the outbreak and restores a level of normality to the country at the cost of its independence and the oppression of its people. In 2039 (10 years later), a resistance organization known as the Funeral Parlor / Undertakers (葬儀社, Sōgisha) wages a campaign against GHQ to liberate Japan.

=== Plot ===
==== Part 1: Episode 1 - 12 ====
In the Roppongi district of Tokyo, high school student Shu Ouma encounters a wounded girl named Inori Yuzuriha, the vocalist of a popular internet group Egoist, taking refuge at his film club's workshop. Subsequently, members of the "Anti-Bodies", an elite GHQ unit tasked with containing the Apocalypse Virus by any means necessary, storm the workshop and arrest Inori for her involvement with a band of rebels called "Funeral Parlor".

After Inori's arrest, Shu follows the coordinates of Inori's robot to a drop zone where he meets Funeral Parlor's leader, Gai Tsutsugami, who asks him to safeguard a vial. As the Anti-Bodies begin attacking the Roppongi area in search of the vial, it shatters as Shu goes to rescue Inori when she becomes threatened by GHQ Endlave mechs. The vial contains the Void Genome, a powerful genetic weapon derived from the Apocalypse Virus that grants Shu the "Power of the King", an ability that allows his right hand to extract Voids, weapons of people's psyche given physical form. Shu then extracts Inori's Void and destroys the attacking Endlaves.

Upon deciding to join Funeral Parlor, Shu begins to fall in love with Inori, who bears a striking resemblance to his late sister, Mana. However, he deserts the group after killing a classmate's younger brother during one of his missions. In Shu's absence, Funeral Parlor attempt to steal from GHQ the meteorite that caused the Apocalypse Virus outbreak. In the process, Gai and his comrades fall into a trap as the Anti-Bodies ambush them with a "genetic resonance" broadcast that unleashes the Virus throughout Tokyo once again. Amidst the chaos, the Anti-Bodies' leader, Shūichirō Keido, seizes control of GHQ and orders all its forces to wipe out Funeral Parlor.

After learning his former comrades are in imminent danger of annihilation, Shu races to the center of Tokyo to rescue them. With the help of his classmates, he breaks through the barricade where they are being pinned down. Meanwhile, Inori begins to reverse the effects of the Virus through a resonance broadcast channeled by one of her songs. This sudden change in fortune proves only temporary when Yu, a mysterious boy possessing the "Power of the King", appears out of thin air and kidnaps Inori, causing the outbreak to resume with full force.

Shu finds Inori being held captive by Keido and Yu who are using her as a vessel for Mana's resurrection. They explain that Inori was created to provide a physical body for Mana's soul so she could give birth to a new human race once the existing population was destroyed by the Apocalypse Virus. Keido then proceeds to perform a "marriage" ritual intended to coerce Mana/Inori into accepting him as the father of her new progeny. Shu's repressed memories suddenly return, causing him to remember Mana was the first to be infected by the virus and how her mental breakdown resulted in the events of Lost Christmas. Shu also recalls from his past that Gai is none other than Triton, a childhood friend he first met ten years ago when Mana rescued him from the sea. With Gai's help, Shu frees Inori from Keido's grasp before stabbing the stasis pod containing Mana's dormant soul, seemingly killing her. Shu's actions save the world from the Virus, but Gai is killed in the process.

==== Part 2: Episode 13 - 22 ====
Two weeks later, Shūichirō Keido has GHQ seal off the area surrounding Roppongi, now called Loop 7, before proceeding to systematically eliminate the inhabitants within. A large number of teenagers take refuge at Tennouzu High School along with Funeral Parlor members Shu, Inori, Ayase and Tsugumi. With food and vaccine supplies running low, Shu is elected the new student council president. Despite initially aspiring to provide just governance to those under his charge, his leadership becomes cynical and despotic once he concludes his refusal to adopt the social Darwinist "Voids-Ranking system" resulted in the death of his close friend and love interest, Hare Menjou.

Following a fierce battle with GHQ, Shu and the others manage to break out of Loop 7. However, upon their escape, a resurrected Gai suddenly appears and severs Shu's right arm before transferring the Void Genome to himself. In order to insure Shu's escape, Inori single-handedly holds off GHQ's forces until they overwhelm and capture her. Shortly thereafter, Shu's stepmother, Haruka Ohma, betrays GHQ and steals the third Void Genome. Upon making contact with Haruka, Shu injects himself with the new Void Genome before once again assuming command of Funeral Parlor to rescue Inori and free Japan from GHQ's tyranny once and for all.

After Gai broadcasts a message to the world not to interfere with GHQ's actions in Japan, he proceeds to help Yu and Keido resurrect Mana in Inori's body. It is ultimately revealed that GHQ is serving as a front for Da'ath, an ancient cult seeking to forcefully bring about mankind's evolution with the Apocalypse Virus. As the virus begins spreading across the planet from Tokyo Tower, Funeral Parlor and its allies launch a massive offensive against Tokyo Bay in a desperate bid to save the world from annihilation.

In the series' climactic final battle, Shu manages to defeat Yu and Gai while Funeral Parlor destroys GHQ's forces. After being cornered at gunpoint by Haruka, Keido chooses to commit suicide rather than surrender. A dying Gai explains to Shu that he helped Da'ath so Mana could fulfill her cursed role as the Fourth Apocalypse's Eve. With her role completed, he says that Mana is finally able to rest in peace. Gai also admits his actions were wrong, and accepts the hatred of Shu and his comrades as a just punishment for his sins. He chooses to die with Mana as the Virus envelops them both.

Upon coming across a heavily infected Inori, Shu embraces her and activates his Void to absorb all traces of the Apocalypse Virus into himself. However, before he is consumed, Inori saves Shu by sacrificing her body to destroy the virus permanently. With the virus finally eradicated, the GHQ Tower collapses and everyone escapes. Some years later, a now blind Shu and the surviving members of Funeral Parlor celebrate Hare's birthday in a rebuilt Tokyo.

== Production ==
In the making of the series, the staff wanted to make "the next generation of anime with this show." For this they wanted it to be an original anime rather than an adaptation. The staff also wanted it to be a "two-season show" regardless of possible difficulties. The basic concept of the show is in a "Japanese style, a Japanese concept, and that is what makes it more original than other shows." When asked about similarities between Shu and Neon Genesis Evangelion's lead Shinji Ikari, the staff answered they are both passive characters although they found Shinji more passive.

When asked what circumstances led to his involvement, Redjuice responded that the production staff's illustrators and animators felt that his concept art exhibited a sense of compatibility with the final product. While Ryo of Supercell was providing the insert songs for the show, Redjuice himself was not participating in the project as a member of Supercell. Besides liking Inori, the main heroine of Guilty Crown, Redjuice stated that he had done many drawings of Tsugumi. The staff had no qualms with the catlike ears of Tsugumi so Redjuice feels that he has slipped his personal tastes into the series. Redjuice also likes Kanon although she was not originally written into the scenario. As Redjuice has not worked with 3D CG much, he was able to learn a lot from the staff at Production I.G.

=== Music ===
Guilty Crown Original Soundtrack

Soundtrack album by Hiroyuki Sawano
- Released: January 25, 2012
- Genre: Soundtrack
- Length: 75:50
- Label: Aniplex
- Producer: Hiroyuki Sawano

The music used in the Guilty Crown anime is composed by Hiroyuki Sawano. Both the opening and ending themes of Guilty Crown are written by Supercell. The first opening theme is titled "My Dearest" and is performed by Koeda. The CD single for "My Dearest" was released on November 23, 2011. The first ending theme is titled "Departures (Anata ni Okuru Ai no Uta)" (Departures ~あなたにおくるアイの歌~, Departures (Send your Love Song)) and is performed by Egoist, a fictional band from the series. The single for "Departures (Anata ni Okuru Ai no Uta)" was released on November 30, 2011. A 17-year-old artist named Chelly provided the vocals. Chelly was picked by Ryo of Supercell after an audition of 2,000 candidates. Chelly also sang the insert songs in Guilty Crown. The second opening theme is "The Everlasting Guilty Crown" by Egoist and the second ending theme is "Kokuhaku" (告白; "Confession") by Supercell.

All music is composed by Hiroyuki Sawano.

Guilty Crown Original Soundtrack
No.	Title	Lyrics	Vocals	Length
1.	"βίος" (Bios)	Rie	Mika Kobayashi	4:33
2.	"α" (alpha)			5:48
3.	"Ω" (Omega)			4:31
4.	"Ready to Go"	David Whitaker	David Whitaker	4:16
5.	"friends"	mpi	mpi	3:48
6.	"VOiD"			2:06
7.	"gエ19" (GHQ)			2:20
8.	"θεοι" (theoi)			3:38
9.	"close your eyes"	mpi	Michiyo Honda	3:51
10.	"Βασιλευζ" (Basileus)			4:17
11.	"π" (pi)			3:58
12.	"Release My Soul"	mpi	Aimee Blackschleger	4:34
13.	"κrOnё" (krone)			5:33
14.	"Hill Of Sorrow"	mpi	mpi	4:11
15.	"Αποκαλυψιζ" (Apokalypsis)			4:51
16.	"Home ～in this corner～"	mpi	Leina	3:48
17.	"Genesi§" (Genesis)			3:17
18.	"βιοζ-δ" (bios-delta)	Rie	Mika Kobayashi	2:35
19.	"Rё∀L" (Real)	Rie	Cyua	4:12
Total length:				75:50

== Release ==
Guilty Crown was directed by Tetsuro Araki with the series' script supervision being handled by Hiroyuki Yoshino and assisted by Ichirō Ōkouchi. Jin Hanegaya from Nitroplus will also be assisting with the screenplay. The mechanical designs were done by Atsushi Takeuchi and prop designs handled by Yō Moriyama. The original character designs were drawn by Redjuice, with Hiromi Katō providing the character designs for the anime. Yusuke Takeda was the anime's art director. The animation production was done by Production I.G's Division 6.

An Internet radio show named Guilty Crown Radio Council to promote Guilty Crown began airing every other Friday starting on October 7, 2011. The show is hosted by Yūki Kaji, the voice actor of Shu Ouma, and Ai Kayano, the voice actress of Inori Yuzuriha.

New York Anime Festival screened the first two episodes of Guilty Crown on October 15, 2011. The screening of the second episode was a world premiere as the episode did not air in Japan until October 20, 2011. At Anime Weekend Atlanta 2011, Funimation announced that it would simulcast the series in October, followed by a DVD and Blu-ray release in 2012. Guilty Crown was later available on Netflix.

== Related media ==
=== Print ===
A manga adaptation titled Guilty Crown, written by Yōsuke Miyagi and illustrated by Shion Mizuki, was serialized in Square Enix's Monthly Shōnen Gangan between the November 2011 and December 2013 issues. Square Enix released seven tankōbon volumes between January 21, 2012, and December 21, 2013. The manga adaptation is based first half anime with second half anime both some elements and storylines. A second manga titled Guilty Crown: Dancing Endlaves, written by Gan Sunaaku and illustrated by Ryōsuke Fukai, was serialized in ASCII Media Works' Dengeki G's Magazine between the July 2012 and May 2014 issues. Three volumes were released between January 26, 2013, and May 27, 2014.

A side story novel titled Guilty Crown: Princess of Deadpool was written by Gan Sunaaku from Nitroplus, with illustrations done by a Production I.G and Nitroplus collaboration. A special version that came along with a special book cover was first sold at Anime Contents Expo 2012 in between March 31 and April 1, while the official release was on April 25. The first chapter was put up for public reading.

=== Visual novel ===
Nitroplus developed a spin-off visual novel for Windows, named Guilty Crown: Lost Christmas (ギルティクラウン ロストクリスマス, Giruti Kuraun Rosuto Kurisumasu). The visual novel was previously known as Lost X. The scenario writer for this game is Jin Hanegaya, who also penned Demonbane. The game focuses on the "Lost Christmas" incident. The full version of the game includes a short 10-minute anime.

== Reception ==
The series received mixed critical reaction. Carl Kimlinger from Anime News Network commended the series' bravery on reinventing its plot but described the plot as jumbled and continued the trend of weak characters and clichés. Aiden Foote of THEM Anime Reviews agreed with Kimlinger on the presentation and plot and added that the characters are unsympathetic with back stories that do not add depth to them. On the other hand, Foote remarks the aesthetics and the musical appeal, stating that "Guilty Crown is its own jewel in terms of music, visual flare and design from the characters to the setting, to the set pieces." Chris Beveridge from The Fandom Post commented "While it goes big and throws a lot at us, the end result that defines the rest of the season is one that works fantastically well for me because it introduces radical change into the series." He praised Shu's character development as well as the setting chosen for its second half.

DVD Talk's Kyle Mills gave the series more praise, noting that despite small criticism "the 1st 11 episodes of the series are great." He praised the story and setting but criticized the development of certain characters comparing them to "flaws" Gurren Lagann made. UK Anime Network commented on the series' second half that the series "bites off more than it can chew, and at times the fervent mastication that comes from this leaves certain aspects of its narrative as something of a sloppy mess, but there's still an interesting story being told here and much of it is delivered in an enjoyable fashion thanks to a superb soundtrack, slick action set pieces, and some strong ideas that make good use of the show's cast of characters." Despite criticism, Andy Hanley of UK Anime Network praised the animation as "visually eye-catching."
