= Lala Hsu discography =

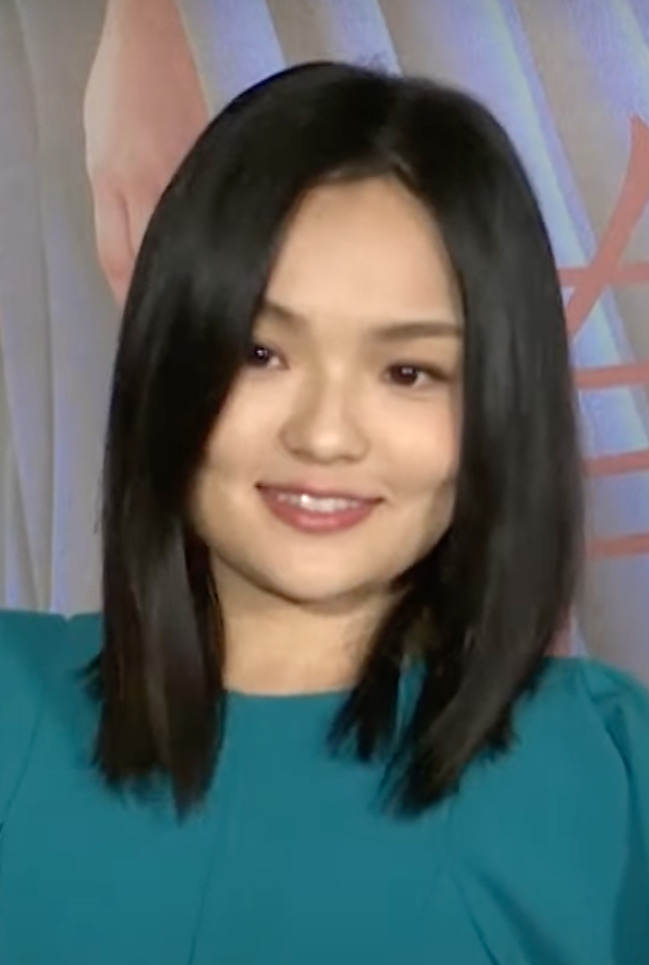
- Hsu in 2023
- Studio albums: 6
- EPs: 4
- Live albums: 4

The discography of Taiwanese singer Lala Hsu consists of six studio albums, four extended plays, and four live albums.

== Studio albums ==
Title	Details	Peak chart positions
Title	Details	TWN
Lala Hsu (LaLa首張創作專輯)	Released: 29 May 2009; Label: AsiaMuse; Formats: CD, Digital download	4
Limits (極限)	Released: 3 September 2010; Label: AsiaMuse; Formats: CD, Digital download	—
Ideal Life (理想人生)	Released: 6 June 2012; Label: AsiaMuse; Formats: CD, Digital download	9
Missing (尋人啟事)	Released: 13 June 2014; Label: AsiaMuse; Formats: CD, Digital download	5
The Inner Me (心裡學)	Released: 27 December 2017; Label: AsiaMuse; Formats: CD, Digital download	—
Gei (給)	Released: 22 June 2022; Label: AsiaMuse; Formats: CD, Digital download	—

== Extended plays ==
Title	Details
Lala Was a Student – One (「徐佳莹的学生时代」ONE)	Released: 28 September 2019; Label: CS Music; Format: Digital download
Lala Was a Student – Two (「徐佳莹的学生时代」TWO)	Released: 12 October 2019; Label: CS Music; Format: Digital download
Lala Was a Student – Three (「徐佳莹的学生时代」THREE)	Released: 18 October 2019; Label: CS Music; Format: Digital download
Lala Was a Student – Four (「徐佳莹的学生时代」FOUR)	Released: 25 October 2019; Label: CS Music; Format: Digital download

== Live albums ==
Title	Details
On the Way to the Ideal Life (繼續·理想人生)	Released: 16 April 2013; Label: AsiaMuse; Formats: CD, Digital download
Total Eclipse (日全蝕)	Released: 13 May 2016; Label: AsiaMuse; Formats: CD, Digital download
I Am a Singer 4 (收•音)	Released: 22 September 2016; Label: AsiaMuse; Format: Digital download
You Made My Day (是日救星)	Released: 6 December 2019; Label: AsiaMuse; Formats: DVD, Blu-ray, Digital download

== Singles ==
Title	Year	Peak chart positions	Album
Title	Year	CHN	Album
"Song of Airport – On the Road" (在旅行的路上 機場之歌)	2013	—	Non-album single
"One Minute More" (只要一分鐘)	2014	—	Missing
"The Rain is Coming" (大雨將至)	2014	—	The Imperial Doctress OST
"Suddenly Missing You" (突然好想你)	2015	—	Herstory with Mayday
"Little Princess" (小公主)	2016	—	Total Eclipse
"You Made My Day" (是日救星)	2016	—	The Inner Me
"What I Learned from Mom" (媽媽教會我)	2019	—	Non-album single
"Prototype" (雛形)	2021	7	Gei
"None of the Above" (以上皆非)	2021	—	Gei
"Drowned Man" (行走的鱼)	2022	16	Cross Over
"—" denotes releases that did not chart or were not released in that region.

=== Promotional singles ===
Title	Year	Album
"Disco" (迪斯可)	2010	Limits
"Oasis" (綠洲)	2010	Limits
"Dare to Celebrate" (不怕慶祝)	2012	Ideal Life
"Steady" (明天的事情)	2014	Missing
"Gone with the Wind" (耳邊風)	2014	Missing
"Combat" (格斗场)	2016	Non-album release
"Perfect Landing" (完美落地)	2017	Non-album release
"Ten Years of Us" (我们的十年)	2018	Non-album release

== Soundtrack appearances ==
Title	Year	Peak chart positions	Album
Title	Year	CHN	Album
"Jianghu" (江湖)	2008	—	Jianghu.com OST
"Palette" (調色盤)	2012	—	Touch of the Light OST
"Cuckoo" (布穀)	2012	—	The Girl Who Swims Breaststroke OST
"Rolling! My Baby" (翻滾吧！我的寶貝)	2012	—	The Girl Who Swims Breaststroke OST
"One Minute More" (只要一分鐘)	2014	—	One Minute More OST
"The Rain is Coming" (大雨将至)	2016	—	The Imperial Doctress OST
"Oblivion" (遗忘之前)	2016	—	The Imperial Doctress OST
"You Only Live Once" (潇洒走一回)	2016	—	New York New York OST
"Blossom" (女人花)	2016	—	MBA Partners OST
"All I Need" (我所需要的)	2016	—	My Fair Lady OST
"It's Cold Without Your Love" (湫兮如风)	2016	—	Big Fish & Begonia OST
"Never Alone" (不要再孤单)	2016	—	Love O2O OST
"Finding You" (当我找到了你)	2016	—	Suddenly Seventeen OST
"My First Memory" (最初的记忆)	2017	—	Rush to the Dead Summer OST
"Shining with Love" (因爱闪光)	2017	—	Our Shining Days OST
"A Love is Hard to Wish for" (一爱难求)	2018	—	Legend of Fuyao OST
"The River" (一江水)	2018	—	Eagles and Youngster OST
"Beautiful Encounter" (最美的遇见)	2018	—	All Out of Love OST
"Really Stupid" (真的傻)	2019	—	Fall in Love at First Kiss OST
"One Sentence of the Universe" (一句话的宇宙)	2019	—	The Sound 2 OST
"Missing" (寻人启事)	2019	—	If I Can Love You So OST
"Angel Love Elephant" (天使愛大象)	2019	—	Triad Princess OST
"I Will Always Be Here" (我一直都在这里)	2020	—	Boonie Bears: The Wild Life OST
"Time Knows Love" (在你不知道的时间里爱你很久)	2020	—	Love You Forever OST
"Get the Sun" (得到太阳)	2020	72	Run for Young OST
"Twisted Fate of Love" (今夕何夕)	2020	99	Twisted Fate of Love OST
"Colorless Flower" (沒顏色的花)	2020	—	Miss Andy OST
"Reluctantly" (不舍)	2020	5	Douluo Continent OST
"You Have Me" (你有我)	2021	—	Hand in Hand OST
"The Farthest Distance" (最远的远方)	2021	—	Never Say Goodbye OST
"Ask Kalpa" (問劫)	2021	—	Kalpa of Universe OST
"The Time Monologue" (光阴独白)	2021	42	You Are My Glory OST
"Far Away from You" (远距离练习)	2022	—	Stay with Me OST
"—" denotes releases that did not chart or were not released in that region.

== Collaborations ==
Title	Year	Album
"If You Think" (自以為) (feat. Khalil Fong)	2011	15
"Under the Willow" (柳樹下) (feat. R. Chord)	2011	Growing Up
"Shhh……" (噓……) (feat. Soft Lipa)	2011	By Bicycle
"Break-up Night" (分手夜) (feat. Lie Gramophone)	2012	Future Primitive
"Flaming Beacon" (烽火) (feat. Europa Huang and William Wei)	2014	Non-album single
"Always in Love" (feat. Amber Kuo and Apay)	2015	Begin Again
"To See Love" (看见爱) (feat. Various Artists)	2016	Non-album single
"Yuan Zou Gao Fei" (远走高飞) (feat. Kim Ji-mun)	2017	Hello 1
"Catfight" (傲嬌) (feat. A-mei and Eve Ai)	2017	Story Thief
"The River" (一江水) (feat. Mao Buyi)	2018	Eagles and Youngster OST
"Make Friends Now" (現在開始做朋友) (feat. Various Artists)	2019	Non-album single
"Unsure" (一無所知) (feat. Chen Linong)	2020	Antipathetic
"Is It the Best You Can Do" (进化) (feat. Hush)	2020	Imperfect Imperfections
"Begin Again" (尽管如此，还是) (feat. A Si)	2021	So What!

== Songwriting credits ==
Year	Album	Artist	Song	Lyrics		Music	
Year	Album	Artist	Song	Credited	With	Credited	With
2010	Second Home	Kay Tse	"Second Home"	No	—	Yes	—
2010	Loneliness is Not the Hardest Part	A-Lin	"Whether Happiness Comes or Not"	No	—	Yes	—
2011	Non-album single	Lala Hsu	"Starting Point"	Yes	—	Yes	—
2011	Longing for...	Rainie Yang	"Fast Forward"	No	—	Yes	—
2011	Another She	Claire Kuo	"Originally"	Yes	—	Yes	—
2011	Non-album single	Lala Hsu	"Our Talk Show"	Yes	—	Yes	—
2011	Hi! Jing Wen	Jing Wen Tseng	"Ex-Boyfriend"	Yes	David Ko	Yes	—
2011	Black Apple	Bibi Zhou	"Singlism"	No	—	Yes	—
2012	Home Girl	Sharon Kwan	"Rainy Days"	No	—	Yes	—
2012	Die Sterntaler OST	Jing Wen Tseng	"Pointed Forward"	No	—	Yes	—
2012	If You Luv Me	Eve Ai	"Critical Moment"	No	—	Yes	—
2012	Love or Not	Cyndi Wang	"Become Strangers"	No	—	Yes	—
2012	Keep Loving	Claire Kuo	"Love to Say Du Du"	No	—	Yes	—
2013	Prima Donna OST	Chien Chih-cheng	"Prima Donna"	No	—	Yes	—
2013	For the Loved	Rene Liu	"My Enemy"	Yes	David Ko	Yes	—
2013	Don't Cry	Issac Dang	"Consolation"	Yes	—	Yes	—
2013	In Front of You	Jin Chi	"Lovelorn Party"	No	—	Yes	—
2013	Zero	Naiwen Yang	"What Am I"	Yes	Naiwen Yang	Yes	—
2013	Alone the Way	Jia Jia	"Not Equal"	No	—	Yes	—
2014	Girls	Shi Shi	"Live with You"	No	—	Yes	—
2014	Until We Meet	Claire Kuo	"Part-Time Lover"	No	—	Yes	—
2014	Until We Meet	Claire Kuo	"Whatever"	No	—	Yes	—
2014	With You	Amber An	"New Home"	No	—	Yes	—
2014	A Tale of Two Rainie	Rainie Yang	"Ripples"	Yes	—	Yes	—
2015	This is Me	Xuan Xuan	"Fortunately Love is Not So Deep"	No	—	Yes	—
2015	Darling	Julia Peng	"Shut Up"	Yes	—	Yes	—
2015	When Everything Around was Empty	Liu Xijun	"Even Now"	No	—	Yes	—
2016	Fanfan's Time to Give Thanks	Christine Fan	"Coincide"	No	—	Yes	—
2016	The One I'm Waiting For	Chen Bing	"The One I'm Waiting For"	No	—	Yes	—
2016	Non-album singles	Lala Hsu	"All I Need"	Yes	—	Yes	—
2016	Non-album singles	Meng Huiyuan	"We People"	No	—	Yes	—
2016	Morning Bound for Midnight	Diamond Zhang	"Half and Half"	No	—	Yes	—
2017	Story Thief	A-mei	"Catflight"	No	—	Yes	—
2018	About Jess	Jess Lee	"The Same"	No	—	Yes	—
2018	Freyja	Valen Hsu	"Springtime Allergies"	No	—	Yes	—
2018	#Unlovely	Summer Meng	"I'm Unlovely"	No	—	Yes	—
2019	Confession	Pets Tseng	"Confession"	No	—	Yes	—
2019	Ten	Liu Yuning	"Empathy"	Yes	—	Yes	—
2019	Non-album single	Vickeblanka	"The Last Mile"	Yes	—	No	—
2019	The More Beautiful, The More Invisible	Naiwen Yang	"LaDiDa"	No	—	Yes	—
2019	Delete, Reset, Grow	Rainie Yang	"Fearless Love"	Yes	—	Yes	—
2020	29	Lulu Huang	"Pure"	No	—	Yes	—
2020	More	Zhang Zining	"The Lovely Bones"	Yes	—	Yes	—
2020	Non-album single	A-mei	"Huan Huan"	No	—	Yes	—
2021	Each Well	Rene Liu	"Aside"	No	—	Yes	—
2021	Delusions	Julia Peng	"In Vino Veritas"	No	—	Yes	—
2021	Non-album singles	Wayne Huang	"Still Alone"	Yes	David Ko	Yes	—
2022	Non-album singles	Christine Fan	"Solitary Moment"	No	—	Yes	—
