= Wonderland (Khalil Fong album) =

2007 studio album by Khalil Fong

Studio album 未來 by Khalil Fong
- Released: 28 December 2007 (Hong Kong, Taiwan); March 2008 (Mainland China); 29 March 2008 (Second edition)
- Recorded: 2007
- Genre: Mandopop, R&B, Soul
- Language: Mandarin
- Label: Warner Music Hong Kong
- Producer: Khalil Fong, Edward Chan, Charles Lee

Khalil Fong chronology
This Love (2006)	Wonderland (2007)	Orange Moon (2008)

Singles from Soulboy
- 1. "Love Song" Released: 26 December 2007

Wonderland (traditional Chinese: 未來; simplified Chinese: 未来; lit. 'Future') is Hong Kong Mandopop artist Khalil Fong's third Mandarin album. It was released on 28 December 2007 by Warner Music Hong Kong and also is Fong's first album released in Taiwan. The album's first hit song "Love Song" received a lot of review and awards in Hong Kong and Taiwan. Due to many sales of this album, Warner Records released CD plus DVD second edition version, which included music videos of "Love Song", the second hit song "Sorry", the third hit song "How It Feels" (够不够) and four live performances at The wall live music house (這牆音樂藝文展演空間) in Taiwan.

== Background ==
The album Wonderland carries Fong's hopeful for the world and his dream for music career. Although Fong has just shortly after his young debuted, these works are deeply influenced by American Motown dance, soul and R&B in the 1960s and 1970s. He released albums in Hong Kong, but he insisted on only singing Mandarin songs. Fong started with the first innovative attempt album Soulboy in 2005, released his previous album This Love in 2006, and finally officially entered the Taiwanese mandarin music scene market at the end of 2007 with his new album. Fong's previous album This Love mainly describes different types of love, and does not focus much on the love between men and women. Therefore, under the flurry of requests from all walks of life in this album specially wrote this "Love Song" as the first wave of hit song to describe the love between men and women.

== Promotion ==
Record label Warner Music Hong Kong specially chose to radio broadcast "Love Song" on major radio stations nationwide on 14 February 2008 as a special music theme for Valentine's Day in mainland China, Hong Kong and Taiwan, bringing listeners into love theme.

== Composition ==
Wonderland continues Fong's independent creative working style and his usual musical style, and he has also made many attempts on this basis. At the same time, the love songs in this album are full of magic.

The first hit "Love Song" is a slow rhythm and R&B type sentimental ballad, song lyrics that highlights the expression of affection for a loved one in light, straightforward terms, a song that fits well with people's ideas of love, and is direct, honest, and simple, the part of the last 3:00–3:35 music bridge is very attractive. Arrangement and composed are used from the piano, guitar, percussion and sring concerto, to the behind the music human voice harmony, what comes out of the multiple elements is a romance that appears to be sincere.

The song "Warm" (暖) with lyrics by Chow Yiu Fai and it's a featured environmentally conscious love song, from the lyrics of "The butterflies are getting crazy" (蝴蝶越来越狂), "I'm afraid I'll never be able to watch the snowflakes together again" (我怕再不可以一起看雪花) and "As winter turns to summer, there are always things on my mind that I can't let go of, Is the intimacy melting away?" (冬变夏总有心事放不下,有没有亲密在融化?) depicting the story of a love affair that is no longer romantic when the temperature of raise warm the whole global world and climate change.

== Title and art work ==
The theme of the album was "Love and Environmental Protection". In the album cover of Wonderland, Fong was wearing big black glasses and a blue patent leather jacket, eyes bright and far-reaching.The design of the whole album with blue as the main color is not entirely based on the fashion trend as the basis of design consideration, but from the environmental protection theme as a consideration. Most of the earth's surface area is occupied by the ocean, so the earth seen in the universe is a planet covered by blue, and therefore blue has become another synonym for the earth. In addition to this, in Hong Kong and Taiwan, the version of "Wonderland" was released slightly differently compared to the mainland china, but the theme of environmental protection was more distinctive and prominent. The difference between the Hong Kong and Taiwan released of "Wonderland" and the mainland released is that although the design is still blue and features a close-up of Fong's head, the difference is that there are two small holes on both sides of Fong's ears. The album was released at the beginning of the year and many people were puzzled and question by it and feeling that it was very abrupt and did not understand the deep meaning, which also attracted suspicion from all sides. In fact, this is exactly the ingenious design of the album cover. The optical disc surface blue and white is the earth's ozone layer of realistic embodiment, from the overall view, two small holes through the ozone layer is the location of the earth's ozone hole is located in the position, is intended to alert people, facing a variety of environmental problems on earth biological survival is being increasingly threatened, environmental protection is the people's survival and development of the most fundamental and most important.In the end, when introducing the mainland china version, this design of two holes idea was removed, Fong said that although the highlight of this design concept is gone, but it didn't affected the promotion of the theme.

== Release and reception ==
This album was first released on 28 December 2007 in Hong Kong and Taiwan and in March 2008 in mainland China. Each time his music work released, he redefined the Chinese music scene by introducing his combination of rhythm and blues, soul music and mandarin pop songs and also indicate his official entry into the mature stage of Chinese pop music. The song "Love Song" and album Wonderland make him award many Chinese mandarin music chart accolade in 2008.

== Track listing ==
All arrangement and songwriting is Khalil Fong.All producers are Khalil Fong, Edward Chan and Charles Lee.

No	Name	Songwriting	Lyrics
01	Love Song	Khalil Fong	Khalil Fong
02	How It Feels (夠不夠)	Khalil Fong	Khalil Fong, Liang Rulan
03	Warm (暖)	Khalil Fong	Chow Yiu Fai
04	Love At (愛在)	Khalil Fong	Chow Yiu Fai
05	Park (公園)	Khalil Fong	Khalil Fong
06	Sweety Pie (簡單最浪漫)	Khalil Fong	FAMA
07	Countdown (十九八七)	Khalil Fong	Chow Yiu Fai
08	Wonderland (未來)	Khalil Fong	FAMA
09	Beautiful (忘了美麗)	Khalil Fong	Khalil Fong
10	Sorry	Khalil Fong	Chen Yuzhen
11	This Love (Acoustic Version) (The original version was included in the previous album This Love)	Khalil Fong	Chow Yiu Fai

== Music video ==
The song "Love Song" music video was director by Bill Chia (比爾賈) and released on 26 December 2007 by warner company."Love Song" on Warner Music Hong Kong on YouTube

- "Sorry" Director: Lu Laihui (呂來慧)"Sorry" on Warner Music Hong Kong on YouTube
- "How it Feels" (够不够) Director: Dabao Dao (大寶導)"How it Feels" on Warner Music Hong Kong on YouTube

== Accolades ==
On 1 January 2009, the Commercial Radio Hong Kong's Ultimate Song Chart Awards Presentation was held in AsiaWorld–Expo and Fong won the Male Singer Gold Award, Singer-Songwriter Gold Award and Composer Award.

Awards and nominations for Wonderland and the song work
Year	Award	Category	Mentioned	Result	Ref
2008
2008	19th Golden Melody Awards	Golden Melody Award for Best Male Mandarin Singer	Khalil Fong	Nominated	
2008	19th Golden Melody Awards	Golden Melody Award for Song of the Year	"Love Song"	Nominated	
2008	8th Global Chinese Music Awards	Top Twenty Hits	"Love Song"	Won	
