= This Love (album) =

2006 studio album by Khalil Fong

- This Love cover

Studio album 愛愛愛 by Khalil Fong
- Released: 29 December 2006
- Genre: Mandopop, soul, R&B, jazz
- Length: 45:22
- Language: Mandarin
- Label: Warner Music Hong Kong
- Producer: Edward Chan, Khalil Fong, Charles Lee

Khalil Fong chronology
Soulboy (2005)	This Love (2006)	Wonderland (2007)

This Love (traditional Chinese: 愛愛愛; simplified Chinese: 爱爱爱; lit. 'Love Love Love') is Hong Kong Mandopop artist Khalil Fong's second Mandarin album. It was released on 29 December 2006 by Warner Music Hong Kong. The theme of the album was "different types of love". "Four Tour" is a duet with Fiona Sit. "If You Leave Me Now" is a cover of rock band Chicago's 1976 hit ballad "If You Leave Me Now". On 1 March 2007, a special edition with DVD, which includes music videos of "Four Tour", "This Love" and "Lady Sue", and also "Spring Breeze", "Sound of the South" and "Little Sister" from Fong's debut album Soulboy.

== Accolades ==
The album was awarded one of the Top 10 Selling Mandarin Albums of the Year at the 2007 IFPI Hong Kong Album Sales Awards, presented by the Hong Kong branch of IFPI and award the New Powers of Creation, Popular Mandarin Song in Song work "This Love" and Mandarin Excellent Album in This Love at the 2007 Metro Radio Mandarin Hits Music Awards., the Popular Mandarin Song in "This Love" at 2006 Metro Radio Music Awards.

== Track listing ==
All arrangement is Khalil Fong.

No.	Title	Melody	Lyrics
01	This Love (愛愛愛)	Khalil Fong	Chow Yiu Fai
02	Lady Sue (蘇麗珍) (also:Su Lizhen)	Khalil Fong	Chow Yiu Fai
03	Singer And Model (歌手與模特兒)	Khalil Fong	Albert Leung
04	Ai! (唉!)	Khalil Fong	FAMA
05	Four Tour (四人遊) feat. Fiona Sit	Khalil Fong	Albert Leung
06	Hand in Hand (手拖手)	Khalil Fong	Khalil Fong, Liang Ru Lan
07	Snicker 偷笑 (also:Laugh in Secret)	Khalil Fong	Khalil Fong
08	Goodbye Melody Rose	Khalil Fong	Chow Yiu Fai
09	The Poet's Lover (詩人的情人)	Khalil Fong	Albert Leung
10	Drag a man and a woman (拖男帶女)	Khalil Fong	Khalil Fong, Liang Ru Lan
11	Love Interlude	Khalil Fong	N/A
12	If You Leave Me Now (Bonus Track)	Peter Cetera	Peter Cetera
13	Spring Breeze Mix (Bonus Track) (春風吹之吹吹風Remix)	Khalil Fong	Chow Yiu Fai
