= Wind music =

Wind music may refer to:

- Music written for wind instruments
- Music produced using the wind (rather than, say, breath) with chiefly string instruments, such as the Aeolian harp, but some woodwinds are also known
- Wind Music (record label), a Taiwanese music company
