= Timeless (Khalil Fong album) =

2009 cover album by Khalil Fong

Studio album 可啦思刻 by Khalil Fong
- Released: 11 August 2009
- Genres: Mandopop, Acoustic, R&B, Soul-Jazz, Ballad
- Languages: English, Mandarin
- Label: Warner Music Hong Kong

Khalil Fong chronology
Orange Moon (2008)	Timeless (2009)	15 (2011)

Timeless (Chinese: 可啦思刻) is Hong Kong Mandopop artist Khalil Fong's cover album. It was released on 11 August 2009 by Warner Music Hong Kong.

In Timeless, Khalil selected 10 classic songs to cover, including Stevie Wonder's "You Are the Sunshine of My Life", Glenn Medeiros's Nothing's Gonna Change My Love for You, Michael Jackson's "Bad", Ray Charles's "Georgia on My Mind" and Eric Clapton's "Wonderful Tonight". Apart from English songs, he covered the Mandarin classics like Faye Wong's "Red Bean" and A-mei's "Remember". He also recorded and released his first Cantonese song "Kuang Chao" (lit.Violent Tides) (originally sung by Susanna Kwan).

== Track listing ==
No.	Title	Covered artist	Length
01	You Are The Sunshine Of My Life (featuring黃韻玲)	Stevie Wonder	3:03
02	Nothing's Gonna Change My Love For You	Glenn Medeiros	3:29
03	Bad	Michael Jackson	3:31
04	Kuang Chao (狂潮)	Susanna Kwan	
05	La Bamba	Ritchie Valens	5:02
06	Red Bean (紅豆)	Faye Wong	3:56
07	Georgia On My Mind	Ray Charles	3:45
08	Remember (記得)	A-mei	3:46
09	Wonderful Tonight	Eric Clapton	3:44
10	Moon River	Audrey Hepburn	3:05

== Award ==
Year	Award	Category	Nominator	Work	Result
2010
2010	21st Golden Melody Awards	Golden Melody Award for Best Male Mandarin Singer	Khalil Fong	Timeless	Nominated
