= 26th Golden Melody Awards =

Taiwanese music award ceremony in 2015

- Date: June 27, 2015 (Popular)
- Location: Taipei Arena, Taipei, Taiwan (Popular)
- Hosted by: Harlem Yu (Popular)

Television/radio coverage
- Network: TTV

The 26th Golden Melody Awards (Chinese: 第26屆金曲獎) ceremony for popular music category was held on June 27, 2015. The TTV network broadcast the show live from the Taipei Arena in Taipei, Taiwan. The ceremony recognized the best recordings, compositions, and artists of the eligibility year, which runs from January 1, 2014 to December 31, 2014.

== Winners and nominees ==
Winners are highlighted in boldface.

=== Vocal category – Record label awards ===
==== Song of the Year ====
- **"Island's Sunrise (Original Version Re-mixed)" (from Island's Sunrise) – Fire EX.**
  - "Missing" (from Missing) – Lala Hsu
  - "The Rest of Time" (from Wake Up Dreaming) – Jacky Cheung
  - "Faces of Paranoia" (from Faces of Paranoia) – aMEI, Soft Lipa
  - "Play" (from Play) – Jolin Tsai

==== Best Mandarin Album ====
- **Play – Jolin Tsai**
  - Missing – Lala Hsu
  - Wake Up Dreaming – Jacky Cheung
  - Rice & Shine – Eason Chan
  - Aiyo, Not Bad – Jay Chou
  - Departures – Karen Mok

==== Best Hokkien Album ====
- **The Most Beautiful Flower – Ricky Hsiao**
  - Timeless Sentence – Chthonic
  - The Tenth Album – New Formosa Band
  - Ye Shou – Hsieh Ming-yu
  - Polaris – Chan Ya-wen

==== Best Hakka Album ====
- **The Songs of Mountain Are All on the One Road – Ayugo Huang**
  - Daylight – Huang Wei-jie
  - Curving Roads – Huang Pei-shu
  - On the Road – Misa
  - Moments of Love – Sinco Chiu

==== Best Aboriginal Album ====
- **Polynesia – Chalaw Pasiwali**
  - Hosa – Hosa
  - Wild Boxing – Boxing
  - Ocean, Forest – Suming
  - Ima Lalu Su – Inka Mbing & Her Young Atayal Friends

==== Best Music Video ====
- **Shockley Huang – "Nebulous" (from You Lovely Bastard)**
  - Li Bo-en – "Selfie Addict" (from XXXIII)
  - Muh Chen – "Play" (from Play)
  - Hou Chi-jan – "We're All Different, Yet the Same" (from Play)
  - Teng Yung-shing, Xi Ran – "In a Flash" (from In a Flash)

=== Vocal category – Individual awards ===
==== Best Composition ====
- **William Wei – "Wolves" (from Journey Into The Night)**
  - Europa Huang – "Missing" (from Missing)
  - Li Ronghao – "King of Comedy" (from Li Ronghao)
  - JJ Lin – "Listen Up" (from Rice & Shine)
  - Chang Shilei – "Departures" (from Departures)

==== Best Lyrics ====
- **Francis Lee – "Departures" (from Departures)**
  - Hush – "Missing" (from Missing)
  - Wyman Wong – "King of Comedy" (from Li Ronghao)
  - Lin Xi – "Listen Up" (from Rice & Shine)
  - Lin Xi – "It's All Good" (from Departures)

==== Best Music Arrangement ====
- **Buddha Jump – "Let You See" (from Let You See)**
  - Chen Chien-chi – "Missing" (from Missing)
  - Lawrence Ku – "Touching Hearts" (from To the Top)
  - Pessi Levanto – "Forgotten Times" (from Midnight Cinema)
  - Starr Chen, Nese Ni – "Play" (from Play)

==== Producer of the Year, Album ====
- **Arai Soichiro – Departures**
  - Ayugo Huang – **The Songs of Mountain Are All on the One Road**
  - Joanna Wang, Pessi Levanto – Midnight Cinema
  - Chen Chien-chi – You Lovely Bastard
  - Jay Chou – Aiyo, Not Bad

==== Producer of the Year, Single ====
- **Xiao An – "Lip Reading" (from Play)**
  - JJ Lin – "Listen Up" (from Rice & Shine)
  - Stefanie Sun – "Kepler" (from Kepler)
  - Xiao An – "Sophisticated Game" (from Grown Love)
  - Starr Chen – "Play" (from Play)

==== Best Mandarin Male Singer ====
- **Eason Chan – Rice & Shine''**
  - Jacky Cheung – Wake Up Dreaming
  - Khalil Fong – Dangerous World
  - William Wei – Journey Into the Night
  - Roger Yang – Beast in the Dark

==== Best Mandarin Female Singer ====
- **aMEI – Faces of Paranoia''**
  - Lala Hsu – Missing
  - Waa Wei – You Lovely Bastard
  - Karen Mok – Departures
  - A-Lin – Guilt

==== Best Taiwanese Male Singer ====
- **Hsiao Huang-chi – The Most Beautiful Flower''**
  - Daniel Luo – Hero
  - Henry Hsu – An Inch of True Heart
  - Hsieh Ming-yu – Ye Shou
  - Michael Shih – Kui-Cho Hai-Liau-Liau

==== Best Taiwanese Female Singer ====
- **Angie Lee – Breeze, City''**
  - Tseng Hsin-mei – Rainwater
  - Ara Guo – Women's Courage
  - Chan Ya-wen – Polaris
  - Sun Shu-may – Love Me Forever If You Dare

==== Best Hakka Singer ====
- **Ayugo Huang – The Songs of Mountain Are All on the One Road**
  - Huang Wei-jie – Daylight
  - Huang Pei-shu – Curving Roads
  - Misa – On the Road
  - Sinco Chiu – Moments of Love

==== Best Aboriginal Singer ====
- **Chalaw Garu – Polynesian''**
  - Boxing – Wild Boxing
  - Suming – Sea, Forest

==== Best Band ====
- **Buddha Jump – Let You See''**
  - Chthonic – Timeless Sentence
  - Trash – Start from Zero
  - The Chairman – One World
  - Boxing – Boxing
  - Magic Power – Fighting for Love

==== Best Group ====
- **Murmurshow – Murmurshow**
  - New Formosa Band – The Tenth Album
  - MJ116 – Fresh Game
  - PiA – Ain't Life a Surprise
  - Gentleman – Imperfect Gentleman

==== Best New Artist ====
- **Boxing – Boxing**
  - Shi Shi – Girls
  - Adrian Fu – Good Morning, Hard City
  - Chen Hui-ting – 21 Grams
  - Wang Hui-chu – A Voyage of Vera

=== Instrumental category – Record label awards ===
==== Best Instrumental Album ====
- **The Flow – Eiji Kadota**
  - Interestring Quartet – Interestring Quartet
  - Homeland – Vincent Hsu
  - The Rest of Life - Seediq Bale – Purdur

=== Instrumental category – Individual awards ===
==== Producer of the Year, Instrumental ====
- **Daniel Ho** – **Our World in Song - An Odyssey of Musical Treasures**
  - Yu Chia-lun, Huang Wei-Jun – Interestring Quartet
  - Eiji Kadota, Michael Ning – The Flow
  - Vincent Hsu – Homeland
  - Peng Fei – 3rd Month

==== Best Instrumental Composition ====
- **Peng Fei** – **"Night Cats" (from 3rd Month)**
  - Huang Wei-Jun – "Let's Play" (from Interestring Quartet)
  - Eiji Kadota – "Dolphin Island" (from The Flow)
  - Vincent Hsu – "A New One" (from Homeland)
  - Purdur – "The Rest of Life" (from The Rest of Life - Seediq Bale)

=== Technical category – Individual awards ===
==== Best Album Design ====
- **Aaron Nieh – Enchantment**
  - Joe Fang – Faces of Paranoia
  - Lo Wen-tsen, Tsai An-teng, Wu Chih-yin – Faces of Paranoia
  - Howza Hsu – Sweet Home Ka-Aluwan
  - Aaron Nieh – Play
  - Lee Chung-chiang – Aiyo, Not Bad (USB version)

=== Technical category – Record label awards ===
==== Best Vocal Recording Album ====
- **Play** **– Jolin Tsai**
  - Midnight Cinema – Joanna Wang
  - Dangerous World – Khalil Fong
  - Departures – Karen Mok
  - Polynesia – Chalaw Pasiwali

==== Best Instrumental Recording Album ====
- **Led by the Sea Breeze** **– Rich Huang**
  - Interestring Quartet – Interestring Quartet
  - Stranger – Chen Jo-yu
  - Music Non-Stop – Lee Shih-yang, Sabu Toyozumi

=== Lifetime Contribution Award ===
- **Chen Yang**
- **Jody Chiang**
