= Grown Love =

Grown Love 大人情歌

Studio album by Eve Ai
- Released: October 16, 2014
- Genre: Mandopop
- Length: 42:40
- Label: Sony Music Taiwan

Eve Ai chronology
If You Luv Me (2012)	Grown Love 大人情歌 (2014)	Talk About Eve (2016)

Grown Love (Chinese: 大人情歌) is the second studio album released by the Taiwanese singer-songwriter, Eve Ai. It was released on 16 October 2014.

== Track listing ==
Standard edition
No.	Title	Writer(s)	Length
1.	"Sophisticated Games"	Eve Ai	4:53
2.	"I Don't Know What Love Is"	Ai; Guisheng Jin	4:55
3.	"Never Be The Same"	Jessica Mauboy; Anthony Egizii; David Musumeci; Chih Chung Tsai	3:50
4.	"Truth"	Justin Cho; Luke Tsui	4:19
5.	"If Now"	Jopo Chou; Cho	3:53
6.	"Grown Love (ft.Guisheng Jin)"	Jin; Ai	3:40
7.	"Sway"	Hui-Jun Lin; Ji-Mei Lin	4:14
8.	"Bad"	Showan; Jin-Xing Liang	2:47
9.	"Hello"	Evan Yo; Ai	3:10
10.	"Why Am I Born If I Can't Get Your Love?"	LARS; QUANG; Chou	3:16
11.	"Glory"	Ai	3:39
Total length:			42:36

== Music videos ==
#	Music video	Release date	Director
1	I Don't Know What Love Is	13/10/2014	
2	Sophisticated Games	16/10/2014	Jude Chen; HI-ORGANIC
3	Bad	22/10/2014	Bill Chia; bounce
4	Never Be The Same	6/11/2014	Bill Chia
5	Grown Love	13/11/2014	東頤製作×有勇氣
6	Glory	10/12/2014	Shi-Yuan Liao

== Awards and nominations ==
Year	Ceremony	Awards	Nominations	Result
2015
2015	Chinese Musicians Association; Top 10 Songs and Albums Presentation	Top 10 Albums of 2014	《Grown Love》	Won
2015	Chinese Musicians Association; Top 10 Songs and Albums Presentation	Top 10 Songs of 2014	Sophisticated Games	Won
2015	26th Golden Melody Awards	Golden Melody Award for Best Single Producer	Showan (Sophisticated Games)	Nominated
