= Eve Ai =

Taiwanese singer-songwriter (born 1987)

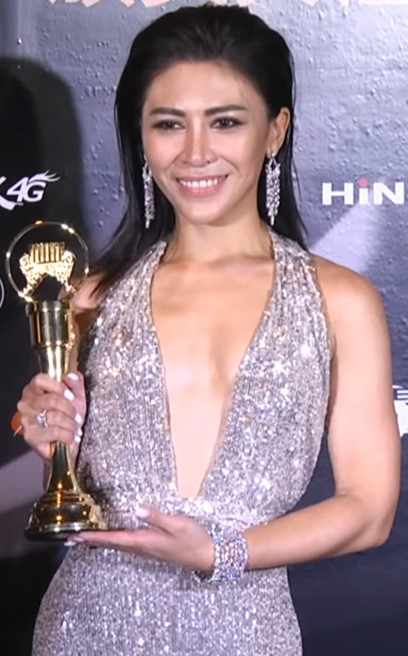
- Ai at a press conference on 29 June 2019, after receiving the Best Composer Award (Popular music, vocal category) at the 30th Golden Melody Awards (Popular music).
- Born: 24 March 1987 (age 39); Taiwan
- Education: National Taiwan University of Arts
- Occupations: Singer; songwriter
- Years active: 2010–present
- Agent: Tian Di He Entertainment
- Musical career
- Genres: Mandopop; Jazz; Soul; Reggae; Electronic Music
- Instrument: Vocals
- Label: EMI

Eve Ai Yi-liang (Chinese: 艾怡良; pinyin: Ài Yíliáng; born 24 March 1987) is a Taiwanese singer-songwriter. She was crowned the winner of Super Idol 5 in 2010.

In 2017, she won Best Mandarin Female Singer at the 28th Golden Melody Awards.

== Discography ==
=== Studio albums ===
- If You Luv Me (2012)
- Grown Love (2014)
- Talk About Eve (2016)
- Fade to Exist (2018)
- How Come I Still Remember All (2021)
- Whom Should I Ask? (2024)

=== Singles ===
Single	Released date	Note
"Waterfall"	17/5/2017	
"Guess I'm Pretty Good"	27/10/2017	2017 Toyota Prius c Ad. Song
"Love Sharing" (2017 Special Edition)	1/12/2017	ft. Miss Ko
"The Unrecognized"	4/1/2018	

=== Writing credits ===
This list shows her works for other artists.

Song	Artist(s)	Lyrics	Music	Released date	Album
"What You Wanna Do?"	A-mei	Eve Ai	Jian-wei Zhang; Mountain	4/4/2015	AMIT2
"Unfortunately"	Claire Kuo	Eve Ai、Evangeline	Victor Lau; Meng-Qi Wu	14/4/2015	My Sunshine Soundtrack; Constellation Women Series: Leo Woman Soundtrack
"Don't Get Bored With Each Other"	Rene Liu	Eve Ai	Eve Ai	22/9/2015	
"I Love Myself"	Landy Wen	Eve Ai	Gong	26/9/2015	
"Why Not Love"	Rosie Yang	Zu-Yin Huang; Chen-Mao Yu	Eve Ai	2/10/2015	Love Cuisine Soundtrack
"Myself"	Evan Yo	Eve Ai	Evan Yo	18/12/2015	
"Intersect"	Della Wu ft.Jia Jia	Eve Ai	Jae Chong	18/3/2016	
"From Awake to Willing to Fall Asleep"	Rose Liu	Eve Ai	Eve Ai	22/9/2016	Judge Me Not
"Habitual Love"	Xiao Yu	Eve Ai	Xiao Yu	7/4/2017	With You
"The Prayer"	Lala Hsu	Eve Ai	Eve Ai	5/12/2017	The Inner Me
"Story Thief"	A-mei	Eve Ai	Eve Ai	12/12/2017	Story Thief
"Catfight"	A-mei ft.Lala Hsu, Eve Ai	Eve Ai	Lala Hsu	12/12/2017	Story Thief

== Awards and nominations ==
=== Association of Music Workers in Taiwan ===
Year	Award	Nominated work	Result	Ref.
2015	Top 10 Albums of 2014	Grown Love	Won	
2015	Top 10 Songs of 2014	"Sophisticated Game"	Won	
2017	Top 10 Songs of 2014	"The Sum of Us"	Won	

=== Chinese Music Media Awards ===
Year	Award	Nominated work	Result	Ref.
2013	Best New Artist	—N/a	Won	

=== Golden Horse Awards ===
Year	Award	Nominated work	Result	Ref.
2021	Best New Performer	I Missed You	Nominated	
2021	Best Original Film Song	I Missed You	Won	

=== Golden Melody Awards ===
Year	Award	Nominated work	Result	Ref.
2013	Best New Artist	If You Luv Me	Nominated	
2017	Album of the Year	Talk About Eve	Nominated	
2017	Best Mandarin Album	Talk About Eve	Nominated	
2017	Best Mandarin Female Vocalist	Talk About Eve	Won	
2017	Song of the Year	"The Sum of Us"	Nominated	
2017	Best Composer	"The Sum of Us"	Nominated	
2017	Best Lyricist	"The Sum of Us"	Nominated	
2018	Best Composer	"The Prayer" (from The Inner Me)	Nominated	

=== HITO Music Awards ===
Year	Award	Nominated work	Result	Ref.
2017	Rising Female Artist	—N/a	Won	

=== Spotify (Taiwan) ===
Year	Award	Nominated work	Result	Ref.
2017	Spotify Most Streamed Female Singer in Taiwan	—N/a	20th place	

=== Super Idol 5 ===
Year	Award	Nominated work	Result	Ref.
2011	—N/a	—N/a	Champion	

=== Taipei Film Awards ===
Year	Award	Nominated work	Result	Ref.
2021	Best New Talent	I Missed You	Nominated	
