= Waterfall (Eve Ai song) =

Single by Eve Ai
- Released: 17 May 2017
- Genre: Mandopop
- Length: 5:34
- Label: Sony Music Taiwan
- Songwriter: Eve Ai
- Producer: Chen Chien Chi

Eve Ai singles chronology
"Escape Plan" (2016)	"Waterfall" (2017)	"Bad Check" (2017)

Music video
- "Waterfall" on YouTube

"Waterfall" is a song recorded by Taiwanese singer-songwriter Eve Ai. It was written by Eve and produced by Chen Chien-Chi. The song was released as a non-album single, on 17 May 2017 by Sony Music Taiwan. It is a Mandopop song with electric arrangement, which comprises a melody based on electric guitar, violin, viola and cello.

== Background ==
It took around one year for Eve to write the song. According to her, she came up with the song during a hiking trip around a lake in Taiwan.

== Personnel ==
Personnel list adapted from the description of Waterfall music video.

Song production

- Eve Ai – songwriting, lead vocals, vocal harmonies writing, backup vocal
- Chen Chien Chi – producer
- Huang Shao Yong – arranger
- Han Li Kang – guitar
- Liu Han – string writing, cello
- Cai Yao Yu – violin
- Lu Szu Chien – violin
- Gan Wei Peng – viola
- Wen Yi Zhe – engineering
- Chen Yi Lin – engineering
- Wang Jun Jie – mix engineering
- Cai Zhi Zhong – executive producer

Music video

- Xu Li Yun – actress
- Hsieh Shan Shan – actor
- Kang Xiang – actor
- Yeh Chen Ting – actress
- Birdy Nio – director, conceptualization
- Wang Pin Xiang – conceptualization
- Sun Wei Qiang – producer
- Li Wei Chen – line producer
- Wang Hong Cheng – production assistant
