= If You Luv Me =

If You Love Me 如果你愛我

Studio album by Eve Ai
- Released: November 2, 2012
- Genre: Mandopop; jazz; soul
- Length: 40:34
- Label: Sony Music Taiwan
- Producer: Bing Wang; An-an Tso; Jamie Hsueh; Tianjian Liu

Eve Ai chronology
If You Love Me 如果你愛我 (2012)	Grown Love (2014)

Singles from If You Love Me
- 1. "If You Love Me" Released: 29 October 2012; 2. "Don't Say It" Released: 15 November 2012; 3. "Sensitive" Released: 3 December 2012

If You Love Me (Chinese: 如果你愛我) is the debut studio album released on 2 November 2012 by the Taiwanese singer-songwriter, Eve Ai. This album has been produced for over 1 year, where Metal Girl was Eve's first original soul song.

== Track listing ==
Standard edition
No.	Title	Writer(s)	Length
1.	"Don't Say It"	Wei Lin; Pezen	4:31
2.	"Dark Angel"	Wei Kai Cui; Ayah Marar; Emre Ramazanoglu; Stephen William Hodd	3:36
3.	"If You Luv Me"	Eve Ai; An-an Tso	4:02
4.	"Sensitive"	Ding Ding; Pezen	3:29
5.	"Critical Moment"	Yee Kar Yeung; Lala Hsu	4:18
6.	"Learned"	Lin; Jiahui Wu	3:46
7.	"Ku Jin Ai Lai"	Guo Lu; Andrew Jackson; Mark Crew	4:22
8.	"You Decide"	I-Wei Wu; Jade Ell; Mats Tarnfors	2:58
9.	"Before I Love You"	Evan Yo	4:14
10.	"Metal Girl"	Ai; Kevin Wu; Jay	5:27
Total length:			40:34

== MV ==
- 《If You Love Me》 (Directed by Hung-i Chen)
- 《Don't Say It》 (Directed by Shawn Yu)
- 《Sensitive》 (Directed by Shawn Yu)

== Charts ==
Chart	Date for landing the chart	Peak position
G-music	November 9, 2012	16
Five Music	November 9, 2012	3
Guangnan	November 5, 2012	2
