= Talk About Eve =

Talk About Eve 說艾怡良

Studio album by Eve Ai
- Released: May 27, 2016
- Genre: Mandopop; Electronic Music; Reggae; Rock
- Length: 43:09
- Label: Sony Music Taiwan

Eve Ai chronology
Grown Love (2014)	Talk About Eve 說艾怡良 (2016)	Fade To Exist (2018)

Talk About Eve (Chinese: 說艾怡良) is the third studio album from Taiwanese female singer-songwriter, Eve Ai, released on 27 May 2016. She has received seven nominations from 28th Golden Melody Awards and won the Golden Melody Award for Best Female Vocalist Mandarin.

== Tracklisting ==
CD

Standard edition
No.	Title	Writer(s)	Length
1.	"Say"	Eric Chou; Eve Ai	4:12
2.	"Harmless Loneliness"	Ai; Alex Chang Jien	4:20
3.	"Our Sum"	Ai	4:16
4.	"Bad Check"	Ai	5:07
5.	"Escape Plan"	Ai	3:57
6.	"Lost Piece"	Hong-Yu Chen; Kim Seok Jin	3:45
7.	"Take Me To A Sunny Island"	Kevin Wu; Ai	4:00
8.	"Then You Come Along"	Ai	5:11
9.	"Lean On"	Evan Yo; Ai	3:35
10.	"This Is Love"	Jien	3:16
Total length:			43:09

== Awards and nominations ==
Year	Ceremony	Awards	Nominated Works	Result	Ref
2017
2017	28th Golden Melody Awards	Album of the Year	Talk About Eve	Nominated	
2017	28th Golden Melody Awards	Best Mandarin Album	Talk About Eve	Nominated	
2017	28th Golden Melody Awards	Best Mandarin Female Vocalist	Herself	Won	
2017	28th Golden Melody Awards	Song of the Year	"The Sum of Us"	Nominated	
2017	28th Golden Melody Awards	Best Composer	"The Sum of Us"	Nominated	
2017	28th Golden Melody Awards	Best Lyricist	"The Sum of Us"	Nominated	
2017	28th Golden Melody Awards	Best Music Management	Azher (Bad Check)	Nominated	
2017	Association of Music Workers in Taiwan Top 10 Songs and Albums Presentation	Top 10 Song of 2016	Our Sum	Won	

== Music Videos ==
#	Music video	Release date	Director
1	Our Sum	19/5/2016	Zhi-Bo Wang
2	Harmless Loneliness	2/6/2016	LEO
3	Lost Piece	3/8/2016	Wang
4	This Is Love	26/8/2016	—
5	Escape Plan	8/9/2016	—
6	Bad Check	26/6/2017	—
