= 21st Golden Melody Awards =

Taiwanese music awards ceremony in 2010

- Location: Taipei Arena, Taiwan
- Hosted by: Harlem Yu & Dee Hsu

Television/radio coverage
- Network: TTV

A stage model of the 21st Golden Melody Awards ceremony, on display as part of the TTV 60th Anniversary Special Exhibition.

Ceremonies of the 21st Golden Melody Awards were held at the Taipei Arena in Taipei, Taiwan on June 26, 2010.

== Eligibility ==
Registration for entry into the 21st Golden Melody Awards was opened from December 15, 2009 to January 4, 2010.

== Nominees and winners ==
=== Popular Music categories ===
==== Song of the Year ====
- "Come If You Dare" — A-mei
  - "Desperado" — Super Band
  - "Fish" — Cheer Chen
  - "Riding A White Horse" — Lala Hsu
  - "Singing in the Trees" — Claire Kuo

==== Pop Album of the Year ====
- A-MIT — A-mei
  - Hui Wei — Karen Mok
  - If You See Him — Tanya Chua
  - Immortal — Cheer Chen
  - Lala Hsu — Lala Hsu

==== Best Male Pop Vocal Performance ====
- David Tao — Opus 69
  - Eason Chan — Fifth Floor's Happiness
  - JJ Lin — 100 Days
  - Khalil Fong — Timeless
  - Jam Hsiao — Princess

==== Best Female Pop Vocal Performance ====
- A-mei — A-MIT
  - Cheer Chen — Immortal
  - Karen Mok — Hui Wei
  - Tanya Chua — If You See Him
  - Tiger Huang — Simple/Not Simple

==== Best Music Video ====
- Will Lin, Chen Ying Zhi/ “Daylight” by Sodagreen

==== Best Composer ====
- Chen Hsiao Hsia “Singing in the Tree”

==== Best Lyricist ====
- Lin Hsi/Kai Men Jian Shan “Amit”

==== Best Musical Arranger ====
- Martin Teng/Hao Dan Ni Jiu Lai “Amit”

==== Best Album Producer ====
- Ah Di Zai “Amit”

==== Best Single Producer ====
- Mavis Fan “Owner”

==== Best Band ====
- 1976

==== Best Vocal Group ====
- Da Hsi Men
  - Xiao Fei Xing — katncandix2
  - Come On! Bay Bay! — Come On! Bay Bay!
  - Super Girl — Super Junior-M
  - Moving On — Power Station

==== Best New Artist ====
- Lala Hsu — Lala Hsu
  - A-Chord — Nothing But A Chord
  - Alisa Galper — Alisa Galper
  - Shadya Lan — The Secret
  - Soft Lipa — Winter Sweet

==== Best Taiwanese Male Singer ====
- Hsiao Huang-chi “People Who Love to Dream”

==== Best Taiwanese Female Singer ====
- Zeng Xin Mei “Go-Between”

==== Best Album ====
- Farming Together — Yen Yung-neng
  - Dreamer — Hsiao Huang-chi
  - Live — Jody Chiang
  - Film — Zhan Ya Wen

==== Best Hakka Singer ====
- Emily Guan “Tou Bai De Ni”

==== Best Aboriginal Singer ====
- Chalaw and Passiwali “Lao Lao Che”

==== Best Aboriginal Album ====
- “Ba Bu Chuan Sho” Bunun Aboriginals

==== Best Album ====
- Paper Eagle/ Sizhukong Jazztet

==== Best Album Producer ====
- Peng Yu Wen/ Paper Eagle

==== Best Composer ====
- Li Yan Yun/Da Tao Cheng “Story Island”

==== Jury Award ====
- Li Zong Cheng, Luo Da You, Zhou Hua Jian, Chang Cheng Yue/ Zong Guan Xian SUPER BAND Bei Shang Lie Che

==== Special Contributions Award ====
- Ang It-hong
