= Dezadeash Lake =

Lake in Yukon, Canada

- Location within Yukon
- Location: Yukon
- Coordinates: 60°29′N 136°58′W
- Basin countries: Canada
- Max. length: 19 km (12 mi)
- Surface area: 82.5 km^{2} (31.9 sq mi)
- Average depth: 4.1 m (13 ft)
- Max. depth: 6.0 m (19.7 ft)

Dezadeash Lake is a lake of Yukon, Canada. It borders Kluane National Park, and lies along the edge of the Saint Elias Mountains. The lake is approximately 19 kilometres (12 mi) long with an area of about 82.5 square kilometres (31.9 sq mi), a maximum depth of 6.0 metres (19.7 ft) and mean depth of 4.1 m (13 ft).

A World War II military camp was based by the lake, at kilometre 202 (mile 125) of the Haines Highway, during the construction of the Haines and Alaska highways. This camp was later converted into a lodge named Dezadeash Lodge in the 1960s. The lodge passed through various owners including Merle Lien, the father of recording artist Matthew Lien.

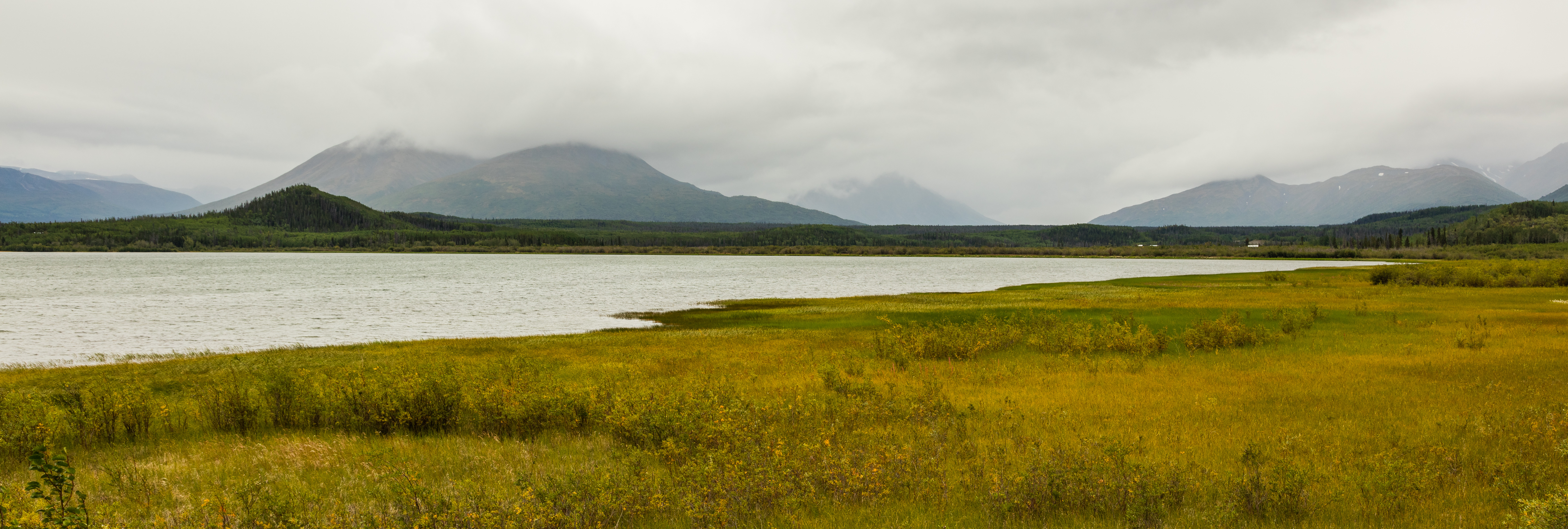
Dezadeash Lake, as seen from Haines Highway

== See also ==
- List of lakes in Yukon
