= Europa Huang =

- Born: November 2, 1983 (age 42); Hsinchu, Taiwan
- Education: National Cheng Kung University
- Occupations: Singer-songwriter, producer, occupational therapist
- Years active: 2006–present
- Musical career
- Also known as: Huang Jianwei; Huang Chien-wei
- Genres: Folk music, Mandopop
- Instruments: Vocals, guitar
- Labels: Wind Music, Warner Music Taiwan

Europa Huang (born November 2, 1983) is a Taiwanese singer-songwriter, producer and occupational therapist.

He won an award given by the Ministry of Culture, Taiwan for the Best New Artist at the 18th Golden Melody Awards for his 2006 debut album Over the Way. In 2017 Huang won the Best Composer award at the 28th Golden Melody Awards for the song "Centrifugal Force".

== Personal life ==
Huang attended the National Experimental High School, and graduated from the National Cheng Kung University in Tainan, with a degree in occupational therapy.

== Discography ==
=== Studio albums ===
Title	Album details	Track listing
Over the Way	Released: October 25, 2006; Label: Wind Music; Formats: CD, digital download	Track listing: 1. Little Egret, Rain, Scarecrows 鷺鷥雨稻草人; 2. Over the Way; 3. 5 Strings; 4. As Flowing As Wind 可風; 5. The Autumn of South 南瀛之秋; 6. Innocence 純真; 7. Like a Friend; 8. The Field of Sugar Canes 甘蔗田; 9. White Road 白色公路; 10. A Carefree Day 無憂的一天; 11. Dandelion 蒲公英; 12. In the Mood of Flying
Come to Me	Released: September 29, 2008; Label: Wind Music; Formats: CD, digital download	Track listing: 1. The Birds of Youth 青鳥; 2. Come to Me; 3. No Clouds and Rain, No Clear Skies 也無風雨也無晴; 4. A Cloud in the Sky 天邊一朵雲; 5. Tomorrow's Affairs 明天的事; 6. Her Voice Comes from Afar 遠處傳來她的聲音; 7. Toot-toot Song 嘟嘟歌; 8. Irresolute Youth 徬徨少年時; 9. Everything; 10. The Questions of Childhood 童年的疑問; 11. Compass 羅盤
Another Journey 再一次旅行	Released: August 23, 2011; Label: Wind Music; Formats: CD, digital download	Track listing: 1. Wenshui 汶水; 2. Another Journey 再一次旅行; 3. I'm Your Little Singer; 4. Cucurrucucu 鴿子呀鴿子; 5. Hutong (An Alley) 胡同; 6. Perfect Child 完美小孩; 7. Where Is the Light; 8. Mama's Wish Upon a Star 媽媽的小星願; 9. The Wind Through the Rice Paddies (Improvised Performance) 吹過稻田的風（即興演奏曲）; 10. Little Prince 小王子; 11. When You Come Floating By 當你飄來
Embraceable You 我擁抱的是...	Released: May 16, 2014; Label: Warner Music Taiwan; Formats: CD, digital download	Track listing: 1. Urgent Call 非常召集; 2. Waiting for Fruitful Melon 等待甜瓜; 3. Taiwan Gin Na 三郎; 4. Stand By You 咱的夢在這; 5. Run! 嘿！走吧; 6. Paradise; 7. Embraceable You 我想擁抱的 是一路裝作勇敢的你; 8. Chasing You 追 9. Hey! My Girl 嘿！芳誼; 10. Dear Tong Tong 童童歌; 11. The 15th Day 三郎 我可不可以 靠著你的肩膀; 12. Road 小路(Bonus Track)

=== Extended plays ===
Title	Album details	Track listing
Little Tree, Summer Dream 夏樹的期待	Released: July 27, 2007; Label: Wind Music; Formats: CD, digital download	Track listing: 1. Be My Valentine 愛的 Shalala; 2. Butterfly 蝴蝶; 3. This World 這個世界; 4. Butterfly (Piano & Vocal) 蝴蝶(鋼琴演唱版)
Will You Sing Me A Song?	Released: April 2009; Label: Wind Music; Formats: CD, digital download	Track listing: 1. The Last Trick (Story About Lens Morrison); 2. Will You Sing Me A Song; 3. 胡同2006
Summer 我和我的藍爆炸頭在夏天 數位原創Demo	Released: October 2009; Label: Wind Music; Formats: CD, digital download	Track listing: 1. I'm Your Little Singer; 2. Circle of Life; 3. 沒有用的我忍不住打了通電話給你
Hey ! Little Girl 嘿!小女孩	Released: August 10, 2012; Label: Warner Music Taiwan; Formats: CD, digital download	Track listing: 1. You Are The Apple of My Eye; 2. 嘿！小女孩; 3. 夏雨(演奏曲); 4. 悠游; 5. 不安於室; 6. So？！; 7. 一起踢球吧！

=== Singles ===
Year	Title	Notes
2010	"In Case of Love"	In Case of Love soundtrack
2012	"Familiar Home 熟悉的家園"	Charity single
2014	"Light Pollution"	Yuk-cheung Chun feat. Europa Huang
2014	"Flaming Beacon 烽火"	With William Wei and Lala Hsu
2014	"The World Is Your Gift 送給我的世界"	Misi Ke feat. Europa Huang
2015	"Before Tomorrow 我倆沒有明天"	
2016	"Universe of Hearts"	Love in Vain soundtrack

=== Songs written ===
Year	Artist	Title	Music	Lyrics
2008	Yuan Quan	"Baby Sleep"	Yes	Yes
2009	Yoga Lin	"Gone With the Wind"	Yes	Yes
2011	Christine Fan	"The Little Prince"	Yes	Yes
2011	Tseng Jin-wen	"Mu Mu"	Yes	Yes
2012	James Wen and Megan Lai	"Meet the Right One"	Yes	No
2013	Koala Liu	"Keep Dreaming"	Yes	No
2014	Lala Hsu	"Missing"	Yes	No
2016	Faith Yang	"Centrifugal Force"	Yes	No

=== Albums produced ===
Year	Artist	Title
2013	Pepe Shimada	Cat Play
2013	Various	A Moment of Love original soundtrack
2016	Various	Never Said Goodbye original soundtrack

== Awards and nominations ==
Year	Award	Category	Nominated work	Result
2006	Association of Music Workers in Taiwan	Top 10 Singles of the Year	"Over the Way"	Won
2007	18th Golden Melody Awards	Best New Artist	Over the Way	Won
2012	3rd Golden Indie Music Awards	Best Folk Album	Another Journey	Nominated
2015	26th Golden Melody Awards	Best Composer	"Missing"	Nominated
2017	28th Golden Melody Awards	Best Composer	"Centrifugal Force"	Won
2017	28th Golden Melody Awards	Best Single Producer	"Centrifugal Force"	Nominated
