= Dangerous World =

2014 studio album by Khalil Fong

Studio album 危險世界 by Khalil Fong
- Released: 11 April 2014
- Recorded: 2013–2014
- Genre: Mandopop
- Length: 56:01
- Language: Mandarin, English
- Label: Gold Typhoon Music
- Producer: Khalil Fong

Khalil Fong chronology
Back to Wonderland (2012)	Dangerous World (2014)	Journey to the West (2016)

Dangerous World (traditional Chinese: 危險世界; simplified Chinese: 危险世界) is Hong Kong Mandopop artist Khalil Fong's Mandarin album. It was released on 11 April 2014 by Gold Typhoon Music. The first song he introduced was the English single "Lights Up" which he performed at concerts in late 2013. He described it as "hip-hop infused", "old school", and "bit harder-hitting."

== Accolades ==
In 2015, this album was nominated for the Best Vocal Recording Album Award at the 26th Golden Melody Awards, and Fong was nominated for the Best Mandarin Male Singer Award at the 26th Golden Melody Awards for this album.

== Track listing ==
No.	Title	Length
01	Welcome (純音樂)	0:07
02	Dangerous World (危險世界)	6:14
03	Peace Feat. Tia Ray	5:32
04	Xiao Fang (小方)	3:53
05	Soundcheck	0:34
06	Black White & Grey (黑白灰)	3:33
07	Love Blossoms (桃花運)	3:23
08	Special Person (特別的人)	4:19
09	Weather Report	1:01
10	Mr. Weather (天氣先生)	4:31
11	Autumn Leaves (楓葉做的風鈴)	3:55
12	Boarding	0:21
13	Paris (巴黎)	4:13
14	No Love (愛不來) Feat. Miss Ko 葛仲珊	4:40
15	Zombie (殭屍)	4:50
16	Lights Up	4:55

== Music videos ==
No.	Title	Director
2	Dangerous World 危險世界	Khalil Fong 方大同
3	Peace Feat. Tia Ray	Fiona Sit 薛凱琪
4	Xiao Fang 小方	Khalil Fong 方大同
6	Black White & Grey 黑白灰	Khalil Fong 方大同
8	Special Person 特別的人	Khalil Fong 方大同@P.R.C./ Derrick Sepnio@P.R.C.
13	Paris 巴黎	Saba Mazloum
14	No Love 愛不來 (feat. Miss Ko葛仲珊)	Khalil Fong 方大同@P.R.C./ Derrick Sepnio@P.R.C.
