= Missing (album) =

Studio album 尋人啟事 by Lala Hsu
- Released: 13 June 2014
- Genre: Mandopop
- Length: 41:50
- Language: Mandarin
- Label: AsiaMuse
- Producers: Lala Hsu, Chen Chien-Chi (陳建騏)

Lala Hsu chronology
Ideal Life (2012)	Missing (2014)	The Inner Me (2017)

Missing (Chinese: 尋人啟事; pinyin: xún rén qǐ shì) is Taiwanese Mandopop artist Lala Hsu's fourth Mandarin solo studio album. It was released by AsiaMuse on 13 June 2014.

== Track listing ==
No.	Title	Lyrics	Music	Translation	Length
1.	"尋人啟事" (xún rén qǐ shì)	Hush	Europa Huang	Missing	4:34
2.	"明天的事情" (míng tiān de shì qing)	Ge Da Wei (葛大為)	Lala Hsu	Steady	4:57
3.	"樹洞的聲音" (shù dòng de shēng yīn)	Lan Xiao Xie (藍小邪)	Lala Hsu	The Secrets	4:16
4.	"不安小姐" (bù ān xiǎo jie)	Sandee Chan	Lala Hsu	Miss Worry	3:46
5.	"潛規則" (qián guī zé)	Lala Hsu	Lala Hsu	Unwritten Rules	4:06
6.	"我沒時間討厭你" (wǒ méi shí jiān tǎo yàn nǐ)	Lala Hsu	Lala Hsu	Confession	4:03
7.	"高空彈跳" (gāo kōng tán tiào)	Lala Hsu	Lala Hsu	Extreme	4:44
8.	"糖果粉碎者" (táng guǒ fěn suì zhě; featuring Ellen Joyce Loo)	Wyman Wong	Lala Hsu	Candy Crusher	4:51
9.	"耳邊風" (ěr biān fēng)	Lala Hsu	Lala Hsu	Gone with the Wind	3:41
10.	"別怕" (bié pà)	Rene Liu	Lala Hsu	Be Strong	3:27
11.	"只要一分鐘" (zhǐ yào yī fēn zhōng)	Lala Hsu	Lala Hsu	One Minute More	4:01

Notes

- "只要一分鐘 (One Minute More)" is the theme song of the 2014 film of the same name.

== Music videos ==
Song	Release date	Ref
"尋人啟事" (Missing) (lyric edition)	15 May 2014	
"尋人啟事" (Missing)	4 June 2014	
"明天的事情" (Steady)	12 June 2014	
"尋人啟事 (紀念珍藏版 MV)" (Missing) (special edition)	15 June 2014	
"不安小姐" (Miss Worry)	29 June 2014	
"潛規則" (Unwritten Rules)	10 July 2014	
"高空彈跳" (Extreme)	25 July 2014	
"耳邊風" (Gone with the Wind)	31 July 2014	
"樹洞的聲音" (The Secrets)	7 August 2014	
"糖果粉碎者" (Candy Crusher)	14 August 2014	
"我沒時間討厭你" (Confession) (lyric edition)	14 August 2014	
"別怕" (Be Strong)	14 August 2014	

== Awards and nominations ==
26th Golden Melody Awards - 2015
Category	Nomination	Result
Song of the Year	"Missing" ("尋人啟事")	Nominated
Best Mandarin Album	Missing (尋人啟事)	Nominated
Best Composer	Europa Huang for "Missing" (尋人啟事)	Nominated
Best Lyricist	Hush for "Missing" (尋人啟事)	Nominated
Best Music Arranger	Chen Chien-chi (陳建騏) for "Missing" (尋人啟事)	Nominated
Best Mandarin Female Singer	Lala Hsu for Missing (尋人啟事)	Nominated
