= Matthew Lien =

- Born: Matthew Carl Lien; 10 May 1965 (age 61); San Diego, California, U.S.
- Origin: Whitehorse, Yukon, Canada
- Occupation: Singer-songwriter
- Years active: 1987–present
- Website: matthewlien.com

Matthew Carl Lien (/liːˈɛn/ lee-EN; born 10 May 1965) is a Canadian world music singer-songwriter and producer. His primary lyrical and musical focus is on environmental and cultural themes.

== Career ==
During his childhood in San Diego, Lien would visit his father at Dezadeash Lake, Yukon each summer, eventually moving there when he was 16.

Lien taught himself to play piano when he was 10 years old, and later learned how to record and produce music in high school and afterwards.

He also taught himself to score for contemporary, traditional folk, and classical musicians by asking friends for help and working long hours alone.

As recording was an expensive undertaking for the independent Lien, he would work at various jobs in California or in the Yukon, until he saved enough money, and then record three songs at a time in San Diego studios.

The first song he ever formally recorded was in a recording studio at San Diego Senior High School. The song, called "Kecia's Song," was inspired by the death of his friend and classmate, Kecia Cummings.

After high school, he recorded three more songs at Hit Single recording studio, with a classic rock band "Down To Earth" for which he was lead singer and keyboardist.

He later recorded his own solo material in San Diego recording studios, at Mix Masters recording studios, where he received a certificate in Advanced Engineering, and at Steve Vaus Productions where he met recording engineer Michael W. Harris.

As Lien's recordings became more advanced, with numerous musicians and layers of diverse instrumentation, he eventually required more advanced studios with automation, such as Lyonshare and The Complex in Hollywood, California.

Preferring his native San Diego to Los Angeles, he discovered Signature Sound recording studios in San Diego, California, which is owned by his friend and musician/producer Luis Arteaga whom he met earlier at Mix Masters, where he recorded most of his albums to date, with the exception of his Hybrid SACD "Arctic Refuge" which was recorded at Bryan Adams' Warehouse Studio in Vancouver, British Columbia, Canada.

Lien's first international release, "Bleeding Wolves," was released in southeast Asia by independent record distributor Wind Music of Taiwan. The non-pop album became a sensation, rapidly achieving multi-platinum status in Taiwan, and having sold millions of copies on the piracy market in China.

He now has a fan base of millions in Taiwan and China, where he is known for his environmental music and his work with aboriginal and traditional cultures. His profile in Taiwan is such that he has received government appointments and is sought for commercial endorsements.

== Activism ==
Matthew Lien is the President of the John Graham Defense Committee.

Matthew Lien is a co-founder the Caribou Commons Project, a coalition of artists and activists working for the permanent protection of Alaska's Arctic National Wildlife Refuge. Matthew Lien has also released two albums focusing on the same issue, including "Caribou Commons", and "Arctic Refuge".

== Personal ==
In 2009, Lien married Ms. Liu Kuan-yu (English name: "Daisy"), a Taiwanese national from a well-connected family in Miaoli County. Daisy gave birth to a son on 24 May 2009. He was married three times previously. Matthew's father, Merle "The Flying Squirrel" Thorman Lien died on 2 September 2014. He was 83 years old.

== Awards ==
- 2002 – West Coast Music Award – Best Yukon Artist: In So Many Words
- 2004 – Golden Bell Award (China, Hong Kong, Taiwan and Singapore's NAB-equivalent) – Best Radio Production of a Commercial Advertisement
- 2005 – Golden Melody Awards (China, Hong Kong, Taiwan and Singapore's Grammy-equivalent) – Best Crossover Album: Journey of Water

== Nominations ==
- 2000 – Golden Melody Award – Best Instrumental Album: Voyage To Paradise
- 2008 – Golden Bell Award
- Best Comprehensive Program: Hakka TV Hafun Taiwan Show
- Best Directing Non-Drama Program: Hakka TV Hafun Taiwan Show
- Best Sound Award: Hakka TV Hafun Taiwan Show
- 2009 – Golden Melody Award
- Best Crossover Album Album: Hakka Heartland
- Best Musical Arranger: Hakka Heartland
- Best Album Producer: Hakka Heartland
- 2011 – Western Canadian Music Award – Best World Album: Orchid Island
- 2011 – Golden Melody Award – Best Album Producer: Orchid Island

== Other awards and honours ==
- Canada Parliamentary Certificate of Honour
- Received China's Mr. Modern GQ Environmentalist of the Year award
- Esquire China Magazine 2012 Man of the Year for Environmental Accomplishments
- Appointed Special Envoy to Taiwan by the Government of Yukon
- Appointed Cultural Ambassador by the Ministry of Culture, Taiwan
- Appointed Ambassador of Taiwan Rivers by Water Resources Agency, Ministry of Economic Affairs, Taiwan
- Appointed spokesperson for HiNet (2009–2011), Taiwan's largest ISP
- Appointed Ambassador of Annual Taipei Car-Free Day by Taipei City Government
- China's Travel Channel headline performing artist and philanthropy award recipient
- Appointed Environmental Protection Education Program Spokesperson for the Environmental Protection Administration, Executive Yuan, Taiwan

== Discography ==
- 1987: Music to See By (re-released in 2003 with the bonus song "Unicorn")
- 1995: Bleeding Wolves
- 1997: Confluence
- 1999: Voyage to Paradise
- 1999: Caribou Commons (with various artists)
- 2000: Touching the Earth
- 2001: In So Many Words
- 2003: Unicorn
- 2004: Arctic Refuge
- 2005: A Journey of Water
- 2005: Arctic Refuge
- 2006: The Universal Musician – Matthew Lien Live in Concert (2-DVD)
- 2007: Moving Through Twilight
- 2008: Adventures in the Hakka Heartland
- 2008: Spirits of Orchid Island (soundtrack music for HD-DVD by PTS Taiwan)
- 2010: Orchid Island
- 2011: Bleeding Wolves Reborn
- 2012: Where Does Love Go
- 2013: Jing-First Light
- 2014: 8000
- 2014: Headwaters – Music of the Peel River Watershed
