= Edward Chan =

Hong Kong music producer (born 1976)

- 陳浩然
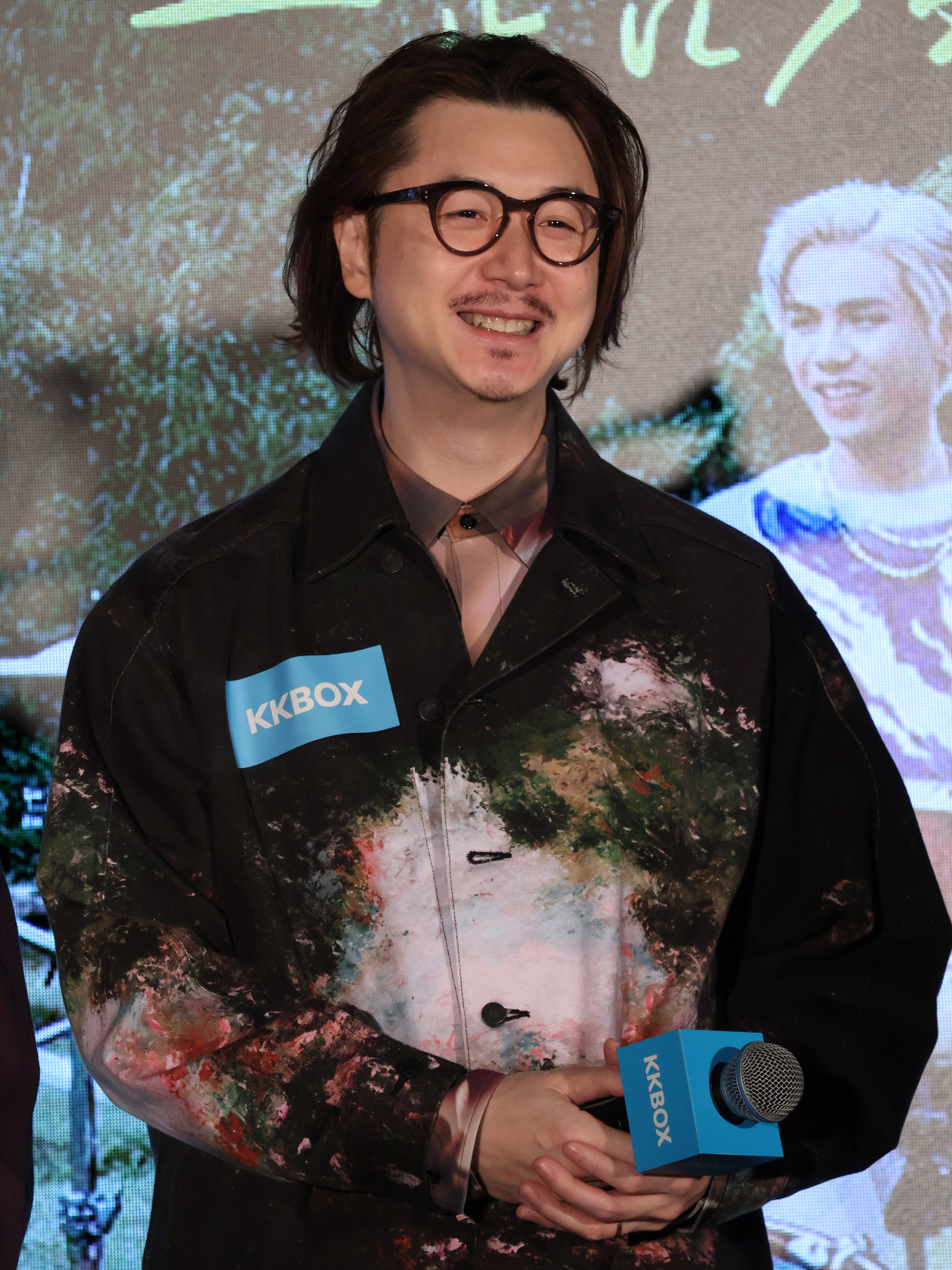
- Chan in December 2024
- Born: 10 March 1976 (age 50); British Hong Kong
- Education: Music department Bachelor's degree
- Alma mater: Yaumati Catholic Primary School; Wah Yan College, Kowloon; Hong Kong Baptist University; Chinese University of Hong Kong
- Occupations: Arrangement, composer, music producer
- Years active: 1998–present
- Musical career
- Genres: Cantopop, Mandopop
- Instruments: Piano, electronic drum, bass guitar
- Labels: Warner Music Group; Novasonic production (2001–present); Edward Music Production (2006–present); Sony Music Entertainment Hong Kong (2013–present)

Chinese name
- Traditional Chinese: 陳浩然
- Simplified Chinese: 陈浩然
Transcriptions
Standard Mandarin
- Hanyu Pinyin: Chén Hàorán
Yue: Cantonese
- Jyutping: can4 hou6 jin4

Edward Chan Ho-Yin (born 10 March 1976) is a Hong Kong based Cantopop and Mandopop music producer, songwriter and musician. He is engaged in composing Cantonese pop songs, working as a record producer and concert music director. He is currently also a consultant for the artists and repertoire department of a record company, mainly supporting young talents in the music industry.

== Early life ==
Chan was influenced by his father's love of Cantonese songs since he was a childhood. He learned piano (grade eight), electronic drums, electric bass, and arrangement at a music store skills, and developed in related fields with the encouragement of his parents. He studied at Yaumati Catholic Primary School and Wah Yan College Kowloon, and then studied the preparatory music course of Hong Kong Baptist University. He then entered the Department of Music of the Chinese University of Hong Kong, majoring in composition, and studied under composer Chan Wing-wah.

== Career ==
Since 1998, he has been arranging music for Hong Kong pop singers. In his third year grade of university, he joined Wave Music Works founded by Kenny Bee, mainly serving as a pianist and arranger, and also composing music for various movies, stage plays, and commercials. In 2000, he joined Warner Music Hong Kong and became a contracted composer. In 2001, he opened his own recording studio Novasonic Production (Nova Studio, Nova Lab) with Charles Lee. In 2003, he and Chet Lam were both musicians in the copyright department of Warner Music Hong Kong, and they jointly produced three albums, Travelogue 1 (遊樂), Travelogue 2 (一個人在途上), and Travelogue 3 (城市旅人). He also served as the music director of "Chet Lam Travelling Live 2004" (林一峰遊樂會) and participated in more than 160 concerts.

In 2005, Chan produced Khalil Fong's first debut solo album Soulboy. In the following seven years, he produced a total of seven albums. Among them, the album 15 and the song "It's not easy" (好不容易) helped Fong won the CRHK's 2011 Ultimate Song Chart Awards Presentation "Supreme Album Award and Supreme Song Award" and gradually became known to the public. In 2006, he established the music production company Edward Music Production, which has nurtured more than a dozen composers or lyricists including Terry Chui (徐浩), Randy Chow (周錫漢), Cousin Fung (馮家俊) and published more than 270 works in China, Hong Kong, Taiwan and South Korea.Since his debut, he has worked with many singers, including The Wynners, Alan Tam, Pan Dihua, Anita Mui, Hacken Lee, Jacky Cheung, Aaron Kwok, Andy Hui, Sammi Cheng, Eason Chan, Joey Yung, Twins, Miriam Yeung, Coco Lee, Chet Lam, Fiona Sit, Pakho Chau, HotCha, Phil Lam, and Jason Chan; He is currently mainly responsible for arranger and music producer, and is also a consultant to the A&R Department of Sony Music Entertainment Hong Kong Limited (since 2013) and a special lecturer at the Department of Music (Creative industries) of Hong Kong Baptist University (since 2020).
