= Ideal Life =

Studio album 理想人生 by Lala Hsu
- Released: 6 June 2012
- Genre: Mandopop
- Length: 40:31
- Label: Asiamuse
- Producer: Lala Hsu, Chen Chien-Chi (陳建騏)

Lala Hsu chronology
Limits (2010)	Ideal Life (2012)	Missing (2014)

Ideal Life (Chinese: 理想人生) is the third self-created album by Lala Hsu, the pre-order of which started on 14 May 2012. The official release was on 6 June 2012, and the album included new songs and some songs published on streetvoice before. Lala Hsu was still in charge of the production, covering lyrics, music, creation and harmony. More importantly, the only producer invited was Chen Chien-Chi (陳建騏), who had been cooperating with Lala Hsu since her first album. The preemption concert was held on 18 May 2012, and Lala Hsu's YouTube channel was founded at the same time.

== Track listing ==
No.	Title	Lyrics	Music	Chinese Name	Length
1.	"Cuckoo"	Lala Hsu	Chen Chien-Chi	布谷 (bù gǔ)	3:43
2.	"Rolling! My Baby!"	Yuan Wei Xiang (袁偉翔)	Lala Hsu	翻滾吧！我的寶貝 (fān gǔn ba wǒ de bǎo bèi)	3:24
3.	"I Dare You"	Ge Da Wei (葛大為)	Jackie@White Music (HK)	你敢不敢 (nǐ gǎn bù gǎn)	3:53
4.	"Dare to Celebrate"	Lala Hsu	Han Li Kang (韓立康)	不怕慶祝 (bú pà qìng zhù)	4:38
5.	"Chili Pepper"	Lala Hsu	Han Li Kang (韓立康)	辣椒 (là jīao)	4:05
6.	"Not That Hard"	Ge Da Wei (葛大為)	Chen Chien-Chi (陳建騏)	不難 (bù nán)	4:39
7.	"Bottleneck"	Lala Hsu	小毛@輕鬆玩, Chen Chien-Chi (陳建騏)	瓶頸 (píng jǐng)	4:31
8.	"Palette"	Lala Hsu	Chen Chien-Chi (陳建騏)	調色盤 (tiáo sè pán)	4:00
9.	"Ideal Life"	Ge Da Wei (葛大為)	Ba Si Liang (巴思亮)	理想人生 (lǐ xiǎng rén shēng)	4:04
10.	"Lala's Squad"	Ge Da Wei (葛大為), Lala Hsu	Chen Chien-Chi (陳建騏)	拉拉隊 (lā lā duì)	3:34
Total length:					40:31

Notes

- "調色盤 (Palette)" is the soundtrack of the film Touch of the Light.
- "不怕慶祝 (Dare to Celebrate)" is the promotional song of the film Keep the Lights On in Taiwan.
- "布穀 (Cuckoo)" and "翻滾吧！我的寶貝 (Rolling! My Baby!)" are the theme songs of the short film The Girl Who Swims Breaststroke.

== Music Videos ==
Song	Version	Debut	By	Starring
Not That Hard (不難)	Pre on YouTube	18 May 2012	Director:Fu Tian Yu (傅天余); Cameraman:Fu Shi Ying (傅士英); Art Director:Chen Bo Ren (陳柏任); Cutter:Lin Yong Yi (林雍益)	Mo Zi Yi (莫子仪); Amber Kuo (郭采潔)
Not That Hard (不難)	MV on YouTube	23 May 2012	Director:Fu Tian Yu (傅天余); Cameraman:Fu Shi Ying (傅士英); Art Director:Chen Bo Ren (陳柏任); Cutter:Lin Yong Yi (林雍益)	Mo Zi Yi (莫子仪); Amber Kuo (郭采潔)
I Dare You (你敢不敢)	MV on YouTube	6 June 2012	Director:Chen Hong Yi (陳宏一); Dance director:Yu Yan Fang (余彥芳)	
Palette (調色盤)	MV on YouTube	22 June 2012		
Dare to celebrate (不怕慶祝)	MV (Cut) on YouTube	9 July 2012		None (Part of 《為你流的淚》)
Dare to celebrate (不怕慶祝)	MV on YouTube	20 July 2012	Director:You Shao (游紹)	Fan Ma Ke (范馬可)
Ideal Life (理想人生)	MV on YouTube	17 August 2012	Director:Fu Tian Yu (傅天余)	

== Awards ==
24th Golden Melody Awards - 2013

Year	Category	Nomination	Result
2013	Best Mandarin Female Singer	Lala Hsu for Ideal Life (理想人生)	Nominated

Association of Music Workers in Taiwan (中華音樂人交流協會) - 2012

Year	Category	Nomination	Result
2013	Best Mandarin Album	Ideal Life (理想人生)	Won
2013	Song of the Year	Not That Hard (不难)	Won
