= Lala Hsu (album) =

Studio album by Lala Hsu
- Released: 29 May 2009
- Genre: Mandopop
- Length: 49:14
- Language: Mandarin
- Label: AsiaMuse

Lala Hsu chronology
Lala Hsu (2009)	Limits (2010)

Lala Hsu (Chinese: LaLa首張創作專輯; pinyin: LaLa shǒu zhāng chuàngzuò zhuānjí) is Taiwanese Mandopop artist Lala Hsu's self-titled debut studio album. It was released by AsiaMuse on 29 May 2009. Seven tracks were originally performed in the third season of CTV's One Million Star including additional four new tracks. The album is a bestseller both in Taiwan and Singapore upon its release.

Hsu won the "Best New Artist" award with this album at the 21st Golden Melody Awards.

== Background ==
In 2008, Hsu took part in the third season of One Million Star singing contest with aims to set up a chicken restaurant with the prize money.

In the second episode, Hsu performed her self-composed song titled "Waltz" and "Knowingly and Willfully" in the following episode. Throughout the competition, Hsu continued to sing her own compositions and in the sixth episode, her performance of her song "Riding a White Horse" scored 25 points, making her the fastest contestant to reach the full score since the launch of One Million Star. Hsu continued to perform her original songs including "Exit", "The Same Moonlight" and "White Flag" on the eight, tenth and twenty-seventh episode respectively.

On 15 August 2008 during the finals, she performed two more original self-composed songs, "Down in Sandbar" and "Perfume" which earned her an average score of 21.47 points, paving the way for her to become a professional singer.

== Track listing ==
All tracks are written by Lala Hsu

No.	Title	Length
1.	"Delicious" (喔伊細)	3:42
2.	"Waltz" (圓舞曲)	4:21
3.	"VIP"	3:35
4.	"Down in Sandbar" (失落沙洲)	4:59
5.	"White Flag" (白旗)	3:30
6.	"Riding a White Horse" (身騎白馬)	5:13
7.	"The Same Moonlight" (一樣的月光)	4:00
8.	"Knowingly and Willfully" (明知故犯)	4:58
9.	"Exit" (出口)	3:06
10.	"Sing a Love Song" (哼情歌)	3:40
11.	"Unlocked Door (Bonus Track)" (沒鎖門)	3:07
Total length:		44:14

== Awards and nominations ==
21st Golden Melody Awards, Taiwan - 2010
Award	Nomination	Result
Song of the Year	"Riding a White Horse" (身騎白馬)	Nominated
Pop Album of the Year	Lala Hsu	Nominated
Best New Artist	Lala Hsu - Lala Hsu (徐佳瑩)	Won
Best Composer	"Riding a White Horse" (身騎白馬) - Su Tongda (蘇通達), Lala Hsu	Nominated
Best Musical Arranger	"Riding a White Horse" (身騎白馬) - Su Tongda (蘇通達)	Nominated
Best Single Producer	"Riding a White Horse" (身騎白馬) - Su Tongda (蘇通達)	Nominated
