= Tseng Hsin-mei =

Tseng Hsin-mei 曾心梅
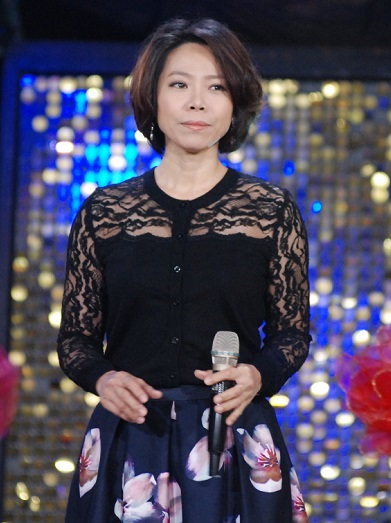
- Tseng in 2015
- Born: Tseng Hsiao-ping 曾小萍; 6 August 1970 (age 55)
- Occupations: Singer, songwriter
- Years active: 1988–present
- Awards: Golden Melody Awards – Best Dialect Female Singer; 1996; Best Taiwanese Female Singer; 2010 Golden Bell Awards – Best Singing/Musical Variety Show; 2004
- Musical career
- Origin: Taiwan
- Genres: Hokkien pop
- Instrument: Singing

Tseng Hsiao-ping (Chinese: 曾小萍; born 6 August 1970), known by her stage name Tseng Hsin-mei (Chinese: 曾心梅) is a Taiwanese Hokkien pop singer and television host. She has won two Golden Melody Awards, in 1996 and 2010, and one Golden Bell Award, in 2004.

== Discography ==
- 1988: 胭脂酒; Rouge Wine
- 1989: 海口人; Haikou People
- 1990: 冷情千千意千千
- 1991: 娜奴娃的探戈
- 1993: 愛情這呢冷
- 1994: 酒是舞伴，你是性命
- 1995: 天公疼憨人
- 1996: 思念你的心肝，你敢知; Miss your Heart, You Dare to Know
- 1996: 曾心梅舞厶ㄚˋ厶ㄚˋ 第一回 水車姑娘
- 1996: 曾心梅舞厶ㄚˋ厶ㄚˋ 第二回 思慕的人
- 1998: 認份; Recognition
- 1998: 永遠不同; Forever is not Different
- 1999: 幫你打 原曲新唱系列I
- 1999: 幫你打 原曲新唱系列II
- 2000: 甲天借膽
- 2002: 半包菸; Half Pack of Cigarettes
- 2009: 牽線; Pull strings
- 2011: 珍愛心梅; Cherish Hsin-Mei
- 2014: 雨水; Rainwater
