= Limits (album) =

Studio album 極限 by LaLa Hsu
- Released: 3 September 2010
- Genre: Mandopop
- Length: 40:06
- Language: Mandarin
- Label: AsiaMuse

LaLa Hsu chronology
Lala Hsu (2009)	Limits (2010)	Ideal Life (2012)

Limits (Chinese: 極限; pinyin: Jíxiàn) is the second Mandarin studio album of Taiwanese Mandopop artist Lala Hsu (Chinese: 徐佳瑩). It was released on 3 September 2010 by AsiaMuse. The pre-order edition is released on 16 August 2010.

== Background ==
On 29 May 2009, Lala Hsu released her self-titled debut album containing self-composed songs she performed in the third season of CTV's One Million Star. In the first episode, she performed her self-composed song for the first time, titled "The Rest of Love" which was not included in her previous album. She also performed "Perfume" during the finals, along with "Down in Sandbar" which was included in her previous album.

== Track listing ==
All tracks are written by Lala Hsu

No.	Title	Length
1.	"Go to My Home" (去我家)	3:45
2.	"Limit" (極限)	3:49
3.	"Acrophobia" (懼高症)	4:31
4.	"Perfume" (香水)	3:47
5.	"Love"	3:51
6.	"Oasis" (綠洲)	4:13
7.	"The Rest of Love" (殘愛)	3:54
8.	"Paradise" (樂園)	3:39
9.	"Time Master" (時間大師)	3:27
10.	"Disco" (迪斯可)	5:10
Total length:		40:06
