= Soulboy (album) =

2005 studio album by Khalil Fong

Studio album by Khalil Fong
- Released: 18 November 2005
- Recorded: 2005
- Genres: Mandopop, soul, R&B
- Length: 49:26
- Language: Mandarin
- Label: Warner Music Hong Kong
- Producers: Khalil Fong, Edward Chan, Charles Lee

Khalil Fong chronology
Soulboy (2005)	This Love (2006)

Singles from Soulboy
- 1. "Spring Breeze" Released: 5 May 2005

Soulboy is the debut Mandarin album by Hong Kong Mandopop artist Khalil Fong. It was released on 18 November 2005 by Warner Music Hong Kong.

== Background ==
Soulboy was influenced by Fong's childhood in Hawaii, taking inspiration from Ritchie Valens's music and many other 1960s–70s musicians like Sam Cooke, Stevie Wonder and James Brown. Fong's father was a professional drummer, and Fong began to learn percussion instruments at an early age. As a teenager, he started to learn to play the guitar and actively submitted his own music audition demo tapes to record companies, but he was turned away for being too young. However, in 2000, Warner Music Group took notice of Fong's demo and made him a behind-the-scenes composer and producer. Fong went on to compose many songs for other singers such as Andy Lau, Jacky Cheung, Chen Kun, A-Mei and Sammi Cheng.

In 2003, when Sammi Cheng noticed that Fong wanted to sing, she personally went to Warner's music arrangement director to vouch for him. However, a change in the company's senior management prevented him from pursuing a career as a singer.

Through continuous efforts, in 2005, Warner Music adopted a "listen to the voice but not the person appeared" approach to pave the way for Fong's debut, arranging for him to participate in major concert performances.

On 5 May 2005, Fong was invited to open for the Taiwanese pop rock group F.I.R's live broadcast concert. Fong sang the songs "Spring Breeze" and "Sound of the South" (南音). These songs draw from Fong's experience living in both Eastern and Western cultures, which provided him with rich materials and inspiration for his debut album. Integral to this cultural fusion is Fong's use of soul music, popularized by African-American musicians, combined with the foundation of Chinese music that characterizes Fong's unique musical style.

== Composition ==
Soulboy is an album of R&B and soul combined with traditional Chinese music. The lead song, "Spring Breeze," is a cappella, with beatboxing to act as the percussion. Fong's singing voice lends to his unique blend of R&B and Zhongguo feng, along with Western blues lyrics that feature Hong Kong flavor words such as "peach blossoms (桃花), willow trees (柳树), Yumen Pass (玉门关), Nanniwan (南泥湾)" and a soothing melody, giving this love song a pop music flavor. The song also includes harmony and draws inspiration from Lovin' You, produced by Stevie Wonder for Minnie Riperton.

The song "Sound of the South" features piano and erhu instrumentals, tying into the song's title about classical nanguan music. The melody turns from a minor scale into a major scale. The lyrics tell the story of blind Chinese musician Abing's life and inner spiritual world, focusing on his erhu song "Erquan Yingyue" (二泉映月). Fong's lyrics reflect the bitterness of pursuing dreams and the regretlessness to pursuing reputation and living situation. This song demonstrates Fong's respect for his traditional music and culture. While his musical attitude aims to express modern emotions through traditional musical forms, Fong's work also embodies an attempt to pass on and innovate traditional culture.

== Title and art work promotion ==
The album's theme is "world harmony" (世界大同), with a focus on serious content like society, life and human nature Soulboy contains songs in Mandarin, as the label's plan was for Fong to target the Mandarin-speaking markets of mainland China and Taiwan. The title Soulboy was also a name Fong used when he served as an instrumental accompanist on other creative works by himself and other singers.

== Released and reception ==
The album Soulboy was released on 18 November 2005, quickly gaining popularity with Mandopop fans. Fong's hit songs from this era include "Spring Breeze" (春風吹) and "Everyday" (每天每天) from the album, and Fong gained a reputation as "Hong Kong David Tao" and "Hong Kong Jay Chou." Fong, along with three other singer-songwriters, Ivana Wong, Hins Cheung and Louis Cheung, are known as the "Four Little Powers of Hong Kong Singers and Songwriters."

== Track listing ==
All arrangements are by Khalil Fong. All producers are Khalil Fong, Edward Chan and Charles Lee.

No.	Title	Music Composition	Lyrics
01	Prologue	Khalil Fong	Khalil Fong
02	Little Sister (妹妹)	Khalil Fong	Khalil Fong
03	Spring Breeze (春風吹)	Khalil Fong	Chow Yiu Fai
04	Everyday (每天每天)	Khalil Fong	Chen Yuzhen
05	Woman (女人)	Khalil Fong	Khalil Fong, Liang Rulan
06	Tell Me How to Say (叫我怎麼說)	Khalil Fong	Khalil Fong
07	Who's Scared (哪怕)	Khalil Fong	Liang Rulan
08	Sound of the South (南音)	Khalil Fong	Albert Leung
09	Can We? (我們能不能)	Khalil Fong	Khalil Fong
10	Jump (跳)	Khalil Fong	Khalil Fong
11	Conclusion (總結)	Khalil Fong	Chow Yiu Fai
12	Rushing (趕場)	Khalil Fong	Khalil Fong, Liang Rulan
13	Waiting for You to Be Back (等著你回來)	Yan Kuan	Khalil Fong, Yan Kuan
14	Know You (Hidden Track) (認識你)	Khalil Fong	Khalil Fong

== Credits and personnel ==
- A&R – Evi Yang, Tommy Chui
- Arranged by Vocals, Instruments – Khalil Fong
- Art Direction – Eunice Volume 2
- Executive-Producer – Gary Chan
- Graphic Design – Tony Volume 2
- Illustration – David Lai, K.D.T Soulboy
- Photography By – Paul Tsang
- Post Production – Cyndi Fung, Maggie Cheung, Shannie Yu
- Mixing – Frankie Hung, Edward Chan, David Sum, Simon Li
- Producer – Charles Lee, Edward Chan, Khalil Fong

== Accolades ==
IFPI Hong Kong Record Sales Award 2005 - Top 3 Best Selling Male Local Newcomers. On 1 January 2006 evening CRHK's Ultimate Song Chart Awards presentation was take place in Hong Kong Convention and Exhibition Centre and Fong was won Chik Chak New Male Singer Silver award. Chinese Music Media Awards Best Male Newcomer Award nominated in 2006 .

Awards and nominations for Soulboy and the song work
Award ceremony	Year	Category	Result	Ref.
IFPI Hong Kong	2006	Hong Kong Record Sales Award 2005 - Top 3 Best Selling Local Male Newcomers	Won	
CRHK's Ultimate Song Chart Awards Presentation	2006	Chik Chak New Male Singer	Silver	
Chinese Music Media Awards	2006	The 6th Chinese Music Media Awards Best Male Newcomer Award	Nominated	
