= Gei (Lala Hsu album) =

Studio album by Lala Hsu
- Released: 22 June 2022
- Genre: Mandopop
- Length: 40:19
- Language: Mandarin
- Label: AsiaMuse
- Producer: Lala Hsu, Howe Chen (陳君豪)

Lala Hsu chronology
The Inner Me (2017)	Gei (2022)

Singles from Gei
- 1. "Prototype (雛形)" Released: 9 September 2021; 2. "None of the Above (以上皆非)" Released: 25 November 2021; 3. "Like a Star (準明星)" Released: 3 June 2022

Gei (Chinese: 給; pinyin: gěi) is the sixth studio album by Taiwanese singer and songwriter Lala Hsu, released by AsiaMuse on 22 June 2022. Hsu and Howe Chen served as the album's producers, with David Ke as production coordinator. The album is released four and a half years after her fifth studio album The Inner Me (2017), followed by her marriage and childbirth. Hsu explored genres such as dance, retro, and disco, breaking her previous albums' style with usual slow-tempo ballads.

At the 33rd Golden Melody Awards, Hsu received three nominations including Song of the Year and was awarded the Best Single Producer with Chen for her single "None of the Above". At the 34th Golden Melody Awards, Hsu was nominated for a total of eight awards, six of which are for the album including Best Mandarin Album, Song of the Year for her single "Like a Star", and Best Female Mandarin Singer among other technical awards.

== Track listing ==
No.	Title	Lyrics	Music	Length
1.	"Like a Star" (準明星)	David Ke, Lala Hsu, Howe Chen, Luigi Creatore, Hugo E Peretti, George David Weiss	David Ke, Lala Hsu, Howe Chen, Luigi Creatore, Hugo E Peretti, George David Weiss	3:29
2.	"Break Off (featuring ABAO & Brandy)" (切歌)	David Ke, ABAO, Brandy	Lala Hsu, Howe Chen	3:40
3.	"Vanishing Love" (沒有第三者的分手)	David Ke	Lala Hsu	4:40
4.	"Gei" (給)	Lala Hsu	Lala Hsu, Howe Chen	4:18
5.	"The Hangover (featuring Huang Ruei-Fong)" (二日醉)	Lala Hsu, David Ke, Money Zhang	Lala Hsu, Chen Jinming	3:32
6.	"Care about You" (在意這件事)	David Ke	Lala Hsu, Howe Chen	3:23
7.	"The Little Babe" (小寶貝)	Lala Hsu	Lala Hsu, Howe Chen	0:42
8.	"None of the Above" (以上皆非)	David Ke	Lala Hsu, Howe Chen	4:33
9.	"The Lion" (離開動物園的獅子)	David Ke	Lala Hsu, Howe Chen, Lin Xie	4:11
10.	"Fearless" (我想到你就再也不怕)	Lala Hsu	Lala Hsu	3:49
11.	"Prototype" (雛形)	Lala Hsu	Lala Hsu	4:02
Total length:				40:19

Song	Director	Release date	Link
Prototype (雛形)		9 September 2021	MV
None of the Above (無人知曉)	Bill Chia (比爾賈)	25 November 2021	MV
Like a Star (準明星)	Yangmenren (羊門人)	8 June 2022	MV
Vanishing Love (沒有第三者的分手)	Cheng Yu-Chieh (鄭有傑)	8 June 2022	MV
Break Off (feat. ABAO & Brandy) (切歌)	Aikolove Liu (劉明群)	27 July 2022	MV
Gei (給)	Bill Chia (比爾賈)	23 September 2022	MV
Fearless (我想到你就再也不怕)	Yin Chen-hao (殷振豪)	16 November 2022	MV

== Awards and nominations ==
33rd Golden Melody Awards, Taiwan - 2022
Award	Nomination	Result
Song of the Year	"Prototype"	Nominated
Best Single Producer	"None of the Above" - Lala Hsu, Howe Chen (陳君豪)	Won
Best Music Video	"None of the Above" - Bill Chia (比爾賈)	Nominated

34th Golden Melody Awards, Taiwan - 2023
Award	Nomination	Result
Song of the Year	"Like a Star"	Nominated
Best Mandarin Album	Gei	Nominated
Best Vocal Recording Album	Gei	Nominated
Best Female Mandarin Singer	Lala Hsu	Nominated
Producer of the Year, Album	Lala Hsu	Nominated
Best Music Video	"Gei" - Bill Chia (比爾賈)	Nominated
