= Wind Music (record label) =

- Founded: 1988
- Founder: Ken Yang
- Genre: Taiwanese music, Chinese music
- Country of origin: Taiwan
- Location: New Taipei City
- Official website: www.windmusic.com.tw/en

Wind Music (Chinese: 風潮音樂; pinyin: Fēngcháo Yīnyuè), formerly Wind Records is an independent record label based in New Taipei City, Taiwan specializing in traditional Taiwanese and Chinese music. The company has recorded a number of collections of documentary recordings, notably of the music of the minority peoples of Taiwan and China.

The company was founded in 1988 by flautist Ken Yang (Chinese: 楊錦聰; pinyin: Yáng Jǐncōng). Wind Music artists include musicians from both China and Taiwan, as well other countries. Wind Music's output is classified into six categories: traditional Chinese instrumental music, Chinese health music, ethnic music, Chinese religious music including Buddhist music, Chinese new-age music/Chinese ambient music, and Wind's popular collections.

Wind has recorded projects by artists such as Matthew Lien and founder Ken Yang himself.
