= The Inner Me (Lala Hsu album) =

Studio album by Lala Hsu
- Released: 27 December 2017
- Recorded: November 2016 – September 2017
- Genre: Mandopop
- Length: 45:12
- Language: Mandarin
- Label: AsiaMuse

Lala Hsu chronology
Missing (2014)	The Inner Me (2017)	Gei (2022)

Singles from The Inner Me
- 1. "You Made My Day (是日救星)" Released: 26 December 2016; 2. "The Prayer (言不由衷)" Released: 1 December 2017; 3. "The Grey (灰色)" Released: 20 December 2017

The Inner Me (Chinese: 心裡學; pinyin: xīn lǐ xué) is the fifth album by the Taiwanese singer and songwriter Lala Hsu, released by AsiaMuse on 27 December 2017.

At the 29th Golden Melody Awards, The Inner Me was nominated in five categories and eventually won Best Album in Mandarin and Best Female Vocalist — Mandarin for Hsu.

== Track listing ==
No.	Title	Lyrics	Music	Length
1.	"The Prayer" (言不由衷; yán bù yóu zhōng)	Eve Ai	Ai	4:21
2.	"The Grey" (灰色; huī sè)	Yu Tian; Hsieh Chin-lin; Lala Hsu	Yu	5:22
3.	"From Now On" (到此為止; dào cǐ wéi zhǐ)	Ge Da Wei	Hsu	3:40
4.	"When You Leave" (記得帶走; jì dé dài zǒu)	Hsu	Hsu	4:26
5.	"The Patient" (病人; bìng rén)	Daryl Yao	Hsu	3:44
6.	"Just Dance" (現在不跳舞要幹嘛; xiàn zài bù tiào wǔ yào gàn ma)	Ge; Hsu	Hsu	3:36
7.	"Babes" (大頭仔; dà tóu zaǐ)	Hsu	Hsu	3:44
8.	"The Age of Innocence" (兒歌; ér gē)	Hsu	Hsu	3:31
9.	"We People" (人啊; rén a)	Nike; Hsu	Hsu	3:39
10.	"The Inner Me" (心裡學; xīn lǐ xué)	Hsu	Hsu	5:02
11.	"You Made My Day" (是日救星; shì rì jiù xīng)	Hsu	Zheng Nan; Hsu	4:08
Total length:				45:12

== Music videos ==
Song	Director	Release date	Ref
"You Made My Day"	Bill Chia	26 December 2016	
"The Prayer"	Bill Chia	5 December 2017	
"The Grey"	Bill Chia	25 December 2017	
"The Inner Me"	Liu Ming Qun	12 January 2018	
"Just Dance"	Starr Chen	21 February 2018	
"From Now On"	Chia	13 March 2018	
"The Patient"	Chia	21 May 2018	

== Awards and nominations ==
28th Golden Melody Awards - 2017
Category	Nomination	Result
Best Arrangement	"You Made My Day"	Nominated
Best Single Producer	"You Made My Day"	Won

29th Golden Melody Awards - 2018
Category	Nomination	Result
Album of the Year	The Inner Me	Nominated
Best Album in Mandarin	The Inner Me	Won
Best Female Vocalist — Mandarin	The Inner Me	Won
Best Composer	"The Prayer"	Nominated
Best Music Video	"The Prayer"	Nominated
