= Khalil Fong =

Hong Kong singer (1983–2025)

- 方大同
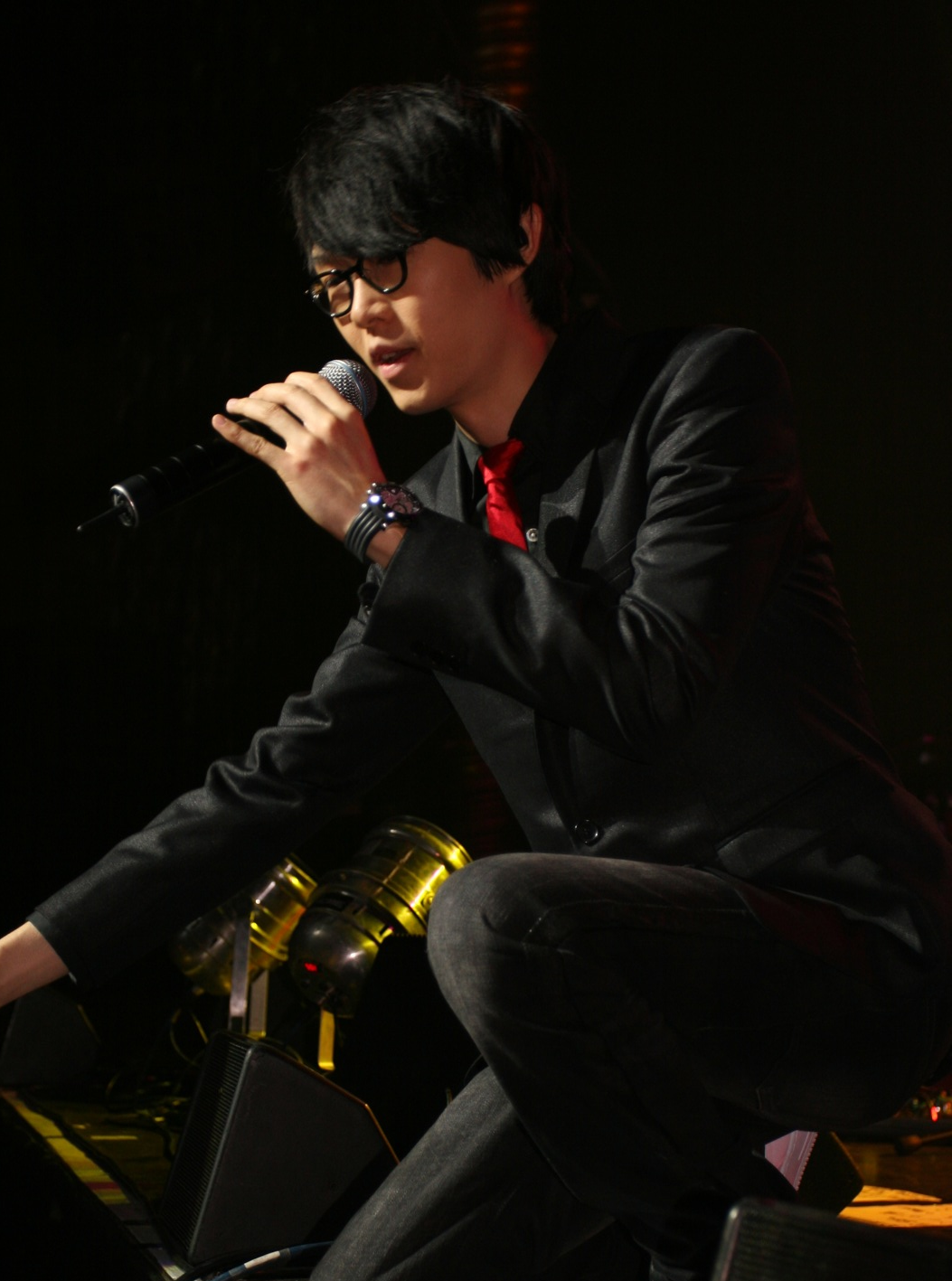
- Fong in 2010
- Born: 14 July 1983; Kauaʻi County, Hawaii, U.S.
- Died: 21 February 2025 (aged 41); Dali, Yunnan, China
- Occupations: Singer-songwriter; record producer
- Years active: 2005–2025

Chinese name
- Chinese: 方大同
Transcriptions
Standard Mandarin
- Hanyu Pinyin: Fāng Dàtóng
Yue: Cantonese
- Jyutping: fong1 daai6 tung4
- Musical career
- Origin: Hong Kong
- Genres: R&B; soul; neo soul; hip-hop; blues; funk; mandopop
- Instruments: Vocals; guitar; drums; percussion; piano
- Labels: In Hong Kong: Warner Music (2005–2013); Gold Typhoon (2013–2014); FU MUSIC (2016–2025); In Taiwan: Warner Music (2005–2013); Gold Typhoon (2013–2014); Ocean Butterflies (2016–2025)
- Website: khalilfong.com

Khalil Fong Tai-tung (Chinese: 方大同; 14 July 1983 – 21 February 2025) was a Hong Kong singer-songwriter, notable for infusing a R&B and soul sensibility into Chinese pop music. He won the 28th Golden Melody Award for Best Male Mandarin Singer for his album Journey to the West (2016).

== Early life and education ==
Khalil Fong was born on 14 July 1983 in Hawaii, United States, to an American-Chinese father, a drummer, and Hong Kong mother, Leung Yu-laam (梁茹嵐), an English language educator, who would later be Fong's lyricist under the pen name Rulan (茹嵐). He was the grandson of Frances Fong. Khalil Fong's passion for music was ignited after watching the movie "La Bamba" at a young age. The movie, which tells the story of Ritchie Valens and his hit song "La Bamba," inspired him to pursue a career in music.

Fong moved to Shanghai at the age of 5, then Guangzhou for a brief period before moving to Hong Kong when he was 14. Due to the family frequently moving to different cities, Fong initially studied in a primary school in Shanghai for five years, before being homeschooled by his parents until high school.

== Career ==
=== Early beginnings: Before being a musician ===
When Fong was 12, the family moved to Guangzhou and he would frequently accompany his father to sing at different bars. When he was 14, after moving to Hong Kong, he started writing over 100 tunes for his mother's English language education company, forming part of the company's audio learning resources. He started to self learn to play guitar when he was 15 and piano when he was 18, and subsequently sent many demos to different record companies at the age of 17. However, due to his relatively young age and changes in the management of the recording company, Warner Music Group, he was not able to sign a recording contract until he was 22 in 2005. Until then, he would write songs for other singers such as Andy Lau and Jacky Cheung.

=== 2005–2008: Soulboy, This Love, Wonderland, and Orange Moon ===
In 2005, Fong signed a recording contract with Warner Records. He then debuted with his first album, Soulboy, featuring soul and R&B, which were rare styles in the Chinese music industry, and drawing inspiration from musicians like Stevie Wonder, Musiq Soulchild, Michael Jackson and Earth, Wind & Fire. The album won him several awards such as IFPI Hong Kong's 2005 Top 3 Best Selling Male Local Newcomers and CRHK's Chik Chak New Male Singer Silver award in 2006.

In 2006, Fong released This Love album, which continued to receive positive reviews from the media. As with Soulboy, this album received awards for being one of the top 10 selling Mandarin albums for the year, and as well as its titular track, Popular Mandarin Song awards from 2007 Metro Radio Mandarin Hits Music Awards and 2006 Metro Radio Music Awards.

In 2007, Fong held his first concert, "This Love Live 2007" at Hong Kong Arts Centre from 1–3 February, a live album of the performance was released on 23 August. On 28 December, Fong released his third album, Wonderland, which was the first album to be released in Taiwan as well. With love and environmental protection as its theme, the blue coloured album cover had two holes on the sides of the ears of Fong's portrait printed on it. The blue colour would represent Earth while the holes represented the ozone layer, bringing awareness to the holes in the ozone layer. Record label Warner Music Hong Kong specially chose to radio broadcast "Love Song" on major radio stations on 14 February 2008 as a special music theme for Valentine's Day in mainland China, Hong Kong and Taiwan, bringing listeners into love theme. "Love Song" topped the music charts in Hong Kong and Taiwan and would go on to win awards at the 8th Global Chinese Music Awards, Beijing Pop Music Awards, HITS Music Awards. The album earned Fong his first Golden Melody Award nomination.

In March 2008, Fong held two concerts, titled "Wonderland Live 2008, at Kowloonbay International Trade & Exhibition Centre, a live album of the performance was released on 29 July. In December, Fong released his fourth studio album Orange Moon; the album, as promised by Fong, contained songs that are "catchier and more approachable" compared to his previous releases. The title was inspired by the romanticism of sunset, where the orange moon refers to the sun. For the album, Fong received awards at the Chinese Music Media Awards and the Global Chinese Music Chart Awards Ceremony.

=== 2009–2012: Timeless, 15, and Back to Wonderland ===
In 2009, Fong released his fifth studio album and first cover album Timeless on 11 August, it contained songs in Mandarin and English that had inspired him to pursue music. In support of the album, Fong held concerts in 2009 at Hong Kong Convention and Exhibition Centre on 27–29 August, a live album of his performance was released on 27 November. For his work on this album, Fong received his second Golden Melody Award nomination.

In 2010, Fong had a cameo appearance in Love in Disguise, directed and written by Fong's good friend Wang Leehom. Same year, Fong was hospitalized multiple times due to pneumothorax.

In February 2011, Fong made his debut at the CMG New Year's Gala, performing "This Love" with Jam Hsiao and Li Jian. On 21 April, he released his sixth studio album 15, the title was to commemorate the age when he first learned the guitar. 15 received mixed reviews for Fong's attempt to integrate blues, rock, soul, and R&B as well as the shift toward more plainspoken lyrics; likely anticipating the reaction, Fong stated this was "a challenge for me in terms of music and the stories or thoughts I want to share with everyone, and it will also be a challenge for the audience." Fong won Best R&B/Soul Artist at the 12th Chinese Music Media Award for his work on this album.

From August 2011 to December 2012, Fong embarked on his first concert tour "15方大同Khalil Fong" with 15 stops spanning Hong Kong, Taiwan, China, Malaysia, and Macau. The live album of the Hong Kong concert was released on 23 December 2011. On 12 December 2012, Fong released his seventh studio album Back to Wonderland, a callback to his third studio album Wonderland. The album was a "collage of Fong's past music elements", returning to his earlier R&B and soul music styles and incorporating the experiments in his last three albums.

=== 2013–2017: Dangerous World and Journey to the West ===
In 2013, Fong's contract with Warner Records ended in July and he signed with Gold Typhoon in August. In November, Fong embarked on his second concert tour "Soulboy Lights Up"; the stage design concept was specifically inspired by the three characters of his name: "方" for the square-shaped stage, "大" for the large-scaled musical feast, and "同" for the use triangular iron frames. The concert tour began in Hong Kong on 30 November to 2 December 2013 and continued through most of 2014.

In 2014, Fong released his eighth studio album Dangerous World, it earned him his third Golden Melody Awards nomination.

In 2016, Fong launched the music label FU MUSIC (賦音樂) on 28 April. Fong released his ninth studio album Journey to the West on 28 September; the album contained two discs, one gold and one black: the style of the black disc is more modern and contemporary while the style of the "gold disc" is more classic. For this album, Fong received four nominations from Golden Melody Awards, bringing up his total to seven, and won his first Golden Melody Award for Best Male Artist.

In 2017, Fong stepped back from making music due to health concerns. Same year, he was named Billboard Radio China's artist of the year.

=== 2018–2024: Declining health, Emi The Dream Catcher #1, Home Sweet Home, and The Dreamer ===
In 2018, Fong released three bilingual children's graphic novels, The Secret of the Golden Bricks, Saving Snowy and The Tree of Life, under the series title Emi The Dream Catcher., about a girl who goes on adventures with whimsical creatures in her dreams. On 13 July, he released the extended play Emi The Dream Catcher #1. In 2020, he released another three, The Champion Spirit, Mr Inspiration and The Master of Darkness. All books were written by Fong and he oversaw their art direction and put out accompanying theme songs for each book. Writing the children's graphic novels are Fong's imaginative stories which honours a promise he made to his mother more than 10 years ago, that he would come up with a new method to convey the same principles and concepts (by promoting 3Q - Intelligence Quotient, Emotional Quotient and Virtue Quotient) his mother presented in her previous children's education programme before helping him as his business manager. Fong hoped that the protagonist, Emi would inspire the young readers to develop empathy, curiosity, imagination as well as care and service for the community, and explore their innate instincts and potentials, through her nature of truth, kindness and courage in her adventures. “I think these stories are a reminder to myself and others of the things we should be mindful of, to create a better society for future generations,” he said in an interview at the time.

Throughout 2018–2019, Fong continued releasing singles such as "Dear Ocean" featuring Diana Wang, "Fake Monk", and "White Hair". The latter won Fong Best Male Singer of the Year and Golden Song of the Year at the Global Chinese Pop Chart Awards (华人歌曲音乐盛典).

In 2020, Fong released the extended play Home Sweet Home on 19 June, which included the song "Noodles" that won Fong his second Golden Melody Awards for Best Single Producer. In 2021, Fong produced the science fiction romance Guidance, directed by Neysan Sobhani.

In 2024, Fong posted on his Weibo account that he had been "recovering from health issues" and throughout the journey, "found numerous moments of inspiration that have resulted in a new album". On 18 October, Fong released his tenth album The Dreamer, which he literally dubbed as a "sick" one because most songs were produced and arranged at his dining table at home with a handheld microphone during various stages of his illness. The album was deemed as “memoirs of this journey.” It was both a challenge and a relief from the rather tedious circumstance he was in then. However, through making the album, he encouraged his listeners not to forget how to be dreamers despite being faced with challenges in life. “I wanted to turn my weakness into strength and create an album that I can be proud of,” Fong said.

== Personal life ==
Fong was a member of the Baháʼí Faith, a religion teaching the essential worth of all religions, and the unity and equality of all people, as well as hopes to spread love and the message of moral integrity. He has been promoting the message of love, unity and peace, and made it his goal to traverse culture, genre and language to eliminate all division that he felt was unnecessary through his music creation. Fong's music also focuses on global issues, such as education, global warming, suicide, anti-drug abuse etc.

He was a vegetarian, and refrained from smoking, drinking and gambling. He was named PETA's "sexiest vegetarian" in year 2010 and 2012.

Fong enjoyed a close friendship with fellow record artiste Fiona Sit from when he entered the music industry. Sit promoted him when he debuted, singing duets with him. Fong would frequently write songs for her to sing throughout her career, acknowledging the fact with a statement at an awards ceremony that the songs are written for her first. Some of his works would become her best hits. Fong would become one of her pillars of strength when she had depression in 2008.

== Illness and death ==
Fong was reportedly diagnosed with pneumothorax since 2010, and struggled with it over the years. Fong died peacefully on 21 February 2025, (Note: Some press outlets speculated that he had died in Dali, Yunnan, or in the surrounding region, where his body was cremated.) at the age of 41 from an unspecified illness that affected him over the previous five years. A private funeral had been held and he was cremated and ashes scattered in Dali on 1 March 2025. His label FU MUSIC announced his death on 1 March 2025 through Facebook and Weibo. Fong left behind words of inspiration as follows for fans to embrace life's challenges and hold on to their dreams.

“Time waits for no one. As we age, we come to understand more deeply the duality of time – its reality and its illusion. Life presents us with countless twists and challenges, yet I believe one of our goals should be to navigate its path with grace and dignity,” Fong wrote.

“At this particular moment in my life, where everything seems to stand still, I am granted ample time to reflect on the past, contemplate the present with sincerity, and dream of the future."

“The name The Dreamer symbolizes that even in the face of illness and life’s many trials, I remain here, filled with creative vision and boundless dreams,” he added, referring to his latest 10-track album, which carried a similar message.

In a note left to fans after his death, Fong stated, “may you, in the days to come, continue to hold fast to your dreams, persevere in your efforts, grow, evolve and fully realize your potential at every stage of life.”

== Discography ==
=== Studio albums ===
Album title	Chinese title	Release date	Ref.
Soulboy	—N/a	18 November 2005	
This Love	愛愛愛	29 December 2006	
Wonderland	未來	28 December 2007	
Orange Moon	橙月	19 December 2008	
Timeless	可啦思刻	11 August 2009	
15	—N/a	21 April 2011	
Back to Wonderland	回到未來	12 December 2012	
Dangerous World	危險世界	11 April 2014	
Journey to the West	西遊記	28 September 2016	
The Dreamer	夢想家	18 October 2024	

=== Live albums ===
Album title	Chinese title	Release date	Ref.
This Love Live 2007	—N/a	23 August 2007	
Wonderland Live 2008	—N/a	29 July 2008	
Timeless Live	Timeless 演唱會Live專輯	27 November 2009	
Khalil Timeless Live in HK 2009	—N/a	28 January 2010	
15 Live in HK 2011	15 香港演唱會2011	23 December 2011	

=== Compilation albums ===
Album title	Chinese title	Release Date	Ref.
The Soulboy Collection	—N/a	26 November 2013	

=== Extended plays ===
Album title	Chinese title	Release Date	Ref.
Emi The Dream Catcher #1	—N/a	13 July 2018	
Home Sweet Home	宅這	19 June 2020	
Emi The Dreamer Catcher Graphic Novels 1–6 Mini Album	—N/a	21 January 2025	

== Filmography ==
=== Television series ===
- CRHK Love Park (戀愛樂園)

=== Film ===
Year	English title	Chinese title	Role	Notes	Ref.
2010	Love in Disguise	戀愛通告	Himself	Cameo	

== Awards and nominations ==
Year	Award	Category	Nomination	Result	Ref.
2005	Metro Radio Music Awards (新城勁爆頒獎禮)	New Hot Voice (勁爆熱播新聲音)	—N/a	Won	
2005	CRHK's Ultimate Song Chart Awards Presentation (叱咤樂壇流行榜)	Chik Chak New Male Singer (叱咤樂壇生力軍男歌手銀獎)	—N/a	Silver	
2006	Metro Radio Music Awards (新城勁爆頒獎禮)	Popular Song (新城勁爆歌曲)	"糖不甩" (Composed for Fiona Sit)	Won	
2006	Metro Radio Music Awards (新城勁爆頒獎禮)	Popular Mandarin Song (新城勁爆国语歌曲)	"This Love" (愛愛愛)	Won	
2006	IFPI Hong Kong Music Sales Awards	Top 3 Best Selling Local Male Newcomers (最暢銷本地男新人)	Soulboy	Won	
2006	CRHK's Ultimate Song Chart Awards Presentation (叱咤樂壇流行榜)	Chik Chak Producer (叱咤唱作人銀獎)	—N/a	Silver	
2006	RoadShow Music Awards	Supreme Song (至尊歌曲)	"This Love" (愛愛愛)	Won	
2006	RoadShow Music Awards	Most Potential Producer/Singer (至尊潛力創作歌手)	—N/a	Won	
2007	IFPI Hong Kong Music Sales Awards	Top 10 Selling Mandarin Albums of the Year	This Love (愛愛愛)	Won	
2007	Metro Radio Mandarin Hits Music Awards (新城國語力頒獎禮)	Popular Mandarin Hit Song (新城國語力歌曲)	愛愛愛	Won	
2007	Metro Radio Mandarin Hits Music Awards (新城國語力頒獎禮)	New Powers Singer (新勢力歌手)	—N/a	Won	
2007	Metro Radio Mandarin Hits Music Awards (新城國語力頒獎禮)	New Powers of Creation (創作新勢力)	—N/a	Won	
2008	CRHK's Ultimate Song Chart Awards Presentation (叱咤樂壇流行榜)	Chik Chak Male Singer (叱咤男歌手金獎)	—N/a	Gold	
2008	CRHK's Ultimate Song Chart Awards Presentation (叱咤樂壇流行榜)	Chik Chak Top Ten Single (叱咤十大專業推介第二位)	"Love Song"	Second place	
2008	CRHK's Ultimate Song Chart Awards Presentation (叱咤樂壇流行榜)	Chik Chak Producer/Singer (叱咤唱作人金獎)	—N/a	Gold	
2008	CRHK's Ultimate Song Chart Awards Presentation (叱咤樂壇流行榜)	Chik Chak Composer (叱咤作曲人大獎)	—N/a	Won	
2008	10th Mnet KM Music Festival	Best New Asian Artist	—N/a	Won	
2009	HITO Radio Music Awards (HITO流行音樂獎)	Top 10 Songs of the Year	"Love Song"	Won	
2009	HITO Radio Music Awards (HITO流行音樂獎)	Best Loved by Audience	"未來" (Future)	Won	
2009	Metro Radio Mandarin Hits Music Awards (新城國語力頒獎禮)	Male Artist	—N/a	Won	
2009	Metro Radio Mandarin Hits Music Awards (新城國語力頒獎禮)	Singer-Songwriter	—N/a	Won	
2009	Metro Radio Mandarin Hits Music Awards (新城國語力頒獎禮)	Radio Song	"If Love" ("如果愛")	Won	
2009	Metro Radio Mandarin Hits Music Awards (新城國語力頒獎禮)	Album	Orange Moon	Won	
2009	Metro Radio Music Awards (新城勁爆頒獎禮)	Male Artist	—N/a	Won	
2009	Metro Radio Music Awards (新城勁爆頒獎禮)	Singer-Songwriter	—N/a	Won	
2009	Metro Radio Music Awards (新城勁爆頒獎禮)	Fans Elected Artist	—N/a	Won	
2009	Metro Radio Music Awards (新城勁爆頒獎禮)	Popular Mandarin Song (勁爆國語歌曲)	"Red Bean"	Won	
2009	CRHK's Ultimate Song Chart Awards Presentation (叱咤樂壇流行榜)	Male Artist	—N/a	Bronze	
2009	CRHK's Ultimate Song Chart Awards Presentation (叱咤樂壇流行榜)	Best Music Arrangement	—N/a	Won	
2009	RTHK's Top Ten Chinese Songs Music Awards	Best Pop Singer	—N/a	Won	
2009	RTHK's Top Ten Chinese Songs Music Awards	Best Mandarin Pop Song	"Three Person Tour"	Won	
2010	CASH Golden Sail Music Awards	Best Performance	"Playful"	Won	
2010	Metro Radio Mandarin Hits Music Awards Presentation (新城國語力頒獎禮)	Best Male Artist	—N/a	Won	
2010	Metro Radio Mandarin Hits Music Awards Presentation (新城國語力頒獎禮)	Best Asia Singer-Songwriter	—N/a	Won	
2010	Metro Radio Music Awards (新城勁爆頒獎禮)	Best Hits Mandarin Song	"Playful"	Won	
2010	Metro Radio Music Awards (新城勁爆頒獎禮)	Best Composer	"Weakness" Kay Tse + "Earl Grey" by Shiga Lin	Won	
2010	Metro Radio Music Awards (新城勁爆頒獎禮)	Greater China Fan Chosen Best Hits Artist	—N/a	Won	
2010	CRHK's Ultimate Song Chart Awards Presentation (叱咤樂壇流行榜)	Ultimate Composer	—N/a	Won	
2010	RTHK's Top Ten Chinese Songs Music Awards (叱咤樂壇流行榜)	Best Composer	—N/a	Won	
2010	RTHK's Top Ten Chinese Songs Music Awards (叱咤樂壇流行榜)	Most Popular Artist	—N/a	Nominated	
2010	Yahoo! Asia Buzz Awards	Most Influential Hong Kong Male Artist in Asia	—N/a	Won	
2010	Yahoo! Asia Buzz Awards	Taiwan Most Popular HK Artist	—N/a	Won	
2010	Sina Music Awards	Top 20 Songs (二十大歌曲)	"Playful"	Won	
2010	Sina Music Awards	Favourite Singer-Songwriter	—N/a	Won	
2010	Sina Music Awards	Favourite Mandarin Song	"Coconut Shell"	Won	
2011	Metro Radio Mandarin Hits Music Awards (新城國語力頒獎禮)	Male Artist	—N/a	Won	
2011	Metro Radio Mandarin Hits Music Awards (新城國語力頒獎禮)	Best Asia Singer-Songwriter	—N/a	Won	
2011	Metro Radio Mandarin Hits Music Awards (新城國語力頒獎禮)	Song of the Year	"Finally"	Won	
2011	Metro Radio Music Awards (新城勁爆頒獎禮)	Best Composer	"Wallpaper"	Won	
2011	Metro Radio Music Awards (新城勁爆頒獎禮)	Best Album	15	Won	
2011	Metro Radio Music Awards (新城勁爆頒獎禮)	Male Artist	—N/a	Won	
2011	Metro Radio Music Awards (新城勁爆頒獎禮)	Best Mandarin Song	"If You Think"	Won	
2011	Yahoo! Asia Buzz Awards	Best Singer-Songwriter Song	"Finally"	Won	
2011	Yahoo! Asia Buzz Awards	Most Influential Hong Kong Male Artist in Asia	—N/a	Won	
2011	Yahoo! Asia Buzz Awards	Taiwan Most Popular HK Artist	—N/a	Won	
2011	Yahoo! Asia Buzz Awards	Taiwan Most Popular Duet	"If You Think" (Khalil Fong and Lala Hsu)	Won	
2011	CRHK's Ultimate Song Chart Awards Presentation (叱咤樂壇流行榜)	Ultimate Song	"Hao Bu Rong Yi"	Won	
2011	CRHK's Ultimate Song Chart Awards Presentation (叱咤樂壇流行榜)	Ultimate Singer-Songwriter	—N/a	Gold	
2011	CRHK's Ultimate Song Chart Awards Presentation (叱咤樂壇流行榜)	Ultimate Composer	—N/a	Won	
2011	CRHK's Ultimate Song Chart Awards Presentation (叱咤樂壇流行榜)	Ultimate Male Artist	—N/a	Silver	
2011	CRHK's Ultimate Song Chart Awards Presentation (叱咤樂壇流行榜)	Ultimate Album of the Year	15	Won	
2011	Sina Music Awards	Favourite Mandarin Song	"Finally"	Won	
2011	Sina Music Awards	Favourite Singer-Songwriter	—N/a	Won	
2011	Sina Music Awards	Top 20 Songs (二十大歌曲)	"Because of You"	Won	
2011	Sina Music Awards	Best Mandarin Duet Song	"Zi Yi Wei" (Khalil Fong and Lala Hsu)	Won	
2011	RTHK's Top Ten Chinese Songs Music Awards	Best Artist	—N/a	Won	
2011	RTHK's Top Ten Chinese Songs Music Awards	Best Mandarin Song (優秀流行國語歌曲獎)	"Hao Bu Rong Yi"	Bronze	
2011	RTHK's Top Ten Chinese Songs Music Awards	Best Chinese Song	"Hao Bu Rong Yi"	Won	
2012	Kugou Music Awards	Songwriter of the Year	—N/a	Won	
2012	Kugou Music Awards	Singer-Songwriter of the Year	—N/a	Won	
2012	Kugou Music Awards	HK/TW Singer of the Year	—N/a	Won	
2012	Sina Music Awards	Favorite Singer-Songerwriter	—N/a	Won	
2012	Sina Music Awards	Favorite Mandarin Song	"Close to You"	Won	
2012	Sina Music Awards	Album Concept	Back to Wonderland	Won	
2012	CRHK's Ultimate Song Chart Awards Presentation (叱咤樂壇流行榜)	Top 10 Songs of the Year	千紙鶴	Won	
2012	CRHK's Ultimate Song Chart Awards Presentation (叱咤樂壇流行榜)	Ultimate Male Artist	—N/a	Silver	
2012	CRHK's Ultimate Song Chart Awards Presentation (叱咤樂壇流行榜)	Ultimate Composer	—N/a	Won	
2012	RTHK's Top Ten Chinese Songs Music Awards	Best Artist	—N/a	Won	
2012	RTHK's Top Ten Chinese Songs Music Awards	Best Mandarin Song (優秀流行國語歌曲獎)	千紙鶴	Silver	
2012	RTHK's Top Ten Chinese Songs Music Awards	Best Chinese Song	千紙鶴	Won	
2013	RTHK's Top Ten Chinese Songs Music Awards	Best Mandarin Song (優秀流行國語歌曲獎)	愛立刻	Bronze	
2014	Hito Pop Music Awards	Hit FM's Singer-Songwriter	—N/a	Won	
2014	Hito Pop Music Awards	Hito Overseas Singer	—N/a	Won	
2014	Hito Pop Music Awards	Hito Arranger	"I Want You Back"	Won	
2014	CRHK's Ultimate Song Chart Awards Presentation (叱咤樂壇流行榜)	Ultimate Singer-Songwriter	—N/a	Bronze	
2015	Tencent x MTV Asia Music Gala 2016	Most Popular Male Singer in Hong Kong and Taiwan Award	—N/a	Won	
2016	Asia Artist Awards	New Wave	—N/a	Won	
2016	RTHK's Top Ten Chinese Songs Music Awards	Best Mandarin Song (優秀流行國語歌曲獎)	悟空	Bronze	
2017	28th Golden Melody Awards	Best Male Vocalist – Mandarin	Journey to the West	Won	
2017	CMIC Music Awards	Male Artist of the Year	Journey to the West	Won	
2017	CMIC Music Awards	Album of the Year	Journey to the West	Nominated	
2017	CMIC Music Awards	Song of the Year	"Wu Kong"	Nominated	
2017	CMIC Music Awards	Best Pop Performance	Journey to the West	Nominated	
2017	CMIC Music Awards	Best Arrangement	"Wu Kong"	Nominated	
2017	CMIC Music Awards	Best Recording	"Wu Kong"	Nominated	
2018	Freshasia Music Awards	Most Popular Artist (Hong Kong and Taiwan)	—N/a	Won	
2020	32nd Golden Melody Awards	Producer of the Year, Single	"Noodles"	Won	
