= Lala Hsu =

Taiwanese singer-songwriter (born 1984)

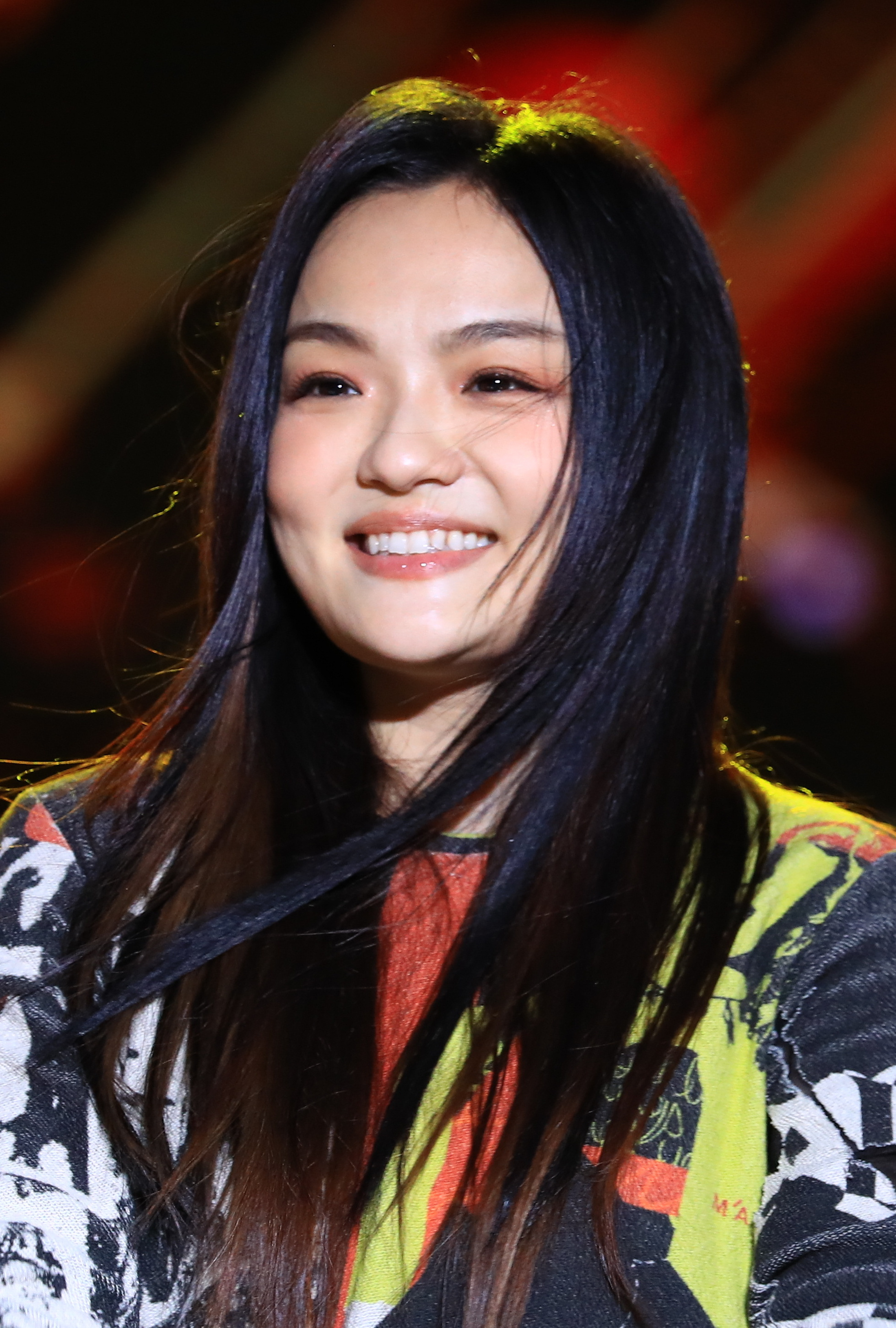
- Hsu in 2020
- Born: 20 December 1984 (age 41); Hualien County, Taiwan
- Education: Central Taiwan University of Science and Technology (BS)
- Occupation: Singer-songwriter
- Years active: 2008–present
- Spouse: Bill Chia (m. 2018)
- Children: 2
- Musical career
- Genre: Mandopop
- Instruments: Vocals; drum kit; guitar; piano
- Label: AsiaMuse (2009–present)

Chinese name
- Traditional Chinese: 徐佳瑩
- Simplified Chinese: 徐佳莹
Transcriptions
Standard Mandarin
- Hanyu Pinyin: Xú Jiāyíng
- Wade–Giles: Hsü^{2} Chia^{1}-ying^{2}
Southern Min
- Hokkien POJ: Chhî Ka-êng

Lala Hsu (traditional Chinese: 徐佳瑩; simplified Chinese: 徐佳莹; pinyin: Xú Jiāyíng; Pe̍h-ōe-jī: Chhî Ka-êng; born 20 December 1984) is a Taiwanese singer-songwriter. Hsu was born in Hualien County, Taiwan, and grew up in Taichung.

Hsu was a contestant in the third season of CTV's One Million Star in 2008. She won the contest with a self-composed and written song on 15 August of that year. She released her self-titled debut album on 29 May 2009. She has since published five albums to date; Lala Hsu in 2009, Limits in 2010, Ideal Life in 2012, Missing in 2014 and The Inner Me in 2017.

In 2010, Hsu won the Best New Artist award at the 21st Golden Melody Awards for her eponymously named album, Lala Hsu, becoming the first One Million Star alumni to win a Golden Melody Award. In 2015, she was nominated in six categories at the 26th Golden Melody Awards for the album Missing.

In 2016, Hsu was a participant of the fourth season of I Am a Singer which gained her wider attention in mainland China. A significant rise in popularity lead to numerous invitations to perform the theme songs of film and television works. In 2018, Hsu was named Best Mandarin Female Singer at the 29th Golden Melody Awards.

== Early life ==
Hsu's father is a retired ROC Air Force ground officer and her mother was a kindergarten teacher. She is the third child among her brothers and sisters. The singer worked as a nurse in Taichung Veterans General Hospital before her debut.

== Debut ==
Hsu won second place in a singing competition held by her high school. In junior college, she was the drummer and conductor of her school's Orchestra Club. She also served as an intern at the Affiliated Hospital of Chung Shan Medical College and worked in Taichung Veterans General Hospital. During university, Lala participated in the "Campus Golden Melody Award" competition, winning awards in the "Girl's Individual Singing Group" (singing award) and the "Semantic Creation Group" (creative award). She participated in four "Campus Golden Melody" compilations.

Hsu took part in the third season of One Million Star singing contest in 2008, and performed well. Hsu stated that her aim in participating the contest was to set up a "Starlight Chicken Restaurant" with the prize money, and she had already written a song for the restaurant. In the sixth episode, her performance of the song "Riding a White Horse" scored 25 points, making her the fastest contestant to reach the full score since the launch of One Million Star. On 15 August 2008, she won the finals with an average score of 21.47 points, paving the way for her to become a professional singer.

== Career ==
Hsu is the protégée of composer Su Tongda. "Riding a White Horse" was a collaboration between Hsu and Su, based on Xue Pinggui and Wang Baochuan.

On 29 May 2009, Hsu released her debut album Lala Hsu. The album was up for six awards at the 21st Golden Melody Awards. This include Song of the Year ("Riding a White Horse"), Best Mandarin Album (Lala Hsu), Best Composer (Hsu and Su Tongda, "Riding a White Horse"), Best New Artist, Best Arranger (Su Tongda, "Riding a White Horse") and Best Single Producer (Su Tongda, "Riding a White Horse").

On 26 June 2010, Hsu was awarded the Best New Artist at the 21st Golden Melody Awards. On 3 September of the same year, Hsu released her second studio album, Limits.

On 6 June 2012, she released her third studio album, Ideal Life. The album won several awards at home and abroad including the 2012 Top Ten Albums, and Albums and Singles of the Year at the Annual Association of Chinese Musicians Awards. In 2013, Hsu was nominated for Best Mandarin Female Singer for the first time at the 24th Golden Melody Awards.

On 13 June 2014, Hsu released her fourth Mandarin album Missing. On 21 March 2015, she held the "Total Eclipse" concert in Taipei Arena. It was her first concert in the Arena. In the same year, she was nominated for six awards at the 26th Golden Melody Awards, including Song of the Year, Best Mandarin Album, Best Mandarin Female Singer, Best Composer, Best Lyricist and Best Arranger.

In January 2016, she participated in the fourth season of Hunan TV I Am a Singer. Her performance of "Lost Desert" scored her first place in the first episode. Subsequently, she was invited to perform the theme songs for several film and television works. In July 2016, she held her "Total Eclipse" concert tour in Beijing, Shanghai and Shenzhen.

On 22 April 2017, Hsu debuted her "You Made My Day" concert tour at Taipei Arena. In May of the same year, she held the tour in Kaohsiung, Hong Kong, Shanghai and Malaysia. She released her fifth Mandarin studio album The Inner Me by the end of that year and received the Best Mandarin Album and Best Mandarin Female Singer at the 29th Golden Melody Awards the following year.

In January 2020, Hsu came back to participate in the eight and final season of Hunan TV's Singer and ended in fifth place. The following year, she participated with Harlem Yu in ETtoday's Jungle Voice 3 as principal instructors.

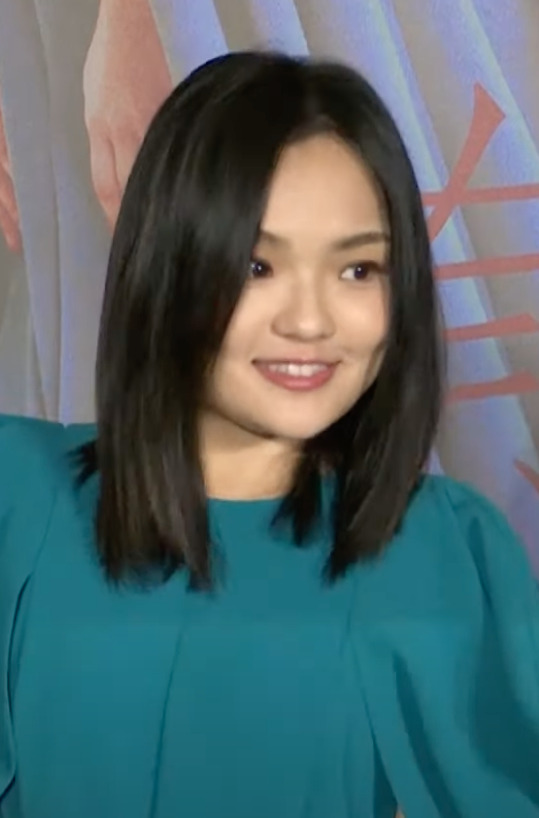
Hsu in July 2023

On 22 June 2022, Hsu released her sixth Mandarin studio album Gei.

== Musical style ==
Hsu's music is known for its subtle, unique narrative lyrical composition style, integrating elements of Taiwanese opera into her songs. Using the Mandarin language and the linguistic flexibility of Hokkien, the logic of the two different languages is put together naturally and smoothly. The rhythm of the main song is usually fast, while the chorus is mostly clear, lyrical, and easy to memorize. In the accompaniment and harmony, she tries to create a unique approach to chord progression, which is different than other pop music.

== Personal life ==
Hsu married Taiwanese director Bill Chia (Chinese: 比爾賈) in August 2018. They have one son (born on 6 December 2020) and one daughter (born on 17 December 2022).

== Discography ==
- Lala Hsu (2009)
- Limits (2010)
- Ideal Life (2012)
- Missing (2014)
- The Inner Me (2017)
- Gei (2022)

== Filmography ==
=== Films ===
Year	English Title	Chinese Title	Role	Notes
2011	Rio	里約大冒險	Jewel	Mandarin voice (Taiwanese release)
2014	Rio 2	里約大冒險2	Jewel	Mandarin voice (Taiwanese release)

=== Television series ===
Year	English Title	Chinese Title	Role	Network	Notes
2010	Days We Stared at the Sun	他們在畢業的前一天爆炸	Lala	PTS: PTS Main Channel	Cameo

=== Variety shows ===
Year	English Title	Chinese Title	Network	Notes
2008	One Million Star (season 3)	超級星光大道3	CTV: CTV Main Channel	
2008	One Million Star (season 4)	超級星光大道4	CTV: CTV Main Channel	Ep. 10
2009	One Million Star (season 5)	超級星光大道5	CTV: CTV Main Channel	Ep. 17
2010	One Million Star (season 6)	超級星光大道6	CTV: CTV Main Channel	Ep. 16
2016	I Am a Singer (season 4)	我是歌手（第四季）	HBS: Hunan Television	
2017	Singer 2017	歌手 2017	HBS: Hunan Television	Ep. 13
2017	One Night Food Trip – International Edition	吃貨48小時－國際篇	tvN Asia	
2020	Singer 2020	歌手·当打之年	HBS: Hunan Television	
2021	Jungle Voice	聲林之王	ETtoday	

== Awards and nominations ==
Year	Award	Category	Nomination	Result
2010	21st Golden Melody Awards	Song of the Year	"Riding A White Horse"	Nominated
2010	21st Golden Melody Awards	Best Composer	"Riding A White Horse"	Nominated
2010	21st Golden Melody Awards	Best Mandarin Album	Lala Hsu	Nominated
2010	21st Golden Melody Awards	Best New Artist	Lala Hsu	Won
2010	Association of Music Workers in Taiwan	Ten Best Songs	"Riding A White Horse"	Won
2012	Association of Music Workers in Taiwan	Ten Best Songs	"Under the Willow"	Won
2013	24th Golden Melody Awards	Best Mandarin Female Singer	Ideal Life	Nominated
2013	Association of Music Workers in Taiwan	Ten Best Songs	"Not That Hard"	Won
2013	Association of Music Workers in Taiwan	Ten Best Albums	Ideal Life	Won
2015	26th Golden Melody Awards	Song of the Year	"Missing"	Nominated
2015	26th Golden Melody Awards	Best Mandarin Album	Missing	Nominated
2015	26th Golden Melody Awards	Best Mandarin Female Singer	Missing	Nominated
2015	Association of Music Workers in Taiwan	Ten Best Songs	"Missing"	Won
2015	Association of Music Workers in Taiwan	Ten Best Albums	Missing	Won
2016	53rd Golden Horse Awards	Best Original Film Song	Big Fish & Begonia (Performer: "It's Cold Without Your Love")	Nominated
2017	Association of Music Workers in Taiwan	Ten Best Songs	"You Made My Day"	Won
2018	22nd China Music Awards	Song of the Year	"From Now On"	Won
2018	22nd China Music Awards	Most Popular Singer-songwriter	Lala Hsu	Won
2018	29th Golden Melody Awards	Album of the Year	The Inner Me	Nominated
2018	29th Golden Melody Awards	Best Mandarin Album	The Inner Me	Won
2018	29th Golden Melody Awards	Best Mandarin Female Singer	The Inner Me	Won
2018	Association of Music Workers in Taiwan	Ten Best Songs	"The Prayer"	Won
2018	Association of Music Workers in Taiwan	Ten Best Albums	The Inner Me	Won
2019	Association of Music Workers in Taiwan	Ten Best Songs	"Springtime Allergies"	Won
2022	33rd Golden Melody Awards	Song of the Year	"Prototype"	Nominated
2022	33rd Golden Melody Awards	Producer of the Year, Single	"None of the Above"	Won
2022	13th Golden Indie Music Awards	Best R&B Song	"Break Off"	Nominated
