= Jiahui Wu =

Malaysian singer (born 1981)

Wu Jiahui
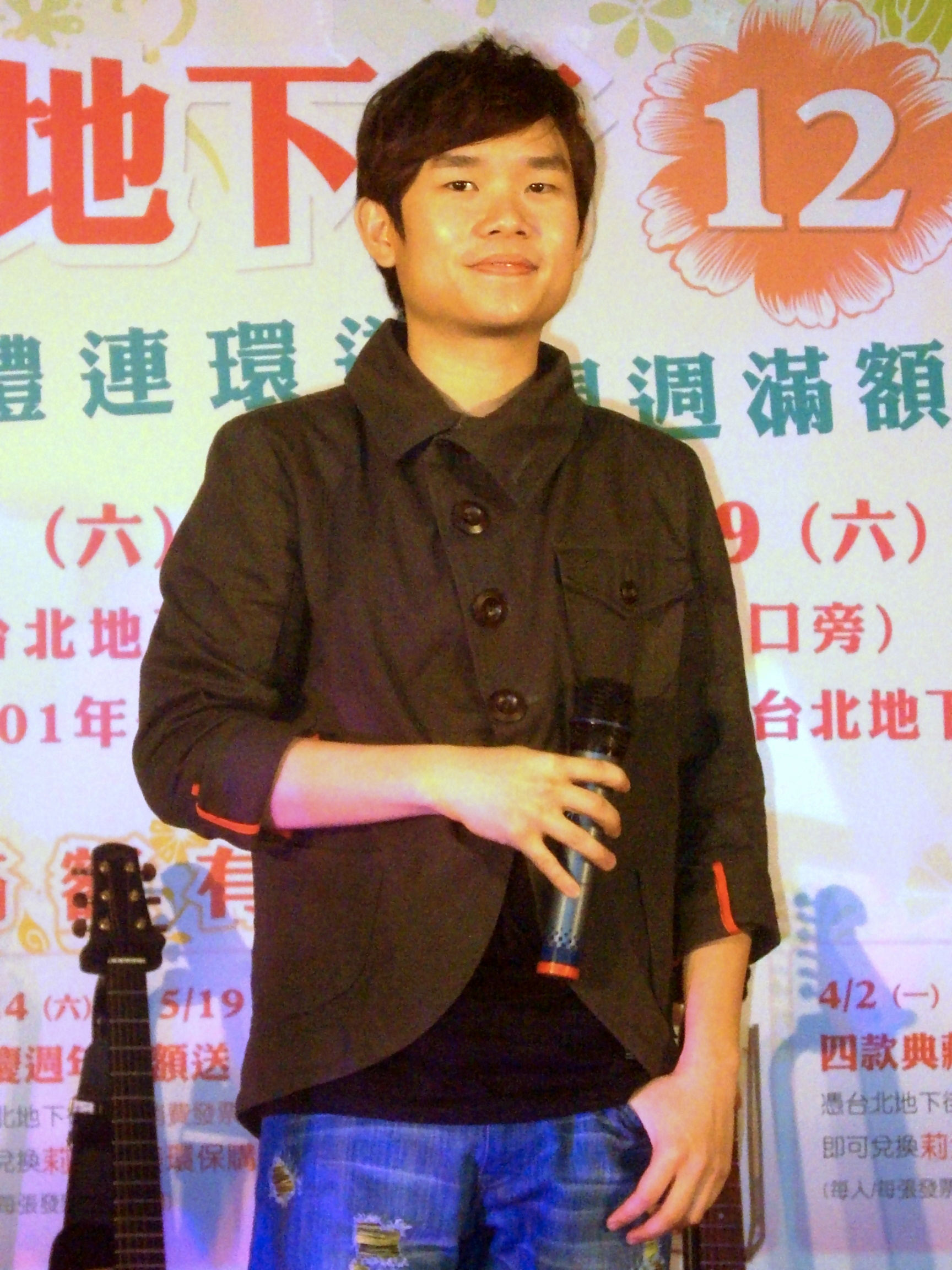
- Wu in 2012
- Born: 19 August 1981 (age 45); Penang, Malaysia
- Occupations: singer-songwriter and record producer
- Years active: 2002–present
- Spouse: Sherry Chen (m. 2019)

Jiahui Wu (Chinese: 伍家辉; born August 19, 1981) is a Malaysian singer, songwriter, and producer. He is an exclusive writer at Warner/Chappell Music.

== Career ==
=== Early career ===
Wu started writing songs in middle school and began performing in music restaurants at the age of 15. Two years later, he joined the famous Malaysian songwriting group “Qingguangchang - Gengmenggongzuofang 青廣場 - 耕夢工作坊". At that time, he wrote his first song “Xing Zhi Wu Yu 星之物語" with his friend Haiwei Chen. The song didn’t win an award in the national competition, so the two revised the song. In 2002, Warner Music found potential in their work and signed Wu as an exclusive writer. The song was later awarded “Top 10 Original Singles" and "Best Original Song (local)” at the 8th Malaysia PWH Music Award. Moreover, it’s been released as the main hit “Yi Gong Chi 一公尺” in Jerry Yan’s first album.

=== Songwriter and producer ===
In 2003, Wu’s work “Ventriloquism 腹語術" was recognized by three prominent singers at the same time: Jacky Cheung, Faye Wong, and Karen Mok. It was finally published in Karen Mok’s "X" album, as the first song Wu officially published. Since then, Wu has released numerous songs in various singers’ albums. In 2004, Jacky Cheung selected his song “Black and White ⿊⽩畫映" in the album "Black&White Collection”. It serves as another milestone in Wu's songwriting career.

His published works include Andy Lau's “Yi Kuai Qian 壹塊錢", Stefanie Sun's “Wish you Happiness 祝你開心", “Needing You 需要你", Karen Mok’s “Yi Kou Yi Kou 一口一口", “Buo He 薄荷", Tanya Chua’s “Cheng Ai 塵埃", Matilda Tao’s “Shui Wan Wan 水灣灣", Claire Kuo's “Bu Shuo 不說”, Amber Kuo’s “Love & Love”, Nicholas Teo’s “Ping Jing Qu 平靜曲”, etc. He has worked with singers such as Nicholas Tse, Michelle Vickie, Leon Lai, Gigi Leung, Elva Hsiao, Momo Wu, Rainie Yang, Waa Wei, Kit Chan, Julia Peng, etc.

=== Singer ===
Wu's demo “Sui Ran Wo Yuan Yi 雖然我願意” has left a strong impression to Eric Ng, a well-known producer in the Chinese music industry that Ng rushed from Singapore to Penang, Malaysia to meet with Wu. After the two talked, Ng appreciates the talent and elegant voice of Wu, and was impressed by his passion for music, on top of his ambitions, dreams, and the humble attitude to learn. Ng decided to offer a singer contract to him, leaving Jonathan Lee with regrets that he wasn’t fast enough to sign Wu for his talents and unique voice.

In 2007, Wu and his friend Shuo Hsiao co-wrote and sang “Ai! Ai 唉! 愛”, a song widely discussed among fans in Taiwan. In early 2008, Wu published one of his most well-known pieces, “Yi Ren Yi Ban 一人一半”, serving as the theme song for the popular Singaporean movie "881". The song stayed on the charts for 15 weeks, and ranked second place on the Singapore radio “YES93.3 Pop Radio Charts". The same year in April, Wu released his first solo album “Sui Ran Wo Yuan Yi 雖然我願意” in Singapore, and sold 3,000 copies in Singapore in just a month.

In 2009, Wu officially released his album in Taiwan, “I Crazy You 我瘋你", and went on the concert tour "88 LIVE”, performing on school campuses and in live houses. He completed 88 live performances in five months, and completed the 101st performance in 2010.

In October 2011, Wu released a mini-album “Ni Ai Wo Ma 妳愛我嗎" in his hometown, Malaysia. The album was later released in Taiwan and other Asian countries. This album has been awarded in the Global Chinese Music Awards and Malaysia PWH Music Awards.

=== Entrepreneur ===
In 2012, Wu established his own music production studio "Dreammy Studio" in Malaysia, and won the award of “Outstanding Singer in Malaysia” in the 2012 Global Chinese Music Awards. In 2013, he released an album under his own music brand Dreammy Studio, “Jiahui Wu x Cheryl Lee - THE IMPRESSOUL 01”, in which he and Cheryl Lee collaborated with each other in songwriting.

In 2014, Wu established "SmallBox Music", a music company that manages music production and copyrights of songs. The company signs and cultivates talents for songwriting, arranging and production. In the recent years, the company has published works of many singers, including Jane Zhang, Della, FansiR, Janice M. Vidal, Victor Wong, Nicholas Teo, Z Chen, Priscilla Abby, etc. Many songs were also written to be the theme songs of TV shows or movies, and they were nominated as the "Best Chinese Soundtrack" at the 2020 AIM Chinese Music Awards.

== Artistry ==
When working on a production case, Wu will try to understand the singer and create a stronger bond with each other. Malaysian singer Jyin Poh once shared that she feels that Wu is like a comedian, because he would perform magic tricks, and fool around by changing the lyrics to imitate Andy Lau and Aaron Kwok. Despite his many humorous actions, Wu is very rigorous at work. He gives singers a lot of freedom, and encourages them to let go of their self-doubt. He would inspire the singers and remind them of the original happiness and passion they have for music.

== Personal life ==
At the end of 2019, Wu announced his marriage with the Malaysian singer Sherry Chen on his social media. They were wearing rings to show a successful marriage proposal. The couple registered as husband and wife in 2020.

== Albums ==
=== 2008 ===
《雖然我願意》（CD+DVD）（Released in Malaysia and Singapore）──2008, 4/14

=== 2009 ===
《我瘋你》（CD）──2009, 12/25

Single CD [Black & White] Collection

=== 2011 ===
《你愛我嗎？》（CD）──2011, 10/18

=== 2013 ===
《The Impressoul 01》（CD）──2013, 6/3

== Songwriting ==
- Jiahui Wu - 舞（Composer）

=== 2003 ===
- Karen Mok - 腹語術（Composer）

=== 2004 ===
- Jerry Yan - 一公尺（Composer）
- Stefanie Sun - 祝你開心（Lyricist, Composer）
- Jacky Chueng - 黑白畫映（Lyricist, Composer）
- Wallace Huo - 指甲上的花（Composer）

- Jiahui Wu - 擁抱（Composer）
- Nicholas Tse - 我沒有（Composer）
- Michelle Vickie - 你不在（Composer, Lyricist）

=== 2005 ===
- Leon Lai - 有情郎（Composer, Lyricist）
- Rynn Lim - 燦爛部屋（Composer, Lyricist）
- Matilda Tao - 水灣灣（Composer, Lyricist）
- Tanya Chua - 塵埃（Composer, Lyricist）
- 宗翔, Sean, 李沛旭, 余秉諺 - 一分鐘（Composer, Lyricist）

- Comic Boyz - 愛情不用翻譯（Composer）
- Comic Boyz - 好奇無上限（Composer）
- 何靜萱 - 這就是（Composer, Lyricist）
- 劉耔彤 - 我真不習慣（Composer, Lyricist）

=== 2006 ===
- Gigi Leung - 謝謝你這些日子（Composer）
- Gigi Leung - 白日夢（Composer）

- Karen Mok - 一口一口（Composer）
- Karen Mok - 薄荷（Composer）

=== 2007 ===
- Stefanie Sun - 需要你（Composer, Lyricist）
- Vic Chou - 愛上這世界（Composer）
- Joey Yung - 沒關係（Composer）

- Andy Lau - 壹塊錢（Composer）
- Ivy Hsu feat. JR - 想你日記（Composer, Lyricist）
- 2女 - 想你日記（Composer）

=== 2008 ===
- 袁泉 - 等（Composer）

- Jing Wong - 懶（Composer）

=== 2009 ===
- Jiahui Wu - 雖然我願意（Lyricist, Composer）
- Jiahui Wu - 我瘋你（Lyricist, Composer）
- Jiahui Wu - 一個人白頭（Lyricist, Composer）
- Jiahui Wu - 肚子餓了（Lyricist, Composer）
- Jiahui Wu - 要你說愛我（Lyricist, Composer）
- Jiahui Wu - 童話傻瓜（Lyricist, Composer）
- Jiahui Wu - 遠距離（Lyricist, Composer）
- Nicholas Teo - 平靜Composer（Composer, Lyricist）

- Jing Wong - 我會一直記得（Composer）
- Jing Wong - 心碎雨（Composer, Lyricist）
- 陳家凱 - 飛行943（Composer, Lyricist）
- Amber Kuo - Love&Love（Composer）
- Claire Kuo - 不說（Composer, Lyricist）
- Where Chou - 難題（Composer, Lyricist）
- Shuo Hsiaofeat. Jiahui Wu －Long D.遠距離戀愛（Composer, Lyricist）

=== 2010 ===
- AK - 愛我嗎（Composer）
- Cheryl Yi - 該怎麼愛（Composer, Lyricist）

- Lara - 我不再怕（Composer）
- Jaycee Fong - 兩個人（Lyricist）

=== 2011 ===
- Jiahui Wu- Love（寂寞版）（Composer）
- Jiahui Wu - 你愛我嗎？（Composer）
- Jiahui Wu - 若（Composer, Lyricist）
- Jiahui Wu- 腦袋（Composer）
- Jiahui Wu - 很自己（Lyricist）
- Jiahui Wu - 我們怎麼Love（Composer）

- Denise Ho - 花花（粵）（Composer）
- Nicholas Teo - 不多（Composer）
- Jess Lee - 離場（Composer）
- Elva Hsiao - 餘溫（Composer, Lyricist）
- Stefanie Sun - 空口言（Composer, Lyricist）
- 許亮宇 - 光影（Composer）

=== 2012 ===
- Jiahui Wu - 灰（Composer）
- Denise Ho - 花花（Composer）
- 陳偉聯 - 念念不忘（Composer）
- Eve Ai - 學會了（Composer）
- Amber Kuo - 還愛着你（Composer, Lyricist）
- Amber Kuo - 灌溉愛（Composer, Lyricist）

- Tiger Huang - 該放手了（Composer）
- 楊雁雁, 吳天瑜 - 香火（Composer, Lyricist）
- Peter Pan - 玩具（Composer）
- Peter Pan - 康復（Composer）
- Jason Wang - 男人與男孩（Composer, Lyricist）
- Cindy Chen - 我相信（Composer）

=== 2013 ===
- Jiahui Wu - 纏（Composer）
- Jiahui Wu - 愛在心裡 （Lyricist, Composer）
- Jiahui Wu - Be Yours Be Mine（Composer）
- Jiahui Wu, Cheryl Yi - 分手有理（Composer）
- Jiahui Wu, Cheryl Yi - 不說你不懂（Composer）
- Diana Wang - 有點不捨（Composer, Lyricist）
- Cheryl Yi - 不想聽（Composer）

- Cheryl Yi - 無力（Composer）
- Aska Yang - 無常（Composer, Lyricist）
- Nicole Lai - 我不像他（Composer, Producer）
- Nicole Lai - 你沒有比我愛你（Composer, Producer）
- 葉俊亨 - 孤獨便利店（Composer, Lyricist）
- 丁衣凡 - 美好天邊（Lyricist, Composer）
- 丁丁 - 寂寞很重（Composer, Lyricist）

=== 2014 ===
- Momo Wu - 没差（Lyricist, Composer）
- Stefanie Sun - 銀泰（Composer）

- 管罄 - 強迫症（Lyricist, Composer）
- Jess Lee - 忍不住想念（Composer）

=== 2015 ===
- 陳柏宇 - 宇季（Composer）
- Amber Kuo - 愛人呢（Lyricist, Composer）

- Kit Chan - 終於（Composer）

=== 2016 ===
- Rainie Yang - 點一盞無聊的小夜燈（Composer）

=== 2017 ===
- 車志立- 一人（LyricistComposer）
- Jiahui Wu - 不懂爱 《心门》

=== 2019 ===
Waa Wei- 竊笑（Composer）

=== 2021 ===
- Greg Han - 獨角獸（Composer）
- Roy Luo feat. F.I.R. - 人生這一杯（Lyricist, Composer）

== Awards ==
Year	Award	Song
2004	4th Global Chinese Music Awards Top 20 Singles of the Year || Nicholas Tse《Wo Mei Yo 我沒有》	
2004	8th Malaysia PWH Music Awards Top Ten Singles (local) || Jerry Yan《Yi Gong Chi 一公尺》	
2004	Malaysia - Best Original Song	Jerry Yan《Yi Gong Chi 一公尺》
2006	9th Malaysia PWH Music Awards Top Ten International Singles || Jacky Cheung《Black and White 黑白畫映》	
2007	MACP - Best Potential New Artist	
2008	Singapore Golden Melody Awards Best New Artist ||	
2008	10th Malaysia PWH Music Awards New Artist - Silver ||	
2008	10th Malaysia PWH Music Awards Top Ten Singles (local)|| Wu Jiahui《Sui Ran Wo Yuan Yi 雖然我願意》	
2009	Malaysia RED Box Top 20 KTV Singles of the Year || Wu Jiahui《Sui Ran Wo Yuan Yi 雖然我願意》	
2009	Singapore eMusic Awards Best Composer (local) || Wu Jiahui《Sui Ran Wo Yuan Yi 雖然我願意》	
2009	Malaysia DiDaDee Awards Top Ten Singles || Wu Jiahui《Sui Ran Wo Yuan Yi 雖然我願意》	
2009	Malaysia DiDaDee Awards Singer Songwriter - Bronze ||	
