= Wen Yin Liang =

Taiwanese singer (born 1987)

Wen Yin Liang 梁文音
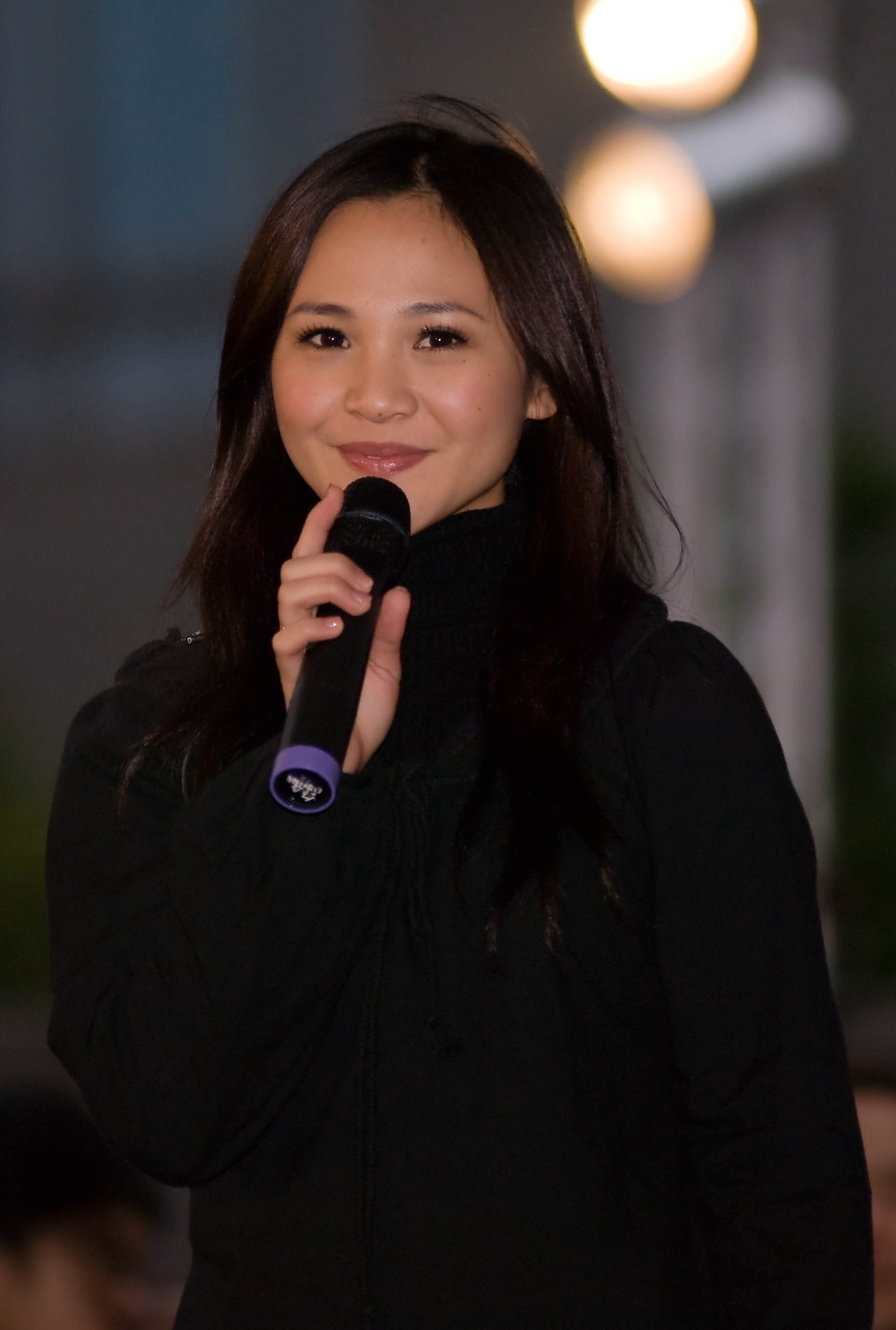
- Liang in 2007

Background information
- Also known as: Leheane Palray
- Born: 8 April 1987 (age 39); Maolin, Kaohsiung, Taiwan
- Occupation: Singer
- Label: Universal Music Taiwan
- Spouse: Chang Nien-ping (m. 2016; div. 2020)

Chinese name
- Traditional Chinese: 梁文音
Transcriptions
Standard Mandarin
- Hanyu Pinyin: Liáng Wényīn
Hakka
- Pha̍k-fa-sṳ: Liòng Vùn-yîm
Southern Min
- Hokkien POJ: Niû Bûn-im

Wen Yin Liang (Chinese: 梁文音; pinyin: Liáng Wényīn, Rukai: Leheane Palray; or Rachel Liang born 8 April 1987) is a Taiwanese Mandopop singer.

== Early life ==
Liang was born in Maolin, Kaohsiung on 8 April 1987. She is of Rukai and Tayal descent. Her parents died when she was young. At 13, she and her younger brother entered Christian Mountain Children's Home, while her older sister works and studies.

In 2006, she entered and won the Princess Baleng singing competition held by the variety show Blackie's Teenage Club. This earned her the nickname "Princess Baleng". Afterwards, she joined the cast of the show briefly.

In 2007, she entered episode 20 of the first season of One Million Star, which featured a PK-style singing battle, as a challenger. She competed against Peter Pan and won. The good result prompted her to enter the second season as a contestant. She finished in second place.

== Collaborations ==
- "Forgotten Happiness" (幸福的忘記) (2013) with Eric Suen from his 11th Mandarin studio album Love.. Actually as well from her first EP Don't Wanna Be Friends After Breakup.

== Controversy ==
In 2013, when the petition-initiated bill to revise the Civil Code to allow for same-sex couples to marry was introduced, a protest was held on Ketagalan Boulevard on 30 November. In an interview after a Christian concert in America, Liang explained her absence from the protest and made certain comments that were considered discriminatory by netizens, particularly her comments that "her homosexual friends...need to be restored by God."

She has indicated multiple times throughout the years that her comments were misunderstood. In June 2020, she explain her comments and the controversy in an exclusive interview.

== Personal life ==
Liang is Christian. In 2016, she married Chang Nien-ping, a missionary. They divorced in 2020.

== Discography ==
Release order	Data	Tracks
1st	《Love Poems (愛的詩篇)》: Issue date: 12 December 2008; Record label: Universal Music; Language:Mandarin	Tracks: 1. The most happy thing (最幸福的事); 2. Mint and nails cut (薄荷與指甲剪); 3. Snow rain (雪雨); 4. Overtones (弦外之音); 5. Can't love (可以不愛了); 6. I'm not as brave as you think (我不是你想像那麼勇敢); 7. Dearest (movie [he actually didn't so like you] chinese theme song) (最親愛的); 8. At first glance ([eastern sen] shopping image advertising song) (第一眼); 9. Dry Your Eyes; 10. Love Poem (Rainbow tranquility) theme song (愛的詩篇)
2nd	《Love Will Always Be Here (愛，一直存在)》: Issue date: 20 November 2009; Record label: Universal Music; Language: Mandarin	Tracks: 1. Cry on good (哭過就好了); 2. Dearest is me (親愛的是我); 3. Full (滿滿); 4. Biting cat (咬人貓); 5. Sixth sense (第六感); 6. Three Wishes (三個願望); 7. Love Will Always Be Here (愛，一直存在); 8. Most (最最); 9. Small eyes magnifying glass (小眼睛放大鏡); 10. Long after long (很久很久以後); 11. Land of milk and honey (奶與蜜之地)
3rd	《Lover & Friend (情人×知己)》: Issue date: 29 April 2011; Record label: Universal Music; Language: Mandarin	Tracks: 1. Lover Confident (情人知己); 2. 1 Million Kisses (一百萬種親吻); 3. Happy Holiday; 4. Can't stand (受不了); 5. We don't cry (我們都別哭); 6. Children (孩子); 7. Sister amoy (姊妹淘); 8. Enough Happiness (夠幸福了); 9. Forgotten angels (遺忘天使); 10. Still friends (還是朋友)
4th	《Yellow Jacket (黃色夾克)》: Issue date: 4 January 2013; Record label: Universal Music; Language: Mandarin	Tracks: 1. Yellow Jacket (黃色夾克); 2. I Must Will Fall In Love With You (我一定會愛上你); 3. Heart Of The Child (心裡的孩子); 4. Oh baby 5. Slow is grew up (慢一點長大); 6. Wants to stray of fish (想流浪的魚); 7. Adam's apple (亞當蘋果); 8. Moonlight carpet (月光地毯); 9. What is love (愛是什麼); 10. Why you're so happy (你為什麼那麼快樂)
5th	《Diffuse Love Songs (漫情歌)》: Issue date: 9 October 2014; Record label: Universal Music; Language: Mandarin	Tracks: 1. Diffuse love songs (漫情歌); 2. Loneliness of light (寂寞之光); 3. Love is actually cruel (愛其實很殘忍); 4. Off took of rhythm (掉拍的節奏); 5. Live in heart of passing (住在心裡的過客); 6. Each a times love (每一次戀愛); 7. Lovers friends (戀人朋友); 8. Broke up how don't do friends (分手後不要做朋友); 9. Left us happy (幸福離開了我們); 10. We will meet again (我們會再見); 11. Rukai girl (魯凱的姑娘)
6th	《The View From the Passenger (副駕駛座的風景)》: Issue date: 18 May 2018; Record label: Universal Music; Language: Mandarin	Tracks: 1. Like A Song (如歌); 2. Sensible (懂事); 3. Turning Point (轉折); 4. The View From the Passenger (副駕駛座的風景); 5. Bad Girl (乖乖壞女孩); 6. Peaceful Breakup (和平分手) (feat. Ricky Hsiao); 7. Fine (還好); 8. To The Self of That Year (給那年的自己); 9. The Hands That Saw (那雙看見的手); 10. Meet By Chance (不期而遇); 11. Reduction (還原); 12. Natural Color (自然的顏色); 13. Broke up how don't do friends 2016 (分手後不要做朋友2016)
7th	《Treat Her Well (好好對待她)》: Issue date: 14 October 2022; Record label: Universal Music; Language: Mandarin	Tracks: 1. You are a liar (你是說謊的人); 2. Can You Be Happy (還能幸福嗎); 3. Two-Half (二分之二); 4. Be Yourself (宜自己); 5. Treat Her Well (好好對待她); 6. Tsunami Bar (海嘯吧); 7. Chasing Clouds (追浮雲的人); 8. Love is promising (愛有為); 9. Have nothing to say (沒什麼好說的); 10. Reflection (倒影); 11. You exist (你存在)
