= One Million Star season 6 =

Season of television program

One Million Star
- Season 6
- Starring: Coaches: Yuan Wei Jen (袁惟仁); Phil Chang (張宇); Zuo Anan (左安安); Adam Kan (康康); Judges: Kay Huang (黃韻玲); Tiger Huang (黃小琥); David Wong (黃大煒); Roger Cheng (鄭建國)
- No. of episodes: 27

Release
- Original network: CTV
- Original release: November 6, 2009 – May 14, 2010

The sixth season of One Million Star, a Taiwanese televised singing competition, began on November 6, 2009. Similar to previous seasons, the competition started with 100 participants, and most of the contents and rules remained unchanged. Altogether 27 episodes were aired.

== Teams ==
Color key

- Winner
- Runner-up
- Third place
- Fourth place
- Fifth place
- Eliminated in the Championships
- Eliminated in the Challenge rounds
- Eliminated in the Regular competitions
- Eliminated in the Scrimmaging rounds
- Withdrew

== The Scrimmaging Rounds ==
The Scrimmaging Rounds aired on 20, 27 November 2009 and 4, 11, 18, 25 December 2009.

=== Week 1: Team Phil VS. Team John (20 November) ===
Episode	Coach	Order	Artist	Song	Scores	Result
Episode 3 (20 November)	Phil Chang	1	Wang Xiao 王虓	用心良苦/張宇	17	
Episode 3 (20 November)	Yuan Wei Jen	1	Shi Junli 石君立	愛情傀儡/巫啟賢	15	
Episode 3 (20 November)	Phil Chang	2	Fu Yuting 傅郁庭	想起/江美琪	16	
Episode 3 (20 November)	Yuan Wei Jen	2	Wang Yujun 王宇君; Liu Yanhan 劉彥含	執迷不悔/王菲	13	
Episode 3 (20 November)	Phil Chang	3	Chen Manqing 陳曼青; Yang Meizi 楊梅子	Don't Stop/蔡依林	17	
Episode 3 (20 November)	Yuan Wei Jen	3	Jian Yinhui 簡吟卉; Wang Qianhua 王芊樺	睜一隻眼閉一隻眼/蔡依林	13	
Episode 3 (20 November)	Phil Chang	4	Non Non Ma 馬靚辳; Zhang Shitang 張士堂	"Way Back Into Love"	18	
Episode 3 (20 November)	Yuan Wei Jen	4	Lin Menghua 林孟樺; Chen Tingjun 陳庭筠	不能跟情人說的話/劉若英 范瑋琪	13	
Episode 3 (20 November)	Phil Chang	5	Guo Yanxun 郭諺勳; Zhu Shengsong 朱省松	把妹/張震嶽	16	
Episode 3 (20 November)	Yuan Wei Jen	5	Nick Chung 鍾盛忠; Chen Pintong 沈品彤	愛情/張智成 江美琪	17	
Episode 3 (20 November)	Phil Chang	6	Chen Yi'en 陳以恩; Wu Beiya 吳蓓雅	阿嬤的白頭鬃/自創曲	23	
Episode 3 (20 November)	Yuan Wei Jen	6	Huang Shuyi 黃淑怡; Gary Tseng 曾治豪	我心動了/順子 阿Ben	15	
Episode 3 (20 November)	Phil Chang	7	Wu Siyao 吳思瑤	"Superstar"	19	
Episode 3 (20 November)	Yuan Wei Jen	7	Jenny Du 杜華瑾	一千年以後/林俊傑	20	
Episode 3 (20 November)	Phil Chang	8	Su Zhiyu 蘇芷妤	入戲/曹格	20	
Episode 3 (20 November)	Yuan Wei Jen	8	Li Huiqing 李匯晴	我要的自由/自創曲	16	

== The Regular Rounds ==
=== Week 1: Top 30 () ===
The Top 30 was aired on Friday, 1 January 2010. Yuan Wei Jen, Kay Huang, Tiger Huang, Anan Zuo and Roger Cheng become the judges in this round. Each artist performed one song which is their "sure-win" choice. For those got 15 marks or above will be advanced to the next round. Otherwise, the failure area should be seated. With the original planning, four artists will be eliminated. After the consideration of the judges, with six leaving the competition. The remaining 25 artists will then move on the next round.

Episode	Order	Artist	Song	Score	Result
	1	簡吟卉	水藍色眼淚/張惠妹	15	Advanced
	2	鍾盛忠	江南/林俊傑	15	Advanced
	3	劉康祥	愛情乞丐/卓義峰	15	Advanced
	4	王虓	心如刀割/張學友	15	Advanced
	5	鍾維憶	不公平/蕭賀碩	12	Failure
	6	Fu Yuting 傅郁庭	"別問我愛誰"	11	Eliminated
	7	謝曉恩	"愛什麼稀罕"	11	Eliminated
	8	范安婷	我不愛/孫燕姿	15	Advanced
	9	陳曼青	離人/林志炫	14	Failure
	10	曾治豪	藍雨/張學友	20	Advanced
	11	陳瑋婷	對的人/戴愛玲	17	Advanced
	12	馬靚辳	Yes or No/張惠妹	15	Advanced
	13	吳蓓雅	"Only One"	11	Eliminated
	14	黃裕文	"唯一"	10	Eliminated
	15	黃淑怡	我要快樂/張惠妹	12	Failure
	16	馮力俠	證據/楊乃文	14	Failure
	17	邊品憲	告別的時代/信	18	Advanced
	18	沈品彤	想念你的歌/Saya	15	Advanced
	19	黃郁善	香奈兒/王菲	17	Advanced
	20	黃偉晉	寂寞考/盧廣仲	14	Failure
	21	方琳	今晚你想念的人是不是我/A-Lin	14	Failure
	22	張士堂	情願/張學友	20	Advanced
	23	陳以恩	Self/陳綺貞	12	Failure
	24	盧棋	"奮不顧身"	10	Eliminated
	25	林思涵	好膽你就來/張惠妹	13	Failure
	26	林孟樺	"傻孩子"	11	Eliminated
	27	杜華瑾	High High High/張惠妹	16	Advanced
	28	蔣一帆 李廣博 牟少帥	流水年華/庾澄慶	18	Advanced
	29	蘇芷妤	愛到底/庾澄慶	17	Advanced
	30	李匯晴	眼淚/范曉萱	14	Failure
	31	胡夏	囚鳥/彭羚	22	Advanced
