= Wang Zheng =

Wang Zheng may refer to:

- Wang Zheng (singer) (born 1985), female Chinese pop singer
- Wang Zheng (hammer thrower) (born 1987), female Chinese hammer thrower
- Wang Zheng (sport shooter) (born 1979), male Chinese sport shooter
- Wang Zheng (newsreader), (born 1979), female Chinese newsreader
- Wang Zheng (pilot) (born 1972), the first Chinese pilot to fly solo around the world
- Wang Zheng (vice admiral) (1961–2026), a vice admiral of the People's Liberation Army Navy.

== See also ==
- Wang Zhen (disambiguation)
