= Wang Chen =

Wang Chen may refer to:

- Wang Chen (Three Kingdoms) (died 266), Cao Wei official
- Wang Chen (politician) (born 1950), People's Republic of China politician
- Wang Chen (physician) (born 1962), Chinese pulmonologist

== Sportspeople ==
- Wang Chen (table tennis) (born 1974), Chinese female table tennis player representing the United States
- Wang Chen (badminton) (born 1976), Chinese female badminton player representing Hong Kong
- Wang Chen (figure skater) (born 1986), Chinese male ice dancer
- Wang Chen (volleyball) (born 1987), Chinese volleyball player
- Wang Chen (high jumper) (born 1990), Chinese high jumper

== See also ==
- Wang Zhen (disambiguation), spelled Wang Chen in Wade–Giles
