= Chang Chin-lan (actress) =

Taiwanese actress

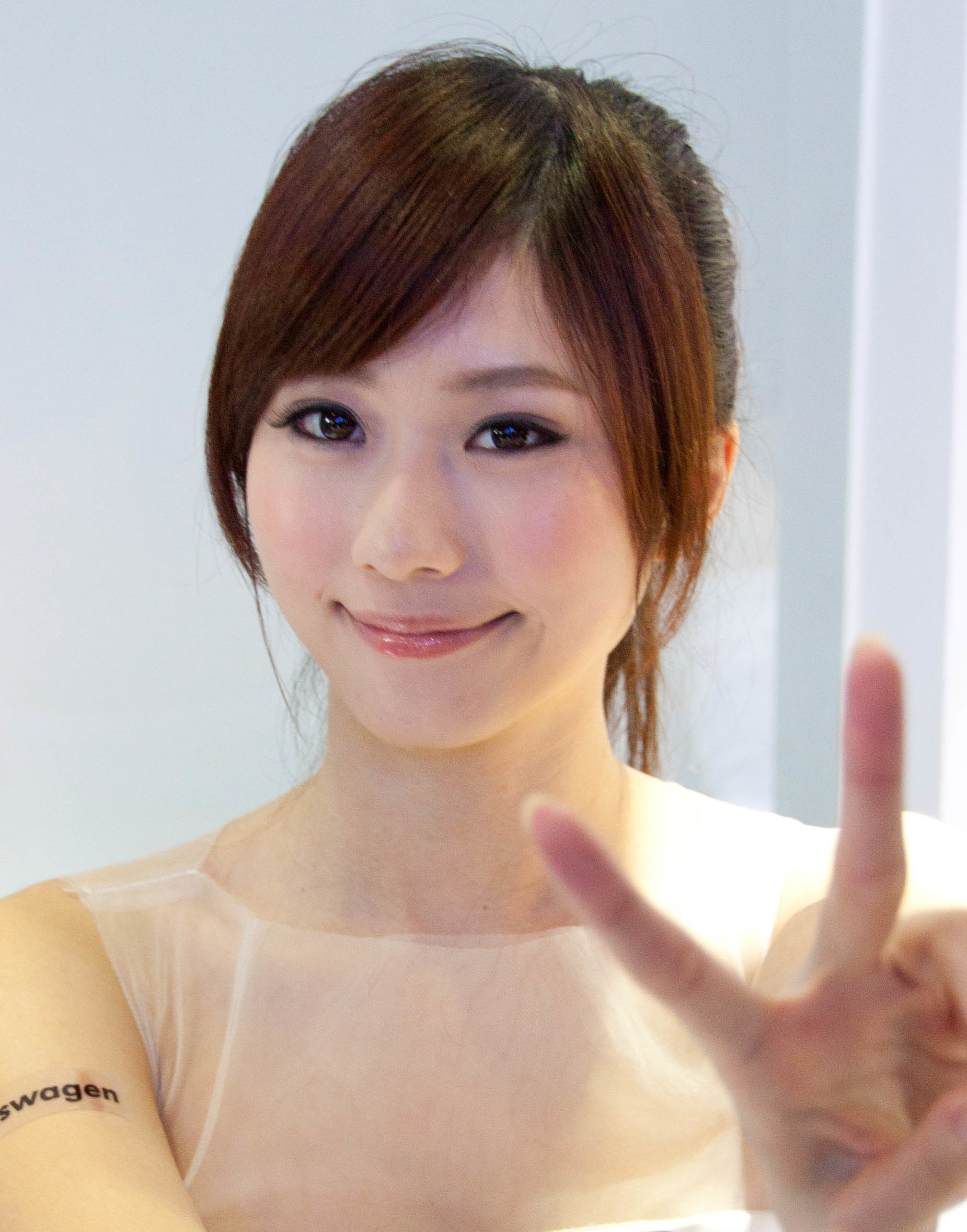
- Chang in 2012
- Born: 3 September 1988 (age 37); Taipei, Taiwan
- Occupation: Actress

Chinese name
- Traditional Chinese: 張景嵐
- Simplified Chinese: 张景岚
Transcriptions
Standard Mandarin
- Hanyu Pinyin: Zhāng Jǐnglán

Chang Chin-lan (Chinese: 張景嵐; pinyin: Zhāng Jǐnglán) is a Taiwanese actress.

== Early life and career ==
Chang studied industrial design at National Taiwan University of Arts.

In 2010, she entered a beauty pageant and ended up being signed by EeLin Entertainment as a model. From 2010 to 2011, she appeared on the political sketch show Celebrity Imitated Show as a background model.

In 2013, she guest hosted the variety show Hot Door Night with Jacky Wu and Lulu.

== Filmography ==
=== Film ===
Year	English title	Original title	Role	Notes
2014	My Geeky Nerdy Buddies	大宅男	A-mei	
2018	Let's Cheat Together	市長夫人的秘密	Hsiao-hsiao	
2019	Onstage Appearance	隨片登台	Fox spirit	

=== Television series ===
Year	English title	Original title	Role	Notes
2012	In Between	半熟戀人	A Tzu	
2012	PM10-AM03	PM10-AM03	Hsiao Ching	
2013	The Queen!	女王的誕生	Wang Na	
2013	PMAM	PMAM	Hsiao Ching	
2014	Say I Love You	勇敢說出我愛你	Guo Qiao Fei	
2015	Yes Man	事事達人	Chang Hsueh-ling	
2015	PMAM - Club Desire	PMAM之慾望俱樂部	Hsiao Ching	
2016	Love By Design	必勝練習生	Li Shu Zhen	
2016	Brides Married Here	新娘嫁到	Sung Hsiao-ping	
2016	Golden Darling	原來1家人	Brownie / Yen Ju Hua	
2017	Running Man	逃婚100次	Shen Jia-yi	
2017	Struggling Girls	野模	Wu Yu-ting	
2018	Campus Heroes	高校英雄傳	Gao Ai-ni	
2018	JUDO HIGH	熱血高校	Tu Ling-chih	Web series
2019	Without Her, Even Hero is 0	我是顧家男	Hu Xin-yi	
2019	Brave to Love	愛情白皮書	Clerk	
2020	The Wonder Woman	跟鯊魚接吻	Tang Hsiao-an	
2022	Women in Taipei	台北女子圖鑑	Sabrina	
2022	Lesson in Love	第9節課	Fang Hsin-i	
