= One Million Star season 1 =

One Million Star
- Season 1
- Starring: Momoko Tao (陶晶瑩); Yuan Wei Jen (袁惟仁); Kay Huang (黃韻玲); Phil Chang (張宇); Roger Cheng (鄭建國)
- No. of episodes: 26

Release
- Original network: CTV
- Original release: January 5 – July 13, 2007

Season chronology
- Next → Season 2

The first season of One Million Star, a Taiwanese televised singing competition, began on January 5, 2007.

== Episodes ==
Date	Chapter	English	Chinese	Eliminations
1.12	01	Million Star Life-and-death Part 1	百萬巨星殊死戰(上)	none
1.19	02	Million Star Life-and-death Part 2	百萬巨星殊死戰(下)	none
1.26	03	Million Life-and-death Chapter 1: 20 from 50	百萬殊死戰Chapter 1：50人取20人	none
2.02	04	Tough battle: 20 from 50	艱難的戰役：50人取20人(下)	none
2.09	05	Newcomers & Defeated Resurrection	新聲報到&敗部復活賽	none
2.16	06		群星開唱賀新春	none
2.23	07	Defeated Resurrection only 3 from 50	背水一戰：終極敗部復活 25人取3人	none
3.02	08	Survival: 1 vs 1 PK Part 1	適者生存：一對一PK賽(上)	劉馨雯 Líu Xīnwén 鄭宇辰 Zhèng Yǔchén
3.09	09	1 vs 1 PK Part 2	鹿死誰手：一對一PK賽(下)	吳婉君 Wú Wǎnjūn 袁明哲 Yúan Míngzhé 陶妍妏 Elleya Tao
3.16	10	Oldies Song	再見風華：老歌指定賽	鄭智文 Zhèng Zhèwén 林佩薇 Lín Pèiwéi
3.23	11	Designated Fast Song	石破天驚：快歌指定賽	巫宗翰 Wū Zōnghàn 林彥銘 Lín Yànmíng
3.30	12	16 Finalist Designated Duet	合唱歌曲：16強合唱指定賽	安琪 Ān Qí
4.16	13	15 Finalist Knockout	15強淘汰賽	Christine Chen 陳美裡; Irene Chen 陳亭慧
4.13	14	Salute to the idol: Big Shock! Spot Test	向偶像致敬：大震撼！臨場狀況考驗淘汰賽	(Aska Birthday Celebration)
4.20	15	1 vs 1 PK Knockout	優勝劣敗：1對1PK賽	Eddie Cai 蔡政霖; Ophelia 蘇貝如
4.27	16	Designated Artists Duet	挑戰．試煉：藝人合唱指定賽	Cathy Shyu 徐凱希
5.04	17	Challenge Part I	機會．命運：踢館挑戰賽Part I	none
5.11	18	Challenge Part II	隱藏的危機：踢館挑戰賽Part II	Charks An 安伯政
5.18	19	Challenge Part III	心魔：踢館挑戰賽Part III	Sharon Li 李宣榕
5.25	20	Designated Challenge	他山之石可以攻錯：終極版指名踢館賽	Kevin Hsieh 謝震廷
6.01	21	Unplug Knockout	險峰：不插電演唱淘汰賽	Stanly Hsu 許仁杰
6.08	22	Elegy vs High song	水能載舟：地獄悲歌 vs 天堂High歌	none
6.15	23	Tacit Duet Test	老戰友：默契合唱考驗賽	none
6.22	24	Compressive Idol Duet	星光依舊燦爛：偶像對唱抗壓戰	Aska Yang 楊宗緯 (withdrew)
6.29	25	The Courage to Persist: Compete for the fifth place	堅持的勇氣：第五名決定賽	Miles Liu 劉明峰
7.06	26	Finals	總決賽	First place: Yoga Lin 林宥嘉; Second place: Judy Chou 周定緯; Third place: Peter Pan 潘裕文; Fourth place: Afalean Lu 盧學叡
7.13		Stars Presentation Ceremony	星光頒獎典禮	none

== Ranking ==
The ranking and score of each episodes.

Order	Ep 10	Ep 11	Ep 12	Ep 13	Ep 14	Ep 15	Ep 16	Ep 17	Ep 18	Ep 19	Ep 20	Ep 21	Ep 22	Ep 23	Ep 24	Ep 25	Ep 26
1.	Aska (20)	Miles (16)	James (19)	Aska (13)	Afalean (20)	Aska (20)	James (20)	James (20)	Aska (19)	James (20)	James (25)	James (20)	Aska (20)	James (23)	James (23)	James (23)	James
2.	Stanly (20)	James (16)	Ring (19)	Judy (13)	Judy (19)	Judy (20)	Aska (18)	Stanly (20)	Judy (16)	Stanly (19)	Aska (24)	Aska (20)	Peter (18)	Afalean (21)	Peter (22)	Peter (19)	Judy
3.	Judy (17)	Sharon (15)	Charks (19)	Afalean (12)	James (19)	Miles (20)	Peter (17)	Afalean (20)	Peter (16)	Miles (17)	Stanly (17)	Miles (18)	Judy (18)	Aska (19)	Judy (21)	Afalean (18)	Peter
4.	Ān Qí (15)	Charks (14)	Kevin (19)	Miles (12)	Miles (18)	Peter (20)	Kevin (17)	Sharon (17)	Stanly (16)	Afalean (15)	Peter (17)	Judy (17)	James (17)	Judy (15)	Stanly (18)	Judy (18)	Afalean
5.	Ophelia (14)	Afalean (14)	Aska (18)	Ring (12)	Stanly (16)	Sharon (18)	Judy (16)	Aska (17)	Miles (15)	Aska (14)	Afalean (17)	Peter (17)	Miles (17)	Peter (15)	Miles (16)	Miles (16)	
6.	Ring (13)	Peter (13)	Peter (18)	Stanly (12)	Ring (16)	Stanly (17)	Stanly (15)	Miles (17)	Charks (13)	Sharon (13)	Judy (16)	Stanly (14)	Afalean (15)	Miles (14)	Afalean (15)		
7.	Eddie (12)	Lín Yànmíng (13)	Judy (16)	James (11)	Sharon (15)	Ring (16)	Afalean (13)	Kevin (17)	Kevin (12)	Judy (13)	Miles (16)	Afalean (13)					
8.	Lín Pèiwéi (11)	Wū Zōnghàn (12)	Sharon (16)	Charks (11)	Charks (14)	Charks (20)	Sharon (13)	Peter (13)	Sharon	Kevin (13)	Kevin (13)						
9.	Irene (10)	Kevin (12)	Afalean (16)	Peter (11)	Eddie (14)	Afalean (20)	Ring (12)	Judy	James	Peter							
10.	Zhèng Zhèwén (10)	Christine (12)	Christine (16)	Kevin (11)	Peter (14)	Kevin (19)	Miles (11)	Charks	Afalean								
11.			Stanly (14)	Eddie (10)	Kevin (13)	Eddie (17)	Charks (9)										
12.			Irene (14)	Sharon (10)	Ophelia (13)	James (16)											
13.			Eddie (11)	Christine (9)	Aska (11)	Ophelia (16)											
14.			Ophelia (11)	Ophelia (9)													
15.			Miles (11)	Irene (9)													
16.			An Qi (11)														

The winning contestant.
The contestants who scored higher than 20.
The contestant who failed.
The contestant who was eliminated.

== The six finalists ==
Chapter	James Lin	Judy Chou	Peter Pan	Afalean Lu	Miles Liu	Aska Yang
Ep 22	17	18	18	15	17	20
Ep 23	23	15	15	21	14	19
Ep 24	23	21	22	15	16	–
Ep 25	23	18	19	18	16	–
Ep 26	25	21	21	18	–	–
Total	111	95	93	87	63	39
Average	23.6	20	19.8	17.7	--	--

The contestant with the highest score.
The contestant with the full score.

== Million Star Gang ==
Members of Million Star Gang (星光幫)

- James Lin (林宥嘉)
- Judy Chou (周定緯)
- Peter Pan (潘裕文)
- Afalean Lu (盧學叡)
- Miles Liu (劉明峰)
- Stanly Xu (許仁杰)
- Kevin Xie (謝震廷)
- Sharon Li (李宣榕)
- Charks An (安伯政)
- Ring Hsu (徐宛鈴)
- Aska Yang (楊宗緯)

== Discography ==
Stars Reunion / 星光同學會

- Released: June 29, 2007
- Format: CD+DVD
- Label: HIM International Music
- Tracks:
1. Because I Believe (因為我相信) – (星光十強) 大合唱
2. Hostage (人質) – Aska Yang (楊宗緯)
3. The One I Love (我愛的人) – Yoga Lin (林宥嘉)
4. Leave Me (離開我) – Afalean Lu (盧學叡)
5. Love is Suspicion (愛是懷疑) – Judy Chou (周定緯)
6. A Safe Feeling (安全感) – Peter Pan (潘裕文)
7. Endless Love (無盡的愛)(自創曲) – Miles Liu (劉明峰)
8. Betrayal (背叛) – Aska Yang (楊宗緯)
9. Forever Love – Stanly Xu (許仁杰)
10. Remember (記得) – Sharon Li (李宣榕)
11. Bicycle (腳踏車) – Charks An (安伯政)
12. When We Were Young (我們小時候) – Kevin Xie (謝震廷)

Yesterday, Today, Tomorrow / 愛 星光精選 昨天 今天 明天

- Released: October 5, 2007
- Format: CD+DVD
- Label: HIM International Music
- Tracks:
1. Always by My Side (總在我身旁) – 大合唱 (Yoga Lin, Judy Chou, Peter Pan, Stanly Xu, Miles Liu, Kevin Xie, Sharon Li, Charks An, Ring Hsu)
2. I Can't Sing (我不會唱歌) – Judy Chou (周定緯)
3. That Very Song (那首歌) – Yoga Lin (林宥嘉)
4. Redundant (多餘) – Aska Yang (楊宗緯)
5. Dream Catcher (捕夢人) – Peter Pan (潘裕文)
6. Not so Silent Night (不安静的夜) – Stanly Xu (許仁杰)
7. Your Backpack (你的背包) – Charks An (安伯政)
8. You Are My Guiding Eyes (你是我的眼) – Yoga Lin (林宥嘉)
9. A Life an Angel Envies (天使忌妒的生活) – Stanly Xu (許仁杰)
10. Lonely One (離人) – Peter Pan (潘裕文)
11. Presentiment (from Winter Sonata) (預感) – Judy Chou (周定緯)
12. In Love With A Street (愛上了一條街) – Sharon Li (李宣榕)
13. I Can (我可以) – Kevin Xie (謝震廷)
14. Man Walking on Tight Rope (走鋼索的人) – Yoga Lin (林宥嘉)
15. Attachment (依戀) (自創曲) – Miles Liu (劉明峰)
16. Star: Remix (星光閃耀組曲) (Yoga Lin: That Very Song, Aska Yang: Broken Wings, Judy Chou: I Can't Sing, Stanly Xu: Not so Silent Night, Peter Pan: Dream Catcher)
