= Aska Yang =

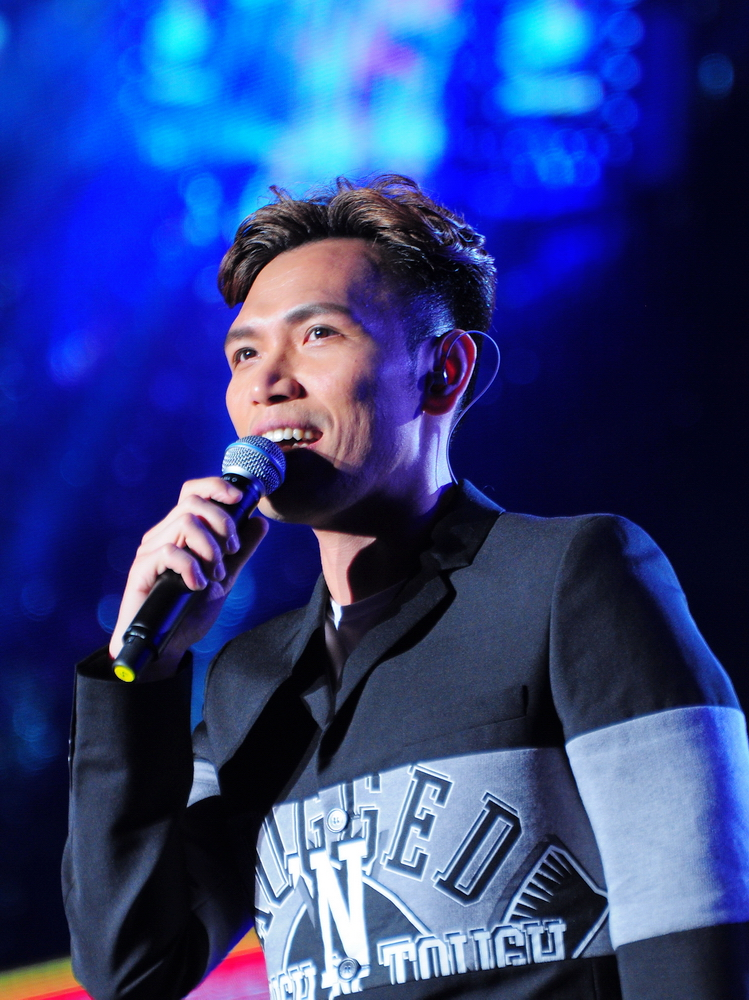
- 2014 in Taiwan
- Born: April 4, 1978 (age 48); Taoyuan City (now Taoyuan District), Taiwan, Republic of China
- Occupation: Singer
- Years active: 2007–present

Chinese name
- Traditional Chinese: 楊宗緯
- Simplified Chinese: 杨宗纬
Transcriptions
Standard Mandarin
- Hanyu Pinyin: Yáng Zōng Wěi
- Musical career
- Origin: Republic of China (Taiwan)
- Genres: Mandopop
- Labels: HIM International Music; Warner Music Taiwan; MARS
- Website: Aska Yang's official website

Aska Yang (traditional Chinese: 楊宗緯; simplified Chinese: 杨宗纬; Hanyu Pinyin: Yáng Zōngwěi; Tongyong Pinyin: Yáng Zong-Wěi, born April 4, 1978, in Taoyuan City (now Taoyuan District), Taiwan) is a Taiwanese Mandopop singer.

== Music career ==
=== One Million Star (2007) ===
Aska Yang debut in Taiwan as a contestant on season one of Taiwanese TV singing contest One Million Star. He sang songs such as "再見我的愛人" (Goodbye My Love), "人質" (Hostage), "背叛" (Betrayal), "新不了情" (New Endless Love).

Nevertheless, the final ten contestants, including Yang, had released two compilation albums, Stars Reunion (星光同學會-超級星光大道10強紀念合輯) and Yesterday, Today, Tomorrow (愛.星光精選-昨天 今天 明天) in June and October respectively. He recorded a total of four songs in both albums:

1. "Because I believe (因為我相信)" – jointly sang with other contestants;
2. "Betrayal (背叛)" – originally sung by Gary Cao;
3. "Hostage (人質)" – originally sung by A-mei; and
4. "Broken Wings (多餘)" – theme song from the movie "Keep Watching (沈睡的青春)", and it is the first original song of Aska Yang.

He was ranked second in "Person of the Year" by Yahoo!Taiwan and was also listed in a book called "Who's Who in the ROC, 2007–2008".

=== Debut album and concert (2008) ===
After reaching an agreement with his manager at the end of 2007, his musical career formally started. He released his debut solo album, titled Dove (鴿子), in January 2008, and it became the best-selling album in the first half of the year. The tracks "洋蔥" (Onion), "鴿子" (Dove) and "幸福的風" (Wind of Happiness) are listed at number 1, 5 and 12 respectively on Hit Fm Taiwan's Hit Fm Annual Top 100 Singles Chart (Hit-Fm年度百首單曲) for 2008. The track, "鴿子" (Dove) won one of the Top 10 Songs of the Year and "洋蔥" (Onion) won Best Loved Song by Audience at the 2009 HITO Radio Music Awards presented by Taiwanese radio station Hit FM.

His fan base began to expand to other regions like Singapore, Malaysia and Hong Kong. Yang also played his first solo concert in Taipei Arena in May, just four months after the release of his debut album. However, after the solo concert, he was embroiled in conflict with his manager again. The dispute resulted in a sudden pause in his career. In October 2008, Aska Yang formally announced the termination of his contract.

=== Restart (2009) ===
While attempting to resolve the outstanding contract issues by going to court, Aska restarted his music career in early 2009. He held a mini-concert in Taipei on January 11 and also began participating in other performance events, such as TV shows, concerts and musical plays. Outside the entertainment business, he enters the Graduate Institute of Physical Education of National Taiwan Sport University to study for a master's degree in Sport and Exercise Psychology.

== Discographies ==
=== Studio albums ===
#	Album Info	Track listing	Bonus DVD
1st	Dove (鴿子) (CD): Release Date: January 16, 2008; Label: Warner Music Taiwan; Dove (Commemorate Edition) (CD+DVD): Release Date: February 29, 2008; Label: Warner Music Taiwan	1. "讓" (Give Way); 2. "幸福的風" (Wind of Happiness); 3. "鴿子" (Dove); 4. "洋蔥" (Onion); 5. "重來好不好" (Way back into love); 6. "One Day"; 7. "誰會改變我" (Who will Change Me); 8. "存愛" (Save love); 9. "對愛渴望" (Thirsty for love); 10. "回憶沙漠" (Recall the Desert); 11. "你看" (You See)	Dove (Commemorate Edition): 1. "鴿子" (Dove) MV; 2. "讓" (Give Way) MV; 3. "洋蔥" (Onion) MV; 4. "幸福的風" (Wind of Happiness) MV; 5. "對愛渴望" (Thirsty for love) MV
2nd	Pure (原色) (CD): Release Date: August 26, 2011; Label: Universal Music Taiwan	1. "底細" (True Love); 2. "懷珠" (Precious Pearl); 3. "光影" (Light in the Shadow); 4. "被遺忘的" (The Forgotten); 5. "時間神偷" (Thief Of Time); 6. "饞" (Greed); 7. "因為單身的緣故" (Because I'm Single); 8. "前戲" (Prelude); 9. "唱錯歌詞" (Wrong Lyrics); 10. "蠻荒情場" (Love Jungle); Bonus Track: 1. "那個男人" (That Man)	1. 懷珠 (Precious Pearl) Official MV; 2. 被遺忘的 (The Forgotten) Official MV; 3. 那個男人 (That Man)Official MV
3rd	First Love (初愛) (CD): Release Date: March 29, 2013; Label: Universal Music Taiwan	1. "其實都沒有" (Nothing at All); 2. "忘了我" (Forget Me); 3. "想對你說" (I Wanna Say To You); 4. "低迴" (Whisper); 5. "初愛" (First Love); 6. "沒有什麼不能" (Nothing Is Impossible); 7. "無邪" (Innocent); 8. "無常" (Impermanence); 9. "出走" (Walking Out); 10. "這一路走來" (Along The Way)	1. 其實都沒有 (Nothing at All) Official MV; 2. 忘了我 (Forget Me) Official MV; 3. 想對你說 (I Wanna Say To You)Official MV; 4. 這一路走來 (Along The Way)Official MV

=== Compilation albums ===
Title	Info	Earliest Release Date	Record label
Star Reunion (星光同學會-超級星光大道10強紀念合輯)		June 29, 2007	HIM International Music
Yesterday, Today, Tomorrow(星光幫 / 愛.星光精選-昨天 今天 明天)		October 5, 2007	HIM International Music
Indigo Blue From Nan (青出于楠)	Duet by : Cong Hao Nan & Aska Yang / Single: My Sun	May 17, 2009	Hua Yi Brothers
Love Destiny (愛情自有天意)	Qi Wei & Aska Yang, TV series "Love Destiny" theme song duet	January 23, 2013	Ocean Butterfly Music
Laughing at the World (橫掃天下之笑天下)	Online game theme song "笑天下" Laughing at the World	June 27, 2013	
Song Not Yet Ended (歌未央)	Showcases Beauty of Taiwan to promote tourism in Taiwan, selected by TSTA	August 5, 2013	TH Entertainment
We've met Before(我們好像在哪見過)	Pei Yeh & Aska Yang, TV series "We got married!" theme song duet	October 29, 2013	
The Lotus Song(蓮花落)	Theme song of stage show-《Crystal Boys》 《孽子》	February 7, 2014	
Empty Space (空白格)	Theme song of Movie 《But Always》	September 5, 2014	Jingdong
I have changed, no I have not (我變了 我沒變)	Theme song of Jingdon.com 12th anniversary	May 13, 2015	Jingdong
The King and the Pauper (國王與乞丐)	Chenyu Hua & Aska Yang, song in the 2nd album of Chenyu Hua	June 26, 2015	EE-Media

=== Live albums ===
Title	Earliest Release Date	Track Listing	Record label
Star! Start! Aska Yang Live Concert (Star! Start! 星空傳奇 Live Concert )	August 15, 2008	1. "讓" (Give way); 2. "誰會改變我" (Who will Change Me？); 3. "有時候沒時候" (Sometimes); 4. "Because You're Good To Me"; 5. "Monica"; 6. "天氣這麼熱" (It's So Hot); 7. "美麗的稻穗" (Rice Paddies); 8. "月夜愁"(Sorrow in the Moon Night); 9. "明日晴れるかな"(Tomorrow，a sunny day?); 10. "阿牛"(A-Niu); 11. "多餘"(Broken Wings); 12. "幸福的風"(Wind of Happiness); 13. "Sexy Back"; 14. "龍的傳人"(The Dragon Children); 15. "愛我的請舉手"(Put your hands up if you love me); 16. "對愛渴望"(Thirsty for love); 17. "Rehab"; 18. "永遠的微笑" (Everlasting Smille); 19. "You Don't Trust Me at All"; 20. "你看＋重來好不好"(You See + Way back into love?); 21. "微風早晨"(Gentle Breeze in the Morning); 22. "回憶沙漠"(Recall the Desert); 23. "給未來的自己" (To The Future Me ) 24. "藍眼睛"(Blue eyes); 25. "流浪記"(The wandering Journey); 26. "遇見＋迴旋木馬的終端" (Meet up + End of the Merry-Go-Round); 27. "鴿子"(Dove); 28. "哭了"(Cry); 29. "人質"(Hostage); 30. "背叛"(Betrayal); 31. "聽說愛情回來過"(Return of Love); 32. "洋蔥"(Onion); 33. "One Day"	Warner Music Taiwan

=== Singles ===
Title	Earliest Release Date	Track Listing	Record label
Shine ! 閃耀	September 22, 2013	"閃耀" (Shine)	TH Entertainment

== Awards and nominations ==
- 2008: Hito Pop Music Award~ – Aska Yang along with The Million Star Gang won the 「Hito Best New Artists Award」With the 「Million Star Reunion 10 Finalist Special Album」
- 2008: Hito Pop Music Award – Aska Yang along with The Million Star Gang won the {Best New Artist Award}
- 2008: 5th Annual SuperStar Singers Award~ Aska Yang won { Best New Artist Award}
- 2008: Singapore Golden Melody Award – Aska Yang won 5 awards including: 「Outstanding New Artist Award」、「Best Male Singer Award」、「Most Popular New Artist Award」、「Y.E.S 933 Longest Chart Holder Song《Onion》」、「Y.E.S 933 Number # 1 on Top Ten Most Popular Song Chart 《Onion》」
- 2009: Singapore Entertainment Awards – Aska Yang won 3 awards : Regional Newcomer of the Year Media Award; Most Popular Regional Newcomer; Radio 100.3 Most Popular Song ~ Onion
- 2009: Hito Radio Pop Music Award – 「 2008 Best Top 10 Mandarin Songs(05)- Aska Yang (Dove) 」、「 2008 Fan's Choice Award – Aska Yang（Onion）」
- 2009: 2nd Annual Kiss Apple Top 10 Love Songs Award, won with《Onion》
- 2010: CCTV<M! Countdown > Universal Pop Music Festival In LuoYang City – HK/TW 2010 Media’s Most Favorite Upcoming Singer’s Award
- 2011: Elle 20th Anniversary People's Award~ The Greater Chinese Internet Most Favorite Male Artist Of The Year
- 2011: Beijing Fourth Annual MNSSE Music Billboard Award – Best Album Of The Year: PURE
- 2011: Third Annual Yahoo! Award『Most Favorite Male Artist Of The Year 』

== Major concerts ==
Date	Title	Venue	Track listing
December 29, 2007	Million Star Gang Joint Concert 星光幫之老師同學會演唱會	National Taiwan University Sports Center	
May 17, 2008	Aska Yang Star！Start！Live Concert 楊宗緯星空傳奇演唱會	Taipei Arena	
December 21, 2008	X'mas with Aska Yang	The Arkhub@kallang Community Club (Singapore)	
January 11, 2009	2009 Taipei Mini Concert 楊宗緯不墜演唱會	Riverside Live House	
April 3, 2010	One Million Star Concert	Pearl Concret Theater, Palms Casino Resort, Las Vegas	
June 17 and 18, 2011	Aska's Ego Reflection Live Concert 楊宗緯『宗於自我』音樂會	Legacy Taipei, Taiwan	1. "就算世界與我為敵" (Enemy); 2. "給未來的自己" (To My Future Self); 3. "漂著" (Drifting); 4. "如果真的不要" (Take or Leave); 5. "夕陽伴我歸" (Sunset Takes Me Home); 6. "膽小鬼" (Coward); 7. "這樣愛你對不對" (Is It Right to Love You); 8. "傷心地鐵" (Sadness Subway); 9. "12樓" (Twelfth Floor); 10. "如此" (Always with You); 11. "The Walk"; 12. "我的思念" (I Miss Only You); 13. "空白格" (Blank Space); 14. "被遺忘的" (The Forgotten); 15. "True Colors"; 16. "對愛渴望" (Love Temptation); 17. "多餘" (Broken Wings); 18. "那個男人" (That Man)
August 26, 27 and 28, 2011	Aska's Pure Live Concert 楊宗緯『原色』音樂會	Legacy Taipei, Taiwan	

== Endorsements ==
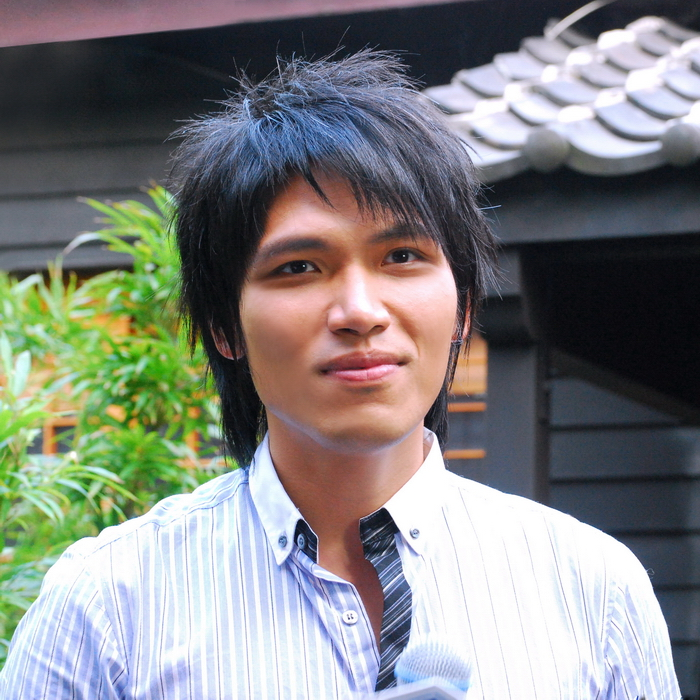
The Magic School spokesman

Charity

- 2007.9 : Voice of Taipei (Hit FM) Celebrity hand-painted Signature Net Cap Auction : Aska Yang's fans club won the highest bidding and raised NT $200,000. The money was given to the Chinese Children Home and Shelter Association.
- 2007.9 : Aska Yang's fans club donated the net cap to the Taipei Women Rescue Foundation (TWRF) for a live auction in the 20th anniversary of Appreciation Reception. The former chairman of TWRF, attorney Ying-Chi Liao, won the final bid of 300,000 NT dollars, and returned this monumental net cap back to Yang.
- 2007.9.15 : Aska Yang then offered the cap to National Changhua University of Education for collection. With Yang and his fans' help, TWRF raised a total of 1,290,136 NT dollars, on the day of the Anniversary Appreciation Reception.
- 2007-09-15 : Spokesman of Taipei Women's Rescue Foundation
- 2007 : Spokesman of the non-profit event "The Magic School"
- 2008-01-18 : Spokesman of the Public Traffic Safety Film Contest Sponsored by PBS Television in conjunction with Ho-Tai Automobile Manufacture.
- 2008-02-20 : Spokesman of Taipei Women's Rescue Foundation Charity Movie Premiere "Persepolis".
- 2008-05-17 : Star! Start! Solo Debut Concert at the Taipei Arena : Aska Yang donated his entire income to the victims of the Sichuan earthquake in China.
- 2008-06-21 : Taipei Women's Rescue Foundation~ 10 years celebration of the Domestic Violence Legislation Act.
- 2008-10-06 : Aska Yang donated NT$500,000 to the ChuangHua Teacher's University Alumni Association Scholarship Fund.
- 2009-01-23 : Aska Yang donated a " Love" necklace for the 【Go! Love】 Celebrity Auction event. His necklace raised NT$120,900.
- 2009-07-27～2009-08-05 : Taiwan Red Cross fundraiser for low-income children~ Aska Yang's hand print signature card raised NT$147,532.
- 2009-08-14 : CTV 「Spread the Love −88 Flood Victims Fundraiser Event」~ Aska Yang and his fans clubs donated NT$1,000,000.00
- 2009-08-15～2009-08-16 : Taiwan World's Vision Foundation~ 20th annual Hunger 30hours Fundraiser Event ~ Aska Yang and his fans club donated NT $500,000.

Commercial

- 2007 Uni-President Cup Triathlon Championship TV advertisement
- 2007 EZPeer TOGO MP4 player
- 2008 Pearly Gates~Japanese Golf Designer Name Brand
- 2008 Spokesman of 2008 Taiwan National Intercollegiate Athletic Games
