= Lee Chien-na =

Taiwanese singer and actress

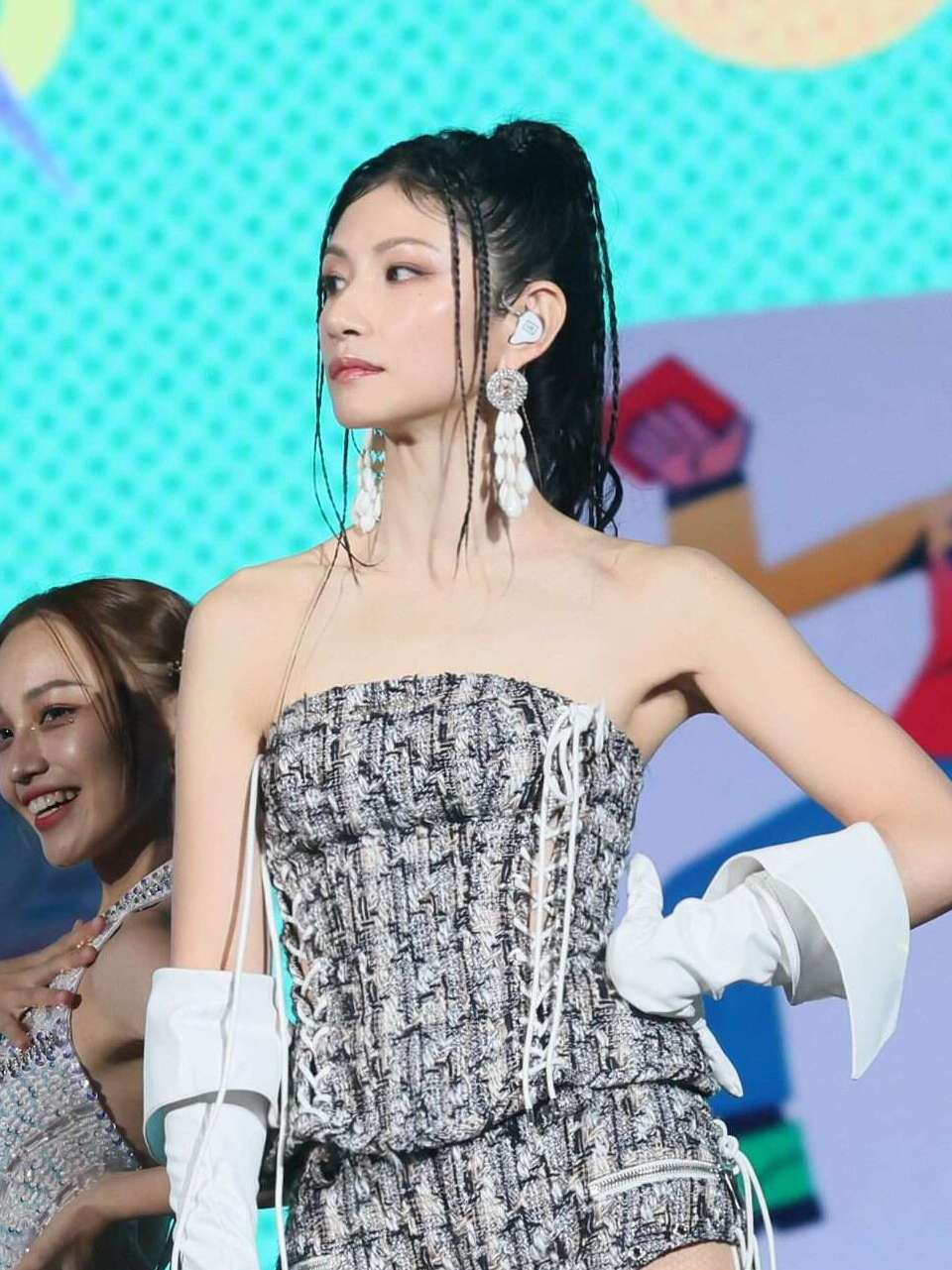
- Lee at Taipei New Year's Eve Party in 2025
- Born: 22 November 1984 (age 41); Nantou, Taiwan
- Occupations: Singer; actress
- Years active: 2008–present
- Musical career
- Also known as: Gina Lee, Li Qianna, Nana Lee
- Genres: Mandarin Pop, Taiwanese Rock
- Label: Universal Music Taiwan

Lee Chien-na (Chinese: 李千那; pinyin: Lǐ Qiānnà; Wade–Giles: Lee Chien-na; born 22 November 1984) is a Taiwanese singer and actress.

== Career ==
In 2007, Lee's entertainment career started as a participant in Season 2 of One Million Star.

In April 2009, Lee collaborated with Chou Chuan-huing, her teacher, on the song "Sad Glass" ("傷心酒杯"), which was included in his 2009 album, Lovers' Genesis.

Lee has starred in a number of films since 2010, namely Juliets (茱麗葉, 2010), Together (甜．秘密, 2012), To My Dear Granny (親愛的奶奶, 2013), Zinnia Flower, 52Hz, I Love You (2017) and numerous television series such as Ex-Boyfriend (2011). She also starred in Youth Power (哇！陳怡君, 2015).

=== One Million Star ===
One Million Star (season 2)

Week #	Theme	Song choice	Original artist	Marks #	Result
Hundred-people Elimination	Contestant's Choice	"非你莫屬" "無言花"	Tank; Jody Chiang	16 Marks	Advanced
My Music Story	Contestant's Choice	"記事本"	Steve Chou	15 Marks	Safe
PK	Contestant's Choice	"愛到才知痛"	Huang Yee-ling	16 Marks	Safe
Decisive Dual	Group Performance	"無人來作伴"	Weng Li-you, Shan Lin	16 Marks	Safe
Year they Were Born (1984)	Contestant'Choice	"惜別的海岸"	Jody Chiang	17 Marks	Safe
My Hit Single	Contestant's Choice	"恩情無人可比"	Sun Shu-mei	18 Marks	Safe
The Most Memorable Voice	Contestant's Choice	"往昔"	Monique Lin	17 Marks	Advance
Single-Album Artists PK	Contestant's Choice	無字的情批	Huang Yee-ling	14 Marks	Advance
2007 New Album	Contestant's Choice	"沒有你的日子我好孤單"	Aimee Han	15 Marks	Advance
TV Drama Theme Song	Contestant's Choice	"桂花巷"	Michelle Pan	15 Marks	Advance
Upbeat Songs	Contestant's Choice	唯舞獨尊	Jolin Tsai	17 Marks	Advance
Designated Artists Duet	Contestant's Choice	"夢中的情話/阿杜+江蕙"	A-do, Jody Chiang	18 Marks	Safe
Top 10	Unplugged	心事誰人知	Shen Wen-cheng	17 Marks	Bottom
Top 10	Translated Songs	"陪我看日出" "淚光閃閃"	Joi Chua; Rimi Natsukawa	16 Marks	Eliminated

== Personal life ==
Lee Chien-na was raised in Nantou City. At birth her name was 李千娜; Lǐ Qiānnà; she changed it to 李千那; Lǐ Qiānnà two months before her 34th birthday, 22 November 2018. She has performed under the names Gina Lee and Nana Lee.

Lee was married, and had two children before that relationship ended in divorce. Her relationship with beatboxer Echo Lee began in 2014 and ended in 2020.

== Filmography ==
=== Television series ===
Year	English title	Mandarin title	Role	Notes
2011	Ex-boyfriend	前男友	Diana Lin Chun-chiao	
2012	Gung Hay Fat Choy	我們發財了	Chiang Yu-chun	
2013	A Hint of You	美味的想念	Hsia Ching-yu	
2014	Once Upon a Time in Beitou	熱海戀歌	Wu Hsiu-hsiu / Shirahara Setsuko	
2015	Youth Power	哇！陳怡君	Sabrina	
2015	The Day I Lost You	失去你的那一天	Ho Hsuan	
2016	Chloe	迷徒Chloe	Chloe	Webseries
2017	The Teenage Psychic	通靈少女	Alice	2 episodes
2017	Running Man	逃婚一百次	Chung Ai-ching	
2018–2019	My Goddess	種菜女神	Ping Zhen Xi	

=== Film ===
Year	English title	Mandarin title	Role	Notes
2008	Stars	星光傳奇	Herself	Documentary
2010	Juliets	朱麗葉	Ah-mei / Julie	Segment: "Two Juliets"
2011	Midnight Café	夜咖啡	Café owner	Short film
2012	Together	甜．秘密	Hsiao Lan	
2012	Flower Stick	花若離枝	Yu Fang	
2012	To My Dear Granny	親愛的奶奶	A-ban	
2013	Including Her Out	華麗緣	Tsui-yu	Featurette
2014	Meeting Dr. Sun	行動代號：孫中山	The girlfriend	Alternative title: Salute! Sun Yat-Sen; Cameo
2015	Lion Dancing 2	鐵獅玉玲瓏 2	Nana	
2015	Zinnia Flower	百日告別	Ting	
2016	Rookie Chef	神廚	Chao Shih-shih	Cameo
2016	Love After Time	愛在世界末日	Woman	Short film
2017	52Hz, I Love You	52赫茲我愛你	Mei	Cameo
2018	The Last Memory	最後的記憶	Lin Hsiao-chin	Short film
2018	The Scoundrels	狂徒	Li Hhsin-chieh	
2022	Untouchable	少年吔	Wen Tzu	
2023	Lost in Forest	山中森林	Hsiao Ching	
2023	U Motherbaker	我的婆婆怎麼把OO搞丟了	Passerby	Cameo
2023	Be with me	車頂上的玄天上帝	Singer	Cameo

== Discography ==
=== Studio albums ===
Title	Album details	Track listing
Lee Chien-na 李千娜同名專輯	Released: 22 March 2011; Label: Universal Music Taiwan; Formats: CD, digital download	Track listing: 1. 尾班車; 2. 我不允許我再愛上你; 3. 忽然明白; 4. 勇敢地離開你; 5. 我的安東尼; 6. 還要傻多久; 7. 窮開心; 8. 陽台上的星空; 9. 愛錯了才懂; 10. 熊熊想起伊來
Love, Arrive 愛到站了	Released: 16 May 2014; Label: Universal Music Taiwan; Formats: CD, digital download	Track listing: 1. 愛 到站了; 2. 心花開; 3. 弱點; 4. 不上班; 5. 致命的錯覺; 6. 美麗的意外; 7. 一次就夠; 8. 謝謝你; 9. 心愛的Honey (feat. Lee Lee-zen)
Be Honest 說實話	Released: 22 April 2016; Label: Universal Music Taiwan; Formats: CD, digital download	Track listing: 1. 金魚; 2. 厚臉皮; 3. 最愛的人 feat. Dawen; 4. 說實話; 5. 愛呀; 6. 爸爸; 7. 甜美的繩索; 8. Gonna Be Ok; 9. 對自己說抱歉; 10. 打勾勾

== Awards and nominations ==
Year	Award	Category	Nominated work	Result
2010	47th Golden Horse Awards	Best New Performer	Juliets	Won
2012	47th Golden Bell Awards	Best Actress	Ex-boyfriend	Nominated
2016	51st Golden Bell Awards	Best Actress	The Day I Lost You	Nominated
2017	52nd Golden Bell Awards	Best Supporting Actress in a Miniseries or Television Film	The Teenage Psychic	Won
2019	30th Golden Melody Awards	Best Female Taiwanese Singer	Tsa-bóo gín-á (查某囡仔)	Nominated
2019	30th Golden Melody Awards	Best Taiwanese Album	Tsa-bóo gín-á (查某囡仔)	Nominated
2019	30th Golden Melody Awards	Album of the Year	Tsa-bóo gín-á (查某囡仔)	Nominated
