= Wang Zhen =

Wang Zhen (Wade–Giles: Wang Chen) or Zhen Wang is the name of:

- Wang Zhen (inventor) (fl. 1290–1333), Yuan dynasty official and inventor of a wooden movable type printing
- Wang Zhen (eunuch) (died 1449), Ming dynasty eunuch
- Wang Yiting or Wang Zhen (1867–1938), Chinese businessman and painter
- Wang Zhen (general) (1908–1993), Chinese general and politician, one of the Eight Elders of the Chinese Communist Party
- Zhen Jane Wang, Chinese-Canadian signal processing researcher

== Sportspeople ==
- Wang Zhen (gymnast) (born 1985), Chinese acrobatic gymnast
- Eugene Wang (born 1985), Chinese-born Canadian table tennis player, born Wang Zhen
- Wang Zhen (cyclist) (born 1989), Chinese cross-country mountain biker
- Wang Zhen (race walker) (born 1991), Chinese race walking athlete
- Wang Zhen (high jumper) (born 2001), Chinese high jumper

== See also ==
- Wang Chen (disambiguation)
- Wang Zheng (disambiguation)
