= Running Man (Taiwanese TV series) =

2017 Taiwanese television series

- Promotional poster
- Also known as: Runaway Groom
- 逃婚100次
- Genre: Comedy, Fantasy
- Written by: Yang Wan Ru 楊宛儒
- Directed by: Kitamura Toyoharu
- Starring: Alien Huang; Lee Chien-na; Na Dow; Chang Chin-lan
- Country of origin: Taiwan
- Original language: Mandarin

Production
- Producers: Ceng Han Xian 曾瀚賢; Xu Wen Xiong 許文雄
- Production location: Taiwan
- Production company: Greener Grass Production

Running Man (Chinese: 逃婚100次) is a 2017 Taiwanese series starring Alien Huang, Lee Chien-na, Na Dow and Chang Chin-lan. Filming began on 14 May 2017.

== Cast ==
=== Main cast ===
Cast	Role	Description
Alien Huang	Hsu Da-cai	
Lee Chien-na	Chung Ai-ching	
Na Dow	Tseng Da-li	
Chang Chin-Lan	Shen Jia-yi	

== Broadcast information ==
Network	Country	Airing Date	Timeslot
myVideo	Taiwan	12 October 2017	Thursday to Sunday 8:00-8:30 pm
friDay影音	Taiwan	12 October 2017	Thursday to Sunday 8:00-8:30 pm
LINE TV	Taiwan	12 October 2017	Thursday to Sunday 8:00-8:30 pm
CHOCO TV	Taiwan	12 October 2017	Thursday to Sunday 8:00-8:30 pm
KKTV	Taiwan	12 October 2017	Thursday to Sunday 9:00-9:30 pm
Videoland Drama	Taiwan	28 October 2017	Saturday to Sunday 9:00-10:00 pm
