= One Million Star season 2 =

One Million Star
- Season 2
- Starring: Yuan Wei Jen (袁惟仁); Kay Huang (黃韻玲); Phil Chang (張宇); Roger Cheng (鄭建國)
- No. of episodes: 28

Release
- Original network: CTV
- Original release: Invalid date range

Season chronology
- ← Previous; Season 1

The second season of One Million Star, a Taiwanese televised singing competition, began on July 20, 2007. Similar to the first season, the competition started with 100 participants, and most of the contents and rules remained unchanged. Altogether 28 episodes were aired.

== Million Star Gang II ==
Members of Million Star Gang II (星光二班)

- Yuming Lai
- Rachel Liang
- Uni Yeh (葉瑋庭)
- Quack Wu (吳忠明)
- Annie Lin (林宜融)
- Pets Tseng
- Jane Huang
- Queen Wei (魏如昀)
- Christina Lin (林佩瑤)
- Lee Chien-na

== Episodes ==
Date (2007–2008)	Chapter	English	Eliminations
7/20	01	Top 109: Auditions Premiere	none
7/27	02	Top 109: Auditions, Part 2	none
8/3	03	Top 46: My Music Story	none
8/10	04	Top 31: The Player-killing Rounds Premiere	Huang Maige; Ren Haixuan; Shi Fangyu
8/17	05	Top 31: The Player-killing Rounds, Part 2	Chén Yùcí; Pān Jiāruì
8/24	06	Top 26: Decisive Dual	Fàn Yángjĭng; Jiāng Zhōuháng; Wú Sīxuán
8/31	07	Top 23: Song From My Birth Year	Yáng Zōnghàn; Xiè Yòulíng; Lín Bóhóng
9/7	08	Top 20: My Hit Single	Wú Zhào; Golden Fang; Dài Annà
9/14	09	Top 17: The Most Memorable Voice	Lài Shèngwěi; An Qīnyún
9/21	10	Top 15: Single-Album Artists' Challenge	Xīn Bā
9/28	11	Top 14: 2007's Pick	Ryan Ding
10/5	12	Top 13: Designated Classic Movie/TV Drama Theme Song	Cherry Li
10/12	13	Top 12: Upbeat Songs	David Lin
10/19	14	Top 11: Duet with Designated Artists	Ray Liu
10/26	15	Top 10: Unplugged	none
11/2	16	Top 10: Translated Songs	Nana Lee
11/9	17	Top 9: Songs From Heaven And Hell	Christina Lin
11/16	18	Top 8: Duet With Season 1 Contestants	Quack Wu
11/23	19	Top 7: The Challenge Rounds Premiere	none
11/30	20	Top 7: The Challenge Rounds, Part 2	Rachel Liang
12/7	21	Top 6: The Challenge Rounds, Part 3	Queen Wei
12/14	22	Top 5: The Challenge Rounds, Part 4	Jane Huang
12/21	23	The Wildcard Round	Successful resurrections: Rachel Liang; Quack Wu
12/28	24	The Cumulative Rounds, Part 1: Familiarity and Breakthrough Challenge	none
1/4	25	The Cumulative Rounds, Part 2: Compressive Idol Duet	none
1/11	26	The Cumulative Rounds, Part 3: Top 6 Results	Pets Tseng
1/18	27	Live Finale	Winner: Yuming Lai; Runners up: Rachel Liang; Uni Yeh; Quack Wu; Annie Lin
1/25	28	Prize Presentation & Graduation	none

== Ranking ==
Below are the ranking and score of the delegates since episode 8, when the top 20 is announced.

Notes:

1. Episodes 24–26 are championships. The marks in these three episodes would be counted in the final, and the delegate with the lowest total mark in these three episodes would be eliminated and became the 6th place of season 2. The ranking of those three episodes in the chart below is the overall ranking of the championship after that episode/round.

Order	Episodes																					
Order	8	9	10	11	12	13	14	15	16	17	18	19	20	21	22	23	24	25	26A	26B	27A	27B
1.	Jane 21	Rachel 24	Yuming 22	Pets 24	Pets 23	Uni 24	Quack 20	Jane 23	Uni 21	Rachel 21	Yuming 23	Pets 20	Pets 21	Annie 22	Uni 20	Rachel 16	Rachel 21	Rachel 19	Rachel 19	Rachel 16	Rachel 24	Yuming 23
2.	Queen 20	Yuming 22	Uni 21	Yuming 22	Rachel 22	Rachel 23	Yuming 20	Rachel 23	Rachel 21	Yuming 21	Uni 22	Queen 20	Jane 20	Jane 21	Yumming 20	Quack 15	Annie 18	Quack 19	Annie 19	Annie 20	Uni 24	Rachel 21
3.	Yuming 20	David 21	Jane 20	Rachel 20	Annie 21	Pets 23	Jane 20	Pets 22	Quack 20	Annie 20	Jane 22	Yuming 20	Annie 20	Queen 20	Pets 19	Jane 09	Quack 15	Annie 16	Quack 16	Yumming 23	Yumming 20	Uni 20
4.	Rachel 20	Queen 19	Quack 20	Annie 19	Quack 21	Ray 22	Pets 19	Annie 21	Christina 18	Quack 20	Pets 21	Annie 20	Rachel 20	Yuming 19	Annie 15	Nana 02	Yuming 13	Yumming 20	Yumming 17	Quack 17	Quack 17	Quack 16
5.	Uni 18	Uni 19	Queen 19	Uni 19	Jane 20	Quack 21	Rachel 18	Uni 21	Annie 18	Queen 19	Annie 20	Jane 19	Yuming 20	Uni 19	Jane 15	Yuming	Pets 13	Pets 15	Pets 15	Uni 22	Annie 14	
6.	Annie 18	Ray 18	Ray 17	Jane 19	Queen 19	Christina 21	Annie 18	Queen 21	Yuming 18	Pets 17	Rachel 20	Rachel 18	Queen 19	Pets 17		Uni	Uni 12	Uni 15	Uni 13	Pets 16		
7.	Laishengwei 18	Annie 18	Annie 17	Ray 18	Christina 19	Annie 20	Queen 18	Yuming 21	Jane 18	Christina 16	Quack 17	Uni 17	Uni 17			Pets						
8.	David 18	Pets 18	Xinba 16	Queen 18	David 18	Yuming 20	Nana 18	Quack 19	Pets 16	Uni 16	Queen 16					Annie						
9.	Quack 18	Nana 17	Nana 14	Quack 17	Uni 18	Queen 19	Uni 17	Christina 18	Queen 16	Jane 16						Queen						
10.	Nana 18	Jane 15	David	David 15	Yuming 18	Jane 18	Ray 17	Nana 17	Nana 16							Christina						
11.	Ann 18	Xinba 15	Ryan	Christina 15	Ray 17	Nana 17	Christina 17															
12.	Ryan 16	Cherry 15	Cherry	Cherry 15	Cherry 17	David 14																
13.	Daianna 16	Ann 14	Pets	Nana 15	Nana 15																	
14.	Cherry 16	Quack 14	Christina	Ryan 14																		
15.	Christina 15	Ryan 13	Rachel																			
16.	Pets 15	Laishengwei 12																				
17.	Ray 14	Christina 11																				
18.	Xinba 13																					
19.	Golden 13																					
20.	Wuzhao 12																					

Color Codes：

Champion
20 points and above
Entered into Failure Area
Eliminated
Successful resurrection
Fail resurrection
Did not participate in that episode therefore skip to the next episode
Quit

== Contestant ==
Colour key

- Winner
- Runner-up
- Third place
- Fourth place
- Fifth place
- Sixth place
- 25 marks (full mark)
- 20 marks or above
- Contestant got 20 marks or above but lost in the PK
- Entered into "Failure" area / Contestant lost the PK
- Won the Wildcard Round
- Lost the Wildcard Round
- Contestant did not perform
- Eliminated
- Give up the Wildcard Round

=== Period 1 ===
Contestant	Episode 4–5	Episode 6	Episode 7	Episode 8	Episode 9	Episode 10	Episode 11	Episode 12	Episode 13	Episode 14
Yuming Lai 賴銘偉	17	15	18	20	22	22	20	18	20	20
Rachel Liang 梁文音	18	20	19	20	24		20	22	23	18
Uni Yeh 葉瑋庭	17	19	17	19	19	21	19	18	24	17
Quack Wu 吳忠明	15	15	12	18	14	20	17	21	21	20
Annie Lin 林宜融	14	16	17	18	18	17	19	21	20	18
Pets Tseng 曾沛慈	16	13	17	15	18		24	23	23	19
Jane Huang黃美珍	17	19	19	21	15	20	19	20	18	20
Queen Wei 魏如昀	18	15	14	20	19	19	18	19	19	18
Christina Lin 林佩瑤	15	11	16	15	11		15	19	21	17
Nana Lee 李千娜	16	16	17	18	17	14	15	16	17	18
Ray Liu 劉軒蓁	15	16	15	14	19	17	18	17	22	17
David Lin 林道遠	15	12	17	18	21		15	18	14	
Cherry Li 李繶蒨	13	15	14	16	15		15	17		
Ryan Ding 丁衣凡	14	20	12	16	13		14			
Xin Ba 辛巴	13	15	13	13	15	16				
安欽雲	16	15	13	18	14					
賴聖偉	13	15	17	18	12					
戴安娜	15	15	11	16						
Golden Fang 方志友	13	15	15	13						
吳兆	11	16	15	12						
林柏宏	15	15	12							
謝侑玲	13	14	12							
楊宗翰	10	14	9							
江舟航	13	13								
吳思璇	13	12								
范揚景	13	11								
陳毓慈	11									
潘家銳	10									
任海瑄	10									
黃麥哥	10									
施芳妤	9									

=== Period 2 ===
Contestant	Episode 15	Episode 16	Episode 17	Episode 18	Episode 19	Episode 20	Episode 21	Episode 22	Episode 23
Yuming Lai	20	18	21	23	20	20	19	20	
Uni Yeh	21	21	16	22	17	17	19	20	
Annie Lin	21	18	20	20	20	20	22	15	
Pets Tseng	22	16	17	21	20	21	17	19	
Jane Huang	23	18	16	22	19	20	21	15	9
Queen Wei	21	16	20	16	20	19	20		
Rachel Liang	23	21	21	20	18	20			16
Quack Wu	19	20	18	17					15
Christina Lin	18	18	16						
Nana Lee	17	16							2

=== Period 3 ===
Contestant	Episode 24	Episode 25	Episode 26		Episode 27	
Yuming Lai	13	20	17	23	20	23
Rachel Liang	21	19	19	16	24	21
Uni Yeh	12	15	13	22	24	20
Quack Wu	15	19	16	17	17	16
Annie Lin	18	16	19	20	14	
Pets Tseng	13	15	15	16		
