= Sha (Queen Wei album) =

Sha (傻)

Studio album by Queen Wei (魏如昀)
- Released: November 5, 2008
- Genre: Mandopop, Rock
- Label: Universal Music Taiwan

Sha (傻) is the debut album released by Taiwanese singer and songwriter Queen Wei (魏如昀).

== Track listing ==
1. 傻 (Silly)
2. 蝶戀 (Butterfly's Love)
3. 小彩虹 (Small Rainbow)
4. 他們 (They)
5. Luv Luv Luv
6. Party Days
7. 目光 (Vision)
8. 親愛的 (Dear)
9. 擁戴 (Support)
10. 門沒關 (Door Not Closed)
