= Taipei Women's Rescue Foundation =

Taiwanese non-profit organization

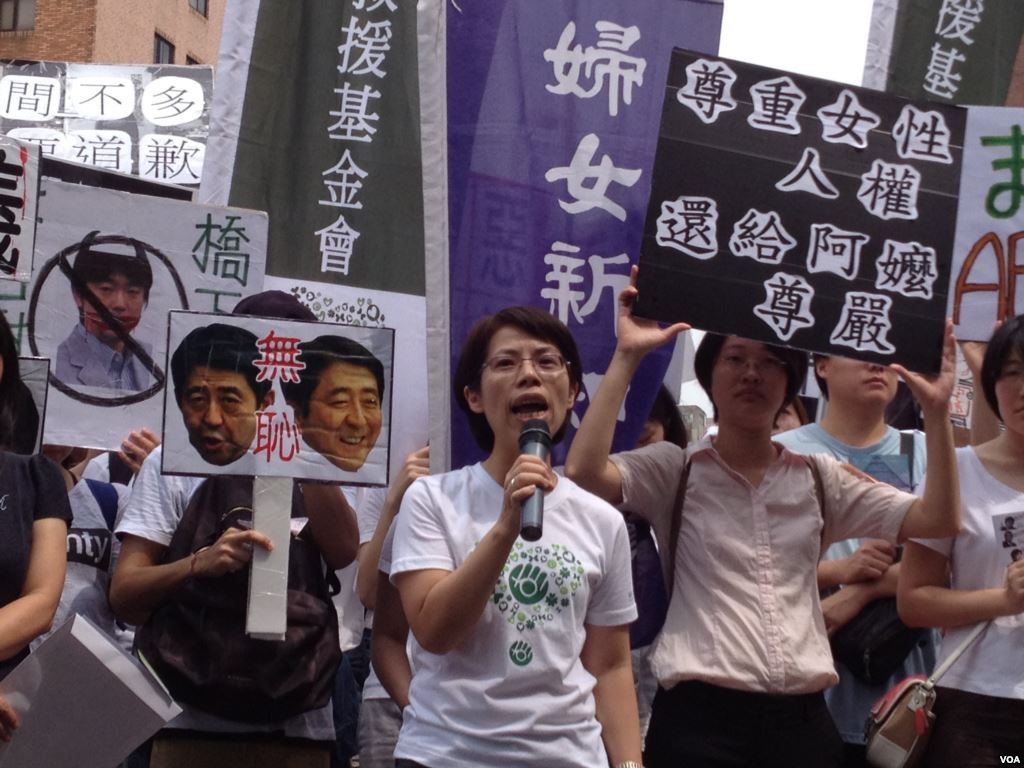
Members of TWRF in 2013

The Taipei Women’s Rescue Foundation (TWRF; Chinese: 財團法人台北市婦女救援社會福利事業基金會; pinyin: Cáituán fǎrén táiběi shì fùnǚ jiùyuán shèhuì fúlì shìyè jījīn huì) is a Taiwanese non-profit organization working to rescue and counsel female victims of human trafficking, prostitution and sexual or domestic violence.

== History ==
TWRF grew out of the Taiwanese non-profit women's organization, the Awakening Foundation. In 1988, with the help of lawyers, scholars and social workers, it was established as Taipei Women’s Rescue Foundation, an anti-human trafficking mission to fight on the behalf of girls forced into prostitution. Through protest activities and public awareness campaigns, TWRF sensitized the Taiwanese public and led a "social movement for justice for the disenfranchised in Taiwan".

Since 1992 the foundation has worked on the issue, women and girls who served as sex slaves to Japanese soldiers during World War II. TWRF has provided legal counsel and psychological support for these aging victims and has championed their cause by petitioning governments and courts both in Taiwan and in Japan.

== Comfort women ==
Immediately after the first Korean comfort women spoke out publicly for the first time in 1992, TWRF organized a hotline for former sex slaves from Taiwan to call and make themselves known, as well as investigative teams and research projects, thus spearheading a movement highlighting the plight of the former sex slaves and seeking justice and compensation for them.

The foundation coordinated in establishment of "Taiwan comfort women ad hoc committee" at the ministry level and formed an alliance with other countries to urge the Japanese government to issue a formal apology and to provide compensation to the victims.

The main activities of TWRF regarding the issue are to:

- help build societal awareness of comfort women
- provide social and emotional support for the victims in e.g. helping them to apply for government subsidies
- provide social and legal services and therapy
- help victims to take legal actions against Japanese government
- push to have the issue included in school textbooks.

TWRF established an online memorial museum about the subject, created exhibitions and publication and in 2014, produced a related documentary; its English title is Song of the Reed. It was directed by Wu Hsiu-ching (吳秀菁).

== See also ==
- Convention on the Elimination of All Forms of Discrimination Against Women
- Korean Council for the Women Drafted for Military Sexual Slavery by Japan
- Liu Huang A-tao
