= One Million Star =

- Logo
- Also known as: 超級星光大道; Super Star Avenue
- Presented by: Tao Ching-Ying (陶晶瑩)
- Country of origin: Republic of China (Taiwan)
- Original language: Mandarin
- No. of seasons: 7

Production
- Running time: 120 mins (Sundays from 20:00 to 22:00)

Original release
- Network: China Television (CTV)
- Release: 5 January 2007 – 13 March 2011

One Million Star (Chinese: 超級星光大道; pinyin: Chāojí Xīngguāng Dàdào; lit. 'Super Star Avenue') is a television singing competition in Taiwan broadcast on China Television (CTV). It debuted on 5 January 2007, filling the 10 pm to midnight time slot on Friday evenings. The show is hosted by Tao Ching-Ying (陶晶瑩) and is currently shown on Sundays from 8 to 10 pm. The aim of the show is to gather talented young singers and find the one who has the best qualities to become a superstar. One Million Star launched the music careers of Mandopop artists such as Yoga Lin, Aska Yang, Wong JingLun and Jam Hsiao.

In its debut year the show won Best Variety Programme and Best Host in a Variety Programme for Tao at the 42nd Golden Bell Awards. and has been nominated for both awards in 2008, 2009 and 2010. In 2011, the program branched out with another edition: Chinese Million Star, featuring contenders from Los Angeles, Malaysia, Singapore and Taiwan trying to make the cut for the preliminary quarter-finals, which take place in Taiwan. The show premiered on July 3, 2011.

== Rules ==
In the early auditions, hopeful contestants are screened by preliminary panels to be selected for singing talent. The audition process is long and highly competitive, with hundreds of candidates eliminated. Once they make it to the show, the contestants face different tasks every week that involve singing; the worst-performing individual is eliminated. The six finalists no longer face elimination, but are graded on their performance each week. The one who excels wins the grand prize: NT$1,000,000 and a studio recording contract.

== Season summary ==
Season Number	Premiere Date	Champion	1st Runner Up	2nd Runner-up	3rd Runner-up	Million Star Gang / Top 10 (Starting From the Season Champion)	Label Cooperation
Season 1	January 5, 2007	Yoga Lin (林宥嘉)	Judy Chou (周定緯)	Peter Pan (潘裕文)	Afalean Lu (盧學叡)	Yoga Lin (林宥嘉); Judy Chou (周定緯); Peter Pan (潘裕文); Afalean Lu (盧學叡); Miles Liu (劉明峰); Aska Yang (楊宗緯); Stanly Hsu (許仁杰); Eli Hsieh (謝震廷); Sharon Lee (李宣榕); Charks An (安伯政)	HIM International Music
Season 2	July 20, 2007	Yuming Lai (賴銘偉)	Rachel Liang (梁文音)	Uni Yie (葉瑋庭)	Quack Wu (吳忠明)	Yuming Lai (賴銘偉); Rachel Liang (梁文音); Uni Yie (葉瑋庭); Quack Wu (吳忠明); Annie Lin (林宜融); Pets Tseng (曾沛慈); Jane Huang (黃美珍); Queen Wei (魏如昀); Christina Lin (林佩瑤); Nana Lee (李千娜)	Universal Music Taiwan
Season 3	February 2, 2008	Lala Hsu (徐佳瑩)	Shennio Lin (林芯儀)	Ivy Li (黎礎寧)	Sammi Jian (簡鳳君)	*Lala Shu (徐佳瑩); Shennio Lin (林芯儀); Ivy Li (黎礎寧); Sammi Jian (簡鳳君); Shane Lai (賴聖恩); Wong JingLun (黃靖倫); Sugie Pan (潘嗣敬); Crystal Lin (林雨宣); Albert Wang (王彥博); Edward Tsai (蔡忠穎)	
Season 4	October 2008	Queenie Fang (方宥心)	Mark Chang (張心傑)	Micheal Lin (林鴻鳴)	Connie Kan (康禎庭)	Queenie Fang (方宥心); Mark Chang (張心傑); Michael Lin (林鴻鳴); Connie Kan (康禎庭); Jenny Liang (梁一貞); Ji O Son (孫碧娜); 吳德宏; Yvonne Chang (張涵雅); Leo Chan (陳樂軒); Ben Wu (吳勇濱)	
Season 5	April 3, 2009	Dennis Sun (孫自佑)	Rose Liu (劉明湘)	Celia Liang (梁曉珺)	Rachel Hsu (徐詠琳)	Dennis Sun (孫自佑); Rose Liu (劉明湘); Celia Liang (梁曉珺); Rachel Hsu (徐詠琳); Mrtting Lee (李杰宇); Ami Yang (楊駿文); Bala Zeng (曾梓淞); Eric Lin (林育澤); Victoria Wang (王璿); Marsa Hu (胡采書)	HIM International Music
Season 6	November 6, 2009	Hu Xia (胡夏)	Jenny Du (杜華瑾)	San Shuai (三帥)	Shanils Huang (黃郁善)	Hu Xia (胡夏); Jenny Du (杜華瑾); San Shuai (三帥); Shanils Huang (黃郁善); Brian Pien (邊品憲); OJ Zhang (張士堂); Ryan Su (蘇芷妤); Wayne Huang (黃偉晉); Vela "Blue" Chen (陳曼青); Howard Ceng Zhi (曾治豪)	Sony Music Entertainment
Star Legend	May 21, 2010	Janice Yan (閻奕格)	Rose Liu (劉明湘)	Uni Yie (葉瑋庭)	Mark Chang (張心傑)	Janice Yan (閻奕格); Rose Liu (劉明湘); Uni Yi (葉瑋庭); Mark Chang (張心傑); Queen Wei (魏如昀); Quack Wu (吳忠明); Connie Kan (康禎庭); David Lin (林道遠); Rachel Hsu (徐詠琳); Ami Yang (楊駿文)	
Season 7	August 27, 2010	Jess Lee (李佳薇)	Gary Sun (孫曉亮)	Wu Si Ai, Usay(舞思愛)	Christmas Bai (白潮洛蒙)	Jess Lee (李佳薇); Gary Sun (孫曉亮); Wu Si Ai, Usay(舞思愛); Christmas Bai (白潮洛蒙); Erika Liu (劉艾立); Pink Tan (陳珂冰); Hu Huai Lang (胡淮浪); Canon Chang (常佳寧); Sisi Shi (施旭婧); Wendy Wang (王雯)	Warner Music

== Season 1 ==
The format features five judges who not only critique the contestants' performances but guide them. The three regular judges are songwriter, singer and producer: Wei-Jen Yuan (袁惟仁), Kay Huang (黃韻玲) and famous stylist Roger. There will be two different guest judges every week. Some previous guest judges include famous singers Phil Chang (張宇), Winnie Hsin, 林志炫; producers 小蟲, 王治平; TV producer 王偉忠; entertainers 孫鵬, 郭子乾 and so on.

== Season 2 ==
The second season of "One Million Star" begins at the same time 9.30 GMT +8 in Taiwan on July the 20th.

== After competition ==
Season Number	Million Star Gang / Top 10	Activity
Season 1	Yoga Lin (林宥嘉)	2008: Album Released: Mystery (HIM International Music); 2009: Album Released: Senses Around (HIM International Music)
Season 1	Judy Chou (周定緯)	2010: Album Releasing: Sigma (HIM International Music)
Season 1	Peter Pan (潘裕文)	2009: Album Released: Dreamer (HIM International Music)
Season 1	Afalean Lu (盧學叡)	2007: Album Released: Afalean Lu's Debut Album (Sony BMG); 2009: Album Released: Love Me (Sony BMG); 2010: EP Released: Encountering Oneself (Avex Group)
Season 1	Miles Liu (劉明峰)	
Season 1	Aska Yang (楊宗緯)	2008: Album Released: Dove (Warner Music)
Season 1	Stanly Hsu (許仁杰)	2008: EP Released: Dream On (HIM International Music)
Season 1	Eli Hsieh (謝震廷)	2015: Album Released: Progress Reports (Full Entertainment Marketing Corporation); 2018: Album Released: Where Are We Going? (Full Entertainment Marketing Corporation)
Season 1	Sharon Lee (李宣榕)	Sony BMG; Book released: Miracle (奇蹟)
Season 1	Charks An (安伯政)	

Season Number	Million Star Gang / Top 10	Activity
Season 2	Yuming Lai (賴銘偉)	2008: Album Released: Live For You (Universal Music Taiwan); 2010: Album Released: Guardian (Universal Music Taiwan)
Season 2	Rachel Liang (梁文音)	2008: Album Released: Love Poems (Universal Music Taiwan); 2009: Album Released: Love, Has Always Existed (Universal Music Taiwan)
Season 2	Uni Yie (葉瑋庭)	Rock Records
Season 2	Quack Wu (吳忠明)	Rock Records
Season 2	Annie Lin (林宜融)	
Season 2	Pets Tseng (曾沛慈)	sang "夠愛" (Gou Ai) - ending theme song for K.O.3an Guo; 2014: Album Released: I'm Pets (Linfair Records Ltd.)
Season 2	Jane Huang (黃美珍)	2008: Album Released: Live For You (Universal Music Taiwan); 2010: Album Released: Guardian (Universal Music Taiwan)
Season 2	Queen Wei (魏如昀)	2008: Album Released: "Silly" (Universal Music Taiwan)
Season 2	Christina Lin (林佩瑤)	
Season 2	Lee Chien-na (李千娜)	

Season Number	Million Star Gang / Top 10	Activity
Season 3	Lala Shu (徐佳瑩)	2009: Album Released: "Lala's Debut Album" (AsiaMuse Entertainment); 2010: Album Released: "Limits" (AsiaMuse Entertainment)
Season 3	Shennio Lin (林芯儀)	
Season 3	Ivy Li (黎礎寧)	
Season 3	Sammi Jian (簡鳳君)	
Season 3	Shane Lai (賴聖恩)	
Season 3	Wong JingLun (黃靖倫)	2008: Album Released: "Jing's Note" (Warner Music); 2009: Album Released: "OK Man" (Warner Music)
Season 3	Sugie Pan (潘嗣敬)	
Season 3	Crystal Lin (林雨宣)	
Season 3	Albert Wang (王彥博)	
Season 3	Edward Tsai (蔡忠穎)	

Season Number	Million Star Gang / Top 10	Activity
Season 5	Dennis Sun (孫自佑)	HIM International Music
Season 5	Rose Liu (劉明湘)	HIM International Music
Season 5	Celia Liang (梁曉珺)	
Season 5	Rachel Hsu (徐詠琳)	
Season 5	Mrtting Lee (李杰宇)	2010: Album Releasing: Sigma (HIM International Music)
Season 5	Ami Yang (楊駿文)	
Season 5	Bala Zeng (曾梓淞)	
Season 5	Eric Lin (林育澤)	
Season 5	Victoria Wang (王璿)	
Season 5	Marsa Hu (胡采書)	

== Awards and nominations ==
Golden Bell Awards
Year	Number	Category	Nomination	Result	Ref
2007	42nd	Best Entertainment Variety Programme	One Million Star	Won	
2007	42nd	Best Host in an Entertainment Variety Programme	Tao Ching-Ying	Won	
2008	43rd	Best Entertainment Variety Programme	One Million Star	Nominated	
2008	43rd	Best Host in an Entertainment Variety Programme	Tao Ching-Ying	Nominated	
2009	44th	Best Variety Programme	One Million Star	Nominated	
2009	44th	Best Host in a Variety Programme	Tao Ching-Ying	Nominated	
2010	45th	Best Variety Programme	One Million Star	Nominated	
2010	45th	Best Host in a Variety Programme	Tao Ching-Ying	Nominated	

== See also ==
- Super Girl
- Super Boy
- Blossoming Flowers
- The Voice
- Chinese Million Star
