= Peter Pan (singer) =

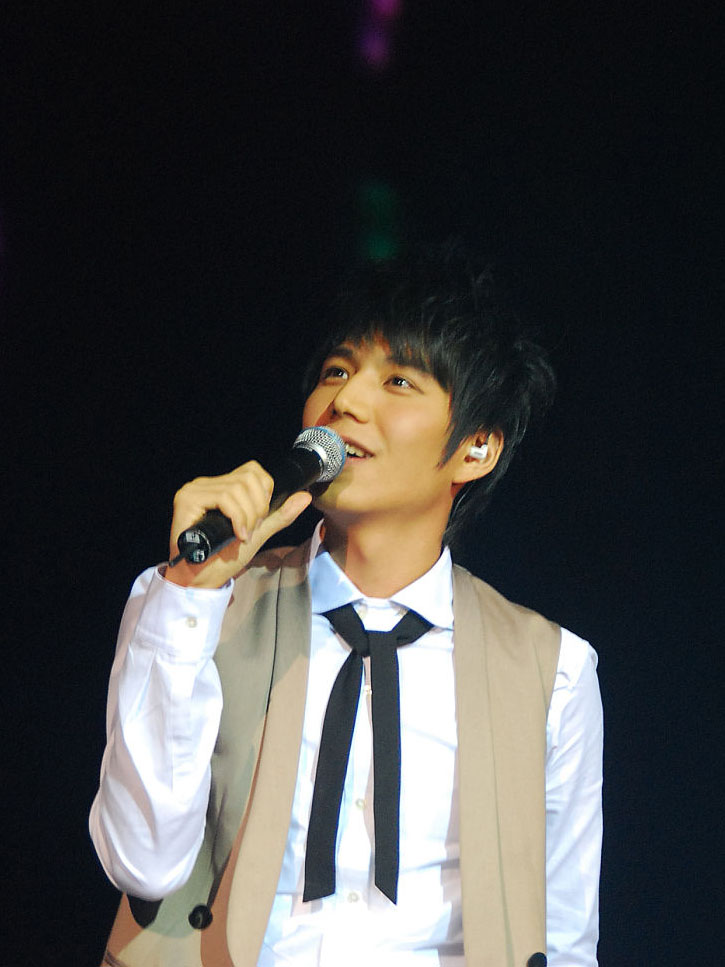
- Portrait of Pan Yuwen
- Born: 20 June 1984 (age 42); Taoyuan
- Education: Chinese Culture University
- Occupations: Singer, lyricist
- Years active: 2007–present

Chinese name
- Traditional Chinese: 潘裕文
Transcriptions
- Musical career
- Also known as: Prince Pan, Devil Pan, Farm Prince
- Genres: Mandopop
- Instrument: Vocals
- Labels: HIM International Music, Asia Muse Entertainment

Pan Yuwen (traditional Chinese: 潘裕文; born June 20, 1984) is a Taiwanese pop singer.

He has participated in singing competition shows such as One Million Star and Super Star.

== Career ==
In 2007, he participated in the first season of One Million Star, a singing competition show on CTV.

The media dubbed him, Yoga Lin, Zhou Dingwei, and Xu Renjie, all of whom were signed to HIM, as "Starlight Four".

In 2008, in addition to domestic singing activities, he also held concerts with other Starlight participants in Hong Kong, Singapore, and Malaysia. In June and July, he held a personal mini concert in Taichung and Taipei. Pan challenged himself by singing songs of different styles, such as Peter & Mary by Mayday and Black Tangerine by David Tao. On October 24, 2008, his first personal EP Summer Rain Poem was released.

On August 7, 2010, Pan won an award at the Metro Radio Mandarin Hits Music Awards was held in Hong Kong.

In June 2011, he participated in the Information Office-funded film and television programs - "A-Ming Shore Fishing", as the protagonist A-Ming.

On October 26, 2012, his second album Listen to clock was officially released.

On December 3, 2013, his digital single Thirst was released. This song is earned from his participation on the show Super Star I Want to Be a Singer after he lasted 11 rounds.

== Ambassador ==
In June 2010, he was selected by the Taoyuan City Government as the spokesperson for the “Taoyuan Upgrade to Municipality Become a Dreamer” event. At the 2010 Shanghai World Expo, he served as the spokesperson for the UITP Pavilion of the International Federation of Public Transport.
