= Yuan Wei-jen =

Taiwanese musician (1968–2026)

Yuan Wei-jen (Chinese: 袁惟仁; 24 June 1968 – 2 February 2026) was a Taiwanese singer-songwriter and music producer. Yuan rose to fame in 1991 as part of the duo Fanren with Mo Fan, winning the Golden Melody Award for Best Vocal Group twice. He later became one of the most influential producers in the Mandopop industry. He played a key role in establishing Na Ying as a major pop singer, producing hits including “Conquer,” “Just a Dream,” and “Awaken,” which helped her enter the Taiwanese market and become the first mainland Chinese singer to win Best Female Singer at the Golden Melody Awards in 2001. Yuan also composed the Mandarin version of “Stubborn,” one of Faye Wong's early career-defining works, and served as an early producer for girl group S.H.E. Yuan gained wider public recognition as a judge on talent show One Million Star and became a fixture on talent and variety shows in the late 2000s and early 2010s.

== Personal life ==
In 2002, Yuan married Yuan-chi Carolina Lu. They have a son, Yi Yuan, and a daughter, Rong Yuan. The couple divorced in 2016. After the divorce, Lu said on talk shows that the marriage had been strained by Yuan's 13-year-long infidelity, and that when their daughter was three months old, the other woman directly demanded her to leave, which Lu described as “the deepest wound” of her life. She also said that during the later years of the marriage she largely took sole responsibility for childcare, and that although Yuan had promised to provide child support after the divorce, he did not, leaving her to shoulder the family's expenses while raising their two children.

Yuan collapsed in Shanghai in 2018 after a fall that caused a brain hemorrhage. During emergency treatment, doctors discovered a brain tumor. After Yuan was hospitalized in Shanghai, Lu, his ex-wife, said she chose to set aside the past and visited him with their children. However, their then 15-year-old son refused to enter the hospital room. Yuan underwent surgery and returned to Taiwan for recuperation, but his condition worsened after a second fall in 2020, and he was declared to be in a vegetative state in 2022. In 2025, industry friends led by Phil Chang established a foundation to help cover his medical expenses. Yuan died on 2 February 2026 at the age of 57.

After Yuan's death in 2026, his son wrote on social media about his estranged father that for the past seven years he had “always used work as an excuse and couldn’t stay by your side — let’s call it even,” adding, “If we really do have a next life by accident, I hope we can once again be a passing father and son.” Lu also expressed regret after his death, writing that resolving related matters had required substantial expenses and that, in order to maintain her income, she had spoken on television about “the most unpleasant things between us,” which were widely circulated and led to public criticism of him, "and hope you can understand how difficult it was for me at the time.”

== Discography ==
With Mo Fan (莫凡), as a member of the pop duet Nobody (凡人)

- Cuckoo's Dusk (杜鵑鳥的黃昏, 1991)
- How Should I Keep You (我要用什麼樣的方式留你, 1992)
- Let's Hear Me Sing a Song (大夥聽我唱支歌, 1993)
- Willing (心甘情願, 1994)
- Appeal (上訴, 1994)
- Unlucky Duo (難兄難弟, 1995)

As a solo artist

- Yuan Wei Jen (2000)
- You Don't Know Me (你不知道的我, 2005)
- Acoustic Guitar (木吉他, 2014)

== Songs written for other artists ==
- For Faye Wong: "Zhimi Buhui" (執迷不悔, title track of No Regrets), "Guoyan Yunyan" (過眼雲煙, from Lovers & Strangers), "Xuanmu" (旋木, from To Love)
- For Na Ying: "Zhengfu" (征服), "Meng Xing Le" (夢醒了), "Meng Yi Chang" (夢一場)
- For Sammi Cheng: "Beipan" (背叛, from Worth It), "Quexi" (缺席)

Yuan also wrote songs for Wang Zheng, Alan Dawa Dolma, Chao Chuan, Chyi Chin, Eric Moo, Matilda Tao, Jacky Wu, Tanya Chua, Maggie Chiang, Dream Girls, Hebe Tien, Fish Leong, Rene Liu, Han Geng, A-Mei, and Jason Zhang.

== Awards and nominations ==
Year	#	Awards	Category	Work	Artist	Result
1992	4th	Golden Melody Awards	Best Singing Group	How Should I Keep You (我要用什麼樣的方式留你)	Nobody (凡人)	Nominated
1993	5th	Golden Melody Awards	Best Singing Group	Let's Hear Me Sing a Song (大夥聽我唱支歌)	Nobody (凡人)	Won
1994	6th	Golden Melody Awards	Best Singing Group	Willing (心甘情願)	Nobody (凡人)	Won
1999	10th	Golden Melody Awards	Best Composer	"Zhengfu" (征服)	Na Ying	Nominated
1999	10th	Golden Melody Awards	Best Lyricist	"Zhengfu" (征服)	Na Ying	Nominated
2000	11th	Golden Melody Awards	Best Lyricist	"Wo Bian Le" (我變了)	Matilda Tao	Nominated
2001	12th	Golden Melody Awards	Best Male Vocalist Mandarin	Yuan Wei Jen	Yuan Wei-jen	Nominated
