= Jess Lee (Malaysian singer) =

Malaysian musician (born 1988)

- 李佳薇
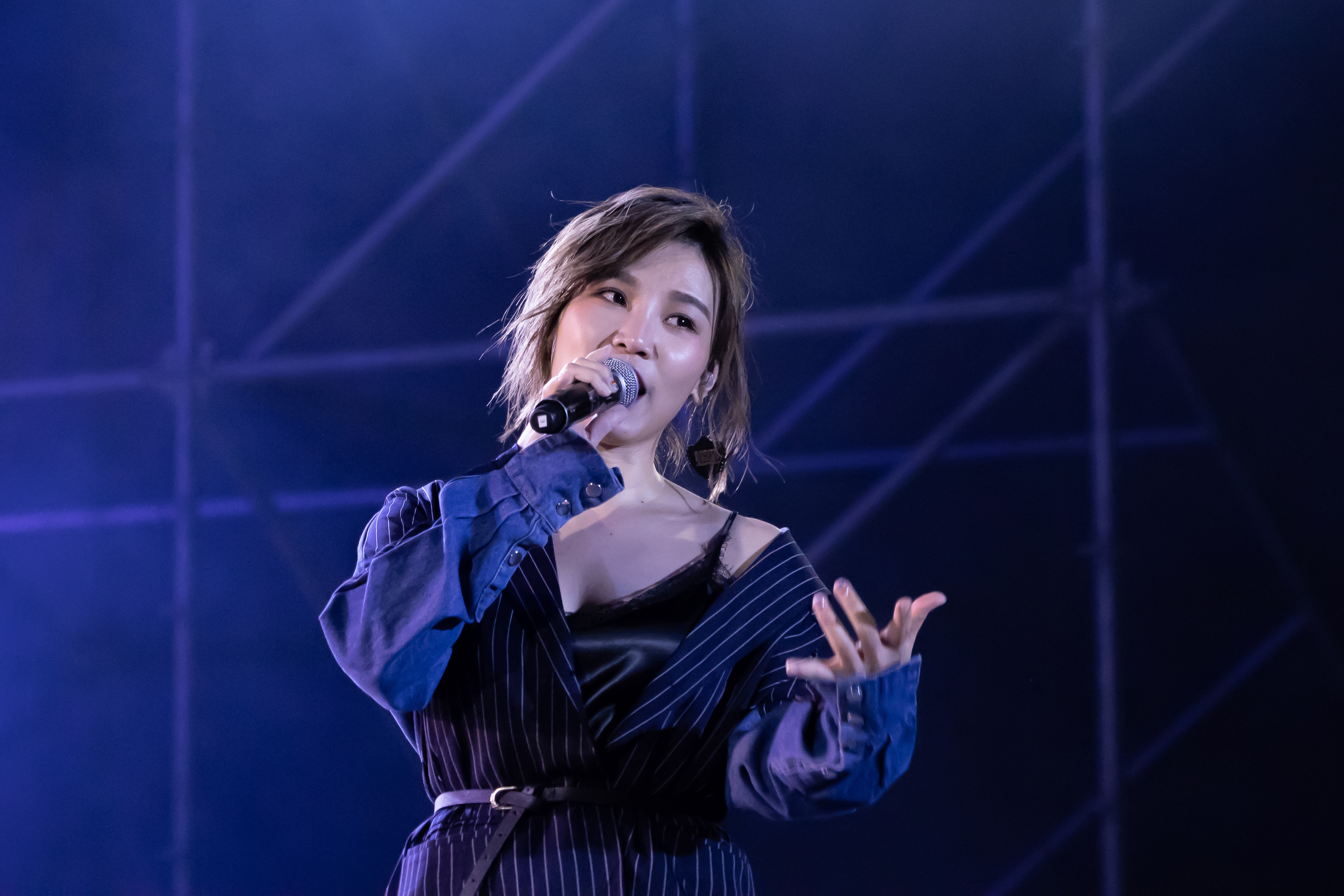
- 2019
- Born: Lee Kar Wei; 1 June 1988 (age 38); Seremban, Negeri Sembilan, Malaysia
- Other names: Iron Lung Queen, Soaring Diva, Storm Diva, Power Diva
- Education: Seremban Peihua Primary School; Seremban Zhenhua High School; National University of Malaysia Department of Chemistry (Bachelor); National Taiwan University Department of Chemistry
- Occupations: Singer, Stage actor, Host
- Years active: 2011–present
- Notable work: 《煎熬》; 《大火》; 《BEAUTIFUL》; 《像天堂的懸崖》; 《忍不住想念》; 《鍊愛》
- Relatives: Kaia Lee（Sister）
- Musical career
- Also known as: Jess Lee
- Origin: Taiwan
- Genre: Mandopop
- Label: Warner Music Taiwan (2011-2020)

Jess Lee Kar Wei (Chinese: 李佳薇; pinyin: Lǐ Jiāwēi; Jyutping: Lei5 Gaai1 Mei4; Pe̍h-ōe-jī: Lí Ka-bî; Pha̍k-fa-sṳ: Lí Kâi-vì, born 1 June 1988) is a Malaysian Chinese female singer. In 2010, she participated in the seventh One Million Star hosted by Taiwan Central Television. On January 30, 2011, she became the first Malaysian winner of Chinese Million Star. At the same time, she achieved the record of most perfect scores in the history of the program, four consecutive perfect scores, and obtained a recording contract with Warner Music Taiwan, releasing her first album in the same year. She is known for her high-pitched singing voice and wide vocal range, earning her the nickname "Iron Lung Queen".

== Early life ==
Jess Lee was born in Seremban, Negeri Sembilan, Malaysia on 1 June 1988. Her ancestral home is Meizhou, Meizhou City, Guangdong. She has a Hakka background.

Lee learned opera and Chinese folk songs from her vocal teacher since she was a child (later she mainly focused on folk songs). She started learning vocal music when she was 8 years old. When she was 13 years old, she told her teacher that she wanted to learn pop songs. The vocal teacher told her that the interpretation methods of folk songs and pop songs were quite different, and she had to choose one to concentrate on practicing singing. As a result, she chose to learn both at the same time, starting with English pop songs and then Chinese pop songs.

Lee skipped from the third grade to the fifth grade of an elementary school. She obtained A in all subjects in the Malaysian Lower Secondary Assessment (PMR) and the Malaysian Certificate of Education (SPM). In 2004, Lee participated in the singing talent show Malaysian Idol and was eliminated because she forgot her lyrics. In 2008, she participated in the Astro Star Quest, and also won Top Three in the "Malaysian National Singing Competition". In 2010, in order to participate in the seventh One Million Star, Taiwan's famous singing talent show of China Television, Lee came to Taiwan to become a visiting student in the Department of Chemistry of National Taiwan University. During the competition, Lee's outstanding performance was praised by the judges, and she scored a perfect score of 30 in the last four rounds. She eventually became the first Malaysian champion of Chinese Million Star and the first player to score perfect scores four times in a row. Later, she signed a contract with Warner Music Taiwan to become its singer.

== Career ==
=== 2011-2013: "Thanks to My Lover" ===
On 16 September 2011, Lee released her first solo album "Thanks to My Lover" (感謝愛人). The title song "Torture" in the album is interpreted with her high-pitched 16-degree singing voice. The MV for this song became the first MV banned by YouTube due to large-scale sex scenes. It exceeded 1 million views in a few days and became a topic of discussion. It also reached 10 million clicks.

Lee is very popular in Malaysia. She once won three awards at the 3rd My Astro Supreme Popular Chart Awards Ceremony hosted by Malaysia's well-known radio and television stations (MY and Astro): she won "My Astro" for "Divider" Supreme Golden Melody Award", and also won the "My Astro Supreme Newcomer Award" and "My Astro Supreme Popularity Award". In 2012, she was nominated for the "Best Newcomer Award" at the 23rd Golden Melody Awards. She sang an adapted version of her famous song "Torture" at the Little Arena (Golden Melody Awards Ceremony) and became an instant hit. She was the most popular newcomer nominee for the award that night. In the end Although he didn't win any awards, he became a hit among newcomers. In the same year, Lee was successfully shortlisted for the "Newcomer Recommendation Award" of the Malaysian Entertainment Association Awards and successfully won the award (gold award), which is extremely popular.

In 2013, Lee went to China to participate in Hunan Television's The X Factor talent show, but it was reported that she withdrew from the competition.

=== 2014-2015: "Heaven/Cliff" ===
On 17 March 2014, Lee released her second solo album "Heaven/Cliff", and the first hit song "Cliff Like Heaven" sparked discussion. In the "Suffocation Version" trailer released online on February 27 of the same year, the scene of her singing while wearing a plastic bag made netizens think that the action was dangerous and might lead to inappropriate imitation. On March 6, the "Smothering Love Edition" MV was released, containing large-scale sex scenes. The MV exceeded one million views on YouTube within one week, and Warner Music called Lee the "Queen of Taboo Theme Songs". However, due to the controversial content standards of the song's MV, the NCC sent letters to major TV stations, stipulating that the MV can only be broadcast between 11pm and 6am. On March 16, the banned full version of the micro-film "Like the Cliff of Heaven" was released. The film has been viewed by more than 40 million people on YouTube. In addition, "Cliffs Like Heaven" became the opening theme of the Korean dramas "The Master's Sun" and "The Perfect Nanny" aired in Taiwan. It was well received and has captured four major music channels: physical, digital, telecommunications, and radio. Win more than 25 rankings.

Starting from May of the same year, Lee participated in AHTV's launch of the second season of the Chinese singer music battle reality show "Mad for Music" (我为歌狂); and the fifth wave of the hit song "Can't Help Missing" included in the Heaven/Cliff" album, It rarely became the opening or ending theme of Korean dramas "Empress Ki", "Good Doctor" and "The Hundred Years Bride" broadcast at the same time at 9 o'clock on three different TV stations in Taiwan. It once became the number one song in the digital music download list.

On June 1 of the same year, Lee participated in the "Female Vocals" singing test of the "Rockschool International Popular Music Examination" which was introduced to Taiwan and became popular in Europe. Li sang four English songs and one of his own Chinese works "Like the Cliffs of Heaven" in half an hour, and finally scored 98 points. The British examiner later learned that she was a singer and thought that although the Chinese songs she prepared were a little dull compared to the English songs, the emotional performance was still very good. He also said that no one can sing perfectly, and a score of 98 is already close to a perfect score.

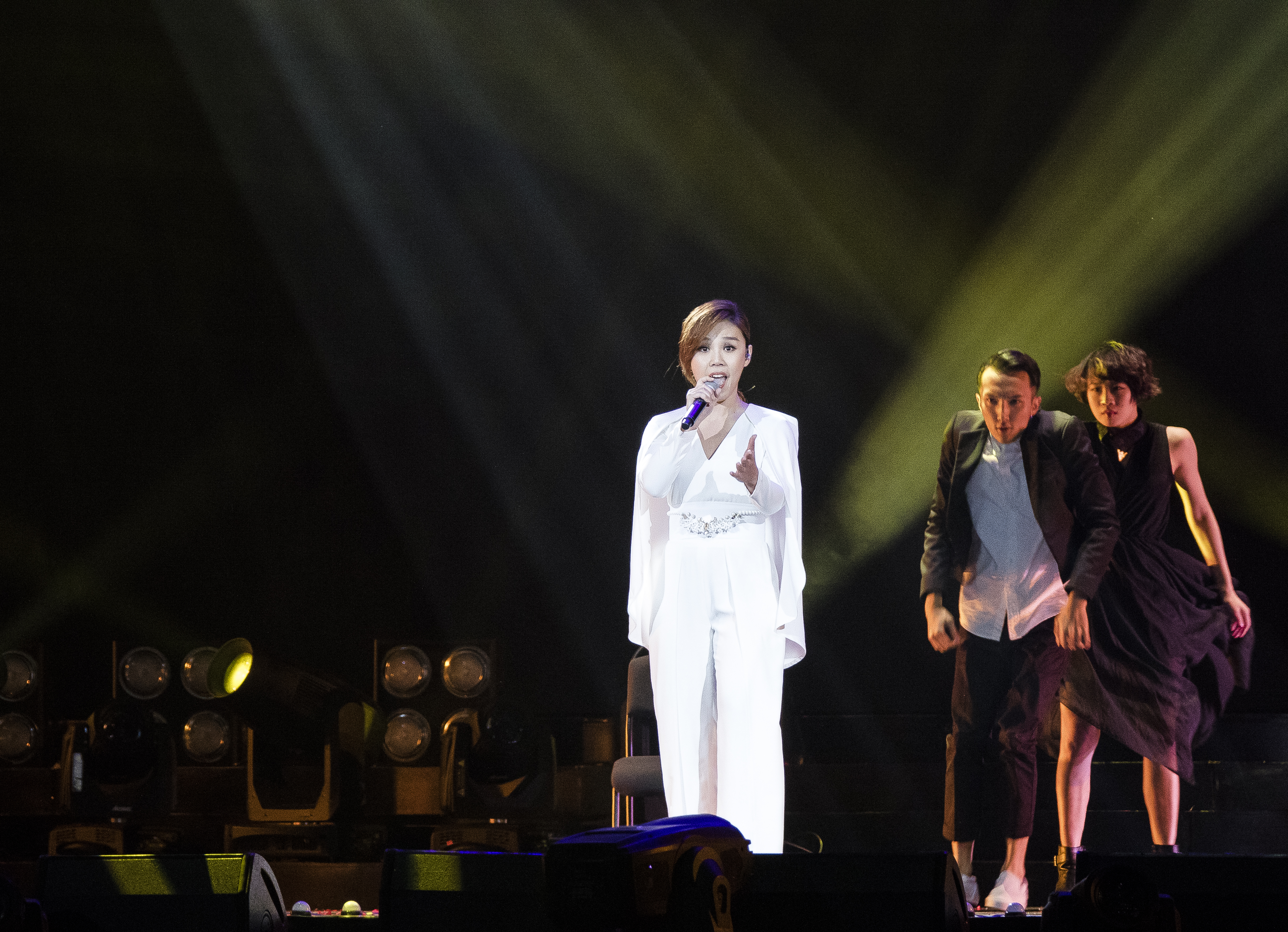
Jess Lee performed on the 2015 KKBOX Billboard

On 27 February 2015, Lee participated in the third season of the Hunan Television's program I Am a Singer and became the last contestant in the ninth week. She received 214 votes and ranked fifth, and ranked fourth with A-Lin (who received 215 votes) and lost by one vote. In September of the same year, Jess Lee participated in the Jiangxi TV's program The Playlist.

=== 2016-2017: "Love Storm" ===
The third album "Love Storm" was released on May 6, 2016. This album is the first album tailor-made for Lee's personal characteristics. The singing interpretation and music style are more diverse, and it contains 12 new songs. Representing 12 astronomical observations, the album topped the album sales rankings of Taiwan's three major physical album sales channels: G-Music, "Five Major Record Stores" and "Guangnan Wholesale Chain Store". The album's first hit song "Blizzard" has been completely revamped in visual style and musical style. Jess Lee has also escaped the fate of being "masked" in the title songs of the previous two albums, showing her "face" for the first time and serving as the heroine in the MV. Emphasizing more on personal style; the second wave of hit songs "Chain Love" became the theme song of three dramas broadcast in Taiwan, including the Chinese TV series "The Legend of Miyue", the Korean dramas "She is Beautiful" and "My Daughter, Qin April". Ending song. On May 26 of the same year, Jess Lee participated in a corporate visit organized by POP Radio and went to the game company "Zhiguan Technology" to sing and promote the album. The song also topped the number one list of digital music charts such as KKBOX and Omusic. On June 1, Jess Lee released the third wave of the MV for the title song "Nostalgia", and within one month of its release, the "Storm of Love" album has been sold on four major music channels at home and abroad: physical, digital, telecommunications, and radio. A total of 67 rankings were won. On June 8, the fourth wave of the MV for the title song "I Dare You" was released. In the MV, Jess Lee challenged herself to dance for the first time. On June 9, she held the "Jess Lee's Love Storm" new song concert at the New Taipei City Civic Plaza. This was Jess Lee 's first large-scale outdoor concert.

On August 9 of the same year, Lee released "Princess Jiawei Suite" on Chinese Valentine's Day, and played the roles of Rapunzel from Tangled, Hua Mulan from Mulan, and Anna and Ella from Frozen. There are a total of 7 classic princess characters including Shakespeare, Belle in Beauty and the Beast, Pocahontas in Pocahontas and Snow White in Snow White; her high voice and singing skills have been praised by the outside world as "completely explosive" singer". On September 12 of the same year, Jess Lee won the "Best Female Singer Award" at the 2016 AIM Chinese Music Awards Ceremony.

In 2017, Lee embarked on her first solo concert tour "Storm of Love Tour", which visited Shanghai, Nanjing and Beijing respectively.

=== 2018-2019: "The Opposite of Yes" ===
On 8 June 2018, Lee released her solo fourth album "The Opposite of Yes", featuring the official Chinese theme song "HEY BABY You're Mine", which she previously sang for the movie "Dear First Love", with the first wave of the hit song "The Opposite of Yes". In June 2019, she was awarded with the HITO Good Sound Award at the 2019 HITO Pop Music Awards organized by HitFm.

=== 2020-2021: Multi-field career and slash life ===
From 3 January 2020, she served as the regular host of the TTV music singing program "台視17唱" together with artists such as Mickey Huang, Kenny Khoo, Nine Chen and other artists served as regular hosts of the show. From 28 February 2021, she participated in the second "All Star Sports Day" of TTV's sports competition reality program and was selected to become a member of the blue team. During the past two years, Jess Lee also worked part-time in the real estate industry and actually worked as a housing agent. She has also invested in the development of skin care products and serves as the founder of the "Je Dare 5D Magnetic Series" skin care products.

=== 2022-present: "Happiness" ===
On 19 July 2022, Lee collaborated with the world's top 100 DJ 22 Bullets to collaborate on the electronic dance song "Blooming", which was officially released. On 26 July 2022, the fifth music album "Happiness" was released. On 2 September 2022, the mobile game "Blooming" was officially released. "Mortal Cultivation of Immortality M" mobile game theme song "Mortal People Are Extraordinary". On 28 December 2022, the album "Happiness" won the "Top 20 Chinese Album of the Year Award" at the 2022 APMA Asian Pop Music Awards. On 9 May 2023, the album "Happiness" won the 5th BraVo Awards International Professional Music in Russia. At the award ceremony, she won the "Best Chinese Singer Award".

== Musical works ==
=== Albums ===
Album #	Album Information	Songs
1st	First Album Thank You My Lover《感謝愛人》: Release date: 16 September 2011; Language: Mandarin; Record company: Warner Music Taiwan	Songs: 1. 送你分手; 2. 煎熬 （韓劇《城市獵人》主題曲／《燦爛人生》片頭曲）; 3. 分隔線; 4. 也好也不好; 5. 撤 6. 大火; 7. 鞋 8. 離場; 9. 感謝愛人; 10. 如果愛是星光
2nd	Second Album Heaven/Cliff《天堂/悬崖》: Release date: 17 March 2014; Language: Mandarin; Record company: Warner Music Taiwan	Songs: 1. 像天堂的懸崖（韓劇《主君的太陽》／《超完美褓姆》片頭曲）; 2. 強求; 3. 忍不住想念（韓劇《奇皇后》片尾曲、韓劇《Good Doctor善良醫生》／《百年新娘》片頭曲）; 4. 笑到流淚（韓劇《繼承者們》片尾曲）; 5. 真話; 6. 紋身; 7. 微戀愛; 8. 快快說愛我; 9. 納愛來; 10. 誰的愛; 11. 都會好的
3rd	Third Album Love Storm《愛的風暴》: 發行日期：6 May 2016; Language: Mandarin; Record company: Warner Music Taiwan	Songs: 1. 你敢我就敢; 2. 暴風雪; 3. 鍊愛（電視劇《羋月傳》片尾曲、韓劇《她很漂亮》／《我的女兒琴四月》片尾曲）; 4. 念舊; 5. Only One I Care; 6. 愛情來敲門; 7. 擁抱不算愛情; 8. 妄想者; 9. 學會不堅強; 10. 佔據幸福（電視劇《一見不鍾情》插曲）; 11. 別來無恙（電視劇《千金女賊》插曲）; 12. 最好的幸福（電視劇《千金女賊》插曲）
4th	Fourth Album The Opposite of Yes《相反的是》: 發行日期：8 June 2018; Language: Mandarin; Record company: Warner Music Taiwan	Songs: 1. 反派情人; 2. 一樣的是（電視劇《那年花開月正圓》片尾曲、韓劇《親愛的恩東》片頭曲）; 3. 逃亡; 4. 好強（韓劇《卞赫的愛情》片頭曲）; 5. 二手眼淚; 6. 靠心的海岸; 7. Hey Baby 你是我的 (電影《親愛的初戀》中文主題曲）; 8. 裝睡的人; 9. 週年紀念; 10. 叫快樂來找我
5th	Fifth Album Happiness 《痛快》: Digital release date: 26 July 2022 Physical release date: 5 August 2022; Language: Mandarin; Record company: 黑籟音樂	Songs: 1. 飆 2. 那一瞬間; 3. 追心者; 4. 飛 5. 縱火者; 6. 而你還是不愛了; 7. 墜落（電影《民雄鬼屋》主題曲）; 8. 無害; 9. 她問; 10. 光

=== Singles ===
Note: This list contains singles not included in the album

=== Compose songs ===
Singer	Song title	Album	Nature	Compose part	Release date
Kaia Lee	《口語化》	《開放世界》	And Roger Yo游政豪、Kaia Lee李佳歡co-creation	Music	2019.11.08
Jess Lee	《追心者》	《痛快》	AndOliver Kim、吳易緯co-creation	Lyrics, Music	2022.06.21
Zhang Ze	《假裝沒有愛你》	Single	And吕孝廷co-creation	Music	2023.12.20

== Concert ==
- Album new song release conference
- Small and medium ticketed concerts

== Film and Television works ==
=== Movie ===
Premiere Day	Title	Role	Nature	Co-actor	Director
13 December 2012	《金童玉女》	Lǐjiāwēi	Guest Appearance	Mike He, 劉久溥、Wang Daoyi、吳上豪、Chris Tong、葉良財、黃俊淇	Ah Niu

== Host works ==
=== TV ===
Year	Channel	Program name	Host
2019~2020	Taiwan Television	台視17唱	Mickey Huang, Kenny Khoo, Nine Chen
2021	Taiwan Television	All Star Sports Day	Fixed team for the second season

== Variety show ==
- 2021年Chinese Television System, SET News, Vidol, YouTube Channel live broadcast "Live Asia Super Weekend Scene" Guest feat Emma Wu
- 2022年Mr. Player Guest feat Emma Wu
- 2023年Astro Classic Golden Melody Judge
