= Wang Zheng (singer) =

Chinese singer

Wang Zheng (Chinese: 王筝; born 3 January 1985) is a female Chinese pop singer and composer from Xi'an, China.

Her debut was when she was only six years old.

== Albums ==
- 春风 Spring breeze（CD） 7 May 2004
- 我们都是好孩子 We were all good children （CD） 20 April 2006
- 哭过的天空 The sky that cried （CD） 24 July 2007
- 没有人比我更爱你 No one loves you more than I do（CD）18 November 2008
- 钝悟 Blunt feeling（CD）6 January 2011
