= William Wei discography =

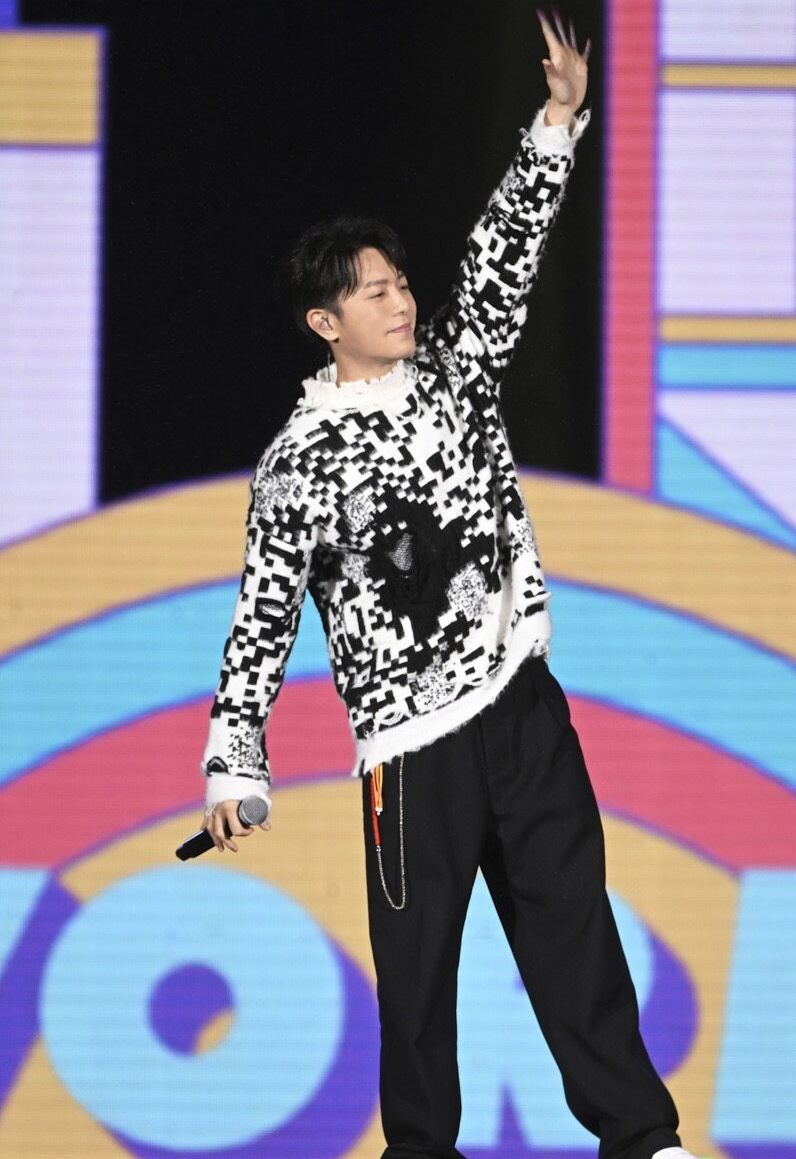
- Wei in 2023
- Studio albums: 7
- EPs: 2
- Live albums: 1
- Singles: 36
- Music videos: 65

Taiwanese singer-songwriter William Wei has released seven studio albums, one live album, two extended plays, 36 singles. Wei makes his musical debut on CTS variety show Happy Sunday (快樂星期天). Subsequently, he signed a multi-album contract with Linfair Records and released his first EP, Slowly Wait (慢慢等) in 2009. In 2010, Wei released his self-titled debut album, William Wei. In the following year, Wei held his first major concert at the Taipei International Convention Center, and released his first live album, The Fleeing of a Two-Legged Bookcase.

In 2012, Wei released his second EP, The Bird Who Saved The World, and his sophomore album, Someone Is Waiting. Wei's third studio album, Journey Into The Night, was released in 2014 and was inspired by the Ang Lee's movie, Life of Pi. Wei's fourth studio album, It All Started From An Intro, was released on 16 August 2016. After almost 4 years, Wei released his fifth studio album, Sounds of My Life on 29 April 2020. He released his sixth studio album, which is his first full-length English album, I'm More Sober When I'm Drunk on 24 December 2021.

== Albums ==
=== Studio albums ===
Title	Album details	Peak chart positions
Title	Album details	TWN
William Wei (韋禮安首張同名創作專輯)	Released: 4 June 2010; Label: Linfair Records; Formats: CD, digital download, streaming	—
Someone Is Waiting (有人在等)	Released: 3 August 2012; Label: Linfair Records; Formats: CD, digital download, streaming	4
Journey into the Night (有所畏)	Released: 25 March 2014; Label: Linfair Records; Formats: CD, digital download, streaming	2
It All Started from an Intro (硬戳)	Released: 16 August 2016; Label: Linfair Records; Formats: CD, digital download, streaming	—
Sounds of My Life	Released: 29 April 2020; Label: The Orchard; Formats: CD, digital download, streaming	—
I'm More Sober When I'm Drunk	Released: 24 December 2021; Label: The Orchard; Formats: CD, digital download, streaming	—
Good Afternoon, Good Evening and Goodnight (明天再见)	Released: 9 September 2022; Label: The Orchard; Formats: CD, digital download, streaming	—

=== Live albums ===
Title	Album details
The Fleeing of a Two-Legged Bookcase (兩腳書櫥的逃亡 演唱會Live)	Released: 3 June 2011; Label: Linfair Records; Formats: CD, digital download, streaming

== Extended plays ==
Title	Album details
Slowly Wait (慢慢等)	Released: 13 March 2009; Label: Linfair Records; Formats: CD, digital download, streaming
The Bird Who Saved the World (什麼鳥日子)	Released: 15 January 2012; Label: Linfair Records; Formats: CD, digital download, streaming

== Singles ==
=== As lead artist ===
Title	Year	Notes
"We'll Never Know"	2012	
"Driftwood" (漂流木)	2012	Mandarin Theme song for movie 'Upside Down' (顛倒世界)
"By Your Side" (在你身邊)	2013	Soundtrack for television series 'The Pursuit of Happiness' (愛的生存之道) and 2014 endorsement theme song for Cotton USA (美國棉)
"Wolves" (狼)	2014	
"May Have Been" (似曾)	2015	Theme song for theatrical play 'What is Sex?' (紅樓夢)
"Girl" (女孩)	2015	Theme song for concert 'Free That Girl' (放開那女孩) and soundtrack for television series 'Baby Daddy' (長不大的爸爸)
"Don't Say" (別說沒愛過)	2015	Soundtrack for television series 'To the Dearest Intruder' (致，第三者)
"Play Game" (玩遊戲)	2015	Endorsement theme song for Microsoft Office 365
"Mirror of Sanctity" (崑崙鏡)	2015	Endorsement theme song for ARPG mobile game 'Xuan-Yuan Sword: Mirror of Sanctity' (軒轅劍之崑崙鏡)
"Single" (一個人)	2016	Soundtrack for television series 'Shia Wa Se' (幸福不二家)
"Live For You" (為了你活)	2016	Soundtrack for television series 'Nie Xiaoqian' (聶小倩)
"Think of You First" (第一個想到你)	2016	Soundtrack for television series 'Refresh Man' (後菜鳥的燦爛時代)
"Luvin' U"	2016	2016 endorsement theme song for Cotton USA (美國棉)
"Intro"	2016	
"Once Familiar With The Scenery" (風景舊曾諳) (with Claire Kuo)	2016	Soundtrack for television series 'General and I' (孤芳不自賞)
"Fool Loves Me" (傻瓜愛我)	2016	Soundtrack for television series 'Guardian of Beauty' (守護麗人)
"Sharing Is Joy" (分享快樂)	2017	Endorsement theme song for Pringles
"Love Is Like Air" (愛如空氣)	2017	Soundtrack for television series 'Master Healing' (復合大師)
"By My Side" (身旁)	2017	Soundtrack for television series 'Blind Date' (盲約)
"You Don't Need To Know" (不需要知道)	2017	Soundtrack for television series 'My Dear Boy' (我的男孩)
"Mediterranean Sun" (陽光地中海)	2018	Endorsement theme song for Hai Zhi Yan (海之言)
"Anytime is Happy Time" (with Ella Chen)	2018	Endorsement theme song for Taiwan Beer
"Fresh Up" (清爽 UP)	2019	Endorsement theme song for Hai Zhi Yan (海之言)
"At Thirty" (而立)	2019	Theme song for concert world tour 'At Thirty' (而立)
"Amphibian" (雙棲動物)	2020	Cover of Tanya Chua classic song for 拾憶錄 special project
"Cat Republic" (貓咪共和國)	2020	
"Best Meal in the World" (一口一口)	2020	
"Marry Me" (請你嫁給我)	2020	Soundtrack for television series 'Adventure of the Ring' (戒指流浪記)
"Just Stay with Me" (因為是你)	2021	Soundtrack for television series 'Tears on Fire' (火神的眼淚)
"Suddenly" (忽然)	2021	
"Mr. Tambourine Man"	2021	Cover of Bob Dylan
"Cheap Love" (with Ben&Ben)	2021	
"Red Scarf"	2021	Soundtrack for movie 'Till We Meet Again' (月老)
"Red Scarf" (Korean version) (만약)	2022	Soundtrack for movie 'Till We Meet Again' (月老) Korean release
"Red Scarf" (Japanese version) (赤い糸)	2022	Soundtrack for movie 'Till We Meet Again' (月老) Japanese release

== Other appearances ==
=== Appearances in soundtrack albums ===
Title	Released	Album	Label
Don't Ask Me (別問我)	30 June 2011	Hayate the Combat Butler - Original Soundtrack (旋風管家 電視原聲帶)	Linfair Records
Still (還是會)	18 October 2011	I May Not Like You - Original Soundtrack (我可能不會愛你 電視原聲帶)	Linfair Records
By Your Side (在你身邊)	21 November 2013	The Pursuit of Happiness - Original Soundtrack (愛的生存之道 電視原聲帶)	Linfair Records

=== Appearances in albums by other artists ===
Title	Released	Album	Label
Another Sunny Day (又是豔陽天) with Claire Kuo	25 August 2011	Another She (陪著我的時候想著她) by Claire Kuo	Linfair Records
How Have You Been (別來無恙) with FanFan	9 January 2016	Fanfan's Time to Give Thanks (范范的感恩節) by FanFan	Linfair Records
Game Bro (遊戲Bro) with Nine Chen and Wang Shun	4 October 2019	PASS (過) by Nine Chen	Rock Records
Never Again (再也不要) with Nine Chen	11 December 2019	PASS (過) by Nine Chen	Rock Records
On The Way with Hoo Leeger & NYK	19 January 2021	On The Way by Hoo Leeger	Sony Music
Favourite Ringtone (鬧鐘與愛歌)with PoeTek	6 May 2022	PRO by PoeTek	Sony Music

=== Others ===
Title	Released	Remarks
City Maze (城市迷宮)	1 May 2010	Song from Shanghai Expo 2010 Musical, Window of the city (城市之窗)
Listen to Me, Tien Kong (天公啊 聽我)	14 September 2012	Theme song for Hsinchu Taiwan Pavilion Expo Park
Flaming Beacon (烽火) with Lala Hsu and Europa Huang	2 August 2014	Tribute song for the victims of 2014 Kaohsiung gas explosions
My Sun (自己的太陽) with Claire Kuo, Rainie Yang, Shin, Shang Wenjie, Yisa Yu, Vision Wei, Chen Chusheng and Hua Chenyu	2 August 2014	Theme song for 12th MusicRadio "Going to School" (我要上學) Charity Event
Queen Medley with Alycia Marie, Ani Lorak, Ayumu Yamashita, Bradlee, Bully, Mateus Carrilho, Connie Isla, Curricé, Daniel J. Layton, Denise Rosenthal, Ekin Beril, Joshua Simon, Jugs Jugueta, Laura Tobón, Stan Walker and Thomas	23 October 2018	Tribute song for Queen as part of Bohemian Rhapsody Global Influencer Program.
Green (綠色)	26 October 2020	Cover of Shirley Chen classic song for 音樂好朋友 special project
2021 Hand in Hand (2021手牽手) with Hebe Tien, Wu Qing-feng, Li Quan, JJ Lin, Shi Shi, Soft Lipa, One-Fang, E.SO, Tan Weiwei and Tarcy Su	5 June 2021	Tribute song to healthcare workers and in support of COVID-19 relief

== Music videos ==
=== As main artist ===
Title	Year	Artist(s)	Director(s)	Ref
Have or Have Not (有沒有)	May 2010	William Wei	徐筠庭	
Because of Love (因為愛)	June 2010	William Wei	徐筠庭	
Slowly Wait (慢慢等)	June 2010	William Wei	邱柏翰, 鄒奕笙	
Good Weather (好天氣)	July 2010	William Wei	邱柏翰, 鄒奕笙	
Cloudy Sunflower (陰天的向日葵)	August 2010	William Wei	黃中平	
The Fleeing of a Two-Legged Bookcase (兩腳書櫥的逃亡)	August 2010	William Wei	黃中平	
Why Life (外·賴)	May 2011	William Wei	邱柏翰	
Hostage (人質)	May 2011	William Wei		
Don't Ask Me (別問我)	July 2011	William Wei	張清峰	
Still (還是會)	November 2011	William Wei	張清峰	
The Day of Bird (鳥日子)	April 2012	William Wei	邱柏翰, 鄒奕笙	
We'll Never Know	July 2012	William Wei	程安德	
Still Loving You (還是愛著你)	August 2012	William Wei	林孝謙, 呂安弦	
Heartbreak (心碎心醉)	August 2012	William Wei	鄭有傑	
Tired (累)	August 2012	William Wei	陳宏一	
Someone Is Waiting For Me (有人在等我)	September 2012	William Wei	張家維	
Listen to Me, Tien Kong (天公啊 聽我)	September 2012	William Wei	黃中平	
Wolves (狼)	March 2014	William Wei	比爾賈	
Mask (面具)	March 2014	William Wei	比爾賈	
By Your Side (在你身邊)	April 2014	William Wei	黃中平	
Treasure Island (金銀島)	April 2014	William Wei (feat. MATZKA)	許智彥	
Drained (江郎)	June 2014	William Wei	徐筠庭	
Sinking Ship (沈船)	September 2014	William Wei	黃中平	
Girl (女孩)	June 2015	William Wei	許智彥	
Play Game (玩遊戲)	September 2015	William Wei	許智彥	
Mirror of Sanctity (崑崙鏡)	October 2015	William Wei	小豪艾倫	
Don't Say (別說沒愛過)	November 2015	William Wei	小豪艾倫	
Luvin' U	May 2016	William Wei	陳映之	
Intro	July 2016	William Wei	Hi-Organic	
Think Of You First (第一個想到你)	August 2016	William Wei	Richie Jen (任賢齊)	
If We Meet Again (如果再見)	September 2016	William Wei	黃中平	
What You Think of Me (在意)	November 2016	William Wei	Hi-Organic	
Once Familiar With The Scenery (風景舊曾諳)	December 2016	William Wei (with Claire Kuo)	-	
Sharing Is Joy (分享快樂)	April 2017	William Wei	Chun Chieh Chen (陳俊傑)	
You Don't Need To Know (不需要知道)	February 2018	William Wei	小豪艾倫	
Anytime Is Happy Time	August 2018	William Wei (with Ella Chen)	游紹	
At Thirty (而立)	January 2020	William Wei	Arthur Chou	
Cat Republic (貓咪共和國)	March 2020	William Wei	Shaun Su	
Best Meal in the World (一口一口)	April 2020	William Wei	Shaun Su	
Don't Tell (不用告訴我)	April 2020	William Wei	Remii Huang	
How About This (這樣好嗎)	May 2020	William Wei	Remii Huang	
I'll Be Here (記得回來)	July 2020	William Wei	Shaun Su	
Toothbrush (房客)	July 2020	William Wei	Chang Ching Yu	
I Wrote A Song For You	August 2020	William Wei	-	
Sounds Of My Life	September 2020	William Wei	Chang Ching Yu	
See You On Monday	October 2020	William Wei	Chang Ching Yu	
Listen To Me (聽我的)	November 2020	William Wei	Chang Ching Yu	
World Without You (沒有你的世界)	November 2020	William Wei	WALL	
Brand New	December 2020	William Wei	Chang Ching Yu	
Marry Me (請你嫁給我)	December 2020	William Wei	Chang Ching Yu	
Just Stay with Me (因為是你)	May 2021	William Wei	SuZan	
Fresh UP (清爽 UP)	June 2021	William Wei	胡瑞財	
Cheap Love	October 2021	William Wei (with Ben&Ben)	Birdy Nio	
Red Scarf (如果可以)	November 2021	William Wei	Giddens Ko	
R.I.P.	December 2021	William Wei	Birdy Nio	
Is It Not Enough	January 2022	William Wei	Birdy Nio	
I'm More Sober When I'm Drunk	January 2022	William Wei	Birdy Nio	
Typo	January 2022	William Wei	Birdy Nio	
Leave This Bed	January 2022	William Wei	Birdy Nio	
Get Outta My Head	January 2022	William Wei	Birdy Nio	
Don't Show It	January 2022	William Wei	Birdy Nio	
U	January 2022	William Wei	Birdy Nio	
Cheap Love	January 2022	William Wei	Birdy Nio	
Red Scarf [Korean Version] (만약)	March 2022	William Wei	Giddens Ko	
Red Scarf [Japanese Version] (赤い糸)	April 2022	William Wei	Giddens Ko	

=== As featuring artist ===
#	Title	Year	Artist(s)	Director(s)	Ref
1st	Fix You	October 2012	William Wei, Ho Jing-Yang and others	張皓然	
2nd	My Sun (自己的太陽)	September 2014	William Wei, Claire Kuo, Rainie Yang, Shin, Shang Wenjie, Yisa Yu, Vision Wei, Chen Chusheng and Hua Chenyu	潘昶勳	
3rd	How Have You Been (別來無恙)	February 2016	FanFan (feat. William Wei)	吳仲倫	
4th	Queen Medley	October 2018	William Wei, Alycia Marie, Ani Lorak, Ayumu Yamashita, Bradlee, Bully, Mateus Carrilho, Connie Isla, Curricé, Daniel J. Layton, Denise Rosenthal, Ekin Beril, Joshua Simon, Jugs Jugueta, Laura Tobón, Stan Walker and Thomas		
5th	Never Again (再也不要)	December 2020	Nine Chen (feat. William Wei)	Ayeh (葉丁瑋)	
6th	2021 Hand in Hand (2021手牽手)	June 2021	William Wei, Hebe Tien, Wu Qing-feng, Li Quan, JJ Lin, Shi Shi, Soft Lipa, One-Fang, E.SO, Tan Weiwei and Tarcy Su		

=== Guest appearance ===
#	Title	Year	Artist(s)	Director(s)	Ref
1st	Love Begger (愛情乞丐)	August 2007	卓義峯	陳勇秀	

== Songwriting credits ==
Wei has written songs for many singers including Jolin Tsai, FanFan, Aska Yang and Angela Zhang. Before Wei debuted as a singer, he has been writing songs for other artists. His first published work was 'Little Eyes' (小眼睛) by FanFan in 2007.

#	Title	Year	Artist(s)	Lyrics	Music	Album	Ref
1st	Little Eyes (小眼睛)	4 September 2007	FanFan	William Wei	William Wei	Philosopher (哲學家)	
2nd	Again (重來)	14 December 2007	Angela Zhang	William Wei	William Wei	ANG 5.0	
3rd	Still The Same (還是一樣)	1 January 2008	Rene Liu	William Wei	William Wei	I'm Fine (我很好)	
4th	Know (知道)	9 May 2008	Claire Kuo	William Wei	William Wei	The Next Dawn (下一個天亮)	
5th	Find Fault (牛角尖)	22 May 2009	Claire Kuo	William Wei	William Wei	Singing in the Trees (在樹上唱歌)	
6th	Trilogy (三部曲)	22 May 2009	Claire Kuo	William Wei	William Wei	Singing in the Trees (在樹上唱歌)	
7th	Stop Giving Birth (別再生了)	11 July 2009	FanFan	William Wei	William Wei	F ONE	
8th	Warm Hands (暖暖手)	18 December 2010	Yao Yao, Jing Boran	余琛懋	William Wei	Warm Hands (暖暖手)	
9th	Discover Love Again (又發現了愛)	6 May 2011	Rafi Tsai, Kevin Wu, Jasper Lee, Stephen Rong, Tee Yau	William Wei	William Wei	SUPER! I DO!	
10th	Baby Girl	3 August 2011	Roch Tsai	William Wei	William Wei	Achieve (實現)	
11th	Many Dreams (夢想很多)	3 August 2011	Roch Tsai	William Wei	William Wei	Achieve (實現)	
12th	Soft and Cuddly (軟綿綿)	25 August 2011	Claire Kuo	William Wei	William Wei	Another She (陪著我的時候想著她)	
13th	Another Sunny Day (又是艷陽天)	30 August 2011	Claire Kuo, William Wei	William Wei	William Wei	Another She (陪著我的時候想著她)	
14th	Bad Person (壞人)	24 February 2012	Park Jung-min	William Wei	William Wei	Soundtrack for television series 'Fondant Garden' (翻糖花園)	
15th	Driftwood (漂流木)	12 September 2012	Aggie Hsieh	William Wei	William Wei	Driftwood (漂流木)	
16th	The Wright Brothers (萊特兄弟)	21 September 2012	Jing Chang	William Wei	William Wei	Little Girl (小女孩)	
17th	Forget Me (忘了我)	22 March 2013	Aska Yang	林建良, 黃婷	William Wei	First Love (初.愛)	
18th	Nobody With Me (沒有人陪我)	31 May 2013	Issac Deng	William Wei	William Wei	Don't Cry (不流淚)	
19th	Is It Love Or Companion? (是愛還是陪伴)	20 June 2014	Shi Shi	林建良	William Wei	GIRLS	
20th	Not Over You (不還)	27 June 2014	Claire Kuo	William Wei	William Wei	Until We Meet (豔遇)	
21st	Flaming Beacon (烽火)	2 August 2014	Europa Huang, William Wei, Lala Hsu	陳樂融	Europa Huang, William Wei	Tribute song for the victims of 2014 Kaohsiung gas explosions	
22nd	My Sun (自己的太陽)	9 September 2014	William Wei, Claire Kuo, Rainie Yang, Shin, Shang Wenjie, Yisa Yu, Vision Wei, Chen Chusheng, Hua Chenyu	William Wei	William Wei	Theme song for 12th MusicRadio "Going to School" (我要上學) Charity Event	
23rd	I Love, I Embrace (自愛自受)	15 November 2014	Jolin Tsai	Shih Jen-cheng	William Wei	Play (呸)	
24th	Blue Christmas (藍色聖誕節)	30 December 2014	Vivian Hsu	William Wei, Vivian Hsu	William Wei	To Women (敬女人)	
25th	How Have You Been (別來無恙)	9 January 2016	FanFan, William Wei	William Wei	William Wei	Fanfan's Time to Give Thanks (范范的感恩節)	
26th	See Through (看透)	31 December 2016	Jia Jia	William Wei	William Wei	Still Missing (還是想念)	
27th	Ok Or Not Ok? (好, 不好?)	20 September 2017	A-Lin	Francis Lee	William Wei	A-Lin (A-Lin同名專輯)	
28th	I Want You To Love Me	8 December 2017	Kimberley Chen	William Wei	William Wei	Tag Me	
29th	Think (想)	18 December 2017	Victor Wong	William Wei	William Wei	Implication (言外之意)	
30th	I Love You	22 May 2018	Puff Kuo	黃婷, Puff Kuo	William Wei	I Love You	
31st	Tomorrow's Star (明日之星)	23 October 2018	Lara Veronin	Lara Veronin	Lara Veronin, William Wei	Thousand-Face Beast (千面獸)	
32nd	Ping Pong (乒乓)	10 December 2018	Pakho Chau	Riley Lam	William Wei	All about Love (關於愛)	
33rd	That Spring (那年春天)	5 February 2019	Cai Xukun	Daryl Yao, Cai Xukun	Cai Xukun, William Wei	Song for Beijing TV's Spring Festival Gala	
34th	Call Me By Your Name (以你的名字呼喊我)	16 May 2019	Fish Leong	Xiaohan	William Wei	How Am I? – The Sun Rises As Usual (我好嗎？──太陽如常升起)	
35th	No Regret (不後悔)	31 May 2019	Bii	William Wei	William Wei	Be Better	
36th	One Time Sorrow (一次難過)	7 September 2019	Jia Jia	William Wei	William Wei	I, ME, MINE (我想要的)	
37th	Game Bro (遊戲Bro)	4 October 2019	Nine Chen	Nine Chen, William Wei, Wang Shun		PASS (過)	
38th	I Ain't A Poet) (以詩之名)	18 October 2019	Jozie Lu	Jozie Lu	William Wei	One Two FREE Fall (落落大方)	
39th	Between Love and You(在愛和你之間)	15 November 2019	Faith Yang	William Wei	William Wei	The More Beautiful, The More Invisible (越美麗越看不見)	
40th	With You	21 November 2019	Zhang Xianzi	William Wei	William Wei	Best Actress (最佳女主角)	
41st	Never Again (再也不要)	11 December 2019	Nine Chen	William Wei, Holly Lou, 晴時書, 姚書寰, 蔡周翰		PASS (過)	
42nd	My Friend (我的朋友)	19 December 2019	Zhang Xianzi	William Wei	William Wei	Big Till The End (大條到底)	
43rd	I Don't Understand (是我不懂)	21 March 2020	Michael Wong	William Wei	William Wei	Unique (絕類)	
44th	Still Believe (我還相信我)	23 March 2020	Wayne Huang	Wayne Huang	Wayne Huang, William Wei	Photophobia (背光旅行)	
45th	Come Back To Me	24 March 2020	ViVi	William Wei, JerryC		Lonely Planet (小小星球)	
46th	On The Way	19 January 2021	Hoo Leeger	William Wei, Jovany Barreto, 呂孝廷, Hoo Leeger, NYK, 高孟昊		On The Way	
47th	Affection (深愛)	20 March 2021	Penny Yu	陳憶中	William Wei, Jin Wen Tseng	Affection (深愛)	
48th	Anything You Want	28 May 2021	Tifa Chen	夏鳶, William Wei, 高維綸 M.Kao, KIRE, Tifa Chen	William Wei, 高維綸 M.Kao, KIRE	Anything You Want	
49th	Penguins in the Arctic (北極的企鵝)	25 August 2021	Xu Zi Wei	陳憶中	William Wei	Penguins in the Arctic (北極的企鵝)	
50th	Shameless (袂見笑)	26 November 2021	Emerson Tsai	Emerson Tsai, 黃婕熙, 林建良	William Wei	Free Time (有閒)	
51st	Figure You Out (揣摩)	17 December 2021	Greg Hsu	林建良	William Wei	Greg Han (許光漢)	
