= List of William Wei concerts =

Taiwanese singer-songwriter William Wei has held four concert tours. His debut concert, The Fleeing of a Two-Legged Bookcase, was held at Taipei and Taichung in 2010. The concert was held in support of his first eponymous album.

In 2012, Wei held his second concert, Through My Lenses, in Hong Kong and later Taiwan. In 2015, Wei held his third concert, Free That Girl, at the Taipei Arena of Taiwan. The concert's opening act was a 15-minute Broadway style sing-and-dance item that infused elements of swing jazz and disco dance. Free That Girl was held in Hong Kong on 18 June 2016.

In 2019, Wei announced his fourth concert tour 'At Thirty' which was held in 8 major cities in China. Wei will continue to tour in Singapore and Malaysia in 2020.

== Major concerts ==
=== The Fleeing of a Two-Legged Bookcase (2010) ===
The Fleeing of a Two-Legged Bookcase (兩腳出書的逃亡) was Wei's first major concert. It was held in support of his first eponymous album. Wei performed songs from his debut album as well as three previously unreleased songs: 'Why Life', 'She'll be an Angel' and 'Me, a Pig, and His Girlfriend'. An accompanying live album of the same name was released on 3 June 2011.

Date	City	Country	Venue	Special Guest(s)	Ref
18 September 2010	Taipei	Taiwan	Taipei International Convention Center		
25 September 2010	Taichung	Taiwan	National Chung Hsing University Hui Sun Auditorium		

=== Through My Lenses (2012) ===
Through My Lenses (印象派) was Wei's second major concert. It was held in support of his second album. The concert was first held in Hong Kong and it was Wei's first major concert abroad. The concert was later held in Taiwan.

Date	City	Country	Venue	Special Guest(s)	Ref
10 November 2012	Hong Kong	China	Kowloonbay International Trade & Exhibition Centre Star Hall	Ellen Loo (盧凱彤)	
25 November 2012	Taipei	Taiwan	National Taiwan University Sports Center	Waa Wei (魏如萱)	

=== Free That Girl (2015-17) ===
Free That Girl was Wei's third major concert. It was his first concert held in Taipei Arena. Wei opened the concert with a 15-minute Broadway style sing-and-dance item along with twelve dancers. The concert also featured a three dimensional guitar-shaped stage that was 3 stories tall and cost NT$2 million to build.

Date	City	Country	Venue	Special Guest(s)	Ref
12 September 2015	Taipei	Taiwan	Taipei Arena	Jeannie Hsieh (謝金燕), Fang Wu (吳汶芳)	
18 June 2016	Hong Kong	China	Kowloonbay International Trade & Exhibition Centre Star Hall	Vivian Chow (周慧敏)	
13 May 2017	Guangzhou	China	Sun Yat-sen Memorial Hall	-	
10 June 2017	Chengdu	China	Jincheng Palace of Fine Arts	-	
1 July 2017	Beijing	China	Master Card Centre M Hall	Lala Hsu (徐佳瑩)	
28 October 2017	Singapore	Singapore	Resorts World Theatre Resorts World Sentosa	-	

=== At Thirty (2019 - 2020) ===
At Thirty was Wei's fourth major concert. The tour is named after his newest single and is a celebration of his 10 years in music, as well as a beginning for a new phase in his artistry. Each tour leg has its own unique setlist composed of his classic songs as well as newer singles.

Date	City	Country	Venue	Special Guest(s)	Ref
2 November 2019	Beijing	China	M Space	-	
9 November 2019	Nanjing	China	Nanjing Olympic Sports Centre Sub Hall	-	
23 November 2019	Chengdu	China	Huaxi Live 528 M Space	-	
30 November 2019	Wuhan	China	武漢客廳·中國文化博覽中心 Hall D	-	
7 December 2019	Shenzhen	China	Shenzhen Chiwan Petroleum Base Warehouse H	-	
14 December 2019	Fuzhou	China	Fuzhou Gymnasium	-	
21 December 2019	Chongqing	China	華熙文化體育館	-	
1 January 2020	Hangzhou	China	MAO Livehouse	-	
6 March 2021	Singapore	Singapore	Sands Expo & Convention Centre Hall F	-	
20 March 2021	Kuala Lumpur	Malaysia	Mega Star Arena Viva Mall	-	

=== After Thirty (2020) ===
After Thirty (而立之後) was Wei's fifth major concert and the two shows were held at Taipei Music Center. Having previously toured 8 big cities and released a self-composed album, After Thirty is said to be a ‘brand-new start’ for William Wei as he explores the deep sentiments he holds for his past.⁣

Date	City	Country	Venue	Special Guest(s)	Ref
19 December 2020	Taipei	Taiwan	Taipei Music Center	Waa Wei	
20 December 2020	Taipei	Taiwan	Taipei Music Center	EggPlantEgg	

== Virtual concerts ==
Date	Title	Streaming Platform(s)
30 October 2020	HyperLIVE 2020: Listen To Me	KKBOX, Hami Video, MOD Channel

== Other concerts ==
Date	Title	City	Country	Venue	Special Guest(s)
15 August 2010	The Fleeing of a Two-Legged Bookcase Pre-Concert	Taipei	Taiwan	Riverside Xi Men	
11 June 2011	Golden Music Festival	Taipei	Taiwan	Huashan 1914 Creative Park	
15 January 2012	Weibird Homecoming Thank You Concert	Taipei	Taiwan	Taipei Digital Plaza	
14 July 2012	Someone Is Waiting Evening Concert	Taipei	Taiwan	Huashan 1914 Creative Park	
20 July 2012	Power of Color Concert	Taipei	Taiwan	Fubon International Conference Center	
21 July 2012	Someone Is Waiting Evening Concert	Kaohsiung	Taiwan	Kaohsiung Museum of Fine Arts Outdoor Circle Atrium	
28 July 2012	Someone Is Waiting Evening Concert	Taichung	Taiwan	Park Lane by CMP	
30 January 2013	Taiwan Music Night in Paris	Paris	France	Le Trianon	
15 November 2013	Double Payback Concert	Taipei	Taiwan	Legacy Taipei	
17 December 2013	The Pursuit of Happiness Concert	Taipei	Taiwan	Riverside Xi Men	
24 March 2014	Journey Into The Night Album Preview Concert	Taipei	Taiwan	Legacy Taipei	
26 April 2014	By Your Side Concert Tour	Kaohsiung	Taiwan	The Wall	MATZKA
3 May 2014	By Your Side Concert Tour	Taichung	Taiwan	TADA－The Arts Dreaming Ark	MATZKA
10 May 2014	By Your Side Concert Tour	Taipei	Taiwan	Legacy Taipei	Softlipa
11 May 2014	By Your Side Concert Tour	Taipei	Taiwan	Legacy Taipei	Softlipa
26 June 2014	Golden Melody @ Live House - GMA25	Taipei	Taiwan	Riverside Xi Men	
20 July 2014	By Your Side Concert Tour	Kuala Lumpur	Malaysia	Mega Star Arena	
20 September 2014	By Your Side Concert Tour	Beijing	China	Tango Live House	
29 July 2017	Super Slippa 7	Taipei	Taiwan	Taipei Nangang Exhibition Centre	
18 September 2016	It All Started From An Intro Live Show	Taichung	Taiwan	Legacy Taichung	
25 September 2016	It All Started From An Intro Live Show	Kuala Lumpur	Malaysia	Bentley Music Auditorium	
8 October 2016	It All Started From An Intro Live Show	Hong Kong	China	1563 Live House	
9 October 2016	It All Started From An Intro Live Show	Taipei	Taiwan	Clapper Studio	
26 November 2016	It All Started From An Intro Live Show	Singapore	Singapore	Shanghai Dolly	MICappella
21 June 2017	2017 Golden Melody Festival Showcase	Taipei	Taiwan	ATT Showbox	
13 October 2017	Listen & See: The Rhythm of Neighbourhoods	Xiamen	China	Hotel Indigo Xiamen Harbour	
8 December 2017	Migu Music Live	Chongqing	China	Chongqing Grand Theatre	
20 July 2018	Migu Music Live	Wuhan	China	Wuhan Hubei Theatre	
4 August 2018	Super Slippa 9	Taipei	Taiwan	Taipei Arena	
21 June 2019	Voice Up Concert	Taipei	Taiwan	Legacy Taipei	
22 June 2019	Voice Up Concert	Taipei	Taiwan	Legacy Taipei	
23 August 2020	Super Slippa 11	Taipei	Taiwan	Taipei Arena	
