= It All Started from an Intro =

Studio album by William Wei
- Released: August 16, 2016
- Genre: Mandopop
- Length: 69:10
- Language: Mandarin
- Label: Linfair Records
- Producer: 蔡尚文; William Wei

William Wei chronology
Journey into The Night (2014)	It All Started from an Intro (2016)	Sounds of My Life (2020)

It All Started from an Intro (Chinese: 硬戳; pinyin: Yìng chuō)) is the fourth studio album by Taiwanese Mandopop singer-songwriter William Wei. It was released digitally on August 16, 2016 and physically on August 18, 2016 by Linfair Records. The album consists of 11 tracks and 5 bonus tracks.

Wei merges technology and music in his fourth album. The album features a QR code as its cover, designed by Red Dot Design Award winner David Lai (賴佳韋) and Golden Pin Design Award winner Wei Chia Lu (呂瑋嘉). By scanning the QR code cover with the VisionLens app, a "virtual William Wei" 3D model will appear and interact with its listeners.

== Track listing ==
All music is composed by William Wei.

Disc 1
No.	Title	Lyrics	Length
1.	"Intro"	William Wei	04:09
2.	"Desire (渴望)"	William Wei	04:28
3.	"Guessing Game (猜)"	William Wei	04:19
4.	"Luvin' U"	William Wei	04:14
5.	"Play Game (玩遊戲)"	William Wei	04:16
6.	"Think of You First (第一個想到你)"	William Wei	05:27
7.	"For Your Own Good (為你好)"	William Wei	03:54
8.	"One Shoe (一隻鞋)"	William Wei	04:33
9.	"If We Meet Again (如果再見)"	Tim Lim（林建良）	03:42
10.	"Goon (癡人)"	William Wei	05:10
11.	"What You Think of Me (在意)"	William Wei	04:12
Total length:			48:24

Disc 2 (Bonus)
No.	Title	Lyrics	Music	Length
1.	"Girl (女孩)"	William Wei	William Wei	05:06
2.	"Single (一個人)"	William Wei	William Wei	03:49
3.	"May Have Been (似曾)"	Edward Lam	Chen Chien-Chi	04:05
4.	"Mirror of Sanctity (崑崙鏡)"	William Wei	William Wei	03:52
5.	"Don't Say (別說沒愛過)"	William Wei	William Wei	03:54
Total length:				20:46

== Music videos ==
#	Title	Year	Director(s)	Ref
1st	Luvin' U	May 2016	陳映之	
2nd	Intro	July 2016	Hi-Organic	
3rd	Think of You First (第一個想到你)	August 2016	Richie Jen (任賢齊)	
4th	If We Meet Again (如果再見)	September 2016	黃中平	
5th	What You Think of Me (在意)	November 2016	Hi-Organic	
