= F One =

F One may refer to:

- F One (album), a 2009 album by FanFan
- Formula One, a motorsport

== See also ==
- F1 (disambiguation)
