= I Don't Want to Forget You =

I Don't Want to Forget You 我不想忘記妳

Studio album by Claire Kuo
- Released: 29 June 2007
- Genre: Mandopop
- Label: Linfair Records

Claire Kuo chronology
I Don't Want to Forget You 我不想忘記妳 (2007)	The Next Dawn 下一個天亮 (2008)

I Don't Want to Forget You (simplified Chinese: 我不想忘记妳; traditional Chinese: 我不想忘記妳) is the first studio album by Claire Kuo. It was released on 29 June 2007 by Linfair Records.

== Track listing ==
1. "I Don't Want to Forget You" / 我不想忘記你
2. "Three People" (With Angela Chang & Christine Fan) / 仨人
3. "Can't Stop Thinking" / 想個不停
4. "Leave" / 離開
5. "Playing Piano By Myself" / 一個人彈琴
6. "Sparrow" / 麻雀
7. "Your Sweet Smell" / 你的香氣
8. "Pull the Alarm" / 拉警報
9. "Time" / 時光
10. "In My Remaining Years" / 有生之年

== MV ==
1. I Don't Want to Forget You / 我不想忘記你 MV
2. Three People" (With Angela Chang & Christine Fan) / 仨人 MV
3. Can't Stop Thinking / 想個不停 MV
4. Sparrow 麻雀 / MV
5. Your Sweet Smell / 你的香氣 MV
