= Don't Say =

Don't Say may refer to:

- "Don't Say" (Jon B. song), 1997
- "Don't Say" (William Wei song), 2015
- "Don't Say" (The Chainsmokers song), 2017
- "Don't Say", a 2007 song by Laura Critchley
- "Don't Say", a 2026 song by Han from SKZ-Replay 2026 Pt.1
