= Loved (Claire Kuo album) =

Loved (Claire Kuo album) 我们曾相爱

Studio album by Claire Kuo
- Released: 22 December 2016
- Genre: Mandopop
- Label: Linfair Records

Claire Kuo chronology
| Until We Meet (2014) | Loved (Claire Kuo album) 我们曾相爱 (2016) |

Loved (simplified Chinese: 我们曾相爱; traditional Chinese: 我們曾相愛) is the eighth studio album by Claire Kuo. It was released on 22 December 2016 by Linfair Records.

== Track listing ==
1. "Loved" / 我们曾相爱
2. "Don't Make Me Cry" / 别惹哭我
3. "No Matter What" / 傻傻爱着你
4. "I Am Moving On" / 该忘的日子
5. "Take A Breath" / 深呼吸
6. "Breaking Up For Now" / 分手看看
7. "Leave Me Hanging" / 消耗寂寞
8. "After the Love Has Gone" / 分开不是谁不好
9. "Partners" / 拍档
10. "You Were Meant For Me" / 最美的等候
11. "How to Forget" / 忘了如何遗忘
12. "I Love Me" / 遇见新的我

== MV ==
1. I Am Moving On / 该忘的日子
2. Breaking Up For Now / 分手看看
3. After the Love Has Gone / 分开不是谁不好
4. Partners / 拍档
5. How to Forget / 忘了如何遗忘
6. I Love Me / 遇见新的我
