= Your Friend =

Your Friend may refer to:

- Your Friend (album), a 2010 studio album by Claire Kuo
- Your Friend (band) (Taryn Blake Miller, born 1991), musician from Kansas
- "Your Friend" (song), a track from the 2017 album Oblivion by T-Pain
