= Play Game =

Single by William Wei
- Released: 19 September 2015
- Genre: Pop; electropop
- Length: 3:59
- Label: Linfair Records
- Songwriter: William Wei

William Wei singles chronology
"Don't Say" (2015)	"Play Game" (2015)	"Mirror of Sanctity" (2015)

"Play Game" (Chinese: 玩遊戲; pinyin: Wán yóuxì) is a song recorded by Taiwanese Mandopop singer-songwriter William Wei. The song was recorded and released as a promotional single for Microsoft Office 365. The song was released as a single by Linfair Records on 19 September 2015.

An accompanying music video was released on 14 September 2015. It was directed by Kidding (許智彥). A subsequent extended version music video was released on 28 October 2015, featuring Wei with 156 selected fans.

== Background and composition ==
“Play Game" is an uptempo electropop song with an electro beat and elements of trance. It was written by Wei in collaboration with the Taiwanese Microsoft Office 365 team. In a radio interview, Wei explained that the song was inspired by his experiences playing online games. Wei shared that although he often played to relieve stress, he sometimes became more agitated and frustrated due to the competitiveness of the games. Wei compared life to a game – we often get so involved in the game that we forget that we are playing a game. Taking life too seriously will rob us of happiness and fun. Wei hopes that everyone can re-align our perspectives and enjoy the things we do in life.

== Music video ==
The music video for "Play Game" was directed by Kidding. It premiered on YouTube on 14 September 2016. The video begins with a dreaded Wei reporting to work. The video follows Wei as he endures his daily monotonous work routine. Later, Wei decides to lighten things up and have some fun at work.

Subsequently, Microsoft Office 365 launched an online portal for fans to submit short video clips that portrays having fun in the office. Selected fans will have their videos featured in a special music video with Wei. On 28 November 2015, a followed-up music video was released, featuring Wei and 56 selected fans.
