= Li Jing (TV presenter) =

Taiwanese entertainer and model

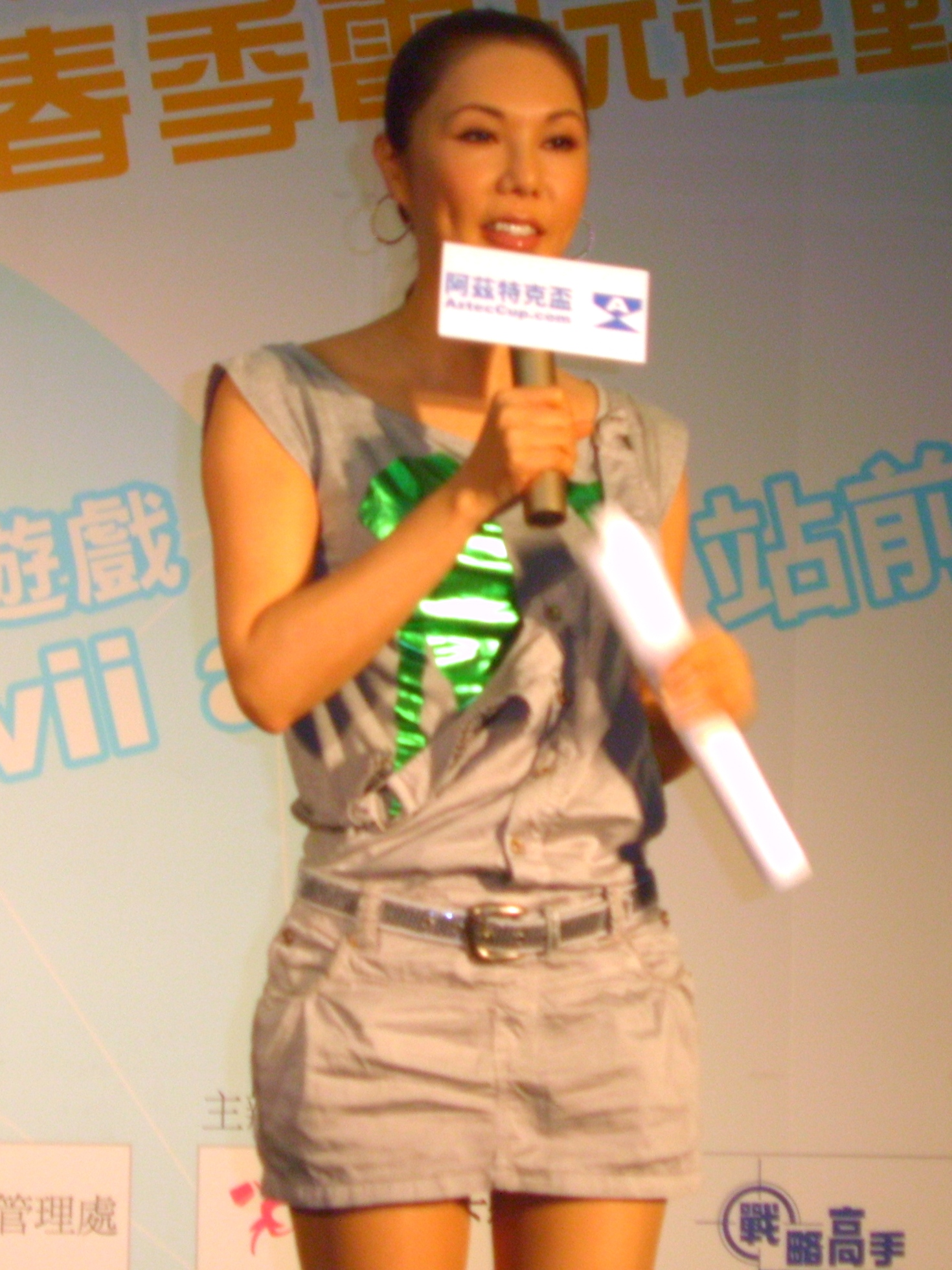
- Li Jing in 2007
- Born: 25 October 1962 (age 62); Taichung County (now part of Taichung City), Taiwan
- Occupation: Television presenter
- Years active: 2003 – present

Regine Wu (Chinese: 吳明恩; pinyin: Wú Míng'ēn; born 25 October 1962), known professionally as Li Jing (Chinese: 利菁; pinyin: Lì Jìng), is a Taiwanese television show hostess and model who is notable for being Taiwan's first mainstream transgender entertainer. Due to her time spent hosting shopping channel programs on Eastern Television's Shopping Channel (ETTV Shopping), she has been referred to as the "Queen of the Shopping Channel" in Taiwan.

She also served as general manager and chief producer of Beijing Oriental Huanteng Culture company.

== Career ==
Shows that Li Jing has hosted include:

- Hot Queen Palace (STAR Chinese Channel)
- Hongse Fengbao (CTi Variety; production ended)
- Tian Tian Da Jing Cai (TVBS-G; production ended)
- Super Idol (Taiwan Television, SET Metro)
- Diamond Club (Taiwan Television)
