= Slowly Wait =

EP by William Wei
- Released: March 13, 2009
- Genre: Mandopop
- Length: 7:32
- Language: Mandarin
- Label: Linfair Records

William Wei chronology
Slowly Wait (2009)	William Wei (2010)

Slowly Wait (Chinese: 慢慢等; pinyin: Màn man děng) is the first EP by William Wei. It was released on 13 March 2009, by Linfair Records. The EP consists of two tracks, 'Slowly Wait' (慢慢等) and 'Good Weather' (好天氣). Both songs were previously published onto StreetVoice, an online music platform, and stayed on top of the charts for weeks. The song, 'Slowly Wait', continued to chart inside the top three positions for two consecutive years.

== Track listing ==
All tracks are written by William Wei

No.	Title	Length
1.	"Slowly Wait (慢慢等)"	3:42
2.	"Good Weather (好天氣)"	3:49
Total length:		7:32
