= One to One (Christine Fan album) =

Studio album 一比一 by Christine Fan
- Released: 4 August 2005
- Genre: Mandopop
- Language: Mandarin
- Label: Linfair Records

Christine Fan chronology
First Dream 最初的夢想 (2004)	One to One (2005)	Our Anniversary 我們的紀念日 (2006)

One to One (Chinese: 一比一) is Taiwanese Mandopop artist Christine Fan's fifth Mandarin studio album. It was released on 4 August 2005 by Linfair Records.

The track "一比一" (One to One) was nominated for Top 10 Gold Songs at the Hong Kong TVB8 Awards, presented by television station TVB8, in 2005.

== Track listing ==
1. "就是你" (it's You)
2. "一比一" (One to One)
3. "不眠" (Sleepless)
4. "一直到最後" (To the End)
5. "多麼多麼愛你" (Love You Lots)
6. "如果的事" (Why) with Angela Chang
7. "沒那麼愛他" (Don't Love Him)
8. "Cold"
9. "鞭韆"
10. "親吻寂寞旅人" (Kiss the Lonely)
11. "全世界失眠" (World Insomnia)
