= Super Idol (Taiwanese TV series) =

- Traditional Chinese: 超級偶像
- Simplified Chinese: 超级偶像
- Hanyu Pinyin: Chāojí Ǒuxiàng
- Genre: Reality television
- Created by: Sanlih E-Television
- Presented by: Regine Li (2007–2011); Fang Fangfang (2012); Sam Tseng (2012–14); Claire Guo (2012–14); Sasa Zhong (2014)
- Country of origin: Taiwan
- Original language: Mandarin
- No. of seasons: 7
- No. of episodes: 254

Production
- Running time: Approx. 120 minutes
- Production company: You Song Broadcasting

Original release
- Network: TTV; SET Metro
- Release: 27 October 2007 – 7 December 2014

Super Idol (Chinese: 超級偶像) was a Taiwanese music competition aiming to showcase and find new singing talent. The winner of the competition would receive a recording contract. The show was produced by Sanlih E-Television and the series premiered on 27 October 2007 on SET Metro, and ended after nine seasons of broadcast on 7 December 2014.

== Hosts ==
Regine Li hosted the first six seasons, but due to her health, replacements hosted the show until 26 May 2012 when Fang Fangfang took over as the host in season seven. For season eight, Sam Tseng and Claire Guo were replaced with the hosts until the series' end, and Sasa Zhong replaced Guo during the middle of the ninth and final season.

== Format ==
=== Buzzer format ===
A format similar to the Got Talent franchise and used on earlier phases of the competition, each judge in a panel of five has a buzzer to light up during a performance. When the contestant received at least three buzzer hits (but not all five), their performance is suspended. If the contestant did not receive all five buzzer hits, the judges may allow a contestant an additional 30-second "encore performance", otherwise the contestant is eliminated immediately. The contestant advances if they received less than three buzzer hits at the end of the performance (and during "encore performance" if applicable), but the contestant is eliminated if the contestant still receive at least three buzzer hits after the "encore performance". In some seasons, each judge has one "save" to use, to save a contestant from elimination.

During seasons six and seven, the number of judges is reduced to three and now requires no more than two buzzer hits to advance; getting two buzzer hits suspends the performance, and a third buzzer eliminated the contestant immediately.

=== Score scheme ===
Commonly used in each round, performances are determined by scores given by the judges. Each judge is allowed to give each contestant up to 10 points, with a maximum score of 50. In season eight onwards, the judges' maximum score is 20, with a maximum total score of 100.

For the first season, the total score was shown in integer, but due to the possibility that multiple contestants received the same scores, the later phases of the season were adjusted to include one decimal point. Beginning from the second season, the judges are no longer individually giving the contestants a score, but all at once, making the scoring system relevant as well.

Usually, the contestants, and if any, who received the lowest scores are eliminated from the competition. For weeks with a double-leg, the contestant with the lowest combined scores from both weeks is eliminated.

=== Cumulative scoring round ===
For the first five seasons, once the competition is down to six are finalists, these contestants will have to undergo four rounds for the champion title. Scores from the rounds are cumulative and weighted in favor of each episode (10%–20%-30%-40%); after three rounds, the contestant with a lower combined score is eliminated, and after all the rounds have been performed, the contestant with a higher combined score is named the season's winner. The Cumulative scoring round is similar to the one round of the same name in another Chinese show One Million Star and Chinese Million Star, but with a different format (scores are not weighed until the second round of the finals).

=== Battle round ===
Battle rounds are also common in each round whereas contestants competed head-to-head for survival. Winners on each battle are decided by a vote, and the contestant receiving a simple majority of votes wins the battle and are safe from elimination. The rules for the battle rounds vary on each season format:

- For the first four seasons, the judges will vote for the contestant for the better performance; the contestant to receive a simple majority of three votes wins the battle.
- In some episodes with six judges, four votes is required for the win; if the judges were tied with three votes each, both contestants advances instead.
- For seasons five and seven, some of the battles were adjusted to three contestants. A contestant requires at least two votes to win; a battle may produce either one or two winners.

=== Category format ===
Exclusive in the seventh season as a theme between campus and community category, similar to Project SuperStar (where the categories are gender-based) and earlier versions of The Voice, eliminations applied with an equal number of contestants from each category. Categories are dissolved beginning with the Top 20 (10 from each categories), meaning that eliminations are now applied disregarding to the category's affiliation. A similar variant also applied on the eighth season, but categories are based on the recording labels and only the top contestants are allowed to be in the category.

=== Returning champions format ===
Exclusive in the final season, the season's format was changed to an arena-style. Six new contestants each week compete in one round of song and the contestant whose scores are among the top three (12 new and six advances in the premiere week) will advance to the second round of the show; if there are more than one contestant tied with the third-highest score, a sing-off happen after the round and judges vote on who to advance. In the second round, a contestant competed head-to-head and the contestant with a higher score in each duel will become a champion; in the event of tie, a sing-off will be held on the following episode with scores reset.

Incumbent champions will compete in subsequent episodes with no option at bail out; for every challenge won, the champion wins NT$10,000 per winning streak with an option to quit at every 10 challenges; if the champion wins 25 challenges, the champion will retire and their winnings was augmented to NT$300,000.

== Series overview ==
Season	Premiere date	Finale date	Episodes	Winner	Runner-up	Third place	Fourth place	Fifth place	Sixth/seventh place	Recording label
1	27 October 2007	21 June 2008	35	Jing Chang	Huang Wen-hsing	Lin Zhong-xin	Erica Chiang	Wang Ya-ting	Shelly Gao; Lee Hui-cheng	Gold Typhoon
2	28 June 2008	31 January 2009	32	Eison Ai-Chen	Meeia Foo	Zowie Lim	Chucky Seah	BabyFace	Kimmy Chen; Priscilla "Nikki" Chung	Skyhigh Entertainment
3	7 February 2009	31 October 2009	39	Miu Chu	Hope Yang	Duan Xu-meng	Chen Yi-chou	Mirza Atif Baig	Chan Yi-fan; Gillian Chang	—N/a
4	7 November 2009	17 July 2010	35	Tseng Yu-Jia	Sasha Li	Hu Zhenhuan	Guo Shaoxuan	Kim Seul Gi	Fang Wu; Christine Lo	Seed Music Co.
5	24 July 2010	23 April 2011	39	Eve Ai	Hong Pei-Yu	Tsu Mu	Kevin Wu	Jasper Lee	Hsieh Yi-Chun; Ricardo Weng	Sony Music
6	30 April 2011	3 December 2011	30	Eason Lee	Chen Jie	Lee Song-hua	Alex Chiam	Judy Lee	Claude; Wang Wei-yu	Eagle Records
7	10 December 2011	16 March 2013	62	Po-An-Hsieh	Chen Pei Chieh	Lisa Chang	Paul Zhang	Albert Lin	Vicky Tsu; Jian Yan-Chiu	SP Entertainment Asia
8	21 July 2013	30 March 2014	34	Sawmah Chen	Chiang Fu-rou	Su Yu-zheng	Chen Jia-qi	Chang Huai-hao	Jung Der-Wang; Bernice Feng	Enjoy Records; Sony Music Entertainment Taiwan
9	6 April 2014	7 December 2014	35	Sammy Chang	—N/a					
