= To the Age of Innocence =

To The Age of Innocence 致純靜

Greatest hits album by Claire Kuo
- Released: 30 August 2013
- Genre: Mandopop
- Language: Mandarin
- Label: Linfair Records

Claire Kuo chronology
Keep Loving 我們都能幸福著 (2012)	To The Age of Innocence 致純靜 (2013)	Until We Meet 豔遇 (2014)

To The Age of Innocence (simplified Chinese: 致纯静; traditional Chinese: 致純靜) is the first greatest hits album by Claire Kuo. It was released on 30 August 2013 by Linfair Records.

== Track listing ==
Disc one: To Pure Love
No.	Title	Pinyin title	Length
1.	"Pride and Prejudice" (傲慢與偏見)	Ao Man Yu Pian Jian	3:50
2.	"Little Voice" (小聲音)	Xiao Sheng Yin	4:37
3.	"Know" (知道)	Zhi Dao	3:57
4.	"The Next Dawn" (下一個天亮)	Xia Yi Ge Tian Liang	4:26
5.	"Chat" (聊天)	Liao Tian	4:02
6.	"Without Medication" (不藥而癒)	Bu Yao Er Yu	4:30
7.	"Simple" (簡單)	Jian Dan	3:58
8.	"Every Day Is Different" (每一天都不同)	Mei Yi Tian Dou Bu Tong	3:59
9.	"Airliner to the Future" (往未來飛的客機)	Wang Wei Lai Fei De Ke Ji	4:28
10.	"Dowry" (嫁妝)	Jia Zhuang	3:46
11.	"Hundred Percent" (百分百)	Bai Fen Bai	4:15
12.	"Singing in The Trees" (在樹上唱歌)	Zai Shu Shang Chang Ge	3:59
13.	"Soft" (軟綿綿)	Ruan Mian Mian	3:40
14.	"A Big Joke" (大玩笑)	Da Wan Xiao	3:27
15.	"Encore LaLa"		2:59
16.	"To The Age of Innocence" (致純靜 (純愛金曲))	Zhi Chun Jing	04:20

Disc two: To Stories
No.	Title	Pinyin title	Length
1.	"I Am in Your Eyes" (你眼中的我)	Ni Yan Zhong De Wo	4:10
2.	"When Would You Come Again" (何日君再來)	He Ri Jun Zai Lai	3:17
3.	"I Don't Want To Forget You" (我不想忘記你)	Wo Bu Xiang Wang Ji Ni	4:05
4.	"Heart Wall" (心牆)	Xin Qiang	3:47
5.	"Another She" (陪著我的時候想著她)	Pei Zhe Wo De Shi Hou Xiang Zhe Ta	4:27
6.	"Shining Single Life" (單身美好)	Dan Shen Mei Hao	4:09
7.	"Sparrow" (麻雀)	Ma Que	4:31
8.	"Understand" (明白)	Ming Bai	4:43
9.	"Leave" (離開)	Li Kai	4:00
10.	"We Have Loved" (總算我們也愛過)	Zong Suan Wo Men Ye Ai Guo	3:41
11.	"Keep Loving" (我們都能幸福著)	Wo Men Dou Neng Xing Fu Zhe	4:08
12.	"Your Fragrance" (你的香氣)	Ni De Xiang Qi	4:30
13.	"Leave"		4:14
14.	"Just To See You Smile" (擁抱你的微笑)	Yong Bao Ni De Wei Xiao	3:59
15.	"A Gentle" (有溫柔)	You Wen Rou	4:23
