= Keep Loving =

Keep Loving 我們都能幸福著

Studio album by Claire Kuo
- Released: 7 December 2012
- Genre: Mandopop
- Language: Mandarin
- Label: Linfair Records

Claire Kuo chronology
Another She (2011)	Keep Loving 我們都能幸福著 (2012)	To The Age of Innocence (2013)

Keep Loving (simplified Chinese: 我们都能幸福着; traditional Chinese: 我們都能幸福著) is the 6th studio album by Claire Kuo. It was released on 7 December 2012 by Linfair Records.

== Track listing ==
No.	Title	Pinyin title	Length
1.	"A Heart Like Mine" (像我這樣)	Xiang Wo Zhe Yang	4:01
2.	"Memories of Us" (回憶的閣樓)	Hui Yi De Ge Lou	4:53
3.	"Don't Let Him Know" (別去問他好嗎)	Bie Qu Wen Ta Hao Ma	4:22
4.	"Thank You For Breaking My Heart" (謝謝你告訴我)	Xie Xie Ni Gao Su Wo	4:03
5.	"Love to Say Du Du" (Du Du好)	Du Du Hao	3:48
6.	"Shining Single Life" (單身美好)	Dan Shen Mei Hao	4:09
7.	"The Way I Am" (隨意)	Sui Yi	3:14
8.	"Walk Away" (放下)	Fang Xia	4:46
9.	"Keep Loving" (我們都能幸福著)	Wo Men Dou Neng Xing Fu Zhe	4:02
10.	"Just To See You Smile" (擁抱你的微笑)	Yong Bao Ni De Wei Xiao	3:59
