= I'm More Sober When I'm Drunk =

Studio album by William Wei
- Released: December 24, 2021
- Genre: Urban; R&B
- Length: 27:57
- Language: English
- Label: The Orchard
- Producer: William Wei; Aven Tsai; Sean Sinclair

William Wei chronology
Sounds of My Life (2020)	I'm More Sober When I'm Drunk (2021)

I'm More Sober When I'm Drunk is the sixth studio album by Taiwanese Mandopop singer-songwriter William Wei. It is his first full-length English album, compromising a total of 9 tracks. It was released on December 24, 2021, by The Orchard. It is primarily an urban record, with ingrained influences of R&B, chill trap, EDM and folk-pop. Its production was handled by Wei, along with Aven Tsai and Sean Sinclair.

The album deviates from Wei's usual style, offering listeners more of a laid-back, psychedelic sound, rather than the folk-pop ballads familiar to his fans. The theme of the album revolves around alcohol, partying, sex and heartbreak.

I'm More Sober When I'm Drunk received generally favourable reviews from music critics, most of whom praised Wei's songwriting and artistic maturity even though it is his first English album. Upon release, the lead single 'R.I.P.' topped the Western Single Chart on KKBOX. The album is also named one of the Top 10 best albums in 2021 by Hit FM, making it historically the first English album to receive this award.

== Track listing ==
All tracks are written by William Wei

No.	Title	Length
1.	"Is It Not Enough"	2:50
2.	"I'm More Sober When I'm Drunk"	3:00
3.	"Typo"	3:10
4.	"Leave This Bed"	2:50
5.	"Get Outta My Head"	3:45
6.	"R.I.P."	3:04
7.	"Don't Show It"	3:20
8.	"U"	2:59
9.	"Cheap Love"	2:56
Total length:		27:57
