= Your Friend (album) =

Your Friend 你朋友

Studio album by Claire Kuo
- Released: 14 May 2010
- Genre: Mandopop
- Label: Linfair Records

Claire Kuo chronology
Singing in the Trees 在树上唱歌 (2009)	Your Friend 你朋友 (2010)	Another She 陪着我的时候想着她 (2011)

Your Friend (simplified Chinese: 你 朋友; traditional Chinese: 妳 朋友) is the fourth studio album by Claire Kuo. It was released on 14 May 2010 by Linfair Records.

Following the release of this album, Claire Kuo was nominated in November 2010 at the 8th South East Best Billboard Awards for the Most Popular Female Singer Award in Hong Kong and Taiwan, of which she was a finalist.

== Composition ==
The opener and first single, "Encore LaLa", is a retro-styled song dominated by brass instrumentation and drum arrangements. A writer for Sohu wrote that Kuo's singing in the song was "sweet, sexy and energetic", while describing the song as "both retro and modern". "Dowry" is themed around sisterhood, with lyrics declaring that "good sisters have to get the nod of approval from other sisters when they are in love or getting married". Taiwanese-American singer-songwriter FanFan wrote "Chat", which Aidiren of Sohu Music called "a good karaoke song".

== Track listing ==
1. "Encore LaLa"
2. "Dowry" / 嫁妆
3. "Chat" / 聊天
4. "Everyday is Different" / 每一天都不同 (Měi yītiān dū bùtóng)
5. "Finally We Love" / 总算我们也爱过
6. "There is Tenderness" / 有温柔
7. "Last Dance" / 最后一支舞
8. "From Today" / 今天起
9. "Leave Your Love" / 离开你的爱
10. "Throbbing" / 悸动

== Music videos ==
1. Encore LaLa MV
2. Dowry / 嫁妆 MV
3. Chat / 聊天 MV
4. Everyday is Different / 每一天都不同 MV
5. Finally We Love / 总算我们也爱过 MV
