= The Fleeing of a Two-Legged Bookcase =

The Fleeing of a Two-Legged Bookcase Live Album

Live album by William Wei
- Released: June 3, 2011
- Genre: Mandopop
- Length: 1:00:19 (Disc 1); 39:44 (Disc 2)
- Language: Mandarin, English
- Label: Linfair Records
- Producer: 蔡尚文

William Wei chronology
William Wei (2010)	The Fleeing of a Two-Legged Bookcase Live Album (2011)	The Bird Who Saved the World (2012)

The Fleeing of a Two-Legged Bookcase Live Album (Chinese: 兩腳書櫥的逃亡 演唱會Live; pinyin: Liǎng jiǎo shū chú de táo wáng yǎn chàng huì Live) is the first concert live album by William Wei. Wei held his first major concert on September 18, 2010 at the Taipei International Convention Center, which was recorded for this live release. The 2-CD album contains 23 tracks from the live set, including songs from Wei's debut album as well as three previously unreleased songs: 'Why Life' (外·賴), 'She'll be an Angel', 'Me, a Pig, and His Girlfriend' (我 一只豬 和他的女朋友). Besides, he also covered some of his all-time pop favorites, including famous numbers of A-mei, Khalil Fong, James Blunt, and Maroon 5. The album was released on 3 June 2011, by Linfair Records.

== Track listing ==
Disc 1
No.	Title	Length
1.	"Because of Love (因為愛)"	4:09
2.	"A Beautiful Mess" (from Jason Mraz)	5:37
3.	"Weibird's Talking"
4.	"Translation Exercise (翻譯練習)"	4:03
5.	"Story (故事)"	3:36
6.	"Hostage (人質)" (from A-mei)	2:45
7.	"This Love (愛愛愛)" (from Khalil Fong)	2:19
8.	"Weibird's Talking"
9.	"You're Beautiful" (from James Blunt)	3:32
10.	"This Love" (from Maroon 5)	3:13
11.	"Intro"
12.	"Why Life (外·賴)"	4:00
13.	"She'll Be An Angel"	3:36
14.	"Weibird's Talking"
15.	"Me, a Pig, and His Girlfriend (我 一只豬 和他的女朋友)"	3:22
16.	"The Fleeing of a Two-Legged Bookcase (兩腳書櫥的逃亡)"	3:48
17.	"A Little Bit More Perfect (完美一點)"	4:06
18.	"Weibird's Talking"
19.	"Little Eyes (小眼睛)" (from FanFan)	4:10
20.	"Weibird's Talking"
21.	"Cabbage + Again (高麗菜 + 重來)" (from Angela Chang)	3:37
Total length:		1:00:19

Disc 2
No.	Title	Length
1.	"The Blower's Daughter" (from Damien Rice)	4:32
2.	"Send You a Handful of Earth (送你一把泥土)" (from Fei Yu-ching)	2:20
3.	"Grace Kelly" (from Mika)	3:12
4.	"Weibird's Talking"
5.	"Have or Have Not (有沒有)"	4:15
6.	"Cloudy Sunflower (陰天的向日葵)"	4:53
7.	"Reasons (理由)"	7:37
8.	"Weibird's Talking"
9.	"Good Weather (好天氣)"	4:56
10.	"Slowly Wait (慢慢等)"	4:04
11.	"Weibird's Talking"
Total length:		39:44

== Music videos ==
#	Title	Director(s)	Year	Ref
1st	Why Life (外·賴)	邱柏翰	May 2011	
2nd	Hostage (人質)		May 2011	
