= The Bird Who Saved the World =

The Bird Who Saved The World

EP by William Wei
- Released: January 12, 2012
- Genre: Mandopop
- Length: 10:36
- Language: Mandarin
- Label: Linfair Records

William Wei chronology
| The Fleeing of a Two-Legged Bookcase (2011) | The Bird Who Saved The World (2012) | Someone Is Waiting (2012) |

The Bird Who Saved The World (Chinese: 什麼鳥日子; pinyin: Shén me niǎo rì zi) is the soundtrack album to the film of the same name by William Wei. It is also the second EP by Wei. The EP was released on January 12, 2012, by Linfair Records. It has three tracks, 'The Day of Bird' (鳥日子) performed by Wei and two instrumentals tracks. 'The Day of Bird' is the theme song of the movie and was written by Wei about his fears of an uncertain future after completing his military service.

== Track listing ==
All tracks are written by William Wei

| No. | Title | Length |
|---|---|---|
| 1. | "The Day of Bird (鳥日子)" | 4:04 |
| 2. | "The Day of Bird (鳥日子)" (Instrumental Version) | 3:19 |
| 3. | "What is Montage (什麼蒙太奇)" (Instrumental Version) | 3:13 |
| Total length: | | 10:36 |

== Music videos ==
| # | Title | Director(s) | Year | Ref |
| 1st | The Day of Bird (鳥日子) | 邱柏翰, 鄒奕笙 | April 2012 | |
