= Someone Is Waiting =

Studio album by William Wei
- Released: August 3, 2012
- Genre: Mandopop
- Length: 44:44
- Language: Mandarin, English
- Label: Linfair Records
- Producer: 蔡尚文

William Wei chronology
The Bird Who Saved the World (2012)	Someone Is Waiting (2012)	Journey into The Night (2014)

Someone Is Waiting (Chinese: 有人在等; pinyin: Yǒu rén zài děng) is the second studio album by Taiwanese Mandopop singer-songwriter William Wei. It was released on August 3, 2012, by Linfair Records. The album consists of 11 tracks.

== Track listing ==
All tracks are written by William Wei

No.	Title	Length
1.	"The Moon (月球)"	4:11
2.	"Bombing (轟炸)"	3:12
3.	"Tired (累)"	4:33
4.	"Heartbreak (心碎心醉)"	4:49
5.	"Still Loving You (還是愛著你)"	3:47
6.	"This Is Not Love (這不是愛情)"	3:37
7.	"Impressionist (印象派)"	4:32
8.	"One More Try"	3:30
9.	"Someone Is Waiting For Me (有人在等我)"	4:26
10.	"We'll Never Know"	4:08
11.	"Still (還是會)"	3:55
Total length:		44:44

== Music videos ==
#	Title	Director(s)	Year	Ref
1st	Still (還是會)	November 2011	張清峰	
2nd	We'll Never Know	July 2012	程安德	
3rd	Still Loving You (還是愛著你)	August 2012	林孝謙, 呂安弦	
4th	Heartbreak (心碎心醉)	August 2012	鄭有傑	
5th	Tired (累)	August 2012	陳宏一	
6th	Someone Is Waiting For Me (有人在等我)	September 2012	張家維	
