= Single (William Wei song) =

Single by William Wei
- Released: 26 January 2016
- Genre: Pop
- Length: 3:49
- Label: Linfair Records
- Songwriter(s): William Wei

William Wei singles chronology
"Mirror of Sanctity" (2015)	"Single" (2016)	"Live For You" (2016)

Single (Chinese: 一個人; pinyin: Yīgè rén) is a song recorded by Taiwanese Mandopop singer-songwriter William Wei. The song was written by Wei for television series Shia Wa Se as the closing theme song. It was released as a single by Linfair Records on 26 January 2016. "Single" peaked at number 2 in Singapore,

== Background and composition ==
"Single" is a pop ballad that is written by Wei. In a radio interview, Wei shared that inspiration of the song came from his colleagues around him, many of whom have crossed the age of 30 and are still single. Lyrically, the song explains that some people choose to stay single because they are still looking for the special one in their lives.
