= The Next Dawn =

The Next Dawn 下一個天亮

Studio album by Claire Kuo
- Released: 9 May 2008
- Genre: Mandopop
- Label: Linfair Records

Claire Kuo chronology
I Don't Want to Forget You (2007)	The Next Dawn 下一個天亮 (2008)	Singing in the Trees (2009)

The Next Dawn 下一個天亮
- DVD Edition

Alternative cover
- Limited Edition

The Next Dawn (simplified Chinese: 下一个天亮; traditional Chinese: 下一個天亮) is the second studio album by Claire Kuo. It was released on 9 May 2008 by Linfair Records.

== Track listing ==
1. The Next Dawn / 下一個天亮
2. 100% / 百分百
3. A Big Joke / 大玩笑
4. Love Message / 愛情訊息
5. Slowly Commemorates / 慢慢紀念
6. No Cure / 不藥而癒
7. Echo / 回音
8. Know / 知道 (Zhīdào)
9. Boundary Line / 界線
10. Sick / 感冒

== DVD ==
1. The Next Dawn / 下一個天亮 MV
2. 100% / 百分百 MV
3. No Cure / 不藥而癒 MV
4. A Big Joke / 大玩笑 MV
5. Know / 知道 MV
