= Singing in the Trees =

Singing in the Trees 在樹上唱歌

Studio album by Claire Kuo
- Released: 22 May 2009
- Genre: Mandopop
- Label: Linfair Records

Claire Kuo chronology
The Next Dawn (2008)	Singing in the Trees 在樹上唱歌 (2009)	Your Friend (2010)

Singing in the Trees (simplified Chinese: 在树上唱歌; traditional Chinese: 在樹上唱歌) is the third studio album by Claire Kuo. It was released on 22 May 2009 by Linfair Records.

== Track listing ==
1. Singing in the Trees / 在樹上唱歌
2. Understand / 明白
3. Heart Wall / 心牆
4. Find Fault / 牛角尖
5. Simple / 簡單 (Jiǎndān)
6. Goodbye
7. Mona Lisa / 蒙娜麗莎
8. Trilogy / 三部曲
9. Don't Say / 不說 (Bù shuō)
10. See / 看見

== DVD ==
1. Singing in the Trees / 在樹上唱歌 MV
2. Understand / 明白 MV
3. Heart Wall / 心牆 MV
4. Simple / 簡單 MV
5. Goodbye MV
