= Journey into the Night (album) =

Studio album by William Wei
- Released: March 25, 2014
- Genre: Mandopop
- Length: 46:48
- Language: Mandarin
- Label: Linfair Records
- Producer: 蔡尚文; William Wei

William Wei chronology
| Someone Is Waiting (2012) | Journey into the Night (2014) | It All Started From An Intro (2016) |

Journey into the Night (Chinese: 有所畏; pinyin: Yǒu suǒ wèi) is the third studio album by Taiwanese Mandopop singer-songwriter William Wei. It was released on March 25, 2014, by Linfair Records. The album consists of 11 tracks. The theme of the album is about fears and it drew inspirations from the Ang Lee's movie, Life of Pi.

Journey into the Night received 2 nominations at the 26th Golden Melody Awards, including 1 win. The lead single, 'Wolves' (狼) earned Wei the Best Composer award. Wei was also nominated for Best Mandarin Male Singer.

== Track listing ==
All tracks are written by William Wei

| No. | Title | Length |
|---|---|---|
| 1. | "Wolves (狼)" | 4:43 |
| 2. | "Sinking Ship (沈船)" | 4:27 |
| 3. | "Treasure Island (金銀島)" (feat. MATZKA) | 3:54 |
| 4. | "By Your Side (在你身邊)" | 3:42 |
| 5. | "Drained (江郎)" | 3:28 |
| 6. | "Picture of Dorian Gray (格雷的畫像)" | 3:59 |
| 7. | "Mask (面具)" | 4:39 |
| 8. | "Lost (迷路)" (feat. Soft Lipa) | 4:29 |
| 9. | "Survival Guide (生存之道)" | 4:37 |
| 10. | "Sheep (相信誰)" | 4:52 |
| 11. | "Breaking Dawn (曙光)" | 4:53 |
| Total length: | | 46:48 |

== Music videos ==
| # | Title | Director(s) | Year | Ref |
| 1st | Wolves (狼) | March 2014 | 比爾賈 | |
| 2nd | Mask (面具) | March 2014 | 比爾賈 | |
| 3rd | By Your Side (在你身邊) | April 2014 | 黃中平 | |
| 4th | Treasure Island (金銀島) | April 2014 | 許智彥 | |
| 5th | Drained (江郎) | June 2014 | 徐筠庭 | |
| 6th | Sinking Ship (沈船 | September 2014 | 黃中平 | |
