= StreetVoice =

Taiwanese music streaming platform

StreetVoice 街聲
- Developer: StreetVoice International Ltd.
- Available in: Traditional Chinese; Simplified Chinese; English
- Type: Music streaming service
- License: Proprietary
- Website: www.streetvoice.com

StreetVoice (Chinese: 街聲) is a free online music streaming and social networking platform based on user-generated content (UGC), operated by Neutron Innovation. It was founded in 2006 by Chang Pei-jen (張培仁). According to the Taiwan Creative Content Agency, much like SoundCloud in other markets, StreetVoice has become a platform for new artists to share their music to reach new listeners. The website expanded its music library by 16,000 songs in 2018.
