= F One (album) =

Album by Christine Fan

Studio album by Christine Fan
- Released: July 10, 2009
- Genre: Mandopop
- Label: Linfair Records

Christine Fan chronology
Faces of Fanfan (2008)	F One (2009)	Love and FanFan (2011)

F One is FanFan's ninth album which was released on 10 July 2009

== Track listing ==
1. 1到10=我和你 feat. MC HotDog
2. 想知道現在你好不好
3. 起風
4. 灰色的彩虹
5. 傻的可以
6. 對不起
7. 別再生了
8. 沒把握
9. 愛的盲點
10. 微笑說再見
