= William Wei (album) =

Studio album by William Wei
- Released: 4 June 2010; 17 August 2010 (Night Edition)
- Genre: Mandopop
- Length: 39:49
- Language: Mandarin
- Label: Linfair Records
- Producer: 蔡尚文

William Wei chronology
Slowly Wait (2009)	William Wei (2010)	The Fleeing of a Two-Legged Bookcase (2011)

Other Cover
- Cover for Night Edition

William Wei (Chinese: 韋禮安同名創作專輯; pinyin: Wéi lǐ' ān tóng míng chuàng zuò zhuān jí) is the self-titled debut studio album by Taiwanese Mandopop singer-songwriter William Wei. It was released on 4 June 2010, by Linfair Records. The album consists of 10 tracks, of which 2 are newly arranged. A 'Night Edition' of the album was released by Linfair Records on 17 August 2010, and was limited to 5,000 copies worldwide.

The album received 4 nominations at the 22nd Golden Melody Awards, including 1 win. It was nominated for Best Mandarin Album, and 'Have or Have Not' (有沒有) earned Wei a nomination for Best Composer. Wei was also nominated for Best Mandarin Male Singer and eventually won Best New Artist.

== Track listing ==
All tracks are written by William Wei

William Wei – Standard version
No.	Title	Length
1.	"Have or Have Not (有沒有)"	4:12
2.	"The Fleeing of a Two-Legged Bookcase (兩腳書櫥的逃亡)"	3:42
3.	"Story (故事)"	3:34
4.	"Because of Love (因為愛)"	4:05
5.	"Slowly Wait (慢慢等)" (New Arrangement)	3:53
6.	"Translation Exercise (翻譯練習)"	4:03
7.	"Reasons (理由)"	3:24
8.	"Cloudy Sunflower (陰天的向日葵)"	4:52
9.	"A Little Bit More Perfect (完美一點)"	4:07
10.	"Good Weather (好天氣)" (New Arrangement)	3:57
Total length:		39:49

== Music videos ==
#	Title	Director(s)	Year	Ref
1st	Have or Have Not (有沒有)	徐筠庭	May 2010	
2nd	Because of Love (因為愛)	徐筠庭	June 2010	
3rd	Slowly Wait (慢慢等)	邱柏翰、鄒奕笙	June 2010	
4th	Good Weather (好天氣)	邱柏翰、鄒奕笙	July 2010	
5th	Cloudy Sunflower (陰天的向日葵)	黃中平	August 2010	
6th	The Fleeing of a Two-Legged Bookcase (兩腳書櫥的逃亡)	黃中平	August 2010	
