= William Wei =

Taiwanese singer-songwriter

- 韋禮安
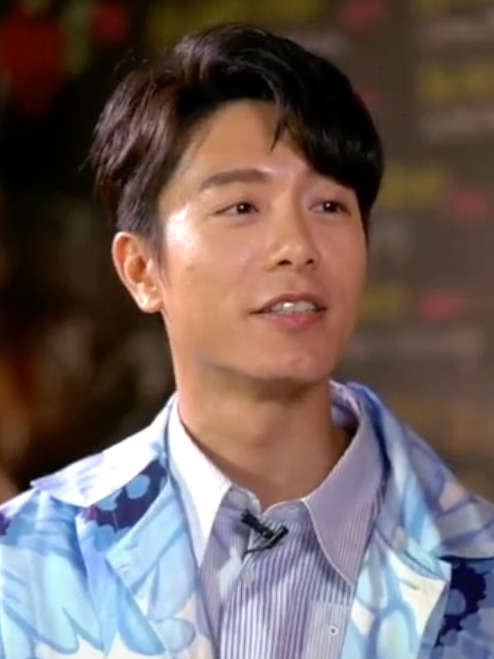
- Wei in 2020
- Born: Wei Li-an; 5 March 1987 (age 39); Taichung, Taiwan
- Education: National Taiwan University (BA)
- Occupations: Singer; songwriter
- Years active: 2006–present
- Musical career
- Also known as: Wei; WeiBird
- Origin: Taiwan
- Genres: Mandopop
- Instruments: Vocals; guitar
- Labels: Linfair Records (2007–2018; Awesome Music (2018–2020); Sony Music (2020–present)

Chinese name
- Traditional Chinese: 韋禮安
- Simplified Chinese: 韦礼安
Transcriptions
Standard Mandarin
- Hanyu Pinyin: Wéi lǐ-ān

Wei Li-an (Chinese: 韋禮安; pinyin: Wéi Lǐ-ān; born 5 March 1987), known professionally as WeiBird, is a Taiwanese singer-songwriter. He has released six studio albums, one live album and two extended plays. Wei won the Golden Melody Award for Best New Singer in 2011 and Best Composer in 2015.

Wei gained media attention as the winner of the first season of the reality television singing competition Happy Sunday in 2007. He released his eponymous debut album William Wei in 2010, which received 4 nominations at the 22nd Golden Melody Awards and subsequently won him the Best New Artist award. His third studio album Journey into The Night received 2 nominations at the 26th Golden Melody Awards and the lead single "Wolves" (狼) won him the Best Composer award.

In 2021, Wei was nominated in four categories at the 32nd Golden Melody Awards for the album Sounds of My Life. Wei also received a nomination at the 58th Golden Horse Awards for Best Original Film Song with "Red Scarf" (如果可以). The song is also nominated for Song of the Year at the 33rd Golden Melody Awards.

== Life and career ==
=== 1987–2005: Early life ===
Wei grew up in Taichung, Taiwan. His parents, Wei Chin-long (韋金龍) and Chen Yu-mei (陳玉美), were both professors in the foreign languages departments of National Chung Hsing University and National Chung Cheng University, respectively.

Wei's grandfather was a songwriter and both of his parents were previously choir members. Wei grew under their influences and has developed great sensitivity toward music. However, Wei did not pick up any music instruments when he was a child as he felt it would be tiring. Instead, Wei enjoyed drawing and wanted to become a comic artist when he grew up.

During his high school, Wei's father bought him his first guitar and he developed a passion for the instrument. He began learning the basic chords on his own and practiced it whenever he was free. Wei was inspired to start writing his own songs after watching a songwriting showcase by his school music club. He started composing songs and posted his works onto StreetVoice, a music-publishing platform for independent songwriters. His songs were very well received by the Netizens and Wei became one of the most popular songwriters on StreetVoice. Although most of Wei's works were notably Folk Pop, he also experimented with different music genres such as Bossa Nova, R&B, Soul Jazz and Disco.

=== 2006–2008: Happy Sunday ===
Wei was accepted into one of the top universities in Taiwan, National Taiwan University, and pursued a major in Foreign Languages. In 2006, Wei decided to sign up for a school singing competition for fun and he performed Black Humor (黑色幽默) by Jay Chou. He won the competition unexpectedly and was selected to represent his school in the reality television singing competition, Happy Sunday. In the competition, Wei consistently impressed the judges with his good performances. He covered songs from many singers including David Tao, Stefanie Sun, Wang Leehom. Wei ultimately won the competition and was crowned the first winner of Happy Sunday.

However, Wei did a shocking decision by turning down the prize contract from the partnering music label. He decided to put his budding music career on hiatus and continues his study. Wei felt that he was not ready to become a singer and he did not want to be bonded by a contract. In addition, he was uncomfortable with the sudden fame and wanted to take a break after the intense singing competition. Wei returned to his student life and continued publishing his songs on StreetVoice. Wei's works dominated the music charts on StreetVoice and many of his works remained in the top ten positions for more than two years. He started writing songs for singers such as FanFan, Angela Zhang and Rene Liu.

=== 2009–2010: Slowly Wait, William Wei, The Fleeing of a Two-Legged Bookcase ===
In 2009, Wei decided to sign a record deal with Linfair Records. Wei released his first EP on 13 March 2009, titled Slowly Wait (慢慢等). It consists of two tracks 'Slowly Wait' (慢慢等) and Good Weather (好天氣). Both songs were fan favourites from StreetVoice. He began promoting his EP by touring 14 live houses in Taiwan. Wei also launched WeiTV, a parody channel on YouTube, to promote his first EP. Subsequently, Wei released his first self-titled debut studio album (韋禮安同名創作專輯) on 4 June 2010. The album was a commercial success and was the seventh best selling album on the major online bookstore (博客來) in 2010. A 'Night' edition of the album was released on 17 August 2010 and was limited to 5,000 copies worldwide. The second hit, Because of Love (因為愛), charted 13th on the overall KKBOX digital music chart in 2010.

Wei's debut album received positive reviews from the critics. It was selected as one of the top 10 mandarin albums in 2010 by the Chinese Musicians' Association and Hit FM. Wei received nominations 4 different categories in the prestigious 22nd Golden Melody Awards. The album was nominated for Best Mandarin Album and lead single, 'Have or Have Not' (有沒有) earned Wei a nomination for Best Composer. Wei was also nominated for Best Mandarin Male Singer and eventually won Best New Artist. Wei held his first nationwide concert tour, The Fleeing of a Two-Legged Bookcase (兩腳書櫥的逃亡), on 18 September 2010 at the Taipei International Convention Center to a crowd of 3000. He covered songs from his debut album and some of his all-time favourite songs by other artistes. The concert was recorded for live release. The Fleeing of a Two-Legged Bookcase was later held in Taichung on 25 September 2010.

=== 2011–2013: The Bird That Saved The World, Someone Is Waiting and Through My Lenses ===
Wei was conscripted for mandatory military service in late 2010. He served as the ambassador for the anti-drug campaign during his military service. During this period, Wei continued to write songs in preparation for his second studio album. Wei completed his 13-month military service and was discharged on 25 December 2011. Linfair Records invested over NT 1 billion in filming a movie specifically for Wei, titled The Bird That Saved The World (什麼鳥日子). The filming was completed within a tight schedule of sixteen days back in 2010. The movie was released on 6 April 2012 in Taiwan. An accompanying soundtrack was released earlier on 12 January 2012 in support of the movie.

Following the success of his first album, Wei's second album Someone Is Waiting was released on 3 August 2012. The album received rave reviews from critics and fans. Both Chinese Musicians' Association and Hit FM have shortlisted the album as one of the top 10 best albums in 2012. "Still" (還是會), one of the songs in Someone Is Waiting, won the Best Soundtrack of the Year award in the KKBOX Music Award. "Still" charted at 10th on the overall KKBOX digital music chart in 2012. Wei held his second concert tour Through My Lenses concert at Hong Kong and Taipei. Both concerts were fully sold-out.

=== 2014: Journey into The Night ===
Wei released his third studio album, Journey into The Night, on 25 March 2014. Unlike the previous two albums, Journey into The Night leaned towards a darker artistic direction. Inspired by Ang Lee's movie Life of Pi, Wei faced his worst fears in his third album and experimented with metal rock, hip-hop, 2-step, electronic and rock. Wei also distinctively changed his public image to appear more mature and masculine. In the music video of lead single 'Wolves', Wei shed his boy-next-door image and transformed into a bloodthirsty werewolf. In promotion of the album, a three-dimensional art installation titled 'Bird and Wolf' was exhibited at the Huashan 1914 Creative Park. Wei also embarked on By Your Side (在你身邊) concert promotional tour, and visited Kaohsiung, Taichung, Taipei, Kuala Lumpur and Beijing.

The album was a commercial success and was the fifth best selling album on the major online bookstore (博客來) in 2014. It was also the seventh most streamed album on music streaming platform KKBOX. The third single, 'By Your Side' (在你身邊) was ranked 5th on the overall KKBOX digital music chart in 2014. Journey into The Night received generally positive reviews, with critics praising Wei for expanding and integrating more styles into his base of folk and alternative rock. The album received 2 nominations at the 26th Golden Melody Awards. Wei was nominated for Best Mandarin Male Singer and 'Wolves' earned Wei the Best Composer Award.

In October 2014, Wei filmed his second movie, The Grand Song (侗族大歌). The filming took place at the villages in Guizhou. Wei was invited by theatre director Edward Lam to perform the theme song of theatre play What Is Sex? (紅樓夢). Wei performed 'May Have Been', the theme song of the play, at the very last scene. 'What Is Sex?' ran at Taiwan National Theater and Concert Hall from 26 to 28 December 2015.

=== 2015–2017: Free That Girl and It All Started From An Intro ===
Wei returned to perform in 'What Is Sex?' at Hong Kong Cultural Centre Grand Theatre from 19 to 20 July 2015. On 12 September 2015, Wei held his third concert, Free That Girl, at the Taipei Arena. In promotion of the concert, Wei released a promotional single titled "Girl" (女孩) on 28 May 2015. Wei also enlisted help from various female artistes including Hong Shi from Taiwanese girl group Popu Lady, Waa Wei and Lala Hsu to promote the concert. Free That Girl performed to a crowd more than 10,000. It was scheduled to be held in Hong Kong on 18 June 2016. In October 2015, Wei returned to tour with theatre play "What Is Sex?" in China. In two months, he performed at 7 cities: Shenzhen, Chengdu, Wuhan, Shanghai, Beijing, Zhuhai and Guangzhou. Wei's rising popularity has won him endorsement deals and opportunities to sing for soundtracks of television drama series. In a span of two years, Wei released nine digital singles, including the hit song, "Don't Say" (別說沒愛過). At the 2015 overall KKBOX digital music chart, "Girl" was ranked at 9th and "Don't Say" was ranked at 11th.

Wei held his Free That Girl concert in Hong Kong on 18 June 2016. Wei's fourth album 'It All Started From An Intro' was scheduled for release on 16 August 2016. Wei released his fourth studio album, It All Started from an Intro, on 16 August 2016. In this album, Wei continues to experiment with different music genres such as Argentine tango, electronic dance music, pop, R&B, fingerstyle guitar etc. At the 12th KKBOX Music Award, Wei was one of the ten recipients honoured with the 'Artist of the Year' award. The award is given to the top ten performing artists on KKBOX based on total music streaming volume. Wei lent his voice to the role of Brainy Smurf in the 2017 animated Sony Pictures film Smurfs: The Lost Village.

=== 2018–2020: Contractual Dispute, At Thirty, Sounds Of My Life, After Thirty ===
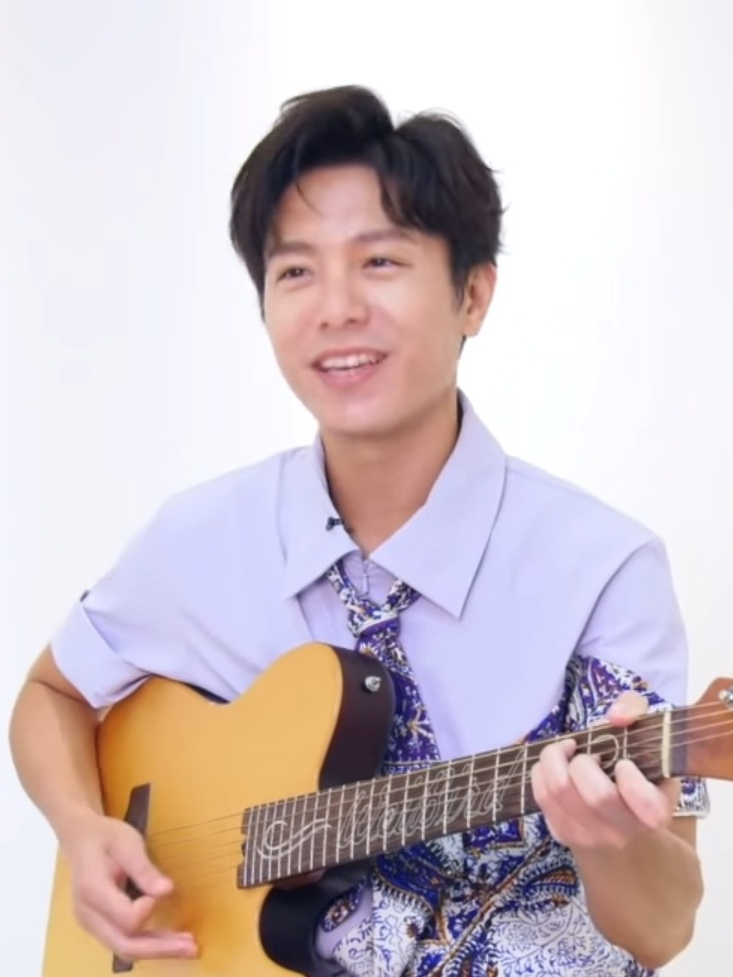
Wei in 2020

On 2 September 2018, Wei announced he has left his record label, Linfair Records and established his own music label, Awesome Music. His news of departure was not well-taken by his previous label, which accused Wei had arbitrarily claimed that his contract had expired. As such, Linfair Records has filed a lawsuit against Wei. Wei eventually won the lawsuit after embroiling in a 2 years legal battle with Linfair Records. Wei released a new single 'At Thirty' on 13 September 2018, which became the promotional single for his 'At Thirty World Tour'. Compromising of 10 shows, the tour visited 8 major cities in China and is scheduled to visit Singapore and Malaysia.

On 29 April 2020, Wei released his 5th studio album titled Sounds of My Life. The theme behind this album circles around Wei's 'Documentary of Sounds' as he translates his life and emotions into music. For this album, Wei also experimented a variety of genres in his album, from pop, folk, rock to even R&B. Later in December 2020, Weibird performed 2 sold-out shows of 'After Thirty' at the Taipei Pop Music Centre. Sounds of My Life received 4 nominations at the 32nd Golden Melody Awards. The album was nominated for Album of the Year and Best Mandarin Album. Wei was also nominated for Best Mandarin Male Singer and 'I Wrote A Song For You' earned Wei a nomination for Best Composer.

=== 2021–present: Red Scarf and I'm More Sober When I'm Drunk ===
In 2021, Wei released "Just Stay With Me", which served as the opening credit song for television series Tears on Fire. He later participated at reality talent show Sing! China and joined Team Li Ronghao. He was subsequently eliminated in the Cross Knockouts round. Wei was invited by Giddens Ko to compose a song for his movie Till We Meet Again which was adapted from his novel 'Yue Lao' (月老). Wei co-wrote the theme song "Red Scarf" with Jerry C and Ko, which was a commercial success, becoming the biggest hit song in 2021. The song is among the list of most-viewed Chinese music videos on YouTube and topped music charts in various countries. It was named the 'Song of the Year' by Hit FM in the annual Top 100 countdown. Due to the song's popularity, Wei released the song in Korean and Japanese for the movie's international releases. "Red Scarf" was well received by music critics and was nominated Best Original Film Song at 58th Golden Horse Awards and Song of the Year at the 33rd Golden Melody Awards. Wei was also honoured Artist of the Year at the 17th KKBOX Music Awards Ceremony.

In the same year, Wei released his first English album I'm More Sober When I'm Drunk. The album is inspired from Wei's past heartbreak experiences which includes drowning his sorrows in alcohol. The album was well-received and named one of the Top 10 Album of the Year by Hit FM. The lead single 'R.I.P.' topped the Western Single Chart on KKBOX. Wei announced his new concert 'See You Tomorrow' which will be held at Taipei Arena and all two shows were sold out within minutes after going on sale.

== Endorsements ==
Wei has been a spokesperson for many popular brands including Lipton, Microsoft Office 365 and Cotton USA. In many of his endorsements, Wei specially wrote songs for the brands such as 'Playing Games' (玩遊戲) for Microsoft Office 365 and 'Mirror of Sanctity' (崑崙鏡) for ARPG mobile game 'Xuan-Yuan Sword: Mirror of Sanctity'.

Wei was also the ambassador for World Vision Taiwan on numerous occasions. In 2013, Wei was first appointed as the ambassador for World Vision Taiwan's "Love Loaf" campaign and travelled to Armenia to bring awareness about combating poverty and improving the lives of children and their families. In 2014, he continued his ambassadorial role and visited Bosnia and Herzegovina. Subsequently, Claire Kuo joined Wei and visited Zambia in 2015 to raise awareness about issues such as water scarcity, malnutrition and diseases.

Name	Year	Note	Ref.
Angelia & Pets – Kido Bag	2012		
Vitalon – 御茶園	2012	With Puff Kuo	
World Vision Taiwan	2013	Travelled to Armenia	
KKBOX	2013	With Yoga Lin and Lala Hsu	
Cotton USA	2014		
World Vision Taiwan	2014	Travelled to Bosnia and Herzegovina	
World Vision Taiwan	2015	Travelled to Zambia with Claire Kuo	
Microsoft Office 365	2015		
Xuan-Yuan Sword: Mirror of Sanctity	2015		
Lipton	2016		
Cotton USA	2016	With Cindy Yen	
Quaker Oats Soy Milk	2016		
Pringles	2017		
ETALKING	2018		
Hai Zhi Yan Sea Salt Lemon Water – 海之言	2018		
Taiwan Beer	2018		
World Vision Taiwan	2018	Travelled to Uganda with Jasper Liu	
Bohemian Rhapsody	2018	Bohemian Rhapsody Global Influencer Program	
ETALKING	2019		
Hai Zhi Yan Sea Salt Lemon Water – 海之言	2019		
Lexus IS 300h	2020	With Nike Chen	
ENYA NEXG Smart Audio Guitar	2022		
ECOVACS DEEBOT X1 Robotic Vacuum	2022		
EDIFIER TO-U2 mini Bluetooth Earbuds	2022		
Darlie	2022		

== Discography ==
- William Wei (2010)
- Someone Is Waiting (2012)
- Journey into The Night (2014)
- It All Started From An Intro (2016)
- Sounds of My Life (2020)
- I'm More Sober When I'm Drunk (2021)
- Good Afternoon Good Evening and Goodnight (2022)

== Filmography ==
=== Film ===
Year	Title	Director	Role	Notes
2012	The Bird Who Saved The Day (什麼鳥日子)	鄒奕笙, 邱柏翰	Himself	
2012	I Love My Job	陳立謙	Himself and Kai Wen (凱文)	Short film
2016	The Grand Song (侗族大歌)	丑丑	Qian Shu (千樹)	
2017	Smurfs: The Lost Village	Kelly Asbury	Brainy Smurf	Taiwanese release, voice

=== Theater ===
Title	Year	Director	Role
2014	What Is Sex? (紅樓夢)	Edward Lam	Narrator

== Concerts ==
- The Fleeing of a Two-Legged Bookcase 兩腳書櫥的逃亡 (2010)
- Through My Lenses 印象派 (2012)
- Free That Girl 放開那女孩 (2015–17)
- At Thirty 而立 (2019–20)
- After Thirty 而立之後 (2020)
- See You Tomorrow 如果可以，我想和你明天再見（2022）
- 如果可以，我想合你明天再见 again (2024)

== Awards and nominations ==
Year	Award	Category	Nominated work	Result	Ref.
2011	22nd Golden Melody Awards	Best Album in Mandarin	William Wei	Nominated	
2011	22nd Golden Melody Awards	Best Mandarin Male Singer	William Wei	Nominated	
2011	22nd Golden Melody Awards	Best Composer	"Have or Have Not"	Nominated	
2011	22nd Golden Melody Awards	Best New Artist	William Wei	Won	
2011	Association of Music Workers in Taiwan	Top 10 Album	William Wei	Won	
2013	8th KKBOX Music Awards	Best Soundtrack of the Year	"Still"	Won	
2013	Association of Music Workers in Taiwan	Top 10 Album	Someone_Is_Waiting	Won	
2015	26th Golden Melody Awards	Best Mandarin Male Singer	Journey into The Night	Nominated	
2015	26th Golden Melody Awards	Best Composer	"Wolves"	Won	
2015	Association of Music Workers in Taiwan	Top 10 Songs	"Wolves"	Won	
2017	12th KKBOX Music Awards	Artist of the Year	–	Won	
2021	32nd Golden Melody Awards	Album of the Year	Sounds of My Life	Nominated	
2021	32nd Golden Melody Awards	Best Album in Mandarin	Sounds of My Life	Nominated	
2021	32nd Golden Melody Awards	Best Mandarin Male Singer	Sounds of My Life	Nominated	
2021	32nd Golden Melody Awards	Best Composer	"I Wrote A Song For You"	Nominated	
2021	Association of Music Workers in Taiwan	Top 10 Album	Sounds of My Life	Won	
2021	58th Golden Horse Awards	Best Original Film Song	"Red Scarf"	Nominated	
2022	17th KKBOX Music Awards	Artist of the Year		Won	
2022	Hit FM Top 100 Countdown	Song of the Year	"Red Scarf"	Won	
2022	33rd Golden Melody Awards	Song of the Year	"Red Scarf"	Nominated	
