= Claire Kuo =

Taiwanese singer and television host

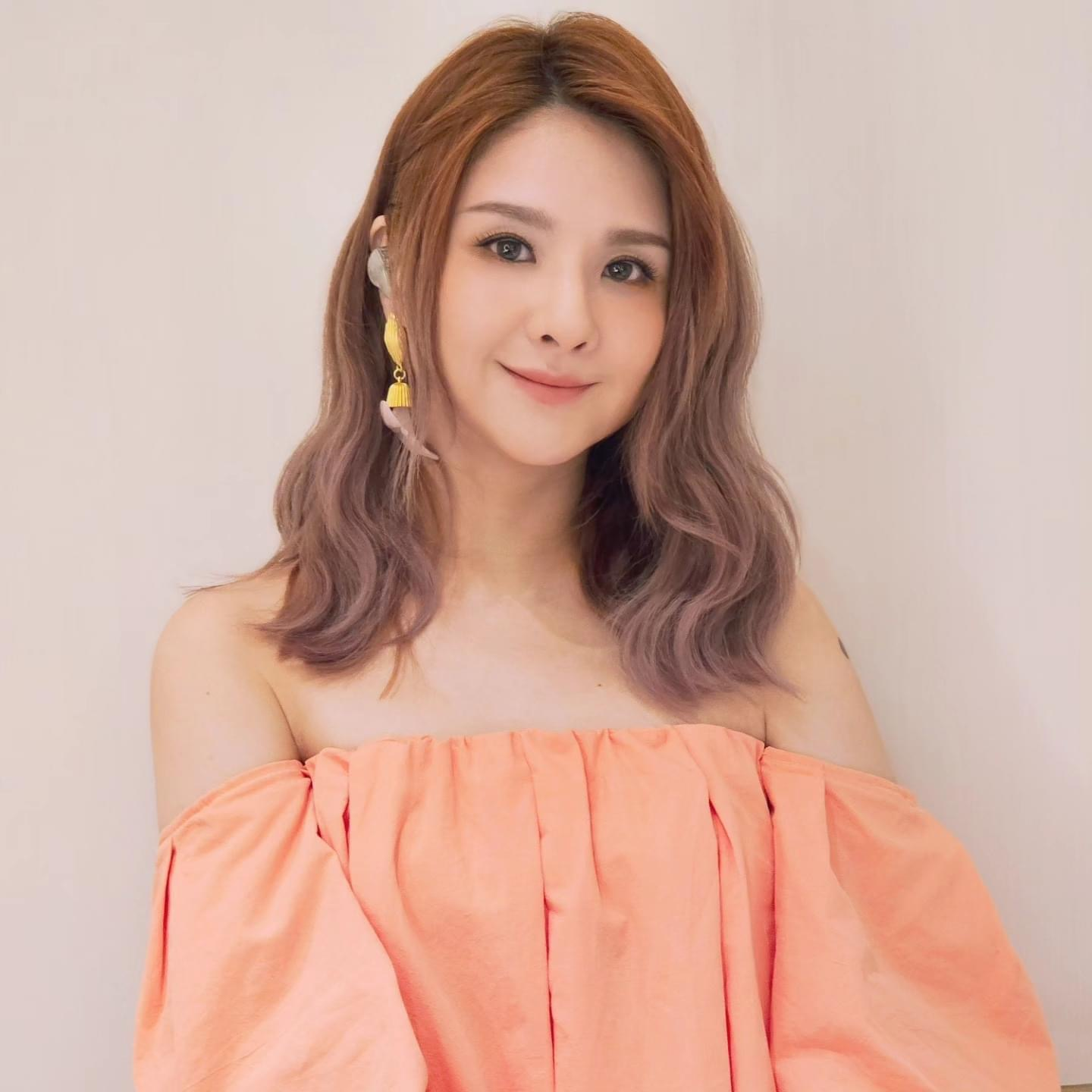
- Kuo in Oct. 2023
- Born: Kuo Po-yu; 5 August 1980 (age 46); British Hong Kong
- Education: Shih Hsin University
- Occupations: Singer, television host
- Years active: 2007–present
- Musical career
- Also known as: Kuo Ching; Guo Jing
- Genres: Mandopop
- Labels: Linfair Records (2003-2017); Shanghai Feibao Cultural Communications (2018-2022); CTC Entertainment (2022-present)

Chinese name
- Traditional Chinese: 郭靜
- Simplified Chinese: 郭静
- Hanyu Pinyin: Guō Jìng
- Jyutping: Gwok3 Zing6

Birth name
- Chinese: 郭伯瑜
- Hanyu Pinyin: Guō Bóyú

Claire Kuo (born Kuo Po-yu on 5 August 1980) is a Taiwanese singer and television host.

The daughter of a restaurant owner, Kuo graduated from Shih Hsin University and was a competitive cheerleader. She performed her final routine in November 2022, at the age of 42. After performing soundtracks for a number of Taiwanese television series, she released her debut album I Don't Want to Forget You in 2007, which garnered her numerous awards including Best Newcomer.

== Discography ==
=== Studio albums ===
Album#	English title	Mandarin title	Release date	Label
1st	I Don't Want to Forget You	我不想忘記你	29 June 2007	Linfair Records
2nd	The Next Dawn	下一個天亮	9 May 2008	Linfair Records
3rd	Singing in the Trees	在樹上唱歌	22 May 2009	Linfair Records
4th	Your Friend	妳 朋友	14 May 2010	Linfair Records
5th	Another She	陪著我的時候想著她	25 August 2011	Linfair Records
6th	Keep Loving	我們都能幸福著	7 December 2012	Linfair Records
7th	Until We Meet	豔遇	26 June 2014	Linfair Records
8th	Loved	我們曾相愛	22 December 2016	Linfair Records

=== Extended plays ===
EP#	English title	Mandarin title	Release date	Label
1st	La Vita è Bella	這一切 還是迷人的	11 November 2015	Linfair Records
2nd	I'm Not Living Alone	我非獨自生活	5 August 2021	Pro Promoting International
3rd	So Lucky	—N/a	5 August 2022	Ho Vision Entertainment

=== Compilation albums ===
Album#	English title	Mandarin title	Release date	Label
1st	To The Age of Innocence	致純靜	30 August 2013	Linfair Records

=== Singles ===
Single#	English title	Mandarin title	Release date	Label
1st	—N/a	我想要有人為我傷心	26 December 2019	Pro Promoting International
2nd	Rainbow Youth	彩虹少年	8 September 2020	NetEase Cloud Music
3rd	Retrograde Subtraction	逆行的減法	27 July 2022	Hangzhou Guangying Suiyue Culture Media
4th	Miāo² Mia	喵喵咪呀	8 July 2023	J.F Entertainment
5th	—N/a	最漫長的告別	22 May 2025	Hangzhou Jiasheng Times Culture Media
6th	—N/a	好像	30 October 2025	Shenzhen Special Music Culture Media; Hangzhou Jiasheng Times Culture Media; Beijing Daogu Music Culture
7th	—N/a	半日閑	10 May 2026	Hangzhou Jiasheng Times Culture Media
8th	I thought	我以為	7 July 2026	Hangzhou Ruyuerzhi Culture Media

=== Other Songs ===
Year	English title	Mandarin title	Remarks
2008	—N/a	微笑的起點	Collaboration with Angela Chang & Christine Fan
2014	—N/a	爛人	Collaboration with Xu Liang
2015	Be OK	—N/a	7-Eleven Kaohsiung Beer Festival Theme Song
2025	The Next Dawn	下一個天亮	Collaboration with Arrow Wei
2025	I Just Wanna Love You	我不在意你曾經吻過誰	Collaboration with Arrow Wei
2025	—N/a	苦糖	Collaboration with Rennie Wang

== Filmography ==
=== Variety and reality show ===
Year	English title	Mandarin title	Network	Notes
2013	Super Idol 8	超級偶像8	SET Metro	Host
2014	Super Idol 9	超級偶像9	SET Metro	Host, episode 1-13
2014-2015	Taste the World	美食第一等	GTV	Host
2015-2016	Global Chinese Music	全球中文音樂榜上榜	TVBS Entertainment Channel	Guest host
2017-2018	Stars Talk	星鮮話	TVBS	Host
2022	Mr. Player	綜藝玩很大	SET Metro	Season regular

=== Film ===
Year	English title	Mandarin title	Role	Notes
2009	L-O-V-E	愛到底	Promoter	Cameo, segment "Di liu hao liu hai nan sheng"
2022	Every Classic Habit Ever	怪癖的經典語錄		Short film
2022	Difficult Customers Vs. Difficult Servers	奧客大戰奧服務員		Short film

=== Music video appearances ===
Year	Artist	Song title
2004	Will Pan	"Who Is MVP"
2005	Stefanie Sun	"Dreams Still Alive"
2010	Huang Yali	"Xiang Ni Xiao"
2015	Vivian Chow	"Yi Kao"

== Theater ==
Year	Title	Notes
2021	The Most Beautiful 5 Minutes in My Life	Godot Theatre

== Awards and nominations ==
Year	Award	Category	Nominated work	Result
2009	20th Golden Melody Awards	Song of the Year	"The Next Dawn"	Nominated
2010	21st Golden Melody Awards	Song of the Year	"Singing in the Trees"	Nominated
