= Girl (William Wei song) =

Single by William Wei
- Released: May 28, 2015
- Genre: Pop; Disco
- Length: 5:06
- Label: Linfair Records
- Songwriter: William Wei

William Wei singles chronology
"May Have Been" (2015)	"Girl" (2015)	"Don't Say" (2015)

Girl (Chinese: 女孩; pinyin: Nǚhái) is a song recorded by Taiwanese mandopop singer-songwriter William Wei. The song was written by Wei and arranged by JerryC. It was released as a single by Linfair Records on May 28, 2015. "Girl" was released in support of Wei's third concert, Free That Girl. It was later used as the opening theme song of the television series Baby Daddy.

"Girl" received positive reviews and was a commercial success. The music video featuring Xie Yilin was released on June 2, 2016. It was directed by Kidding (許智彥).

== Background and composition ==
Written by Wei and arranged by JerryC, "Girl" is a pop song that incorporates elements of disco. Despite appearing to be about a boy's confession for a girl, "Girl" was actually written from the perspective of a father to his daughter. Wei explained the inspiration came from the unique bond he observed between his producer and his producer's daughter. He realised that there are not many Chinese songs that talks about a father's selfless love and unconditional devotion for his child. Hence, Wei decided to pen a song that touches on a father's love for his daughter. The lyrics encapsulated the endless wishes and unconditional love by a father for his daughter.

== Music video ==
The accompanying music video for "Girl" was directed by Kidding. The music video premiered on YouTube and YinYueTai on June 3, 2015. In the beginning of the video, a young Wei was seen flirting with his female schoolmate. However, Wei's parents soon found out about the relationship and the relationship had to come to an end. After Wei grew up, he attempted to date a voluptuous lady. On his first date, Wei brought her to a posh restaurant for dinner. However, the date came to an end once the voluptuous lady found out that Wei was not from a wealthy background. Wei subsequently dated 10 different girls in music video but he was not able to find the right one. Xie Yilin made a guest appearance as one of the Wei's potential dates. As the song ends, Wei finally found the girl of his dream.

== Live performances ==
Recognized as one of Wei's most popular songs, Wei has performed "Girl" at a number of venues and events. The song was first sung at the press conference for "Free That Girl" concert. A rap inspired from Stephen Chow's movies was included during the performance. The song was also performed at the encore segment of "Free That Girl" concert in 2015. "Girl" was also sung on various music awards such as KKBOX Music Awards and HITO Music Awards. The song was also included on Wei's set lists for his 2016 New Year Countdown performances at Taipei, Janfusun Fancyworld and Fulong Beach.

== Awards and nominations ==
Year	Award	Category	Result
2015	15th Global Chinese Music Chart	Top 20 Songs of the Year	Nominated
