= Don't Say (William Wei song) =

Single by William Wei
- Released: September 1, 2015
- Genre: Pop
- Length: 3:54
- Label: Linfair Records
- Songwriter(s): William Wei

William Wei singles chronology
"Girl" (2015)	"Don't Say" (2015)	"Play Game" (2015)

"Don't Say" (traditional Chinese: 別說沒愛過; simplified Chinese: 别说没爱过; pinyin: Bié shuō méi àiguò) is a song recorded by Taiwanese Mandopop singer-songwriter William Wei. The song was written by Wei as the opening theme song for the television series To the Dearest Intruder. It was released as a single by Linfair Records on September 1, 2015.

"Don't Say" received positive reviews and was a commercial success. At the 2015 KKBOX Year-end chart, "Don't Say" was the 11th most streamed song in Taiwan.

The music video was directed by Howard Kuo and Allan Shen and was released on November 3, 2015.

== Background and composition ==
Written by Wei, "Don't Say" is a pop ballad that talks about the end of a relationship. In a radio interview, Wei siad that the inspiration of the song came from the movie Eternal Sunshine of the Spotless Mind, which focuses on two lovers who have each other erased from their memories when their relationship turned sour. Wei believed that one should never relinquish the memories of the other half, no matter how unbearably painful they are. Without the bad ones, we would never be able to appreciate the good ones.

== Music video ==
The music video for "Don't Say" was directed by Howard Kuo and Allan Shen. It premiered on YouTube and QQ Music on November 4, 2015. The video begins with Wei boarding a bus. He sits at the back and starts observing a girl who appears to be upset. The girl later receives a text message from her boyfriend, asking if she loves him. Inspired by the scene he saw, Wei starts writing lyrics on his notebook. After much struggle, the girl decides to tell her boyfriend that she does not love him at all. As the bus reaches the terminal, Wei stands up and prepares to get off. Before the video ends, Wei takes one last look at the girl and decides to change a line of the lyrics that he has written.

== Live performances ==
Wei performed "Don't Say" on a number of shows. Wei performed the song for the first time at his "Free That Girl" concert, held at Taipei Arena. Wei also performed the song at the KKBOX Music Awards and QQ Music Awards. The song was also included on Wei's set list for his 2016 New Year Countdown performances at Taipei, Janfusun Fancyworld and Fulong Beach.

== Awards and nominations ==
Year	Award	Category	Result
2016	2015 ON MUSIC Pop Music Chart	Top 10 Songs of the Year	Won
2016	2016 QQ Music Awards	Best Television Soundtrack	Won
2016	6th Global Chinese Golden Chart	Most Popular Song of The Year	Nominated
2016	16th Global Chinese Music Chart	Top 20 Song of The Year	Won
