= Until We Meet =

Until We Meet 豔遇

Studio album by Claire Kuo
- Released: 26 June 2014
- Genre: Mandopop
- Language: Mandarin
- Label: Linfair Records

Claire Kuo chronology
To The Age of Innocence 致純靜 (2013)	Until We Meet 豔遇 (2014)

Until We Meet (simplified Chinese: 艳遇; traditional Chinese: 豔遇) is the 7th studio album by Claire Kuo. It was released on 26 June 2014 by Linfair Records.

== Track listing ==
No.	Title	Pinyin title	Length
1.	"Not Over You" (不還)	Bu Huan	4:20
2.	"Part-Time Lover" (即溶愛人)	Ji Rong Ai Ren	3:16
3.	"The Very Last Day" (分手的第-1天)	Fen Shou De Di -1 Tian	3:56
4.	"My Little Safe Place" (我的小森林)	Wo De Xiao Shen Lin	4:14
5.	"Spilling Autumn" (秋風舞黃葉)	Qiu Feng Wu Huang Ye	4:41
6.	"Whatever" (還有什麼好在意)	Hai You Shen Me Hao Zai Yi	4:15
7.	"The Place We’ve Been" (在曾有你的地方)	Zai Ceng You Ni De Di Fang	4:33
8.	"You Make Me Float" (愛擔心)	Ai Dan Xin	4:22
9.	"I Am Not Your Love Song" (我不是你的那首情歌)	Wo Bu Shi Ni De Na Shou Qing Qe	4:20
10.	"Shine Your Way" (最精彩的豔遇)	Zui Jing Cai De Yan Yu	3:47
11.	"Let’s Fly High" (夢在遠方)	Meng Zai Yuan Fang	4:53
