= Sounds of My Life =

Studio album by William Wei
- Released: April 29, 2020
- Genre: Mandopop
- Length: 63:11
- Language: Mandarin, English
- Label: Awesome Music
- Producer: William Wei; 蔡尚文

William Wei chronology
| It All Started from an Intro (2016) | Sounds of My Life (2020) |

Sounds of My Life is the fifth studio album by Taiwanese Mandopop singer-songwriter William Wei. It was released on April 29, 2020, by The Orchard. Production was done by Wei with Aven Tsai, alongside a variety of collaborators including Derrick Sepnio, Fergus Chew, Cheng Yang Chung, Shang-Chien Chiang and Zell Huang. The theme behind the album circles around Wei's 'Documentary of Sounds' as he translates his life and emotions into music. Musically, the pop album combined a variety of genres in his album, from pop, folk, R&B to even rock. The album is specially dedicated in memory of Wei's grandmother.

The album generally received favorable reviews from music critics. Upon its release, the physical album reached number 1 on all sales charts in Taiwan. Sounds of My Life received 4 nominations at the 32nd Golden Melody Awards, including Album of the Year and Best Mandarin Album. Wei was nominated for Best Male Mandarin Singer and "I Wrote A Song For You" earned Wei a nomination for Best Composition.

== Track listing ==
All tracks are written by William Wei, except where noted.

| No. | Title | Music | Length |
|---|---|---|---|
| 1. | "Sounds of My Life" | | 3:10 |
| 2. | "See You on Monday" | | 4:05 |
| 3. | "Interlude (XYGX)" | | 1:22 |
| 4. | "Toothbrush (房客)" | | 4:12 |
| 5. | "Cat Republic (貓咪共和國)" | | 3:36 |
| 6. | "Don't Tell (不用告訴我)" | | 4:28 |
| 7. | "Interlude (I WROTE A SONG FOR YOU)" | | 0:46 |
| 8. | "Best Meal in the World (一口一口)" | | 3:41 |
| 9. | "World Without You (沒有你的世界)" | | 3:59 |
| 10. | "At Thirty (而立)" | | 5:33 |
| 11. | "How About This (這樣好嗎)" | William Wei; Shang-Chien Chiang; Zell Huang | 3:48 |
| 12. | "Listen to Me (聽我的)" | William Wei; Cheng Yang Chung; Shang-Chien Chiang; Zell Huang | 3:54 |
| 13. | "Interlude (YOU WROTE A SONG FOR ME)" | | 0:49 |
| 14. | "Brand New" | | 3:10 |
| 15. | "I'll Be Here (記得回來)" | | 4:28 |
| 16. | "I Wrote a Song for You" | | 4:20 |
| 17. | "Credits" | | 7:50 |
| Total length: | | | 63:11 |

== Critical reception ==
Professional ratings
Review scores
| Source | Rating |
|---|---|
| The Straits Times | 4/5 stars |
| Asia Pop Weekly | 4.5/5 stars |
| Play Music | 4.5/5 stars |

Upon its release, Sounds Of My Life received generally acclaims from domestic and international music critics. QQ Music listed the album as one of the top albums in 2020, and it praised Wei for "masterfully incorporating sounds from his daily life into the songs, bringing the album to life". The Straits Times gave the album 4 out of 5 stars, and it wrote "the album can be a little sprawling and unwieldy at times, but then again, so is life." Writing for United Daily News, Zhao Ya-fen described the album as "a documentary-like music album with tremendous efforts in production translating into fine masterpieces“. Jocelle from Asia Pop Daily gave the album 4.5 out of 5 stars, reasoning that she was not disappointed: "the album is everything I expected and more; a tidy yet extravagant compilation of Wei’s experiences, values and principles into a seamless and greatly moving listening experience." She also wrote that "Wei has managed the near impossible; to create a technically wonderful work that does not isolate the average listener". Sounds Of My Life was also named as one of the top 10 best albums of 2020 by Hit FM.

== Music videos ==
| # | Title | Year | Director(s) | Ref |
| 1st | At Thirty (而立) | January 2020 | Arthur Chou | |
| 2nd | Cat Republic (貓咪共和國) | March 2020 | Shaun Su | |
| 3rd | Best Meal in the World (一口一口) | April 2020 | Shaun Su | |
| 4th | Don't Tell (不用告訴我) | April 2020 | Remii Huang | |
| 5th | How About This (這樣好嗎) | May 2020 | Remii Huang | |
| 6th | I'll Be Here (記得回來) | July 2020 | Shaun Su | |
| 7th | Toothbrush (房客) | July 2020 | Chang Ching Yu | |
| 8th | I Wrote a Song for You | August 2020 | - | |
| 9th | Sounds of My Life | September 2020 | Chang Ching Yu | |
| 10th | See You on Monday | October 2020 | Chang Ching Yu | |
| 11th | Listen to Me (聽我的) | November 2020 | Chang Ching Yu | |
| 12th | World Without You (沒有你的世界) | November 2020 | WALL | |
| 13th | Brand New | December 2020 | Chang Ching Yu | |
