= Mirror of Sanctity =

Single by William Wei
- Released: October 27, 2015
- Genre: Pop; Rock
- Length: 3:52
- Label: Linfair Records
- Songwriter: William Wei

William Wei singles chronology
"Playing Games" (2015)	"Mirror of Sanctity" (2015)	"Single" (2016)

"Mirror of Sanctity" (Chinese: 崑崙鏡; pinyin: Kūnlún jìng) is a song recorded by Taiwanese Mandopop singer-songwriter William Wei. The song was recorded and released in support of the mobile game, Xuan-Yuan Sword: Mirror of Sanctity. It was released as a single by Linfair Records on October 27, 2015.

The music video for "Mirror of Sanctity" was directed by Howard Kuo and Allan Shen. It was released on October 26, 2015.

== Background and composition ==
Written and arranged by Wei, "Mirror of Sanctity" incorporates elements from Chinese music with electronic rock. Wei also sampled different battle music from the game series and included them into the song. Since he was young, Wei has been an avid player of Xuan-Yuan Sword series. When Wei knew he had the opportunity to write the theme song for the game, he was extremely excited. The song is believed to be written from the perspective of Yuwen Tuo, a major character from the game. Lyrically, the song discusses that there are no heroes or villains in troubled times. In order for there to be peace, bloodshed is often inevitable.

== Music video ==
The music video was directed by Howard Kuo and Allan Shen. The music video premiered on YouTube and QQ Music on October 27, 2015. The video features a nerdy-looking Wei who is seen playing Xuan-Yuan Sword: Mirror of Sanctity. He is teleported into the game and meets his doppelgänger, who is a game character. The video reveals that Wei's doppelgänger has heterochromia (two different coloured eyes), referencing Yuwen Tuo, a main character from the game. The video ends as Wei is teleported back to reality.
