= KKBox =

Music streaming service

KKBOX
- Company type: Private
- Founded: October 2004; 21 years ago
- Headquarters: Taipei, Taiwan
- Country of origin: Taiwan
- Founders: Chris Lin, Lamber Chien
- CEO: Steve Wang
- Industry: Music
- Services: Music streaming
- Parent: KKCompany Technologies (KDDI; majority owner)
- Website: www.kkbox.com
- Users: 10 million+
- Launched: 2005
- Current status: Active
- Native clients on: Android, iOS, Windows, macOS, tvOS, etc

KKBox, stylized as KKBOX is a music streaming service developed in 2005 by KKBox Inc., a software company in Taipei, Taiwan. It is a part of Japanese Telecom Group, KDDI. The service mainly targets the music markets of East and Southeast Asia, focusing on regions including: Taiwan, Hong Kong, Malaysia, Japan and Singapore. Working on a freemium basis, both paid and free members can listen to over 20 million tunes on smartphones, TVs, media centers and computers.

As a Taiwan-based music streaming software, KKBOX caters mainly to Mandarin-speaking users by collaborating with record companies in the Taiwanese music industry. KKBOX also has close links with Taiwanese artists, and mainstream Mandopop artists like Jay Chou, Eric Chou and Bii.

== Development ==
After launching KKBOX in Taiwan, the company expanded the music streaming service to Hong Kong and Macau in 2009, Japan in 2011, Malaysia, and Singapore in 2013. Starting from 2011, KKBOX received investment from KDDI Corporation, a Japanese telecom who holds 76% of the stocks; HTC Corporation, a smartphone company, and; GIC, a Singaporean Government fund.

KKBOX has operated on Windows, Windows Media Center, Mac OS X, iOS, Android, Symbian, Bada, partly Java, and since 2015 Apple Watch.

In 2006, the first KKBOX Music Awards ceremony was held in Taiwan. Various artists that have performed and been honored including Eason Chan, Jay Chou, Jolin Tsai, Apink, Sekai No Owari. In January 2017, KKBOX announced the winners of its 12th Annual KKBOX Music Awards.

On September 15, 2023, KKBOX parent company, KKCompany, has acquired Taiwan Mobile myMusic streaming platform, in exchanged to have KKBOX available for Taiwan Mobile customers.

KKBOX shut down its services in Malaysia on December 31, 2024, leaving Singapore as the only country outside East Asia to operate the streaming platform.

== Controversy over copyright ==
In 2007, KKBOX was suspected of reproducing musical works and allowed its members to download them without authorization. The works included 324 songs owned by HCM Music and songwriter Chan Kien Ming. KKBOX's owner and manager were prosecuted by Taipei District Prosecutors Office. In 2009, the court held that the case was considered as a civil dispute and the defendants were acquitted.
