= Christine Fan =

Taiwanese-American singer

FanFan
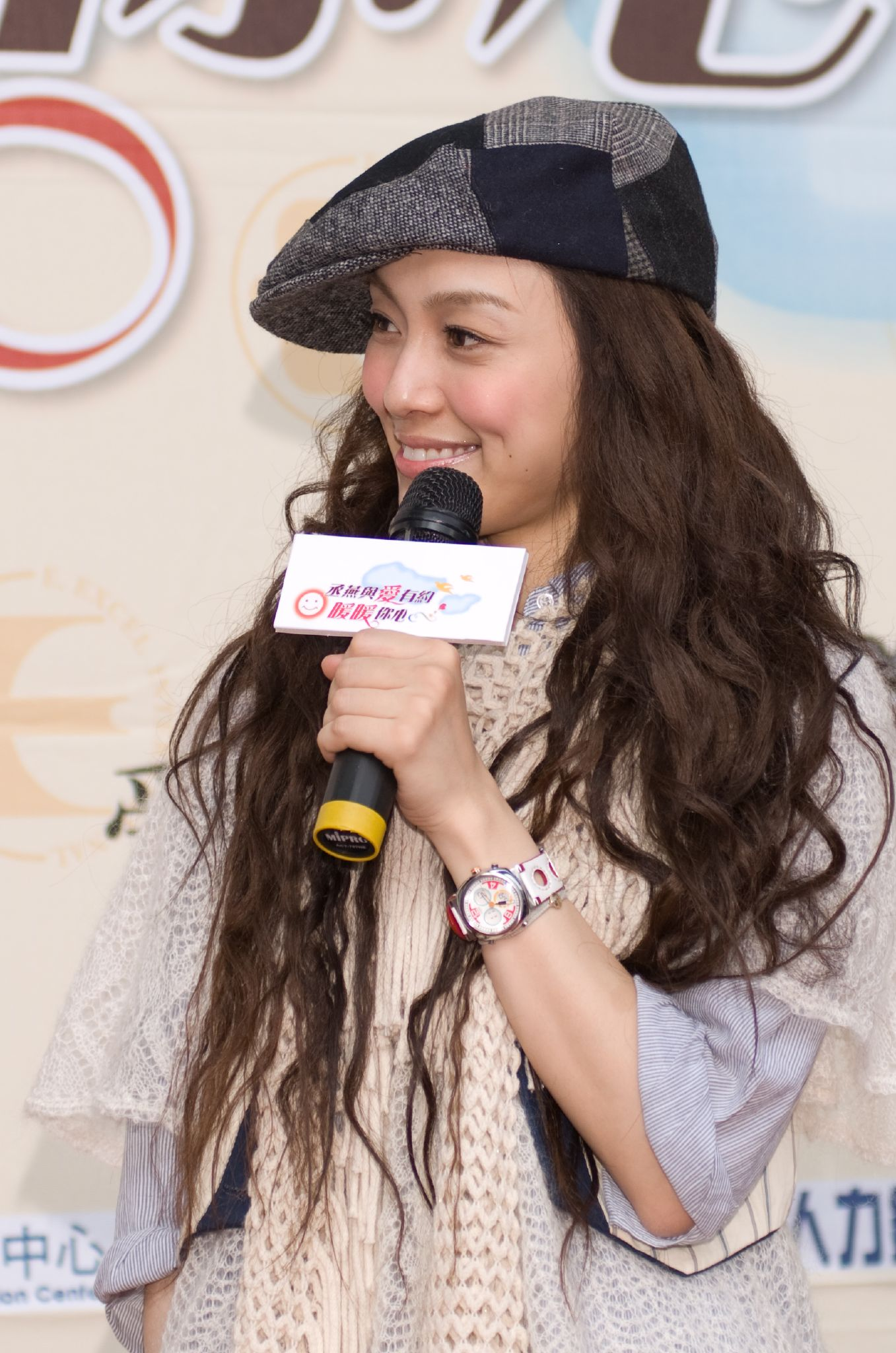
- Fan in 2007
- Born: Christine Fan
- Occupations: Singer; songwriter
- Years active: 1997–present
- Spouse: Blackie Chen (m. 2011)
- Musical career
- Origin: Taiwan
- Genres: Mandopop; folk; alternative; soul
- Label: Linfair Records

Chinese name
- Traditional Chinese: 范瑋琪
- Simplified Chinese: 范玮琪
Transcriptions
Standard Mandarin
- Hanyu Pinyin: Fàn Wěiqí
- Website: www.fanfan.com.tw

Christine Fan Wei-chi (Chinese: 范瑋琪; pinyin: Fàn Wěiqí), also known by her nickname FanFan, is an American singer and TV host based in Taiwan.

== Early life and education ==
FanFan is the elder of two children and has a younger brother. She attended Pomona College, and then transferred in her second year to Harvard Extension School, a distance-education branch of Harvard University. She subsequently dropped out to pursue her musical career.

== Career ==
FanFan hosted the variety show Bang Bang Tang (模范棒棒堂) on Channel [V] in Taiwan and has also starred in various commercials. On November 1, 2008, she held her first ticketed concert in Taipei. She later held concerts in Hong Kong and in the Chinese cities of Taichung and Beijing. She was also the special guest in JJ Lin's concert in Singapore.

FanFan has composed and written lyrics for herself as well as other artists, including Claire Kuo, Angela Chang, Freya Lim, and the girl group Hey Girl. In 2015, she and Blackie Chen founded a talent agent company and signed Kimberley Chen, and she became her mentor, talent agent and record producer while she was pregnant with twin boys.

== Personal life ==
In 2003, because of the pressure of her sudden change in career path suggested by her record company to let her become an actress, FanFan suffered major depressive disorder and mild anorexia. She eventually recovered through her religion and with support from friends. A week after receiving the diagnosis, her doctor committed suicide.

FanFan dated basketball player turned entertainer Blackie Chen for ten years before he proposed on February 17, 2010, during a game between the New Jersey Nets and the Miami Heat at Meadowlands Arena. They had courtside seats cheering for Chen's friend, Nets player Yi Jianlian. She also sang "The Star-Spangled Banner" for the Nets home game against the Memphis Grizzlies on February 21, 2010.) Both Christians, they married on May 7, 2011, at a church in Taipei. Their twin sons were born on January 15, 2015. The couple is active in charity work, most notably co-founding the Love Life campaign.

== Discography ==
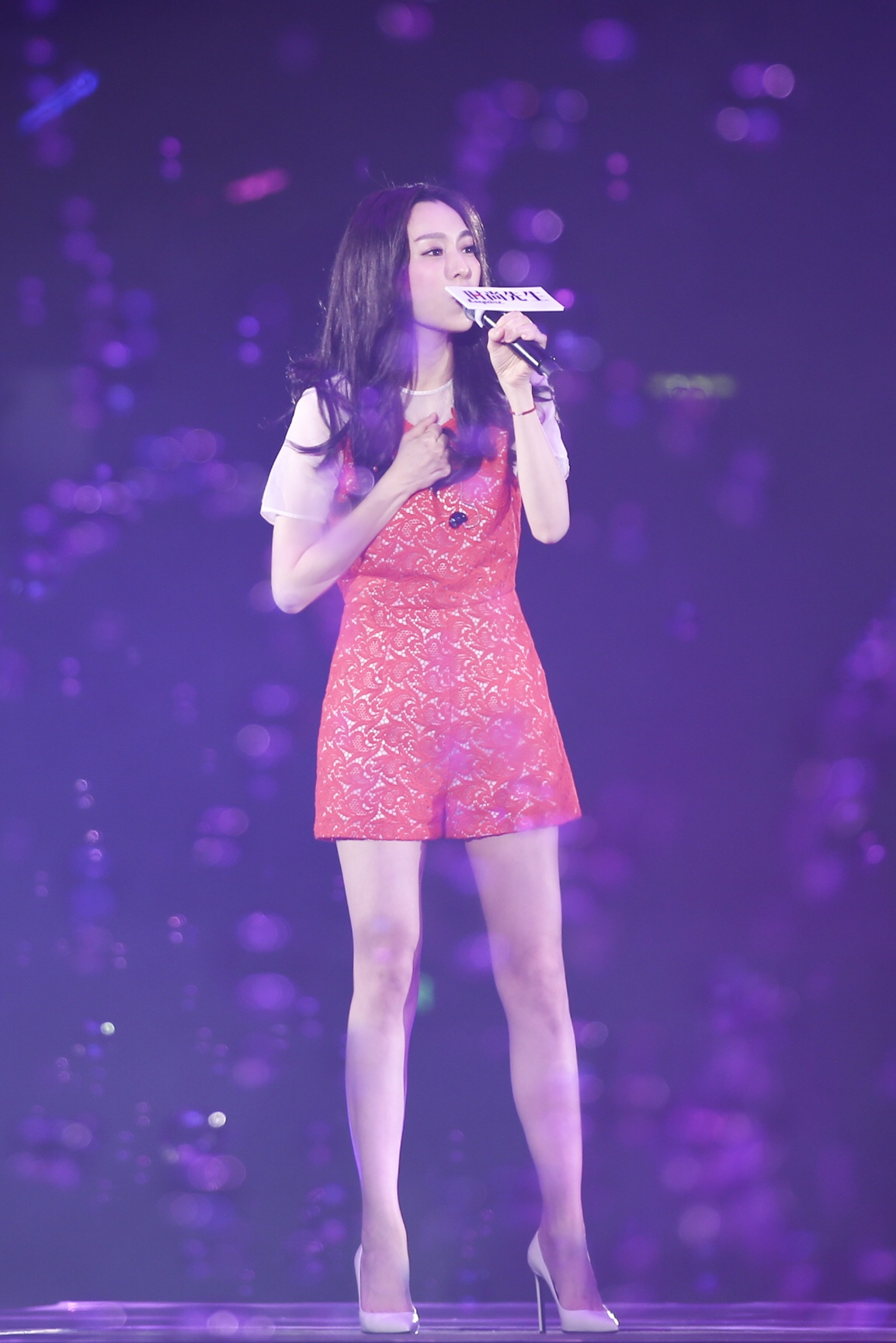
FanFan performing in 2015

- FanFan's World (范范的世界) (2000)
- The Sun (太陽) (2001)
- The Sound of Music (真善美) (2003)
- For Fan – Original Dream (最初的夢想) (2004)
- One to One (一比一) (2005)
- Our Anniversary (我們的紀念日) (2006)
- Philosopher (哲學家) (2007)
- Faces of FanFan (2008)
- F One (2009)
- Love and FanFan (2011)
- Together (愛，在一起) (2012)
- FanFan's Time to Give Thanks (范范的感恩節) (2016)
- Solitary Moment (恰如其分的自己) (2022)

== Filmography ==
=== Film ===
Year	Title	Role	Notes
2008	Attitude (態度)		documentary, music supervisor
2009	Love Life	herself	documentary, also music supervisor
2013	The Stolen Years (被偷走的那五年)		

=== TV dramas ===
Year	Title	Role	Notes
2002	Tomorrow (愛情白皮書)	Ji Xing Hua	
2005	The Sour Pack (醋溜族)	Xiaohong	
2008	Mysterious Incredible Terminator (霹靂MIT)	Tao Mei Ren/Miss Cherry	
2008	The Legend of Brown Sugar Chivalries (黑糖群俠傳)	Dongfang Bu Bai	

== Concerts ==
=== We Are Friends Concerts ===
Date	Location	Venue	Special guests
November 1, 2008	Taipei, Taiwan	National Taiwan University Sports Center	Dee Hsu, Barbie Hsu, A-Mei, Claire Kuo, Lollipop
November 22, 2008	Taichung, Taiwan	National Chung Hsing University	Angela Chang, Claire Kuo, Hey Girl, Janet Hsieh
August 19, 2009	Hong Kong, China	Kowloonbay International Trade & Exhibition Centre	Lollipop, Claire Kuo
August 21, 2009	Beijing, China	Beijing Exhibition Center	Claire Kuo

=== Love & FanFan world tour ===
Date	Location	Venue	Special guests
August 27, 2011	Shanghai, China	Mercedes-Benz Arena	Ella Chen
September 9, 2011	Beijing, China	Workers Indoor Arena	Stefanie Sun, Wu Tsing-fong
December 25, 2011	Suzhou, China	Suzhou Sports Center	Claire Kuo
May 12, 2012	Guangzhou, China	Guangzhou Gymnasium	JPM
June 30, 2012	Chengdu, China	Sichuan Gymnasium	Blackie Chen
August 18, 2012	Shanghai, China	Mercedes-Benz Arena	Blackie Chen
October 27, 2012	Nanjing, China	Nanjing Olympic Sports Centre	Blackie Chen
January 13, 2013	Hong Kong, China	Hong Kong Coliseum	Will Pan
February 2, 2013	Taipei, Taiwan	Taipei Arena	Leehom Wang
March 25, 2013	London, UK	The O2 Arena	
June 16, 2013	Connecticut, U.S.	Mohegan Sun Arena	
October 12, 2013	Vancouver, Canada	Queen Elizabeth Theatre	William Wei

=== My Dear Life Concert ===
Date	Location	Venue	Special guests
March 18, 2014	Taipei, Taiwan	Lagacy Taipei	

=== On the Road to Happiness world tour ===
Date	Location	Venue	Special guests
March 18, 2017	Shenzhen, China	Shenzhen Bay Sports Centre	
May 20, 2017	Beijing, China	Capital Indoor Stadium	
July 15, 2017	Jinan, China	Jinan Olympic Sports Center Gymnasium	
September 2, 2017	Shanghai, China	Mercedes-Benz Arena	
October 20, 2017	Boston, U.S.	Orpheum Theatre	
October 23, 2017	Vancouver, Canada	Queen Elizabeth Theatre	
November 4, 2017	Taipei, Taiwan	Taipei Arena	
December 9, 2017	Wuhan, China	Wuhan Sports Center	
December 23, 2017	Zhengzhou, China	Zhengzhou International Convention and Exhibition Center	
January 26, 2018	Los Angeles, U.S.	Pasadena Convention Center	
January 28, 2018	San Jose, U.S.	San Jose Center for the Performing Arts	
January 30, 2018	Toronto, Canada	Massey Hall	
November 16, 2019	Singapore, Singapore	Singapore Indoor Stadium	
