= Vox Nativa =

Taiwanese non-profit organization

- 台灣原聲教育協會
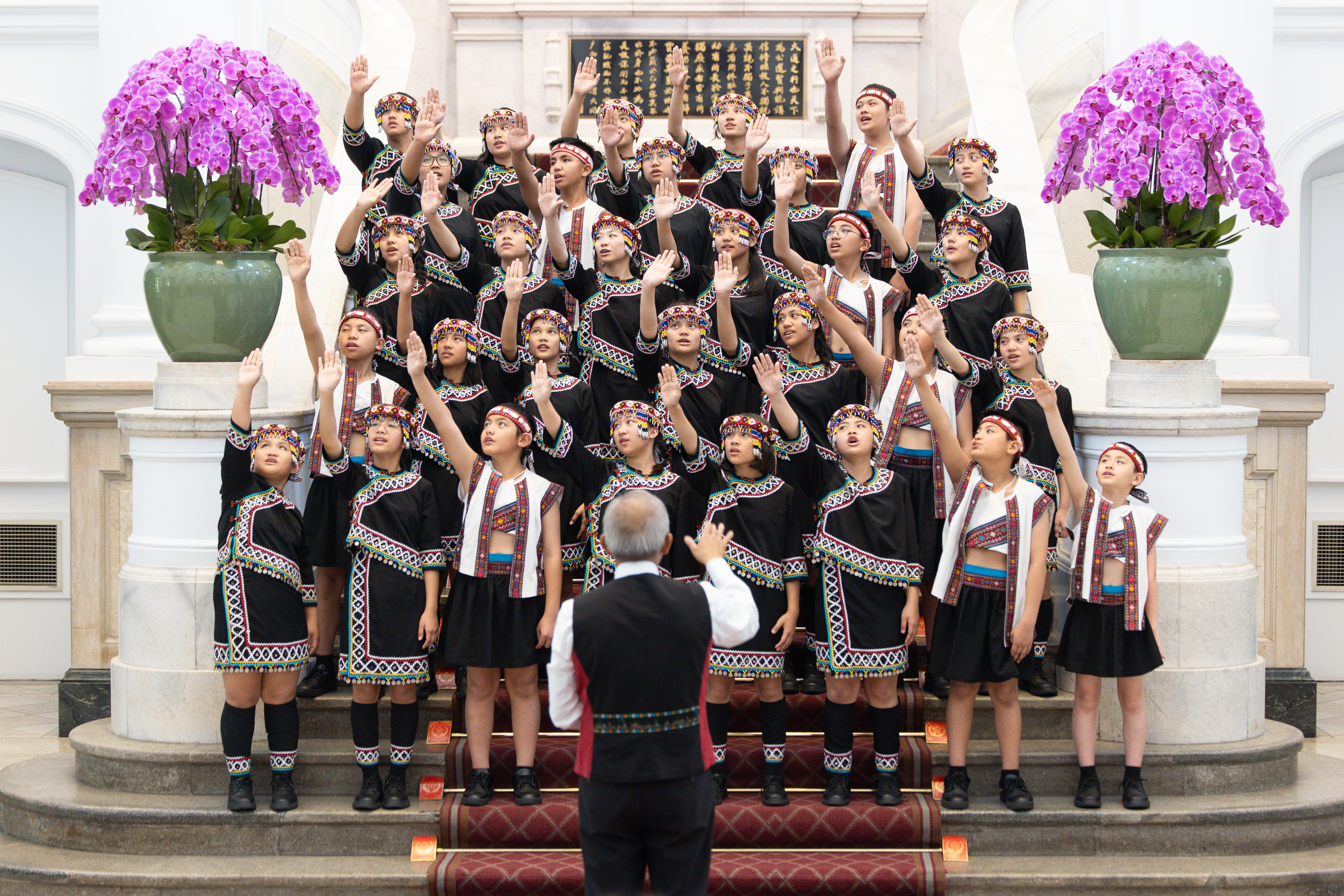
- Vox Nativa Choir Taiwan in 2025
- Location: Taiwan

Vox Nativa (Chinese: 台灣原聲教育協會) is a Taiwanese nonprofit organization focused on promoting aboriginal music and culture. Established in Nantou County, Taiwan, the organization formed a children's choir and music school in 2008.

== History ==
Vox Nativa began as a project started by two Nantou County educators. Sinyi Elementary School principal Bukut Tasualuam and retired teacher Liao A-kuan set out to provide music education to the aboriginal youth.

In 2010, the organization hosted a summer camp for children in elementary school, with both music activities and English, science, and math classes. The campers hailed from 11 tribal villages and 17 elementary schools.

In August 2018, the organization established an experimental high school in New Taipei.

== Children's Choir ==
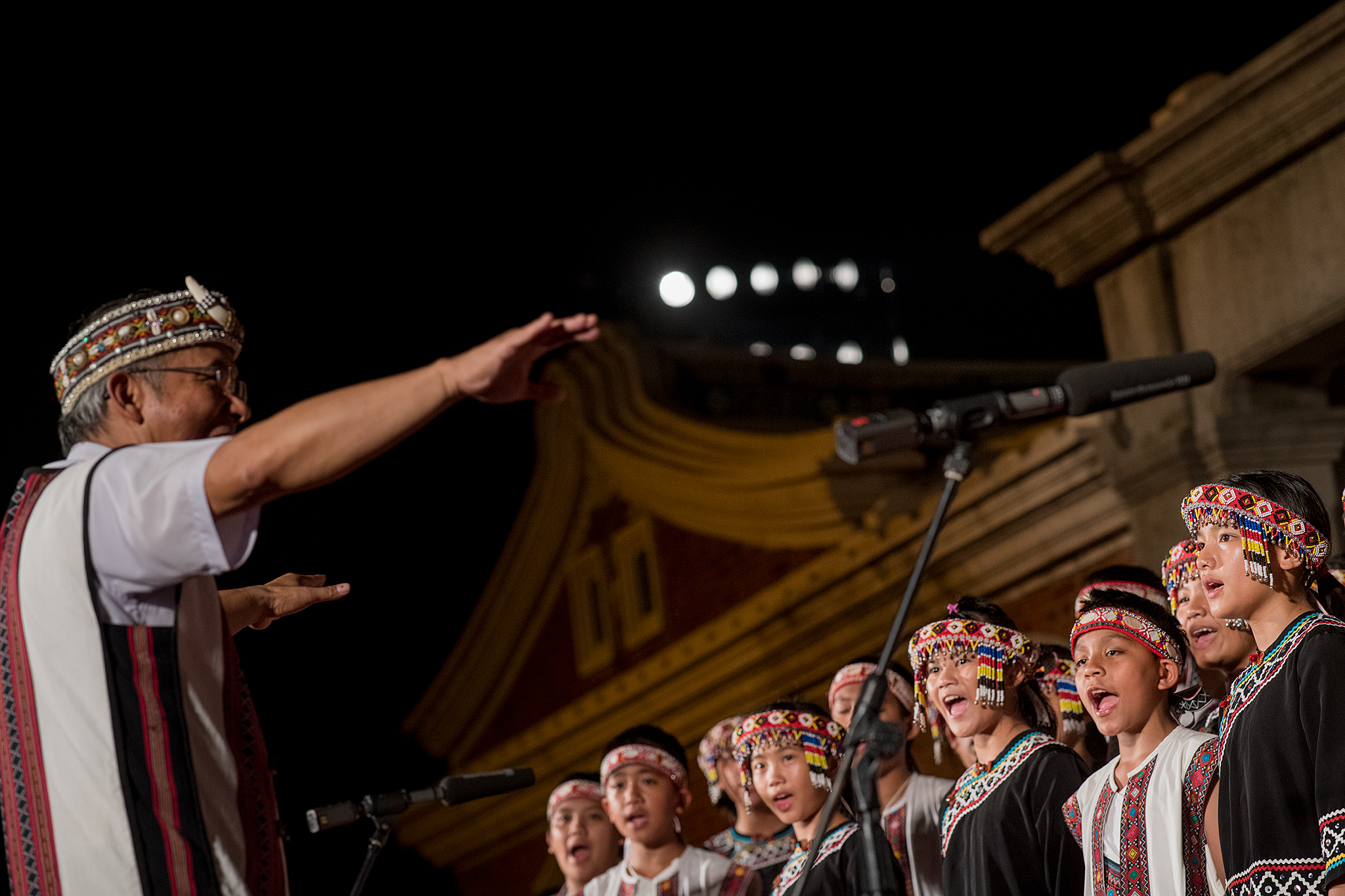
Vox Nativa Children's Choir in 2017

The Vox Nativa Children's Choir is headed by Bukut Tasvaluan.

=== Touring and recognition ===
The Vox Nativa choir toured Europe in 2015, and again in 2025. During their 2025 Europe tour, the choir performed with the Sistine Chapel Children's Choir at the Sant'Agnese in Agone, Rome. The choir has also toured in the United States.

The choir's 2009 album, Sing It! , "won the special jury prize at the 20th Golden Melody Awards".

== Albums ==
- Sing It! (2009)

== In media ==
The organization inspired a 2021 drama film, Listen Before You Sing (聽見歌再唱), and a 2023 documentary, titled Kulumaha: Behind the Singing. A performance from the choir of "Kipahpah Ima" ("Let's Clap Together") was also included in the documentary Beyond Beauty: Taiwan from Above.
