= Jam Hsiao =

Taiwanese singer and actor (born 1987)

Jam Hsiao Ching-teng
- 蕭敬騰
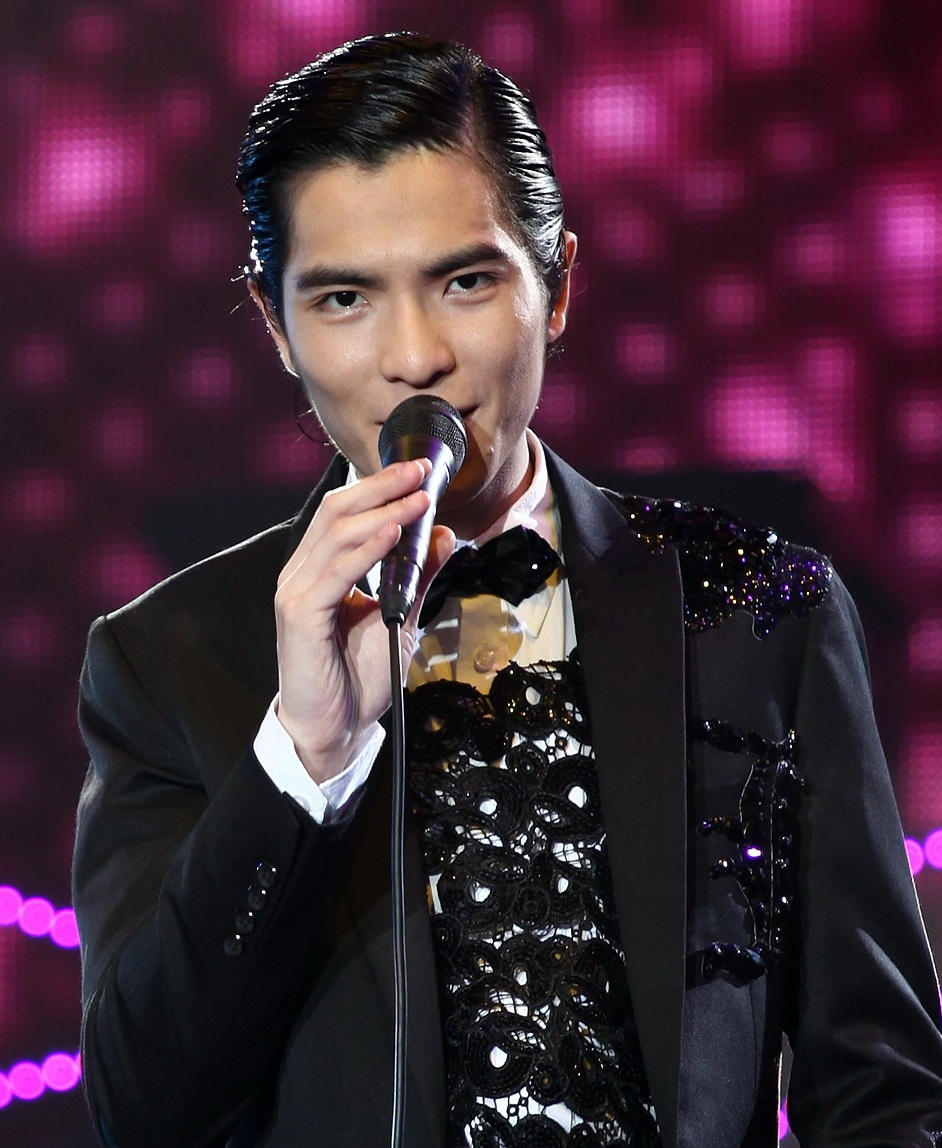
- Hsiao in 2012
- Born: 30 March 1987 (age 39); Hualien, Taiwan
- Occupations: Singer-songwriter, actor, judge
- Years active: 2007–present
- Spouse: Summer Lin (m. 2023)
- Awards: Hong Kong Film Awards – Best New Performer; 2012 The Killer Who Never Kills Golden Melody Awards – Best Mandarin Male Singer; 2013: It's All About Love MTV Asia Awards – Hong Kong-Taiwan Region Most Potential Male Vocal of the Year; 2008 CCTV-MTV Music Ceremony

Chinese name
- Traditional Chinese: 蕭敬騰
- Simplified Chinese: 萧敬腾
Transcriptions
Standard Mandarin
- Hanyu Pinyin: Xiāo Jìngténg
- Wade–Giles: Hsiao^{1} Ching^{4}-t'eng^{2}
Southern Min
- Hokkien POJ: Siau Kèng-thêng
- Musical career
- Genre: Mandopop
- Instruments: Piano, keyboards, guitar, drums, saxophone, flute
- Label: Warner Music Taiwan (2008–present)

Jam Hsiao Ching-teng (simplified Chinese: 萧敬腾; traditional Chinese: 蕭敬騰; pinyin: Xiāo Jìngténg; Pe̍h-ōe-jī: Siau Kèng-thêng, born 30 March 1987) is a Taiwanese singer and actor. At the age of 17, while still in high school, he began working as a restaurant singer. In May 2007, Hsiao took part in the first season of China Television (CTV)'s star search show, One Million Star. He signed a contract with Warner Music Taiwan in 2008 and released his debut album, Jam Hsiao, in the same year.

In 2011, Hsiao played the lead role in the action film The Killer Who Never Kills and won the Hong Kong Film Award for Best New Performer for his performance. In 2013, his fourth album It's All About Love won him Best Male Vocalist at 24th Golden Melody Awards.

In 2015, he formed a four-man band called Lion as singer-songwriter and keyboarder of the band, and they participated in Singer 2017 and got third. Hsiao later returned three years later on Singer 2020 as a solo singer, where he also finished third.

== Singing career ==
=== 2007: Rise to fame ===
In May 2007, Hsiao was accepted to the first season of a TV show, One Million Star 超级星光大道. This show was the Taiwanese equivalent of American Idol. The show's production unit recognized his talent and wanted him to appear as a challenger in the already unraveling first season. Hsiao was arranged to be in a player knockout(PK) style singing match against the show's 10 best remaining contestants. He won the first two rounds. Although he lost in the third round, the show's rating shot up to a historical high. He became the third most searched celebrity in Yahoo! Taiwan, and his name the second hottest keyword for Taiwan Show Business in Google.

His brief appearance on the show captured the attention of the music industry at that time and the restaurant he was singing at was full house whenever there was his shift. Even though at this time he was not signed with any music record company, Hsiao received many invitation to go on variety shows.

Hsiao's powerful vocal and sudden popularity got A-Mei 張惠妹's attention. A-Mei is known as Taiwan's Queen of Pop and she invited Hsiao to sing with her in the duet "Moment of the First Sight" (一眼瞬間) in her 2007 music album Star. It became the instant No. 1 hit. In December 2007, Hsiao performed a medley of four nominated original themes in the Golden Horse Award, the most significant event for film industry in Taiwan. At this time, Hsiao was still an ordinary 20-year-old student and freelance musician. Needless to say, many record companies fought to recruit this young and fresh talent.

=== 2008: Self-titled album ===
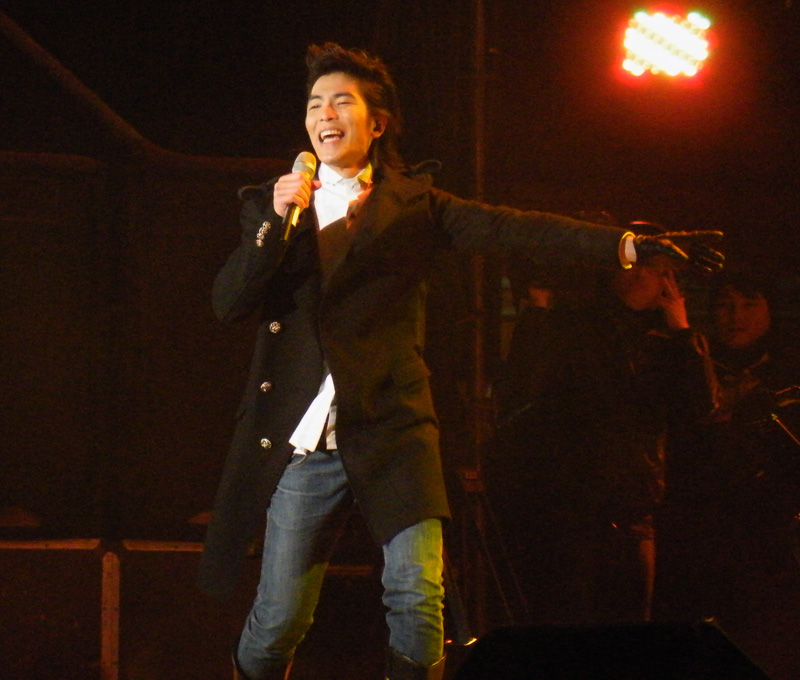
Jam Hsiao at Taipei New Year's Eve Party 2011

In March 2008, Warner Music Taiwan and Hsiao entered a four-year contract. His first album, the self-titled Jam Hsiao 同名专辑, debuted in June 2008. It was the No.1 hit on the billboard for 7 weeks. In July 2008, Hsiao's New-song Premiere Concert at Taipei Danshui Fisherman's Wharf Attracted over ten thousand fans. This album was also the No.1 hit in Singapore, Hong Kong, and Malaysia. In June 2009, he was nominated as the Best New Singer in the 20th Golden Music Awards in Taiwan. Although he did not win the title, his extraordinary performance had won him a solid position in Taiwan music industry.

During this period, Jam Hsiao also tried acting. He had a cameo in the popular Taiwanese drama "Fated To Love You／ 命中注定我爱你" and received many positive reviews. Jam Hsiao visited Italy in December 2008. Inspired by this visit, he published a book, "Listening to Italy" and wrote a song "To My Beloved". This song was released as an EP with video to raise funds for the Genesis Social Welfare Foundation.

=== 2009: Princess, Love Moments ===
Following the success of his first album, Hsiao's second album Princess was released in July 2009 with even greater success. The title rock song "Princess" was a No.1 hit for three months. This 12-song album included four songs written by Hsiao and had the chance to become the song producer for these tracks. These four songs showcased his creativity, and each one of them had its own distinguished style. He then announced his first large-scale live concert, "Mr. Rock Concert", in Taipei Arena scheduled in December 2009.

As part of his pre-concert initiative, Hsiao released in November 2009 his third album, Love Moments. This album included 10 covers of songs originally sung by top female singers. Hsiao recorded them in a live-band style. Among them, "Silent Flower" was in Taiwanese dialect, and the album's first hit song "New Endless Love" was the song he sang and got defeated on TV show, One Million Star in 2007.

Hsiao's two albums in 2009 gave him five more No.1 hits. He had six songs in top 100 on KKBOX Digital Music Billboard, and five songs in top 100 Golden Songs of 2009 on Hit FM Radio. He won the Best Male Singer Award in the 15th Singapore Golden Music Awards. In 2010, he was nominated as Best Male Singer in the Taiwan Golden Melody Music Awards.

=== 2009–2011: "Mr. Rock Concert Tour", Jam Wild Dreams ===
Jam Hsiao's Mr. Rock Concert at Taipei Arena in December 2009, was a huge success. It was sold out within minutes. The stage set was designed to mimic a chess game. In lavish costumes, he performed songs in Mandarin, Cantonese, Taiwanese, English and Korean. He also incorporated his drumming and keyboard skills on stage. Without dancers or guest singers, Hsiao single-handedly completed his first large-scale concert and earned enthusiastic praise. He toured four more cities— Singapore, Beijing, Kuala Lumpur, and Shanghai – till February 2011. He tailored each concert to the local market demands and incorporated different local elements in each of the different concert locations which was highly appreciated by fans.

Jam Hsiao released his fourth record album Jam Wild Dreams in June 2011. He was involved in selecting, composing, recording, mixing and background harmony production. He had been the individual song producer since his 2009 "Princess" album but this time round, he got to take on the role of album producer, a first for Hsiao. He was quoted saying that this album represented his music ideologies and beliefs and that this album is the most live studio recorded album as he strive to preserve the energy and appeal of an actual live performance. This album received very good reviews and was the rank number one album on Taiwan's KKBOX Music Rank. This album also won him the Best Male Singer in Singapore 17th Golden Melody Awards. It became the 11th best-selling album of 2011 in Taiwan, with 50,000 copies sold.

In the beginning of 2011, Hsiao was voted as one of the most desirable singers by the audience in China, and was invited to perform in a trio with Li Jian and Khalil Fong on CCTV New Year's Gala. This is a five-hour variety show on Chinese New Year's Eve and it has become an ingrained tradition in most Chinese families. Therefore, it is a great honor to appear on this show. However, Hsiao fell ill with influenza and laryngitis just days before the event. He managed to run through the rehearsals but his condition worsened. On the night of the show, he could hardly speak. As a performer, Hsiao knew that he had to fulfill his commitment. As one of the trio members, he also realized that this could be once-in-a-life-time opportunity for his two partners. Therefore, he did not cancel the appearance and refused to do a lip-sync. His only explanation after the show was "I did my best". Although his performance was a disappointment, his attitude, courage and professionalism earned the respect of the production unit, the fellow musicians and the hearts of the audience. After the New year, his saga became a hot topic of discussion, and his popularity soared in China. This episode led to a new phrase called "There's a spirit called Jam Hsiao", which goes to show the vast recognition he had received from the public.

=== 2011–2012: "Jam Hsiao World Concert Tour", Mr. Jazz: A Song For You, It's All About Love ===
Jam Hsiao's second production of concert tour started from Hong Kong in August 2011. It was going to have only one concert in Hong Kong. However, this show was sold out in a matter of minutes. Many fans failed to get tickets and were very disappointed. Then a second show was added and it was also sold out in 6 minutes.

The tour went to Shanghai in December 2011, Singapore in January 2012, and then headed for Taipei Arena in February 2012. In Taipei, the same scenario played out. The second show was added and sold out after the first show was sold out in one afternoon.

He received many more invitations to bring this concert tour to different cities including many cities in China, Sydney and Melbourne in Australia.

In 2012, Hsiao released his first full English album, consisting of eleven covers of known classics—such as "How Deep Is Your Love" by the Bee Gees and "L-O-V-E" by Nat King Cole—recorded from his Mr. Jazz Private Party Live. With the album, Hsiao showcased a 180-degree change in style and performance manner—from the powerful Mr. Rock to the soothing Mr. Jazz.

In an era where mainstream music dominates the charts, Hsiao aims to introduce less popular music towards the Asian market. Announcing on several radio shows that he wishes more and more people to be exposed to music that they don't usually approach.

In November 2012, Hsiao released another Chinese album, It's All About Love. This time, in addition to album producing, songwriting, singing, background vocal arrangement/singing, he also directed an MV for the song "Marry Me". He also recorded for the first time, a disco dance rap song, "Hey, Brother", and performed dance movement in the music video.

In July 2013, he won for Best Male Singer in the Taiwan Golden Melody Awards.

=== 2013–2014, Appearance on Duets, The Song ===
In 2013, Hsiao assumed the role of a mentor in Beijing Television, BTV's singing competition reality show Duets alongside another three mentors. One of his students, Xiao Yi Hang won first place after three months of competition and was subsequently signed with his record label company, Warner Music Ltd. He reprised his role as a mentor on the Season 2 of Duets.

In June 2014, Hsiao released his sixth album, The Song. He composed six out of ten songs in this album and was also the album producer. He specially engaged a dance instructor from Korea to choreograph his dance for the song "Kiss Me" and was reported to have learned it via a video recording in just two days. The song "Kelly" was chosen as the end track for the Korean drama "You Who Came From The Stars" which was aired in Taiwan in May. "The Song" was also selected to be the closing song for thirteen Shin Kong Mitsukoshi malls in Taiwan, which will be played just before the malls close starting on 1 July. In conjunction with the 2014 Brazil World Cup, Jam Hsiao became the World Cup Ambassador for Taiwan and his song "Let Go" was also featured as the closing song during the World Cup telecast in Taiwan.

=== 2016–present: Sound of My Dream, formation of Lion, and I Am a Singer appearance ===
In September 2016, Hsiao formed the band Lion, together with Lee Q Wu, Tsou Chiang and Liu Chao-chu. They released their self-titled album on 16 September. In the same year, he appeared as one of the mentors of Zhejiang Television's Sound of My Dream, together with Yu Quan, Hebe Tien, JJ Lin and A-Mei.

In 2017, Hsiao, together with his band Lion, participated in Singer 2017 and got third overall.

In 2020, he later returned in I Am a Singer's eighth season (also called Singer: Year of the Hits) this time as a solo singer, and finished third. Hsiao also doubled as a host for the first two episodes until he was replaced by his Music Partner Eliza Liang, after the show announced that subsequent episodes were to be taped remotely as part of the safety measures due to the coronavirus pandemic.

== Acting career ==
In 2010, Jam Hsiao joined the cast of a movie, The Killer Who Never Kills, based on a series of novels by popular Taiwanese novelist Giddens Ko. In the film, he plays the leading role, the titular Killer Who Never Kills, Ouyang Bonsai, and wrote the film's theme song. Released in 2011, the movie was a box office success, and he won the Best New Actor Award in the 31st Hong Kong Golden Film Awards in 2012.

Hsiao played the lead role of as the "Master of all Geeks" in his second film, romantic-comedy movie My Geeky Nerdy Buddies, directed by Kevin Chu alongside China artistes Jiang Shuying and Xie Na. It was released on 10 July 2014 in Mainland China and Taiwan.

== Personal life ==
In June 2023, Hsiao announced his engagement to his manager Summer Lin, whom he had secretly dated for 16 years. They married in October.

== Controversy ==
Since 2021, Hsiao has caused controversy in Taiwan for his pro-unification views. In January 2022, Hsiao, along with other two Taiwanese and two Chinese singers, took part in a pop song "We Sing the Same Song", which is interpreted to promote unification between China and Taiwan. The same month, during an interview about his performance of a song, "The Yellow River, The Yangtze River", on CCTV’s Spring Festival Gala, Hsiao said: "I believe that there are many friends in Taiwan who miss their hometown very much, so when you hear this song, if you have the opportunity, you must come back to your home to take a look."

== Discography ==
=== Studio albums ===
Title	Album details	Peak chart positions	Track listing
Title	Album details	TWN	Track listing
Jam Hsiao 蕭敬騰同名專輯	Released: 16 June 2008; Label: Warner Music Taiwan; Formats: CD, digital download	1	Track listing: 1. 收藏; 2. 王子的新衣; 3. 原諒我; 4. 奮不顧身; 5. 疼愛; 6. 多希望你在; 7. 活著; 8. 一輩子存在; 9. 我在哭; 10. Blues; 11. 海芋戀
Princess 王妃	Released: 17 July 2009; Label: Warner Music Taiwan; Formats: CD, digital download	1	Track listing: 1. 王妃; 2. 我不會愛; 3. 阿飛的小蝴蝶; 4. 善男信女; 5. Say a lil something 6. 愛遊戲; 7. 小男人大男孩; 8. 會痛的石頭; 9. 愛過了頭; 10. Green Door; 11. 給愛人; 12. 寂寞還是你
Love Moments 愛的時刻 自選輯	Released: 13 November 2009; Label: Warner Music Taiwan; Formats: CD, digital download	1	Track listing: 1. 開到荼蘼; 2. 新不了情; 3. 如果沒有你; 4. 夢一場; 5. 無言花; 6. 我懷念的; 7. 記念; 8. 寫一首歌; 9. 記得; 10. 倒帶
Jam Wild Dreams 狂想曲	Released: 30 June 2011; Label: Warner Music Taiwan; Formats: CD, digital download	1	Track listing: 1. 你 You; 2. 複製人 Clone; 3. 狂想曲 Wild Dreams; 4. 只能想念你 Miss you forever 5. 話不多 Quiet; 6. 怎麼說我不愛你 How to say I don't love you 7. 不停有意外的世界 The Unexpectable World; 8. 敷衍 Perfunctoriness; 9. 信仰 Faith; 10. 好想對你說 (悲傷版) I really want to say (sad version); 11. 好想對你說 I really want to say 12. 白蛇傳 Tale of the White Snake; 13. 茉莉戀 Jasmine Love; 14. 看對眼 Love at the first sight
Mr.Jazz – A Song for You	Released: 9 May 2012; Label: Warner Music Taiwan; Formats: CD, digital download	3	Track listing: 1. For Once in My Life/Stevie Wonder; 2. (I Love You) For Sentimental Reasons/Nat King Cole; 3. How Can You Mend a Broken Heart/Bee Gees; 4. How Deep is Your Love/Bee Gees（首波主打）; 5. Fever/Elvis Presley; 6. Save the Last Dance for Me/Michael Buble; 7. Rhythm of the Rain/The Cascades; 8. Sorry Seems to Be the Hardest Word/Elton John; 9. Put Your Head on My Shoulder/Paul Anka; 10. L-O-V-E/Nat King Cole; 11. A Song For You/Leon Russell
It's All About Love 以愛之名	Released: 30 November 2012; Label: Warner Music Taiwan; Formats: CD, digital download	2	Track listing: 1. 福爾摩斯（Holmes）; 2. 爸爸（PaPa）; 3. Marry Me; 4. 不正常（Unusual）; 5. 活在故事裡（Story）; 6. 以愛之名（It's all about LOVE）; 7. 如果（If）; 8. 兄弟我說（Hey, Brother!）; 9. 練習曲（Practice）; 10. 純金打造（Golden Love）; 11. 你知道嗎（Do You Know?）
The Song	Released: 27 June 2014; Label: Warner Music Taiwan; Formats: CD, digital download	1	Track listing: 1. 吻我吧（Kiss Me）; 2. 我就是愛你（Love Me, Please）; 3. 放開（Let Go）; 4. 鈴鈴(& 范瑋琪)（Ring Ring）; 5. 說（Say It）; 6. 色（Color）; 7. 我在飛（I'm Flying）; 8. 跟我玩（Play With Me）; 9. Kelly; 10. 這首歌（The Song）; 11. 這首歌（演奏版）（The Song（instrumental））; 12. 到不了的地方（Anywhere, Somewhere, Nowhere）
Reminiscence	Released: 31 December 2015; Label: Warner Music Taiwan; Formats: CD, digital download	—	Track listing: 1. 千言萬語; 2. 被遺忘的時光; 3. 袖手旁觀; 4. 矜持; 5. 張三的歌; 6. 一次幸福的機會; 7. 親密愛人; 8. 想你的人沒有睡; 9. 愛的箴言; 10. 城裡的月光
Reflection of Desire	Released: 22 June 2018; Label: Warner Music Taiwan; Formats: CD, digital download	—	Track listing: 1. 皮囊; 2. 王妃 2.0; 3. 讓我為你唱情歌; 4. 你會在哪呢; 5. 全是愛; 6. 欲望反光; 7. 迷茫世代; 8. 發現; 9. 與海鷗交談; 10. 我有多麼喜歡你 featuring Yoga Lin; 11. 我有多麼喜歡你

=== Singles and EPs ===
Year	Song / EP	Notes
2007	Moment of the First Sight	Duet with A-Mei, also in A-Mei's album "STAR"
2007	How We Roll	The theme song of "Alvin and the Chipmunks" Chinese version
2008	Lonesome or You	Gift by HTC cell phone, also in album "Princess"
2008	To My Beloved	Fund-raiser for Genesis Social Welfare Foundation released as EP/AVCD, also in album "Princess"
2009	Wish You Happiness	Commercial single for Farglory Realty, also in Chinese edition of album "Love Moment"
2009	Where Peace Begins	Theme song of World Peace Conference, Chinese version
2012	Sad Love	Included in the digital EP of stage play "The Demi-gods and Semi-devil"
2012	Promise You	Included in the digital EP of stage play "The Demi-gods and Semi-devil"
2012	Sixth Sense	Theme song of movie "Shadows of Love"
2014	Iceman	Theme song of movie "Iceman 3D"
2020	Hello	Duet with JJ Lin
2020	Dance Monkey	Chinese edition of Dance Monkey by Tones and I

=== DVDs ===
Year	Name	Label	Comment
2010	Mr. Rock Concert – Live	Warner Music Taiwan	Concert at Taipei Arena, December 2009
2012	Jam's World Concert Tour – Live	Warner Music Taiwan	Concert at Hong Kong Coliseum, August 2011
2013	Jam's World Concert Tour – Live	Warner Music Taiwan	Concert at Taipei Arena, Feb. 2012

== Filmography ==
=== Film ===
Year	English title	Mandarin title	Role	Notes
2011	The Killer Who Never Kills	殺手‧歐陽盆栽	Ouyang Bonsai	
2011	My Classmate Is the Boss	我的同學是老大—霸凌終結篇	Himself	
2012	Pursuit of the Only	追尋唯一	Singer A-teng	
2013	Escape from Planet Earth	地球人壞壞	Scorch Supernova	Mainland Chinese and Taiwanese release, voice
2014	My Geeky Nerdy Buddies	大宅們	A-chai	
2015	Crazy New Year's Eve	一路驚喜	Hsiao Ching-ming	
2018	The Faces of My Gene	祖宗十九代	Gonggong	

=== Television series ===
Year	English title	Mandarin title	Role	Notes
2008	Fated to Love You	命中注定我愛你	A veterinarian	Cameo, episode 18
2009	Momo Love	桃花小妹	A movie star	Cameo, episode 8
2017	Midnight Food Store	深夜食堂	Leon	Cameo
2019	Green Door	魂困西门	Wei Song Yan	Lead

=== Reality shows ===
Year	Title	Chinese title	Note	Ref.
2019	Super Penguin League; Season:2	超级企鹅联盟 Super3	Player; Live Basketball Competition	

== Awards and nominations ==
Year	Award	Category	Nominated work	Result	Ref.
2009	20th Golden Melody Awards	Best New Artist	Jam Hsiao	Nominated	
2009	HITO Radio Music Awards; HITO流行音樂獎	Top 10 Songs of the Year	"收藏" (Collection) from Jam Hsiao	Won	
2009	HITO Radio Music Awards; HITO流行音樂獎	Best New Artist	Jam Hsiao	Won	
2010	Metro Radio Mandarin Music Awards	Songs of the Year	"Say a lil Something"	Won	
2010	Metro Radio Mandarin Music Awards	Songs of the Year	"新不了情" ("New Endless Love")	Won	
2010	Metro Radio Mandarin Music Awards	Male Singer	—N/a	Won	
2010	Metro Radio Mandarin Music Awards	Asia Popular Idol (亞洲人氣偶像)	—N/a	Won	
2010	21st Golden Melody Awards	Best Male Vocalist – Mandarin	Princess	Nominated	
2012	23rd Golden Melody Awards	Best Male Vocalist – Mandarin	Jam Wild Dreams	Nominated	
2012	31st Hong Kong Film Awards	Best New Performer	The Killer Who Never Kills	Won	
2012	11th CCTV-MTV Awards	Best Male Singer (HK, Macau, Taiwan regions)	—N/a	Won	
2013	24th Golden Melody Awards	Best Male Vocalist – Mandarin	It's All About Love	Won	
