= Rice Field (song) =

- Rock remix cover

Single by Jay Chou

from the album Capricorn
- Released: September 22, 2008
- Recorded: 2008
- Genre: Pop
- Length: 3:43
- Label: JVR Music
- Songwriter(s): Jay Chou
- Producer(s): Jay Chou

Jay Chou singles chronology
"A Dandelion's Promise" (2007)	"Rice Field" (2008)	"The Promised Love" (2008)

Music video
- "Rice Field" on YouTube

"Rice Field" (Chinese: 稻香; pinyin: Dào xiāng; lit. 'Rice Fragrance') is a song by Taiwanese recording artist Jay Chou. It premiered in Asia on September 22, 2008, serving as the lead single for the singer's ninth studio album Capricorn (2008). Written and produced by Chou, "Rice Field" was conceived based on the singer's childhood memories. It is a pop number that blends elements of folk music and hip-hop, with lyrics looking back towards a more simple life amidst contemporary hardships.

"Rice Field" received positive reviews from music critics, with NetEase complimenting the song's lyrics and composition. "Rice Field" appeared at number three on the Hit FM's top 100 singles of the year ranking, and won Song of the Year at the Golden Melody Awards and Beijing Pop Music Awards. Its accompanying music video is set in a rural area with ox carts, country lanes, and rice paddies while Chou donned folk attire. A rock remix of the song was released by JVR on July 2, 2024.

== Background and release ==
"Rice Field" premiered on radio stations in Taiwan and Asia on September 22, 2008.

== Development ==
"Rice Field"
"Rice Field" is a pop song that combines folk music and hip-hop elements.

"Rice Field" draws inspiration from Chou's childhood memories. It depicts contemporary urban city dwellers burdened by societal and life pressures, and their growing desire to retreat to a simpler, rural existence. Chou intended to illustrate an idyllic countryside setting, running barefoot through fields, stealing fruits, and carefree childhood play.

He elaborated on the message behind the song: "Do not give up so easily. Just like I've always said before, if your dream seems to be too far away, do not hesitate to redefine it. Success and fame are not the ultimate goals. Work towards your personal happiness, as that is the true essence of life." In a 2013 interview with Southern Weekly, Chou commented that the song was created to cheer people up amidst the 2008 Sichuan earthquake and the 2008 financial crisis.

== Reception ==
NetEase complimented the song's composition and Chou's songwriting on the track. On year-end charts in Taiwan, "Rice Field" was ranked at number 3 on the Hit FM Top 100 Singles of the Year chart in 2008.

== Music video ==
In order to bring out the essence of the concept behind "Rice Field" in the music video, Chou chose a rural courtyard house as the filming location to represent his childhood memories. The video tells the story of a middle-aged man, frustrated with work-related stress, venting his frustrations on his wife and children. He later retreats to his rural hometown, where the affectionate welcome from his mother and relatives offers him strength. The video features two individuals leisurely singing and playing music on an ox cart, although the cart is propelled by staff members, not an ox.

The video blends rural scenery with hip-hop elements. Chou, donned in folk attire, lip-syncs on ox carts, country lanes, and amidst rice paddies. The video was filmed in Xinwu Township, Zhongli District in Taoyuan. On the day of filming, over 30 actors were enlisted to portray individuals of various ages in the courtyard. Chou and Yang Ruidai played wooden box drums and guitars. The folk-style clothing he wore were from Thailand, acquired during an advertisement shoot.

== Accolades ==
Awards and nominations
Year	Award	Category	Result
2009	Beijing Pop Music Awards	Song of the Year	Won
2009	Golden Melody Awards	Song of the Year	Won
2009	Golden Melody Awards	Best Composer	Nominated
2009	Golden Melody Awards	Best Lyricist	Nominated

== Parodies ==
In November 2008, netizens adapted the lyrics of the song to "Meat Fragrance" to satirize the poor quality of the food at school cafeterias.

== Release history ==
Region	Date	Version	Format	Label	Ref.
Taiwan	September 22, 2008	Original	Radio airplay	JVR Music	
China	September 22, 2008	Original	Radio airplay	JVR Music	
Singapore	September 22, 2008	Original	Radio airplay	JVR Music	
Malaysia	September 22, 2008	Original	Radio airplay	JVR Music	
Hong Kong	September 22, 2008	Original	Radio airplay	JVR Music	
Various	July 2, 2024	Rock remix	Digital download; streaming	JVR Music	
