= Jam Hsiao (album) =

Jam Hsiao Self Titled Album
- Jam Hsiao Self Titled Album cover

Studio album 蕭敬騰同名專輯 by Jam Hsiao
- Released: 16 June 2008
- Genres: Mandopop, Chinese rock
- Language: Mandarin
- Label: Warner Music Taiwan

Jam Hsiao chronology
Jam Hsiao Self Titled Album (2008)	Princess (2009)

Alternative cover

Jam Hsiao Self Titled Album (Chinese: 蕭敬騰同名專輯) is Taiwanese Mandopop artist Jam Hsiao's (Chinese: 蕭敬騰) debut Mandarin solo studio album. It was released on 16 June 2008 by Warner Music Taiwan.

The album was available on pre-order, from 2 to 15 June 2008, and two more editions were released. Jam Hsiao Self Titled Album (First Live Limited Edition) (蕭敬騰同名專輯-First Live影音限定版 2CD+DVD) was released on 1 August 2008 with bonus CD and DVD containing live tracks and footage from Hsiao's New Songs Premiere Concert at Tamshui Fisherman's Wharf, Taipei, Taiwan on 6 July 2008. Jam Hsiao Self Titled Album (Ultimate Collectible Edition) (蕭敬騰同名專輯-終極收藏版 2CD+2DVD) was released on 26 September 2008 with an additional DVD with five music videos and behind-the-scene footages.

== Reception ==
The album debuted at number one on Taiwan's G-Music Top 20 Weekly Mandarin and Combo Charts, and Five Music Chart at week 24 (13 to 19 June 2008) with a percentage sales of 42.06%, 23.93% and 37.14% respectively.

The tracks "原諒我" (Forgive Me), "王子的新衣" (Prince's New Clothes) and "收藏" (Collection) are listed at number 9, 32 and 67 respectively on Hit Fm Taiwan's Hit Fm Annual Top 100 Singles Chart (Hit-Fm年度百首單曲) for 2008.

The track, "收藏" (Collection) won one of the Top 10 Songs of the Year and Hsiao was awarded Best New Artist for his work on this album at the 2009 HITO Radio Music Awards presented by Taiwanese radio station Hit FM. and also nominated for Best New Artist at the 20th Golden Melody Awards in 2009 for his work on this album.

== Track listing ==
NB. Title - Songwriter/ Composer/ Producer

1. "收藏" (Collection) - Chen Zhen Chuan / Lee Wei Song / Lee Wei Song, Lee Shih Shiong
2. "王子的新衣" (Prince's New Clothes) - Chen Zhen Chuan / Andreas Hemmeth, Linnea Handberg / Lee Shih Shiong
3. "原諒我" (Forgive Me) - F.I.R. 阿沁, 陳天佑, 吳易緯 / 阿沁 / Lee Wei Song
4. "奮不顧身" (Daring Regardless of Self) - York Wu / Gary Chaw / Ma Yü-fen
5. "疼愛" (Loving Dearly) - Mayday Ashin / Mayday Ashin / 陳偉
6. "多希望你在" (Wish You Were Here) - Sodagreen QingFeng / Sodagreen QingFeng / Ma Yü-fen
7. "活著" (Alive) - Cui Wei Kai / 小宇(宋念宇)/ 陳偉
8. "一輩子存在" (Existence For A Lifetime) - Chen Zhen Chuan / Jam Hsiao / Lee Wei Song
9. "我在哭" (I’m Crying) - York Wu / Lee Shih Shiong / Lee Shih Shiong
10. "Blues" - 陳偉, 林唯 / 陳偉 / 陳偉
11. "海芋戀" (Romance of Alocasia) - 十九筆 / Jam Hsiao / 陳偉

== Releases ==
Three editions were released by Warner Music Taiwan:

- 16 June 2008 - Jam Hsiao Self Titled Album (蕭敬騰同名專輯)
- 1 August 2008 - Jam Hsiao Self Titled Album (First Live Limited Edition) (蕭敬騰同名專輯-First Live影音限定版 2CD+DVD) with a bonus CD containing 13 live tracks and a DVD containing live footage of the same 13 tracks recorded at Hsiao's New Songs Premiere Concert at Tamshui Fisherman's Wharf, Taipei, Taiwan on 6 July 2008.

Live CD/DVD

1. "王子的新衣" (Prince's New Clothes)
2. "活著" (Alive)
3. "海芋戀" (Romance of Alocasia) - feat Vivian Hsu
4. "夠不夠" feat Khalil Fong
5. "Love Song" by Khalil Fong
6. "奮不顧身" (Daring Regardless of Self)
7. "一輩子存在" (Existence For A Lifetime)
8. "我在哭" (I’m Crying)
9. "Blues"
10. "疼愛" (Loving Dearly)
11. "原諒我" (Forgive Me)
12. "多希望你在" (Wish You Were Here)
13. "收藏" (Collection)
- 26 September 2008 - Jam Hsiao Self Titled Album (Ultimate Collectible Edition) (蕭敬騰同名專輯-終極收藏版 2CD+2DVD) containing the same bonus CD and DVD of the First Live MV Edition plus an additional DVD with five music videos and behind-the-scene footages.

Collectible DVD

1. "收藏" (Collection) MV
2. "王子的新" (Prince's New Clothes) MV
3. "原諒我" (Forgive Me) MV
4. "奮不奮身" (Daring Regardless of Self) MV
5. "Blues" (Vampire Hunter Version) MV
6. "收藏" (Collection) MV behind-the-scene
7. "王子的新衣" (Prince's New Clothes) MV behind-the-scene
8. "Blues" MV behind-the-scene
9. Work in progress footage
10. Internet press short film
11. Jam Hsiao "Thank You!!"

== Charts ==
Chart Name	Debut Position	Week# / Week Dates of Peak Position	Peak Position	Percentage of Album Sales at Peak
G-Music Mandarin Chart, Taiwan 風雲榜 (華語榜)	#1	#24 / 13–19 June 2008	#1	42.06%
G-Music Combo Chart, Taiwan 風雲榜 (綜合榜)	#1	#24 / 13–19 June 2008	#1	23.93%
Five Music Taiwan; 5大金榜	#1	#24 / 13–19 June 2008	#1	37.14%

Hit Fm Annual Top 100 Singles Chart - 2008
Track name	Position
"原諒我" (Forgive Me)	#9
"王子的新衣" (Prince's New Clothes)	#32
"收藏" (Collection)	#67
