= 24th Golden Melody Awards =

Taiwanese music awards ceremony in 2013

- Date: July 6, 2013 (Popular)
- Location: Taipei Arena, Taipei, Taiwan (Popular)
- Hosted by: Matilda Tao (Popular)

Television/radio coverage
- Network: SET Metro

The 24th Golden Melody Awards (Chinese: 第24屆金曲獎) ceremony for popular music category was held on July 6, 2013. The SET network broadcast the show live from the Taipei Arena in Taipei, Taiwan. The ceremony recognized the best recordings, compositions, and artists of the eligibility year, which runs from January 1, 2012 to December 31, 2012.

== Nominees and winners ==
Winners are highlighted in boldface.

=== Vocal category – Record label awards ===
==== Song of the Year ====
- **"The Great Artist" (from Muse) – Jolin Tsai**
  - "Retrospection" (from Eternity, Promise) – Kay Huang
  - "Wordless Song" (from Gaia) – Sandy Lam
  - "Coastline" (from Coastline) – Yonlon Chen
  - "Rose-colored" (from Games We Play) – Deserts Chang

==== Best Mandarin Album ====
- **Gaia – Sandy Lam**
  - Opus 12 – Jay Chou
  - Ghetto Superstar – MC HotDog
  - Back to Wonderland – Khalil Fong
  - Muse – Jolin Tsai

==== Best Taiwanese Album ====
- **Tainan – Hsieh Ming-yu**
  - The Ninth Album – New Formosa Band
  - 1st Album – Gigi Wu
  - Love – Sasha Lee
  - What's Happening? – Kou Chou Ching

==== Best Hakka Album ====
- **The Way Home – Dark White Collar**
  - Walking – Huang Zhen-xin
  - Antipodes – Tito Tang
  - Jazz, Tang Dynasty – Hsieh Yu-wei
  - Hold Your Hands – Grace Huang

==== Best Aboriginal Album ====
- **A Cappella – O-kai**
  - A Beautiful Prediction – Resres
  - Dalan – Sangpuy
  - Amis – Suming
  - Sun and Moon – Ado' Kaliting Pacidal
  - Calisi – Dakanow

==== Best Music Video ====
- **Muh Chen – "Cheers" (from Second Round (No Where Edition))**
  - Bill Chia – "Increase Power" (from Moment)
  - Bill Chia – "Wordless Song" (from Gaia)
  - Muh Chen – "Super Girl" (from Super Girl)
  - Ken Huang, Eric Chen – "O La La Hu Hu" (from Guitar)
  - Muh Chen – "The Great Artist" (from Muse)

=== Vocal category – Individual awards ===
==== Best Composition ====
- **Kay Huang – "Retrospection" (from Eternity, Promise)**
  - JerryC – "Captain S.V" (from Fiction)
  - Ellen Loo – "You're Nothing to Me" (from You Hide Silently)
  - Lee Tsz-hang – "Coastline" (from Coastline)

==== Best Lyrics ====
- **Deserts Chang – "Rose-colored" (from Games We Play)**
  - Ayugo Huang, Bobby Chen – "Is Diesel Oil" (from The Ninth Album)
  - Michael Li – "Alzheimer" (from Love, After All)
  - MC HotDog – "Ghetto Superstar" (from Ghetto Superstar)
  - Lee Tsz-hang – "Coastline" (from Coastline)
  - Deserts Chang – "Rose-colored" (from Games We Play)

==== Best Music Arrangement ====
- **Chang Shilei – "Gaia" (from Gaia)**
  - Baby Chung – "Milihuwan" (from Dalan)
  - Skot Suyama – "Runaway Mama" (from Fiction)
  - Jason Huang – "A Larger Cello" (from Opus 12)
  - Michele Weir – "Sakalima" (from A Cappella)

==== Producer of the Year, Album ====
- **Sandy Lam, Chang Shilei – Gaia**
  - Chen Zhu-hui – Dalan
  - Jay Chou – Opus 12
  - Baby Chung – Eternity, Promise
  - Lai Jia-ching, Tim Wang – A Cappella

==== Producer of the Year, Single ====
- **Luantan Ascent – "Different Friends" (from Unforgettable)**
  - Gideon Su – "I Can Believe" (from Miss Non-Rock)
  - Peng Hsueh-bin – "Love in Heart" (from Love in Heart)
  - Chris Hou, Winnie Hsin – "Soundless Love Song" (from Meet Happiness)

==== Best Mandarin Male Singer ====
- **Jam Hsiao**
  - Yoga Lin
  - Jay Chou
  - Xiao Yu
  - Khalil Fong

==== Best Taiwanese Male Singer ====
- **Hsieh Ming-yu**
  - Weng Li-you
  - Hsu Fu-kai
  - Shao Ta-lun
  - Wang Jun-jieh

==== Best Mandarin Female Singer ====
- **Sandy Lam**
  - Ellen Loo
  - G.E.M.
  - Jia Jia
  - Lala Hsu
  - Jolin Tsai

==== Best Taiwanese Female Singer ====
- **Sasha Lee**
  - Hanya Chang
  - Showlen Maya
  - Laney Wu
  - Gigi Wu
  - Jennie Hsieh

==== Best Hakka Singer ====
- **Tito Tang**
  - Huang Zhen-xin
  - Hsieh Yu-wei
  - Liu Jung-chang
  - Grace Huang

==== Best Aboriginal Singer ====
- **Sangpuy**
  - Resres
  - Suming
  - Ado Kaliting Pacidal
  - Dakanow

==== Best Band ====
- **Monkey Pilot**
  - Lie Gramophone
  - Io
  - Matzka
  - My Skin Against Your Skin

==== Best Group ====
- **O-kai**
  - Kat n Candi x 2
  - JS
  - Tom & Huck

==== Best New Artist ====
- **Miss Ko**
  - Amuyi Lu
  - Sangpuy
  - Ann Bai
  - Jia Jia
  - Eve Ai
  - O-kai

=== Instrumental category – Record label awards ===
==== Best Instrumental Album ====
- **Joyful Reunion Original Soundtrack – Baby Chung**
  - Flying Alone – Su Yuhan
  - 3 – Timeless Fusion Party
  - Love Without Boundaries – Children's Garden
  - On a Gentle Island Breeze – Daniel Ho

=== Instrumental category – Individual awards ===
==== Producer of the Year, Album ====
- **Daniel Ho – On a Gentle Island Breeze**
  - Lu Sheng-fei, Tung, Shuen-wen – 3
  - Sino Chen, Tao Wang – Love Without Boundaries
  - Tung Yun-chang – With You There's Always Sunshine
  - Baby Chung – Joyful Reunion: Original Motion Picture Soundtrack

==== Best Instrumental Composition ====
- **Sino Chen – "Waltz in Summer Palace" (from Love Without Boundaries)**
  - Su Yuhan – "Flying Alone" (from Flying Alone)
  - Lu Sheng-fei – "Love Lemonade" (from 3)
  - Baby Chung – "The Secret of the Master" (from Joyful Reunion: Original Motion Picture Soundtrack)
  - Daniel Ho – "On a Gentle Island Breeze" (from On a Gentle Island Breeze)

=== Technical category – Individual awards ===
==== Best Album Design ====
- **Xiao Qing-yang – Die Glocke der Kartenkirche**
  - Aaron Nieh – Hollywood Zoo
  - Tsai Jia-lun, Liao Jun-yu – Sea Food
  - Joe Fang – The Way Home
  - Xiao Qing-yang, Wang Wei-cheng, Huang Yao-ting, Lee Tsong-han – What's Happening?

=== Jury Award ===
- **O-kai**

=== Lifetime Contribution Award ===
- **Fong Fei-fei**
