= Capricorn (Jay Chou album) =

Studio album by Jay Chou
- Released: 14 October 2008
- Recorded: 2008
- Studio: JVR Studio (Taipei); Yang Dawei Studio (Taipei); Studio-One (Taipei); Again Studio (Taipei)
- Genre: Pop; R&B
- Length: 43:57
- Language: Mandarin
- Label: JVR; Sony BMG
- Producer: Jay Chou

Jay Chou chronology
2007 the World Tour (2008)	Capricorn (2008)	The Era (2010)

Singles from Capricorn
- 1. "Rice Field" Released: 22 September 2008; 2. "The Promised Love" Released: 14 October 2008; 3. "Give Me the Time of a Song" Released: 14 October 2008

Capricorn (Chinese: 魔杰座; pinyin: Mó jié zuò) is the ninth studio album by Taiwanese recording artist Jay Chou, released on 14 October 2008, by JVR Music and Sony BMG. The album's lyrical content was penned by Chou and his frequent collaborator Vincent Fang, alongside Alang Huang, Ku Hsiao-li, and Juang Ling-ja, whilst composition was handled by Chou himself. The title of the album serves as a homophone in Chinese meaning Capricorn as well as magic—the former of which is a nod to Chou's zodiac sign. Its production blend elements of pop, hip-hop, rock, and folk music.

Upon its release, Capricorn was subject to positive reviews music critics. It was met with commercial success in various regions in Asia, reaching number one on the G-Music chart in Taiwan and the Hong Kong Record Merchants Association (HKRMA) album chart in Hong Kong. It was the second best-selling record of 2008 in Taiwan, selling 152,000 copies, as well as the third best-selling record of the year in Hong Kong. In Singapore, the album was certified platinum by the Recording Industry Association Singapore (RIAS) in 2021.

Three singles were promoted for the album—"Rice Field", "The Promised Love", and "Give Me the Time of a Song". "Rice Field" won Song of the Year at both the Golden Melody Awards in Taiwan and the Beijing Pop Music Awards in China, while Chou won Best Mandarin Male Singer at the former award ceremony for the album.

== Background and development ==
The album's title is derived from a homophone meaning both magic and Capricorn in Chinese, the latter of which is Chou's astrological sign. The overarching theme of the album revolves around magic and playing card suits. The album's visuals consist of Chou embodying a knight on a playing card as well as a joker.

== Release ==
"Rice Field" premiered on radio stations in Taiwan on 22 September 2008. Similar to Chou's preceding albums such as November's Chopin and On the Run!, the tracks from Capricorn were prematurely leaked on various websites prior to the official release. Consequently, the record company decided to postpone the intended release date of Capricorn from 9 October to 14 October 2008.

== Composition and songs ==
"Do not give up so easily. Just like I've always said before, if your dream seems to be too far away, do not hesitate to redefine it. Success and fame are not the ultimate goals. Work towards your personal happiness, as that is the true essence of life."

—Chou on the message behind "Rice Field".

The album's tracks blend elements of hip-hop and folk music. The lead single, "Rice Field", draws inspiration from Chou's nostalgic childhood memories. It depicts the plight of contemporary city dwellers, burdened by societal and life pressures, and their growing desire to retreat to a simpler, rural existence. Chou intended to illustrate an idyllic countryside setting, running barefoot through fields, stealing fruits, and carefree childhood play. "The Promised Love" is an emotionally charged ballad that depicts pain associated with break up. It utilizes piano chords intertwined with instrumentals from the violin, cello, and drums.

On year-end charts in Taiwan, "Rice Field", "Give Me the Time of a Song", and "The Promised Love", were ranked at number 3, number 17, and number 56, respectively, on 2008's Hit FM Top 100 Singles of the Year chart.

== Music videos ==
The production of the music videos for "Magician" and “Uncle Jocker" involved over 15 dancers including dance troupes, jazz musicians, and stunt performers from various countries such as Russia. Behind-the-scenes footage of "The Promised Love" depicts Chou inviting actress Andrea Chen to star as the female lead. The music video for "Give Me the Time of a Song" featured actress Jenna Wang in the lead female role. In April 2008, Chou rented the presidential suite of the InterContinental Hotel in Hong Kong for the production of its music video. Additionally, a Pagani Zonda F, a high-performance sports car also known as "Ghost Son", was utilized for filming sequences in the city's historic streets.

In preparation for the "Snake Dance" music video, Chou underwent specialized training to perfect the dance moves. The video for "Dragon Knight" was set in a fantasy realm set a century into the future, in a world filled with bizarre creatures and mechanical behemoths locked in combat. Amidst the steel and concrete landscape, love remained the sole unchanging element. The video's artistic direction, cinematography, lighting design, sound effects, special effects, and post-production were all handled by Chou. The set utilized a circular clock, a grand hall, and an elongated corridor that fused the aesthetics of a city with classical Gothic architecture.

== Accolades ==
At the 20th Golden Melody Awards, the album was nominated for eight awards, winning Best mandarin Male Singer, Song of the Year for "Rice Field", and Best Music Video for "Magician".

Awards and nominations
Year	Award	Category	Nominated work	Result
2009	Golden Melody Awards	Best Mandarin Male Singer	Capricorn	Won
2009	Golden Melody Awards	Best Mandarin Album	Capricorn	Nominated
2009	Golden Melody Awards	Best Album Producer	Capricorn	Nominated
2009	Golden Melody Awards	Best Musical Arranger	Baby Chung for "Magician"	Nominated
2009	Golden Melody Awards	Best Music Video	"Magician"	Won

== Track listing ==
All music is composed by Jay Chou.

Capricorn – Standard edition
No.	Title	Lyrics	Length
1.	"Dragon Rider" (龍戰騎士; Lóng zhàn qíshì)	Vincent Fang	4:31
2.	"Give Me The Time of a Song" (給我一首歌的時間; Gěi wǒ yī shǒu gē de shíjiān)	Jay Chou	4:13
3.	"Snake Dance" (蛇舞; Shé wǔ; featuring Lara Veronin)	Alang Huang	2:54
4.	"Floral Sea" (花海; Huā hǎi)	Ku Hsiao-li, Huang Ling-jia	4:24
5.	"Magician" (魔術先生; Móshù xiānshēng)	Vincent Fang	3:47
6.	"The Promised Love" (說好的幸福呢; Shuō hǎo de xìngfú ne)	Vincent Fang	4:16
7.	"Lan-Ting-Xu" (蘭亭序)	Vincent Fang	4:13
8.	"Drifting Poet" (流浪詩人; Liúlàng shīrén; featuring Gary Yang)	Vincent Fang	2:49
9.	"Time Machine" (時光機; Shíguāng jī)	Vincent Fang	5:11
10.	"Uncle Joker" (喬克叔叔; Qiáo kè shūshu)	Alang Huang	4:16
11.	"Rice Field" (稻香; Dào xiāng)	Jay Chou	3:43
Total length:			43:57

Capricorn – DVD
No.	Title	Length
1.	"Rice Field" (稻香)
2.	"Give Me The Time of a Song" (給我一首歌的時間)

== Charts ==
=== Weekly charts ===
Chart (2008)	Peak position
Hong Kong Albums (HKRMA)	1
Taiwanese Albums (G-Music)	1

=== Year-end charts ===
Chart (2008)	Position
Hong Kong Albums (HKRMA)	3
Taiwanese Albums	2

== Certifications ==
Region	Certification	Certified units/sales
Singapore (RIAS)	Platinum	10,000^{*}
Taiwan	—	152,000
^{*} Sales figures based on certification alone.
