= Joanna Wang =

Taiwanese-American singer-songwriter (born 1988)

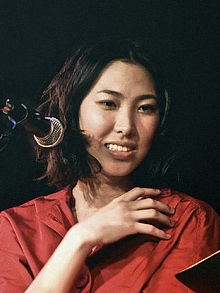
- Born: Wang Ruolin; 1 August 1988 (age 38); Taipei, Taiwan
- Occupation: Singer-songwriter
- Years active: 2008–present
- Parent: Bing Wang (father)
- Musical career
- Also known as: Joanna, New Tokyo Terror, Chicken Joanna, Alferd Packer, Poocat
- Genres: Folk, jazz, pop, video game music, alternative, geek rock
- Instruments: Vocals, guitar, piano, kazoo
- Label: Sony Music Taiwan

Chinese name
- Traditional Chinese: 王若琳
Transcriptions
Standard Mandarin
- Hanyu Pinyin: Wáng Ruòlín
- Website: www.sonymusic.com.tw/pop/joannawang

Joanna Wang (Chinese: 王若琳; pinyin: Wáng Ruòlín; born 1 August 1988), is a Taiwanese-American singer-songwriter, daughter of music producer Bing Wang (王治平). Born in Taipei but raised in Los Angeles, California, Wang dropped out of Gabrielino High School when she was 16. Her debut album, Start from Here, was released in January 2008 as a double-disc set, one in English and the other in Chinese. The album reached No. 1 in Taiwan and has been popular throughout Southeast Asia. In June 2008, it was released in Japan. Her second album, Joanna & Wang Ruo-lin, which includes her all-original endeavor The Adult Storybook, was released in January 2009.

== Career ==
As she was raised in the United States, Wang was exposed to many pop music acts, including The Beatles, Queen, and Oingo Boingo. Among her major influences are Danny Elfman, Yoeko Kurahashi, Paul McCartney, and video game music, most notably those from the Castlevania, Zelda, and Mario series. She has stated in her YouTube videos and in interviews that she dislikes her debut and rejects it as her own work.

Wang is a left-handed guitarist.

She has performed some of her own work and has covered various popular songs in English and in Chinese on Taiwanese television programs.

Starting in 2013, Wang began occasionally performing with a band under the name Alferd Packer & The Weird Uncles.

In March 2016, Wang performed in a production of the musical Turn Left, Turn Right, based on the illustrated book of the same name, sometimes known as A Chance of Sunshine in English.

Wang's rendition of "Pure Imagination" from her album Midnight Cinema was used for the Samsung Galaxy Fold product unveiling advertisement in February 2019.

Wang released her twelfth album, Hotel La Rut, in 2024, a concept album inspired by the Kids In The Hall sketch of the same name.

== Awards ==
- 2008: Singapore Hit Awards 2008 – Outstanding Newcomer
- 2008: 9th CCTV-MTV Music Awards – Most Popular New Female Artist of the Year in Hong Kong and Taiwan
- 2008: Metro Hits Music Awards – Metroshowbiz Hits Mandarin Songwriter Singer Big Award
- 2008: Metro Hits Music Awards – Metro Radio Hits Most Voted Newcomer Award
- 2008: China Mobile Wireless Music Awards – Most Potential New Female Singer
- 2008: 2008 Beijing Chinese Pop Music Awards – Best Composer-Singer Newcomer

== Discography ==
=== Original Albums ===
- The Adult Storybook (2009)
- The Adventures of Bernie the Schoolboy (2011)
- Galaxy Crisis: The Strangest Midnight Broadcast (2013)
- Bob Music (2015)
- House of Bullies (2016)
- Modern Tragedy (2018)
- Hotel La Rut (2024)

=== Cover Albums ===
- Start from Here (2008)
- Joanna & Wang Ruo-lin (2009)
- The Things We Do for Love (2011)
- Midnight Cinema (2014)
- Love is Calling Me (2019)

=== EP ===
- H.A.M. (Happy Accessible Music)(w/ Chinese Title: "火腿") (2016)

== Notes ==
- a. Quotation in Chinese: "有壓力的話我也寧可這樣，我想做自己想要的音樂。"
