= Perfect Life (Yoga Lin album) =

Studio album 美妙生活 by Yoga Lin
- Released: 6 May 2011
- Genre: Mandopop
- Language: Mandarin
- Label: HIM International Music

Yoga Lin chronology
Senses Around (2009)	Perfect Life (2011)	fiction (2012)

Perfect Life (Chinese: 美妙生活) is Taiwanese Mandopop artist Yoga Lin's third Mandarin studio album. It was released on 6 May 2011 by HIM International Music.

== Track listing ==
No.	Title	Lyrics	Music	Length
1.	"美妙生活 (Mei Miao Sheng Huo)" (The Wonderful Life)	Albert Leung	Roger Joseph Manning Jr.	3:27
2.	"自然醒 (Zi Ran Xing)" (Wake Up)	Wyman Wong	Subyub Lee	4:04
3.	"想自由 (Xiang Zi You)" (Freedom)	Daryl Yao	Zheng Nan	4:41
4.	"我總是一個人在練習一個人 (Wo Zong Shi Yi Ge Ren Zai Lian Xi Yi Ge Ren)" (I Always Practice Alone)	Francis Lee	Salsa Chen	3:03
5.	"紀念品 (Ji Nian Pin)" (A Souvenir)	Yuen Chen	Skot Suyama	4:20
6.	"不換 (Bu Huan)" (Going On My Way)	Lan Xiao Xie	Wang Hao	4:26
7.	"擁有 (Yong You)" (Possession)	Zhang Pengpeng, Shiren Cheng	Zheng Nan	3:52
8.	"早開的晚霞 (Zao Kai De Wan Xia)" (Early Sunset Clouds)	Kevin Yi, Yuen Chen	Yvonne Lee Sung	5:20
9.	"想念(Xiang Nian)" (I Miss You)	Derek Shih	Ye Huai Pei	4:18
10.	"晚安 (Wan An)" (Good Night)	Wu Xiong	Salsa Chen	4:18
11.	"Fly My Way"	Yuen Chen	Sasha Smith, Vivian Smith	3:39

== Music videos ==
1. Good Night (晚安) (22/04/2011)
2. Freedom (想自由) (01/05/2011)
3. Wake Up (自然醒) (19/05/2011)
4. I Always Practice Alone (我總是一個人在練習一個人) (29/06/2011)
5. The Wonderful Life (美妙生活) (12/07/2011)
