= Princess (Jam Hsiao album) =

- Princess cover

Studio album 王妃 by Jam Hsiao
- Released: 17 July 2009
- Genre: Mandopop
- Language: Mandarin
- Label: Warner Music Taiwan

Jam Hsiao chronology
Jam Hsiao Self Titled Album (2008)	Princess (2009)	Love Moments (2009)

Alternative cover

Princess (Chinese: 王妃) is Taiwanese Mandopop artist Jam Hsiao's (Chinese: 蕭敬騰) second Mandarin studio album. It was released on 17 July 2009 by Warner Music Taiwan. The album was available for pre-order, from 23 June 2009, as the Princess (First Press Limited Edition) (王妃 全球首日封榮耀限定款) which includes gifts and photobook. A further edition, Princess (Live Limited Edition) (王妃 Live 影音限定版 2CD+DVD) was released on 28 August 2009 with bonus CD and DVD containing live tracks and footage from Hsiao's Princess Live Concert Tour at Tainan, Taiwan.

The track "Say a lil something" is composed by label mate Khalil Fong and four tracks, "小男人大男孩" (Not A Boy, Not Yet A Man), "Green Door", "給愛人" (To My Beloved) and "寂寞還是你" (Lonesome for You) are composed by Hsiao. The music video for "我不會愛" (Don't Know How to Love) features Taiwanese actress Sandrine Pinna.

== Reception ==
The album debuted at number one on Taiwan's G-Music Top 20 Weekly Mandarin and Combo Charts at week 29, and Five Music Chart at week 30 with a percentage sales of 33.1%, 22.76% and 24.45% respectively.

The tracks "王妃" (Princess), "我不會愛" (Don't Know How to Love) and "阿飛的小蝴蝶" (A-Fei's Little Butterfly) are listed at number 2, 4 and 9 respectively on Hit Fm Taiwan's Hit Fm Annual Top 100 Singles Chart (Hit-Fm年度百首單曲) for 2009.

The track, "Say a lil something" won one of the Songs of the Year at the 2010 Metro Radio Mandarin Music Awards presented by Hong Kong radio station Metro Info. According to Taiwan's G-Music chart the album is the eighth best selling album in Taiwan in 2009.

== Track listing ==
NB. Title - Songwriter/ Composer/ Producer

1. "王妃" (Princess) - 陳鎮川 / Lee Shih Shiong / Lee Shih Shiong - 3’39”
2. "我不會愛" (Don't Know How to Love) - 鄔裕康/ Kim, Seok Jin / 李偉菘 - 4’05”
3. "阿飛的小蝴蝶" (A-Fei's Little Butterfly) - Adia (阿弟仔)/ Adia (阿弟仔)/ Adia (阿弟仔) - 4’13”
4. "善男信女" (Believers) - 陳鎮川/ Lee Wei Song/ Lee Wei Song - 4’28”
5. "Say a lil something" - 崔惟楷 / Khalil Fong / Lee Shih Shiong - 3’28”
6. "愛遊戲" (Love Games) - 陳鎮川 / 陳偉 / 陳偉 - 3’48”
7. "小男人大男孩" (Not A Boy, Not Yet A Man) - Jam Hsiao/ Jam Hsiao/ Jam Hsiao - 3’32”
8. "會痛的石頭" (Stone That Knows Pain) - Yáo Ruòlóng / Jeong Si Ro, Kang Eun Kyung/ Lee Shih Shiong - 4’46”
9. "愛過了頭" (Loving You Too Deeply) - 胡如虹/ Lee Wei Song/ Lee Wei Song - 4’24”
10. "Green Door" - Jam Hsiao/ Jam Hsiao/ Jam Hsiao - 3’15”

Bonus tracks

1. "給愛人" (To My Beloved) - 陳鎮川/ Jam Hsiao/ 鍾興民 黃韻玲 - 3’44”
2. "寂寞還是你" (Lonesome for You) - Jam Hsiao/ Jam Hsiao/ 馬奕強 - 3’39”

== Releases ==
Three editions were released by Warner Music Taiwan:

- 23 June 2009 - Pre-order Princess (First Press Limited Edition) (王妃 全球首日封榮耀限定款) - includes gifts and photobook.
- 17 July 2009 - Princess (王妃)
- 28 August 2009 - Princess (Live Limited Edition) (王妃 Live 影音限定版 2CD+DVD) - includes a bonus CD containing 10 live tracks and a DVD containing live footage of the same 10 tracks recorded at Hsiao's Princess Live Concert Tour at Tainan, Taiwan.

Live CD/DVD

1. "王妃" (Princess)
2. "善男信女" (Believers)
3. "愛過了頭" (Loving You Too Deeply)
4. "小男人大男孩" (Not A Boy, Not Yet A Man)
5. "Green Door"
6. "Say a lil something"
7. "我不會愛" (Don't Know How to Love)
8. "阿飛的小蝴蝶" (A-Fei's Little Butterfly)
9. "寂寞還是你" (Lonesome for You)
10. "會痛的石頭" (Stone That Knows Pain)

== Charts ==
Chart Name	Debut Position	Week# / Week Dates of Peak Position	Peak Position	Percentage of Album Sales at Peak
G-Music Mandarin Chart, Taiwan 風雲榜 (華語榜)	#1	#29 / 17–23 July 2009	#1	33.1%
G-Music Combo Chart, Taiwan 風雲榜 (綜合榜)	#1	#29 / 17–23 July 2009	#1	22.76%
Five Music Taiwan; 5大金榜	#1	#30 / 17–23 July 2009	#1	24.45%

Hit Fm Annual Top 100 Singles Chart - 2009
Track name	Position
"王妃" (Princess)	#2
"我不會愛" (Don't Know How to Love)	#4
"阿飛的小蝴蝶" (A-Fei's Little Butterfly)	#9
