= Joanna & Wang Ruo-lin =

2009 album by Joanna Wang

Studio album by Joanna Wang
- Released: 16 January 2009
- Recorded: Burbank and Taipei, November 2008
- Genre: Pop, jazz, soul
- Length: 39:00
- Label: Sony Music Taiwan
- Producer: Bing Wang, Joanna Wang

Joanna Wang chronology
Start from Here (2008)	Joanna & Wang Ruo-lin (2009)	The Things We Do for Love / The Adventures of Bernie the Schoolboy (2011)

Joanna & Wang Ruo-lin is the second studio album by Joanna Wang, released in January 2009. It comprises two discs, given two separate titles: the first, also titled Joanna & Wang Ruo-lin, is described in this article; disc 2 is titled The Adult Storybook, under the name "New Tokyo Terror".

The album's title includes Wang's English and Chinese names, thereby reflecting the duality of the singer and the songwriter. The first disc displays the performer and includes covers of works by other artists. Conversely, the second disc emphasizes the creative Wang, as every song on it was written by her. Although her father, co-producer Ji-ping "Bing" Wang, was involved in the album's production, Wang was given more freedom, enabling her to fully express herself through her music.

== Track listing ==
All songs written by Roger Joseph Manning Jr. (music) and Joanna Wang (lyrics), except where noted.

1. "Tikiville (English)" – 3:52
2. "Maybe Some Other Time (English)" – 3:50
3. "Vincent" (Don McLean) – 5:28
4. "一種念頭" – 4:37
5. "我的愛" – 3:43
6. "Times of Your Life" (music by Roger Nichols, lyrics by Bill Lane) – 3:15
7. "Tikiville (Chinese)" – 3:53
8. "Aubrey" (David Gates) – 4:08
9. "Maybe Some Other Time (Chinese)" – 3:48
10. "玫瑰玫瑰我愛你" (music by Chen Gexin, lyrics by Wu Cun) – 2:26

== Personnel ==
- Joanna Wang - vocals
- Roger Joseph Manning Jr. - piano, electric piano, organ, keyboard, kazoo, marimba
- Val McCallum - electric guitar
- Paul Bushnell - bass
- Brian MacLeod - drums, percussion
- Cary Park - acoustic guitar, mandolin
- Rasheed - acoustic guitar
- Melody Liang - backing vocals

== Production ==
- Producers - Bing Wang, Joanna Wang
- Engineers - Eric Corne,
- Second engineers - Sadaharu Yagi, John Nuss
- Mixing - Craig Burbidge, Eric Corne, Dave Yang
- Mastering - Pete Doell
