= Bob Music =

BOB MUSIC

Studio album by Joanna Wang
- Released: 2 June 2015
- Genre: Bitpop, art pop, indie pop
- Length: 31:42
- Label: Sony Music Taiwan
- Producer: Joanna Wang, Coach & Sendo

Joanna Wang chronology
Midnight Cinema (2014)	BOB MUSIC (2015)	House of Bullies (2016)

BOB MUSIC (Chinese: 鮑伯音樂; pinyin: Bàobó Yīnyuè) is the fourth original album by Taiwanese-American singer-songwriter Joanna Wang, a collaboration with Korean producing duo Coach & Sendo.

The album has been described as both a "rock children's TV show soundtrack", and an album from the perspective of a high school girl. Receiving praise for its unique combination of mundane subject matter with upbeat tunes.

== Track listing ==
All tracks are written by Joanna Wang, except where noted. All tracks arranged by Wang, Coach & Sendo

No.	Title	Lyrics	Music	Length
1.	"Kungfu Sound Bite"	instrumental		0:06
2.	"When I Nod"			2:10
3.	"Truckin' Everyday"			2:17
4.	"Whip Out the Shampoo"			0:46
5.	"Feet"			2:28
6.	"The Scientific Method"			1:48
7.	"Teenager Statement"			2:37
8.	"Liquified Cheese"			0:12
9.	"Ain't She Sweet"	Jack Yellen	Milton Ager	1:37
10.	"I Knew It, I Swear!"			2:48
11.	"I Don't Give a Hoot"			2:17
12.	"Now We're Together Forever and Always"			1:48
13.	"EVERYTHING ANYTHING"			2:00
14.	"Spanish Flea"	Cissy Wechter	Julius Wechter	2:09
15.	"I'm Fucked!"			1:19
16.	"Simply Nothing You Can Do"			5:20
