= Hsieh Ming-yu =

Taiwanese singer and songwriter (born 1969)

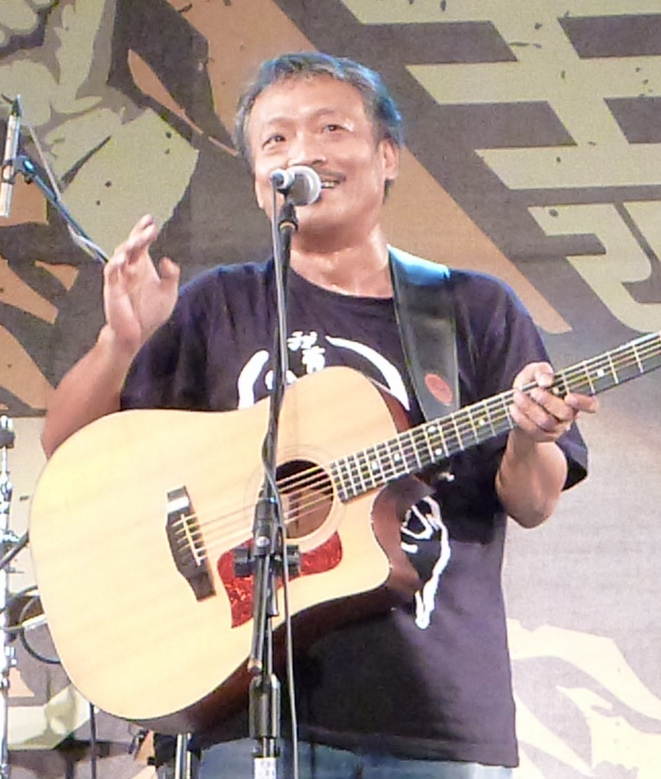
- Born: 8 February 1969 (age 56); Caotun, Nantou County, Taiwan
- Occupation(s): Singer, songwriter
- Awards: Golden Melody Awards – Best Taiwanese Singer; 2013; 2017

Chinese name
- Traditional Chinese: 謝銘祐
Transcriptions
Standard Mandarin
- Hanyu Pinyin: Xiè Míngyòu
Southern Min
- Hokkien POJ: Chiā Bêng-iū
- Musical career
- Origin: Tainan, Taiwan
- Genres: Hokkien pop
- Instrument: guitar

Hsieh Ming-yu (Chinese: 謝銘祐; pinyin: Xiè Míngyòu; Pe̍h-ōe-jī: Chiā Bêng-iū; born 8 February 1969) is a Taiwanese singer-songwriter.

== Biography ==
He was raised in Tainan, and moved to Taipei in 1990, where he wrote several songs for other singers, including Andy Lau, William So, and Anita Mui. He returned to Tainan in 2000 and began composing Hokkien pop songs. He was awarded Best Taiwanese Singer and the Best Taiwanese Album at the 2013 Golden Melody Awards for his album Tainan and was named Best Taiwanese Singer for the second time at the 2017 Golden Melody Awards. Hsieh has often returned to Taipei for performances, and held a concert at SOAS, University of London in 2017. Hsieh later decided to stop writing popular love songs, instead focusing his efforts on the album Skewing South, (偏南; phien-lâm), which featured songs on the contributions of democracy activists Tang Te-chang and Peter Huang, among others.

He taught music and popular culture at Tainan Community College and led the Discover Hoklo in Tainan initiative.
