= Senses Around =

- Senses Around cover

Studio album 感官/世界 by Yoga Lin
- Released: 30 October 2009
- Genre: Mandopop
- Language: Mandarin
- Label: HIM International Music

Yoga Lin chronology
Mystery Guest (2008)	Senses Around (2009)	Perfect Life (2011)

Alternative cover

Senses Around (Chinese: 感官/世界) is Taiwanese Mandopop artist Yoga Lin's second Mandarin studio album. It was released 30 October 2009 by HIM International Music. A second edition Senses Around (Live Collectible Edition) (感官/世界 私藏live影音特輯) was released on 18 December 2009 with a bonus DVD containing live footage from Lin's Yoga's Trick album release concert in Taipei.

The tracks "說謊" (Fairy Tale) and "看見什麼吃什麼" (You Are What You Eat) is listed at number 5 and 27 respectively on Hit Fm Taiwan's Hit Fm Annual Top 100 Singles Chart (Hit-Fm年度百首單曲) for 2009.

The track, "說謊" (Fairy Tale) won one of the Songs of the Year at the 2010 Metro Radio Mandarin Music Awards presented by Hong Kong radio station Metro Info. The album was awarded one of the Top 10 Selling Mandarin Albums of the Year at the 2009 IFPI Hong Kong Album Sales Awards, presented by the Hong Kong branch of IFPI.

== Track listing ==
1. "關於我" (Something About Me)
2. "解High人" (The Spoiler)
3. "看見什麼吃什麼" (You Are What You Eat)
4. "耳朵" (Deaf In Love)
5. "飄" (Gone With the Wind)
6. "說謊" (Fairy Tale)
7. "心酸" (Heartbreak)
8. "唐人街" (China Town)
9. "歇斯底里" (Hysteria)
10. "另一個自己" (Another Me)
11. "感同身受" (Sense)

== Bonus DVD ==
Senses Around (Live Collectible Edition) - Yoga's Trick album release concert, Taipei

1. "歇斯底里" (Hysteria)
2. "感同身受" (Sense)
3. "慢一點" (A Little Slower)
4. "伯樂" (Admirer)
5. "請說" (Please Speak)
6. "說謊" (Fairy Tale)
7. "心酸" (Heartbreak)
8. "唐人街" (China Town)
9. "看見什麼吃什麼" (You Are What You Eat)
10. "I'm Gonna Find Another You"
11. "再別康橋" (Farewell to Cambridge)

== Charts ==
Hit Fm Annual Top 100 Singles Chart - 2009
Track name	Position
"說謊" (Fairy Tale)	#5
"看見什麼吃什麼" (You Are What You Eat)	#27
