= Mystery Guest (album) =

- Mystery Guest cover

Studio album 神秘嘉賓 by Yoga Lin
- Released: 3 June 2008
- Genre: Mandopop
- Language: Mandarin
- Label: HIM International Music

Yoga Lin chronology
Mystery Guest (2008)	Senses Around (2009)

Alternative cover

Mystery Guest (Chinese: 神秘嘉賓; pinyin: Shen Mi Jia Bin) is Taiwanese Mandopop artist Yoga Lin's debut Mandarin studio album. It was released 3 June 2008 by HIM International Music with a bonus DVD containing making-of footage and "神秘嘉賓" (Mystery Guest) music video.

A second edition Mystery Guest (Labyrinth Collectible Edition) (神秘嘉賓 重返迷宮影音珍藏版) was released on 4 July 2008. The music video for title track "神秘嘉賓" (Mystery Guest) features Taiwanese actress Chen Kuangyi.

== Reception ==
The tracks "伯樂" (Admirer), "神秘嘉賓" (Mystery Guest) and "眼色" (Color of Your Eyes) are listed at number 10, 20 and 38 respectively on Hit Fm Taiwan's Hit Fm Annual Top 100 Singles Chart (Hit-Fm年度百首單曲) for 2008. The title track, "神秘嘉賓" (Mystery Guest) won one of the Top 10 Songs of the Year at the 2009 HITO Radio Music Awards presented by Taiwanese radio station Hit FM.

The album was awarded one of the Top 10 Selling Mandarin Albums of the Year at the 2008 IFPI Hong Kong Album Sales Awards, presented by the Hong Kong branch of IFPI.

In 2009, the album was nominated for four awards at the 20th Golden Melody Awards, including Best New Artist for Lin for his work on this album It was awarded Best Single Producer for "眼色" (Color of Your Eyes).

== Track listing ==
No.	Title	Lyrics	Music	Length
1.	"眼色" (Color of Your Eyes)	James Li	James Li	4:41
2.	"神秘嘉賓" (Mystery Guest)	Chén xìn yán	Zhèng nán	5:30
3.	"愛情是圓的" (Love Goes in Circles)	Lán xiăo xié	Dīng shì guāng	3:37
4.	"伯樂" (Admirer)	Peng Xue Bin	Peng Xue Bin	4:34
5.	"請說" (Please Speak)	Yoga Lin	Xī lóu	3:26
6.	"病態" (Morbid)	Albert Leung	Connie Li	3:11
7.	"殘酷月光" (Cruel Moonlight)	Xiàng yuè é	Chén xiăo xiá	4:29
8.	"慢一點" (A Little Slower)	Shī rén chéng	Xiaoyu Sung	3:50
9.	"心有林夕" (A Connection to Albert Leung)	Lán xiăo xié	Zhèng nán	3:56
10.	"再別康橋" (Farewell to Cambridge)	Xu Zhimo	Xī lóu	3:06
11.	"傳說" (Legend feat Jade Liu)	Shī rén chéng	Zhèng nán	5:04

== Charts ==
Hit Fm Annual Top 100 Singles Chart - 2008
Track name	Position
"伯樂" (Admirer)	#10
"神秘嘉賓" (Mystery Guest)	#20
"眼色" (Color of Your Eyes)	#38

== Awards and nominations ==
20th Golden Melody Awards - 2009
Award	Nomination	Result
Best Music Video	Bier Gu (比爾賈) for "病態" (Morbid)	Nominated
Best Composer	James Li (李泉) for "眼色" (Color of Your Eyes)	Nominated
Best Single Producer	Wang Zhi Ping (王治平) and Guo Wen Zong (郭文宗) for "眼色" (Color of Your Eyes)	Won
Best New Artist	Yoga Lin	Nominated
