= The Adult Storybook =

2009 album by Joanna Wang

Studio album by New Tokyo Terror
- Released: 16 January 2009
- Recorded: September 2007, June – November 2008 in Mad Dog Studios, Burbank
- Genre: Pop, soul, jazz, indie pop, pop rock
- Length: 34:22
- Producer: Bing Wang and Joanna Wang

New Tokyo Terror chronology
Start from Here (2008)	The Adult Storybook (2009)	The Things We Do for Love / The Adventures of Bernie the Schoolboy (2011)

The Adult Storybook is an album by New Tokyo Terror, a project of Joanna Wang. The album was included as a second disc in the release of Joanna & Wang Ruo-lin, her second album. Wang has stated that the songs that became The Adult Storybook were the work she sought to release as her second album, but her record company insisted on material that they saw as more commercial: 'My own album ended up being a "buy one get this as a bonus disc" next to the array of songs we ended up adding.'

== Track listing ==
All songs written and composed by Joanna Wang.

1. "Adult Crap" – 3:39
2. "I Guess I'm Paranoid" – 2:57 f
3. "Longing For Romance" – 3:27
4. "His Remedy" – 3:17
5. "Nobody's A Nun" – 3:08
6. "Even If We Did" – 4:47
7. "How I Feel About Businessmen" – 2:15
8. "Man" – 2:21
9. "Palpitation" – 3:39
10. "I'm Pathetic Enough" – 4:52
11. "Thoughts Of A Teacher" - 0:37 (Hidden track)

== Personnel ==
- Joanna Wang - vocals
- Roger Joseph Manning Jr. - piano, electric piano, organ, harmonium, keyboard
- Freddy Koella - acoustic guitar, electric guitar, banjo
- Paul Bushnell - bass, whistling
- Brian MacLeod - drums, percussion

== Production ==
- Producers - Bing Wang, Joanna Wang
- Engineer - Eric Corne
- Second engineers - Sadaharu Yagi, John Nuss
- Mixing - Craig Burbidge, Eric Corne
- Mastering - Pete Doell
- Album design - Joanna Wang, S.M. Cumberworth
