= Hsiao Hung-jen =

- Born: 21 August 1984 (age 41)
- Occupations: Singer-songwriter, musician
- Years active: 2008–present

Chinese name
- Traditional Chinese: 蕭閎仁
- Simplified Chinese: 萧闳仁
Transcriptions
Standard Mandarin
- Hanyu Pinyin: Xiāo Hóng Rén
- Musical career
- Origin: Taiwan
- Genres: C-pop, C-rock
- Instruments: Piano, vocals, keyboards
- Labels: Sony BMG Asia (2008–present)

Hsiao Hung-jen (Chinese: 蕭閎仁; pinyin: Xiāo Hóng Rén; Wade–Giles: Hsiao Hung Jen; Pe̍h-ōe-jī: Siau Hông-jîn; sometimes Xiao Hong Ren; born 21 August 1984) is a Taiwanese musician who notably mixes Taiwanese Hokkien, Mandarin, and occasionally English in his lyrics. He first gained fame at 11 years old when he won a singing competition on Taiwan's popular "Five Light Awards" program.

Hsiao has collaborated with other stars on the Asian pop music scene such as Jay Chou (who directed the music video for Hsiao's first single, "Watch the Sleeves Go Down") and F.I.R.'s Ian Chen. Aside from pop ballads on love and romance, Hsiao's lyrics often focus on social criticism and his Taiwanese roots.

His debut album "Hsiso Hung-Jen Debut Album" was released in May 2008, followed by his second album "His Name is F*ck" in March 2009. His third album was released on 31 December 2010.

Hsiao was nominated in 2009 for "Best Newcomer" in Taiwan's 20th Golden Melody Awards.
