= My Geeky Nerdy Buddies =

- Film poster
- Directed by: Kevin Chu
- Written by: Kevin Chu; Tsai Tsung-han
- Produced by: Chiu Li-Kwan
- Starring: Jam Hsiao; Jiang Shuying; Da Peng
- Music by: Owen Wang
- Production company: Bona International Film Group Ltd.
- Distributed by: Warner Bros Inc. (Taiwan)
- Release dates: July 10, 2014 (Mainland China); August 22, 2014 (Taiwan)
- Running time: 95 minutes
- Countries: China; Taiwan
- Language: Mandarin
- Box office: NT$5.02 million (Taipei)

My Geeky Nerdy Buddies (Chinese: 大宅男) is a 2014 romantic comedy film directed by Kevin Chu. A Chinese-Taiwanese co-production, it was released on July 10, 2014, in China but the film was withdrawn on the next day, citing "malicious competition" from the studio Bona Film Group. The film stars Jam Hsiao as A Zhai, and Jiang Shuying as Yaling.

== Summary ==
Otaku and his roommate Mr. Cheap are known as the ultimate geeks of their university. However, like any normal guy, their goal is to fall in love with the girls of their dreams. To get close to his goddess Mei, Mr. Cheap pretends to be a spoiled rich kid, appearing everywhere she goes. Meanwhile, the introverted Otaku tries to create a chance to talk to class beauty Ling by running into her in the hallway, only to have his plan fail awkwardly.

== Cast ==
- Jam Hsiao as A Zhai 阿宅
- Jiang Shuying as Yaling 雅玲
- Da Peng as Kou Nan 摳男
- Xie Na as Chuan Mei 川美
- Chen Bor-jeng as Lao Zhai 老宅
- Cai Weijia as Gao Gao Di 高高迪
- Chang Chin-lan as A Mei 阿梅
- Shanny A
- Popping Kuang
- Matt Wu as Wu Shouzheng 吳守正
- Tony Chen
- Lin Mei-hsiu as Yaling's mom 雅玲媽

== Reception ==
It has grossed NT$5.02 million in Taipei.
