= Love Moments =

Love Moments: Self Selection
- Love Moments: Self Selection cover

Studio album 愛的時刻 自選輯 by Jam Hsiao
- Released: 13 November 2009
- Genre: Mandopop
- Language: Mandarin
- Label: Warner Music Taiwan
- Producer: Adia (阿弟仔)

Jam Hsiao chronology
Princess (2009)	Love Moments: Self Selection (2009)

Love Moments: Self Selection (Chinese: 愛的時刻 自選輯) is Taiwanese Mandopop artist Jam Hsiao's first Mandarin tribute album and third album release. It was released on 13 November 2009 by Warner Music Taiwan.

The album features cover versions of classic songs by Mandopop divas such as Jolin Tsai, Stefanie Sun, A-Mei, Tanya Chua and Faye Wong and was recorded in less than a month with a live band. The first lead track "新不了情" (New Endless Love) is the song that failed Hsiao in the PK challenge of One Million Star in 2007.

== Reception ==
The album debuted at number one on Taiwan's G-Music Top 20 Weekly Mandarin and Combo Charts at week 46, and Five Music Chart at week 47 with a percentage sales of 20.47%, 9.88% and 42.62% respectively.

The tracks "倒帶" (Rewind) and "新不了情" (New Endless Love) are listed at number 18 and 21 respectively on Hit Fm Taiwan's Hit Fm Annual Top 100 Singles Chart (Hit-Fm年度百首單曲) for 2009.

The track, "新不了情" (New Endless Love) won one of the Songs of the Year at the 2010 Metro Radio Mandarin Music Awards presented by Hong Kong radio station Metro Info.

== Track listing ==
NB. Title - Lyricist / Composer by Original artist

1. "開到荼蘼" (The Very Last Blossom) - Albert Leung / C Y Kong by Faye Wong - 4:50
2. "新不了情" (New Endless Love) - 黃鬱 / Chris Babida by One-Fang - 4:24
3. "如果沒有你" (If I Don't Have You) - 李焯雄 / 左安安 by Karen Mok - 4:38
4. "夢一場" (A Dream) - 袁惟仁 / 袁惟仁 by Na Ying - 3:49
5. "無言花" (The Silent Flower) - 陳黎鐘 / 陳小霞 by Jody Chiang - 4:27
6. "我懷念的" (What I Miss Most) - Yáo Ruòlóng / Lee Shih Shiong by Stefanie Sun from Against the Light - 5:02
7. "記念" (Remembrance) - 姚謙 / Tanya Chua by Tanya Chua - 3:50
8. "寫一首歌" (To Write A Song) - 順子 and JEFF C. / 順子 by Shunza (順子) - 4:57
9. "記得" (Remember) - 易家揚 / JJ Lin by A-mei - 4:56
10. "倒帶" (Rewind) - Vincent Fang / Jay Chou by Jolin Tsai from Castle - 4:36

== Charts ==
Chart Name	Debut Position	Week# / Week Dates of Peak Position	Peak Position	Percentage of Album Sales at Peak
G-Music Mandarin Chart, Taiwan 風雲榜 (華語榜)	#1	#46 / 13–19 November 2009	#1	20.47%
G-Music Combo Chart, Taiwan 風雲榜 (綜合榜)	#1	#46 / 13–19 November 2009	#1	9.88%
Five Music Taiwan; 5大金榜	#1	#47 / 13–19 November 2009	#1	42.62%

Hit Fm Annual Top 100 Singles Chart - 2009
Track name	Position
"倒帶" (Rewind)	#18
"新不了情" (New Endless Love)	#21
