= Yoeko Kurahashi =

Japanese singer songwriter (born 1976)

Yoeko (Yoeko Kurahashi)
- Born: September 20, 1976 (age 49)
- Genres: Jazz
- Occupation: Singer-songwriter
- Instruments: Vocals, piano
- Years active: 2000–2008; 2023–current
- Label: BabeStar

Yoeko Kurahashi (倉橋 ヨエコ, Kurahashi Yoeko) is a Japanese singer and songwriter who made music between 2000 and 2008 before quitting. In 2023 she returned to making music. A piano book featuring her work has also been released.

== History ==
Yoeko attended Aichi Prefectural High School in Meiwa, Nagoya, Japan and graduated in music.

She started releasing music in 2000, a mini-album titled Thank (礼) was released on November 23, 2000. In 2005, Yoeko joined BabeStar music label. She continued to release music every single year until on April 30, 2008, she suddenly declared that she was going to "withdraw from the industry" and two months later on June 4, she released her final album, titled Dismantle the Piano (解体ピアノ).

Yoeko went on a farewell tour for Dismantle the Piano (解体ピアノ) which included a nationwide tour of 6 cities across Japan, the tour started on June 28, 2008. The tour ended on July 20 at Tokyo Kinema Club. On the last day of July her official website shut down.

Almost 15 years after Yoeko quit music, on July 1, 2023 she announced her return and the resumption of activities under the new name "Yoeko".

== Discography ==
Singles

Ningen Yametemo (2002)

- 1. Ningen Yametemo
- 2. Tokyo Dodonpa Musume
- 3. Shabada★Tengoku
- 4. Shizumeru Machi

Son to Uso (2007)

- 1. Son to Uso
- 2. Namida de Yuki wa Ana Darake
- 3. Ryuusei (Hitori Rendan ver.)

Tomodachi no Uta (2008)

- 1. Tomodachi no Uta
- 2. Mannequin Ningen

Jewelry/Shohosen (2010)

- 1. Jewelry
- 2. Shohosen

Country Color/Doremi Song (2025)

- 1. Country Color (New Yoeko ver.)
- 2. Doremi Song (New Yoeko ver.)
- 3. Country Color (Instrumental ver.)
- 4. Doremi Song (Instrumental ver.)

Albums

Okaerinasai (2000)

- 1. Kikoeta Kara
- 2. Kaeritai Ie
- 3. Miteru Dake
- 4. Omoimeguri
- 5. Heya to Maboroshi

Rei (2000)

- 1. Kanshateki Seikatsu
- 2. Kikoeta Kara (Remake of "Kikoeta Kara" from the "Okaerinasai" album)
- 3. Okujou Nite
- 4. Anata no Atashi
- 5. Heya to Maboroshi (Remake of "Heya to Maboroshi) from the "Okaerinasai" album)
- 6. Kyouken
- 7. Kaeritai Ie (Remake of "Kaeritai Ie) from the "Okaerinasai" album)

Omoutsubo (2001)

- 1. Kahogo
- 2. Mamagoto~Do Re Mi
- 3. Kissa Bossa
- 4. Omoimeguri (Remake of "Omoimeguri" from the "Okaerinasai" album)
- 5. Omoutsubo
- 6. Aware Kagoi
- 7. Houkago Jidai
- 8. Nakidomezai

Fujin'You (2002)

- 1. Torarekei
- 2. Kingyo Omou
- 3. Love Letter
- 4. Ren'item
- 5. An Doughnuts
- 6. Yona Yona Yona
- 7. Nokorimono
- 8. Doki no Uta
- 9. Tsuyuiro Kouta
- 10. Cabaret

Modern Girl (2003)

- 1. Koi no Daisousa
- 2. Saiwaya
- 3. Tsubutsubu
- 4. Amayadori
- 5. Radio
- 6. Tsubakisou
- 7. Kissa Scat
- 8. Oningyou
- 9. M-9 Tsuisekikei
- 10. Ryuusei

Tokyo Piano (2004)

- 1. Tokyo
- 2. Shiroi Hata
- 3. Robot
- 4. Akai Kutsu
- 5. Asayake
- 6. Nibanme no Michi
- 7. Fuan no Oyama
- 8. Mori e Iku
- 9. Hanaichimonme
- 10. Mannequin
- 11. Amefuri
- 12. Hibari
- 13. Shuuten

Taidaima (2005)

- 1. Tate
- 2. Koko ni Iru
- 3. Sen o Kaku
- 4. Seesaw
- 5. Tamagotoji
- 6. Uragaeshi
- 7. Scenario
- 8. Sekken Girl
- 9. Hiru no Tsuki
- 10. Pierrot
- 11. Haru no Uta

Ochugen (2006)

- 1. Natsu
- 2. Radio
- 3. Tsuiseki (Remake of "M.9 Tsuisekikei" from "Modern Girl" album)
- 4. Tokyo
- 5. Tate (Grand Piano and Self-Accompanied Version)

Iroiro (2007)

- 1. Sakuramichi
- 2. Kusuribako
- 3. Itadakimasu
- 4. Akai Yane no Shita de
- 5. Hana to Dance
- 6. Aiai
- 7. Houteishiki
- 8. Daruma-san ga Koronda
- 9. Son to Uso
- 10. Kyou mo Ame
- 11. Shiro no Sekai
- 12. Haru Natsu Aki Fuyu

Kaitai Piano (2008)

- 1. Naranai Piano
- 2. Izonshou ~Let's Go, High Heel!~
- 3. Haru-machi Girl
- 4. Denwa
- 5. Urame no Onna
- 6. Tomodachi no Uta
- 7. Koi Yohou
- 8. Balloon no Fushigi na Tabi
- 9. Anata
- 10. Ame no Hanyuubashi
- 11. Mannequin Ningen (Extra Piano Mix)
- 12. Rondo

Shuugakushou (2008) A compilation of Yoeko Kurahashi's hit

- 1. Kanshateki Seikatsu
- 2. Kikoeta Kara
- 3. Kahogo
- 4. Mamagoto
- 5. Torarekei
- 6. Love Letter
- 7. Yona Yona Yona
- 8. Tsuyuiro Kouta
- 9. Ningen Yametemo
- 10. Koi no Daisousa
- 11. Ryuusei
- 12. Mayoi Neko
- 13. Tokyo
- 14. Shiroi Hata
- 15. Hanaichimonme
- 16. Tate
- 17. Tamagotoji
- 18. Natsu
- 19. Radio (Ochugen Album)
- 20. Son to Uso
- 21. Namida de Yuki wa Ana Darake
- 22. Sakuramichi
- 23. Kyou mo Ame
- 24. Shiro no Sekai
- 25. Kawazu no Uta
- 26. Naranai Piano
- 27. Izonshou ~Let's go, High Heel!~
- 28. Shohosen
- 29. Rondo
- 30. Jewelry

Kaizoku Piano (2008)

- 1. Jitensha
- 2. Mori e Iku (Asayake Mix)
- 3. Miteru Dake (Remake of "Miteru Dake" from the "Okaerinasai" Album)
- 4. Hanaichimonme (Kaisouhen)
- 5. Kusuriyubi no Tame no Étude
- 6. Shiroi Hata (Acoustic)
- 7. Kudaridzuki
- 8. Koi no Airport (Original version of "Koi no Daisousa" from "Modern Girl" album)
- 9. Tsubutsubu (Tsubutsubu Zouryou Mix)
- 10. Kyouken Futatabi (Inchiki Techno Hen) (Remake and Extended version of "Kyouken" from the "Rei" album)
- 11. Nokorimono (Acoustic)
- 12. Ningen Yametemo (Yajigami Yoeko Mix)
- 13. Ren'item (Acoustic)
- 14. Lemon Cake

New Yoeko (2023)

- 1. Tomodachi no Uta (New Yoeko ver.)
- 2. Yona Yona Yona (New Yoeko ver.)
- 3. Tamagotoji (New Yoeko ver.)
- 4. Hiru no Tsuki (New Yoeko ver.)
- 5. Kyou mo Ame (New Yoeko ver.)
- 6. Dopamine
- 7. Tate (New Yoeko ver.)

New Yoeko II ~Rhapsody~ (2024)

- 1. music
- 2. Kanshateki Seikatsu (New Yoeko ver.)
- 3. Mamagoto (New Yoeko ver.)
- 4. Torarekei (New Yoeko ver.)
- 5. Ningen Yametemo (New Yoeko ver.)
- 6. Ryuusei (New Yoeko ver.)
- 7. music (Acoustic ver.)

New Yoeko III ~For You~ (2025)

- 1. Kahogo (New Yoeko ver.)
- 2. Shizumeru Machi (New Yoeko ver.)
- 3. Tsuyuiro Kouta (New Yoeko ver.)
- 4. Shabada★Tenguko (New Yoeko ver.)
- 5. Shohosen (New Yoeko ver.)
- 6. Itadakimasu (New Yoeko ver.)
- 7. Haru no Uta (New Yoeko ver.)
- 8. Tsuuchihyou
- Unreleased Tracks Some songs from this list have been found while the remainders are songs that are already released, retitled before their official release or remain unreleased.
- 1. Nakanaori wa Taifuu ni Notte
- 2. Chiisana Iedesaki (No Audio of it found yet)
- 3. Shitsuren to Koi no Yukue (No Audio of it found yet)
- 4. Hatsukoi no Hanabana (No Audio of it found yet)
- 5. Imouto Suki (No Audio of it found yet)
- 6. Zangyou Musume
- 7. Himawarizaka (No Audio of it found yet)
- 8. Kazefuki Senro (No Audio of it found yet)
- 9. Higurashi ni Tsuite
- 10. Kanashii Oshaberi
- 12. Miteru Dake
- 13. Kidzukubeki Koto
- 14. Okujou Nite
- 15. Mori e Iku
- 16. Kikoeta Kara

Extras

- 1. Kingyo Omou (From V.A: Oto no Ana 5)
- 2. Koi no Fuga (From V.A: Ska de Hit Parade!)
- 3. Mayoi Neko (From V.A: RARE & NOSTA)
- 4. Kawazu no Uta (From V.A: Yoidore Shijin ni Naru Mae ni)
- 5. Kimi to Yakusoku Shita Basho (A cover of another song)
