= Fiction (Yoga Lin album) =

- "Fiction" album cover art

Studio album by Yoga Lin
- Released: 22 June 2012
- Genre: Mandopop, ballad, pop
- Length: 41:37
- Language: Mandarin
- Label: HIM International Music

Yoga Lin chronology
Perfect Life (2011)	Fiction (2012)	Jazz Channel (2013)

Fiction, often stylized as fiction (Chinese: 大/小說家) is Taiwanese Mandopop artist Yoga Lin's fourth Mandarin studio album. It was released on 22 June 2012 by HIM International Music. It was ranked #1 in Taipei Times's list of top five Mandarin albums of 2012. Yoga Lin co-produced most songs on the album, and participated in the writing of the lyrics and mixing of the songs.

== Background ==
The concept of the album was to use music to tell a story, and each song on the album functions as a short story. The whole album becomes a ten song collection of short stories in a multitude of genres as science fiction, romance, horror, allegory, and so on. Songs like "说谎 (Fairytale)", "心酸 (Heartbreak)" and "早开的晚霞 (Early Sunset Clouds)" from earlier albums made him famous, which all conveys Yoga Lin's characteristic melancholic sound. Yoga Lin and his producers agreed that for the fourth album they wanted to try something different to record a more powerful performance, as well as showcase his talents in various styles of music.

== Track listing ==
No.	Title	Lyrics	Music	Length
1.	"思凡 (Si Fan)" (Mundane Desires / Thinking About The World)	Lan Xiao Xie	JerryC	3:52
2.	"Runaway Mama"	Chen Xin Yan	Skot Suyama (陶山)	3:57
3.	"越反越愛 (Yue Fan Yue Ai)" (Romeo and Juliet Syndrome / The More Opposition, The More You Love)	Daryl Yao	Bernard Zheng	4:38
4.	"浪費 (Lang Fei)" (Unrequited / Waste)	Yuen Chen	Zheng Nan	5:07
5.	"誘 (You)" (Lure / Seduction)	Derek Shih	JerryC	3:25
6.	"週末夜驚魂 (Zhou Mo Ye Jing Hun)" (Saturday Night Fright)	Chen Xin Yan	Yang Pu	3:36
7.	"4號病房 (Si Hao Bing Fang)" (The Written Notes of Patient No. 4 / On The 4th Ward)	Lan Xiao Xie	Ni Hong Mu	3:45
8.	"勉強幸福 (Mian Qiang Xing Fu)" (Reluctant Happiness / Fool's Bliss)	Albert Leung	Bernard Zheng	4:42
9.	"傻子 (Sha Zi)" (Fool)	Bernard Zheng	Bernard Zheng	3:35
10.	"拾荒 (Shi Huang)" (Vulture)	Xu Min Ling	Jin Zhe	5:00
Total length:				41:37

== Music videos ==
1. Lure (誘) (30/05/2012)
2. Fools' Bliss (勉強幸福) (18/06/2012)
3. Romeo and Juliet Syndrome (越反越愛) (27/06/2012)
4. Runaway Mama (28/08/2012)
5. Unrequited (浪費) (19/12/2012)
6. Vulure (拾荒) (20/12/2012)
