= 20th Golden Melody Awards =

Taiwan music awards ceremony in 2009

- Location: Taipei Arena, Taiwan
- Hosted by: Tao Ching-Ying & Patty Hou

Television/radio coverage
- Network: Azio TV

Ceremonies of the 20th Golden Melody Awards were held at the Taipei Arena in Taipei, Taiwan on June 27, 2009.

== Registration process ==
Registration for entry into the 20th Golden Melody Awards was opened December 1–31, 2008. In order to enhance the fairness of decisions, the Government Information Office promised to increase the number of judges, based on recommendations from industry experts. Several changes were also announced to the list of categories that will receive awards:

- The award for Best Music Video Director will become the award for Best Music Video to recognize advancements made by the recording industry.
- In the artistic and traditional music categories, there will be separate awards for Best Folk Drama Album, Best Ethnic Music Album, and Best Traditional Music Album in order to clarify the different target segments.
- The definition of "album" in the popular music categories, which initially read "six or more songs with a total length of 30 minutes (without the accompaniment versions)", will be changed to "a new arrangement of performance works".

Registration is open to works released between January 1 and December 31, 2008 (Minguo calendar year 97). Winners in an individual category will receive NT$100,000, while winners of published works will receive NT$150,000. If the award is shared by two or more persons, winners will decide how to allocate the reward money.

== Nominees ==
Nominees for awards were announced on May 15, 2009.

=== Popular Music categories ===
==== Song Of The Year ====
- Fragrant Rice (稻香) – Capricorn (魔杰座) – Jay Chou
  - 100 Ways of Living (100種生活) – 100 Ways of Living (100種生活) – Crowd Lu (盧廣仲)
  - Hold You Tightly (甲你攬牢牢) – Hold You Tightly (甲你攬牢牢) – Jody Chiang
  - South of the Border (國境之南) – Cape No. 7 soundtrack – Van Fan (范逸臣)
  - The Next Dawn (下一個天亮) – The Next Dawn (下一個天亮) – Claire Kuo
  - You're Not Truly Happy (你不是真正的快樂) – Poetry of the Day After (後青春期的詩) – Mayday

==== Pop Album Of The Year ====
- Don't Want to Let Go (不想放手) – Eason Chan
  - 100 Ways of Living (100種生活) – Crowd Lu (盧廣仲)
  - Capricorn (魔杰座) – Jay Chou
  - If One Thing Is Important (如果有一件事是重要的) – Sandee Chan (陳珊妮)
  - We All Lay Down in the End (最后只好躺下来) – Stanley Huang

==== Best Male Pop Vocal Performance ====
- Jay Chou – Capricorn (魔杰座)
  - Eason Chan – Don't Want to Let Go (不想放手)
  - Khalil Fong – Orange Moon (橙月)
  - Leehom Wang – Heart Beat (心·跳)
  - Ricky Hsiao – I am Ricky Hsiao (我是蕭煌奇)

==== Best Female Pop Vocal Performance ====
- Sandee Chan (陳珊妮) – If One Thing Is Important (如果有一件事是重要的)
  - A-lin (黃麗玲) – Diva (天生歌姬)
  - Fish Leong – Today is Our Valentine's Day (今天情人節)
  - Tanya Chua – My Space
  - Tsai Chin – No Regrets (不悔)

==== Best New Artist ====
- Crowd Lu (盧廣仲) – 100 Ways of Living (100種生活), sung by Crowd Lu (盧廣仲)
  - Hsiao Hung Jen (蕭閎仁) – Hsiao Hung Jen (蕭閎仁)
  - Jam Hsiao – Jam Hsiao (蕭敬騰)
  - Joanna Wang – Start from Here
  - Rachel Liang (梁文音) – Love Poem (愛的詩篇)
  - Yoga Lin – Mystery Guest (神秘嘉賓)

==== Best Band ====
- Mayday – Poetry of the Day After (後青春期的詩)
  - 13 Band (拾參樂團) – Horse-Faced Sailor's Summer (馬臉水手的夏天)
  - Natural Q (自然捲) – Breakthrough (破捲而出)
  - The Chairmen (董事長樂團) – Spent All His Money (花光他的錢)
  - The Hohak Band (好客愛吃飯) – Rice and Love (愛吃飯)

==== Best Composer ====
- Crowd Lu (盧廣仲) – 100 Ways of Living (100種生活), sung by Crowd Lu (盧廣仲)
  - Jay Chou – Fragrant Rice (稻香), sung by Jay Chou
  - Khalil Fong – Singalongsong, sung by Khalil Fong
  - Li Ch'üan (李泉) – Gaze (眼色), sung by Yoga Lin
  - Purdur (陳建年) – Memories of the Ancients (烙印祖靈), sung by the Nanwan Sisters (南王姐妹花)

==== Best Lyricist ====
- Wu Yü-hsüan (巫宇軒) – In the Trollycar (電車內面), sung by Jody Chiang
  - Ashin – Like Smoke (如煙), sung by Mayday
  - Ashin – The Yet Unbroken Part of My Heart (我心中尚未崩壞的地方), sung by Mayday
  - Jay Chou – Fragrant Rice (稻香), sung by Jay Chou
  - Yen Yün-nung (嚴云農) – South of the Border (國境之南), sung by Van Fan (范逸臣)

==== Best Arrangement ====
- Martin Tan – As Love Begins to Mend, for Joanna Wang
  - Chung Ch'eng-hu (鍾成虎), Ch'en Pai-chou (陳柏州), and Crowd Lu (盧廣仲) – Good Morning, Beautiful Dawn! (早安,晨之美!), for Crowd Lu (盧廣仲)
  - Leehom Wang – No Reason to Pay Attention to You (我完全沒有任何理由理你), for Leehom Wang
  - Khalil Fong – Singalongsong, for Khalil Fong
  - Chung Hsing-min (鍾興民) – Mr. Magic (魔術先生), for Jay Chou

==== Best Album Producer ====
- Purdur (陳建年) – The Nanwan Sisters (南王姐妹花), released by the Nanwan Sisters (南王姐妹花)
  - Ch'en Tzu-hung (陳子鴻) and Jody Chiang – Hold You Tightly (甲你攬牢牢), released by Jody Chiang
  - Jay Chou – Capricorn (魔杰座), released by Jay Chou
  - Sandee Chan (陳珊妮) – If One Thing Is Important (如果有一件事是重要的), released by Sandee Chan (陳珊妮)
  - Stanley Huang and Jae Chong – We All Lay Down in the End (最后只好躺下来), released by Stanley Huang

==== Best Single Producer ====
- Lü Sheng-fei (呂聖斐) – South of the Border (國境之南), released for the Cape No. 7 soundtrack
- Lim Giong (林強) – Bosom (交心), released for the CC Asia Band
- Kay Huang (黃韻玲) – Hope for Love (對愛渴望), released by Aska Yang
- Wang Chih-p'ing (王治平) and Kuo Wen-tsung (郭文宗) – Gaze (眼色), released by Yoga Lin
- Lin Sheng-yang (林生祥) – Drying the Fields (曬穀場), released by Wu Sheng (吳晟)

==== Best Singing Group ====
- The Nanwan Sisters (南王姐妹花) – The Nanwan Sisters (南王姐妹花)
  - Da Mouth – Wanka (王元口力口)
  - NyLas – /ˈnaɪləs/
  - Y2J – Live for You (為你而活)

==== Best Music Video ====
- Mr. Magic (魔術先生), directed and sung by Jay Chou
  - Black and White (黑白), directed by Penny Tai and sung by Khalil Fong
  - Love's Miracle Cure (愛情靈藥), directed by Kao Hui (高輝) and sung by Josie Ho
  - Morbid (病態), directed by Bounce (比爾賈) and sung by Yoga Lin
  - Spacebomb (太空彈), directed by Wang Jen-li (王仁裡) and sung by Wu Bai & China Blue
  - The Happiest Thing (最幸褔的事), directed by Chou Ke-tai (周格泰) and sung by Rachel Liang (梁文音)
  - Wind (風), directed by Penny Tai and sung by Abin (方炯鑌)

==== Best Religion Music Album ====
  - Stabat Mater 聖母哀悼曲 ／ 凌軒企業社
  - 聖母之歌 ／ 財團法人聖保祿孝女會附設上智文化事業
  - 慈悲三昧水懺 ／ 如是我聞文化股份有限公司
  - 天。詩-心靈牧者 ／ 生活力人文工作室
  - 貝斯特的聖誕 ／ 社團法人台灣彩虹愛家生命教育協會
  - 來自發源地的呼喚 ／ 財團法人台灣基督長老教會泰雅爾中會

==== Best Singer ====
- Peter Lee 李文智／Stabat Mater 聖母哀悼曲／凌軒企業社
  - 李靜芳／李靜芳個人唱唸專輯(歡喜咱來學阿旦，珠圓玉潤阿旦歌)／李靜芳戲曲工作室
  - Chukie Tethong (fr:Kelsang Chukie Tethong) (葛莎雀吉) ／修行的女性／源動力文化發展事業有限公司
  - 王鳳珠／王鳳珠的山歌戲／吉聲影視音有限公司
  - 福爾摩沙合唱團／完美結合Perfection／福爾摩沙合唱團
  - 阿拉坦其其格、扎格達蘇榮／蒙古長調民歌／風潮音樂國際股份有限公司

==== Best Aboriginal Singer ====
- 賴宜絜/變－臺灣當代箏樂演奏 ／ 喜瑪拉雅音樂事業股份有限公司
  - 古苑尋聲－王世榮的琵琶新視界 ／ 普音文化事業股份有限公司
  - 昭君出塞 ／ 風潮音樂國際股份有限公司
  - 箜篌引－任潔的古箏暢響 ／ 風潮音樂國際股份有限公司
  - 古琴 ／ 風潮音樂國際股份有限公司

==== Lifetime Contribution Award ====
- Wu Zhaonan
