= Yoga Lin =

- 林宥嘉
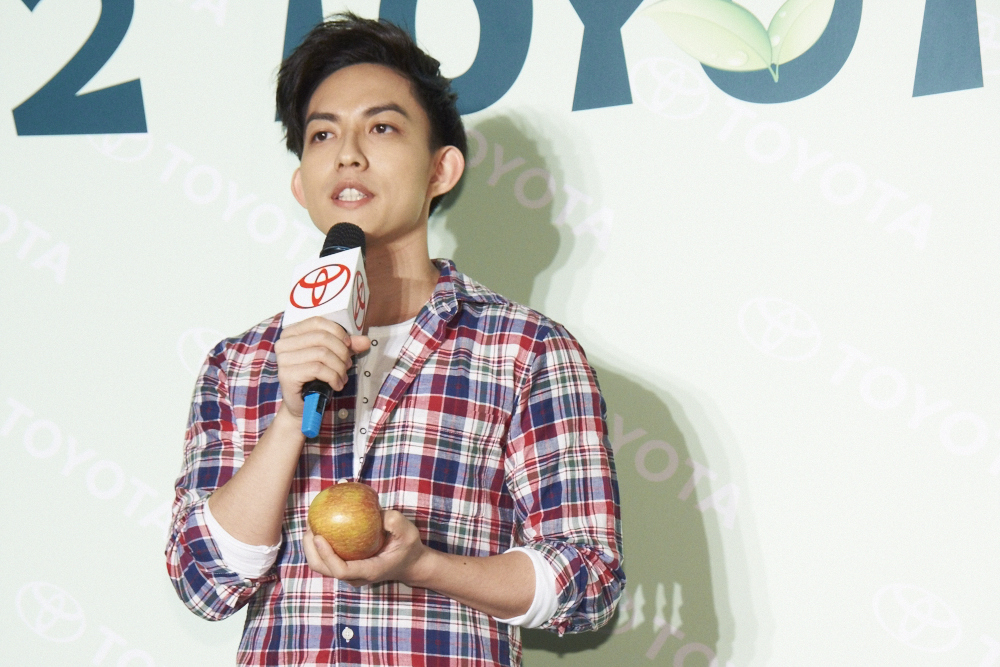
- Lin in 2012
- Born: July 1, 1987 (age 39); Chaojhou, Pingtung, Taiwan
- Education: National Dong Hwa University
- Occupation: Singer-songwriter
- Years active: 2007–present
- Spouse: Kiki Ting (m. 2017)
- Children: Kubbe (son); Pippi (daughter)
- Musical career
- Also known as: James Lin; Lin Youjia
- Genres: Mandopop, soft rock, jazz, swing, rock & roll, R&B
- Instruments: Vocals, piano, guitar
- Label: HIM International Music (2007–present)

Chinese name
- Chinese: 林宥嘉
Transcriptions
Standard Mandarin
- Hanyu Pinyin: Lín Yòujiā
Southern Min
- Hokkien POJ: Lîm Iū-ka

Yoga Lin Youjia (Chinese: 林宥嘉; pinyin: Lín Yòujiā; born July 1, 1987) is a Taiwanese singer. He was the winner of One Million Star, Season 1, a reality TV singing competition in Taiwan. After winning first place in Season One, he was signed by HIM International Music along with three fellow contestants, Judy Chou (周定緯), Peter Pan (潘裕文) and Stanly Hsu (許仁杰). Before the release of his debut album titled Mystery Guest in Taiwan on June 3, 2009, Lin has released two compilation albums and an Idol Drama soundtrack. In May–June 2008, Lin set another record in Taiwan for being the youngest singer, with a yet-to-be released debut album to hold a solo concert tour in three major cities of Taiwan.

He ended his Yoga's Trick Concert Tour in Hong Kong and Singapore in early 2009 and released his second album, Senses Around on October 30, 2009. His third studio album, Perfect Life, was released on May 6, 2011. His fourth studio album, Fiction, was released on June 22, 2012. He released his Jazz live performance compilation album JAZZ CHANNEL on February 5, 2013.

== Early life ==
During high school, Lin was the lead singer of a rock band, and was trained under a renowned Taiwanese rock singer, Roger Yang. He then joined another rock band in his university and continued to perfect his singing techniques and, experimented various music genres. Having never participated in any formal singing contest before, Lin attended the Kaohsiung audition for the first season of One Million Star, a televised singing competition in Taiwan.

== Personal life ==
In June 2013, Lin and Hong Kong singer G.E.M. had an open relationship and they both traveled together in Germany and Austria. In February 2014, the two had since broke up.

On August 13, 2014, he briefly left the music scene and officially enlisted in the military. On July 22, 2015, Lin officially discharged from the army.

In May 2014, Lin and fellow singer Kiki Ting's relationship was officially made public. On January 7, 2017, Lin and Ting officially registered their marriage; on June 26, the two held a wedding banquet in Taipei. On August 3, 2018, Ting gave birth to a son, whose nickname is Kubi. On the evening of March 27, 2020, Lin announced that Ting gave birth to their second child and their daughter's name was Pippi.

== Career ==
=== One Million Star (2007) ===
In the competition, Lin impressed the judges with his vivid interpretation of Steel Rope Walker (走鋼索的人, originally by James Li or Quan Li, 李泉). His performance was then described as "enchanting"(迷幻) by the hostess of One Million Star, Matilda Tao (陶晶瑩), for both his distinctive, dreamy vocals and his facial expressions. He was also complimented for the consistently good performances. Lin earned "perfect scores" (scoring 20 and above) cumulatively for over five weeks and a grand total of nine "perfect scores" on different occasions. His last five performances, which would count as a final result in the final match, accumulated, 17, 23, 23, 23, 25 points, which adds up to 111. This record would hold until 張心傑, in the fourth season (from 2009/03/06 to 2009/03/20) scored 24, 22, 23, 23, 22, totaling up 114. Lin also earned great recognition for his abilities to perform a wide range of music genres, being able to infuse his own touch into songs as well as his unique taste in song selections.

In the first season finale (broadcast live and nationwide) of One Million Star on July 6, 2007, Lin performed a bold and challenging rendition of Radiohead's classic hit, Creep and he used the opportunity to declare his attitude towards music. A perfect score of 25 was unanimously given by all five professional judges to acknowledge his sincere and stylish interpretation of the song. Along with that, another perfect-scored performance of Eason Chan's Last Order determined him as the winner in the first season of One Million Star.

=== HIM International Music (2007–present) ===
After the show, One Million Star, Lin signed a six-year contract with HIM International Music, and released two compilation albums and the soundtrack of TV series Bull Fighting (鬥牛,要不要). In the meanwhile, he participated in many live performances as well as TV commercial shootings. Some of his many endorsements includes the SYM MIO Scooters and a Science Fair held by National Science Council in Taiwan. Recently, he endorsed the Hi-Chew Candy and the HeySong FIN Sports Drink in Taiwan.

In September 2007, Lin performed in Hong Kong with label mate, Tank for several live performances. Later that year, in November and December, he went again to Hong Kong and, Singapore and Malaysia for a promotional tour. On December 29, 2007, Lin, together with other fellow contestants from One Million Star as Judy Chou (周定緯), Peter Pan (潘裕文), Stanly Hsu (許仁杰), and Aska Yang (楊宗緯) performed in their first concert "Superstar Avenue Reunion" in the Sports Center of National Taiwan University. This concert also sets the record in Taiwan for being the shortest amount of time newcomers in the local mandopop scene to hold a concert. This sold-out concert successfully attracted over 4000 audiences. On March 15, 2008, Lin together with fellow record label singers held their first official overseas concert in Genting, Malaysia. On August 3, 2008, Lin and fellow record label singers held two consecutive concerts in Hong Kong, with all 6,000 tickets sold out within 2 days. On October 3, Lin was invited to perform in the 5th Asia Song Festival in Seoul, Korea, and was awarded the Best Taiwan Newcomer Award. On October 25, 2008, Lin won the Annual Popularity Artist and Best Newcomer in Singapore Hit Award. Moreover, his album Mystery Guest won the prestigious Best Producer Award.

Lin's debut album titled Mystery Guest was released on June 3, 2008, in Taiwan. This album won rave reviews from critics as well as the fans. It was also a commercial success, with more than 40,000 copies sold in the first week, and topped all the major musical and radio charts in Taiwan, Hong Kong, Singapore, Malaysia and China. Mystery Guest and Lin are nominated in 6 different categories in the 2008 Singapore Hit Award, including best album, best producer, best male singer, best newcomer, most popular singer, and most popular newcomer, and won the best producer and newcomer awards.

To coincide with his album release, he also held his three nationwide concert tour titled Yoga's Trick Concert Tour (林宥嘉2008迷宮巡迴演唱會) in Taipei, Taichung, and Kaohsiung respectively. He now holds the record of being the youngest recording artist to tour in Taiwan. In this concert tour, he won critical acclaims for his high-caliber repertoire and outstanding stage performance.

Lin held his Yoga's Trick Concert in Hong Kong on January 23 and 24 and both nights' tickets were sold-out. There were four encores on the second night, stretching the concert to over 3 hours. For the sixth and final stop of the concert tour, it was held in Singapore on February 20 with 7000 fans at the Singapore Indoor Stadium. He released his second album, Senses Around on October 30, 2009. His latest and third album, Perfect Life, was released on May 6, 2011, in Taiwan, China and other parts of Asia and he is currently promoting the album. His record company, HIM International Music has also announced that he will be going on concert tour starting August 2011, in cities such as Taipei, Hong Kong, Shanghai, Beijing, Guangzhou, Hangzhou, etc.

== Discography ==
=== Studio albums ===
#	Release date	Title	Label
1st	June 3, 2008	Mystery Guest (神秘嘉賓)	HIM International Music
2nd	October 30, 2009	Senses Around (感官/世界)	HIM International Music
3rd	May 6, 2011	Perfect Life (美妙生活)	HIM International Music
4th	June 22, 2012	Fiction (大/小說家)	HIM International Music
5th	June 17, 2016	Sell Like Hot Cakes (今日營業中)	HIM International Music
6th	March 19, 2024	Love, Lord	HIM International Music

=== Live albums ===
#	Release date	Title	Label
1	May 1, 2009	林宥嘉香港迷宮演唱會 (Live)	HIM International Music
2	December 18, 2009	Sense Around Live	HIM International Music
3	February 5, 2013	Jazz Channel	HIM International Music
4	July 1, 2013	Yoga Lin Fugue World Concert Tour Live	HIM International Music
5	January 6, 2017	有時 The Great Yoga, 口的形狀:林宥嘉演唱會自選LIVE	HIM International Music
6	July 1, 2018	THE GREAT YOGA 演唱會數位Live精選	HIM International Music

=== Singles ===
- "That Very Song" ("那首歌")

Listed in the album Love Star's Reunion – Yesterday, Now and Tomorrow (愛星光精選˙昨天今天明天). This is Lin's first single and it was named one of the 2007 Top 13 Love Songs co-organized by KISS Radio and Apple Daily.

- "Shadow of Your Back" ("背影")

Listed in the soundtrack of Taiwan drama's Bull Fighting (鬥牛˙要不要), this is one of the theme songs in the drama. This melodic and romantic song tells the story about a guy who secretly loved a girl for a long time, but eventually chose to stay in the shadows of the girl because she did not reciprocate his love.

- "Legend" ("傳說")

A duet between Lin and Li Yang Liu (劉力揚), the latter shot to fame in the first season (2006) of the singing contest Super Girls (超級女聲) in China. Legend is the sub-theme of a Korean drama First King Four Gods (太王四神記) broadcast in Taiwan, starring the famous Korean TV and movie star, Bae Yong-joon (裴勇俊). This single has been digitally released.

- "The Gaze" ("眼色")

A musical-inspired song composed and written by Chinese singer-songwriter, Li Quan. This is also the opening song of Yoga's Trick Concert Tour and has been digitally released before the official release of Lin's Mystery Guest album.

- "Fly My Way"

The theme song for an online game endorsed by Lin in China. It is also featured as a bonus track in Lin's third album, Perfect Life.

- "Otomen" ("少女")

This song expresses the tender state of a man in love. It describes Lin's love story with his wife and his wife takes a starring role in the music video.

- "Flame in the Brook"("火焰小溪")

This song expresses the vision of the magical energy of the natural world. A little igniting seedling can burn a large area of grassland, and small streams can also converge into an ocean.

== Award and nominations ==
Year	Award	Category	Nomination	Result	Ref.
2008	IFPI Hong Kong Album Sales Awards	Top 10 Selling Mandarin Albums of the Year	Mystery Guest	Won	
2009	IFPI Hong Kong Album Sales Awards	Top 10 Selling Mandarin Albums of the Year	Senses Around	Won	
2009	HITO Radio Music Awards; HITO流行音樂獎	Top 10 Songs of the Year	"Mystery Guest"	Won	
2009	20th Golden Melody Awards	Best New Artist	Mystery Guest	Nominated	
2010	Metro Radio Mandarin Music Awards	Songs of the Year	"Fairy Tale"	Won	
2012	23rd Golden Melody Awards	Best Male Vocalist – Mandarin	Perfect Life	Nominated	
2013	24th Golden Melody Awards	Best Male Vocalist – Mandarin	Fiction	Nominated	
2017	28th Golden Melody Awards	Best Male Vocalist – Mandarin	Sell Like Hot Cakes	Nominated	

- 2007 Winner, One Million Star Season 1 (Taiwan)
- 2008 HITO FM Newcomer (with One Million Star Season 1 finalists) (Taiwan)
- 2008 Hong Kong Metro Broadcast Co. (新城電台): Best Newcomer, Hot Idol, Hot Idol Group
- 2008 Korea Asia Song Festival Newcomer (Asia Region)
- 2008 Singapore Hit Awards: Best Producer (Mystery Guest) Award, Newcomer Award, Annual Popular Artist Award and Annual Chart Winner
- 2008 8th Global Chinese Music Awards: Most Popular Newcomer, Top 20 Songs Award (The Gaze 眼色)
- 2008 YouthBox Music Awards: Best New Act, Best Album of the Year (Mystery Guest)
- 2008 Hong Kong TVB8 Best Newcomer, Gold
- 2008 Beijing Charts Best Newcomer of the Year (Taiwan-HK Region)
- 2008 Hong Kong Metro Radio Hits King of Newcomers (Overseas)
- 2008 Singapore Radio 100.3 Top 20 Songs (1st Admirer 伯樂)
- 2008 Singapore Radio 100.3 Top 10 Male Singers (2nd)
- 2008 Singapore Y.E.S. 93.3 FM Top 10 Most Popular Male Singers (4th)
- 2008 Singapore Y.E.S. 93.3 FM Top 100 Songs (6th – 伯乐, 25th – 神秘嘉宾)
- 2008 Sina Newcomers Music Presentation: Best Newcomer (Taiwan-HK Region)
- 2009 Sprite China Pop Music: Best Newcomer (Taiwan), Most "IN" Popularity Award (Internet)
- 2009 HITO Top Singles in 2008: 10th-Admirer 伯樂, 20th:Mystery Guest, 38th:The Gaze 眼色
- 2009 Guangdong Radio 101 Top Singles in 2008: 20th-The Gaze 眼色, 31st: Cruel Moonlight 殘酷月光
- 2009 HitFM Top 10 Albums in 2008 (Taiwan)
- 2009 The Association of Music Workers in Taiwan Top 10 Singles in 2008:The Gaze 眼色
