= Start from Here =

Start From Here

Studio album by Joanna Wang
- Released: January 11, 2008
- Genre: Pop, jazz, soul
- Label: Sony BMG Music Taiwan
- Producer: Bing Wang

Joanna Wang chronology
Start From Here (2008)	Joanna & Wang Ruo-lin / The Adult Storybook (2009)

Start From Here is the debut album by singer-songwriter Joanna Wang, released by Sony BMG Taiwan in January 2008. The album consists of two disks, featuring songs performed in English and Mandarin. It received mostly positive reviews and commercial success, with the sales of over 200,000 copies in Asia.

== Wang's rejection of the album ==
Despite the album's success, Wang herself strongly dislikes the album, and the label of "jazz singer" under which she became known in Taiwan, in the wake of the album's success. In a Reddit 'Ask Me Anything', she wrote:

At 17, I signed my first contract with Sony Music Taiwan, a decision I would soon have extremely mixed feelings - regret, fear, frustration, arousal, and sometimes hunger.

Long story short, the first two years was not what I expected and hoped for at all. After a lot of "no's, but's" and reluctant "yes's", at 19 I debuted with a shitastic record with the cheesiest and cliche 80's-esque music videos to very lame music that my label coerced me into singing [...]

== Track listing ==
=== Disc 1 (English) ===
1. "Let's Start From Here"
2. "Lost In Paradise"
3. "As Love Begins to Mend"
4. "Bada Bada"
5. "Lost Taipei"
6. "The Best Mistake I've Ever Made"
7. "I Love You" (David Tao)
8. "For No Reason"
9. "Stages of Flying"
10. "Now"
11. "True" (Spandau Ballet)
12. "New York State of Mind"

=== Disc 2 (Chinese) ===
1. "迷宮" (Mígōng, lit. maze; Mandarin version of Let's Start From Here)
2. "有你的快樂" (Yŏu Nĭ de Kuàilè, I Have Your Happiness; Mandarin version of Lost in Paradise)
3. "Now" (Mandarin version)
4. "因為你愛我" (Yīnwèi Nĭ Ài Wŏ, Because You Love Me; Mandarin version of As Love Begins To Mend)
5. "For No Reason" (Mandarin version)

== Sales ==
Region	Certification	Certified units/sales
Hong Kong	—	15,000
Taiwan	—	80,000
