= Jury Award (Golden Melody Awards) =

Taiwanese music award

The Golden Melody Jury Award (Chinese: 金曲獎評審團獎) is a Golden Melody Award presented by the Ministry of Culture of Taiwan, established in the 18th Golden Melody Awards in 2007 to honor an extraordinary body of work that the jury decides to be unique and exemplary. According to the Golden Melody Award, the award does not objectively judge under a set of criteria, but can only hand out the award if more than two-thirds of the jury decides to recognize the work after review and discussion. The award is not given if the jury does not meet a consensus.

At the 25th Golden Melody Awards, Taiwanese rapper Dwagie's "Refuse to Listen (不聽)" and Jonathan Lee's "Hills (山丘)" each received nine to nine votes from the judges. Since three judges abstained, it did not meet the consensus so the award was not given during the ceremony.

== Recipients ==
=== Jury Prize (18th-present) ===
Year	Performing Artist	Work	Evaluation	Ref.
2007	Not awarded			
2008	Not awarded			
2009	Li Shuang-tze	Salute! Sing Our Own Songs		
2010	Superband	North Bound - EP	North Bound combines the different styles and creative concepts of the four music stars, stirring up new tricks for four generations. Without dreams, music could not happen; a project that realized the dreams of 20 million people and touched the hearts of Chinese people all over the world. Each generation has their own mission and representative works, decades of common memories, and hundreds of songs about life. Through their singing, we were all inspired and motivated in our lives' own Superband.	
2011	Not awarded			
2012	Not awarded			
2013	O-Kai Singers	A Cappella	Without the use of musical instruments, O-Kai Singer's vocal aesthetics combine aboriginal language and A Capella to create new rhythmic melodies, and develop new vocabulary for pop culture and singing techniques. The exquisite and delicate recording not only has a deep sense of the times, and the popularity, but also conveys the message of aboriginal culture, which has set a new paradigm for Taiwan's pop music industry.	
2014	Not awarded			
2015	Not awarded			
2016	Not awarded			
2017	Sheng-xiang & Band	Village Besieged	Sheng-xiang & Band allows people to hear the real life, but also to feel the power from the roots of the land; the rigorous use of instruments, the literary connotation in the lyrics, and the broad and inclusive consideration of the sound. It's not just about listening to the present, it's about spreading hope in the music and waking up more people. Village Besieged is not just an album, but it is also a record for the sound of our times.	
2018	Not awarded			
2019	Joanna Wang	Modern Tragedy	Joanna Wang has maintained her own direction on the road of music creation and continued to break through the mainstream, creating new possibilities for other female creators. Her imagination and courage touched the whole jury.	
2020	G.E.M.	City Zoo	Two-thirds of the votes determine the winner of the award. While originality is encouraged, [the work] achieved great success both in sales and the younger market. It is a successful pop album and the perfect definition of the pop industry's Golden Melody Award; Standing at the peak of mainstream, but not reducing the sincerity to be the creative force that encourages creation that manifests learning. Flow and texture are balanced, and the work is complete and refined.	
2021	Wanfang	Dear All	Because of the pandemic that happened last year, many things changed and many people realized that life is not permanent, but what remains unchanged is that musicians work hard to make music. The album tries to convey a gentle message that the life of the singer and the quality of the production are perfectly integrated which is very precious in this era.	
2022	Ayugo Huang	Mountain of Doom	His outstanding performance amazed us, especially since the album has historical profundity and is soaring to heights, transcending language and ethnic boundaries.	
