= List of events at the Mercedes-Benz Arena (Shanghai) =

The arena hosted the Opening Ceremony of Expo 2010 on April 30 and Closing Ceremony six months later on October 31, 2010. It has since then been opened for a variety of events such as concerts, musical shows and sporting events soon after the conclusion of the event.

This is a list events held at the Mercedes-Benz Arena, Shanghai.

== Concerts ==
=== Mandarin/Cantonese ===
List of Mandarin/Cantonese events (featuring artists mainly from Mainland China, Hong Kong, Macau, and Taiwan) (Note: Some events listed below also feature international artists from Asian and Western countries.)
Date	Artists	Events
2010
November 19	Faye Wong (王菲)	王菲2010巡回演唱会
November 20	Faye Wong (王菲)	王菲2010巡回演唱会
November 26	Faye Wong (王菲)	王菲2010巡回演唱会
November 27	Faye Wong (王菲)	王菲2010巡回演唱会
November 28	Faye Wong (王菲)	王菲2010巡回演唱会
December 18	Elva Hsiao (萧亚轩)	WOW世界巡回演唱会
December 30	Jacky Cheung (张学友)	1/2世纪世界巡回演唱会
December 31	Jacky Cheung (张学友)	1/2世纪世界巡回演唱会
2011
January 1	Jacky Cheung (张学友)	1/2世纪世界巡回演唱会
January 2	Jacky Cheung (张学友)	1/2世纪世界巡回演唱会
January 3	Jacky Cheung (张学友)	1/2世纪世界巡回演唱会
May 14	Cheer Chen (陈绮贞)	夏季练习曲巡回演唱会
May 21	Show Lo (罗志祥)	舞法舞天世界巡回演唱会安可场
June 25	Fish Leong (梁静茹)	爱的那一页世界巡回演唱会
July 9	Lo Ta-yu (罗大佑)	恋曲2011
August 27	Christine Fan (范玮琪)	Love&FanFan世界巡回演唱会
October 29	Jane Zhang (张靓颖)	"我的模样"巡回演唱会
November 19	Khalil Fong (方大同)	15方大同Live in Shanghai
December 10	Na Ying (那英)	那20年世界巡回演唱会
December 16	Paula Tsui (徐小凤)	—N/a
December 17	Paula Tsui (徐小凤)	—N/a
2012
January 2	Wang Feng (汪峰)	Life Asks For Nothing 生无所求巡回演唱会
February 14	Fish Leong (梁静茹)	爱的那一页世界巡回演唱会
July 14	Jolin Tsai (蔡依林)	Myself世界巡回演唱会
July 28	Sodagreen (苏打绿)	"当我们一起走过"巡回演唱会
July 29	Sodagreen (苏打绿)	"当我们一起走过"巡回演唱会
August 18	Christine Fan (范玮琪)	Love&FanFan世界巡回演唱会
September 1	Sun Nan （孙楠）	世界巡回演唱会 - 上海站
October 20	Chris Lee (李宇春)	"疯狂世界"巡回演唱会
December 4	May Day (五月天）	—N/a
December 15	Jam Hsiao (萧敬腾)	有一种精神叫萧敬腾
2013
March 23	Yoga Lin (林宥嘉)	Yoga LIN FUGUE Concert Tour (神游巡回演唱会)
April 13	Show Lo (罗志祥)	Over the Limit (舞极限)世界巡回演唱会
May 17	Jay Chou (周杰伦)	摩天轮世界巡回演唱会
May 18	Jay Chou (周杰伦)	摩天轮世界巡回演唱会
May 19	Jay Chou (周杰伦)	摩天轮世界巡回演唱会
June 29	Chang Chen-yue (张震岳)	Bye Bye Blue Monday Concert Tour (艳阳天世界巡回演唱会)
July 13	S.H.E	2gether 4ever World Tour
September 11	Andy Lau (刘德华)	ALways中国巡回演唱会
September 12	Andy Lau (刘德华)	ALways中国巡回演唱会
September 13	Andy Lau (刘德华)	ALways中国巡回演唱会
September 14	Andy Lau (刘德华)	ALways中国巡回演唱会
September 21	Joanna Wang (王若琳)	
October 12	JJ Lin (林俊杰)	Time Line (时线)世界巡回演唱会
October 26	Chris Lee (李宇春)	WhyMe巡回演唱会
November 15	Disney on Ice: Treasure Trove (冰上迪士尼)	
November 16	Disney on Ice: Treasure Trove (冰上迪士尼)	
November 17	Disney on Ice: Treasure Trove (冰上迪士尼)	
November 23	Liu Sihan (刘思涵)	《拥抱你》2013巡回音乐会
November 30	Han Hong (韩红)	I love therefore I am (我爱我故演唱会)
December 14	Cheer Chen (陈绮贞)	时间的歌巡回演唱会
December 21	MC HotDog (姚中仁)	"我的时代"圣诞狂欢派对
2014
January 18	Wang Leehom (王力宏); Rebecca Ferguson; Samantha Jade	轩尼诗炫音之乐
February 14	Ding Dang (丁当)	—N/a
March 15	Jonathan Lee (李宗盛)	既然青春留不住世界巡回演唱会
April 29	—N/a	Turandot
April 30	—N/a	Turandot
May 2	—N/a	Turandot
May 10	Show Lo (罗志祥)	舞极限之舞魂再现世界巡回演唱会安可场
May 24	Samuel Hui (许冠杰)	世界多美好演唱会
May 31	Zhou Libo (周立波)	立波在上海脱口秀
June 7	Yoga Lin (林宥嘉)	口的形状巡回演唱会
June 14	Sodagreen (苏打绿)	10周年世界巡回演唱会
June 15	Sodagreen (苏打绿)	10周年世界巡回演唱会
June 21	Khalil Fong (方大同)	Soulboy Lights Up世界巡回演唱会
June 28	—N/a	虎牌啤酒乐队龙虎榜
July 4	G.E.M. (邓紫棋)	G.E.M.X.X.X Live世界巡回演唱会
July 5	G.E.M. (邓紫棋)	G.E.M.X.X.X Live世界巡回演唱会
July 6	G.E.M. (邓紫棋)	G.E.M.X.X.X Live世界巡回演唱会
July 11	—N/a	《我和吸血鬼有个约会》
July 12	—N/a	《我和吸血鬼有个约会》
July 13	—N/a	《我和吸血鬼有个约会》
July 18	—N/a	《我和吸血鬼有个约会》
July 19	—N/a	《我和吸血鬼有个约会》
July 20	—N/a	《我和吸血鬼有个约会》
July 12	S.H.E	2gether 4ever World Tour Encore
July 26	—N/a	白之黑跨界音乐会
July 27	—N/a	Artistry on Ice - Love Is Life (2014雅姿盛典 —— 爱一世)
August 2	—N/a	Video Games Live 2014电玩游戏音乐会
August 3	—N/a	《蝉心乐沐全国巡回视听演唱会》
August 3	—N/a	Nova Dance Party
August 16	Hacken Lee & Alan Tam (李克勤 & 谭咏麟)	左麟右李巡回演唱会
August 22	Li Yundi; Stan Lai	《大师殿堂》
August 23	Extreme Live 2014 (达芙妮极乐时尚派对)	
August 29	Cinderalla	
August 30	Cinderalla	
August 31	Cinderalla	
August 30	Michael Wong (光良)	回忆里的疯狂巡回演唱会
September 6	—N/a	《英雄联盟》 3周年庆狂欢盛典 —— 中国选拔赛
September 12	—N/a	《亿万歌迷怀念邓丽君大型演唱会》
September 12	—N/a	《人贱人爱》
September 13	—N/a	《人贱人爱》
September 14	—N/a	《人贱人爱》
September 19	—N/a	《人贱人爱》
September 20	—N/a	《人贱人爱》
September 21	—N/a	《人贱人爱》
October 1	—N/a	Universe Music Carnival 2014 (宇宙动漫音乐嘉年华演唱会2014)
October 2	—N/a	Universe Music Carnival 2014 (宇宙动漫音乐嘉年华演唱会2014)
October 3	—N/a	Universe Music Carnival 2014 (宇宙动漫音乐嘉年华演唱会2014)
October 18	Paula Tsui (徐小凤)	小凤姐徐小凤2014演唱会
October 20	—N/a	Shanghai International Music Festival 2014 (2014年上海国际音乐节)
October 21	—N/a	Shanghai International Music Festival 2014 (2014年上海国际音乐节)
October 22	—N/a	Shanghai International Music Festival 2014 (2014年上海国际音乐节)
October 23	—N/a	Shanghai International Music Festival 2014 (2014年上海国际音乐节)
October 24	—N/a	Shanghai International Music Festival 2014 (2014年上海国际音乐节)
October 25	—N/a	Shanghai International Music Festival 2014 (2014年上海国际音乐节)
October 26	—N/a	Shanghai International Music Festival 2014 (2014年上海国际音乐节)
October 23	—N/a	New Zealand Music Festival (新西兰音乐节)
October 25	Chiang Yu-Heng (姜育恒)	告别30巡回演唱会
November 1	—N/a	Halloween Party (万盛狂想祭)
November 8	Cheer Chen (陈绮贞)	时间的歌2014演唱会
November 14	Disney On Ice: Dare To Dream (冰上迪士尼)	
November 15	Disney On Ice: Dare To Dream (冰上迪士尼)	
November 16	Disney On Ice: Dare To Dream (冰上迪士尼)	
November 29	Jam Hsiao (萧敬腾)	Triple Jam 萧敬腾世界巡回演唱会
December 24	—N/a	兄弟本色上海圣诞狂欢派对
2015
January 9	Jonathan Lee (李宗盛)	既然青春留不住演唱会
January 28	—N/a	Lie To Me (别对我说慌)
January 29	—N/a	Lie To Me (别对我说慌)
January 30	—N/a	Lie To Me (别对我说慌)
February 1	—N/a	Lie To Me (别对我说慌)
February 14	Ding Dang (丁当)	丁当情人节演唱会
March 13	Fish Leong (梁静茹)	"你的名字是爱情"2015世界巡回演唱会
March 14	Fish Leong (梁静茹)	"你的名字是爱情"2015世界巡回演唱会
March 20	—N/a	A Night with Aretha Franklin starring Cherry Brown
March 21	—N/a	A Night with Aretha Franklin starring Cherry Brown
March 21	David Tao (陶喆)	The Glamorous Life 2015世界巡回演唱会
March 30	ERC Chinese Top Ten Awards (2015年东方风云榜颁奖典礼)	
April 11	JJ Lin (林俊杰)	时线Timeline：新地球Genesis-世界巡回演唱会
April 12	JJ Lin (林俊杰)	时线Timeline：新地球Genesis-世界巡回演唱会
April 28	Hebe Tien (田馥甄)	如果世界巡回演唱会
May 2	Wakin Chau (周华健)	今天唱什么世界巡回演唱会
Shinhwa (神话组合)	17th Anniversary Concert	
May 16	Zhou Libo (周立波)	2015周立波海派清口 ——《火红年代》立波在上海
May 27	William Chan (陈伟霆)	Fans Meet & Greet Session (粉丝见面会)
May 27	—N/a	Heart to Heart Shanghai (上海心连心)
June 6	—N/a	Miracle Super Concert in Shanghai (奇迹演唱会)
June 27	Jane Zhang (张靓颖)	BANG THE WORLD 全球巡回演唱会
June 27	—N/a	2015 Rock & Love Wildlife Charity Concert (2015年Rock & Love 保护野生动物国际青少年公益演唱会)
July 4	Bibi Zhou (周笔畅)	Boom！2015巡回演唱会
July 18	Jolin Tsai (蔡依林)	Play世界巡回演唱会
July 25	SNH48	第二届偶像年度人气总选举演唱会
July 28	—N/a	《星光盛典公益演唱会》
August 1	Wu Bai (伍佰)	无尽闪亮的摇滚全经典巡回演唱会
August 6	—N/a	Ice Age LIVE!
August 7	—N/a	Ice Age LIVE!
August 8	—N/a	Ice Age LIVE!
August 9	—N/a	Ice Age LIVE!
August 12	—N/a	Ice Age LIVE!
August 13	—N/a	Ice Age LIVE!
August 14	—N/a	Ice Age LIVE!
August 15	—N/a	Ice Age LIVE!
August 28	—N/a	Dream Town (梦境小镇之塔塔与火焰圣石)
August 29	—N/a	Dream Town (梦境小镇之塔塔与火焰圣石)
August 30	—N/a	Dream Town (梦境小镇之塔塔与火焰圣石)
September 5	A-Lin (黄丽玲)	A-Lin"声呐"巡回演唱会
September 12	Ada Liu (柳岩); Raymond Lam (林逸峯); Dick and Cowboy(朋克牛仔); Yisa Yu (郁可唯); Jeff Chang (张信哲); Li Ronghao (李荣浩); Jolin Tsai (蔡依林); David Tao (陶喆); Ingdzin Droma (韩红)	《上海举行演唱会》
September 13	—N/a	《喜欢你依贝子：一生一世演唱会》
September 14	—N/a	《喜欢你依贝子：一生一世演唱会》
September 26	Rene Liu (刘若英)	“我敢”2015世界巡回演唱会
October 16	—N/a	燃•音 — 经典动漫演唱会
October 17	—N/a	燃•音 — 经典动漫演唱会
October 17	Ekin Cheng (郑伊健); Jordan Chan (陈小春); Michael Tse (谢天华); Jerry Lamb (林晓峰); Chin Ka-lok (钱嘉乐)	《岁月友情演唱会》
October 18	—N/a	《功夫熊猫闯天下》
October 24	Pu Shu (朴树)	China Concert Tour (中国巡回演唱会)
October 31	—N/a	Happy Halloween Party (魔幻万圣总动员)
November 19	—N/a	世纪之恋 — 20世纪经典日剧回忆演唱会
November 20	—N/a	Disney On Ice: Magical Ice Festival (冰上迪士尼：魔幻欢乐季)
November 21	—N/a	Disney On Ice: Magical Ice Festival (冰上迪士尼：魔幻欢乐季)
November 22	—N/a	Disney On Ice: Magical Ice Festival (冰上迪士尼：魔幻欢乐季)
November 27	Wallace Chung (钟汉良)	Happy Birthday to Wallace (钟汉良生日会)
November 28	Angela Chang (张韶涵)	张韶涵2015《纯粹》世界巡回演唱会
December 5	Priscilla Chan (陈慧娴)	Back to Priscilla (陈慧娴30周年演唱会)
December 8	Jonathan Lee (李宗盛)	—N/a
December 8	Wang Changchang (王厂长)	音乐脱口秀
December 9	Wang Changchang (王厂长)	音乐脱口秀
December 10	Wang Changchang (王厂长)	音乐脱口秀
December 11	Wang Changchang (王厂长)	音乐脱口秀
December 12	Wang Changchang (王厂长)	音乐脱口秀
December 13	Wang Changchang (王厂长)	音乐脱口秀
December 14	Wang Changchang (王厂长)	音乐脱口秀
December 15	Wang Changchang (王厂长)	音乐脱口秀
December 16	Wang Changchang (王厂长)	音乐脱口秀
December 17	Wang Changchang (王厂长)	音乐脱口秀
December 12	Aska Yang (杨宗纬)	《带一首诗来演唱会》
December 19	Sun Nan (孙楠)	Sun Nan Live 2015 Concert (孙楠上海演唱会)
December 20	八三天	《绝对热血：挑战极限》上海演唱会
December 24	Chang Chen-yue (张震岳); MC HotDog (姚中仁); MJ116(顽童)	兄弟本色日落黑趴世界巡回演唱会
December 25	Magic Power (MP魔幻力量)	我们的主场
December 31	—N/a	爆笑喜剧 — 自拍女王
December 31	—N/a	2016 Dragon TV New Years Gala Countdown (东方卫视跨年倒数晚会2016)
2016
January 1	—N/a	爆笑喜剧 — 自拍女王
January 2	—N/a	爆笑喜剧 — 自拍女王
January 2	Wei Song (魏松); Dai Yuqiang (戴玉强); Wah Laun Mok(莫华伦)	China's Three Tenors 2016 Shanghai New Year's Concert(中国三大男高音 — 2016上海新年音乐会)
January 9	Li Jian (李健)	“”看见李健“2016巡回演唱会
January 16	Karen Mok (莫文蔚）	2015 - 2016 Karen Mok Regardez World Tour 《“看看” 世界巡回演唱会》
January 28	Zhang Hang(张行)	《回到80年代上海演唱会》
February 20	Wallace Chung (钟汉良)	Sing For Life 《 “”乐作人生“”巡回演唱会》
February 27	《2016年新年音乐祈福会 — 为爱祈福，让爱传递》	
March 19	Della (丁当)	《I Love You 我爱你练习曲演唱会》
March 28	—N/a	ERC Chinese Top Ten Awards (第23届东方风云榜音乐盛典)
April 10	—N/a	The White Magic Rabbit（韩国Oppa奇幻兔子秀）
April 23	Show Lo (罗志祥）	"Crazy World" World Tour (“疯狂世界”世界巡演）
April 30	Zhou Libo (周立波)	周立波想笑流百年之唱别人的歌说自己的笑话
May 14	Gary Chaw （曹格）	Gary Chaw 2016 World Tour（“我是曹格” 世界巡回演唱会)
May 21	Jolin Tsai (蔡依林)	Jolin Tsai 2016 Play World Tour (PLAY世界巡回演唱会)
May 28	—N/a	亚洲强音盛典
June 1	—N/a	国际马戏小丑六一嘉年华
June 2	—N/a	国际马戏小丑六一嘉年华
June 3	—N/a	国际马戏小丑六一嘉年华
June 4	—N/a	国际马戏小丑六一嘉年华
June 10	David Wong (王力)	魅力双语脱口秀 — 洋腔洋调
June 11	David Wong (王力)	魅力双语脱口秀 — 洋腔洋调
June 11	Chou Chuan-huing (周传雄)	“时不知归” 世界巡回演唱会
June 18	Ekin Cheng (郑伊健); Jordan Chan (陈小春); Michael Tse (谢天华); Jerry Lamb (林晓峰); Chin Ka-lok (钱嘉乐)	岁月友情上海演唱会
June 20	—N/a	Swan Lake (天鹅湖)
June 30	Jay Chou (周杰伦)	The Invincible "Jay Chou" Concert Tour ("地表最强"世界巡回演唱会）
July 1	Jay Chou (周杰伦)	The Invincible "Jay Chou" Concert Tour ("地表最强"世界巡回演唱会）
July 2	Jay Chou (周杰伦)	The Invincible "Jay Chou" Concert Tour ("地表最强"世界巡回演唱会）
July 3	Jay Chou (周杰伦)	The Invincible "Jay Chou" Concert Tour ("地表最强"世界巡回演唱会）
July 9	Li Ronghao （李荣浩）	An Ideal World Tour Concert （有理想世界巡回演唱会）
July 16	Lala Hsu （徐佳莹）	日全食巡回演唱会
July 23	—N/a	Bilibili Macro Link - Star Phrase
July 30	SNH48	第三届偶像年度人气总选演唱会
August 6	Wakin Chau（周华健）	2016 World Tour （“今天唱什么”上海再团圆场世界巡回演唱会）
August 13	Yoga Lin （林宥嘉）	THE GREAT YOGA 世界巡回演唱会
August 18	Lay（张艺兴）	Fans Meet & Greet Session（粉丝见面会）
August 20	Hebe Tien （田馥甄）	Hebe IF Concert Tour PLUS （“如果”巡回演唱会）
August 21	Hua Chenyu （华晨宇）	Hua Chengyu Mars Concert （华晨宇“火星”演唱会上海站 ）
August 27	Julian Cheung （张智霖）	Crazy Hours Live 2016 Concert
September 24	Twins	LOL World Tour
September 30	Priscilla（陈慧娴）	Priscilla-ism Shanghai Concert
October 15	Rene Liu (刘若英)	2016 刘若英 ”Renext“” 我敢世界巡回演唱会 Encore场
October 16	Rene Liu (刘若英)	2016 刘若英 ”Renext“” 我敢世界巡回演唱会 Encore场
October 22	Jason Zhang （张杰）	Sound of My Heart 我想
October 28	The Wonderful World of Disney On Ice(冰山迪士尼：奇幻之境)	
October 29	The Wonderful World of Disney On Ice(冰山迪士尼：奇幻之境)	
October 30	The Wonderful World of Disney On Ice(冰山迪士尼：奇幻之境)	
2017
June 10	Joker Xue (薛之谦)	薛之谦“我好像在哪见过你”巡回演唱会
June 17	Luo Tianyi (洛天依)	Vsinger Live 2017洛天依全像演唱会
2018
March 31	Fei Yu-ching (費玉清)	2018费玉清上海演唱会
May 5	Nine Percent	THX with LOVE Fanmeeting
May 6	Nine Percent	THX with LOVE Fanmeeting
2019
January 12	Rocket Girls 101	2019火箭少女101上海飞行演唱会-Power
February 23	Luo Tianyi (洛天依) Lang Lang (郎朗)	虚拟歌手洛天依&郎朗全息演唱会
March 30	Fei Yu-ching (費玉清)	费玉清2019告别演唱会
July 6	Lay Zhang	张艺兴2019大航海巡回演唱会

=== Japanese and South Korean ===
List of events featuring mainly Japanese and South Korean artists
Date	Artists	Events
2011
March 5	Super Junior	Super Show 3
2012
March 10	L'Arc-en-Ciel	20th Anniversary and world tour
April 14	Super Junior	Super Show 4
July 21	BIGBANG	Alive Galaxy Tour
2013
May 25	G-Dragon	One of a Kind World Tour
May 26	G-Dragon	One of a Kind World Tour
May 26	Shinhwa	Grand Tour: The Classic
July 20	TVXQ!	TVXQ! LIVE WORLD TOUR "CATCH ME" in Shanghai
July 28	Kim Junsu	Xia 2nd Asia Tour Concert Incredible
August 24	Super Junior	Super Show 5
December 23	BIGBANG	Superstarry Christmas
2014
March 22	G-Dragon; Crayon Pop	Simply K-Pop Tour
May 11	EXO	Meet & Greet Sessions
July 18	EXO	Exo from Planet #1 - The Lost Planet
July 19	EXO	Exo from Planet #1 - The Lost Planet
September 20	JYJ	The Return of The King Asia tour 2014
November 22	Lee Min-ho (李明镐)	2014 Global Tour (李明镐2014"重装上阵" 上海歌友演唱会)
December 20	Jin Akanishi (赤西仁)	Jindependence Tour 2014
2015
January 3	Girls' Generation (少女时代)	1st Fan Party [Mr Mr] in Shanghai
January 24	TVXQ (东方神起)	TVXQ! SPECIAL LIVE TOUR - T1ST0RY
February 7	Super Junior	Super Show 6
April 4	2PM	2PM World Tour: Go Crazy in Shanghai
May 9	Lee Soo-hyuk (李洙赫)	The First Affair - Fans Meet & Greet Session
May 9	Shinhwa (神话组合)	17th Anniversary Concert
May 30	Exo	Exo Planet #2 - The Exo'lusion
May 31	Exo	Exo Planet #2 - The Exo'lusion
June 19	BIGBANG	Made World Tour
June 20	BIGBANG	Made World Tour
June 21	BIGBANG	Made World Tour
August 21	—N/a	Running Man
August 29	Claudia Kim; Gong Hyo-jin; IU	搜狐视频《制作人》粉丝见面会
October 2	CNBLUE	2015 CNBLUE LIVE [COME TOGETHER]
October 6	Jin Akanishi	Live Tour 2015
2016
January 30	μ's Emi Nitta (高坂穂乃果 役 新田恵海); Aya Uchida (南ことり 役 内田彩); Riho Iida (星空凛 役 飯田里穂); Sora Tokui (矢澤にこ 役 徳井青空); Suzuko Mimori (園田海未 役 三森鈴子); Pile (西木野真姫 役 Pile)	Love Live!μ's Fan Meeting in Shanghai～live & talk～ (学园偶像计划粉丝见面主题嘉年华)
March 11	BIGBANG	Made V.I.P Tour
March 12 First	BIGBANG	Made V.I.P Tour
March 12 Second	BIGBANG	Made V.I.P Tour
May 24	Beast; Shinee; B1A4; T-ara	K-Pop & Supermodel Festival (2016韩娱季巅峰时尚天团演唱会)
September 17	T-ara	T-ara Great China Tour
November 22	One Ok Rock	ONE OK ROCK 2016 Live in Shanghai
2017
July 12	Radwimps	2017 Asia Live Tour in Shanghai
2018
October 14	Yoko Takahashi, et al.	KING SUPER LIVE 2018
December 1	Nogizaka46	NOGIZAKA46 LIVE in Shanghai 2018
2019
March 9	Kenshi Yonezu	Yonezu Kenshi 2019 Tour
April 14	Kana Hanazawa	Kana Hanazawa concert tour 2019
September 14	SawanoHiroyuki[nZk]	SawanoHiroyuki LIVE[nZk] in Shanghai 2019
October 25	Nogizaka46	NOGIZAKA46 LIVE in Shanghai 2019
October 26	Nogizaka46	NOGIZAKA46 LIVE in Shanghai 2019
November 11	Sekai no Owari	The Colors Asia Tour 2019

=== International (Other countries) ===
List of international events (Note: Artists on this list are mainly from the United States, United Kingdom, Canada, Australia, and European Union.)
Date	Artists	Events
2011
March 9	Eagles	Long Road Out of Eden Tour
March 13	Usher	OMG Tour
April 8	Quincy Jones	—N/a
August 21	James Blunt	—N/a
November 5	Akon	—N/a
2012
September 25	Maroon 5	Overexposed Tour
September 29	Booka Shade	—N/a
November 23	Elton Hercules John	40th Anniversary of the Rocket Man
November 24	Jennifer Lopez	Dance Again World Tour
2013
March 3	Adam Lambert	We Are Glamily Tour
March 24	The Beach Boys	—N/a
March 26	Simple Plan	Get Your Hearts On Tour
April 26	Yanni	—N/a
April 30	Andrea Bocelli	—N/a
May 7	Slash	Apocalyptic Love World Tour
August 13	Metallica	—N/a
August 14	Metallica	—N/a
August 16	Cirque du Soleil	Michael Jackson: The Immortal World Tour
August 17	Cirque du Soleil	Michael Jackson: The Immortal World Tour
August 18	Cirque du Soleil	Michael Jackson: The Immortal World Tour
August 20	Owl City	—N/a
August 21	Lindsey Stirling	—N/a
August 27	Pitbull	Global Warming Tour
October 3	The Killers	Battle Born World Tour
October 5	Justin Bieber	Believe Tour
November 10	Herbie Hancock (赫比·汉考)	—N/a
November 20	Alicia Keys	Set the World on Fire Tour
November 29	Nile Rodgers	Shanghai Electric Disco Carnival
November 30	The Cardigans	Modern Sky Festival 2013
December 7	Landau Eugene Murphy Michael Grimm	—N/a
2014
January 2	James Blunt	Moon Landing 2014 World Tour
February 21	Avril Lavigne	The Avril Lavigne Tour
March 7	Ed Sheeran	X Tour
March 12	The Rolling Stones	14 On Fire
April 3	Bruno Mars	The Moonshine Jungle Tour
April 8	Lionel Richie	All the Hits, All Night Long
April 12	André Rieu	—N/a
April 14	Alfredo Rodriguez	Live in Shanghai (The Invasion Parade)
May 30	Taylor Swift	The Red Tour
July 8	Jessie J (杰西)	Alive Tour
August 29	Cinderalla	
August 30	Cinderalla	
August 31	Cinderalla	
December 13	Megan Nicole (梅根·妮可)	The Escape Party
2015
	Avenged Sevenfold	Hail to the King Tour
January 13	Michael Bublé	To Be Loved Tour
March 17	Yanni (雅尼)	One Man's Dream World Tour 2015
March 20	Cherry Brown	A Night with Aretha Franklin starring Cherry Brown
March 21	Cherry Brown	A Night with Aretha Franklin starring Cherry Brown
April 7	Pitbull	2015 World Tour
April 21	Katy Perry	The Prismatic World Tour
April 22	Katy Perry	The Prismatic World Tour
May 16	Owl City(猫头鹰之城)	On The Verge Tour
May 17	Owl City(猫头鹰之城)	On The Verge Tour
September 21	Muse	Drones World Tour
November 10	Taylor Swift	The 1989 World Tour
November 11	Taylor Swift	The 1989 World Tour
November 12	Taylor Swift	The 1989 World Tour
2016
January 1	Richard Clayderman (理查德•克莱德曼)	2016 New Year Concert in China (浪漫中国 — 中国巡演2016上海新年音乐会)
January 5	Adam Lambert	The Original High Tour
April 26	Iron Maiden	The Book of Souls World Tour
August 2	Nick Vujicic (尼克胡哲)	2016 Nick Vujicic "Hero's Back" Public Speaking in Shanghai(“”英雄归来“2016尼克胡哲上海演讲会）
August 30	Simple Plan	Taking One For The Team Tour
August 31	Simple Plan	Taking One For The Team Tour
September 26	Queen + Adam Lambert	2016 Summer Festival Tour
2017
January 15	Metallica	WorldWired Tour
August 28	Ariana Grande	Dangerous Woman Tour
September 27	OneRepublic	16th Annual Honda Civic Tour
November 10	Pharrell Williams; Jessie J Maria Sharapova (Note: Among the international artists in the line-up of performers at the 11.11 Countdown Gala.)	Alibaba's 11.11 Countdown Gala
2018
January 17	Imagine Dragons	Evolve World Tour
April 4	James Blunt	The Afterlove Tour
April 20	Bruno Mars	24K Magic World Tour
April 21	Bruno Mars	24K Magic World Tour
April 23	Bruno Mars	24K Magic World Tour
May 2	Fall Out Boy	Mania Tour
September 18	Jessie J	R.O.S.E Tour
October 23	Sam Smith	The Thrill of It All Tour
October 24	Mariah Carey	The #1's Tour
October 31	Charlie Puth	Voicenotes Tour
2019
November 10	Taylor Swift	Alibaba's 11.11 Countdown Gala
2023
September 8	Westlife	The Wild Dreams Tour
September 9	Westlife	The Wild Dreams Tour
2025
November 24	Katy Perry	The Lifetimes Tour
November 25	Katy Perry	The Lifetimes Tour

== Sports ==
- October 13, 2013: NBA preseason game - Los Angeles Lakers vs Golden State Warriors
- October 9–10, 2015: 拳王之江湖 — 权力联盟
- October 14, 2015: NBA Pre-Season Game - Los Angeles Clippers vs Charlotte Hornets
- November 14, 2015: (Pac-12 basketball) - Washington vs Texas
- September 10, 2016: WWE Live 2016
- October 9, 2016: NBA Pre-Season Game - Houston Rockets vs New Orleans Pelicans
- September 21, 2017: NHL Pre-Season Game - Los Angeles Kings vs Vancouver Canucks
- October 8, 2017: NBA Pre-Season Game - Golden State Warriors vs Minnesota Timberwolves

== Other events ==
- November 1, 2014: 2014 Parinama Shanghai Open and WDC & WDC AL World Trophy and Work Ranking Series (第2届回向国际舞上海公开赛)
- June 25, 2015: Wild Star Press Conference
- August 25, 2015: 锤子科技2015夏季新品发布会
- October 31 - November 1, 2015: 2015 Parinama Shanghai Open(2015年WDC世界舞蹈锦标赛暨第三届回向国标舞上海公开赛)
- November 20, 2017: Victoria's Secret Fashion Show 2017
