= OK (Chang Chen-yue album) =

Studio album by Chang Chen-yue
- Released: July 6, 2007
- Genre: Mandopop
- Label: Rock Records
- Producer: Chang Chen-yue

Chang Chen-yue chronology
Goodbye (再見) (2005)	OK (2007)	Empty Handed (兩手空空) (2011)

OK is the ninth studio album by Taiwanese singer-songwriter Chang Chen-yue. It was released in 2007. The album marked a significant stylistic departure from Chang's previous alternative, electronic, and hard rock style into a more straightforward and melodic pop sound.

== Songs ==
The song "Missing is a Type of an Illness" is a cover of Chyi Chin's 1989 song of the same name. Chang additionally incorporated rap into the verses in his rendition and recruited singer Tanya Chua to duet together on the chorus.

Meanwhile, the title track "OK" was written to express Chang's feelings after his breakup with his partner Miranda Lu (路嘉怡).

== Track listing ==
No.	Title	Writer(s)	Length
1.	"Missing [you] is a Type of an Illness" (思念是一種病 feat. Tanya Chua)	Chang Chen-yue, Chyi Chin	4:15
2.	"You Said There is a Girl" (你說有個女孩)	Chang	4:09
3.	"Intersection" (路口)	Chang	3:55
4.	"Very Difficult" (很難)	Chang	4:18
5.	"OK"	Chang	4:08
6.	"Lonely Night Post" (孤獨的夜哨)	Chang	3:42
7.	"Goodbye" (再見)	Chang	3:30
8.	"Small Space" (小宇)	Chang	3:47
9.	"Let This Song" (就讓這首歌 Featuring MC HotDog and Patty Hou)	Chang, MC HotDog	3:47
10.	"Small Star" (小星星 Featuring 阿里山桃花村姐妹)	Chang	4:49
11.	"Goodbye (pathos version)" (再見 (真情版))	Chang	4:31

- Note : The album does not provide English titles; the titles are approximate translations.
