= Tai Ke =

Taiwanese cultural term

Tai Ke (Chinese: 臺客) was originally a derogatory term used when the waishengren in Taiwan held certain discrimination against the benshengren (early settlers of the Taiwanese people). Today, the term is sometimes used to describe behaviors which are considered inappropriate, crude, unethical, or those that show disregard to others, but has been embraced by people who identify specifically as Taiwanese, and not part of an elite ruling class from outside of Taiwan imposing their own standards of behavior on the local population.

Some stereotypes of a Tai-Ke include dressing inappropriately at formal occasions, chewing and spitting betel nuts and modifying cars. With the spread and development of mass media, Tai-Ke has been deliberately portrayed as a local sub-culture trend.

There are no specific or fixed set of characteristics, behavior or group that makes a Tai-Ke since fashion and lifestyle trends are always changing.

== History ==
=== Early history ===
In early days, the term originated from the dialect of a certain Taiwan military dependents' village to describe lower-class and uneducated native Taiwanese. Tai-Ke was also used to describe people who were disliked, even if they did not possess the above-mentioned characteristics.

Initially, the term was only used by some adolescents of the Taiwan military village. Hence, when they entered the Taiwan working society, they did not dare to use the term in public and in the media since the term was not widely known or recognized by the Taiwanese. Even people from fellow military dependents' village might not know about the word due to different locations of the villages or variances in upbringing. It was not until the late 1990s when several celebrities from the Mainland such as Dee Shu began publicly using the term on television programs to describe people who were "low-class". The term then began gaining popularity in the mass media.

=== 1990s ===
In May 1999, indie band LTK Commune published a Rock Taiwanese album named "台客的復仇 / Taik's Eye for an Eye". The album reflects the issues of Taiwan protest movement and environmental pollution in rural areas. Even though their album title literally means "Taike's Revenge", none of their songs in the album bore the album's name. Even though this album did not gain much attention and popularity in mass media, it can be considered as the time of the rising of civic society. The time when Tai-kes began reflecting on their self-identity as well as on the meaning of life in Taiwan.

In the late 1990s, Kevin Tsai hosted a TVBS-G television show called "Super Generation" to promote the significance of the term "Tai-Ke" and discuss its changing definitions. In the program, representatives of tai-ke were invited as guests of the show. During which, the tai-ke represents were mostly cooperative and even entertained all the typical stereotypes that they were labelled with. At times, they would even fiercely rebut any false accusations. This television show was one of the earliest television show to present and promote the Tai-kes publicly. However, the effect of this show can said to be paradoxical. On one hand, some of the negative image of Tai-kes were intensified but on the other hand, the show gained immense popularity as viewers found it entertaining.

Because of the advantages of mass media, the term became more prevalent among young people. In addition to the terms "vulgar," "not of standard" that were synonymous to Tai-ke, the term became increasingly of mixed meanings.

The television show "Super Generation" also introduced the term "Tai Mei" that bore the same meaning of "Tai-Ke", only to describe the female versions. However, some scholars and the public believe that these words that appear in the media would reflect that there is ethnic discrimination, so they resisted the term. Thus in July 2005, Taiwanese publishing company "Eslite Spectrum" issued its 56th magazine that highlighted the spread of the "Tai-Ke" term and phenomenon.

=== 2000s ===
In August 2005, a few Taiwan artists such as Wu Bai, MC HotDog, Chang Chen-yue, Show Lo saw the potential in the term Tai-Ke, and held a rock concert to`gather the support of the younger generations Taiwanese to portray a new meaning to the word.

Jutoupi, Bobby Chen and other celebrities who consider themselves "very tai-ke" artists, together with entertainer Stanley Huang were sponsored by China Broadcasting Corporation and other media companies to perform a rock concert in Taipei International Conference Hall. Stanley Huang thought it was a wonderful "Taiwan Rock" concert; in April 2006, there was another rock carnival held in Taichung which included pole dancing, floats and other electronic erotic performances.

After this series of events, some people think that the word "Tai-ke" gradually lost its derogatory meaning, but instead, became a kind of "self-derision" term. They felt that people called themselves "very tai" to self-ridicule or to signify someone who was not "in-trend".

In 2005, China Broadcasting Corporation set off a rock concert, and organized a "Tai-ke big vote-off" event. Jacky Wu won first place, Dee Shu came in second, and Jay Chou was third place. Subsequently, the media recognized that the "Tai-ke" term has gone off the stigma and instead has become widely popular.

=== 2010s ===
The rise of Taiwanese nationalism, de-Sinicization, and the Democratic Progressive Party led to the reappropriation of the term "Tai-ke."

In 2014, Taiwanese singer Jeannie Hsieh said,

"In Taiwan, we don't have Girls' Generation and we don't have Lady Gaga. Foreigners eat hamburgers; we eat gua bao. Foreigners drink smoothies; we eat tshuah-ping. We are the masters of this land. We should say we are blessed to be living in Taiwan. We are proud to be living in Taiwan. If you live in Taiwan, then you are a Tai-ke. Who says Tai-ke is unbecoming? I say Tai-ke is the mainstream. Who says Tai-ke is low-class? I say Tai-ke is super high class. Tonight, we're going to tell you that Tai-ke is fashionable. Tai-ke is sexy. Tai-ke is cosmopolitan. Tonight, we're going to prove that Tai-ke is dope. Tai-ke is swagger. Am I Tai? I'm very Tai."

== Tai-Ke trademark dispute ==
In 2007, the two terms "Tai-ke" and "Tai-ke rock" was registered as a trademark by Neutron Innovation (BVI) Ltd who held the rock concert. They received the permission from ROC Ministry of Economic Affairs Intellectual Property Office. This caused the East Coast Hot Rock festival which was supposed to be held in Hualien on August 4, with the theme "Taike Rock Night" to be forced to be renamed into "East Coast Rock Night." This incident aroused cultural dissatisfaction and questions from the academic circles. LTK Commune's lead singer, Ko Ren-Chien as well as legislator Lin Shu-fen openly opposed the word "Tai-ke" to be registered as a trademark. The neutron innovative companies sponsored its first rock carnival "eliminate stigma of tai-ke" to appeal to the community to maintain respect for their brand value; but because such a cultural expression was registered as a trademark, it created great controversy.

On 10 September 2007, CEO Zhang Peiren of the neutron innovation company, announced that the company will abandon the "Tai-ke" trademark and will consider cancelling their subsequent rock concert. Consequently, Taiwanese singer, Chang Chen-Yue who has previously performed in the rock concerts held by Neutron Innovation Ltd expressed his displeasure. He felt that "Previously, nobody cared about the Tai-ke culture. It was the rock concerts that advocated it. Those politicians and scholars did not support us and even looked at us with discrimination. However, now that tai-ke gained popularity they rose up against our trademark. It is very unreasonable."

== See also ==
- Racism
- Reappropriation – Valuing a formerly pejorative term in esteem
