= Jonathan Lee (musician) =

Taiwanese singer and producer

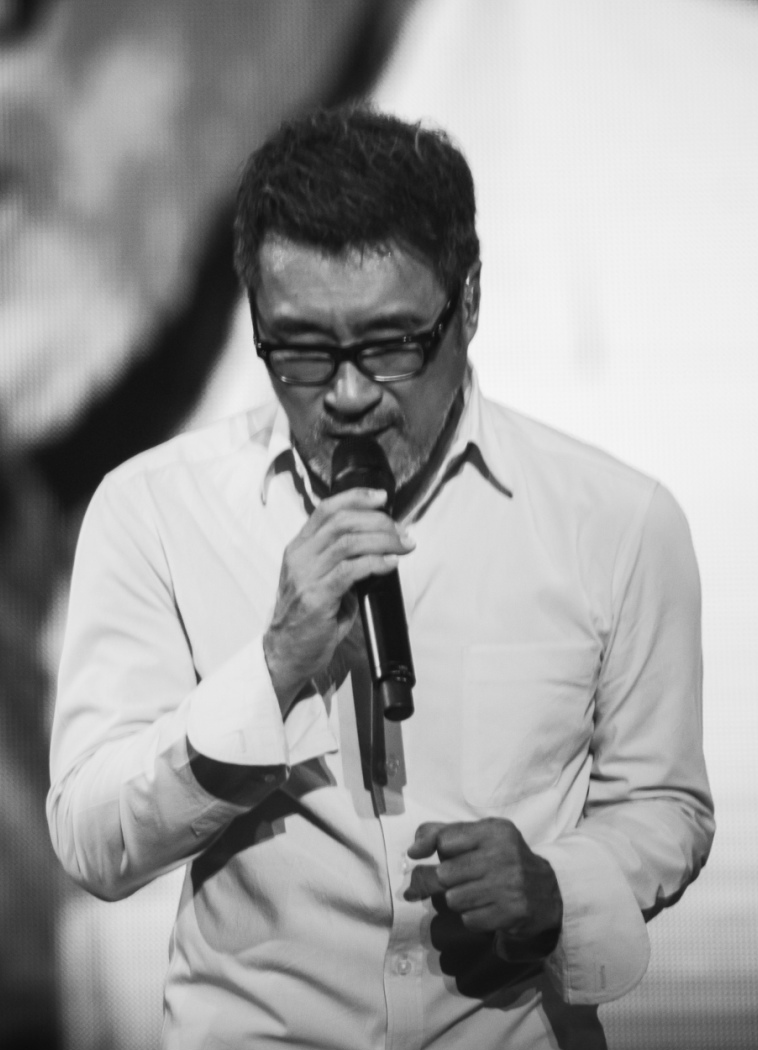
- Lee in 2014
- Born: 19 July 1958 (age 68); Beitou, Taipei, Taiwan
- Occupations: Record producer, singer, songwriter
- Years active: 1979–present
- Spouses: Rosita Chu (m. 1988; div. 1997) Sandy Lam (m. 1998; div. 2004)
- Children: 3
- Awards: Golden Melody Awards – 3rd GMA (1991) – Best Album Producer; 12th GMA (2001) – Best Album Producer; 21st GMA (2010) – Judges Award; 22nd GMA (2011) – Best Lyricist; 22nd GMA (2011) – Best Composer; 22nd GMA (2011) – Song of the Year; 25th GMA (2015) – Best Album Producer; 25th GMA (2015) – Song of the Year
- Musical career
- Also known as: Lee Chung-shan
- Genres: Mandopop
- Instruments: Guitar, piano
- Labels: Rock Records, B'in Music

Jonathan Lee Chung-shan (Chinese: 李宗盛; pinyin: Lǐ Zōngshèng; born 19 July 1958) is a Taiwanese musician and producer. He is regarded as one of the most influential and respected figures in the world of Mandopop music.

== Life and career ==
Lee began his career in the music industry during the 1970s, during Taiwan's popular "campus folk song" era. He was a member of the "Wood Guitar" band. In 1983, Lee made his debut as a music producer for the album Light Rain Just Comes in Time by Zheng Yi, which became an instant hit. The eponymous single "Light Rain Just Comes in Time" ranked No. 1 for 13 consecutive weeks on Taiwan's main music chart; the first single "End", a duet with Yvonne Jeng, written, composed and sung by Lee, also became a huge hit.

In 1984, Lee joined Rock Records, and has been credited with catapulting Rock Records into one of the foremost independent music labels in Asia. He helped pave the way for the golden era of Chinese pop music in the 1990s and 2000s, during which he wrote and produced many classic hits popular until today, setting impressive sales records, plus winning numerous accolades, such as Sarah Chen's "Dream to Awakening" (夢醒時分), Jackie Chan's "The Sincere Hero" (真心英雄), Wakin Chau's "You Make Me Happy and Sad" (讓我歡喜讓我憂), Jeff Chang's "Love is Like Tidal Wave" (愛如潮水), Sandy Lam's "It Doesn't Matter Who I Am" (不必在乎我是誰), Winnie Hsin's "Understanding" (領悟), Karen Mok's "Overcast" (陰天), and many more, which have all been hugely popular. As such, Lee has been hailed as the "million-dollar" producer, and deemed as the Godfather of Mandopop music, reaching and touching hundreds of millions of Chinese-speaking music fans around the world. He has been and remains one of the most successful and sought-after record producers in Chinese pop music scene. Given his iconic status in the Chinese music world, Lee's songs have influenced artists across Asia.

More than music production, Lee has also been involved in movie theme songs and OST projects, and having collaborated with many famous directors, including Hou Hsiao-hsien, Sylvia Chang, Jackie Chan, Chen Kaige, plus others.

In 2002, he founded his own guitar brand "Lee Guitars", and has been personally involved in the design and production of hand-made guitars ever since.

In 2009, Lee formed "Superband" with three other popular artists from Rock Records: Wakin Chau, Luo Dayou and Chang Chen-yue.

Lee also occasionally produces solo albums for himself and have recorded duets with many artists. His own songs "Jonathan's Song" in 2011 and "Hills" in 2013, both won "Song of the Year" and "Best Lyricist" awards at the 22nd and 25th Taiwan Golden Melody Awards respectively.

From 2013 to 2015, Lee embarked on his Even If Youth Is Never Lasting world tour, which kicked off in Taiwan, then toured on to China, Singapore, Malaysia, Australia, the U.S., and U.K., etc., covering dozens of cities around the world, including two consecutive performances at Lincoln Center in New York, a first for a Chinese-speaking musician. He also held a concert at the famed Royal Albert Hall in London, also a first for a musician from Taiwan.

Lee also served as Chief A&R Consultant for Sony Music in Greater China from 2013 to 2016. In addition, Lee was also a driving force in introducing the renowned Blue Note Jazz Club to Beijing, China. In September 2016, Lee was joined by famous American jazz pianist and composer Chick Corea, for the grand opening of Blue Note in Beijing. His hope is to introduce the great American jazz music and culture, plus the many great jazz musicians, to the Chinese-speaking world.

In September 2017, it was announced that the Tony-winning Signature Theatre in Arlington, Virginia, will help develop "Road to Heaven: The Jonathan Lee Musical", an original Chinese musical — in both Mandarin and English, based on music written by Lee. Adapted from the novel by Li Xiuwen, the original musical will feature music by Lee with English lyrics by Tony Award winner Richard Maltby Jr. (Ain't Misbehavin', Miss Saigon, Fosse) and a book by John Dempsey (The Pirate Queen, The Witches of Eastwick). The musical will then be translated back into Chinese for a world premiere in Shanghai in 2018. English-language productions are also planned for New York and other cities throughout the U.S. following the Chinese premiere.

== Discography ==
=== Key productions ===
Year	Album	Artist
1983	Light Rain Just Comes in Time 小雨來的正是時候	Zheng Yi
1984	Rock'n Roll Stage 搖滾舞台	Xue Yue
1985	Busy and Blind 忙與盲	Sylvia Chang
1986	New Love/Old Love 舊愛新歡	Michelle Pan
1987	Direction of the Heart 心的方向	Wakin Chau
1988	Heart of a Woman 女人心	Sarah Chen
1989	Talk to You, Listen to You 跟你說 聽你說	Sarah Chen
1991	The First Time 第一次	Jackie Chan
1993	Worrying 心事	Jeff Chang
1994	Understanding 領悟	Winnie Hsin
1995	Scar 傷痕	Sandy Lam
1999	Growing Up 一夜長大	Fish Leong
2000	Twelfth Floor 十二樓	Karen Mok
2001	Day Lilies 忘憂草	Wakin Chau
2002	Princess-D OST 想飛OST	Various
2004	20/30/40 OST 女人二十三十四十OST	Various
2009	North Bound (EP) 縱貫線北上列車EP	Superband
2010	Go South (EP) 縱貫線南下列車EP	Superband
2011	Pure 原色	Aska Yang
2014	What's Next 接下來是什麼	Ann Bai
2017	Still An Outlander 仍是異鄉人	Li Jianqing

=== Discography ===
Year	Album
1986	The Spirit of Life 生命中的精靈
1989	Works of Jonathan Lee 1984–1989 李宗盛作品集
1993	2 X Man Life / Jonathan Lee & Lowell Lo 李宗盛＆盧冠廷／我們就是這樣
1994	Reluctantly 李宗盛的音樂旅程-不捨

=== Film theme songs/score productions ===
- 1983 Growing Up
- 1983 The Boys from Fengkuei
- 1984 Ah Fei
- 1987 Listen to Me
- 1991 Sisters of the World Unite – nominated for Hong Kong Film Awards "Best Original Film Score”
- 1992 Police Story 3: Super Cop
- 1992 Three Summers
- 2014 Dream Flight

=== Television theme songs productions ===
- 1991 Farewell (TV drama) – theme song / TTV (Taiwan Television Enterprise)
- 1991 Eternal Love Like Ocean (碧海情天) (TV drama) theme and ending credit songs – "Ordinary Man" (凡人歌) and "Eternal Love Like Ocean"/TTV
- 1992 The Last Emperor (TV drama) theme song – "Infatuation"/TTV
- 1993 Young Heroes (TV drama) theme song – "Happy Like Gods"/TTV
- 1993 Happy Building (TV drama) theme and ending credit songs/CTS (Chinese Television System)
- 1994 Chivalry Under the Blue Sky (TV drama) ending credit song/TTV
- 1996 The New Longmen Roadhouse (TV drama) ending credit song/TTV

=== Songs for advertisements/commercials ===
- 1986 Little Cook Instant Noodles – Beef Flavor
- 1987 Laurel Frozen Dumpling
- 1989 Sprite and Coca-Cola
- 1990 PECOS Soy Milk
- 1991 FUJI COLOR Fuji Films
- 1992 Yamaha Corporate Song
- 1992 China Airlines
- 1992 Paolyta-B (energy drink)
- 1993 HeySong Sarsaparilla Drink
- 1993 BMW
- 1993 Maxwell House Coffee
- 1999 Suntory Whisky
- 2016 Apple China – Send you a Spring Festival Song

== Filmography ==
=== Film ===
- 1983 Growing Up 小畢的故事
- 1983 The Boys from Fengkuei 風櫃來的人
- 1984 Ah Fei 油麻菜籽
- 1985 My Favorite Season 最想念的季節
- 1986 The Lock of Hearts 心鎖
- 1987 Listen to Me 我有話要說
- 1988 Friendly Shock (Yaya) 天崩地裂

=== Television ===
- 1985 What/TTV
- 1990 Sunday Fever – Apocalypse (variety show)/TTV

== Concerts ==
- 2006–2009 Sense and Sensibility World Tour (11 Shows)
- 2009–2010 Superband World Tour (58 Shows)

== Radio programs ==
- Talking Past Each Other – Host / Taiwan PBS (Police Broadcasting Service) – nominated for Taiwan's Golden Bell Awards for "Popular Music Radio Program" and "Best Radio DJ"
- Appointment After Dusk – Host / PBS
- Musician – Host / i like radio (Broadcasting Corporation of China) – won Golden Bell Awards Best Radio DJ Award

== Awards and nominations ==
Year	Award	Category	Nominated work	Result
1991	3rd Golden Melody Awards	Best Album Producer	Marching Forward – Lin Chung	Won
1997	Singapore Hit Awards	Best Lyricist	"Infatuation"	Won
1997	Singapore Hit Awards	Outstanding Musician of the Year		Won
2001	12th Golden Melody Awards	Best Album Producer	Twelfth Floor – Karen Mok	Won
2001	The Association of Music Workers in Taiwan Awards	Ten Best Album of the Year	Twelfth Floor – Karen Mok	Won
2001	The Association of Music Workers in Taiwan Awards	Ten Best Songs of the Year	Twelfth Floor – Karen Mok	Won
2003	5th CCTV-MTV Music Awards (China)	Special Outstanding Contribution in Music Award		Won
2011	The Association of Music Workers in Taiwan Awards	Ten Best Songs of the Year	"Jonathan's Song"	Won
2011	22nd Golden Melody Awards	Best Lyricist	"Jonathan's Song"	Won
2011	22nd Golden Melody Awards	Best Composer	"Jonathan's Song"	Won
2011	22nd Golden Melody Awards	Song of the Year	"Jonathan's Song"	Won
2012	The Association of Music Workers in Taiwan Awards	Ten Best Album of the Year	Pure – Aska Yang	Won
2012	The Association of Music Workers in Taiwan Awards	Ten Best Songs of the Year	Pure – Aska Yang	Won
2014	The Association of Music Workers in Taiwan Awards	Ten Best Songs of the Year	"Hills"	Won
2014	25th Golden Melody Awards	Best Album Producer	Hills	Won
2014	25th Golden Melody Awards	Song of the Year	Hills	Won
2018	29th Golden Melody Awards	Best Lyricist	"Hometown" (from Still An Outlander)	Nominated
2018	29th Golden Melody Awards	Best Album Producer	Still An Outlander	Won
