= Chang Chen-yue =

Taiwanese musician (born 1974)

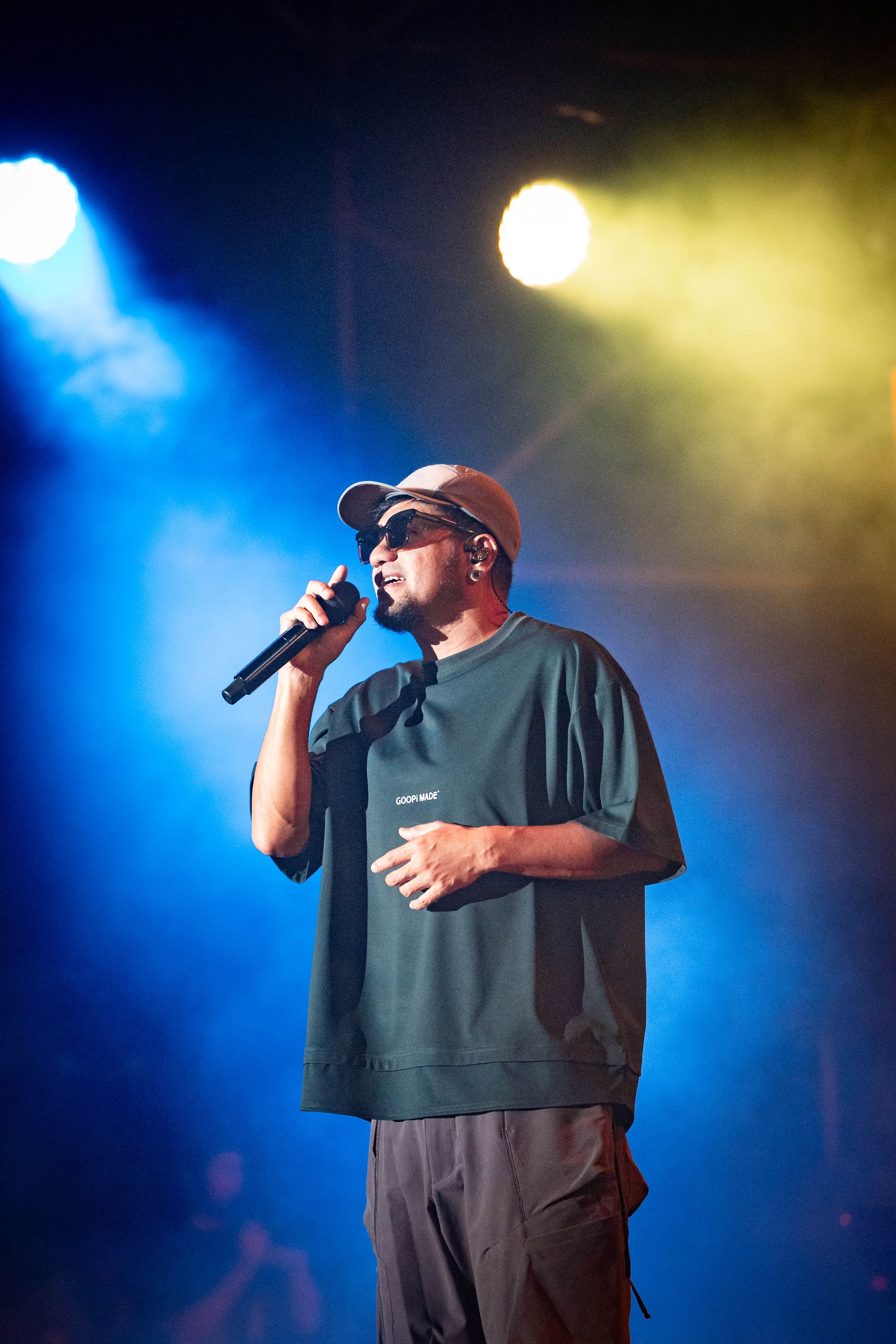
- Chang in 2024
- Born: Ayal Komod; 2 May 1974 (age 52); Su'ao, Yilan County Taiwan
- Occupations: Singer; songwriter; DJ; actor; guitarist; band member
- Years active: 1993–present
- Spouse: Sawu Koyouan
- Children: 1

Chinese name
- Traditional Chinese: 張震嶽
- Simplified Chinese: 张震岳
Transcriptions
Standard Mandarin
- Hanyu Pinyin: Zhāng Zhènyùe
Southern Min
- Hokkien POJ: Tiuⁿ Chìn-ga̍k
- Musical career
- Origin: Taiwan
- Genres: Mandopop, Rock, Dance, Hip-Hop
- Instruments: Vocals; guitar; bass; drums
- Labels: Rock Records, Forward Music, Universal Music, Pony Canyon, Magic Stone, True Color
- Website: truecolor.mu/artist/ayalkomod

Ayal Komod (born 2 May 1974), better known by his stage name A-Yue or Chang Chen-yue (Chinese: 張震嶽; pinyin: Zhāng Zhènyùe; Wade–Giles: Chang Chen-yue; Pe̍h-ōe-jī: Tiuⁿ Chìn-ga̍k), is an aboriginal Taiwanese rock and Hip-Hop musician, singer-songwriter and guitarist, and the frontman of his band, Free Night, also known as Free9. He is most widely known for his 1998 hit song "Ai Wo Bie Zou" (Love me, don't go). His 2013 album I am Ayal Komod won Best Mandarin Album at the 25th Golden Melody Awards. His 2025 album Go With The Flow won him Best Mandarin Male Singer, Best Mandarin Album and Best Composer at the 37th Golden Melody Awards.

Chang is a Taiwanese aborigine of the Amis people.

== Life and career ==
Chang was in the church choir as a child, which made him interested in music at a young age. He learnt to play the guitar in his middle school years and was gradually exposed to rock music.

Chang released his first album I Just Like You (就是喜歡你) with labels Pony Canyon and Magic Stone in 1993 before following up with the album Have the Flowers Opened Yet?, with Taiwanese label Rock Records. Chang released his third and fourth albums This Afternoon is Very Boring (1997) and Secret Base (1998) with Magic Stone. The song Love Me, Don't Go from Secret Base was a massive hit in Mainland China and Taiwan. Both albums made the China Times Top 10 Albums list for 1998 and 1999 respectively. Chang crossed into Hip hop music in a collaboration with rapper MC HotDog in the song Wo Yao Qian from the album Secret Base. Chang appeared in Wan Jen's 1998 film Connection by Fate (超級公民), which was shown at the 55th Venice International Film Festival and won the Special Jury Prize and Netpac / Fipresci Award at the 12th Singapore International Film Festival.

In December 2000, Chang released the album Trouble, it was awarded Top 10 Albums by Chinese Music Media Awards. He released albums Orange and Orange 2 in April and July 2001 respectively, as well as changing his name to DJ Orange. Chang released his eighth album One Of These Days with Rock Records in 2002. In 2004, Chang released the album Useless Guy which included a complication of his most popular songs as well as new songs Heaven, I Will Miss You, and Useless People. Chang founded his own record label True Color in 2004 and released his first extended play Drunk (2005) with the label. Chang released an additional EP Goodbye in July 2005 with Rock Records.

Chang released his ninth studio album OK in July 2007. For his album he was awarded as the eighth best mandarin male artist by chinese tabloid Southern Metropolis Daily. He collaborated with singer Tanya Chua in the hit song "Missing You is a Type of Illness" (思念是一种病) from the album. The song was written by Chang and singer-songwriter Chyi Chin. Chang also collaborated with fellow rapper MC HotDog and Taiwanese TV anchor Patty Hou on the song Small Star. In 2008, Chang created the band Superband along with Jonathan Lee, Wakin Chau, and Lo Ta-yu. The band's first EP North Bound (2010), won the Jury Award at the 21st Golden Melody Awards. In their second 2010 EP, Go South, the song Give Me My Own Song was awarded as the Best Song of The Year at the 22nd Golden Melody Awards. They disbanded later that year after finishing all tours.

Chang released his 10th studio album I am Ayal Komod in July 2013. His album was awarded the Best Mandarin Album during the 25th Golden Melody Awards. In 2015, he joined the Hip-Hop band 兄弟本色G.U.T.S., with rapper MC HotDog, E-SO, and Xiao Chun. The band is known for their hit song "Fei Tai Yuan"(FLY OUT). In 2017, he appeared as one of the judges alongside Kris Wu, Will Pan, Jane Zhang, and GAI. in the rap competition show, The Rap of China. The show had reached 1.3 billion views in a little over a month. Chang reappeared as one of the judges for seasons 2 and 3 of the show from 2018-2019, but did not reappear for season 4. He released his fourth EP Gone Away in October 2019.

== Controversy ==
At the Tai Ke Rock Concert in August 2005, Taiwanese musician Chang Chen-yue performed the racist and misogynistic rap "The Invasion of the Korean Wave" attacking actor Bae Yong-joon, Korean groups Clon and H.O.T., female Taiwanese musicians Yuki Hsu, A-Mei, and Coco Lee, and the Korean Wave in general.

== Discography ==
List of albums and EPs (collect)
Name	Mandarin	Year	Type	Label(s)
I Just Like You	就是喜歡你	1993	Album	Pony Canyon, Magic Stone
Have the Flowers Opened Yet?	花開了沒有	1994	Album	Rock Records
This Afternoon is Very Boring	這個下午很無聊	1997	Album	Magic Stone
Secret Base	秘密基地	1998	Album	Magic Stone
Trouble	有問題	2000	Album	Magic Stone
Orange	ORANGE電子音樂專輯	2001	Album	Magic Stone
Orange 2	ORANGE電子音樂專輯2	2001	Album	Magic Stone
One Of These Days	等我有一天	2002	Album	Magic Stone, Rock Records
Useless Guy	阿嶽正傳]	2004	Album	Rock Records
Drunk	馬拉桑	2005	EP	True Color
Goodbye	再見	2005	EP	Rock Records
OK	OK	2007	Album	True Colors, Rock Records
Empty Handed	兩手空空	2011	EP	Rock Records
Perplexed	我想要的感覺	2011	Album	N/A
I am Ayal Komod	我是海雅谷慕	2013	Album	Rock Records
Gone Away	遠走高飛	2019	EP	Rock Records
Go With The Flow	跟著感覺走	2025	Album	Rock Records

=== Personal period ===
==== Studio album ====
preliminary	The album name	issue date	Record company	Remarks	Repertoire
1st	I Just Like You	1 July 1993	Zhen Yan office; Pony Canyon: Reissued by Magic stone in 1998		==== Repertoire ==== : 1. I Just Like You(就是喜欢你); 2. My heart is beating for you(我的心是为你跳); 3. Miss your mood(想你的心情); 4. Listen to music loudly(大声听音乐); 5. Crying song(哭之歌); 6. City Paradise return ticket(城市天堂去回票); 7. sea(海); 8. The river that only flows on Sunday(星期天才流动的河); 9. Go for a walk(出去走走); 10. Hate summer(讨厌夏天); 11. April Fool's Day(愚人节那天); 12. Gospel(福音)
2nd	Have the Flowers Opened Yet?	23 June 1994	Rock Records		==== Repertoire ==== : 1. Have the Flowers Opened Yet?（花开了没有？）; 2. fragile（脆弱）; 3. Small request（小小要求）; 4. I like to fly（我喜欢飞翔）; 5. Naughty family（顽皮家族）; 6. Growing up is troublesome（长大是件麻烦的事）; 7. meet by chance（不期而遇）; 8. How are you (你好不好); 9. My heart, my love (我的心, 我的爱); 10. Really by the sea (真的在海边); 11. Angel island (天使之岛)
3rd	This Afternoon is Very Boring	1 October 1997	Magic stone	Won the top ten albums of "China Times" in 1998; Won the top ten Chinese musicians exchange association albums	==== Repertoire ==== : 1. The person who broke up（分手的人）; 2. Pickup Artists（把妹）; 3. First experience of love（爱的初体验）; 4. Are you going to wait for me（你会等我吗？）; 5. change（改变）; 6. Stop falling in love（不要再谈恋爱）; 7. This Afternoon is Very Boring（这个下午很无聊）; 8. How to do（怎么办）; 9. Fellow learners（同学会）; 10. secret（秘密）; 11. drink（喝酒）
4th	Secret Base	1 December 1998	Magic stone	Won the top ten albums of "China Times" in 1999	==== Repertoire ==== : 1. I want money（我要钱）; 2. Free Night; 3. Break up（分手吧）; 4. courage（勇气）; 5. Love you me him（爱情你我他）; 6. One Night Stand; 7. Love me do not go（爱我别走）; 8. God sister（干妹妹）; 9. See you 300 times（看你300回）; 10. free（自由）; 11. Love don't stop（爱不要停摆）; 12. forgive（原谅）; 13. First experience of love -Let's Do Cha-Cha Mix （爱的初体验）
5th	Trouble	5 December 2000	Magic stone		Repertoire: 1. nonsense（放屁）; 2. over thinking（想太多）; 3. There was no way out at the beginning（一开始就没退路）; 4. Intro; 5. Trouble; 6. In the early morning（在凌晨）; 7. dreaming（做梦）; 8. bitch couple（狗男女）; 9. 0204 I 10. 0204 II; 11. Intro; 12. go away（离开）; 13. World Harmony（世界大同）; 14. Walk to the end（走到底）
6th	Orange	1 April 2001	Magic stone		Repertoire: 1. Winter afternoon sun(冬天下午的太阳); 2. Robot walking（机器人走路）; 3. be lazy（偷懒）; 4. Sando King（山道王）; 5. Breeze and perfume（微风香水）; 6. stop（停）; 7. Trouble Remix
7th	Orange 2	July 2001	Magic stone		Repertoire: 1. Don't Give A Damn About Me!; 2. Frog Courtship（青蛙求偶记）; 3. Words from friends（朋友的话）; 4. good weather（好天气）; 5. hide（隐藏）; 6. Sink（沉没); 7. Need to work hard(要用力)
8th	One Of These Days	1 September 2002	Magic stone, Rock Records		Repertoire: 1. All over again（一切再重来）; 2. Surrender（认输）; 3. autumn and winter（秋天冬天）; 4. man（男子汉）; 5. only friends（只是朋友）; 6. Leilei（蕾蕾）; 7. Breeze and perfume（微风香水）; 8. One Of These Days（等我有一天）; 9. Smelly man（臭男人）; 10. Hands in pockets（双手插口袋）
9th	OK	6 July 2007	Rock Records	Won the "Southern Metropolis Daily" 8th Chinese Music Media Awards Best Mandarin Male Singer	Repertoire: 1. Missing is a disease (思念是一种病); 2. You said there is a girl (你说有个女孩); 3. intersection (路口); 4. Difficult (很难); 5. OK; 6. Lonely Night Watch (孤独的夜哨); 7. Goodbye (再见); 8. Xiaoyu (小宇); 9. Just let this song (就让这首歌); 10. little stars (小星星); 11. Goodbye -True Version (再见-真情版)
10th	I am Ayal Komod	5 July 2013	Rock Records	Best Mandarin Album at the 25th Golden Melody Awards; Won the top ten Chinese musicians exchange association albums/Single (Broken Guitar)	Repertoire: 1. Sports car and tank (跑车与坦克); 2. Broken guitar (破吉他); 3. Go a little slower (走慢一点点); 4. Let's do this first (先这样吧); 5. Disappear in your world (消失在你的世界里); 6. Ouch (唉唷喂呀); 7. on duty off duty (上班下班); 8. There is the sea in front of my house (我家门前有大海); 9. Don't cry, Abby (别哭小女孩); 10. Hugging you (抱着你); 11. Nameless love song (无名的情歌)

=== EP ===
EP name	issue date	Record company	Repertoire
Malasun (Drunk)	7 May 2005	Rock Records	Repertoire: 1. Malasun; 2. MODEL(妈抖); 3. Let me punch 4. Malasun（Clean version）
Goodbye	8 July 2005	Rock Records	Repertoire: 1. Goodbye; 2. Mountain Little Love Song; 3. Girl on the hill
Empty-handed (两手空空)	4 March 2011	Rock Records	Repertoire: 1. OK 2010; 2. Empty-handed（两手空空）; 3. The feeling i want（我想要的感觉）; 4. one day（有一天）; 5. Blues
Fly Away (远走高飞)	18 October 2019	Rock Records	Repertoire: 1. drunkard 2. bear in mind constantly（念念不忘）; 3. absolute 4. greedy（贪心）; 5. fly away（远走高飞）

=== Featured ===
Featured Album Name	issue date	Record company	Repertoire
Rock Records Hong Kong Golden Decade Collection- Chang Chen-yue	March 2003	Hong Kong Rock Records	Repertoire: 1. First experience of love（爱的初体验）; 2. I want money（我要钱）; 3. Break up（分手吧）; 4. Love me do not go（爱我别走）; 5. secret（秘密）; 6. change（改变）; 7. free（自由）; 8. Love don't stop（爱不要停摆）; 9. There was no way out at the beginning（一开始就没退路）; 10. In the early morning（在凌晨）; 11. courage（勇气）; 12. God sister（干妹妹）; 13. This Afternoon is Very Boring（这个下午很无聊）; 14. bitch couple（狗男女）; 15. Free Night
Useless Guy (阿岳正传)	24 June 2004	Rock Records	Repertoire: 1. I will miss you（我会想念你）; 2. courage（勇气）; 3. Bye-Bye; 4. Love me do not go（爱我别走）; 5. Don't say love me (不要说爱我); 6. God sister（干妹妹）; 7. heaven（天堂）; 8. Reluctant（舍不得）; 9. The love i give（我给的爱）; 10. secret（秘密）; 11. Useless People (Silenced Version)（无路用的人(消音版)）; 12. I want money（我要钱）; 13. Free Night; 14. First experience of love（爱的初体验）; 15. Break up（分手吧）; 16. How to do（怎么办）; 17. free（自由）; 18. 0204; 19. over thinking（想太多）; 20. In the early morning（在凌晨）; 21. There was no way out at the beginning（一开始就没退路）; 22. Surrender（认输）; 23. change（改变）; 24. nonsense（放屁）

== Filmography ==
=== Film ===
- 1998: Connection by Fate (超級公民), directed by Wan Jen
- 2008: Missing (深海尋人), directed by Tsui Hark

=== Variety and reality show ===
- 2022: Call Me by Fire (season 2) (披荊斬棘)

== Awards and nominations ==
Award	Year	Category	Work	Result	Ref.
Golden Melody Awards	2000	Best Composer	"Wo Gei De Ai" (我給的愛)	Nominated	
Golden Melody Awards	2008	Best Lyricist	"Love Sickness" (思念是一種病)	Nominated	
Golden Melody Awards	2010 (as Superband)	Song of the Year	"Desperado" (亡命之徒)	Nominated	
Golden Melody Awards	2010 (as Superband)	Best Lyricist	"Desperado" (亡命之徒)	Nominated	
Golden Melody Awards	2010 (as Superband)	Best Band	North Bound (北上列車)	Nominated	
Golden Melody Awards	2010 (as Superband)	Jury Award	North Bound (北上列車)	Won	
Golden Melody Awards	2011 (as Superband)	Song of the Year	"Jonathan's Song" (給自己的歌)	Won	
Golden Melody Awards	2011 (as Superband)	Best Arranger	"Jonathan's Song" (給自己的歌)	Nominated	
Golden Melody Awards	2014	Best Composer	"Missed Call" (未接來電)	Nominated	
Golden Melody Awards	2014	Best Mandarin Album	I am Ayal Komod (我是海雅谷慕)	Won	
Golden Melody Awards	2014	Best Mandarin Male Singer	I am Ayal Komod (我是海雅谷慕)	Nominated	
Golden Melody Awards	2020	Best Mandarin Male Singer	Gone Away (遠走高飛)	Nominated	
Golden Melody Awards	2026	Best Mandarin Album	Go With The Flow (跟著感覺走)	Won	
Golden Melody Awards	2026	Best Mandarin Male Singer	Go With The Flow (跟著感覺走)	Won	
Golden Melody Awards	2026	Best Composer	"Surfer's Love Story" (浪人的…)	Won	
Golden Melody Awards	2026	Song of the Year	"Surfer's Love Story" (浪人的…)	Nominated	
Golden Melody Awards	2026	Best Lyricist	"Mama's Eyes" (媽媽的眼睛)	Nominated	
