= Jerry Lo =

American singer (born 1972)

Jerry Lo (Chinese: 羅百吉; pinyin: Luó Bǎijí; born November 19, 1972, Los Angeles, California), known professionally as DJ Jerry, is a singer, songwriter and DJ of hands up, hard trance, hip-hop and house, who was popular in Taiwan in the 1990s and the 2000s (especially 2006).

== Life and career ==
Having immigrated from the United States to Taiwan at the age of 17, he was one of the first American born Taiwanese singers to become famous in Taiwan, along with the L.A. Boyz. During the late 1990s, he changed his style into electronic music and started going by the name of DJ Jerry. His techno and hip hop beats made him a prolific producer in the Taiwanese music scene, producing tracks for L.A. Boyz, Jutoupi, and other artists before releasing a debut solo techno album in 1994.

He has composed music for commercials such as 7-Eleven and the Japanese station NHK. He also has recorded in Madonna's studio with producer John Freyer.

He separated from his first wife, Lin Yihui, in 1997 after six years of marriage, having two daughters with her. He later remarried and had a son and another daughter.

In 2011, Lo tested positive for drugs, but the police later clarified it was due to the use of drugs by other people around him in a club. Nevertheless, the damage this did to his reputation caused him and his family to move back to the United States. Although he could have earned 10 times what he did in Taiwan, he only DJed for one show in 2013 and moved back to Taiwan in October 2016. His wife and children had returned earlier due to homesickness and to ensure the kids would learn Chinese.
