= Lee Mao-shan =

Taiwanese singer and television host

- Born: 11 April 1960 (age 65); Taiwan
- Occupation(s): Singer, television host
- Years active: 1979–present
- Musical career
- Origin: Taiwan
- Genres: Mandopop; Hokkien pop
- Instrument: Vocals
- Labels: Rock Records; Suria; Suwah Media; Synco Cultural

Chinese name
- Traditional Chinese: 李茂山
- Simplified Chinese: 李茂山
Transcriptions
Standard Mandarin
- Hanyu Pinyin: Lǐ Màoshān
Yue: Cantonese
- Jyutping: Li3 Mao4 Shan1
Southern Min
- Hokkien POJ: Lí Bōo-san

Lee Mao-shan (Chinese: 李茂山; pinyin: Lǐ Màoshān; born 11 April 1960) is a Taiwanese singer and television host.

At 19, Lee won first place in a singing competition in 1979. He released his debut album in 1984. Lee won a Golden Melody Award in 1991, followed by a Golden Bell Award in 1993. He left Taiwan in 1999, to avoid gambling debts, and settled in Malaysia and Singapore.
