= Taiwanese hip-hop =

Music genre or scene

Taiwanese hip-hop music started in the early 1990s, popularized by the early hip-hop trio L.A. Boyz. A distinctive style of rap emerged using Taiwanese Hokkien as opposed to the Mandarin Chinese used in Mandopop, which before democratization the regime actively promote the use of Mandarin and suppressing the use of Taigi.

== Cultural context ==
A mid-70s movement titled the Modern Folksong Movement sought to reclaim hip-hop for the Taiwanese people. Artists such as Yang Xian and Li Shuangz inspired a new generation of localization of music which strove to strip away the years of American cultural imperialism, which at the time, the United States was supporting Taiwan as Cold War ally. This movement paved the way for more Taiwan-specific music and allowed for new Taiwanese to take from local traditions and language and create their own national music.

== Early years: Harlem Yu ==
The first Mandarin rap song was performed by singer-songwriter Harlem Yu in Taiwan, who is known for being one of the first artists to experiment with R&B and rap in the Mandopop music industry in the early 1980s, which was parallel to the early New York 1980s rap songs.

== 1990s: L.A. Boyz ==
L.A. Boyz is a Taiwanese pop/rap group composed of two brothers and their cousin. They were raised in Irvine, California, and met at its University High School. They first became involved in music through their interest in hip-hop dance moves learnt from parties around Orange County and Los Angeles, and fashion from Compton and South-Central LA. Their dancing, and entry into various competitions, eventually led them to be scouted by a representative of Pony Canyon, in Taiwan. They released 10 albums, starting from their first, SHIAM! 閃 which sold more than 130,000 copies in 1992. Their second album, released the same year, was similarly received. The group was very successful in the 1990s until their break-up. They are credited for starting the trend that would spread into Taiwan and the rest of the Mandarin-speaking world.

== 2000s to 2010s ==
In 2001, MC HotDog arrived in the Taiwanese market. He is known for his use of explicit lyrics in his songs. He is known for his two famous hits, "我的生活" (My Life) and "韓流來襲" (The Korean Invasion).

In 2002, Dwagie released Lotus from the Tongue (舌粲蓮花), regarded as the first full rap album in the Chinese-speaking world.

Since then, many Taiwanese rappers have emerged, including Jae Chong, Machi, Leo Wang, Soft Lipa, and Nine One One. Women are a minority in Taiwanese hip-hop. Meredith Schweig wrote in 2010 that "there are no professional female MCs on the island" other than Miss Ko, who was regarded as a "newcomer" at the time.

== 2018-Present ==
The moment that the Golden Melody Awards granted an award to both Leo Wang and Soft Lipa announced the official arrival of Taiwanese hip-hop into the mainstream. In addition to being recognized in general pop-music circles, in 2021, MTV received a subsidy from the Ministry of Culture's Film, Television and Pop Music Industry Bureau to produce "The Rappers". The judges were Dwagie, Kumachen, Razor Jiang, and Leo Wang. This show is aiming to broaden the audience for Taiwanese hip-hop, and season 2 is set to premiere in January 2022.

== The Four major Taiwanese rap labels ==
=== 1. Kung Fu Entertainment.（人人有功練） ===
Founded by Dwagie in 2003. In the beginning, it was a community of friends gathering to promote hip-hop culture. Its regular members include Dwagie, JY, RPG, BR, Kumachan, and Professor H, all of whom are engaged in music production, performances, teaching, and cultural promotion.

=== 2. KAO!INC.（顏社） ===
Founded in July 2005, KAO!INK's Founder Dila Pang, aimed to promote Chinese rap music and create a brand new rap hip-hop music label in Taiwan. KAO!INK has since cultivated many rappers through various means, including Soft Lipa, Gordon, DJ Didilong, Jerry Li, DJ JIN.

=== 3. AINOKO ENTERTAINMENT.（混血兒娛樂 ） ===
Co-founded by 911 and Right Eye in 2015. It has been successful in recruiting artists such as Monkey, 187 INK and others who have worked together in the past, but has also signed up various artists from the new generation of hip-hop groups like: Cocky Boyz, Cautun Boyz and BCW. AINOKO ENTERTAINMENT continues the "Taichung Love" inherited by the predecessor TTM, and also allows the vitality of Taichung hip-hop to continue to spread.

=== 4. True color.（本色音樂） ===
Established in 2004, It was co-founded by George, and the singer A-Yue. True Color promotes itself as being a champion for Chinese hip-hop pop music. Some of the members which they work for include MC HotDog, and MJ116 (also individually as E.SO, Kenzy, and Muta). In 2015, True color formed a group of its artists together to begin a world tour, and after the world tour, True Color felt that it had contributed to the expansion of the influence of hip-hop within the mainstream music industry of Taiwan.

== Artists ==
- L.A. Boyz
- Jerry Lo
- JY
- MC HotDog
- TriPoets 參劈
- （草屯囝仔）
- （臭屁嬰仔）
- （蛋堡）
- （國蛋）
- （曾瑋中）
- DJ MR.GIN
- Donbay
- Dwagie
- Machi
- Manchuker（滿人）
- MJ116 （頑童）
- 911
- Miss Ko
- Jay Chou
- Leo Wang

== See also ==
- Music of Taiwan
