= Jutoupi =

- Also known as: Zhu Yuexin, Jutopi
- Genres: Mandopop, Cantopop, Taiwanese hip hop
- Occupation(s): Singer, songwriter, actor
- Instrument: Guitar
- Labels: Rock Records

Chinese name
- Traditional Chinese: 豬頭皮
- Simplified Chinese: 猪头皮
Transcriptions
Standard Mandarin
- Hanyu Pinyin: Zhūtóupí
Southern Min
- Hokkien POJ: Tu-thâu-phê

Alternative Chinese name
- Traditional Chinese: 朱約信
- Simplified Chinese: 朱约信
Transcriptions
Standard Mandarin
- Hanyu Pinyin: Zhū Yuēxìn
Southern Min
- Hokkien POJ: Chu Iok-sìn

Jutoupi (sometimes Jutopi; Chinese: 豬頭皮; pinyin: Zhūtóupí, birth name Ju Ywe-hsin or Zhu Yuexin; Chinese: 朱約信; pinyin: Zhū Yuēxìn; born February 1966) is a Taiwanese pop artist who brought a new musical style to Asia in 1994. Through his Funny Rap album series, Jutoupi focused on difficult topics, such as sex and political issues, through a mixture of Mandarin, Taiwanese, and English. His subsequent switch to dance/aboriginal music mixes was not well received by his fan base.

== History ==
Ju Ywe-hsin or Zhu Yuexin (朱約信) was born sometime in February 1966 in Tainan. He was inspired by father's position and upbringing in the Presbyterian Church in Taiwan, known for its liberal and dissenting positions, and would later become a deacon himself. At the beginning of his music career, he was known as the "Bob Dylan of Taiwan" as he traveled around the country with his guitar to take part in social and political movements. In 1994, he joined Rock Records, a Taiwanese record label founded in 1980 by Sam and Johnny Duan. At Rock Records, Ju / Zhu changed his image by producing punk/rock style, fused with a range of Taiwanese and Western styles and adopting the confrontational name Jutoupi, a homophonic pun on his surname that means pigheaded.

Jutoupi's first record, Funny Rap I: You Sick Suck Nutz Psycho Mania Crazy taipei City (or Jotoupi's Funny Rap, Chinese: 我是神經病; pinyin: Wǒ shì shénjīngbìng, transl. I'm Insane; Rock Records/Mandala Works, Taiwan, 1994) was part of a set of three Funny Rap albums. Jutoupi's Funny Rap focused on difficult topics, such as sex and political issues, through a mixture of Mandarin, Taiwanese, and English. It also exhibited creative, frenzied use of Taiwanese Mandarin, particularly stigmatized sociolects, as well as Taiwanese Hokkien and other languages (Hakka, Bunun, English, Japanese and French) with samples taken from various genres. State-backed TV and radio stations did not play the album, but it sold 50,000 copies, accredited to the media frenzy around Jutoupi himself as well as work of mouth.

Funny Rap I was followed by Happy New Year (Mandala Works, Taiwan), ROC on Taiwan (Magic Stone, Taiwan), and Hexi de Yewan O A A (Rock Records/Magic Stone, Taiwan). Hexi de Yewan represented a jump from rap music based on Taiwanese society to house music based on the society and culture of Taiwanese indigenous peoples. Noted as the first mainstream album in Taiwan featuring indigenous music, each song contains dance music mixed with music sampled from one tribe. Jutoupi's subsequent switch to dance/aboriginal music mixes was not well received by his fan base.

While some audiences did not consider his music hip hop at the time, seeing his work as more of an "interesting" amalgamation of various genres including Taiwanese folk and Japanese pop music, he has been credited by later artists as a major influence on local hip hop music and aesthetics.
