= 25th Golden Melody Awards =

Taiwanese music awards ceremony in 2014

- Date: 28 June 2014 (Popular music); 9 August 2014 (Traditional music)
- Location: Taipei Arena, Taiwan
- Hosted by: Harlem Yu (Popular music)

Television/radio coverage
- Network: TTV

The 25th Golden Melody Awards (Chinese: 第25屆金曲獎) were held in Taipei, Taiwan in 2014. The award ceremony for the popular music categories was broadcast on TTV on 28 June and was hosted by Harlem Yu.

== Winners and nominees ==
Below is the list of nominees and winners. Winners are highlighted in bold.

=== Popular music categories ===
==== Song of the Year ====
- **Hill (山丘) – Hill (山丘) – Jonathan Lee**
  - Battle Array Song (入陣曲) – The Best of 1999-2013 (步步自選作品輯) – Mayday
  - Gypsy In Memory (流浪者之歌) – Songs of Transience (時間的歌) – Cheer Chen
  - This Is Because We Feel Pain (這是因為我們能感到疼痛) – This Is Because We Feel Pain (這是因為我們能感到疼痛) – Tizzy Bac
  - Sister (姐姐) – Sister (跳針舞曲2013) – Jeannie Hsieh

==== Best Mandarin Album ====
- **I am Ayal Komod (我是海雅谷慕) – Chang Chen-yue**
  - Model (模特) – Li Ronghao (李榮浩)
  - Classic (拾光) – Li Jian (李健)
  - Recreate (你所不知道的杜振熙之內部整修) – Soft Lipa (杜振熙/蛋堡)
  - Jianghu (江湖) – Wakin Chau

==== Best Taiwanese Album ====
- **Sam Tsap Thong (30 出頭) – Chen Jian Wei (陳建瑋)**

==== Best Hakka Album ====
- **Heart Land – Yachun Asta Tzeng (曾雅君)**

==== Best Aboriginal Album ====
- **To & From the Heart (歌，飛過群山) – Taiwu Children's Ancient Ballads Troupe**

==== Best Female Mandarin Singer ====
- **Penny Tai – Unexpected** (純屬意外)
  - Faith Yang – Zero
  - Denise Ho – Coexistence (共存)
  - Tanya Chua – Angel & Devil (天使與魔鬼的對話)
  - JiaJia (紀家盈/家家) – Alone The Way (為你的寂寞唱歌)

==== Best Male Mandarin Singer ====
- **JJ Lin – Stories Untold**
  - Li Ronghao (李榮浩) – Model (模特)
  - Chang Chen-yue – I am Ayal Komod (我是海雅谷慕)
  - Soft Lipa (杜振熙/蛋堡) – Recreate (你所不知道的杜振熙之內部整修)
  - Wakin Chau – Jianghu (江湖)

==== Best Male Taiwanese Singer ====
- **Chen Jian Wei (陳建瑋) – Sam tsap thong (30出頭)**

==== Best Female Taiwanese Singer ====
- **Huang Yee-ling (黃乙玲) – By Your Side (惦在你身邊)**

==== Best Hakka Singer ====
- **Yachun Asta Tzeng (曾雅君) – Heart Land**

==== Best Aboriginal Singer ====
- **Anu Kaliting Sadiponga (阿努．卡力亭．沙力朋安) – cepo’混濁了**

==== Best Band ====
- **Mixer (麋先生) – Circus Movement (馬戲團運動)**
  - ChthoniC (閃靈樂團) - Bu Tik (武德)
  - The Chairman (董事長樂團) - One Life (一條命)
  - Fire EX. (滅火器) - Goodbye You!th
  - Tizzy Bac - Fragile Objects (易碎物)
  - Sodagreen (蘇打綠) - Autumn: Stories (秋：故事)
  - Funky Brothers (放客兄弟) - Funky Brothers

==== Best New Artist ====
- **Li Ronghao (李榮浩) – Model (模特)**
  - Jacky Chen (陳建瑋) - Sam Ts'ap Tho'ng (30 出頭)
  - Simhanada (師子吼) - 1/84000
  - Funky Brothers (放客兄弟) - Funky Brothers
  - Xiao Ren (小人) - Kiddo Kingdom (小人國)
  - Koala Liu (劉思涵) - Embrace (擁抱你)

==== Best Group ====
- **Light Engine (光引擎) – Scenes Along the Way (沿途風景)**

==== Producer of the Year (Album) ====
- **Penny Tai – Embrace You (擁抱你), released by Koala Liu (劉思涵)**

==== Producer of the Year (Single) ====
- **Jeffrey Kung (孔令奇), Derek Nakamoto – Old School (老派戀情), released by Jeffrey Kung (孔令奇)**

==== Best Lyrics ====
- **Jonathan Lee – Hill (山丘), sung by Jonathan Lee**

==== Best Composition ====
- **Debbie Hsiao (蕭賀碩) – Musicians, sung by Shuo & Cool Humor**
  - Chang Chen-yue – Missed Call (未接來電), sung by Faith Yang
  - Tizzy Bac – This Is Because We Feel Pain (這是因為我們能感到疼痛), sung by Tizzy Bac
  - Jonathan Lee – Hill (山丘), sung by Jonathan Lee
  - Suming (舒米恩) – In a Rush (很趕), sung by Suming
  - Penny Tai – Fortunate One (僥倖者), sung by Koala Liu (劉思涵)

==== Best Arrangement ====
- **Zhao Zhao (趙兆) – Wind in the Rye (風吹麥浪), for Li Jian (李健)**

==== Best Instrumental Album ====
- **Tseng Tseng Yi (曾增譯) – Symbiosis (曾增譯共聲体三重奏)**

==== Producer of the Year (Instrumental) ====
- **Lu Sheng Wen (呂聖斐) and Dong Shun Wen (董舜文) – 4, released by Timeless Fusion Party (無限融合樂團)**

==== Best Instrumental Composition ====
- **Tseng Tseng Yi (曾增譯) – Symbiosis (大稻晚霞)**
  - Tommy Fish (余昶賢) – Sunset On an Old City (共聲体)
  - Gu Zhongshan (顧忠山) – The Insigator (起哄者)
  - Ricky Ho (何國杰) – Abundance of Life (生命。樂章)
  - Baobu Badulu (保卜) – Signal Fire (狼煙)

==== Best Music Video ====
- **Nan-hong Ho (何男宏) - Gypsy in Memory (流浪者之歌), sung by Cheer Chen**

==== Best Album Design ====
- **Yung-Chen Nieh (聶永真) - Hill (山丘), released by Jonathan Lee**

==== Lifetime Contribution Award ====
- **Peng Kuo-hua (彭國華)**

== Performers ==
Performers for the popular music category ceremony:

Artist(s)	Segment
Harlem Yu	This is Music
Jason Mraz; JJ Lin	Cross Over
Crowd Lu; William Wei; Van Fan; Victor Wong; Li Ronghao (李榮浩)	Tribute to past winners of the Best Male Mandarin Singer award
Su Rui	The Same Moonlight
Sangpuy (桑布伊); Hsieh Yu-Wei (謝宇威); Xiao Huang-Chi; Chung Xin Ming (鍾興民)	The Land
A-Lin	Queen of Golden Melody
Jam Hsiao	Everlasting Love
Li Ronghao (李榮浩)	Best New Artist performance
Hebe Tien	Déjà vu
Jolin Tsai	MUSE: Queen of Stage

== Presenters ==
Presenters for the popular music categories:

Presenter(s)	Presented
Fish Leong	Best Instrumental Composition; Best Composition
Huang Yee-ling (黃乙玲)	Best Male Taiwanese Singer
Kay Huang (黃韻玲)	Producer of the Year (Instrumental); Best Instrumental Album
Luantan Ascent (亂彈阿翔)	Best Lyrics; Best Band
Lung Ying-tai	Lifetime Contribution Award
Matzka; Ara Kimbo (胡德夫)	Best Aboriginal Singer; Best Aboriginal Album
Power Station	Best Music Arrangement; Best Group
Denise Ho	Best Album Design; Best Music Video
Jody Chiang	Best Female Taiwanese Singer; Best Taiwanese Album
Hsieh Yu-Wei (謝宇威)	Best Hakka Singer; Best Hakka Album
Tanya Chua	Producer of the Year (Single); Producer of the Year (Album)
Miss Ko (葛仲珊)	Best New Artist
Jeannie Hsieh	Song of the Year
Jam Hsiao	Best Male Mandarin Singer
Sandy Lam	Best Female Mandarin Singer
Mayday; Jolin Tsai	Best Mandarin Album
