= Funky Brothers =

Taiwanese funk/pop band

- Born: Taiwan
- Years active: 2007–present
- Musical career
- Origin: Taiwan
- Genres: Funk, Pop
- Label: Independent
- Members: Airy (vocal); Andy (guitar); Evel (bass); JiaWei (keyboard); Mr. Banana (Trumpet); Damien (saxophone); Sion Hsu (drums); GuoHua (percussions)
- Past members: Threestones (vocals, keyboard); An-Chi (Trombone)

Funky Brothers is a Taiwanese Band. The band was formed by singer Threestones, bassist Evel and guitarist Andy after they felt the lack of funky music in the Taiwan indie music scene. The music of the Funky Brothers is a blend a funk, reggae, soul, R&B, jazz, folk and pop. The Funky brothers are known for their energetic live performances at main Taiwanese events such as Formoz Festival, Spring Scream, Rock in Taichung, etc...

== Biography ==
- 2007 founding of the band in Taipei
- 2009 the Funky Brothers participated in the TV program "Super Band"
- 2012 the Funky brothers were the first Taiwanese band to launch a Crowdfunding campaign to finance their first full album. The project started in summer 2012 for which 272 participants helped to raise $380,000 NTD within 2 months.
- 2013 Funky Brothers eponymous album was released in July 2013 in Taipei.
- 2014 the album "Funky Brothers" was nominated at the 25th Golden Melody Awards in two categories: Best Band and Best New Artist

== Works ==
=== Album ===
- 2013《Funky Brothers》(eponymous album)

=== EP ===
- 2011《Boogie Nights》

=== MV ===
- 2014 《The Smile》
- 2014 《Music Addiction》

== Awards and nominations ==
25th Golden Melody Awards, Taiwan - 2014
| Year | Award | Category | Nomination | Result | Ref |
|---|---|---|---|---|---|
| 2014 | 25th Golden Melody Awards | Best Band | Funky Brothers for Funky Brothers | Nominated | |
| 2014 | 25th Golden Melody Awards | Best New Artist | Funky Brothers for Funky Brothers | Nominated | |
