= Superband (band) =

Mandopop supergroup

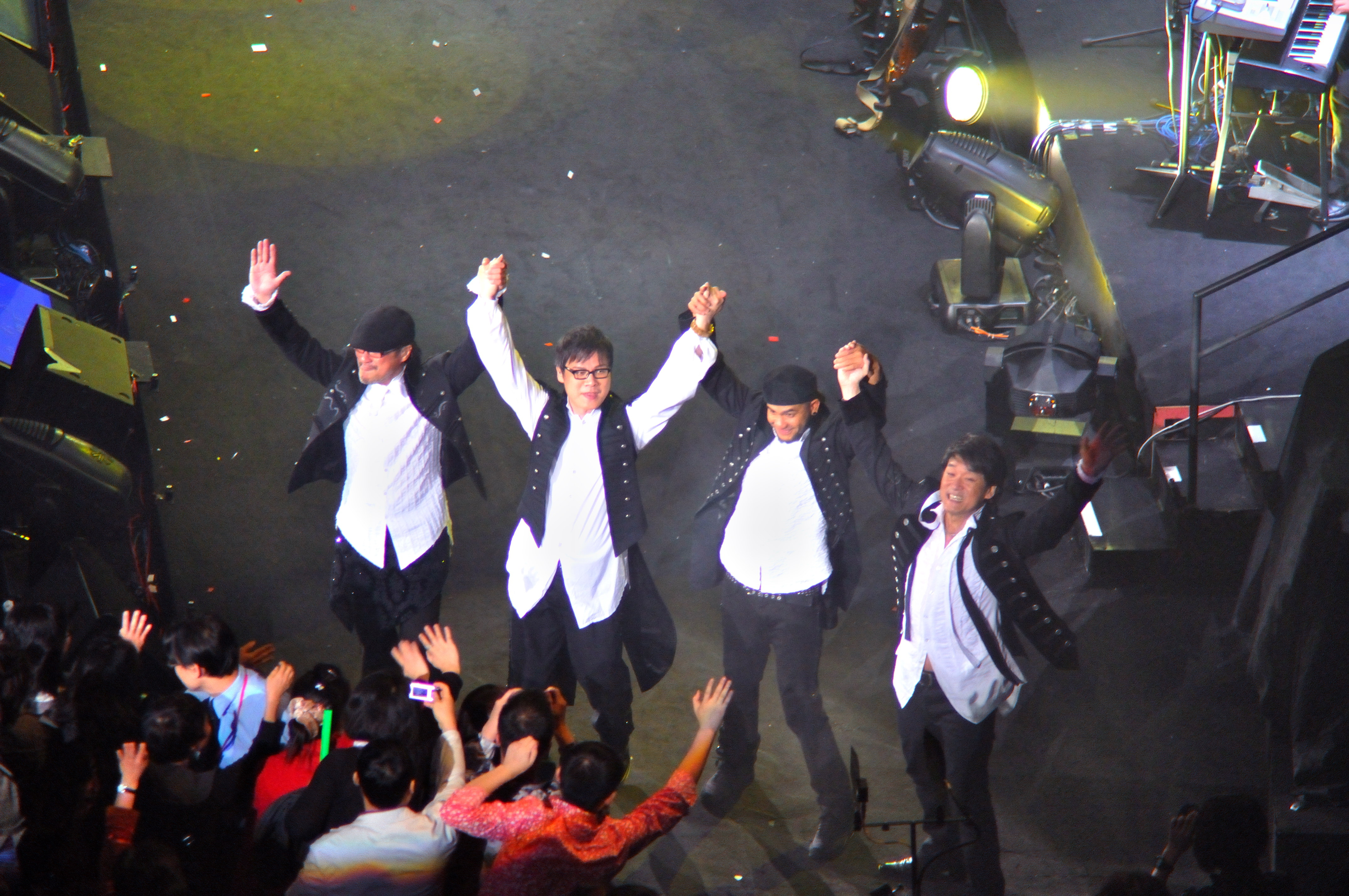

Background information
- Origin: Taiwan; Hong Kong
- Genres: Mandopop; rock
- Occupations: Singers; record producers
- Years active: 2008–2010
- Labels: Rock Records
- Past members: Lo Ta-yu; Jonathan Lee; Wakin Chau; Chang Chen-yue

Chinese name
- Traditional Chinese: 縱貫線
- Simplified Chinese: 纵贯线
Transcriptions
Standard Mandarin
- Hanyu Pinyin: zong4 guan1 xian4
Yue: Cantonese
- Jyutping: zung3 gun3 sin3

Superband was a mandopop supergroup formed by four veteran singers Lo Ta-yu, Jonathan Lee, Wakin Chau and Chang Chen-yue.

The group was formed in 2008. In total they have released over 70 albums in their individual careers, 600 main compositions and more than 350 individual concerts.

After giving twenty performances around the world, the band held their final concert in the Mohegan Sun Arena in Connecticut, USA on 22 February 2010. Afterwards they resumed their individual careers.

== Discography ==
- 2009 – North Bound (北上列車) (EP)
- 2010 – Go South (南下專線) (EP)
- 2010 - Live in Taipei/出發

== World Tour Concert ==
Year	Date	Place
2009	7 March	Taiwan (Taipei) – Taipei Arena
2009	28–29 March	Hong Kong – Hong Kong Coliseum
2009	18 April	China (Beijing) – Workers' Stadium
2009	25 April	China (Hangzhou) – Yellow Dragon Sports Center
2009	15 May	China – (Tianjin) – Tianjin Olympic Center Stadium
2009	17 May	China – (Xi'an) – Shaanxi Province Stadium
2009	30 May	China (Chengdu) – Chengdu Sports Centre
2009	13 June	China (Yunnan) – Kunming Tuodong Sports Center
2009	21 June	China (Chongqing) – Chongqing Olympic Sports Center
2009	27 June	China (Harbin) – Harbin Convention Center
2009	11 July	China (Shanghai) – Hongkou Football Stadium
2009	18 July	Singapore – Singapore Indoor Stadium
2009	1 August	Malaysia (Kuala Lumpur)
2009	24 August	China (Dalian)
2009	5 September	United States (Las Vegas)
2009	7 September	United States (San Jose) – San Jose State University
2009	19 September	China (Changsha) – Helong Stadium
2009	26 September	China (Nanjing) – Nanjing Olympic Sports Centre
2009	30 September	China (Guangzhou) – Guangzhou University Town Stadium
2010	2 January	China (Wuxi) – Wuxi Sports Center
2010	6–7 January	Hong Kong – Hong Kong Coliseum
2010	23 January	Singapore – Singapore Indoor Stadium
2010	29–30 January	Taiwan (Taipei) – Taipei Arena
2010	20–21 February	United States (Connecticut) – Mohegan Sun Arena
