= Dwagie =

Taiwanese rapper

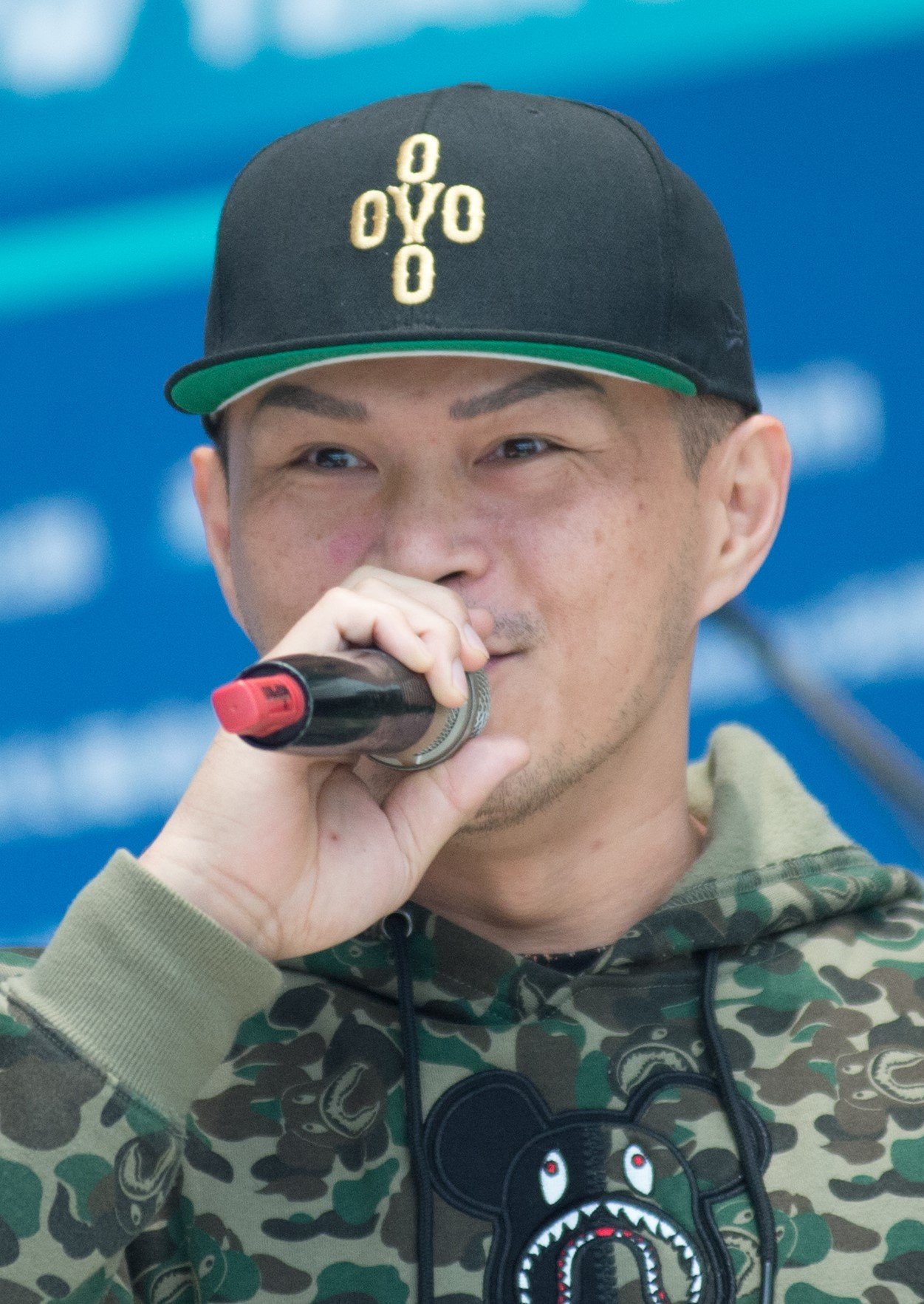
Dwagie

Tseng Kuan-jung (Chinese: 曾冠榕; pinyin: Zēng Guànróng; Pe̍h-ōe-jī: Chan Koàn-iông, c. 1979), professionally known as Dwagie (Chinese: 大支; Pe̍h-ōe-jī: Toā-ki), is a Taiwanese rapper, best known for using Taiwanese in his performances. His first solo album, Lotus from the Tongue (舌粲蓮花, 2002), was billed as the first full rap album in the Chinese-speaking world. He has also collaborated with fellow rapper MC HotDog.

Outside of the hip hop scene he is best known for his best-selling single, "Taiwan Song", which projects an unapologetic Taiwanese assertiveness. The title is a playful pun on the Mandarin word for "ode" (頌, pinyin: sòng), which also sounds like a Taiwanese word for "feeling good" (爽, POJ: sóng), as well as the English word "song".

The 8 March 2004 Asian issue of Time describes him as a writer of "pro-Taiwan rap" and the "poster boy of the DPP's southern youth vote campaign" during the 2004 presidential election. He was also featured in a segment of the 2007 Discovery Channel special The Mystical Tainan (謎樣台南). He became a proponent of humane treatment for stray animals in 2009, and has featured their point of view in his music. Dwagie supports trap, neuter, release programs in Taiwan, and has collaborated with others, such as Lotus Wang, Yang Lie, and Su Tseng-chang, to film public service announcements on stray cats, in DVD and online form.

In 2014, he collaborated with Nas on the track "Refuse to Listen". In 2016, he collaborated with Raekwon of Wu-Tang Clan on the track "Words to Trump".

== See also ==
- Taiwanese hip hop
