= Winnie Hsin =

Taiwanese singer

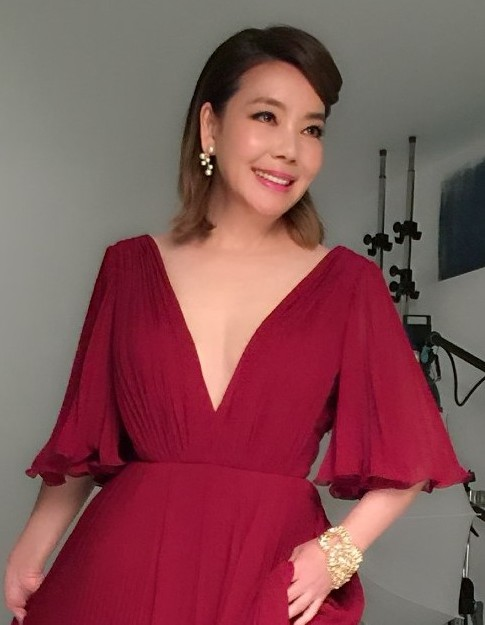
- Hsin in 2016
- Born: 8 February 1962 (age 64); Fengyuan City, Taichung County (now part of Taichung City), Taiwan
- Occupation: Singer

Chinese name
- Traditional Chinese: 辛曉琪
- Simplified Chinese: 辛晓琪
Transcriptions
Standard Mandarin
- Hanyu Pinyin: Xīn Xiǎoqí
- Musical career
- Origin: Republic of China (Taiwan)
- Genres: Mandopop
- Instruments: Piano, cello, violin
- Labels: Dream Come True; Warner Music; Decca Records; Rock Records
- Website: winniehsin.net

Winnie Hsin (Chinese: 辛曉琪; pinyin: Xīn Xiǎoqí; born 8 February 1962) is a Taiwanese singer. She is best known for her crystal clear soprano voice.

== Biography ==
In 1976, Hsin was admitted to the Taipei Hwa Kang Arts School, and in 1979 she studied music in the Chinese Culture University in Taipei. After graduating, she became a music teacher in the Yamaha Music School in Taipei. She released her first album, Lonely Winter, in 1986, and has since released a total of 16 albums, under the labels of Decca Records, Rock Records and Warner Music.

In 1995, Hsin provided the voice of the titular character in the Mandarin dubbed version of the Walt Disney animated film Pocahontas. She also performed the Mandarin version of the film's theme song, Colours of the Wind, and some other songs in the soundtrack.

In 2003, Hsin starred as Zhu Yingtai in a Taiwanese musical based on the Chinese legend of the Butterfly Lovers.

In 2006, Hsin held two solo concerts in Taiwan on 30 June and 1 July, called Winnie Hsin "The Promise" Concert.

In 2007, Hsin held another concert in Genting Highlands, Malaysia, on 26 July 2008.

In 2007, Hsin endorsed one of Avon's ANEW Alternative beauty care products.

On 7 July 2007, Hsin performed at the Live Earth concert held in Shanghai.

On 30 May 2009, Hsin performed in the Join, Love Club concert held at the Hong Kong Coliseum.

In 2009, Hsin held her first solo ticketed concert in Shanghai on 18 Dec 2009.

In 2010, Hsin held another solo ticketed concert in Chengdu on 21 Aug 2010.

In 2011, Hsin joined "Dream Come True" and planned to release an album under this label.

In 2013, Hsin took part in Hunan TV's Reality Show "I am Singer".

Also in 2013, Winnie published a book (走過) for her then 92-year-old father. This book is not for sale, instead donated to various universities and Islamic institutions as her father is a Muslim by faith.

In 2014, Hsin released her first autobiography 《時間帶不走的天真》.

In 2015, Hsin was part of panel of judges for 《橘子20華人星光大道》.

In 2016, Hsin released her album 《Flow》 in commemorative of the 30th year of her music career.

== Discography ==
Albums:

- 1986 寂寞的冬 (Lonely Winter)
- 1989 在你背影守候 (Waiting Behind Your Shadow)
- 1991 一夜之間 (Overnight)
- 1992 花時間 (Spend Time)
- 1994 領悟 (Understanding)
- 1994 味道 (Scent)
- 1995 遺忘 (Forget)
- 1995 Winter Light
- 1996 愛上他不只是我的錯 (It's Not My Fault to Love Him)
- 1997 女人何苦為難女人 (Women Shouldn't be Hard on Women)
- 1998 每個女人 (Every Women)
- 1999 怎麼 (Why?)
- 2000 談情看愛 (Talking About Love)
- 2001 永遠 (Forever)
- 2002 戀人啊 (Lovers)
- 2007 愛的回答 (Answer of Love)
- 2012 遇見快樂 (Meet Happiness)
- 2016 明白 (Flow)

Compilation albums:

- 1994 歷年精選 (Winnie Hsin Hits In Various Years)
- 1997 滾石珍藏版金碟系列：辛曉琪 (24K Golden Selection)
- 1999 守候 (Waiting for Winnie Hsin)
- 2002 失物招領 (Lost and Found)
- 2003 滾石香港黃金十年：辛曉琪精選 (Rock Hong Kong 10th Anniversary: Winnie Hsin Greatest Hits)
- 2004 我也會愛上別人的 (新歌+精選) (I Will Fall in Love with Someone Else New + Best Selection)

Singles:

- 1995 "Love Runs Deep"
- 2006 承諾 ("Commitment")
- 2012 悠遊自在 ("At Ease")
- 2018 相信愛情 ("Believe In Love")
