= Wakin Chau =

Taiwanese singer and actor

Wakin "Emil" Chau
- 周華健
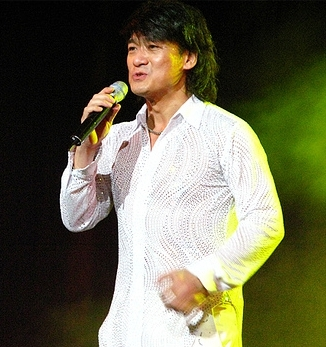
- Chau in concert 2007
- Born: 22 December 1960 (age 65); Sai Ying Pun, Hong Kong
- Education: National Taiwan University (BS)
- Occupations: Singer, actor
- Years active: 1985–present
- Spouse: Constance Woods
- Children: 2
- Awards: Golden Melody Awards – Best Male Mandarin Artist; 1992

Chinese name
- Traditional Chinese: 周華健
- Simplified Chinese: 周华健
Transcriptions
Standard Mandarin
- Hanyu Pinyin: Zhōu Huájiàn
Yue: Cantonese
- Jyutping: Zau1 Wa4 Gin6
- Musical career
- Also known as: Emil Chau, Wakin Chau, Chou Hua-Chien, Zhou Huajian, Chau Wah-Kin
- Origin: Hong Kong
- Genres: Mandopop, Cantopop
- Label: Rock Records
- Website: Wakin.com

Wakin Chau (Chinese: 周华健; pinyin: Zhōu Huájiàn; Jyutping: Zau1 Waa4 Gin6; born 22 December 1960), better known by his stage name Emil Chau during the 1980s and 1990s, is a Hong Kong-born Taiwanese singer and actor, popular throughout Taiwan, Hong Kong, Macau, Mainland China, and parts of Southeast Asia (Singapore, Malaysia, Indonesia and Vietnam). As of 2007, he has released more than 40 albums.

== Early life ==
Wakin Chau was born in Sai Ying Pun, Hong Kong, the fourth son out of seven children. His parents are owners of a rice store. He is a native Cantonese speaker of Chaoshanese descent from Chaoyang, Swatow, Guangdong, mainland China. He began learning the guitar when he was about 13 years old. In 1979, he left for Taipei to major in mathematics at National Taiwan University. While at college, he sang and played folk songs in local coffee shops, learning to sing in Mandarin.

== Music career ==
Hoping to establish a career as a recording artist, Chau sought contacts in the music industry, but after an initial lack of success, eventually signed on as an assistant producer at Rock Records, where he wrote pop songs for other artists. He was later encouraged by Chyi Yu to perform jingles for commercial advertisements. One of his jingles for a car commercial was heard by his boss at Rock, who recognised his voice and gave him a chance to record a Mandarin album, released on Rock Records in 1985.

From 1985, under the name Emil Chau, he has released more than 40 albums in Mandarin, Cantonese and English. His platinum albums, including You Make Me Happy and Sad (讓我歡喜讓我憂), The Flowery Heart (花·心), Music Brings Us Together (有弦相聚) and Emil & Friends (朋友) have won awards in Taiwan, mainland China, Hong Kong and Singapore. Chau reverted to using his given name Wakin in 1999.

In 2008, Chau formed the four-member supergroup Superband, along with Jonathan Lee, Chang Chen-yue and Lo Ta-yu, which became a highly successful touring act. They disbanded and resumed their solo careers in 2010.

== Other activities ==
Chau has also appeared in some films, and on TV and radio programs in China, Hong Kong, Taiwan, Malaysia, Singapore and Japan. Alongside his singing career, he is a restaurateur and is active in international charitable causes, such as kidney dialysis charities in Singapore, the January 2002 "Take a Deep Breath" concert in Taipei to raise money for local health-care organisations, Beijing's 4th Grand Charity Drive for Children in 2005, and Jackie Chan's all-star concerts in Las Vegas.

== Personal life ==
Chau married Constance Woods, an American woman, in 1986. They met in Taiwan because her father was a Fulbright scholar there.

== Discography ==
=== Mandarin studio albums ===
- 最後圓舞曲 The Last Waltz (Feb 1985)
- 心的方向 Direction of the Heart (Jul 1987)
- 我付出我的真愛 我實現我的夢 I Gave My Love I Realized My Dream (Aug 1988)
- 期待更多 付出更多 The More You Give the More You Expect (Jan 1989)
- 最真的夢 The Truest Dream (Nov 1989)
- 不願一個人 I Don't Want to Be Alone (Dec 1990)
- 讓我歡喜讓我憂 You Make Me Happy and Sad (Nov 1991)
- 花·心 The Flowery Heart (Apr 1993)
- 風雨無阻 Nothing Will Stop Me From Loving You (Jun 1994)
- 我願意去等 I Am Willing to Go Soon (Feb 1995)
- 愛相隨 Love Follows Us (Jul 1995)
- 愛的光 Light of Love (Feb 1996)
- 朋友 Emil & Friends (Apr 1997)
- 有故事的人 Story Teller (Aug 1998)
- 現在 Now (Nov 1999)
- 忘憂草 Day Lilies (Oct 2001)
- 一起吃苦的幸福 Love Hotel (Jul 2003)
- 雨人 Wakin in the Rain (Mar 2006)
- 花旦 Diva (May 2011)
- 江湖 Jiang Hu (Dec 2013)
- 少年 The Younger Me (Dec 2019)
- 怎麼斷句呢 Diagramming the Words (May 2026)

=== Cantonese studio albums ===
- 有弦相聚(真的周华健) Music Brings Us Together (Oct 1994)
- 弦途有你(真的周华健 II) You Stand By Me (Apr 1995)
- 弦弦全全(真的周华健·完满篇) Completely (Dec 1995)
- 生·生活 Living With Emil Chau (Dec 1996)
- 世界由你我開始 The World Begins With Us (Oct 1997)

=== English studio albums ===
- Sad Without You (Sep 1988)
- Blue Bird (Feb 1991)
- I Remember (May 1992)
- Songs of Birds (Aug 1993)
- My Oh My (Feb 2001)

=== Collaborations ===
- "Beijing Welcomes You" (2008) with various artists (only Sony Music Taiwan)
- "I Love You Suddenly" (2009) with Della Ding - Autumn's Concerto ending theme

== Filmography ==
- 1987: Osmanthus Alley (桂花巷)
- 1987: The Game They Called Sex (黃色故事) - Tung Tzu-Chi
- 1993: Once a Cop (aka. Project S) - Martin Lee
- 1994: Right Here Waiting (等愛的女人) - Alex Chow
- 1995: Rumble in the Bronx - Ice Cream Man
- 1995: Just Married (橫紋刀劈扭紋柴) - Kong Chi Wa
- 1995: I Want to Go on Living (我要活下去) - Man Chi-Yeung
- 1995: Faithfully Yours (叛逆情緣) - Pao Wing-Cheung
- 1996: Who's the Woman, Who's the Man? (金枝玉葉2)
- 1997: Mr. Nice Guy - Ice Cream Man
- 1997: All's Well, Ends Well 1997 - Long
- 1997: (知解時空)
- 1997: Walk In (奪舍)
- 1997: Spicy Love Soup (愛情麻辣燙) - Neighbor
- 1999: Gorgeous (玻璃樽) - L.W. Lo
- 1999: Purple Storm (紫雨風暴) - Ma Li
- 2001: Headlines (頭號人物) - Sorrow Chan
- 2003: Homerun - Policeman
- 2003: The Pawnshop No. 8 (第八號當鋪) (TV Series)
- 2012: The Late Night Stop (小站) (TV Series)
- 2018: Cats and Peachtopia (猫与桃花源) - The Piano Cat
