= 22nd Golden Melody Awards =

Taiwanese music awards ceremony in 2011

- Location: Taipei Arena, Taiwan
- Hosted by: Jacky Wu, Patty Hou

Television/radio coverage
- Network: TTV

The 22nd Golden Melody Awards were held in Taipei, Taiwan on 18 June 2011. The awards ceremony gave musical awards to musicians and songs in languages such as Mandarin, Taiwanese, and Hakka.

== Winners ==
Below is a list of winners in major categories

=== "Song of the Year" ===
- Jonathan Lee, “Jonathan’s Song."

=== "Best Mandarin Album" ===
- Jay Chou, “Cross-generation.”

=== "Best Mandarin male singer" ===
- Jay Chou, “Cross-generation.”

=== "Best Mandarin female singer" ===
- Karen Mok, “Precious.”

=== "Best Singing Group" ===
- Da Mouth.

=== "Best Band" ===
- Matzka.

=== "Best composer" ===
- Jonathan Lee, “Jonathan’s Song.”

=== "Best lyricist" ===
- Jonathan Lee, “Jonathan’s Song.”

=== "Best album producer" ===
- Eric Hung, “Flower of Love.”

=== "Best single producer" ===
- Wang Ji-ping, “Love!”

=== "Best arranger" ===
- Tsai Ke-jun, “Free Instructional Video.”

=== "Lifetime achievement award" ===
- Huang Min.

=== "Best music video" ===
- Hebe Tien, “Leave Me Alone.” (Director: Hsu Yun-Hsuan)

=== "Best New Artist" ===
- William Wei.
