= MC HotDog =

Taiwanese rap artist (born 1978)

MCHotDog
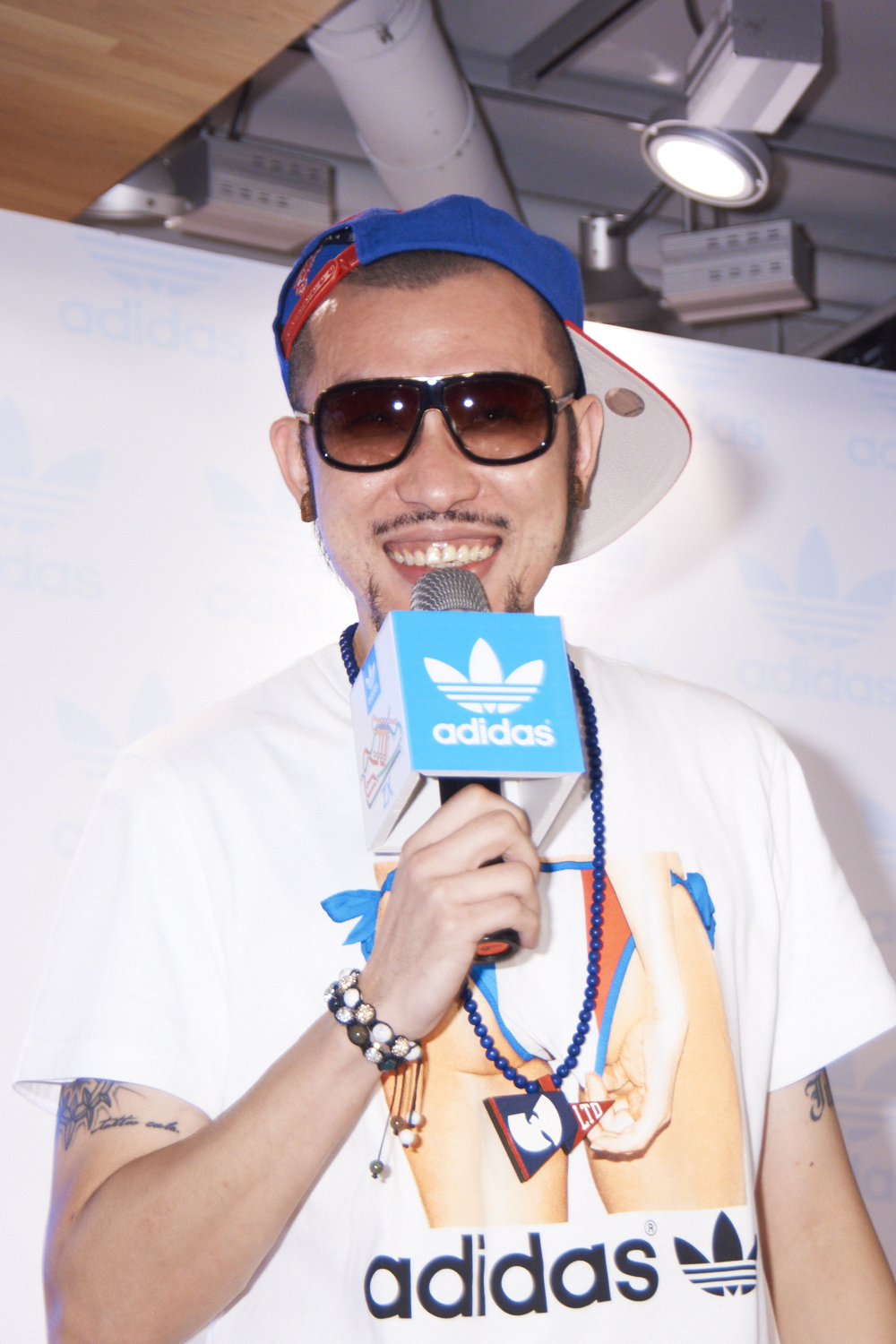
- MCHotDog in 2012

Background information
- Born: 姚中仁 (Yao Zhongren); April 10, 1978 (age 48)
- Origin: Taipei, Taiwan
- Genre: Hip hop
- Occupations: Hip hop artist; Talent show judge

Yao Zhong Ren (Chinese: 姚中仁; pinyin: Yáo Zhōngrén; Wade–Giles: Yao Chung-jen; Pe̍h-ōe-jī: Iâu Tiong-jîn; born April 10, 1978), professionally known as MCHotDog, is a Taiwanese rap artist and best known as “The Father of Taiwanese Hip Hop Music”. He is also known for his use of explicit lyrics in his songs.

In 2001, his four mini-CDs sold over 220,000 copies. In 2004, he toured with Chang Chen-yue in the North American Kill Kitty tour. In 2006, MCHotDog released an album Wake Up, which contains hit song 「我愛臺妹」 (I Love Taiwanese Girls). 「我愛臺妹」 is currently featured in a commercial for Kuang Chuan Tea Time. It sampled Glenn Frey's "The One You Love" and The Spinners (American group)'s "I'll Be Around". The track won "Best Karaoke Song" at the 2007 HITO Radio Music Awards, presented by Taiwanese radio station Hit FM. Wake Up was both a critically acclaimed album as well as a commercial success, as it provided MCHotDog with crossover appeal. In 2008, MCHotDog released a new album called Mr. Almost.

He has been a judge on The Rap of China television show.

== Career ==
MC HotDog's career began when he was a student at Fu Jen Catholic University, which he attended from 1996 to 2001. During this period, he self-published his music through the website "Master U". These songs attracted significant attention from the Mandarin-speaking hip hop community, leading HotDog to be regarded as Taiwan's first underground rap artist. After performing at a 1999 concert, HotDog was introduced by the venue owner to figures from the Magic Stone Music label. He subsequently signed with Big Circus Music Studio, a subsidiary of Magic Stone that also represented artists like Dwagie, in 2000. Through Big Circus, HotDog released a sequence of four EPs throughout 2001, which collectively sold over 300,000 copies.

In 2002 and 2003, MC HotDog was unable to release any music, as he was performing his mandatory military service. However, after his discharge from the military, he rapidly began touring. In 2004 and 2005, HotDog supported Chang Chen-yue in tours throughout Taiwan, the United States and Hong Kong. He also performed at the 17th Golden Melody Awards in 2006.

MC HotDog released his first studio album, Wake Up, in January 2006. This album proved to be a critical success, winning Best Mandarin Album at the 18th Golden Melody Awards. HotDog also followed the album's release with an April 2006 solo concert at Taipei World Trade Center II. MC HotDog followed Wake Up with the 2008 album Mr. Almost and the 2012 album Poverty Million Star.

In 2017, MC HotDog joined the cast of reality competition show The Rap of China as a judge. He continued to serve in this role for the show's second and third seasons. HotDog also appeared as a contestant on the reality show Call Me by Fire in 2021.

MC HotDog served as an instructor for "Rap for Youth" in 2020.

MC HotDog won the Golden Melody Award for Best Male Mandarin Singer in 2024, for his album Disgusted Artist, as well as the Golden Melody Award for Best Lyricist for the song "The Landlord Upstairs".

== Personal life ==
In a 2014 interview, MC HotDog stated that during his youth he had taken drugs such as MDMA, marijuana and ketamine, but that he had since quit for the sake of his health.

== Musical work ==
=== Extended play ===
The album name	Repertoire	Album information
MC HotDog	1. Intro; 2. Let me rap (讓我RAP); 3. where are you going (你要去那裡)	Magic stone January 2001 Extended play
dog (犬)	1. Intro; 2. my life (我的生活); 3. Angel thirteen (十三號天使); 4. Korean Wave is coming (韓流來襲); 5. Ximending Old Man (西門町老人); 6. Skit; 7. graduation (畢業); 8. Korean Wave is coming─Live version (韓流來襲─現場演唱版)	Magic stone April 2001 Extended play
Gangs who are passionately pursuing MCdog (哈狗幫)	1. belief (信仰); 2. Gangs who are passionately pursuing MCdog (哈狗幫); 3. Happy (快樂); 4. BuBuBu (補補補); 5. Skit; 6. 1030; 7. 18 years old (18岁)	Magic stone June 2001 Extended play
bottom Inning (九局下半)	1. bottom Inning (九局下半); 2. Boys and girls Pooh (男生女生呸); 3. Happy (快樂)/18 years old (18歲)/Let me rap-VCD(讓我RAP-VCD); 4. Haven't had enough-documentary+MVFull record (還沒玩完─記錄片+MV全紀錄)	Magic stone October 2001 Extended play+VCD

=== Regular album ===
The album name	Repertoire	Album information	Remarks
"Wake Up"	1. Intro; 2. persist in one's old ways (我行我素); 3. rookie king (新人王); 4. Lin Chi-Ling sister come to me (志玲姊姊來找我); 5. I Love Taiwanese Girls -feat. Chang Chen-yue (我愛台妹-feat.張震嶽); 6. Don't forget the sufferings of the past (毋忘在莒); 7. Matsu serenade (馬祖小夜曲); 8. Introducing Arthur boy (Introducing啞色小狗); 9. 2006 Champion Love Song (2006冠軍情歌); 10. Tiger Style; 11. tigress (母老虎); 12. Our party is the most talkative (我們的Party最扯); 13. I went to TU when I was young (我小時候都去TU); 14. Annoying (煩死人); 15. My life II (我的生活II); 16. Outro; 17. Encore (安可)	Rock Records January 2006 Album	18th Golden Melody Awards Best Mandarin Album Award
"Mr. Almost" (差不多先生)	1. I'm mad (我瘋了); 2. Mr. Almost (差不多先生); 3. I like you (我哈你); 4. ocean (海洋); 5. Thanks yahoo (謝謝啞唬); 6. King of the Blind King (瞎王之王); 7. poison (毒); 8. Please clap your hands (請拍手); 9. How can feat. Nien-Hsien (怎麼能夠 feat.馬念先); 10. They feel (他們覺得)	Rock Records October 2008 Album	
"Poverty Million Star" (貧民百萬歌星)	1. Poverty Million Star (INTRO) (貧民百萬歌星 INTRO); 2. Poverty Million Star (貧民百萬歌星); 3. Skipping breakfast is a funny thing feat. Du zhenxi (不吃早餐才是一件很嘻哈的事feat. Du zhenxi); 4. I met you here by chanceSKIT (和你巧遇在這裡SKIT); 5. Light mature 27 feat. MiacaKuan (輕熟女 27 feat.關彥淳); 6. MC is here (MC來了); 7. so boring feat. A-Yue (好無聊 feat. A-Yue); 8. go away feat. Chang Chen-yue (離開 feat.張震嶽); 9. Hi hi life feat. Chang Chen-yue, Guan ying (嗨嗨人生 feat.張震嶽、關穎); 10. After the break SKIT (散場之後SKIT); 11. After Party (feat. Scottie); 12. HeiHei Taxi (嘿嘿Taxi); 13. News bulletin SKIT (新聞快報SKIT ) 14. Live @ Legacy SKIT; 15. Party Like HotDog; 16. I have money (老子有錢); 17. Woman 27 (Acoustic Version) (feat. Guan ying)	Rock Records July 13, 2012 Album	
"waste" (廢物)	1. Hip hop no party (嘻哈沒有派對); 2. change feat. Chang Chen-yue (改變 Feat.張震嶽); 3. Just let the bullet fly Feat. E-So (就讓子彈飛 Feat. E-So瘦子); 4. Meteor Serenade Feat. Yoyo Sham (流星小夜曲 Feat.岑寧兒); 5. Insomnia is a disease Feat. J.Sheon (失眠是一種病 Feat. J.Sheon); 6. World-weary Chihuahua (厭世吉娃娃); 7. Dream camera (夢幻照相機); 8. Lonely monster (寂寞の水怪); 9. Grudge Feat. Eve Ai (怨偶 Feat. 艾怡良); 10. Goodbye Hip-Hop (再見Hip-Hop); 11. I'm Loser (我是魯蛇); 12. Do You Remember; 13. Hip hop no party—Trap Metal Version (嘻哈沒有派對Trap Metal Version)	Rock Records June 5, 2019 Album	

=== "Brothers True Colors Sunset" (G.U.T.S.) ===
==== Extended play ====
The album name	Issue date	Record company	
FLY OUT	January 20, 2016	Rock Records	1. Oversized luggage-Chang Chen-yue&E-So (超大行李-張震嶽 & 瘦子); 2. Lost Lamb-Chang Chen-yue&E-So&Da yuan (迷途羔羊-張震嶽 & 瘦子 & 大淵); 3. FLY OUT; 4. mortal-MC HotDog&Da yuan&Xiao chun&Double.J 凡人 (姚中仁 & 大淵 & 小春 & 呆寶靜); 5. COMING HOME-MC HotDog&MJ116 (姚中仁 & 頑童MJ116); 6. When we mix together (當我們混在一起)
SKRU UP	April 21, 2017	Rock Records	1. Shake off (搖落); 2. Tin House (鐵皮屋); 3. motorcycle (摩托車); 4. Give you the sweetest (把最甜的都給你); 5. Another day (又過一天); 6. Messed up (搞砸)

=== Single ===
Single name	Issue date	Record company	Repertoire
Secret base (秘密基地)	March 20, 2016	Rock Records	1. Secret base (秘密基地)-Wu Nien-jen&G.U.T.S.
We Will Rule (背水一战)	May 25, 2016	Rock Records	1. We Will Rule背水一战
Got Your back	July 27, 2017	Rock Records	1. Got Your back

== Host works ==
Music Television Taiwan Channel (MTV.tw) 'What can you expect from a dog but a bark' (狗嘴不吐象牙) Hot Dog Show, Cooperate with Dwagie. -During the show: September 11, 2007

IQIYI 'The Rap of China' One of the instructors, commented with Chang Chen-yue.

IQIYI 'The Rap of China 2' One of the instructors, Partner with Z Chang Chen-yue again.

YouTube, ETtoday News Cloud, Chung T'ien Television (CTi TV), Taiwan Television Enterprise (TTV), IQIYI 'Dancing Diamond 52' Special tutor

bilibili 'Rap for Youth' one of the mentors.

== Other work ==
Individual single
Date	Author	Source	Works
Year 1999	MC HotDog	Network upload	'钓虾场'
September 2010	MC HotDog	The theme song of the movie "Cool Horse" (酷马)	"Cool Horse" (酷马)

Co-op single
Date	Cooperation	Album	Works
April 2002	Dwagie	The theme song of the movie "Better Than Sex"	'命运青红灯'
2007	Nien-Hsien Ma	Impossible Mix (2) (不可能的Mix2)	'断背山'
July 2007	Chang Chen-yue, Patty Hou	OK	Just let this song (就让这首歌)
July 2007	Nan Quan Mama	Treasure Map (藏宝图)	Here we go
April 2008	Jeff Chang	Escape (逃生)	Bicycles and sport cars (单车与跑车)
July 2008	Shen Pi (参劈)	The beginning of the rhyme (押韵的开始)	Python (巨蟒)
July 2008	Ding Dang	Decisively Loved (我爱上的)	I'm not afraid (我不怕)
May 2009	Nien-Hsien Ma	Women's health cooperation (女性保健合作)	I love Yes Girl (我爱 Yes Girl)
June 2009	Gary Chaw	Super 4th field (超级4th场)	Curry hot dog (咖喱热狗)
July 2009	FanFan	F ONE	1 to 10 = me and you (1到10=我和你)
December 2009	JJ Lin	Hundred Days (100天)	Go! (加油！)
June 2010	Sammi Cheng	Believers get love (信者得爱)	Believers get love-Mandarin (信者得爱)
August 2011	Amber An	Evil Girl (恶女)	Love Soon (快快爱)
December 2011	Dwagie	people (人)	Ba La (芭乐)
December 2011	Edison Chen, Sam Lee, MC仁, Chef	What time? (几点？)	What time? (几点？)
June 2013	Xiao Ren, Dwagie	Lilliputian (小人国)	Changed a lot (变了好多)
August 2013	Du zhenxi, Miss Ko	Co-op single	walk this way
September 2013	Tanya Chua	Angel & Devil (天使与魔鬼)	Easy Come Easy GO
February 2014	Witness, J Wu	Co-op single	Welcome back
April 2014	Urchin MJ116 (顽童 MJ116)	Fresh Game	MJ FRESH GANG
July 2015	Yue Yunpeng	Interlude from the movie "Jian Bing Man"	Song of the Fifth Ring Road (五环之歌)
July 2016	Edison Chen, Sammi Cheng	Co-op single	MR SANDMAN
June 2018	Xiongzai (熊仔), BR, Hansen (韩森), Xiao Ren, Dwagie	Peace?Zero Fur Concert (Peace?零皮草演唱会)	Peace?
July 2018	ILL MO	Co-op single	Nightclub love
September 2018	Chang Chen-yue, Paikete (派克特), Gongfupang (功夫胖)	Co-op single	Goodbye hip hop (再见 hip hop)
September 2018	Tizzy T, Vava, Young Jack	Co-op single	Poverty Million boy (贫民百万男孩)

Limited combination
date	Cooperation	Combination name	Album/EP
September 2013	Edison Chen	Super brothers	Super brothers
January 2016	Chang Chen-yue, Urchin MJ116 (顽童 MJ116)	G.U.T.S.	FLY OUT
April 2017	Chang Chen-yue, Urchin MJ116(顽童 MJ116)	G.U.T.S.	SKRU UP

'me as a singer-songwriter' (我是唱作人) Create a single
years	Songwriting	works
2019 year	MC HotDog	Hip-hop no party (Hip-hop没有派对)
2019 year	MC HotDog	Insomnia is a disease (失眠是一种病)
2019 year	MC HotDog	change (改变)
2019 year	MC HotDog	Do You Remember
2019 year	MC HotDog	Must win? (非赢不可？)

== Film and television works ==
Movie: A Strong Insect Crossing The River (猛虫过江) as Zaihu (在虎)

Web drama: SOHU 'Need for Lady 4' (极品女士4)

Ad: Galactic online (银河线上) 'I have money Online', Xiaoyaohuyu (逍遥互娱) 'Inuyasha Jade Hunting Journey' (犬夜叉 寻玉之旅)

== Concert ==
"废欲清" Concert tour
date	country / region	city	Venue
June 23, 2019	Republic of China	Taipei	Legacy Taipei
June 29, 2019	Republic of China	Taichung	Legacy Taichung
July 6, 2019	Republic of China	Kaohsiung	LIVE WAREHOUSE
August 23, 2019	China	Xian	Mao Livehouse
August 24, 2019	China	Tianjin	66Livehouse
August 29, 2019	China	Hangzhou	Mao Livehouse
August 31, 2019	China	Wuhan	Chinese cultural expo center (Wuhan)
September 4, 2019	China	Changsha	Mao Livehouse
September 6, 2019	China	Chengdu	Bloomage LIVE·528Mspace
September 7, 2019	China	Kunming	Mao Livehouse
September 8, 2019	China	Shenzhen	Hey Town (嘿吼小镇)
December 14, 2019	China	Changchun	Y-LIVE Eagle Entertainment Music Scene (Y-LIVE鹰之娱乐现场)
December 15, 2019	China	Qingdao	Downtown Bar
December 18, 2019	China	Zhengzhou	7LIVEHOUSE
December 19, 2019	China	Chongqing	Yinpai Power Space Live House (寅派动力空间)
December 21, 2019	China	Ningbo	Ningbo Star Nest Theater (宁波星巢剧场)
March 11, 2020	France	Paris	Le Trabendo
March 14, 2020	United Kingdom	London	The Lighthouse Theatre
March 20, 2020	United States	Los Angeles	The Fonda Theatre
March 21, 2020	United States	San Francisco	August Hall
March 24, 2020	United States	Portland	Hawthorne Theater
March 25, 2020	United States	Seattle	Neptune
March 27, 2020	Canada	Vancouver	Vogue Theatre
March 27, 2020	Canada	Toronto	Phoenix Concert Theatre
March 31, 2020	United States	Boston	Paradise Rock Club
April 2, 2020	United States	Philadelphia	Underground Arts
April 3, 2020	United States	new York	Webster Hall
April 6, 2020	United States	Chicago	Lincoln Hall
April 8, 2020	United States	Dallas	Trees
April 9, 2020	United States	Houston	White Oak Music Hall

== Award record ==
years	Session	Album	Awards	Shortlisted	result
2007	The 10th Chinese musicians exchange association	'Wake Up'	Top Ten Albums of the Year	Wake Up	Won
2007	18th Golden Melody Awards	'Wake Up'	Best Mandarin Album	Wake Up	Won
2009	The 12th Chinese musicians exchange association	'Mr. Almost' (差不多先生)	Top Ten Albums of the Year	'Mr. Almost' (差不多先生)	Won
2009	The 12th Chinese musicians exchange association	'Mr. Almost' (差不多先生)	Top Ten Singles of the Year	'Mr. Almost' (差不多先生)	Won
2009	The 12th Chinese musicians exchange association	'Mr. Almost' (差不多先生)	Top Ten Singles of the Year	ocean (海洋)	Won
2013	24th Golden Melody Awards	'Poverty Million Star' (贫民百万歌星)	Best Mandarin Album	'Poverty Million Star' (贫民百万歌星)	Nominated
2013	24th Golden Melody Awards	'Poverty Million Star' (贫民百万歌星)	Best Lyricist Award	'Poverty Million Star' (贫民百万歌星)	Nominated
2013	The 4th Golden Indie Music Awards	'Poverty Million Star' (贫民百万歌星)	Best Hip Hop Album Award	'Poverty Million Star' (贫民百万歌星)	Won
2013	The 4th Golden Indie Music Awards	'Poverty Million Star' (贫民百万歌星)	Best Hip Hop Single Award	'Poverty Million Star' (贫民百万歌星)	Nominated
2019	The 10th Golden Indie Music Awards	'waste' (废物)	Best Hip Hop Album Award	'waste' (废物)	Nominated
2019	The 10th Golden Indie Music Awards	'waste' (废物)	Best Hip Hop Single Award	'Hip hop no party' (嘻哈没有派对)	Nominated
