= Rock Records =

Taiwanese record label

Rock Records Co., Ltd.
- Trade name: Rock Records (滾石唱片)
- Native name: 滾石國際音樂股份有限公司
- Industry: Music, Entertainment
- Founded: January 28, 1986; 40 years ago
- Founder: Tuan Chung-tan, Tuan Chung-i
- Headquarters: Neihu, Taipei, Taiwan
- Number of locations: 5
- Area served: Worldwide, mainly East Asia and Southeast Asia
- Key people: Tuan Chung-i (Chairman)
- Net income: NT$186,400,000 (2019)
- Number of employees: 70 (2019)
- Subsidiaries: Rock Music Publishing
- Website: www.rock.com.tw

The Rock Records Co., Ltd. (Chinese: 滾石國際音樂股份有限公司; Pe̍h-ōe-jī: Kún-se̍k Kok-chè Im-ga̍k Kó͘-hūn Iú-hān Kong-si) commonly known as Rock Records (Chinese: 滾石唱片; Pe̍h-ōe-jī: Kún-se̍k Chhiùⁿ-phìⁿ), is a record label based in Taipei, Taiwan. Founded in the 1980s as the Rock Music Publishing (滾石有聲出版社; Pe̍h-ōe-jī: Kún-se̍k Ū-siaⁿ Chhut-pán-siā) by Tuan Chung-tan and Tuan Chung-i, It is the largest record label in Chinese-speaking world and the second largest independent record label in Asia.

Beside its headquarters in Taiwan, it also has locations in Hong Kong, mainland China, Japan, Singapore, Malaysia (acquired SCS in 1995 (Suara Cipta Sempurna), founded in the 1980s), South Korea, the Philippines and the United States.

== Distributors ==
- Avex Group (Japan, former)
- Nippon Crown (Japan, former) (until 1997)
- Pony Canyon (Japan and South Korea)
- Synergy Music / Ivory Music (Philippines)
- Star Records (Philippines, former) (1997-????)
- Aquarius Musikindo (Indonesia, former)
- Musica Studios (Indonesia)

== Artists ==
=== Singers ===
- Wakin Chau (周華健)
- Gary Chaw (曹格)
- Ambrose Hui (許紹洋)
- MC HotDog
- Chang Chen-yue (張震嶽)
- Nine Chen (陳零九)
- Sun Sheng Xi (孫盛希)
- MJ116

=== Groups ===
- Astro Bunny (原子邦妮)
- New Formosa Band (新寶島康樂隊)
- Nine One One (玖壹壹)
- Tomahawk (戰斧樂隊)
- Tuesdays (星期二樂隊)

=== Pianist ===
- Sandra Wright Shen (仙杜拉)

== Former artists ==
- Ah Niu (陳慶祥/阿牛)
- Alex To (杜德偉)
- Angelica Lee (李心潔)
- Anita Mui (梅艷芳)
- As One (에즈원)
- Beyond
- Black Panther (黑豹樂隊)
- Cheer Chen (陳綺貞)
- Chyi Yu (齊豫)
- Crash (크래쉬)
- Fish Leong (梁静茹)
- Grasshopper (草蜢)
- Guang Liang (王光良)
- Jackie Chan (成龍)
- Jeff Chang (張信哲)
- Karen Mok (莫文蔚)
- Kelly Poon (潘嘉麗)
- Leslie Cheung (張國榮)
- Lee Mao-shan (李茂山）
- Lo Ta-yu (羅大佑)
- Mayday
- One-Fang (萬芳)
- PIG
- Prudence Liew (劉美君)
- Rene Liu (劉若英)
- Richie Ren (任賢齊)
- Sandy Lam (林憶蓮)
- Sarah Chen (陳淑樺)
- Shunza (順子)
- Tang Dynasty (唐朝樂隊)
- Tarcy Su (蘇慧倫)
- Tracy Huang (黃鶯鶯)
- Victor Huang (黃品冠)
- Winnie Hsin (辛曉琪)
- Wu Bai & China Blue
- Yisa Yu (郁可唯)
- Yu Heng (宇恆)
- Yuki Hsu (徐懷鈺)
- Della Ding (丁噹)
- Sasha Alexeev (薩沙 阿列克謝耶夫)
- Shorty Yuen (元若藍)
- 831 (八三夭)

== See also ==
- List of record labels
- List of companies of Taiwan
