= 5525 Back to That Day Tour =

2023–2026 concert tour by Mayday

#5525 Back To That Day Tour
- Tour by Mayday
- Promotional poster
- Location: Asia; Australia; North America
- Associated album: All of Mayday's past albums
- Start date: December 31, 2023
- End date: July 13, 2026 (Note: This concert tour was scheduled to end on July 12, 2026. Due to Typhoon Bavi, the final concert for this took place on July 13, 2026.)
- No. of shows: 162
- Attendance: 4.865 million

Mayday concert chronology
- Life Tour (2017–2019); #5525 Back to That Day Tour (2023–2026)

The #5525 Back To That Day Tour (Chinese: 回到那一天巡迴演唱會) was the twelfth concert tour by Taiwanese rock band Mayday, launched to commemorate the 25th anniversary of the band's debut. The all-stadium tour began at Taichung Intercontinental Baseball Stadium on December 31, 2023, and concluded at Taipei Dome on July 13, 2026. It spans 162 dates in Asia, Australia and North America.

== Background ==
On November 8, 2023, B'in Music announced the first six shows of their brand new tour, to be held from December 31, 2023, to January 7, 2024, at Taichung Intercontinental Baseball Stadium. Upon the conclusion of their Taichung show, Mayday unveiled five dates in Kaohsiung.

On March 17, 2024, Mayday announced seven shows in Hong Kong. On April 24, the band announced ten shows at Beijing National Stadium. In June, they announced dates in Singapore and China. From August to October, Mayday continued to add dates to their tour.

On January 22, 2025, Mayday announced their Las Vegas show. On March 30, Mayday announced eight shows at Taipei Dome, including four incorporating the new #5525+1 theme, which alternated with the standard #5525 shows throughout the schedule. For subsequent legs of their tour, Mayday continued their dual-themed concert series, alternating between #5525 and #5525+1 shows. Each theme featured distinct setlists, visuals, and narrative elements, presenting audiences with contrasting time-travel concepts that guided them through the band's past and imagined future.

On May 13, they announced twelve shows at Beijing National Stadium to be held from July 25 to August 17. A thirteenth show in Beijing was announced on July 24.

== Production ==
5525 Back To That Day Tour was produced by B'in Live.

Mayday's #5525 tour marks their 2½-decade-long history since forming in the late 1990s. The numeral "5" stands for the character "wu" (meaning "five") in the band's Chinese name. The "525" refers to the more than 525 large-scale concerts the band have performed. "25" also refers to the group's 25th anniversary.

The stage design for the concert used the concept of a time machine to address various themes across the band's nine studio albums. In the coda, Mayday expressed heartfelt gratitude to their families, friends, and fans, reflecting on the past while celebrating the present and looking forward to the future.

Technically, the production departs from traditional 2D concert displays. The main stage features a 12-metre giant LED sphere called a "heavenly time machine" and five 5-metre 3D LED spheres. These spheres are constructed with seamless splicing to create immersive, three-dimensional visuals. The show will also have 13,000 custom-made LED display panels. In selected cities, the band travels around the stadium atop a "Mayday express bus", which will allow fans to see the members up close. Audience members are equipped with reusable interactive light sticks, which are linked to their seats via a mobile application or NFC, and synchronized with the main control system via 2.5G wireless communication. This system allows for dynamic, coordinated light displays that extend the visual experience throughout the venue.

The tour's innovative stage design has captured international recognition, winning prestigious awards including the Red Dot Design Award, iF Design Award, TITAN Innovation Award, and A' Design Award. Mark Kneebone, managing director for New Zealand at Live Nation APAC, described it as “a truly spectacular event,” adding that “the lighting, production, audience, and songs made it one of the best nights I’ve experienced in years.”

== Set list ==
=== #5525 (Dec 2023 – Jan 2026) ===
This set list was taken from the December 31, 2023, concert in Taichung, Taiwan. It does not represent all shows throughout the tour.

Act I

1. "OAOA"
2. "Sun Wu Kong (Monkey King)"
3. "Enter Battle"
4. "Don'ts Don'ts"
5. "Cheers"

Act II

6. "Reveal"
7. "World Crazy"
8. "Do What You Want To Do Now" + "John Lennon"
9. "Love-ing"

Act III – Recap of 9 studio albums

10. "Peter and Mary"
11. "Loneliness Terminator" + "Fool"
12. "People Life, Ocean Wild" + "Faith"
13. "9-Ball" + "Star of Perseverance" + "Time Machine"
14. "Enrich Your Life"
15. "Angel" + "A Thousand Centuries"
16. "The Yet Unbroken Part of My Heart"
17. "I Won't Let You Be Lonely" + "Noah's Ark"
18. "Almost Famous"

Act IV

19. "DNA"
20. "Party Animal"
21. "Jump! The World"

Act V – Surprise songs

22. "With Love To The End"
23. "Hey! I'm Leaving"
24. "Superman"
25. "Innocence"
26. "Beginning of the End"

Act VI

27. "Cang Jie"
28. "Suddenly Missing You So Bad"
29. "Song For You"
30. "Final Chapter"
31. "Dokodemo Door"

Encore I

31. "Here, After Us"
32. "Contentment"

Encore II

33. "Persistence"
34. "Tough"
35. "The Song of Laughter and Forgetting"

=== #5525+1 (Jul 2025 – present) ===
This set list was taken from the June 28, 2025, concert in Taipei, Taiwan. It does not represent all shows throughout the tour.

Act I

1. "OAOA"
2. "Sun Wu Kong (Monkey King)"
3. "Eternal Summer"
4. "Cheers"
5. "Loneliness Terminator"
6. "Do What You Want To Do Now" + "John Lennon"

Act II – Recap of 9 studio albums

7. "Almost Famous" + "What If We Had Never Met"
8. "Second Round" + "Starry Sky"
9. "The Yet Unbroken Part of My Heart"
10. "The Most Important Trifles"
11. "Superman"
12. "9-Ball" + "Star of Perseverance" + "Time Machine"
13. "Faith" + "People Life, Ocean Wild"
14. "Viva Love"
15. "World Crazy"

Act III

16. "Motor Rock"
17. "Party Animal"
18. "Jump! The World"
19. "Love-ing"

Act IV – Surprise songs

20. "A Song With You"
21. "Because of You"
22. "Half a Life"
23. "Beginning of the End"
24. "Garbage Truck"
25. "Tough"

Act VI

25. "Willful"
26. "Suddenly Missing You So Bad"
27. "Final Chapter"
28. "Dokodemo Door"

Encore I

29. "You Are Not Truly Happy"
30. "I Won't Let You Be Lonely"
31. "The Song of Laughter and Forgetting"
32. "Persistence"

Encore II

33. "Don'ts Don'ts"
34. "First Day"

Encore III

35. "Romeo & Juliet"
36. "Enrich Your Life"
37. "Cang Jie"

Encore IV

38. "I Love You Hopeless"
39. "Song For You" + "Clenched Teeth"

Special guests

On several dates, Mayday invited guests to perform a number of songs together.

- May 3, 2024 — Hong Kong: "Let Go" and "Friday Night" with Energy
- May 18, 2024 — Beijing: "Travel is Meaningful" and "Eloping to the Moon" with Cheer Chen
- May 31, 2024 — Beijing: "Let Go" and "Friday Night" with Energy
- July 1, 2024 — Shenzhen: "Let Go" and "Friday Night" with Energy
- July 31, 2024 — Taiyuan: "Suddenly Missing You" and "The Sad Pacific" with Richie Jen
- August 2, 2024 — Taiyuan: "Suddenly Missing You" and "Fairy Tale" with Michael Wong
- August 3, 2024 — Taiyuan: "Suddenly Missing You" and "Hard to Guess" with Della (Ding Dang)
- August 4, 2024 — Taiyuan: "Suddenly Missing You" and "Somewhere in time" with Accusefive
- September 6, 2024 — Wuhan: "Beginning of the End" and "Mayday" with Ella Chen
- September 8, 2024 — Wuhan: "Embrace", "Motor Rock", "Teng Ai" and "Peter and Mary" with Jam Hsiao
- September 10, 2024 — Wuhan: "Fulfill" and "Tough" with Rene Liu
- September 11, 2024 — Wuhan: "Here, After, Us" and "Perfume" with Xin Liu
- November 12, 2024 — Shanghai: "Contentment" and "Twilight" with JJ Lin
- November 15, 2024 — Shanghai: "Return to the World" and "Friday Night" with Energy
- January 11, 2025 — Singapore: "Return to the World" and "Friday Night" with Energy
- January 12, 2025 — Singapore: "Tenderness" and "Against the Light" with Stefanie Sun, as well as "Cloudy Day" with Roselyn Liu
- February 22, 2025 — Sydney: "Silence", "Rice Field", Won't Cry", "I Find It Hard To Say", "Willful" and "Nunchucks" with Jay Chou
- April 20, 2025 — Tianjin: "Willful" and "Step by Step" with Bai Jingting
- May 9, 2025 — Hong Kong: "Look over here, girl" with Richie Jen
- May 23, 2025 — Hangzhou: "Onion", "How Could I Tell You That I Love You", "At Last I Have Lost You", "I'm Not Good Looking But I'm Very Gentle" and "I Were a Little Bird" with Chao Chuan
- June 29, 2025 — Taipei: "Friday Night", "Do It! Now" and "Willful" with Energy
- July 4, 2025 — Taipei: "You Are My Magic" and "Tenderness" with Accusefive, as well as "You Are My Eyes" with Ricky Hsiao
- July 6, 2025 — Taipei: "Peter and Mary" and "Red Scarf" with WeiBird
- July 11, 2025 — Taipei: "Persistence" and "Nobody else in my heart" with Chou Szu-chi
- July 12, 2025 — Taipei: "Meteor Rain" and "The Song of Laughter and Forgetting" with F4
- July 27, 2025 — Beijing: "Meteor Rain" and "The Song of Laughter and Forgetting" with F4
- August 2, 2025 — Beijing: "Willful", "Like Sunny Days, Like Rainy Days", "Cheers", "Superman", "What If We Had Never Met", "Angel" and "A Thousand Centuries" with Silence Wang
- September 2, 2025 — Shanghai: "I Love Summer", "Spring's Scream" and "Love-ing" with Chang Kuo-hsi
- September 3, 2025 — Shanghai: "Perfume" and "Girl" with WeiBird
- September 4, 2025 — Shanghai: "Eloping to the Moon" and "Xiao Ban" with Chen Li
- November 14, 2025 — Shanghai: "Just Friends" and "Womxnly" with Roselyn Liu
- November 16, 2025 — Shanghai: "Here, After, Us" and "Radio" with Yuqi
- December 28, 2025 - Taichung: "Green Apple Paradise", "I Love You Forever", "Marksman", "Friday Night", "Party Animal", "Leaving the Surface of the Earth" and "Theme Song of Love" with Della (Ding Dang)
- January 1, 2026 - Taichung: "Superman", "I Won't Let You Be Lonely" and "Just Friends" with Roselyn Liu
- January 31, 2026 - Kuala Lumpur: "Dear Stranger" with Xiao Bing Chih
- March 28, 2026 - Hong Kong: "This Is Love" and "Just Friends" with Roselyn Liu

== Tour dates ==
List of tour dates
Date	City	Country	Venue	Opening acts	Attendance
December 31, 2023	Taichung	Taiwan	Taichung Intercontinental Baseball Stadium	—N/a	150,000
January 1, 2024	Taichung	Taiwan	Taichung Intercontinental Baseball Stadium	Boom!	150,000
January 2, 2024	Taichung	Taiwan	Taichung Intercontinental Baseball Stadium	Mixer	150,000
January 5, 2024	Taichung	Taiwan	Taichung Intercontinental Baseball Stadium	Cosmos People	150,000
January 6, 2024	Taichung	Taiwan	Taichung Intercontinental Baseball Stadium	Boom!	150,000
January 7, 2024	Taichung	Taiwan	Taichung Intercontinental Baseball Stadium	GX (#GBOYSWAG + Xiao Bing Chih)	150,000
March 23, 2024	Kaohsiung	Taiwan	Kaohsiung National Stadium	Cosmos People	300,000 (Note: Rough estimate based on attendance for the third night.)
March 24, 2024	Kaohsiung	Taiwan	Kaohsiung National Stadium	Boom!	300,000
March 29, 2024	Kaohsiung	Taiwan	Kaohsiung National Stadium	GX (#GBOYSWAG + Xiao Bing Chih)	300,000
March 30, 2024	Kaohsiung	Taiwan	Kaohsiung National Stadium	Boom!	300,000
March 31, 2024	Kaohsiung	Taiwan	Kaohsiung National Stadium	Mixer	300,000
April 30, 2024	Hong Kong		Central Harbourfront Event Space	—N/a	140,000 (Note: Rough estimate based on attendance for the first night.)
May 3, 2024	Hong Kong		Central Harbourfront Event Space	—N/a	140,000
May 4, 2024	Hong Kong		Central Harbourfront Event Space	Boom!	140,000
May 5, 2024	Hong Kong		Central Harbourfront Event Space	Boom!	140,000
May 7, 2024	Hong Kong		Central Harbourfront Event Space	—N/a	140,000
May 8, 2024	Hong Kong		Central Harbourfront Event Space	GX (#GBOYSWAG + Xiao Bing Chih)	140,000
May 9, 2024 (Note: Postponed from May 1, 2024, due to bad weather.)	Hong Kong		Central Harbourfront Event Space	—N/a	140,000
May 18, 2024	Beijing	China	Beijing National Stadium	—N/a	—N/a
May 19, 2024	Beijing	China	Beijing National Stadium	Boom!	—N/a
May 21, 2024	Beijing	China	Beijing National Stadium	GX (#GBOYSWAG + Xiao Bing Chih)	—N/a
May 22, 2024	Beijing	China	Beijing National Stadium	Mixer	—N/a
May 24, 2024	Beijing	China	Beijing National Stadium	Jia Jia	—N/a
May 25, 2024	Beijing	China	Beijing National Stadium	Jia Jia	—N/a
May 26, 2024	Beijing	China	Beijing National Stadium	Cosmos People	—N/a
May 30, 2024	Beijing	China	Beijing National Stadium	Ray Huang; Arrow Wei; Ring	—N/a
May 31, 2024	Beijing	China	Beijing National Stadium	Boom!	—N/a
June 1, 2024	Beijing	China	Beijing National Stadium	Ann Bai	—N/a
July 1, 2024	Shenzhen	China	Shenzhen Universiade Sports Centre	Mixer	—N/a
July 2, 2024	Shenzhen	China	Shenzhen Universiade Sports Centre	GX (#GBOYSWAG + Xiao Bing Chih)	—N/a
July 3, 2024	Shenzhen	China	Shenzhen Universiade Sports Centre	Ray Huang	—N/a
July 5, 2024	Shenzhen	China	Shenzhen Universiade Sports Centre	Boom!	—N/a
July 6, 2024	Shenzhen	China	Shenzhen Universiade Sports Centre	Jia Jia	—N/a
July 7, 2024	Shenzhen	China	Shenzhen Universiade Sports Centre	Cosmos People	—N/a
July 31, 2024	Taiyuan	China	Shanxi Sports Centre Stadium	Boom!	200,000
August 2, 2024	Taiyuan	China	Shanxi Sports Centre Stadium	Ray Huang; Ring	200,000
August 3, 2024	Taiyuan	China	Shanxi Sports Centre Stadium	—N/a	200,000
August 4, 2024	Taiyuan	China	Shanxi Sports Centre Stadium	—N/a	200,000
September 6, 2024	Wuhan	China	Wuhan Sports Center Stadium	#GBOYSWAG	—N/a
September 7, 2024	Wuhan	China	Wuhan Sports Center Stadium	—N/a	—N/a
September 8, 2024	Wuhan	China	Wuhan Sports Center Stadium	Ray Huang	—N/a
September 10, 2024	Wuhan	China	Wuhan Sports Center Stadium	Boom!	—N/a
September 11, 2024	Wuhan	China	Wuhan Sports Center Stadium	Boom!	—N/a
September 27, 2024	Chengdu	China	Chengdu Dong'an Lake Sports Park Stadium	Ray Huang	140,000
September 28, 2024	Chengdu	China	Chengdu Dong'an Lake Sports Park Stadium	Volcano; Arrow Wei	140,000
September 30, 2024	Chengdu	China	Chengdu Dong'an Lake Sports Park Stadium	GX (#GBOYSWAG + Xiao Bing Chih)	140,000
October 4, 2024	Chengdu	China	Chengdu Dong'an Lake Sports Park Stadium	Boom!	140,000
November 10, 2024	Shanghai	China	Shanghai Stadium	Volcano; Arrow Wei	495,000
November 12, 2024	Shanghai	China	Shanghai Stadium	#GBOYSWAG	495,000
November 13, 2024	Shanghai	China	Shanghai Stadium	Xiao Bing Chih	495,000
November 15, 2024	Shanghai	China	Shanghai Stadium	Ray Huang; Ring	495,000
November 16, 2024	Shanghai	China	Shanghai Stadium	Volcano; Arrow Wei	495,000
November 17, 2024	Shanghai	China	Shanghai Stadium	Boom!	495,000
November 19, 2024	Shanghai	China	Shanghai Stadium	Mixer	495,000
November 20, 2024	Shanghai	China	Shanghai Stadium	Mixer	495,000
November 22, 2024	Shanghai	China	Shanghai Stadium	Boom!	495,000
November 23, 2024	Shanghai	China	Shanghai Stadium	Ray Huang	495,000
November 24, 2024	Shanghai	China	Shanghai Stadium	Roselyn Liu	495,000
December 28, 2024	Taoyuan	Taiwan	Rakuten Taoyuan Baseball Stadium	Fran	150,000
December 29, 2024	Taoyuan	Taiwan	Rakuten Taoyuan Baseball Stadium	Jia Jia	150,000
December 31, 2024	Taoyuan	Taiwan	Rakuten Taoyuan Baseball Stadium	—N/a	150,000
January 1, 2025	Taoyuan	Taiwan	Rakuten Taoyuan Baseball Stadium	Boom!	150,000
January 4, 2025	Taoyuan	Taiwan	Rakuten Taoyuan Baseball Stadium	Yile Lin	150,000
January 5, 2025	Taoyuan	Taiwan	Rakuten Taoyuan Baseball Stadium	Xiao Bing Chih	150,000
January 11, 2025	Singapore		Singapore National Stadium	Boom!	80,000 (Note: Rough estimate based on attendance for the first night.)
January 12, 2025	Singapore		Singapore National Stadium	Xiao Bing Chih; Mixer	80,000
February 22, 2025	Sydney	Australia	Accor Stadium	—N/a	—N/a
March 29, 2025	Las Vegas	United States	Allegiant Stadium	Xiao Bing Chih; Accusefive	—N/a
April 18, 2025	Tianjin	China	Tianjin Olympic Centre Stadium	—N/a	120,000 (Note: Rough estimate based on attendance for the first night.)
April 19, 2025	Tianjin	China	Tianjin Olympic Centre Stadium	Boom!	120,000
April 20, 2025	Tianjin	China	Tianjin Olympic Centre Stadium	Xiao Bing Chih	120,000
May 9, 2025	Hong Kong		Kai Tak Sports Park	—N/a	180,000
May 10, 2025	Hong Kong		Kai Tak Sports Park	Xiao Bing Chih	180,000
May 11, 2025	Hong Kong		Kai Tak Sports Park	Boom!	180,000
May 13, 2025	Hong Kong		Kai Tak Sports Park	Arrow Wei; Ring	180,000
May 23, 2025	Hangzhou	China	Hangzhou Olympic Sports Centre Stadium	Jia Jia	200,000
May 24, 2025	Hangzhou	China	Hangzhou Olympic Sports Centre Stadium	Boom!	200,000
May 25, 2025	Hangzhou	China	Hangzhou Olympic Sports Centre Stadium	Xiao Bing Chih	200,000
May 27, 2025	Hangzhou	China	Hangzhou Olympic Sports Centre Stadium	Arrow Wei; Ring	200,000
May 28, 2025	Hangzhou	China	Hangzhou Olympic Sports Centre Stadium	Mixer	200,000
June 13, 2025	Harbin	China	Harbin International Convention and Exhibition Centre Stadium	—N/a	90,000
June 14, 2025	Harbin	China	Harbin International Convention and Exhibition Centre Stadium	Jia Jia	90,000
June 15, 2025	Harbin	China	Harbin International Convention and Exhibition Centre Stadium	—N/a	90,000
June 27, 2025	Taipei	Taiwan	Taipei Dome	—N/a	320,000
June 28, 2025	Taipei	Taiwan	Taipei Dome	Boom!	320,000
June 29, 2025	Taipei	Taiwan	Taipei Dome	Cosmos People	320,000
July 4, 2025	Taipei	Taiwan	Taipei Dome	Xiao Bing Chih	320,000
July 5, 2025	Taipei	Taiwan	Taipei Dome	Jia Jia	320,000
July 6, 2025	Taipei	Taiwan	Taipei Dome	Ray Huang; Arrow Wei; Ring	320,000
July 11, 2025	Taipei	Taiwan	Taipei Dome	Mixer	320,000
July 12, 2025	Taipei	Taiwan	Taipei Dome	Roselyn Liu	320,000
July 25, 2025	Beijing	China	Beijing National Stadium	—N/a	1,300,000 (Note: Rough estimate based on attendance for the third night.)
July 26, 2025	Beijing	China	Beijing National Stadium	—N/a	1,300,000
July 27, 2025	Beijing	China	Beijing National Stadium	—N/a	1,300,000
August 1, 2025	Beijing	China	Beijing National Stadium	Ray Huang	1,300,000
August 2, 2025	Beijing	China	Beijing National Stadium	Arrow Wei	1,300,000
August 3, 2025	Beijing	China	Beijing National Stadium	Ring	1,300,000
August 6, 2025	Beijing	China	Beijing National Stadium	Roselyn Liu	1,300,000
August 8, 2025	Beijing	China	Beijing National Stadium	Ann Bai	1,300,000
August 9, 2025	Beijing	China	Beijing National Stadium	Xiao Bing Chih	1,300,000
August 10, 2025	Beijing	China	Beijing National Stadium	Cosmos People	1,300,000
August 15, 2025	Beijing	China	Beijing National Stadium	#GBOYSWAG	1,300,000
August 16, 2025	Beijing	China	Beijing National Stadium	Mixer	1,300,000
August 17, 2025	Beijing	China	Beijing National Stadium	Jia Jia	1,300,000
September 2, 2025	Shanghai	China	Shanghai Stadium	Arrow Wei; Ring	180,000
September 3, 2025	Shanghai	China	Shanghai Stadium	—N/a	180,000
September 4, 2025	Shanghai	China	Shanghai Stadium	Xiao Bing Chih	180,000
September 12, 2025	Guiyang	China	Guiyang Olympic Sports Centre Stadium	Xiao Bing Chih	135,000
September 13, 2025	Guiyang	China	Guiyang Olympic Sports Centre Stadium	Ray Huang	135,000
September 14, 2025	Guiyang	China	Guiyang Olympic Sports Centre Stadium	Ring	135,000
September 19, 2025	Changsha	China	Helong Sports Centre Stadium	Arrow Wei; Ring	—N/a
September 20, 2025	Changsha	China	Helong Sports Centre Stadium	Xiao Bing Chih	—N/a
September 21, 2025	Changsha	China	Helong Sports Centre Stadium	Ann Bai	—N/a
September 23, 2025	Changsha	China	Helong Sports Centre Stadium	Ray Huang	—N/a
October 17, 2025	Zhengzhou	China	Zhengzhou Olympic Sports Centre Stadium	Xiao Bing Chih	120,000
October 18, 2025	Zhengzhou	China	Zhengzhou Olympic Sports Centre Stadium	Arrow Wei	120,000
October 19, 2025	Zhengzhou	China	Zhengzhou Olympic Sports Centre Stadium	Ring	120,000
October 24, 2025	Xiamen	China	Xiamen Egret Stadium	Boom!	—N/a
October 25, 2025	Xiamen	China	Xiamen Egret Stadium	Ring	—N/a
October 26, 2025	Xiamen	China	Xiamen Egret Stadium	Ann Bai	—N/a
November 8, 2025	Shanghai	China	Shanghai Stadium	Ray Huang	360,000
November 9, 2025	Shanghai	China	Shanghai Stadium	Arrow Wei	360,000
November 10, 2025	Shanghai	China	Shanghai Stadium	Ring	360,000
November 14, 2025	Shanghai	China	Shanghai Stadium	Ann Bai	360,000
November 15, 2025	Shanghai	China	Shanghai Stadium	—N/a	360,000
November 16, 2025	Shanghai	China	Shanghai Stadium	GX (#GBOYSWAG + Xiao Bing Chih)	360,000
December 5, 2025	Guangzhou	China	Greater Bay Area Sports Centre	Arrow Wei	—N/a
December 6, 2025	Guangzhou	China	Greater Bay Area Sports Centre	Xiao Bing Chih	—N/a
December 7, 2025	Guangzhou	China	Greater Bay Area Sports Centre	#GBOYSWAG	—N/a
December 12, 2025	Guangzhou	China	Greater Bay Area Sports Centre	Ring	—N/a
December 14, 2025	Guangzhou	China	Greater Bay Area Sports Centre	Ray Huang	—N/a
December 15, 2025	Guangzhou	China	Greater Bay Area Sports Centre	Ann Bai	—N/a
December 27, 2025	Taichung	Taiwan	Taichung Intercontinental Baseball Stadium	Arrow Wei	150,000
December 28, 2025	Taichung	Taiwan	Taichung Intercontinental Baseball Stadium	Ann Bai	150,000
December 31, 2025	Taichung	Taiwan	Taichung Intercontinental Baseball Stadium	—N/a	150,000
January 1, 2026	Taichung	Taiwan	Taichung Intercontinental Baseball Stadium	Ray Huang; Ring	150,000
January 3, 2026	Taichung	Taiwan	Taichung Intercontinental Baseball Stadium	Boom!	150,000
January 4, 2026	Taichung	Taiwan	Taichung Intercontinental Baseball Stadium	Cosmos People	150,000
January 31, 2026	Kuala Lumpur	Malaysia	National Stadium Bukit Jalil	Xiao Bing Chih	55,000
March 25, 2026	Hong Kong		Kai Tak Sports Park	Boom!	
March 27, 2026	Hong Kong		Kai Tak Sports Park	Xiao Bing Chih	
March 28, 2026	Hong Kong		Kai Tak Sports Park	Mixer	
March 29, 2026	Hong Kong		Kai Tak Sports Park	#GBOYSWAG	
April 30, 2026	Beijing	China	Beijing National Stadium	Arrow Wei	
May 1, 2026	Beijing	China	Beijing National Stadium	Arrow Wei; Ring	
May 2, 2026	Beijing	China	Beijing National Stadium	Xiao Bing Chih	
May 3, 2026	Beijing	China	Beijing National Stadium	Ann Bai	
May 8, 2026	Beijing	China	Beijing National Stadium	Ring	
May 9, 2026	Beijing	China	Beijing National Stadium	Ray Huang	
May 10, 2026	Beijing	China	Beijing National Stadium	Cosmos People	
May 11, 2026	Beijing	China	Beijing National Stadium	—N/a	
May 15, 2026	Beijing	China	Beijing National Stadium	—N/a	
May 16, 2026	Beijing	China	Beijing National Stadium	Roselyn Liu	
May 17, 2026	Beijing	China	Beijing National Stadium	#GBOYSWAG	
May 18, 2026	Beijing	China	Beijing National Stadium	—N/a	
July 3, 2026	Taipei	Taiwan	Taipei Dome	Arrow Wei; Ring	
July 4, 2026	Taipei	Taiwan	Taipei Dome	Boom!	
July 5, 2026	Taipei	Taiwan	Taipei Dome	Edy Hsiao	
July 8, 2026	Taipei	Taiwan	Taipei Dome	Mixer	
July 12, 2026 (Matinee) (Note: Postponed from July 11, 2026 due to Typhoon Bavi. Opening act cancelled due to Typhoon Bavi.)	Taipei	Taiwan	Taipei Dome	—N/a	
July 12, 2026 (Note: Opening act cancelled due to Typhoon Bavi.)	Taipei	Taiwan	Taipei Dome	—N/a	
July 13, 2026 (Note: Postponed from July 10m 2026 due to Typhoon Bavi.)	Taipei	Taiwan	Taipei Dome	Cosmos People	
