= List of Mayday concert tours =

Mayday concert tours
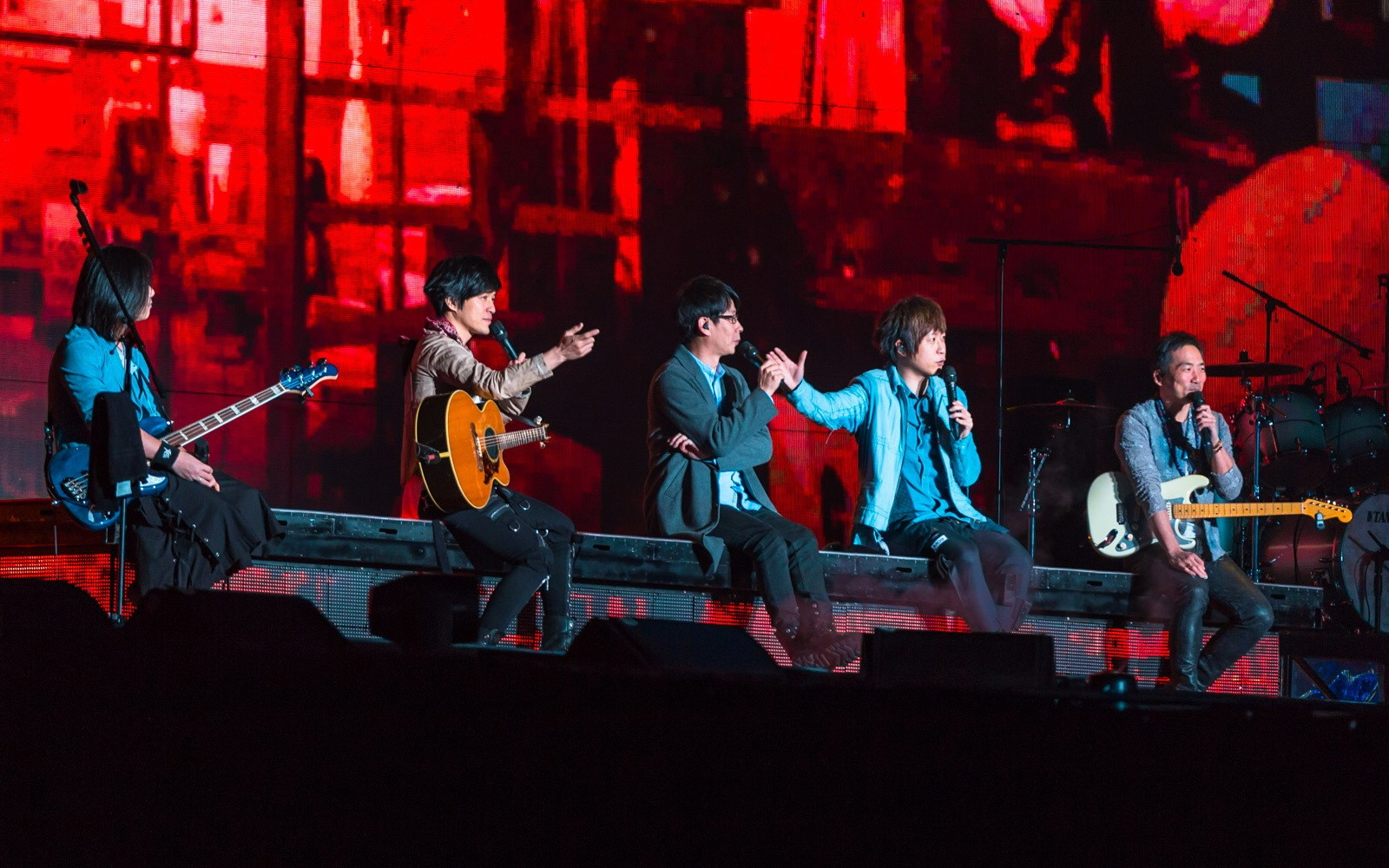
- Mayday in 2018
- Concert tours: 8
- Promotional concert tours: 3
- One-off concerts: 19

This is a list of concert tours by Taiwanese band Mayday (Chinese: 五月天). They have embarked on eight world tours, with the first being the Final Home World Tour (2004–2006). The Life Tour (2017–2019) attracted over 4,150,000 people with 122 shows across Asia, North America, Europe, and Oceania.

== Concert tours ==
List of concert tours
Title	Period	Continent(s)	Shows	Attendance	Ref.
Final Home World Tour	2004–2006	Asia; North America	14	—	
Jump! The World Tour	2007–2008	Asia; North America	23	—	
D.N.A World Tour	2009–2010	Asia; Oceania; North America	44	—	
Just Rock It! World Tour	2011–2020	Asia; Europe; Oceania; North America	93	—	
Nowhere World Tour	2011–2024	Asia; North America; Europe	104	2,600,000	
Life Tour	2017–2019	Asia; North America; Europe; Oceania	122	4,150,000	
Really Want To See You Tour	2020–2023	Asia; North America; Oceania; Europe	76	—	
5525 Back to That Day Tour	2023–2026	Asia; Oceania; North America	162	—	

== Promotional tours ==
Title	Date(s)	Location	Shows
100,000 Youths Stand Up Concert	August 12, 2000 – August 26, 2000	Taiwan	3
Where Are You Going Concert	August 18, 2001 – September 10, 2001	Asia	4
Sky Castle Comeback Concert	August 16, 2003 – June 13, 2004	Asia	3

== One-off concerts ==
Title	Date(s)	Venue	City
168th Concert	August 28, 1999	Taipei Municipal Stadium	Taipei
2003 Free Concert	November 22, 2003	National Taichung Theater	Taichung
Enrich Your Life Concert	October 23, 2004	Zhongshan Football Field	Taipei
The Sky Above Concert	November 11, 2005	Taipei 101 Observation Deck	Taipei
I Suddenly Want to See Your Concert	January 1, 2008	National Taiwan University Sports Center	Taipei
2008 Concert	December 13–14, 2008	Zhongshan Football Field	Taipei
Mayday Love Each Other Macau Concert	February 21, 2009	Cotai Arena	Macau
