= Jia Jia =

Jia Jia may refer to:

- Jia Jia (dissident) (born 1951), a jailed Chinese dissident
- Jia Jia (singer) (born 1983), a Taiwanese aboriginal singer

== Others ==
- Jia Jia (giant panda) (1978–2016), a giant panda that resided in Hong Kong
- Jia Jia, a giant panda that currently resides in River Safari, Singapore
