= Walking in the Air (disambiguation) =

"Walking in the Air" is a song by Howard Blake, which appeared in the 1982 film The Snowman.

Other uses:

- Walking in the Air: The Greatest Ballads, a 2011 compilation album by Nightwish
- Walking in the Air (Chloë Agnew album), from 2004

== See also ==
- Walking on Air (disambiguation)
