= Clarence Hui =

Hong Kong musician, actor, and choreographer

- Born: Hong Kong
- Occupations: songwriter; lyricist; arranger; director

Chinese name
- Traditional Chinese: 許願
- Simplified Chinese: 许愿
Transcriptions

Clarence Hui (Chinese: 许愿; pinyin: Xu Yuan) is a Hong Kong songwriter, producer, choreographer, actor and author, best known for his collaborations with Leslie Cheung Kwok-wing, Sandy Lam, Jacky Cheung, for his work as a choreographer at TVB, and as the author of Walking on Air. Hui was most active in the 1980s and 1990s writing Cantopop songs creating hits, including 今生今世 ("In My Lifetime"), 野花 ("Wildflower"), and 爱上一个不回家的人.

== Early life ==
Hui attended Simon Fraser University in Canada as a performing arts student. He was mentored by musical theater master Grace Macdonald, which led him to become a stage actor. Throughout his career, he has been influenced by both traditional Chinese culture and Hong Kong pop music. After meeting a TVB producer in Vancouver, he signed a talent contract with TVB in Hong Kong, afterwards assisting in music and dance production for their shows.

== Career ==
After returning to Hong Kong, Hui was hired by TVB, his official entry into the Hong Kong music scene. He contributed to the production of concerts and variety shows. His first assignment was to work with Leslie Cheung, who would later become a musical collaborator. Hui shared his expertise with his peers in the music industry, helping them develop their stage careers. Over time, he became a mentor in Hong Kong, actively participating in the development of Hong Kong pop music. His students include names such as Sandy Lam, Jacky Cheung, Aaron Kwok, Jordan Chan, G.E.M., and Della Ding.

=== Infinity and Beyond 2022 ===
In 2022, Hui became a coach on the Chinese television singing show Infinity and Beyond 2022.

== Walking on Air ==
In 2023, Hui published his first book, 离地半尺 (Walking on Air), to broaden the knowledge and awareness of Cantopop local Hong Kong music scene. The book covers the Hong Kong music market during the 1970s and 1980s. Hui describes the creative process from inception, relating stories of the inspiration for each song and how it was written. He dedicates the book to the late Richard Lam Chun-keung, a prolific Cantopop lyricist and his "brother in music."
