= Simple Life Festival =

The Simple Life Festival (Chinese: 簡單生活節) is a cultural event held in Taiwan every two years. The festival is initially organized by two Taiwanese musicians: Jonathan Lee and Landy Chang since December, 2006. In the Simple Life Festival, its activities consist of music performance, book sharing, creative markets, and so on. In addition to large numbers of performance from singers and bands, the Simple Life Festival also provides a place for local farmers, designers of cloths or goods, and artistic creators to meet with each other. It is a platform for non-profit organizations to express their opinions, following with its goal to capture the most beautiful people and scene in Taiwan.

== Central belief ==
“There is a corner in everyone’s mind dreaming of a simple and natural life. We hope (through the Simple Life Festival) we can aggregate diverse creative elements, and then helps this society to look for innovative industry power.” – Landy Chang

According to Landy Chang, the Simple Life Festival is not only a music festival; instead, based on the core spirit of music festival, the Simple Life Festival further extends the notion, and covers wider topics. It is composed of multiple concepts, including some international trendy issues, the launch of creative market, downshifting, the thought of doing something you like, and make something you like rewarding.

== History ==
Year	Theme	Place
2006	‘Doing something you like, and make something you like rewarding’	Taipei
2008	‘Simply Smile’	Taipei
2010	‘WE ARE BEAUTIFUL’	Taipei
2012	‘WE ARE YOUNG SHOULD BE WILD’	Taipei
2014	‘WE WILL’	Taipei
2015	‘Simple Life of Wandering in the City’	Taichung
2018	‘A Simple Day’	Taipei
2020	‘Bye Bye 2020' & 'Let's Fly To Original Dream’	Taipei
2023	‘Everything Is Possible’	Taipei

== Performances ==
=== 2nd December 2023 – Huashan 1914 Creative Park ===
Lumos Stage (光舞台)	Levitate Stage (雲舞台)	Legacy Stage	StreetVoice Stage (街聲舞台)
LÜCY; Pei‑Yu Hung; Accusefive; Naiwen Yang; Lala Hsu	We Save Strawberries; Huang Yuhan; Chou Hsiao-Yueh; Icyball (zh); Enno Cheng	?te x Robot Swing; SoulFa; A_Root; Lao Wang Band; Huang Jie; Luan Tan-Ah Xiang feat. 孫盛媛	Penglai Xianshan; Tang Yimei; Midnight Midnight oo‑Lâu; Bremen Entertainment Inc. wannasleep

=== 3rd December 2023 – Huashan 1914 Creative Park ===
Lumos Stage (光舞台)	Levitate Stage (雲舞台)	Legacy Stage	StreetVoice Stage (街聲舞台)
Jerry Li; The Crane; Lexie Liu feat. YELLOW; Sandee Chan; Yoasobi	Mango Jump; Theseus; LINION feat. 劉柏辛; JADE; Faye	The Dinosaur's Skin; DSPS; ChuNoodle; VH (Vast & Hazy); Ma Nien-Hsien; Sheng-Xiang Band feat. 米莎; MC HotDog ^{(as surprise act ImSoBig)}	Khuann Jit Tsa Am; Zhuang Ka Ren; Yufu (歌手); Yappy; Mong Tong; Gummy B

== See also ==
- List of music festivals in Taiwan
