= Walking on Air =

Walking on Air or Walkin' on Air may refer to:

== Music ==
- "Walking on Air" (Katy Perry song), 2013
- "Walking on Air" (Anise K song), 2012
- "Walking on Air" (Kerli song), 2008
- Walkin' on Air, a 1987 album by Bobbysocks
- "Walking on Air", a 1988 song by Samantha Fox from the album I Wanna Have Some Fun
- "Walking on Air", a 1991 song by Orchestral Manoeuvres in the Dark from the album Sugar Tax
- "Walking on Air", a 1995 song by King Crimson from Thrak
- "Walking on Air", a 2001 song by the Bee Gees from This Is Where I Came In
- "Walking on Air", a 2016 song by Radio Dept.
- "Walking on Air", a 2022 song by PG Roxette
- "Sooner or Later (Walkin' on Air)", a 1999 song by the Moody Blues from Strange Times

== Films ==
- Walking on Air (1936 film), directed by Joseph Santley
- Walking on Air (1946 film), directed by Aveling Ginever
- Walking on Air, American musical film starring Maudie Edwards

== Other uses ==
- "Walking on Air" (book), a book by Clarence Hui

== See also ==
- "Walking in the Air", a song from the 1982 animated film The Snowman
