= B'in Music =

Taiwanese record label

- Founded: 1 July 2006; 20 years ago
- Founder: Mayday
- Genre: Mandopop
- Country of origin: Taiwan
- Location: Taipei
- Official website: www.bin-music.com.tw/index

B'in Music (Chinese: 相信音樂), also known as Believe in Music International Limited (Chinese: 相信音樂國際股份有限公司), is a Taiwan-based recording label and live production company. B'in Music's artists include acts such as Mayday, Jonathan Lee, and Victor Wong. B'in's live division, B'in Live, hosts an average of 900 events annually, including concerts for Coldplay, Yoasobi, OneRepublic, Bruno Mars, Blackpink, and BTS. In 2024, B'in Live reached a record-high revenue of NT $3.15 billion (US$98.91 million).

== History ==
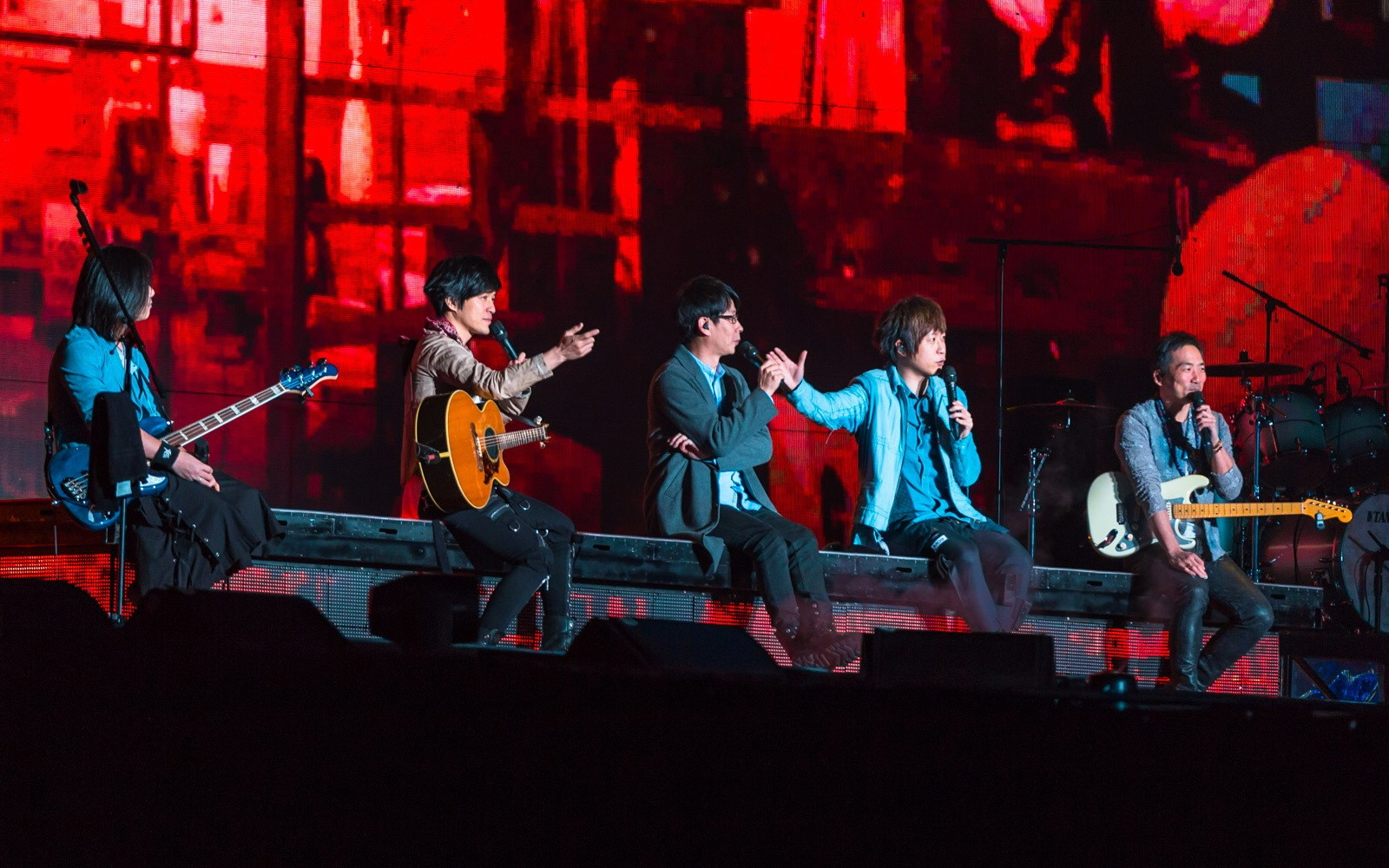
Mayday on their Life Tour

In 2006, Taiwanese rock band Mayday left their longtime label Rock Records to set up their own record label with former Rock Records executives Chen Yongzhi and Xie Zhifen. On 1 July 2006, B'in Music was formally established in Taipei, Taiwan.

B'in Music announced a partnership with Universal Music Group in 2010 to promote and distribute Taiwanese artists and music across China. Sunny Chang, then-managing director of Universal Music Greater China, announced the deal, stating that "B’in Music’s pop artist roster is so fresh, young and talented. We’re excited to help promote these stars across the Mandarin-language markets in our region and, in particular, China, whose music fans are always searching for new artists to explore and adore.”

As physical album sales declined across the music industry in favor of streaming and digital sales, B'in Music's focus turned to live performances to be its primary revenue stream. In 2014, Yu-Yang Chou was appointed the chairman and chief executive officer of a new live production division, B’in Live.

Mayday and other B'in artists held a 2015 New Year's concert at the intersection of Kaixuan and Ersheng Road, the site of the 2014 Kaohsiung gas explosions.

During the COVID-19 pandemic, B'in gave out 6,000 free tickets as a gesture of gratitude to frontline workers in Taoyuan, Taichung, and Tainan. Demand for live performances increased tremendously after the pandemic's space restrictions were lifted, as people sought in-person experiences. B'in Live's revenues soared as people attended and often re-attended concerts on the same tour.

== Artist roster ==
This list includes current and former artists who have released music under a B'in Music label.

=== B'in Music ===
- Mayday
- Rene Liu
- Jonathan Lee
- Victor Wong
- Jia Jia
- Ding Dang
- Ann Bai
- Tarcy Su
- Cosmos People
- Accusefive
- Energy
- Fish Leong
- Yen-j
- Popu Lady
- 831
- Hsiao Ping-chi
- Li Jianqing
- Xiao Bing Chih
- GBOYSWAG
- HUSH
- Tizzy Bac
- Mixer
- GX

=== iBeams ===
- Ray Huang
- Ring
- Arrow Wei
- Fran
- BOOM!

== See also ==
- List of record labels
