= Greater Bay Area Culture and Sports Center =

Sports complex in Guangzhou, China

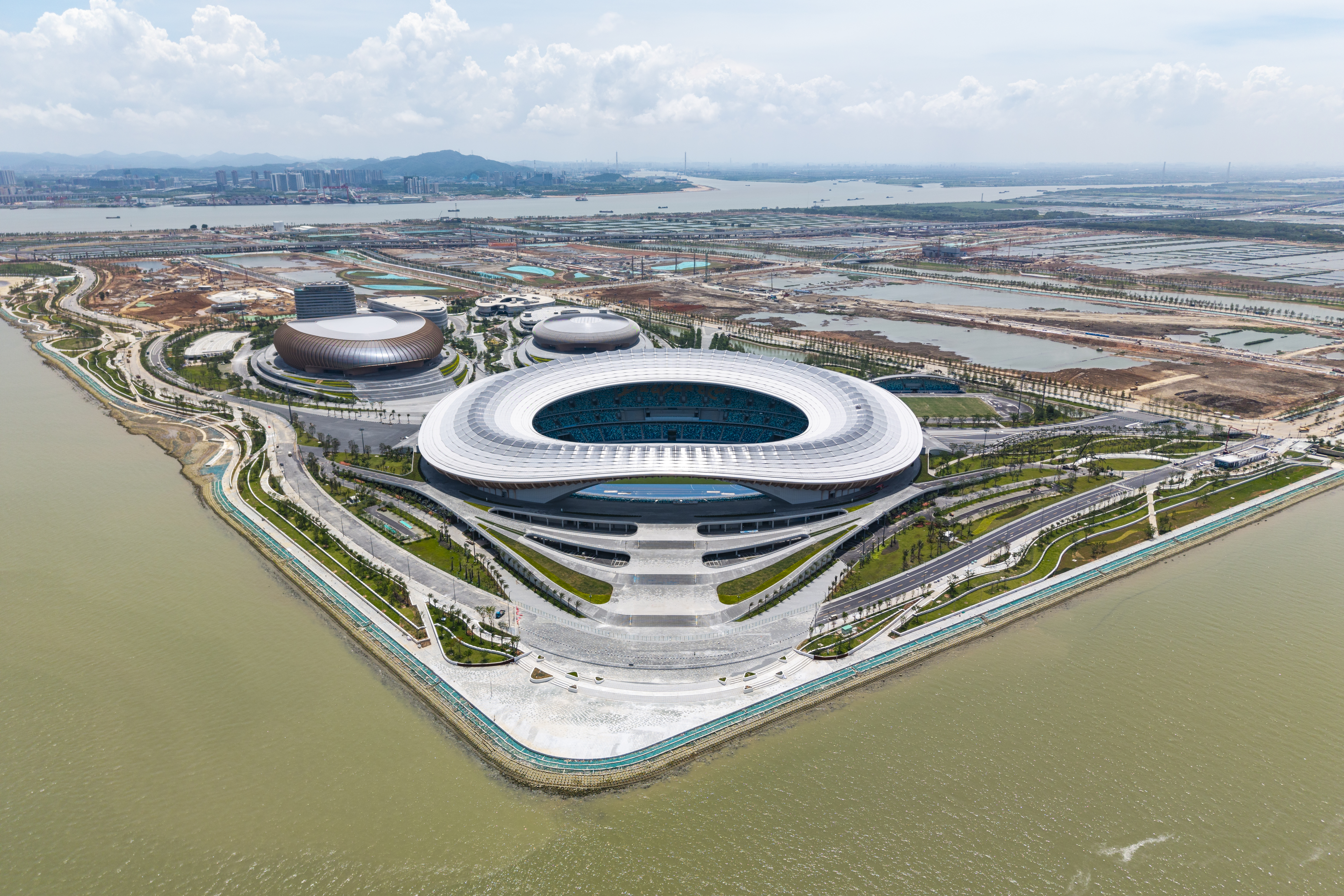
- Location within Guangzhou's Nansha District
- Location: Nansha District, Guangzhou, Guangdong, China
- Coordinates: 22.580125°N 113.650260°E
- Owner: Nansha District Bureau of Culture & Sports
- Operator: China Resources Culture & Sports Development
- Capacity: 60,000 (stadium); 20,000 (indoor arena); 4,000 (aquatics center)
- Surface: Hybrid grass (Desso GrassMaster)
- Field size: 105m × 68m (football pitch)
- Public transit: Guangzhou Metro Line 18 (via Nanzhong Intercity)

Construction
- Groundbreaking: 31 August 2023; 2 years ago
- Opened: 30 June 2025; 14 months ago
- Cost: CN¥8 billion (US$1.12 billion) (entire complex)
- Architects: Zaha Hadid Architects; Guangdong Provincial Architectural Design Institute
- General contractors: China Construction Eighth Engineering Bureau (stadium); China Construction Third Engineering Division (other venues)

The Greater Bay Area Culture and Sports Center (Chinese: 大湾区文化体育中心) is a multi-purpose sports complex in Nansha District, Guangzhou, China. The complex includes a 60,000-seat multi-purpose stadium named Greater Bay Area Culture and Sports Centre Stadium, a 20,000-seat indoor arena, a 4,000-seat aquatics center, and extensive outdoor sports facilities, positioning it as a key venue for international competitions and cultural events in Guangdong.

== Construction ==
In August 2023, the groundbreaking ceremony was attended by Guangzhou officials and developers. In December 2023, all 1,019 foundation piles were completed in 88 days, breaking national speed records. On 11 March 2024, the main stadium structure was completed in 20 days ahead of schedule. In January 2025, all 3 venues were illuminated for the first time. The complex went into trial operations on 30 March 2025, and then proper operations began on 30 June 2025.

== Events ==
The complex is expected to host sporting events and international concerts.

The arena's first public event was a round of the finals of the Guangzhou Basketball City League on 10 August 2025. The stadium's first public event was a match of the Guangdong Football Super League on 23 August 2025. From 5 to 15 December 2025, the stadium held its first concerts as part of Mayday's 5525 Back to That Day Tour.
