= Jia Jia (dissident) =

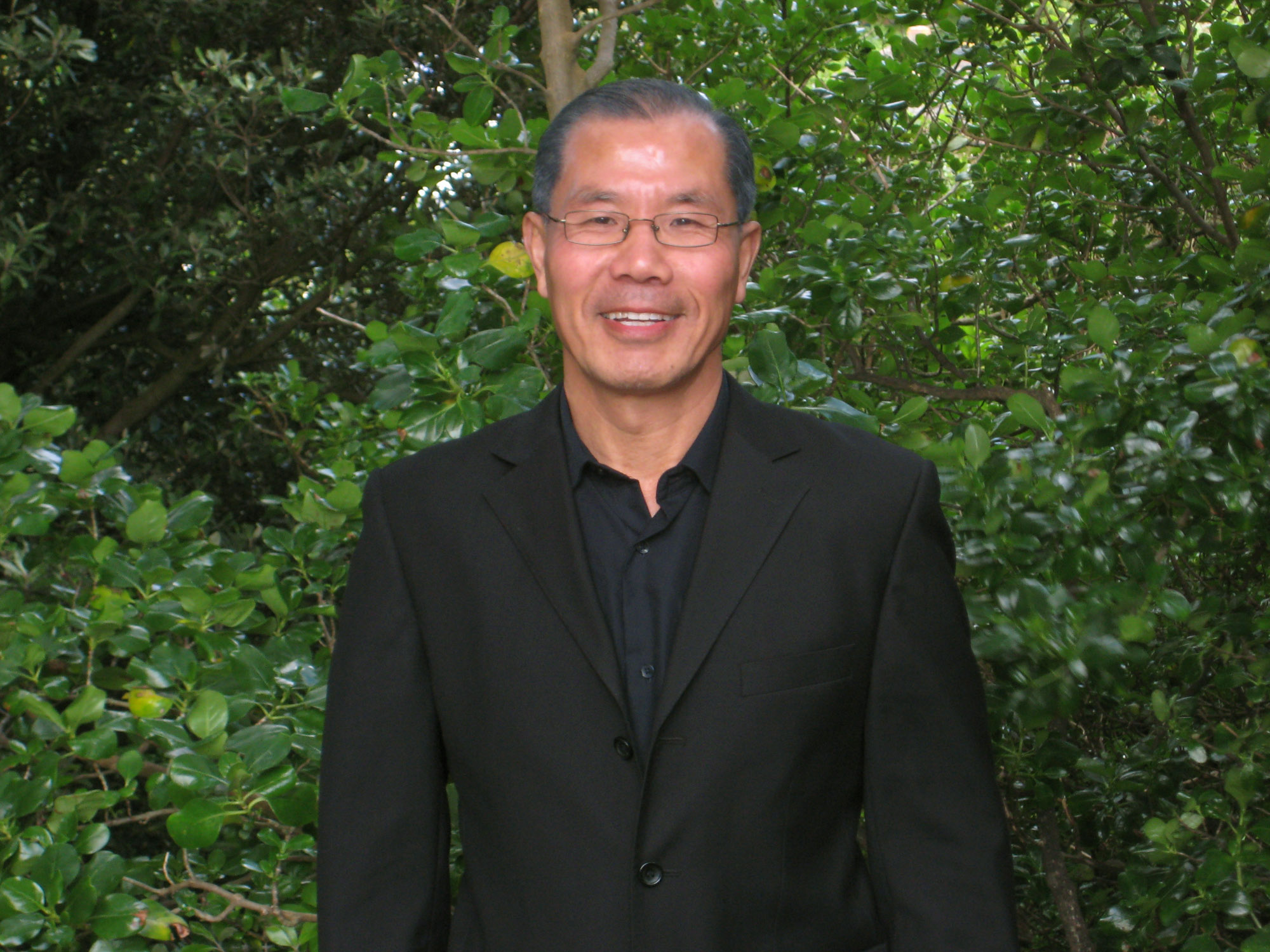
Jia Jia in 2008

Jia Jia (simplified Chinese: 贾甲; traditional Chinese: 賈甲; pinyin: Jiǎ Jiǎ), born in 1951, Tianjin, a former General Secretary of the Shanxi Provincial Association of Scientists and Technology Experts (Chinese: 中国山西省科技专家协会) before he left China in 2006 and was granted political refugee status by UN refugee commission, and accepted by New Zealand as a permanent resident.

== Arrested by Chinese government ==
On 22 October 2009, Jia Jia returned to China arriving at Beijing Capital International Airport from New Zealand, on a mission to bring democracy to the Chinese people. He was arrested at the airport.

== Sentenced to jail for 8 years ==
On 13 May 2011, Jia Jia has been sentenced to jail for 8 years and deprived of political rights for 2 years under the name of ‘subversion of state power’.
