= Ann (singer) =

Taiwanese singer-songwriter (born 1991)

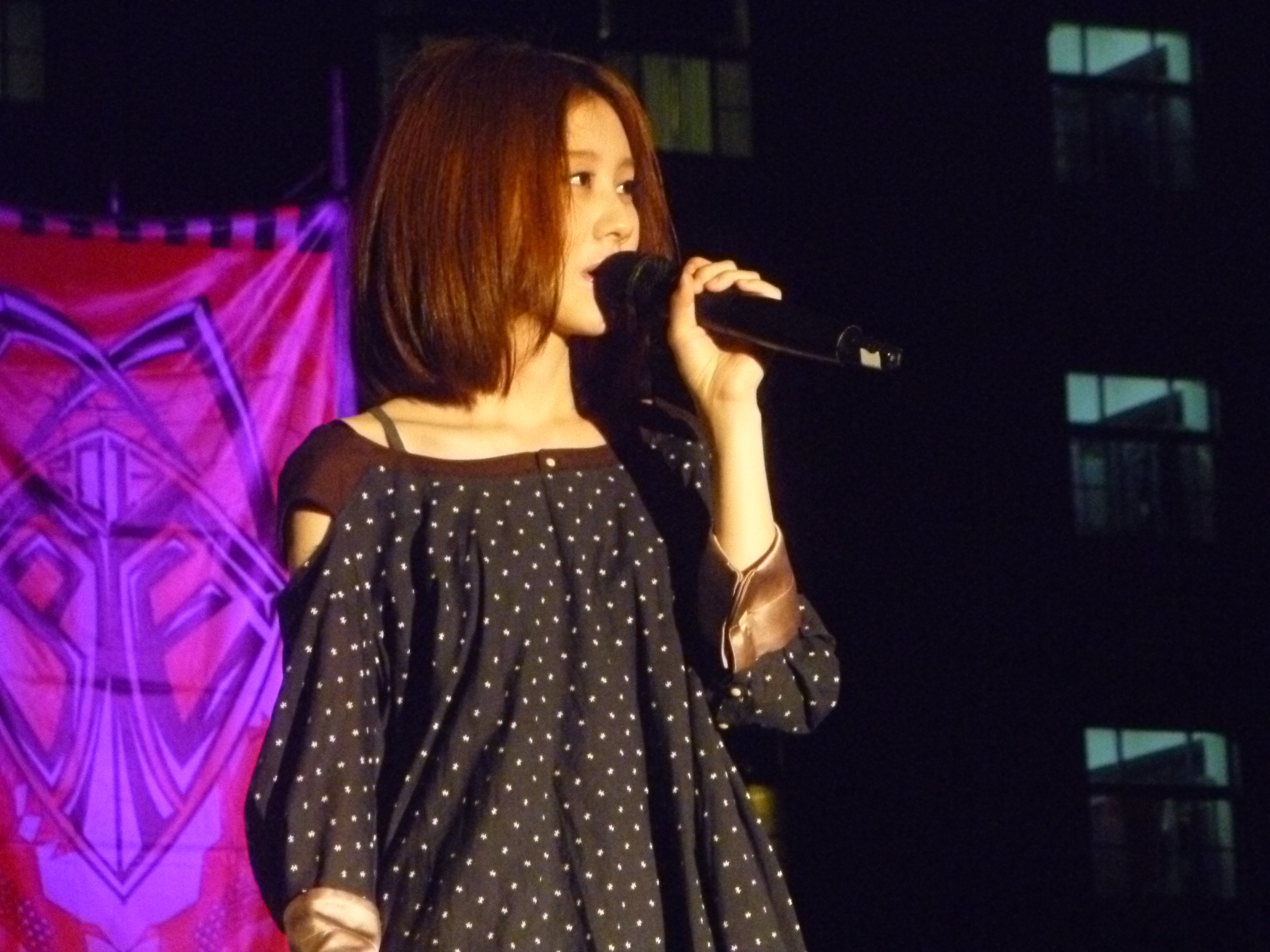
- Ann performing at the Southern Taiwan University of Technology graduation concert in 2013
- Born: 白安嚴; 27 September 1991 (age 34); Taipei, Taiwan
- Occupations: Singer, songwriter
- Years active: 2012–present

Chinese name
- Traditional Chinese: 白安
Transcriptions
Standard Mandarin
- Hanyu Pinyin: Bái ān
- Musical career
- Origin: Taiwan
- Genres: Mandopop, Indie rock, Folk
- Instruments: Vocals, piano, guitar
- Label: B'in Music

Ann (Chinese: 白安; pinyin: Bái ān; born 27 September 1991) is a Taiwanese singer-songwriter. She released her debut album, Catcher in the Rye, in 2012. She has been publishing her songs on the internet since 2008 and was later discovered and signed by B'in Music, a major record label in Taiwan. Her family is from Manchuria.

== Biography ==
Ann was born in Taipei, Taiwan and started learning musical instruments, including guitar and keyboard instruments, while attending Muzha Elementary School in Taipei. She also joined the school's choir. At 13, she became interested in the creation of music, and she began publishing musical works on the online platform StreetVoice at the age of 16. In 2008, she performed at the Simple Life Festival and was discovered by musical artist Jonathan Lee, who was serving as a panel judge at the event. In 2012, she released her first album Catcher in the Rye to a positive reception within the Chinese-language music sphere, with Jacky Cheung and Alan Tam publicly praising her for the uniqueness of her voice and for her creative talent. In 2013, she was nominated for the Best New Artist category in the 24th Golden Melody Awards for this album. On 14 December 2018, Ann released her third album 1990s after a gap of 4 years. In October 2019, Ann released an extended play recording entitled 44 Days.

== Discography ==
- The Catcher in the Rye (麥田捕手), released 21 December 2012
- What's Next? (接下來是什麼), released 5 September 2014
- 1990s, released 14 December 2018
- 44 Days (EP) (44天), released 29 October 2019
- All About You (沒有人寫歌給你過吧), released 31 August 2022
- Eight Day (星期八), released 25 October 2025
