= Energy (Taiwanese band) =

Taiwanese boy band

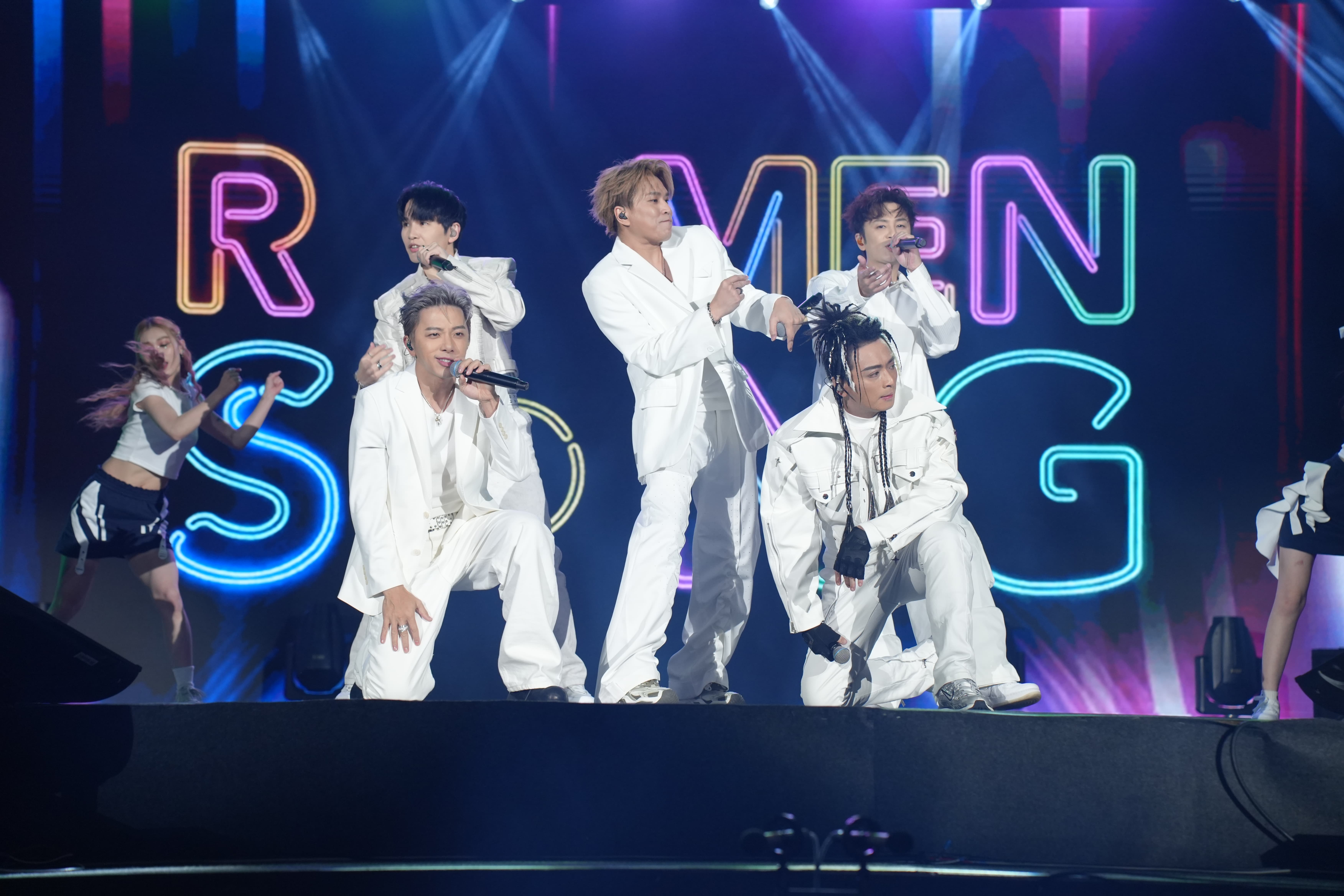
- Energy at 2024 Christmasland in New Taipei City

Background information
- Origin: Taipei, Taiwan
- Genres: Mandopop; dance-pop; pop rock; hip hop
- Years active: 2002–2009; 2024–present
- Labels: Universal Music Taiwan; B'in Music
- Members: Milk; Edy; Toro; Kunda; Shuwei
- Past members: Xiao Gang

Energy is a Taiwanese boy band formed in 2002. The original band consisted of five members, Milk, Edy, Toro, Kunda and Shuwei. Toro and Milk originally left the band in 2003 and 2005 respectively. Xiao Gang joined the band in mid-2007 before the band announced its hiatus in 2009.

On January 2, 2024, B'in Music announced that they have signed the band and Energy will be making a return to the music scene with its original members. They released the single "Friday Night" in July of the same year, which was ranked the number one song of 2024 by Taiwanese radio station Hit FM.

== History ==
=== 2002–2003: Career beginnings and breakthrough ===
Five-member Energy debuted with a Rapcore sound uncommon to the Taiwanese Mandopop scene. The band's up-tempo tracks such as "Let Go" (放手) were accompanied by dance choreography comparable to that of Korean boy bands. Energy also performed ballads such as "Love Me for Another Day" (多爱我一天) and "One Day" (某年某月某一天). The band's popularity grew at a time where several other highly successful Taiwanese boy bands such as 5566 and K One emerged.

Energy's first studio album Energy! Come On! was released within the same year of the band's formation. The cover of Korean boy band Shinhwa's "Come On" received huge publicity in Taiwanese pop culture due to its catchy hook. The album featured mostly up-tempo tracks, but also contained ballads such as "Loving You the Second Time" (第二次愛上你) and "Never Say Goodbye" (永遠不說再見).

Energy's second album Invincible featured the title track "Invincible" (無懈可擊), which much like "Come On", was also a cover of a Korean song, this time being jtL's "Enter The Dragon". The single "Love Me for Another Day" (多愛我一天) remains as the most well received track throughout the band's history. "Boom" was used in a Converse commercial, the track being a cover of metal band Saliva's song of the same name. "Ra-Men Song" was used in an instant noodles commercial, the track featuring Singapore's Terry Lee rapping alongside Energy in English. Ady suffered serious injuries during the filming of a music video for this album and had to give their Asian tour a miss.

Energy's third and final album as a five-member band E3 contained the single "Capturing Evil" (退魔錄), a song used to promote an online computer game. Toro left the band not long after the album was released and became part of a new Mandopop trio "Typhoon" (Chinese: 台風). Typhoon has only one album to date, titled Overflow (Chinese: 天大地大).

=== 2004–2006: Energy 4 Ever, Hey You!, and Final Fantasy ===
Four-member Energy released a Greatest Hits Collection Energy 4 Ever containing four new tracks and two mash-ups of their previous singles. A Limited Edition release of this album included a VCD promoting Michael's Dance, a television drama serial that the band was shooting at that time. Touring by the band proved to be "tough" as Toro's lines had to be covered by the remaining members. Energy expressed during promotional events that they were optimistic, even joking about Toro's departure.

In 2004, Energy starred in the Taiwanese idol drama serial "Michael's Dance" (Chinese: 米迦勒之舞). The show's soundtrack contained songs recorded by Energy, including "Hey You", "I Hear the Angels Sing" (我聽見天使歌唱) and "Dark Times" (黑暗時期). "Let's Go" (一起走吧) features Taiwanese singer Show Lo (羅志祥), a personal friend of the band. Penny recorded a solo track for the show titled It Isn't Raining (Chinese: 天空沒有下雨). Although the song was not included on the soundtrack or any other album, Penny performed it during Energy's FINAL FANTASY concert.

The 2005 album FINAL FANTASY (最後的樂園) was the final album of four-member Energy. The singles "Heaven and Earth" (天與地) and "Taste of Tears" (眼淚的味道) were released to moderate success. The album was criticised for containing an excess of freestyle battle and phony sentimentality. The music video for Heaven and Earth depicted Ady trapped in a castle and the other three members saving him, seemingly hinting that Ady was leaving the band much like Only Me and Toro's departure. A documentary of the fans' efforts to stop the band from disbanding was released in the second edition of "FINAL FANTASY".

After a series of FINAL FANTASY concerts, Milk turned to his solo career of hosting, advertising, and recording an EP titled "Puppet", released in 2006. Milk released a solo album in 2008. Energy attended several award ceremonies without Milk, performing their creatively written ballad "We" (我們) as a three-member band.

=== 2006–2009: New Generation and Born to Be Bad ===
After a year of inactivity, three-member Energy released an album New Generation (猩人类) in 2006, featuring a rock influenced sound and a new band logo. The music video of title track "New Generation" (猩人类) depicted the band dancing with extended arms, matching the album's ape-man theme. Penny wrote the lyrics for power ballad "Love Went Out of Control" (愛失控), although its tune was a cover of "One" by Korean boy band TVXQ. "Quick Kill" (秒殺) was written by Taiwanese rock band Mayday such as Ashin, Stone and Monster from B'in Music, who also sings and appears in the music video. "Defeat" (打敗) was written by Taiwanese singer Chou Chuan-huing (Chinese: 周傳雄), who also sings on the track. China's release of the album had two tracks removed due to "inappropriate content", one of which being Quick Kill. The band expressed that it was a "pity that the China audience don't get to enjoy the full album".

In 2007, Xiao Gang joined Energy to form a four-member group. Xiao Gang had previously choreographed dance routines for Energy and K ONE, and is Penny's personal friend. Energy described the addition of Xiao Gang as a move to make the band "more complete".

Energy's 2007 album Born To Be Bad (天生反骨) received generally positive reviews, mainly praising the band's improved vocals. The title track "Born To Be Bad" (天生反骨) received huge radio play and publicity because of its unique mix of hip-hop and rock. Energy's recording company didn't want the band to incorporate a dance routine for this song, but Energy convinced them otherwise. For this dance, Energy created an exercise routine named the "Requires three thousand lives" (Chinese: 要你三千命). The lyrics of ballad "Stars" (星空) were written by Joe and Ady. Another ballad "Promise Me" (答應我) had a musical style similar to that of Energy's early years.

The group announced its hiatus in 2009.

=== 2023–present: Reunion ===
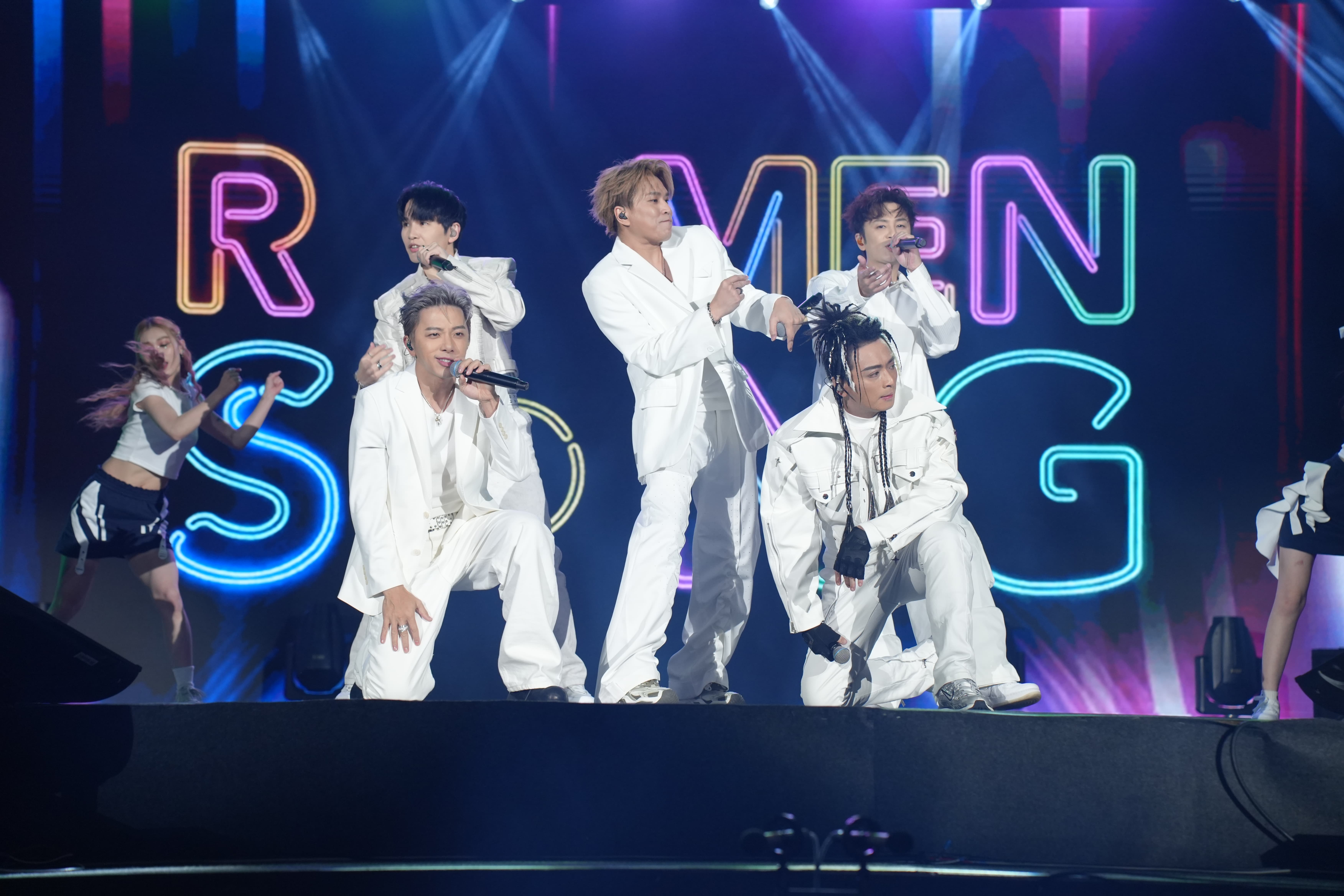
Energy performing at Christmasland 2024 in New Taipei City

On April 2, 2023, they reunited for a special guest appearance at Mayday's Noah's Ark 10th Anniversary concert tour, presenting song "Letting Go" and covering Mayday's song "Sun Wukong".

B'in Music's social media platforms announced Energy's full return to the music scene with its original five members by unveiling their official social media accounts on January 1, 2024. Energy made their first television appearance since their hiatus, performing on TTV Super Star (Chinese: 超級巨星紅白藝能大賞), the annual Chinese New Year's Eve television special produced by Taiwanese broadcaster TTV.

The group announced a temporary hiatus, after confirmation of controversies where members Shuwei and Kunda were suspected of evading military service in Taiwan. Activities and public performances will resume after 30 June 2026.

== Members ==
=== Current ===
Stage name		Birth name		Date of birth
English	Chinese	Romanized	Chinese	Date of birth
Shuwei	書偉	Chang Shu Wei	張書偉	November 4, 1980 (age 46)
KunDa	坤達	Hsieh Kun Da	謝坤達	March 18, 1982 (age 44)
Edy	阿弟	Hsiao Ching Hung	蕭景鴻	July 21, 1982 (age 44)
Milk	牛奶	Yeh Nai Wen	葉乃文	September 2, 1979 (age 47)
Toro		Kuo Wei Yun	郭葦昀	October 2, 1981 (age 45)

=== Former ===
Stage name		Birth name		Date of birth
English	Chinese	Romanized	Chinese	Date of birth
Ice	小剛	Tang Chen Kang	唐振剛	October 13, 1983 (age 43)

== Discography ==
Studio albums

- Energy! Come On! (2002)
- Energy / Unassailable (2003)
- Invulnerable (2003)
- E3 (2003)
- Energy 4 Ever (2004)
- Hey You! (2004)
- Final Fantasy (2005)
- New Generation (2006)
- Born to Be Bad (2007)
- Here I Am (2024)
- All in (2025)
