= Walking on Air (book) =

2023 book by Clarence Hui

- Author: Clarence Hui
- Original title: 离地半尺
- Cover artist: Shui You Yin Wen Hua
- Language: Chinese
- Publisher: Taihai Publisher
- Publication date: 2023
- Publication place: China
- ISBN: 978-7-5168-3465-7

Walking on Air (Chinese: 离地半尺) is a book written by Clarence Hui in 2023. It describes songs in the Cantopop genre. The book covers the Hong Kong music market during the 1970s and 1980s. Hui describes the creative process from inception, relating stories of the inspiration for each song and how it was written. A book launch was held in Beijing by CNTIME with Hui attendance. Hui stated Hong Kong, which previously did not have deep cultural roots, developed a rich culture.
