= Life Tour =

2017–19 concert tour by Mayday

- Tour by Mayday
- Associated album: History of Tomorrow
- Start date: March 18, 2017
- End date: January 6, 2019
- No. of shows: 122
- Attendance: 4,150,000
- Box office: US$250 million

Mayday concert chronology
- Just Rock It！World Tour (2011–2020); Life Tour (2017–2019); Really Want to See You Tour (2020–2023)

The Life Tour (Chinese: 人生無限公司巡迴演唱會) was the tenth concert tour by Taiwanese-band Mayday, in support of the band's ninth studio album History of Tomorrow (2016). The tour began on March 18, 2017, in Kaohsiung, Taiwan, and concluded on January 6, 2019, in Taichung, Taiwan, comprising 122 concerts. It is one of the most-attended concert tours.

== Background ==
On December 31, 2016, during their show in Taipei, Mayday announced their brand new headlining tour under name of Life Tour, which would kick off in Kaohsiung, Taiwan on March 18, 2017.

After tickets went on sale for the Kaohsiung show on January 21, it sells-out in just few minutes, resulting in one extra date being added. Furthermore, the band also announced shows in China. On May 31 the band announced seven dates for North America. In late October, the band announced shows in Paris and London. On March 5, 2018, the band announced shows in Melbourne and Sydney. On September 22, 2018, the band announced the last 10 shows in Taichung which will begin on December 22, 2018. The tour will be conclude on January 6, 2019.

Due to overwhelming demand, the extra shows were added in Kaohsiung, Singapore, Taoyuan, Macau, Suzhou, Changsha, Hong Kong, Tianjin and Changzhou.

== Concert synopsis ==
The concert begin with Mayday performing "Party Animal". "Best Day of My Life", "OAOA", "Enter Battle", "Here, After, Us" and "Superman" are subsequently performed. Between sets and costume changes, interlude videos which starring Huang Bo and Mayday, were played on the LED Screen. "You’re Not Truly Happy", "Cheers", "Brotherhood" were performed next, which then seamlessly transition into "Life Co.Ltd". During this part, the band would doing acoustic performance by guitar or short talk with fans. The next act the bassist, Masa, appeared on the left of the stage, performed the first verse of "Almost Famous" with piano. The vocalist, Ashin lifted up then and performed the rest of the song. "The Unbroken Part of My Heart", "Contentment", "Sun Wukong", "Life of Planet" and covered "The Dark Knight" from the collaboration of Ashin and JJ Lin. "Tough" were performed next.

Another costume change took place, and the show continued with Mayday performing Mandarin version of "Do You Ever Shine?". The song was performed with the band members solo performances with their instruments. The collaboration of Mayday and Jam Hsiao, "Song of Ordinary People", "(Leaving the Earth's Surface (Jump!)", “Anywhere Door" and "People Life, Ocean Wild" were performed next. After Mayday down the stage, the fans shouts Jia Ban, which means overtime work in Mandarin, instead of shouts Enocre.

Mayday appeared on stage again and performed the encore part. The encore songs they played, such as "Don’ts Don’ts (Sad People Shouldn't Listen Slow Songs)" and "Stubborn", were different in every shows. Usually the band encore twice. As the concert conclude, a video with samples of "Best Day of My Life" were played to say Good-bye to the fans.

== Commercial performance ==
This tour has visited 55 cities and comprising 122 shows in total. It has become the biggest scaled and the most attendees tour that the band ever had, nearly 90 shows were held in the massive outdoor stadiums, and attracted more than 4.15 million people. All tickets were nearly sold-out, resulting extra shows in few cities were added. Including Hong Kong, Singapore, Shanghai and Beijing, the band visited two times in this tour. The tour grossed around US$250–275 million.

=== Boxscore ===
Date	City	Region	Venue	Attendance	Revenue
September 21, 2018	Sydney	Australia	Qudos Bank Arena	10,408 / 11,724	$2,739,840

== Filming ==
=== Mayday Life 3D ===
On August 26, 2018, after the show in Beijing, the band held a press conference to announce the tour will be filmed and is set to be released in theaters as a movie in 2019. At the same day's show was the last day of filming, they decided to hold the press conference on this day. The band hope to express the real feelings to the audiences, so the movie will be released in 3D.

== Set list ==
This set list is representative of the show on March 18, 2017, in Kaohsiung, Taiwan. It does not represent all concerts for the duration of the tour.

1. "Party Animals"
2. "Best Day of My Life"
3. "OAOA (Right Now is Eternity)"
4. "Loneliness Terminator"
5. "Enter Battle"
6. "2012"
7. "I Won't Let You Be Lonely"
8. "Superman"
9. "You're Not Truly Happy"
10. "Here, After Us"
11. "Song About You"
12. "Cheers"
13. "Brotherhood"
14. "Life. Co Ltd."
15. "Almost Famous"
16. "The Yet Unbroken Part of My Heart"
17. "Sun Wukong"
18. "Contentment"
19. "Life of Planet"
20. "The Dark Knight"
21. "Tough"
22. "Do You Ever Shine? (Mandarin version)"
23. "Leaving the Earth's Surface (Jump!)"
24. "What If We Had Never Met"
25. "Anywhere Door"
26. "Final Chapter"
27. "People Life, Ocean Wild"

Encore

28. "Do Mi So"
29. "Don'ts Don'ts (Sad People Shouldn't Listen Slow Song)"
30. "Crazy World"
31. "Stubborn"
32. "Motor Rock"
33. "This is Love"
34. "Fool"

This set list is representative of the show on June 23, 2018, in Shijiazhuang, China. It does not represent all concerts for the duration of the tour.

1. "Party Animals"
2. "Don'ts Don'ts (Sad People Shouldn't Listen Slow Song)"
3. "OAOA (Right Now is Eternity)"
4. "Enter Battle Song"
5. "Here, After Us"
6. "Superman"
7. "You're Not Truly Happy"
8. "Tenderness"
9. "Cheers"
10. "Brotherhood"
11. "Life. Co. Ltd."
12. "Almost Famous"
13. "The Yet Unbroken Part of My Heart"
14. "Contentment"
15. "Life of Planet"
16. "The Dark Knight"
17. "Tough"
18. "I Will Carry You (A Sole Faith)"
19. "Song of Ordinary People (Jonathan Lee cover)"
20. "Leaving the Earth's Surface (Jump!)"
21. "OK La!"
22. "Anywhere Door"
23. "People Life, Ocean Wild"

Encore

24. "Beginning of the End"
25. "I Won't Let You Be Lonely"
26. "Final Chapter"
27. "Love ing"
28. "Onion (Aska Yang cover)"
29. "Suddenly I Miss You"
30. "Stubborn"
Special guests
- March 20, 2017 – Kaohsiung: "Song of Ordinary People" with Jam Hsiao
- April 29, 2017 – Dalian: "Peter&Mary" and "Suddenly Missing You So Bad" with Shawn Yue and Miriam Yeung
- May 13, 2017 – Hong Kong: "Peter&Mary" and "Suddenly Missing You So Bad" with Shawn Yue and Miriam Yeung
- May 16, 2017 – Hong Kong: "Tuo Tai Huan Gu"and "Love Trap" with Alan Tam
- May 22, 2017 – Hong Kong: "Dont's Dont's" and "Fold Up" with Richie Jen and Edmond Leung
- August 19, 2017 – Beijing: "Song of Ordinary People" and "Hills"with Jonathan Lee
- December 5, 2017 – Shanghai: "Eternal Summer"/"Hip Hop Man" with MC Jin
- January 1, 2018 – Taoyuan: "The Dark Knight" and "Shines Through The Night" with JJ Lin
- January 5, 2018 – Taoyuan: "Dont’s Dont’s" and "Eternal Summer" with Sandy Lam
- January 7, 2018 – Taoyuan: "You Are Not Truly Happy"/"Rhythm of the Rain" and "Nunchucks" with Jay Chou
- March 2, 2018 – Paris: "Song of Ordinary People" and "Hills" with Jonathan Lee
- March 4, 2018 – London: "Song of Ordinary People" and "Hills" with Jonathan Lee
- April 14, 2018 – Changsha: "Here, After, Us" and "Later"(without Ashin) with Rene Liu
- April 29, 2018 – Tianjin: "Step Aside" and "Here, After, Us" with Rene Liu
- May 11, 2018 – Hong Kong: During the show, Hong Kong actor Tony Leung appeared on stage
- May 20, 2018 – Tokyo: "Dancin' Dancin'" with Glay
- June 2, 2018 – Singapore: "Song of Ordinary People" and "Hills" with Jonathan Lee
- July 25, 2018 – Shanghai: "Song of Ordinary People" and "Teng Ai" with Jam Hsiao
- July 27, 2018 – Shanghai: "Jump!", "Peter&Mary" and "Li Bai"(without Ashin) with "Li Ronghao"
- July 28, 2018 – Shanghai: "Dont's Dont's"/"Dancin' Dancin'" and "I'm In Love" with Teru of Glay
- July 29, 2018 – Shanghai: "Suddenly Missing You So Bad", "Eloping To The Moon" and "Groupies"(without Ashin) with Cheer Chen
- August 24, 2018 — Beijing: "Jump!"/"Three Days and Three Nights" and "Here, After, Us" with A-mei
- August 25, 2018 — Beijing: "You Are Not Truly Happy"/"Tian Kong" and "The Great Artist" with Jolin Tsai
- August 26, 2018 — Beijing: "Don'ts Don'ts" and "Every Star" with Huang Bo
- October 6, 2018 — Bangkok: "Don'ts Don'ts" with Slot Machine
- December 22, 2018 – Taichung: "A Little Happiness"(without Ashin) and "This is Love" with Hebe Tien
- December 24, 2018 – Taichung: "Jump!", "Breaking Beart"/"I Will Miss You"/"Wonder If You Will Miss Me in That Night"/"Nunchucks" and "Stupid Child" with Jacky Wu
- December 29, 2018 — Taichung: "Live&Life" with Mickey Huang
- December 30, 2018 — Taichung: "Sun Wu Kong" and "Your Call" with Sambora of TOLAKU
- January 1, 2019 — Taichung: "Norwegian Forest" and "Viva Love" with Wu Bai
- January 4, 2019 — Taichung: "Party Boy"/"Don'ts Don'ts" and "Peter&Mary" with Show Lo

== Tour dates ==
List of concerts, showing date, city, country, venue and opening acts
Dates	City	Region	Venue	Opening acts
March 18, 2017	Kaohsiung	Taiwan	National Stadium	Jia Jia
March 19, 2017	Kaohsiung	Taiwan	National Stadium	#GBOYSWAG
March 20, 2017	Kaohsiung	Taiwan	National Stadium	#GBOYSWAG
March 21, 2017	Kaohsiung	Taiwan	National Stadium	Jia Jia
March 25, 2017	Guangzhou	China	Guangzhou University Town Stadium	Jia Jia
March 26, 2017	Guangzhou	China	Guangzhou University Town Stadium	#GBOYSWAG
April 2, 2017	Xiamen	China	Xiamen Stadium	#GBOYSWAG
April 8, 2017	Hangzhou	China	Yellow Dragon Sports Center Stadium	#GBOYSWAG
April 9, 2017	Hangzhou	China	Yellow Dragon Sports Center Stadium	#GBOYSWAG
April 15, 2017	Hefei	China	Hefei Olympic Sports Center Stadium	Jia Jia
April 22, 2017	Zhengzhou	China	Zhengzhou Sports Center Stadium	#GBOYSWAG
April 29, 2017	Dalian	China	Dalian Sports Center Stadium	#GBOYSWAG
May 1, 2017	Jinan	China	Jinan Olympic Sports Center Stadium	#GBOYSWAG
May 6, 2017	Taiyuan	China	Sanxi Sports Center Stadium	Jia Jia
May 10, 2017	Hong Kong		Hong Kong Coliseum	#GBOYSWAG
May 11, 2017	Hong Kong		Hong Kong Coliseum	#GBOYSWAG
May 13, 2017	Hong Kong		Hong Kong Coliseum	#GBOYSWAG
May 14, 2017	Hong Kong		Hong Kong Coliseum	—N/a
May 16, 2017	Hong Kong		Hong Kong Coliseum	—N/a
May 17, 2017	Hong Kong		Hong Kong Coliseum	—N/a
May 19, 2017	Hong Kong		Hong Kong Coliseum	Jia Jia
May 20, 2017	Hong Kong		Hong Kong Coliseum	Jia Jia
May 22, 2017	Hong Kong		Hong Kong Coliseum	Jia Jia
May 23, 2017	Hong Kong		Hong Kong Coliseum	—N/a
May 27, 2017	Harbin	China	HICEC Stadium	#GBOYSWAG
July 7, 2017	Hohhot	China	Hohhot City Stadium	Jia Jia
July 15, 2017	Guiyang	China	Guiyang Olympic Sports Center Stadium	Jia Jia
July 22, 2017	Xi'an	China	Shaanxi Province Stadium	#GBOYSWAG
July 29, 2017	Nanning	China	Guangxi Sports Center Stadium	Jia Jia
August 5, 2017	Qingdao	China	Qingdao Sports Center Stadium	#GBOYSWAG
August 18, 2017	Beijing	China	Beijing National Stadium	Jia Jia
August 19, 2017	Beijing	China	Beijing National Stadium	Li Jian Qing
September 10, 2017	Shenzhen	China	Shenzhen Universiade Sports Centre	#GBOYSWAG
September 11, 2017	Shenzhen	China	Shenzhen Universiade Sports Centre	The Last Day of Summer
September 16, 2017	Luoyang	China	Luoyang Stadium	Jia Jia
October 6, 2017	Nanjing	China	Nanjing Olympic Sports Centre	#GBOYSWAG
October 7, 2017	Nanjing	China	Nanjing Olympic Sports Centre	Jia Jia
October 14, 2017	Fuzhou	China	Fuzhou Strait Olympic Sports Center Stadium	#GBOYSWAG
October 28, 2017	Kuala Lumpur	Malaysia	Stadium Merdeka	#GBOYSWAG
November 8, 2017	Vancouver	Canada	Rogers Arena	Jia Jia
November 10, 2017	San Jose	United States	SAP Center	Jia Jia
November 11, 2017	Anaheim	United States	Honda Center	Jia Jia
November 15, 2017	Houston	United States	Smart Financial Centre	—N/a
November 18, 2017	Brooklyn	United States	Barclays Center	Jia Jia
November 21, 2017	Chicago	United States	Auditorium Theatre	—N/a
November 26, 2017	Toronto	Canada	Air Canada Centre	—N/a
December 2, 2017	Shanghai	China	Hongkou Football Stadium	Li Jian Qing
December 3, 2017	Shanghai	China	Hongkou Football Stadium	Li Jian Qing
December 5, 2017	Shanghai	China	Hongkou Football Stadium	#GBOYSWAG
December 6, 2017	Shanghai	China	Hongkou Football Stadium	#GBOYSWAG
December 8, 2017	Shanghai	China	Hongkou Football Stadium	Cosmos People
December 15, 2017	Singapore		Singapore Indoor Stadium	#GBOYSWAG
December 16, 2017	Singapore		Singapore Indoor Stadium	#GBOYSWAG
December 17, 2017	Singapore		Singapore Indoor Stadium	—N/a
December 23, 2017	Taoyuan	Taiwan	Taoyuan International Baseball Stadium	HUSH
December 24, 2017	Taoyuan	Taiwan	Taoyuan International Baseball Stadium	#GBOYSWAG
December 26, 2017	Taoyuan	Taiwan	Taoyuan International Baseball Stadium	Jia Jia
December 27, 2017	Taoyuan	Taiwan	Taoyuan International Baseball Stadium	Cosmos People
December 29, 2017	Taoyuan	Taiwan	Taoyuan International Baseball Stadium	Cosmos People
December 30, 2017	Taoyuan	Taiwan	Taoyuan International Baseball Stadium	Jia Jia
December 31, 2017	Taoyuan	Taiwan	Taoyuan International Baseball Stadium	Wonfu
January 1, 2018	Taoyuan	Taiwan	Taoyuan International Baseball Stadium	#GBOYSWAG
January 5, 2018	Taoyuan	Taiwan	Taoyuan International Baseball Stadium	Jia Jia
January 6, 2018	Taoyuan	Taiwan	Taoyuan International Baseball Stadium	Cosmos People
January 7, 2018	Taoyuan	Taiwan	Taoyuan International Baseball Stadium	#GBOYSWAG
January 26, 2018	Macau		Cotai Arena	—N/a
January 27, 2018	Macau		Cotai Arena	—N/a
January 28, 2018	Macau		Cotai Arena	—N/a
February 1, 2018	Macau		Cotai Arena	—N/a
March 2, 2018	Paris	France	AccorHotels Arena	—N/a
March 4, 2018	London	England	The O_{2} Arena	—N/a
March 24, 2018	Quanzhou	China	Quanzhou Sports Center Stadium	Jia Jia
April 6, 2018	Suzhou	China	Suzhou Sports Center Stadium	Cosmos People
April 7, 2018	Suzhou	China	Suzhou Sports Center Stadium	#GBOYSWAG
April 14, 2018	Changsha	China	Helong Sports Center Stadium	Li Jian Qing
April 15, 2018	Changsha	China	Helong Sports Center Stadium	#GBOYSWAG
April 21, 2018	Jinhua	China	Jinhua Stadium	Cosmos People
April 29, 2018	Tianjin	China	Tianjin Olympic Center Stadium	Li Jian Qing
April 30, 2018	Tianjin	China	Tianjin Olympic Center Stadium	Jia Jia
May 4, 2018	Hong Kong		Fantasy Road Outdoor Venue; Hong Kong Disneyland	—N/a
May 5, 2018	Hong Kong		Fantasy Road Outdoor Venue; Hong Kong Disneyland	—N/a
May 6, 2018	Hong Kong		Fantasy Road Outdoor Venue; Hong Kong Disneyland	—N/a
May 11, 2018	Hong Kong		Fantasy Road Outdoor Venue; Hong Kong Disneyland	—N/a
May 12, 2018	Hong Kong		Fantasy Road Outdoor Venue; Hong Kong Disneyland	—N/a
May 13, 2018	Hong Kong		Fantasy Road Outdoor Venue; Hong Kong Disneyland	—N/a
May 19, 2018	Tokyo	Japan	Nippon Budokan	—N/a
May 20, 2018	Tokyo	Japan	Nippon Budokan	—N/a
May 26, 2018 (Note: The show in Shenyang was originally scheduled to take place on August 26, 2017, but was rescheduled to May 26, 2018, for unknown reason.)	Shenyang	China	Shenyang Olympic Sports Center Stadium	Xiao Bing Chih
June 2, 2018	Singapore		Singapore National Stadium	Xiao Bing Chih
June 23, 2018	Shijiazhuang	China	Hebei Olympic Sports Center Stadium	Xiao Bing Chih
June 30, 2018	Foshan	China	Century Lotus Stadium	Cosmos People
July 1, 2018	Foshan	China	Century Lotus Stadium	Xiao Bing Chih
July 7, 2018	Kunming	China	Kunming Tuodong Stadium	Li Jian Qing
July 8, 2018	Kunming	China	Kunming Tuodong Stadium	Ann
July 13, 2018	Changzhou	China	Changzhou Olympic Sports Centre Stadium	Xiao Bing Chih
July 14, 2018	Changzhou	China	Changzhou Olympic Sports Centre Stadium	HUSH
July 20, 2018	Chengdu	China	Shuangliu Sports Centre Stadium	Xiao Bing Chih
July 21, 2018	Chengdu	China	Shuangliu Sports Centre Stadium	Li Jian Qing
July 25, 2018	Shanghai	China	Jinshan Sports Centre Stadium	Cosmos People
July 27, 2018	Shanghai	China	Jinshan Sports Centre Stadium	Ann
July 28, 2018	Shanghai	China	Jinshan Sports Centre Stadium	Ezu
July 29, 2018	Shanghai	China	Jinshan Sports Centre Stadium	Xiao Bing Chih
August 11, 2018	Xiangyang	China	Xiangyang Sports Center Stadium	Cosmos People
August 18, 2018	Nanchang	China	Nanchang Olympic Sports Centre Stadium	HUSH
August 24, 2018	Beijing	China	Beijing National Stadium	Xiao Bing Chih
August 25, 2018	Beijing	China	Beijing National Stadium	Ezu; Li Jian Qing
August 26, 2018	Beijing	China	Beijing National Stadium	Cosmos People
September 8, 2018	Seoul	South Korea	Olympic Hall	#GBOYSWAG
September 18, 2018	Melbourne	Australia	Melbourne Arena	—N/a
September 21, 2018	Sydney	Australia	Qudos Bank Arena	—N/a
September 23, 2018	Auckland	New Zealand	The Trusts Arena	—N/a
October 6, 2018	Bangkok	Thailand	Impact Exhibition Hall 1	Xiao Bing Chih
December 22, 2018	Taichung	Taiwan	Taichung Intercontinental Baseball Stadium	Ann
December 23, 2018	Taichung	Taiwan	Taichung Intercontinental Baseball Stadium	Ezu
December 24, 2018	Taichung	Taiwan	Taichung Intercontinental Baseball Stadium	Jia Jia
December 29, 2018	Taichung	Taiwan	Taichung Intercontinental Baseball Stadium	Mickey Huang
December 30, 2018	Taichung	Taiwan	Taichung Intercontinental Baseball Stadium	Xiao Bing Chih
December 31, 2018	Taichung	Taiwan	Taichung Intercontinental Baseball Stadium	Ann
January 1, 2019	Taichung	Taiwan	Taichung Intercontinental Baseball Stadium	Jia Jia
January 4, 2019	Taichung	Taiwan	Taichung Intercontinental Baseball Stadium	Ann
January 5, 2019	Taichung	Taiwan	Taichung Intercontinental Baseball Stadium	Ezu
January 6, 2019	Taichung	Taiwan	Taichung Intercontinental Baseball Stadium	Xiao Bing Chih

=== Cancelled shows ===
Date	City	Country	Venue	Reason
May 29, 2017	Chongqing	China	Chongqing Olympic Sports Center	Venue Grass Damaged
