= Ding Dang (singer) =

Chinese singer

Della Ding
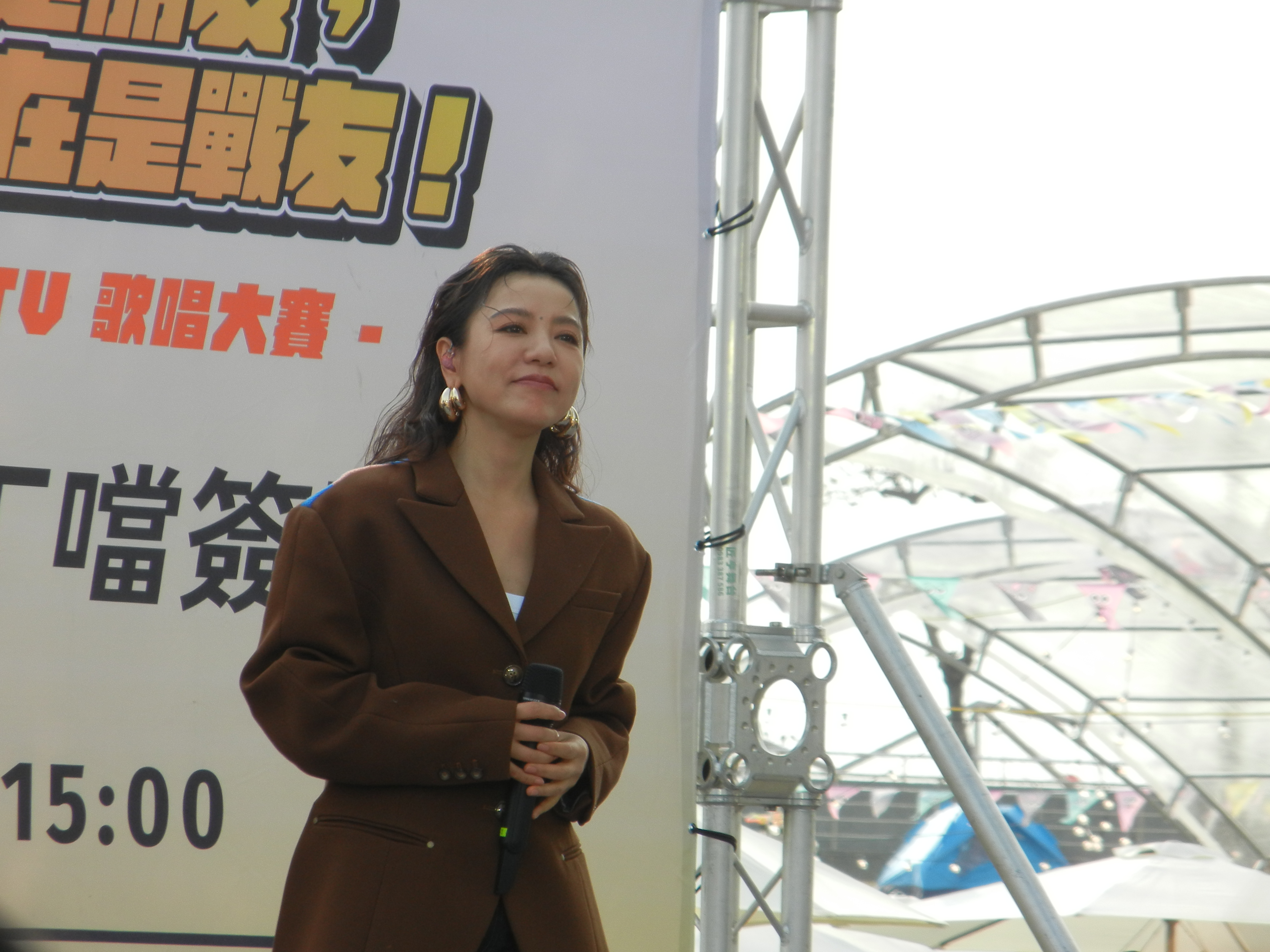
- Ding Dang in February 2026
- Born: Wu Xian; April 17, 1982 (age 44); Jiaxing, Zhejiang, China
- Education: Hangzhou Normal University
- Occupation: Singer
- Years active: 2006–present
- Notable work: "I Love Him" "Why Did You Lie" "I'm A Little Bird" "Onions"
- Musical career
- Genres: Mandopop
- Instrument: Vocals
- Label: B'in Music

Chinese name
- Simplified Chinese: 丁当
- Traditional Chinese: 丁噹
- Hanyu Pinyin: Dīng Dāng

Birth name
- Simplified Chinese: 吴娴
- Traditional Chinese: 吳嫻
- Hanyu Pinyin: Wú Xián
- Website: B'in Music

Ding Dang (simplified Chinese: 丁当; traditional Chinese: 丁噹; born Wu Xian on April 17, 1982), also known as Della, is a Taiwan-based Chinese singer who is known for her wide vocal range and emotive soundtracks for numerous television series.

== Early life and education ==
Ding Dang was born on April 17, 1982 in Zhejiang. When she was growing up, her parents divorced. She graduated from the Fourth High School in Jiashan County in 1998.

== Career ==
=== 1999–2005: Early career – bar singing and Rock Records ===
In 1999, Ding Dang decided pursue her childhood interest in music, and left for neighbouring cities despite concerns from her parents. She first adopted the stage name, Ding Dang (叮当) taking after her favourite cartoon character Doraemon, (Note: Doraemon is commonly translated to Ding Dang (叮当) or Xiao Ding Dang (小叮当) in Chinese before official translation rights were given. Even after the robot's name was officially translated to a name that matches its Japanese name, the bootleg translation remained popular.) the blue robot in the eponymous manga, however the first character of the stage name was changed to a similarly sounding Ding (丁) after taking advice from a fortune teller. She performed in various cabarets in Huzhou, Ningbo, and subsequent was employed in a bar in Hangzhou's World Trade Center as a singer. In March 2003, Della was signed to the Rock Records after executives from the record company heard her sing at the bar. However, due various reasons she did not debut under Rock Records. Initially, she was delayed by a SARS infection during 2002–2004 SARS outbreak in 2003. Then Rock Records had an exodus of employees who were responsible for producing albums, as well as some financial constraints that limited their abilities to take care of every singer under them. Additionally, the Chinese market was getting crowded with new singers minted from popular singing competitions, and thus new singers from record companies had little opportunities to gain a foothold in the market. Ding Dang was unable to participate in the singing competitions due to contractual obligations. With only 1,000 RMB monthly allowance, Ding Dang decided to return to singing at the bar after a discussion with Rock Records.

=== 2006–2007: Debut ===
In 2006, some of the higher management personnel in Rock Records established B'in Music to manage the development of singers and produce music, while Rock Records would continue to distribute the produced music. This arrangement was made under the advent of online music streaming and the shrinking lucrative CD sales that affected markets globally. Many of the established singers signed by Rock Records such as Mayday (五月天), Fish Leong (梁静茹), Victor Wong (品冠) would also move to B'in Music as their contracts with Rock Records were due for renewal about the same time.

During this transition in the management of singers between Rock Records and B'in Music, Ding Dang had an hour long conversation with B'in Music's Xie Zhifen (謝芝芬) who was formerly a higher management at Rock Records. The conversation, along with an 8 seconds long audition lead B'in Music to sign Ding Dang on as a singer as well. As B'in Music is a Taiwanese company with its production crew primarily based in Taiwan, being the only Mainland Chinese under them at that time, Ding Dang left for Taiwan to continue her singing career.

However, before she could release her first album, she would be tasked be the opening act in various Mayday's local concerts in Taiwan. Facing the audience as an unrecognised singer with no songs to call her own, she was met with varying responses from the audience, from polite applause to outright booing. In July 2007, Ding Dang released her first two singles, Run Away from Home (離家出走) and Can or Not (可以不可以). Thereafter, she performed the songs in as part of an opening act for Mayday's concert on to which the originally unwelcoming audience responded enthusiastically. With Run Away from Home, she won Top New Artists award at 2007 KKBOX Music Awards.

=== 2008–present ===
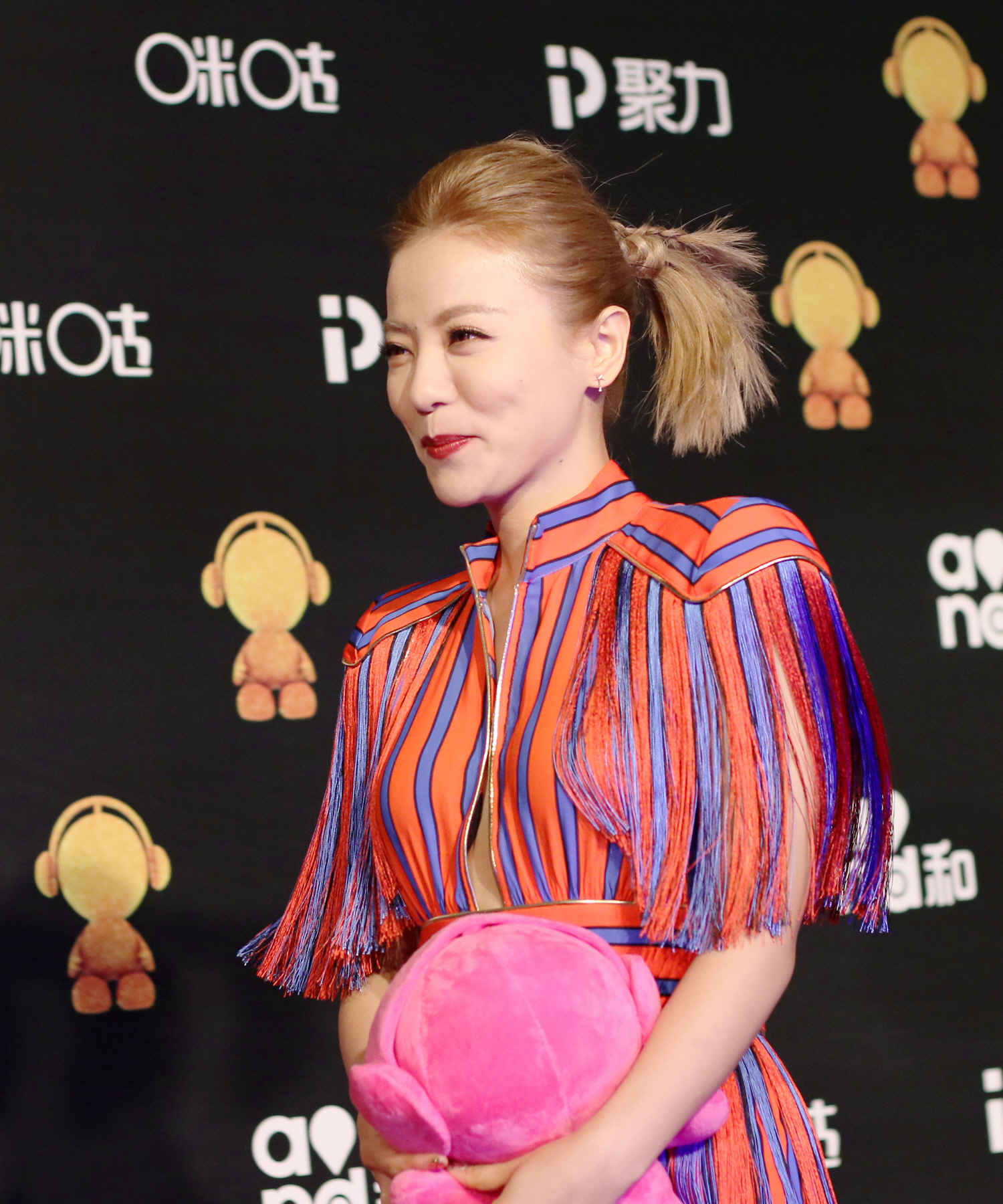
Ding Dang in 2016

In 2008, Ding Dang released her second album Decisively Loved (我爱上的) in Taiwan first on 8 July 2008, before promoting the album in mainland China on November 27, 2008. By then, one of the songs, Can't Guess, (猜不透) became one of the most downloaded ringtones, requested songs, and most sang to in karaoke establishments in Taiwan. On 23 September 2009, she released her third album, Night Cat (夜猫). Two of the songs, I Love Him (我爱他) and Suddenly Want To Love You (突然想爱你) were used as the opening and ending theme songs for the popular 2009 romance drama, Autumn's Concerto. I Love Him became popular as well, with it being the most popular song to be played in karaoke establishments in Taiwan between 2009 and 2010. The song would remain as popular in subsequent years.

In 2015, Della entered The Chinese version of King of Mask Singer (蒙面歌王), using the mask of Black Swan to conceal her identity. She was crowned the Mask King of the second episode. She also participated in Sisters Who Make Waves (乘风破浪的姐姐) in 2020.

== Discography ==
=== Studio albums ===
- (2007) Run Away From Home
- (2008) Decisively Loved
- (2009) Night Cat
- (2010) Fu Good (New + Best Selection)
- (2011) Soulmate
- (2012) Dall-One in a Thousand
- (2014) Dare to Love
- (2016) Be My Own Friend
- (2019) Die Lovin'
- (2021) Sing Together Again

=== Collaborations ===
- (2017) "Force it, Okay?" (强求好嗎?) with Alan Tam
