= Cosmos People =

Taiwanese band

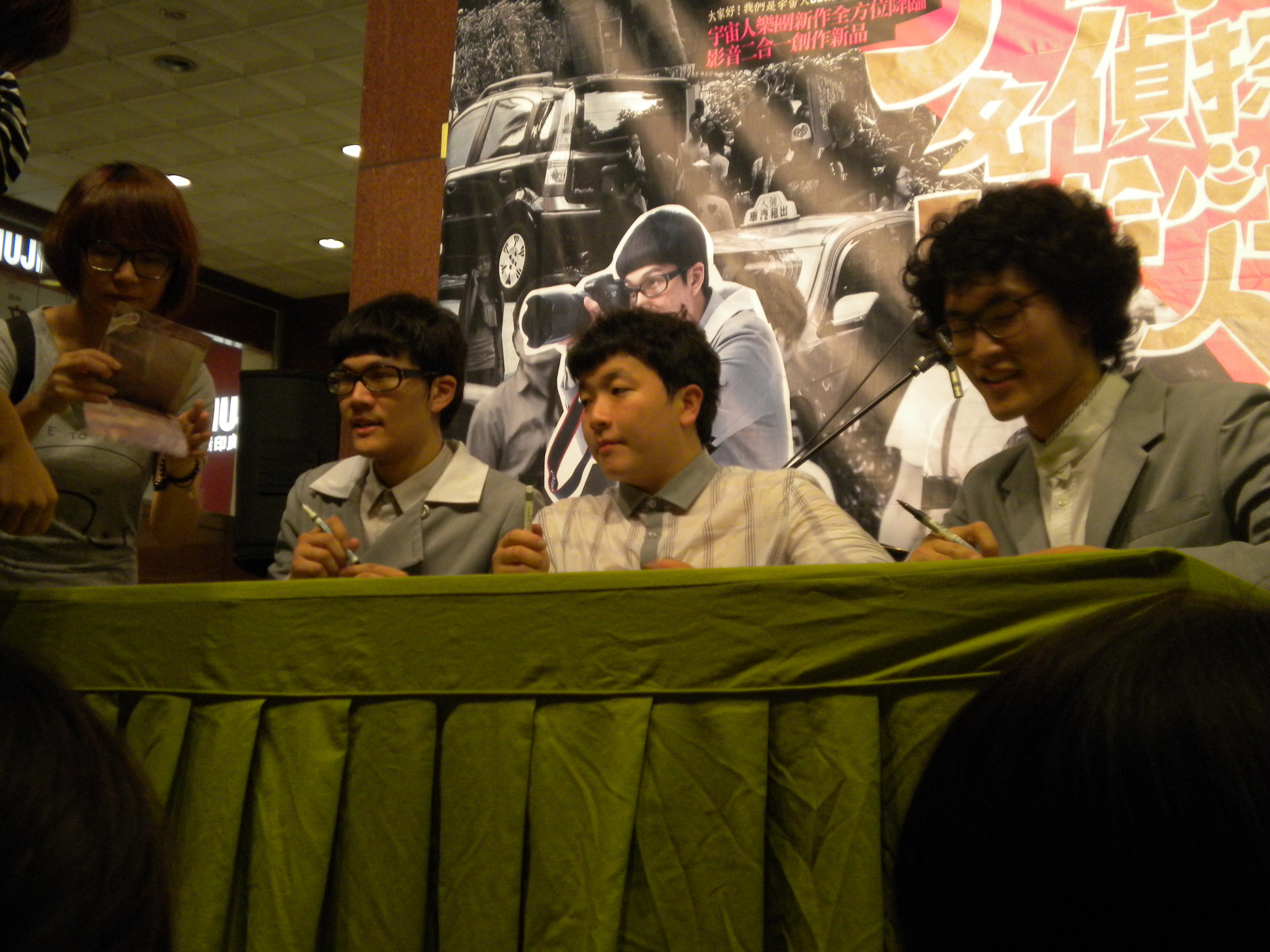
- Cosmos People in 2010

Background information
- Origin: Taiwan
- Genres: Indie pop; indie rock; Mandopop
- Years active: 2004–present
- Label: B'in Music
- Members: Jade; A-Kui; FunQ

Chinese name
- Traditional Chinese: 宇宙人
Transcriptions
Standard Mandarin
- Hanyu Pinyin: Yǔ zhòu rén

Cosmos People (Chinese: 宇宙人; stylized as COSMOS PEOPLE) is a Taiwanese band formed in 2004. Their music is known for its use of funk and dance-pop elements.

== Career ==
=== 2004-2010: Early years and band formation ===
The members are all graduates of Taipei Municipal Jianguo High School. After high school graduation in 2004, they decided that they needed a band name. They wanted a catchy name. Inspiration came from baseball player Ichiro Suzuki, who was described by the media as "from a different planet" due to his exceptional skills. When they heard this, they wished that they wanted to have that same ambition. They discussed on MSN Messenger for a while before settling on "Cosmos People", which represents encouragement for themselves to become unlike any other band on Earth.

=== 2010-2012: Return from military service and Earthwalk ===
In 2011, mandatory service ended for all the band members, and FunQ also returned from music school in America. They released the song "War Song", using Nirvana's "Smells Like Teen Spirit" as inspiration for the arrangement.

In October 2012 they released their second album Earthwalk, which was praised by fans and critics for its down-to-earth concept.

In February 2013, Cosmos People and other artists from B'in Music performed together at Taipei Arena for "B'in Together". They also toured in Taiwan, Hong Kong, Shanghai, and Singapore. They were also invited to perform at SXSW in Austin, TX.

In August 2014 they released their first Japanese album コスモロジー in Japan, and they attended Summer Sonic Festival. In October, for their 10th anniversary, they climbed Mount Everest together and filmed a documentary.

=== 2015-2016: 10000 hours, new Japanese single ===
In May 2015 they released their third album 10000 hours, which was named after the 10,000-Hour Rule. The album's style is different than their previous albums. In February 2016 they released a Japanese EP TIME LAPSE in Japan, which included a new Japanese single.

=== 2017-2018: Continued music career, venture into film ===
In 2017 Jade starred in 52Hz, I Love You, directed by Wei Te-sheng. FunQ and A-Kui voiced Superman and the Joker, respectively, for the Taiwanese dub of The Lego Batman Movie. In October they released their fourth album RIGHT NOW, and held two concerts at Legacy Taipei.

In 2018 they performed their world tour "Our Adventure Concert" (OADV).

=== 2019: Where Have All The Flowers Gone Art exhibition, "Ten More Years" Tour ===
In April 2019 artist Ji Yun collaborated with ten musical groups and ten artists to produce the art exhibition Where Have All The Flowers Gone. Cosmos People wrote "Don't Touch" to be included in the album Where Have All the Flowers Gone.

In May 2019 they wrote the promotional song "Play One" for Buddy, the mascot of ican entertainment.

In July 2019 they started their "Ten More Years" tour. They announced their plans to perform at Taipei Arena at their concert on 19 July.

== Members ==
=== Current members ===
- Lin Chung-Yu (Jade; 小玉) (January 2, 1986 (age 40)) – lead vocals, keyboard
- Chen Kuei-Yen (A-Kui; 阿奎) (April 10, 1986 (age 40)) – guitar
- Fang Kuei-Tang (FunQ; 方Q) (December 17, 1983 (age 42)) – bass

=== Past members ===
- Li Tung-Yo (September 5, 1985 (age 40)) – drums, now the drummer for 88 balaz.
- Chen Wei-Da (A-Da; A達) (December 13, 1985 (age 40)) – bass
- Wei Hung-Bo (WeiPun; 魏胖) (August 4, 1987 (age 38)) – drums

== Discography ==
=== Albums ===
- Cosmos People (宇宙人同名專輯; 2009)
- Earthwalk (地球漫步; 2012)
- Cosmology (コスモロジー; 2014)
- 10000 hours (一萬小時; 2015)
- RIGHT NOW (右腦; 2017)
- (理想狀態; 2022)

=== EP ===
- 001.5 Lost Detective (001.5名偵探敗給心上人; 2010)
- TIME LAPSE (2016)

=== Singles ===
- "Not Easy" ("不簡單") (April 2016)
- "O LA O" ("拿下這一場") (16 March 2018)
- "Taste of Home" ("一桌菜") (January 2019)
- "Kimi wa itsudemo" ("君はいつでも") (August 2023, digital, lyrics written by Shikao Suga)

=== Compilation ===
- Where Have All the Flowers Gone (查無此人 音樂概念專輯; 2019) – "Don't Touch" ("禁止觸摸")

== Awards ==
- 27th Golden Melody Awards - nominated for Best Band - 10000 hours (一萬小時)
