= Accusefive =

Taiwanese indie band

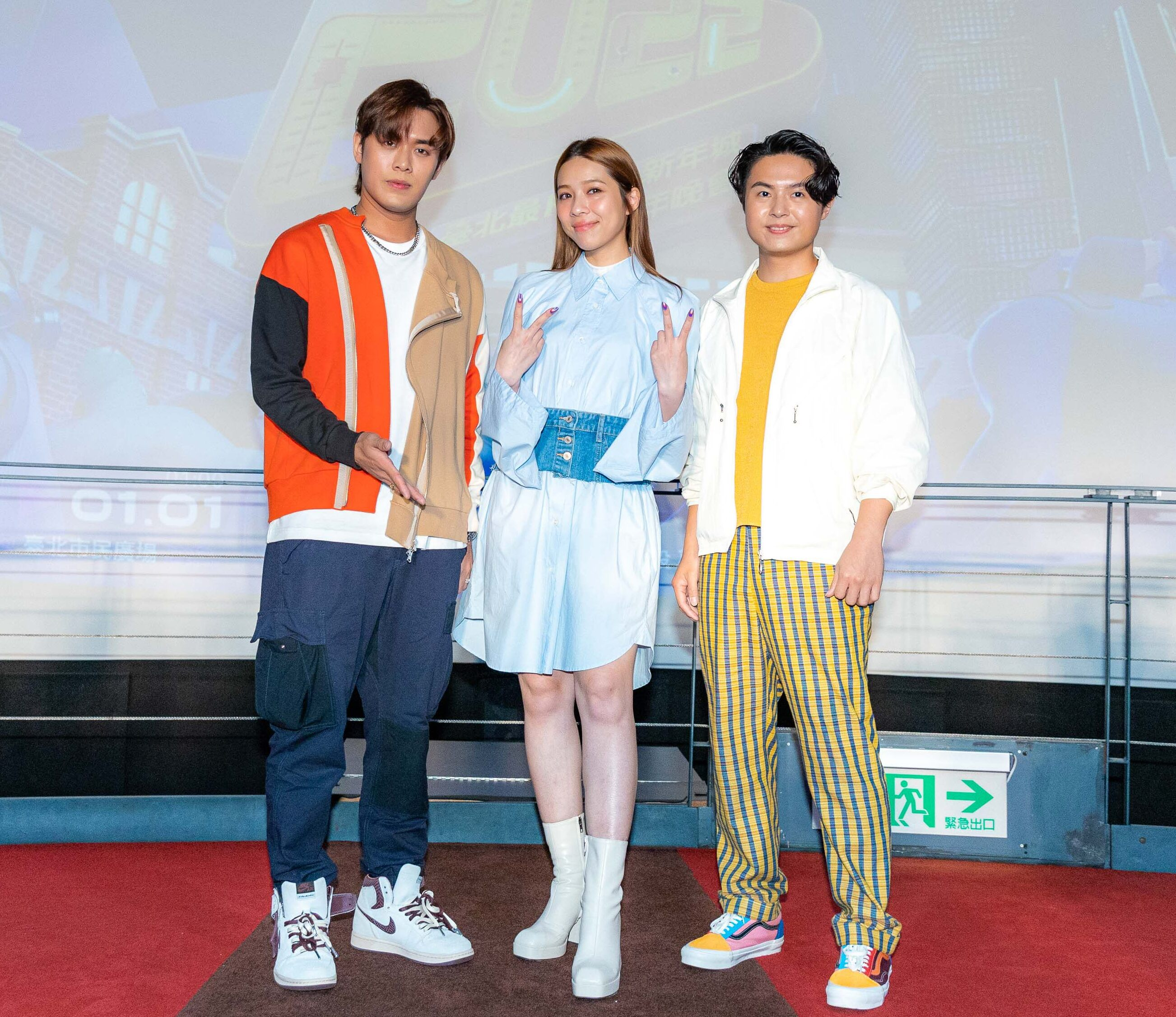
- Accusefive in 2022; L–R: Pan Yun-an, Chuan Ching, Richard Lin

Background information
- Origin: Yilan County, Taiwan
- Genres: Indie rock; folk rock; alternative rock; Mandopop
- Years active: 2017–present
- Label: B'in Music
- Members: Richard Lin; Chuan Ching; Pan Yun-an
- Website: Accusefive on Facebook

Chinese name
- Traditional Chinese: 告五人
Transcriptions
Standard Mandarin
- Hanyu Pinyin: Gàowǔrén
Southern Min
- Hokkien POJ: Kò-gō̍-lâng

Accusefive (Chinese: 告五人; pinyin: Gàowǔrén; Pe̍h-ōe-jī: Kò-gō̍-lâng) is a Taiwanese rock band founded in 2017 in Yilan County, composed of lead vocalist and guitarist Pan Yun-an, singer Tsai Hsin-lun (Chuan Ching/Quan Qing), and drummer Richard Lin.

== Musical career ==
=== 2017–2019: Career beginnings ===
Accusefive was founded in April 2017 by Pan, Tsai, and Lin, in Yilan County, Taiwan. Tsai and Pan both attended National Yilan Senior High School and are in a relationship. The band's name doesn't have a special meaning. Rather, the three characters of the Chinese name ("accuse", "five" and "people") were chosen by each band member randomly pointing to a word on bulletin board.

The band released its first mini-album, Son of Mist, in October 2017. They won Best New Artist at the 9th Golden Indie Music Awards.

=== 2019–2022: Recognition ===
Their 2019 album, Somewhere in Time, I Love You, was nominated for Best New Artist and Best Band at the 31st Golden Melody Awards in 2020. Their 2020 Album, Easy Come, Easy Go, was nominated for Best Band at the 32nd Golden Melody Awards in 2021.

"You Are My Magic" (給你一瓶魔法藥水) was released on June 14, 2022, a music video accompanied its release.

=== 2023–present: Continued success ===
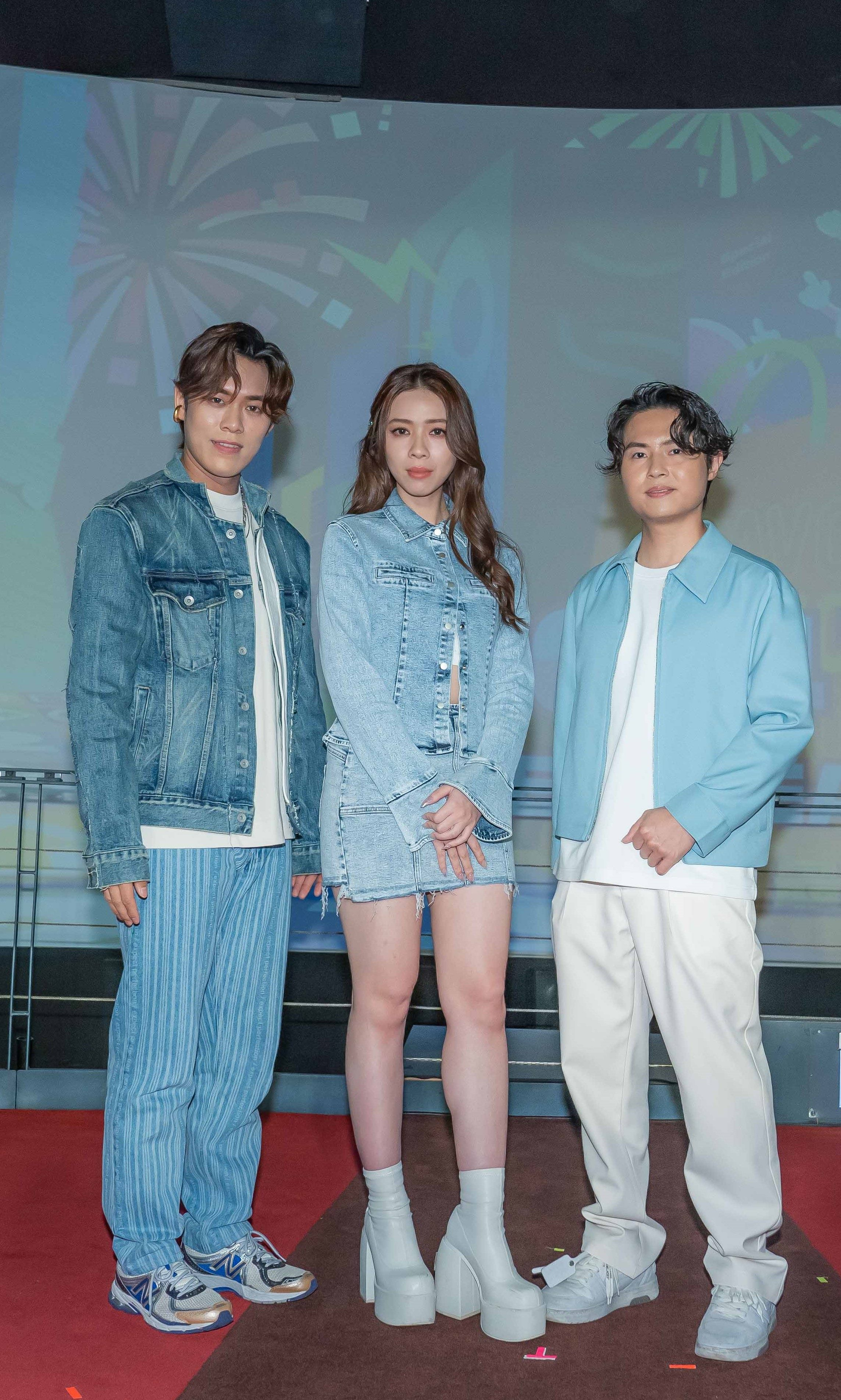
Accusefive in 2023

In November 2023, the band participated in season 5 of Dragon TV's singing variety show Singing with Legends (我们的歌 第五季). In March 2024, Accusefive embarked on their My Magic Tour at the Yilan County Stadium, subsequently performing at stadiums in Shenzhen, Beijing, Shanghai, and Kaohsiung.

== Members ==
- Tsai Hsin-lun / Chuan Ching (犬青) — vocalist
- Pan Yun-an (雲安) — vocalist and guitarist
- Richard Lin (哲謙) — drummer

== Discography ==
=== Studio albums ===
Title	Album details	Peak chart positions
Title	Album details	HK
Somewhere in Time, I Love You (我肯定在幾百年前就說過愛你)	Released: June 14, 2019; Label: B'in Music; Formats: CD, digital download	—
Easy Come, Easy Go (運氣來得若有似無)	Released: December 31, 2020; Label: B'in Music; Formats: CD, digital download	—
We Will Be Fine (帶你飛)	Released: February 14, 2023; Label: B'in Music; Formats: CD, digital download	—
The Dreamers (我們就像那些要命的傻瓜)	Released: July 8, 2025; Label: B'in Music; Formats: CD, digital download	—

=== Extended plays ===
Title	Album details
Mistborn (迷霧之子)	Released: October 3, 2017; Label: B'in Music; Formats: CD, digital download

=== Singles ===
Title	Year	Album
"Summer Love" (愛在夏天)	2018	Non-album singles
"miss you day and night" (披星戴月的想你)	2018	Non-album singles
"Night life.Take us to the light" (帶我去找夜生活)	2019	Non-album singles
"100 Ways" (說我愛你的一百種方式)	2020	Be Better There
"Kacauan" (新世界)	2020	Non-album singles
"Easy Come, Easy Go" (運氣來得若有似無)	2020	Non-album singles
"Love in Summer" (愛在夏天－盛夏之約)	2021	Non-album singles
"Only Forward" (只管向前)	2021	Non-album singles
"Just Like Heaven" (像是在天堂)	2021	Non-album singles
"Monologue" (寂寞留白)	2021	Be Somebody OST
"Live a Little"	2021	Non-album singles
"Finally" (好不容易)	2021	Light the Night OST

== Awards and nominations ==
Year	Award Ceremony	Category	Nominated work	Result
2018	9th Golden Indie Music Awards	Best New Artist	Mistborn（迷霧之子)	Won
2020	31st Golden Melody Awards	Best New Artist	Somewhere in Time I Love You (我肯定在幾百年前就說過愛你）	Nominated
2020	31st Golden Melody Awards	Best Band	Somewhere in Time I Love You (我肯定在幾百年前就說過愛你）	Nominated
2021	32nd Golden Melody Awards	Best Band	Easy Come, Easy Go (運氣來得若有似無）	Nominated
2021	32nd Golden Melody Awards	Best Composition	Pan Yun-an for Where I Lost Us (在這座城市遺失了你)	Nominated
2021	32nd Golden Melody Awards	Best Song	Pan Yun-an for Where I Lost Us (在這座城市遺失了你)	Nominated
2022	17th KKBOX Music Awards	Artist of the Year	Accusefive	Won
2023	18th KKBOX Music Awards	Artist of the Year	Accusefive	Won
2024	35th Golden Melody Awards	Best Band	We Will Be Fine (帶你飛)	Nominated
2024	35th Golden Melody Awards	Best Chinese Album	We Will Be Fine (帶你飛)	Nominated
2024	35th Golden Melody Awards	Best Album	We Will Be Fine (帶你飛)	Nominated
2024	35th Golden Melody Awards	Best Song	Pan Yun-an for We Will Be Fine (又到天黑)	Won
2024	19th KKBOX Music Awards	Artist of the Year	Accusefive	Won
2025	20th KKBOX Music Awards	Artist of the Year	Accusefive	Won
2025	62th Golden Horse Awards	Best Original Film Song	Pan Yun-an for True Colors (我天生-有病版)	Nominated
2026	21th KKBOX Music Awards	Artist of the Year	Accusefive	Won
2026	37th Golden Melody Awards	Best Band	The Dreamers (我們就像那些要命的傻瓜)	Nominated

== Concert tours ==
- Mistborn Tour (2017)
- Meet You in This City (2022–2023)
- Around the New World Tour (2023–2024)
- My Magic Tour (2024–2025)
- Run,Run,Run! Tour (2025-2026)
- @century Tour (2026-)
