= Jia Jia (singer) =

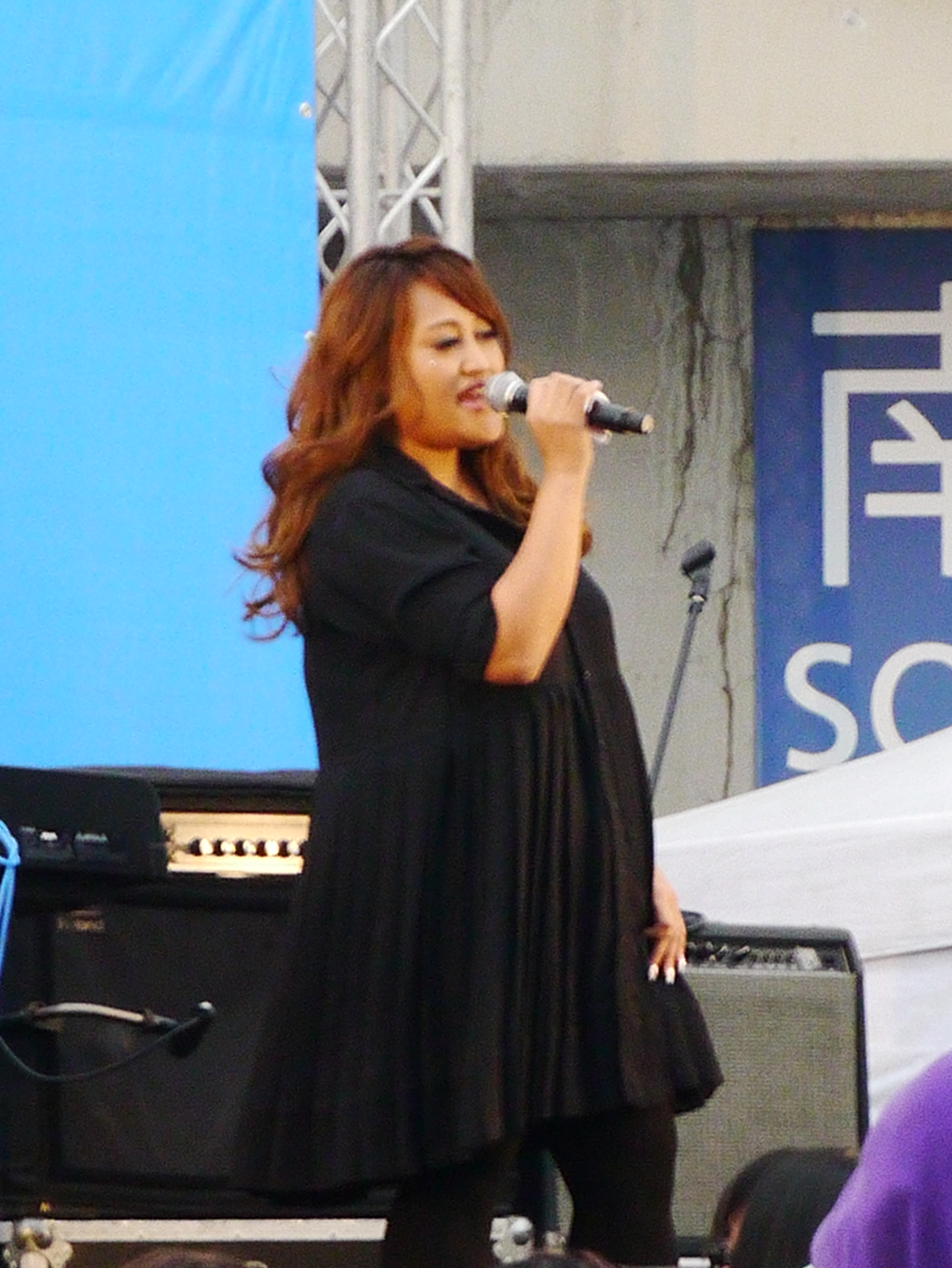
- Jia Jia at Kaohsiung National Stadium on 30 December 2012
- Born: Auli Puruburubuane; 8 January 1983 (age 43); Taitung City, Taitung County, Taiwan
- Education: Taipei College of Maritime Technology
- Occupations: Singer, songwriter, actress
- Years active: 2006–present
- Awards: Golden Melody Awards – 18th Golden Melody Awards – Best Group (as Hao-en and Jiajia)
- Musical career
- Also known as: Ji Jia-ying
- Genres: Mandapop
- Label: B'in Music

Auli Puruburubuane (born on 8 January 1983), known professionally as Jia Jia (Chinese: 家家; pinyin: Jiājiā; Wade–Giles: Chia-chia) or Chi Chia-ying (Chinese: 紀家盈; pinyin: Jì Jiāyíng), is a Taiwanese aboriginal singer and songwriter.

== Personal life ==
She was born in Taitung City to a father of Bunun descent and a mother of Puyuma descent. Her uncle is Purdur, the winner of the Best Mandarin Male Singer of the 11th Golden Melody Awards. Her sister is the singer Samingad.

== Discography ==
=== Studio albums ===
Title	Album details	Track listing
Unforgettable 忘不記	Released: 29 December 2012; Label: B'in Music; Formats: CD, digital download	Track listing: 1. 靈魂化石; 2. 忘不記; 3. 填空; 4. 分開的常理; 5. 花火祭 (feat. Yen-j); 6. 淚滴; 7. 改變; 8. 不一樣的朋友 (feat. Luantan Ascent); 9. 自我催眠; 10. Love Me
Alone The Way 為你的寂寞唱歌	Released: 31 December 2013; Label: B'in Music; Formats: CD, digital download	Track listing: 1. 為你的寂寞唱歌; 2. 不等於; 3. 不置可否; 4. 也許,也許你愛我; 5. 巧克力; 6. 我沒資格; 7. 快樂快了; 8. 睡衣Party; 9. 50個或許; 10. 不自由; 11. 潺潺; 12. 塵埃; 13. 命運
Still Missing 還是想念	Released: 30 December 2016; Label: B'in Music; Formats: CD, digital download	Track listing: 1. 家家歌 (feat. Ilid Kaolo and Suming); 2. 看透; 3. 還是想念; 4. 漂流; 5. HEY; 6. 相愛無事; 7. 愛人的自我修養; 8. 帶我回家; 9. I Love You Bon Bon; 10. 無關了; 11. 家家酒; 12. 曾經美麗過

=== Live albums ===
Title	Album details	Track listing
Fly to You 2015 Wind Beneath My Wings Concert Live [我遇見你] 2015 『飛』 演唱會還原現場全曲目LIVE	Released: 12 January 2016; Label: B'in Music, Warner Music Taiwan; Formats: CD, digital download	Track listing: 1. Over the Rainbow (Live); 2. Unforgettable (Live); 3. Chocolate (Live); 4. Laws of Separation (Live); 5. 50 Possibilities (Live); 6. Talking 1 (Live); 7. Happy (Live); 8. Tears of Appreciation (Live); 9. I Love You (Live); 10. I Won't Let You Be Lonely (Live); 11. Happiness Coming (Live); 12. Fate (Live); 13. Band Members Introduction (Live); 14. Love Like Fireworks (Live); 15. Unfree (Live); 16. Unanswerable (Live); 17. Talking 2 (Live); 18. Once the Night Comes (Live); 19. Unqualified (Live); 20. Close to You (OT: They Long To Be Close to you); 21. Fly to You (Live); 22. Wind Beneath My Wings (Live); 23. Talking 3 (Live); 24. Emptiness of My Soul (Live); 25. Murmur of Water (Live); 26. Dust (Live); 27. Ancient Melody + Wandering + the Dull – Ice Flower (Live); 28. Sing for Lonely Souls + Contentment (Live); 29. Fill in the Blank (Live)

=== Other works ===
- Mayday 3DNA (五月天追夢3DNA電影原聲帶, 2011)
- Prince of Lan Ling Original Soundtrack (兰陵王電視原聲帶, 2013): "Fate" (命運)
- MAYDAY NOWHERE World Tour LiVe 2CD (诺亚方舟 世界巡回演唱会Live 2CD, 2013)
- Scarlet Heart 2: Original TV Soundtrack (步步驚情電視原聲帶, 2014): "Dust" (塵埃)

== Filmography ==
=== Film ===
Year	English title	Mandarin title	Role	Notes
2009	Almost Famous	阿踩的明星夢	Wu Tsai	
2017	The Lego Batman Movie	—N/a	Mayor McCaskill	Taiwanese version, voice

== Concert tours ==
Headlining

- Still Missing Tour (2017)

Opening act

- Mayday – Life World Tour (2017)

== Awards and nominations ==
Year	Award	Category	Nominated work	Result
2007	18th Golden Melody Awards	Best Vocal Collaboration (as Hao-en and Jiajia)	Blue in Love	Won
2013	24th Golden Melody Awards	Best New Artist	Unforgettable	Nominated
2013	24th Golden Melody Awards	Best Female Vocalist – Mandarin	Unforgettable	Nominated
2014	25th Golden Melody Awards	Best Female Vocalist – Mandarin	Alone The Way	Nominated
2017	28th Golden Melody Awards	Best Female Vocalist – Mandarin	Still Missing	Nominated
