= Hebe Tien discography =

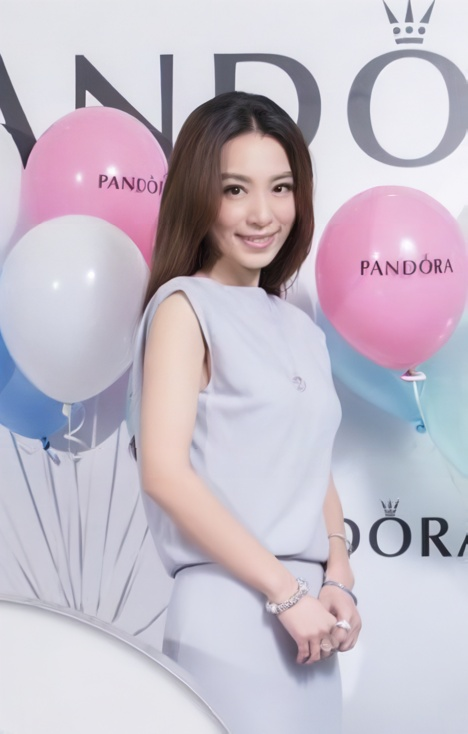
- Tien in 2017
- Studio albums: 5
- Live albums: 2
- Music videos: 32

Taiwanese singer Hebe Tien (Chinese: 田馥甄) has released five studio albums and five live albums. She debuted as a member of the Taiwanese girl-group S.H.E in 2001. Tien released her debut solo album, To Hebe, in 2010. The soundtrack "A Little Happiness", released for the film Our Times (2015), saw commercial success in East Asia.

== Albums ==
=== Studio albums ===
List of studio albums, with release date, label, and sales shown
Title	Album details	Peak chart positions	Sales
Title	Album details	TWN	Sales
To Hebe	Released: 3 September 2010; Label: HIM International Music; Formats: CD, digital download, streaming	—	TWN: 50,000
My Love	Released: 2 September 2011; Label: HIM International Music; Formats: CD, digital download, streaming	3	TWN: 62,000
Insignificance	Released: 29 November 2013; Label: HIM International Music; Formats: CD, digital download, streaming	1	
Day by Day	Released: 8 July 2016; Label: HIM International Music; Formats: CD, digital download, streaming	—	TWN: 70,000
Time Will Tell	Released: 25 September 2020; Label: Pourquoi Pas Music; Formats: CD, digital download, streaming	—	
The Land of Maybe	Released: 24 September 2026; Label: Pourquoi Pas Music; Formats: CD, digital download, streaming	—	

=== Live albums ===
Title	Album details
Love! To Hebe	Released: 3 December 2010; Label: HIM; Formats: DVD, digital download
To My Love	Released: 20 January 2012; Label: HIM; Formats: DVD, digital download
If Only	Released: 9 December 2016; Label: HIM; Formats: DVD, digital download
If Plus	Released: 8 December 2017; Label: HIM; Formats: DVD, digital download
Sound of My Dream Live	Released: 14 December 2016; Label: HIM; Formats: digital download
Day by Day Live	Released: 5 November 2017; Label: HIM; Formats: digital download

== Singles ==
Title	Year	Album
"Leave Me Alone"	2010	To Hebe
"Love"	2010	To Hebe
"My Love"	2011	My Love
"Still in Happiness"	2011	My Love
"A Better Rival in Love"	2011	My Love
"Angel Devil"	2011	My Love
"Flower"	2012	My Love
"Make Trouble Out of Nothing"	2012	My Love
"Insignificance"	2013	Insignificance
"You Better Not Think About Me"	2013	Insignificance
"Learning From Drunk"	2013	Insignificance
"Passion"	2014	Non-album single
"Shi Wan Xi Pi"	2015	Non-album single
"Love Yourself"	2016	Day by Day
"Every Day is a Miracle"	2016	Day by Day
"Stay"	2018	Non-album single
"Anything Goes"	2020	Time Will Tell
"One, after Another"	2020	Time Will Tell
"You Should Know about It"	2020	Time Will Tell
"A Song for You"	2020	Time Will Tell
"The Irony of Love"	2020	Time Will Tell
"It Is The Hour"	2022	Non-album single
"Glimpses of a Journey"	2023	Non-album single
"On Three"	2025	Non-album single

== Soundtrack appearances ==
Title	Year	Album
"Too Much"	2001	Girls' Dorm
"Love You for Me"	2001	Girls' Dorm
"Ferris Wheel"	2005	Reaching for the Stars
"Only Have Feelings for You" (feat. Fahrenheit)	2006	Tokyo Juliet
"Too Late"	2007	Bull Fighting
"Farewell Song" (feat. Tien by Sandee Chan)	2008	What If It Matters
"Love! My Love"	2012	Love
"A Little Happiness"	2015	Our Times
"Pretty Woman"	2015	Go Lala Go 2
"As It Is"	2015	A Touch of Green
"Too Much"	2016	Irreplaceable
"Beauty and the Beast (Chinese)" (feat. Jing Boran)	2017	Beauty and the Beast
"Friend that Loved a Long Time"	2018	Us and Them
"Miserable Warmth"	2018	Here to Heart
"Jasper Night"	2018	Long Day's Journey Into Night
"Still Early"	2019	Midnight Diner
"One Week Friends"	2022	One Week Friends
