= Lone =

Lone may refer to:

== People ==
- Destroy Lonely, a nickname for the artist
- Lone (given name), a given name (including a list of people with this name)
- Lone (musician), Matt Cutler, an electronic musician from Nottingham, United Kingdom
- Lone (surname), a surname (including a list of people with this surname)
- Lone Fight (disambiguation), a family name

== Places ==
- Lone (river), a river of Baden-Württemberg, Germany
- Lone, Kristiansand, a village in Kristiansand Municipality, Norway
- Lone Grove, Oklahoma
- Lone Jack, Missouri
- Lone Mountain (disambiguation)
- Lone Oak (disambiguation), a number of places with the same name
- Lone Peak
- Lone Pine (disambiguation), a number of places with the same name
- Lone Rock (disambiguation), a number of places with the same name
- Lone Teepee
- Lone Tree (disambiguation), a number of places with the same name

== Art and entertainment ==
- Lone (album), a 2014 live album by Ai Aso
- "Lone", a song by Tyler, the Creator, from the album Wolf
- "Lone", a song by What So Not
- Lone, a comic by Stuart Moore
- Lone Sloane, a French comic character

== Other uses ==
- Loner, a person who avoids or does not actively seek human interaction
- Lone (caste), a Kashmiri caste
- Lone Guides (or Lones), Girl Guides or Girl Scouts who don't attend meetings
- Lone Scouts, similar to Lone Guides
- Lone pair, an unbonded electron pair

== See also ==
- Ione (disambiguation)
- Loan
- Lonely (disambiguation)
- Lone Star (disambiguation)
- Lone Wolf (disambiguation)
