= Loneliness (disambiguation) =

Loneliness is a complex and usually unpleasant emotional response to isolation or lack of companionship.

Loneliness may also refer to:

- "Loneliness" (short story), a short-story by Charles Bukowski
- Loneliness (album), a 2009 album by Evan Yo
- Loneliness, a 1988 album by Sanchez
- "Loneliness" (song), a song by the German DJ Tomcraft
- "Loneliness", a song by Helen Reddy from Free and Easy
- "Loneliness", a song by Flobots from The Circle in the Square
- "Loneliness", a song by Robert Forster from Warm Nights

== See also ==
- Lonely (disambiguation)
- Lonely Is the Night (disambiguation)
- Lonely Night (disambiguation)
- Lonely Nights (disambiguation)
