= It Is the Hour =

Single by Hebe Tien
- Language: Mandarin
- English title: It is the Hour
- Released: 25 February 2022
- Venue: Dongyanshan Forest Recreation Area
- Genre: Mandopop
- Length: 3:59
- Label: Pourquoi Pas Music
- Composer: Evan Yo
- Lyricist: Guo Hong-an (郭宏安)
- Producer: George Chen (陳建騏)

Hebe Tien singles chronology
"You Should Know about It" (2020)	"It Is the Hour" (2022)	"One Week Friends" (2022)

Music video
- "It is the Hour" on YouTube

"It Is the Hour" (Chinese: 現在是什麼時辰了; pinyin: Xiànzài shì shénme shíchénle) is a song recorded by Taiwanese singer Hebe Tien released on 25 February 2022 under PQP Music. It is the second song from her Live in Life series which is a continuation of her project from her previous label, HIM International Music. The song was inspired by the poem "Be Drunk" by French poet Charles Baudelaire and was written by Guo Hong-an.

== Background and release ==
On 20 August 2018, Tien released "Stay", a live recording single as part of her Live in Life series. Tien had been constantly mesmerized by the sounds around her and have always wanted to lay music and vocals on top of them. Tien mentioned her scenic travel on a boat with her parents on their way to Wuzhen as the inspiration for "Stay", and since then, she noted other inspirations such as the sounds of collapsing icebergs while filming the music video for her song "Insignificance", and the sounds of the hospital monitors, the baby's heartbeat and first cry when she was in the delivery room while her S.H.E bandmate Ella was giving birth. "Stay" would become Tien's last release from her former label, HIM.

On 15 February 2022, Tien and PQP released the first teaser, "feel", shot in a forest with bird sounds. The second teaser, "look", was released on 18 February 2022, and included behind-the-scene footages of musicians and production staff in the backdrop of the forest. The third and final teaser, "listen", was released on 21 February 22 and included a footage of Tien's mic with the S.H.E logo and herself singing in the forest.

On 24 February 2022, Tien held a press conference confirming the continuation of her One, After Another tour in Kaohsiung which was postponed due to the ongoing COVID-19 pandemic, and announcing the release of her new song. According to Tien, the single is in line with her recently found love of hiking in forests, "I really like the forest and aside from being touched, there is another kind of feeling".

The single "It is the Hour" and the music video was released on 25 February 2022.

== Music video ==
The recording and music video was filmed in Dongyanshan Forest Recreation Area. It was directed by Bill Chia who worked on her previous music videos. The music video included footages of the production team setting up, Tien and the musicians performing in the forest.

== Personnel ==
Credits adapted from QQ Music liner notes, and the music video.

- Hebe Tien – vocals
- Brandy Tien (布蘭地) – background vocals
- Blackie Wu (吴加恩) – arrangement
- Limtiok (林逐) – arrangement
- George Chen (陳建騏) – arrangement, piano arrangement
- Evan Yo – piano arrangement
- Huang Qunlun (黃群輪) – bass
- Romi Yung (容沛誼) – keyboard
- Eric Hsu (徐研培) – guitar
- YoYo/Wu Deng Kai (吳登凱) – cello
- Allen Wu (吳沛奕) – handpan
- Ziya Huang (黃文萱) – live mixing engineer
- SHENB (沈冠霖) – live production assistant
- Insert Studio (音色製作) – equipment coordinator
