= The Land of Maybe =

Studio album by Hebe Tien
- Released: 24 September 2026
- Genre: Mandopop
- Length: 0:36:55
- Language: Mandarin
- Label: Pourquoi Pas Music
- Producer: George Chen (陳建騏)

Hebe Tien chronology
Time Will Tell (2020)	The Land of Maybe (2026)

The Land of Maybe (Chinese: 要去什麼地方) is the sixth studio album by Taiwanese Mandopop artist Hebe Tien. The digital album was released on 24 September 2026 by Pourquoi Pas Music, followed with the CD album to be released on 11 December of the same year. It was produced by George Chen, who was the producer for her previous album, Time Will Tell as well.

== Background and release ==
Tien's fifth studio album, Time Will Tell was released on 25 September 2020, and concluded her second concert tour One, After Another. At the 32nd Golden Melody Awards, Tien received the Best Female Mandarin Singer award for the album, along two other awards out of seven nominations.

In 2025, Tien embarked on the Field Survey: Live in Life Tour and released the single "On Three" as part of the tour's promotion.

On 31 March 2026, after the singer's birthday, Tien teased her upcoming sixth album. and on 17 September, she officially announced that the production has been wrapped up and is already slated for release on the 24th. The visuals of the album were filmed on location in the Faroe Islands and was personally involved in all the logistics such as flight bookings and accommodations, and worked closely with her photographer. The title of the album was derived from how the locals termed the Faroe Islands as the "land of maybe" due to its unpredictable weather.

On 24 September 2026, Tien's sixth album The Land Of Maybe was released on digital platforms, with the CD album slated to be released on 11 December. Unlike her previous albums, there were no released singles prior to the release of the album. According to Tien, the song selection process took three years, discovering what suits her voice best and where she is at life currently. Argentine illustrator Aliana Luz was invited to handcraft the album's visual lines and imagery styling, using a vivid, saturated blue as her primary colour choice, which aims to offers a sense of healing and peace.

== Track listing ==
No.	Title	Lyrics	Music	Length
1.	"大船" (Lost and Wandering)	Sam Yang (楊世暄)	Sam Yang (楊世暄)	3:12
2.	"要去什麼地方" (The Land Of Maybe)	Sam Cheng (鄭敬儒)	Sam Cheng (鄭敬儒)	3:48
3.	"雲" (Here, Then Gone)	Hogan T. (鄒序)	Hogan T. (鄒序)	3:24
4.	"乾淨的房間" (Room To Begin)	Angie Su (蘇研之)	Song Shi-yao (宋世堯)	3:56
5.	"值得紀念的垃圾" (The Hoarder)	MCKY (米奇林); The Crane (鶴)	MCKY (米奇林); The Crane (鶴)	4:06
6.	"烏鴉" (The Dark Speaks)	Howe Chen (陳君豪); David Ke (葛大為)	Howe Chen (陳君豪)	3:45
7.	"蹉跎" (Time Well Wasted)	David Ke (葛大為)	Andr; MANDARK; Howe Chen (陳君豪)	3:22
8.	"坍塌" (Silent Implosion)	Sam Cheng (鄭敬儒)	Sam Cheng (鄭敬儒)	3:34
9.	"靜脈" (Deep In The Veins)	David Ke (葛大為)	Mono Yang (楊格)	3:53
10.	"果" (Fruit)	Wu Qing-feng	Howe Chen (陳君豪)	3:55
