= To Hebe =

- To Hebe cover

Studio album by Hebe Tien
- Released: 3 September 2010
- Studio: HIM Recording Studio; Mega Force Studio (Taipei); Dave Yang Studio (Taipei); Platinum Studio (Taipei)
- Genre: Mandopop
- Length: 41:58
- Language: Mandarin
- Label: HIM International Music
- Producer: Alex Chang-Chien (張簡君偉); Bing Wang

Hebe Tien chronology
To Hebe (2010)	My Love (2011)

To Hebe is the debut Mandarin solo studio album of Taiwanese Mandopop artist Hebe Tien, of girl group S.H.E. It was released on 3 September 2010 by HIM International Music. Tien is the first S.H.E member to release a solo album. The preorder edition contains a bonus DVD with eight tracks from Tien's 27th birthday party charity concert, "330 Music Tien Birthday Party" held on 20 March 2010.

The tracks, "寂寞寂寞就好" (Leave Me Alone) and "LOVE!" are listed at number 11 and 35 respectively on Hit Fm Taiwan's Hit Fm Annual Top 100 Singles Chart (Hit-Fm年度百首單曲) for 2010. The album is tied fifth best selling album in Taiwan in 2010, with Rainie Yang's Rainie & Love...?, with 50,000 copies sold.

The album was also nominated for Best Mandarin Album at the 22nd Golden Melody Awards in 2011. It won Best Music Video for "寂寞寂寞就好" (Leave Me Alone) directed by Hsu Yun-Hsuan (徐筠軒) and Best Single Producer for "LOVE!".

== Background and development ==
Hebe Tien launched her career through the Taiwanese girl group S.H.E under HIM International Music along with her group mates Selina and Ella. On September 11, 2001, during the September 11 attacks, S.H.E released their debut album, Girls' Dorm, in memory of their prior living quarters, selling an impressive 150,000 copies for a debut group quashing speculations of unremarkable debut due to the incident. Since debut, S.H.E has released twelve studio albums and received numerous awards and nominations. Tien has since appeared in Taiwanese dramas and has been featured in a few singles. The group's label acknowledged each of the member's strengths and for Tien who loved singing since her childhood, HIM arranged and planned a solo album for her which was in preparation for two years.

Tien intended to release an album where she can sing diverse musical genres that are different from the music of S.H.E. Therefore, she named her album To Hebe as a personal album to show "the girl who loves to sing" and to sing songs she would sing for herself, and to share her different moods to everyone.

== Reception ==
=== "Small Island" controversy ===
Almost twelve years after the release of the album, and following the critical reaction of the People's Republic of China (PRC) to the Speaker of the United States House of Representatives Nancy Pelosi's visit to Taiwan, various Chinese music streaming platforms such as Migu Music and QQ Music removed the track "Small Island" from their streaming service, with the former removing all of Tien's work and her artist information from the platform entirely. According to Little Pinks, the lyrics, "I think that this distance is good, we don't bother each other across the sea," hints about Taiwan independence. The line, "I am a small island, I can't handle great troubles. Tourists, please come back early next time," was also assumed to mean that Mainland tourists are not welcome to visit Taiwan.

== Track listing ==
No.	Title	Lyrics	Music	Arrangement	Length
1.	"Love??"	Aki Huang (黃淑惠)	Aki Huang (黃淑惠)	Bing Wang (王治平)	1:27
2.	"To Hebe"	Sandee Chan	Sandee Chan	Hsu Chien Hsiu (徐千秀)	3:57
3.	"Small Island" (離島)	Derek Shih (施人誠)	Chet Lam	Allen Lu (盧家宏)	3:35
4.	"Going Nowhere" (沒有管理員的公寓)	Yuen Chen (陳信延)	John Yuan (袁惟仁)	Mac Chew	4:03
5.	"Sorry For Myself" (我對不起我)	Albert Leung	Wang Xiao Yu (王小愚)	Yu Huan Li (李雨寰)	4:14
6.	"I Didn't Think I'm In Love With You" (我想我不會愛你)	Kang (呂康惟)	Kang (呂康惟)	JerryC	3:41
7.	"Leave Me Alone" (寂寞寂寞就好)	Derek Shih (施人誠)	Venk Yang (楊子樸)	Baby C (鍾興民)	4:35
8.	"Missing You" (你太猖狂)	Albert Leung	Salsa Chen (陳小霞)	Bing Wang (王治平)	4:05
9.	"Super Mario" (超級瑪麗)	Lan Xiaoxie (藍小邪)	Terrytyelee (梁永泰), Wang Zhi Yin (王知音)	Allen Lu (盧家宏)	4:42
10.	"To Children (with Yoga Lin)" (給小孩)	Derek Shih (施人誠)	John Lee	Yanis Huang (黃雨勳)	4:23
11.	"Love !"	Aki Huang (黃淑惠)	Aki Huang (黃淑惠)	Bing Wang (王治平)	3:16
Total length:					41:58

330 Music Tien Birthday Party (Bonus DVD)
No.	Title	Original artist(s)	Length
1.	"Change My Heart Oh God"	Eddie Espinosa
2.	"Nostalgia" (懷念)	Faye Wong
3.	"Save Me From Myself"	Christina Aguilera
4.	"Speechless Flower" (無言花)	Jody Chiang
5.	"Not Going Anywhere"	Keren Ann
6.	"330 Thinking of You" (330想想你)	Ella Chen
7.	"Scarf" (圍巾)	S.H.E
8.	"Love" (愛情)	Karen Mok
9.	"That Day" (那天)	Faith Yang

== Personnel ==
Credits from the album's liner notes.

Musicians

- Hebe Tien – vocals, background vocals (all tracks)
- Yoga Lin – vocals, background vocals (track 10)
- Fan Zhezhong (樊哲忠) – guitar (tracks 1, 8, 11)
- Allen Lu (盧家宏) – guitar (tracks 3, 9)
- Again (蔡科俊) – guitar (track 4)
- JerryC – guitar (track 6)
- James Ni (倪方來) – guitar (track 7)
- Huang Xianzhong (黄顯忠) – drums (tracks 5, 6, 8)
- Rafael Lee (李守信) – drums (tracks 9, 11)
- Wei Feng 威楓(仔仔) – drums (track 8, 11)
- Wang Zheng Yi (汪正一) – bass (track 2)
- Michael Ning (甯子達) – bass (tracks 5, 8, 9, 11)
- Bing Wang (王治平) – synth Moog (track 8)
- Yu Tsang Li (李雨蒼) – violin (track 5)
- Jenny Chen (陳怡蓁) – violin (track 11)
- Wei Sun (孫瑋) – strings (track 5)

Technical

- Alex Chang-Chien (張簡君偉) – executive producer
- Chuman Chu (楚怡辰) – executive producer (track 4)
- Bing Wang (王治平) – harmony composer (tracks 1, 3, 6, 8, 11)
- Ma Yu-fen (馬毓芬) – harmony composer (track 5, 10)
- Guo Wenzong (郭文宗) – harmony composer (track 7)
- Terrytyelee (梁永泰) – harmony composer (track 9)
- Martin (馬丁) – sound engineer
- AJ Chen (陳文駿) – sound engineer (track 2), mixing (track 2)
- Chief Wang (王永鈞) – sound engineer (tracks 4, 9, 11)
- Eugene Ke (柯宗佑) – sound engineer (tracks 5, 6, 8)
- Jiang Ziqiang (蔣自強) – sound engineer (track 9)
- Dave Yang (楊大緯) – mixing (tracks 1, 3, 5, 7, 8, 9, 11)
- Adam Huang (黃欽勝) – mixing (track 4)
- Craig Burbidge – mixing (tracks 6, 10)

Music video

- Bill Chia (比爾賈) – director (track 2, 11)
- Hsu Yun-Hsuan (徐筠軒) – director (track 7)
- Shockley Huang (黃中平) – director (track 8)
- bounce – director (track 6, 9)

== Music videos ==
Song	Director	Release date	Notes	Link
LOVE!	Bill Chia (比爾賈)	August 16, 2010	Official animated version	MV
Leave Me Alone (人間煙火)	Hsu Yun-Hsuan (徐筠軒)	August 27, 2010	Official music video	MV
LOVE?		September 7, 2010	Official music video	MV
Missing You (你太猖狂)	Shockley Huang (黃中平)	September 14, 2010	Official music video	MV
To Hebe	Bill Chia (比爾賈)	October 1, 2010	Official music video	MV
I Don't Think I Am In Love With You (我想我不會愛你)	bounce	November 2, 2010	Official music video with footages from To Hebe Live	MV
Super Mario (超級瑪麗)	bounce	December 2, 2010	Official music video with footages from To Hebe Live	MV

== Awards and nominations ==
22nd Golden Melody Awards, Taiwan - 2011
Award	Nomination	Result
Best Mandarin Album	To Hebe	Nominated
Best Music Video	"寂寞寂寞就好" (Leave Me Alone) - Director Gaugau Hsu (徐筠軒)	Won
Best Single Producer	"LOVE!" - Bing Wang (王治平)	Won
Best Packaged Album	To Hebe - Nie Yong Zhen (聶永真)	Nominated
