= Alip Ba Ta =

Indonesian guitarist (born 1989)

- Born: Alif Gustakhiyat; June 21, 1989 (age 36); Ponorogo, East Java, Indonesia
- Occupation: Guitarist Songwriter
- Years active: 2018–present
- Spouse: Rani

YouTube information
- Channel: Alip_Ba_Ta
- Genre: Various
- Subscribers: 6.07 million
- Views: 523 million
- Last updated: September 20, 2025

Alif Gustakhiyat (Indonesian: [ˌalɪf ɡʊst̪aˈxijat̪̚]; born June 21, 1989), a YouTuber better known by his online alias Alip_Ba_Ta (or simply Alip Ba Ta), is an Indonesian fingerstyle guitarist who often uploads his performances to YouTube.

== Personal life ==
Gustakhiyat was born on June 21, 1989, in Ponorogo, East Java. He has a wife named Rani and two children named Aqila and Aqilah. According to various sources, Gustakhiyat has earned over IDR 8,800,000,000 (US$579,818.80) from his song covers on YouTube. He has nonetheless chosen to work as a forklift driver. Gustakhiyat lives in a relatively small home and lives a "humble" lifestyle.

== Career ==
Gustakhiyat started playing guitar when he was in high school. He learned to play guitar by himself by watching videos on YouTube. He started uploading his performances to YouTube in 2011 and gained popularity after he uploaded a video of him playing "Canon Rock" by JerryC in 2016.

== Notability ==
Gustakhiyat gained notability for his fingerstyle guitar covers of popular songs which he uploads to YouTube. His song covers have been praised by several musicians including Synyster Gates of Avenged Sevenfold. He has also gained praise from Indonesian conductor, Addie MS for his "unique" technique and ability to play the guitar.

Gustakhiyat has performed live concerts in Indonesia and other countries such as Italy, Germany, and Malaysia.

== Covers ==
This table includes some of Gustakhiyat's covers along with the original creator of the song, when the video was published, and the number of views on YouTube, Facebook, Instagram, and TikTok, as of April 2023:

| Song | Creator | Date Published | Views (in million) |
|---|---|---|---|
| Sweet Child o' Mine | Guns N' Roses | 2018-07-15 | 28 |
| Bohemian Rhapsody | Queen | 2018-11-02 | 24.5 |
| My Heart Will Go On | Celine Dion | 2018-08-31 | 22 |
| Nothing Else Matters | Metallica | 2018-09-28 | 18.3 |
| Stairway to Heaven | Led Zeppelin | 2020-06-26 | 16.9 |
| November Rain | Guns N' Roses | 2020-05-22 | 13.5 |
