= Owl Creek (Colorado) =

Physical characteristics
- Source
  - coordinates: 40°59′35″N 104°47′27″W
- Mouth
  - location: Confluence with the Lone Tree
  - coordinates: 40°32′32″N 104°39′14″W
  - elevation: 4,793 ft (1,461 m)

Basin features
- Progression: Lone Tree—South Platte—Platte; Missouri—Mississippi

Owl Creek is a tributary of Lone Tree Creek in Weld County, Colorado. The creek flows south from a source near the northern border of Weld County to a confluence with Lone Tree Creek east of Eaton.

== See also ==
- List of rivers of Colorado
