= Ione =

Ione may refer to:

== Places ==
- Ione, California, a city
- Ione, Colorado, an unincorporated community
- Ione, Nevada, an unincorporated community
- Ione, Oregon, a city
- Ione, Washington, a town
- Ionopolis or Ione, an ancient town near Antioch

== People ==
- Ione Band of Miwok Indians, a federally recognized tribe in California
- Ione Belarra (born 1987), Spanish politician
- Ione Biggs (1916–2005), American human rights activist
- Ione Borges (1951–2025), Brazilian television presenter and actress
- Ione Christensen (1933–2025), Canadian politician
- Ione Virginia Hill Cowles (1858–1940), American clubwoman, social leader
- Ione Wood Gibbs (c. 1871–1923), American educator, journalist, and clubwoman
- Ione Grogan (1891–1961), American academic and educator
- Ione Genevieve Shadduck (1923–2022), American educator, women's rights activist, and attorney
- Ione Skye (born 1970), British-American actress

== Other uses ==
- List of storms named Ione, five tropical cyclones worldwide
- Ione (plant), a genus of orchids
- Ione (crustacean), a genus of isopod in the family Ionidae
- Ione (mythology), one of the Nereids in Greek mythology
- Ione (group), a Kazakh girl group

== See also ==
- Iona (disambiguation)
- Lone (disambiguation)
