= Insignificance (Hebe Tien album) =

Studio album by Hebe Tien
- Released: 29 November 2013
- Studio: HIM Recording Studio; Lights Up Studio; Jet Studio (Beijing); Leijaxuan Recording Studio; Mega Force Studio (Taipei); Memory Moment Studio (Beijing)
- Genre: Mandopop
- Length: 0:44:22
- Language: Mandarin
- Label: HIM International Music
- Producer: Bing Wang; Guo Wenzong; Rex Lu; Bernard Zheng (鄭楠); Alex Chang Jien (張簡君偉)

Hebe Tien chronology
My Love (2011)	Insignificance (2013)	Day by Day (2016)

Singles from Insignificance
- 1. "Insignificance (渺小)" Released: 10 November 2013; 2. "You Better Not Think About Me (你就不要想起我)" Released: 25 November 2013; 3. "Learning From Drunk (不醉不會)" Released: 19 December 2013

Insignificance (Chinese: 渺小; pinyin: Miǎoxiǎo) is the third studio album of Taiwanese singer Hebe Tien, released on 29 November 2013 by HIM International Music and contains ten tracks. Pre-orders for the album started on 13 November 2013 and included a ticket to an exhibit curated by director and the album's visual art director Bill Chia to promote the album. The song and the whole album was conceptualized when Tien shared one of her favorite poems "Under One Small Star" to her colleague, mentioning that she was enchanted by the verses, and hoped that the lyrics for the album will showcase a similar passion. Graphic designer Aaron Nieh was employed to design the album. Both Chia and Nieh received two nominations at the 25th Golden Melody Awards for Best Music Video for "Insignificance" and Best Packaged Album, respectively.

== Background ==
Following Tien's second studio album My Love which received seven nominations at the 23rd Golden Melody Awards, solo endorsements, and S.H.E's first leg of their fourth concert tour 2gether 4ever which was wrapped up in Singapore on 26 October 2013, HIM International Music released a video teaser of Tien in a snowy landscape in Iceland with the numbers 20131113, narrated with an excerpt from the poem "Under One Small Star" by Polish poet and 1996 Nobel Prize in Literature recipient Wisława Szymborska. A follow-up teaser was released on 1 November 2013, revealing the title of the upcoming album. During the press conference for the exhibit, Tien mentioned that she had a lot of doubts and frustrations when she debuted in her 20s, but felt her "balance" after acknowledging her "insignificance" as she learned more about the world.

== Release ==
On 13 November 2013, the music video for the song "Insignificance" directed by Bill Chia was released. Tien worked with Hong Kong lyricist Chow Yiu-fai for the song. The music video which was shot in a snowy setting in Iceland where Tien witnessed collapsing icebergs reinforced her realizations about her insignificance, and the importance of environmental protection. On 25 November 2013, the music video for "You Better Not Think About Me" featuring Taiwanese actor Fu Meng-po was released. Derek Shih who wrote the song "Leave Me Alone" from her debut album To Hebe worked on the lyrics.

Tien released the official track listing of the album through her Facebook on 25 November 2013, and Insignificance was officially released on 29 November 2013.

On 12 December 2019, Tien released the music video for the song "Learning From Drunk". Throughout 2014, Tien released the music videos for "Forever Love", "Contradictory", "Fickle", and "He's Gone". On 18 April 2014, Tien released the Record of Insignificance DVD which includes eight music videos and footages from the exhibit.

On 3 August 2018, an LP version of the album was released by HIM.

== Promotion ==
The pre-order edition of the album included a ticket for the audio-visual exhibit titled Record of Insignificance which was held on 17 November to 1 December 2013 in Songshan Cultural and Creative Park to promote the album.

On 4 December 2013, Tien held a small concert in Kaohsiung which was priced at 500 yuan per ticket, and was only open to 120 people. The event received backlash online from fans who were unable to secure their tickets, accusing HIM of cash-grabbing. Tien was hurt and shed tears during the concert. She signed autographs after the performance and personally refunded each fan's 500 yuan. It was reported that the production cost of the event is reached 100,000 yuan which is more than the total of 60,000 yuan from ticket sales. Another schedule for the mini concert was scheduled in Taichung on 20 December 2013, and in Taipei on 3 January 2014.

On 5 January 2014, Tien was invited as the unveiling ambassador for the 5th annual Chinese New Year's Eve TV special Super Star Red and White Talent Awards held in NTU Sports Center. She performed her song "LOVE!" from her debut album, and "Forever Love" and "Learning From Drunk" from the new album.

To support the album Tien kicked off her first solo concert tour "IF" on 6 December 2014 in Taipei Arena. 22,000 tickets for the two-day concert were reportedly sold out within ten minutes.

== Track listing ==
No.	Title	Lyrics	Music	Arrangement	Length
1.	"Insignificance" (渺小)	Chow Yiu-fai (周耀輝)	Venk Yang (楊子樸)	JerryC	4:44
2.	"Contradiction" (矛盾)	Daryl Yao (姚若龍)	Bernard Zheng (鄭楠)	Han Likang (韓立康)	4:41
3.	"The Most Important Thing in Life" (終身大事)	Lan Xiaoxie (藍小邪)	D-panney (苗小青)	JerryC	4:00
4.	"Learning From Drunk" (不醉不會^{[a]})	Albert Leung	Liu Dajiang (劉大江)	JerryC	3:51
5.	"Uncertain Happiness" (你快樂未必我快樂)	Lan Xiaoxie (藍小邪)	Aki Huang (黄淑惠)	Martin Tang	4:39
6.	"He's Gone" (這個人已經與我無關)	Wyman Wong	Guo Wenzong (郭文宗)	Agwen Yu (于京延)	4:34
7.	"You Better Not Think About Me" (你就不要想起我)	Derek Shih (施人誠)	Venk Yang (楊子樸), Liu Dajiang (劉大江)	Eric Hung, Phil Wen (溫奕哲)	4:40
8.	"Fickle" (無常)	Lan Xiaoxie (藍小邪)	Bernard Zheng (鄭楠)	Bernard Zheng (鄭楠)	4:20
9.	"Forever Love" (愛著愛著就永遠)	Jennifer Hsu (徐世珍), Wu Huifu (吳輝福)	Alex Chang Jien (張簡君偉)	Roger Yo (游政豪), Fan Zhezhong (樊哲忠)	4:26
10.	"Temperature of Pocket" (口袋的溫暖)	Chang Zheng (常正), Derek Shih (施人誠)	Salsa Chen (陳小霞)	Han Likang (韓立康)	4:27
Total length:					44:22

=== Notes ===
- ^{^a} track is not available in Mainland version

== Personnel ==
Credits from the album's liner notes.

Musicians

- Hebe Tien – vocals, background vocals (all tracks)
- Fan Zhezhong (樊哲忠) – background vocals (track 7), guitar (track 9)
- Han Likang (韓立康) – guitar (tracks 2, 10)
- JerryC – guitar, bass (tracks 3, 4)
- Mellow Wang (王漢威) – guitar (track 6)
- Bing Wang (王治平) – guitar (track 7)
- Xue Feng (薛峰) – guitar (track 8)
- Michael Ning (甯子達) – bass (track 2)
- Huang Xianzhong (黄顯忠) – drums (track 2)
- Mr.Q (陳柏州) – drums (track 7)
- Juju (具具) – drums (track 8)
- Agwen Yu (于京延) – violin, cello (track 6)
- Chi Lee String Orchestra (于京延) – strings (track 8)

Technical

- Guo Wenzong (郭文宗) – harmony composer (tracks 1, 2, 3, 4, 6, 7, 9)
- Bing Wang (王治平) – harmony composer (track 5)
- Bernard Zheng (鄭楠) – harmony composer (track 8)
- Agwen Yu (于京延) – strings composer (track 6)
- Martin (馬丁) – sound engineer (all tracks)
- Eugene Ke (柯宗佑) – sound engineer (track 2)
- Hao Yu (郝宇) – sound engineer (track 8)
- Zhao Huitao (趙會濤) – sound engineer (track 8)
- Craig Burbidge – mixing (tracks 1, 2, 5, 10)
- Adam Huang – mixing (track 3)
- Dave Yang – mixing (tracks 4, 6, 7, 9)
- Zhao Jing – mixing (track 8)
- Fan Zhezhong (樊哲忠) – production assistant (track 3, 4, 6, 7)

Music video

- Bill Chia (比爾賈) – director (tracks 1, 2, 4, 6, 8, 10)
- Hsu Yun-Hsuan (徐筠軒) – director (track 7)

== Accolades ==
The song "Insignificance" is listed at number seven on Hit Fm Taiwan's Annual Top 100 Singles Chart (Hit-Fm年度百首單曲) for 2013.

25th Golden Melody Awards, Taiwan - 2014
Award	Nomination	Result
Best Music Video	"渺小" (Insignificance) - Director Bill Chia (比爾賈)	Nominated
Best Packaged Album	Insignificance - Aaron Nieh (聶永真)	Nominated
