= Lonely =

Lonely or The Lonely may refer to:

- Loneliness, an emotional response to perceived isolation

== Music ==
=== EPs ===
- Lonely (Frente! EP) or the title song, 1994
- Lonely (Spica EP) or the title song, 2012

=== Songs ===
- "Lonely" (2NE1 song), 2011
- "Lonely" (Akon song), 2005
- "Lonely" (Casey Donovan song), 2017
- "Lonely" (DaBaby and Lil Wayne song), 2021
- "Lonely" (Diplo song), 2019
- "Lonely" (Eddie Cochran song), 1960
- "Lonely" (Joel Corry song), 2020
- "Lonely" (Jonghyun song), 2017
- "Lonely" (Justin Bieber and Benny Blanco song), 2020
- "Lonely" (Maluma and Jennifer Lopez song), 2020
- "Lonely" (Mao Abe song), 2010
- "Lonely" (Matoma song), 2018
- "Lonely" (Medina song), 2010
- "Lonely" (Merril Bainbridge song), 1998
- "Lonely" (Nana song), 1997
- "Lonely" (Peter Andre song), 1997
- "Lonely" (Shannon Noll song), 2006
- "Lonely" (Sistar Song), 2017
- "Lonely" (Tracy Lawrence song), 2000
- "L-O-N-E-L-Y", by Bobby Vinton, 1965
- "The Lonely" (British Sea Power song), 2002
- "The Lonely" (Christina Perri song), 2011
- "Lonely", by Acker Bilk, 1962
- "Lonely", by Alan Walker from Different World, 2018
- "Lonely", by American Music Club from California, 1988
- "Lonely", by Atreyu from Congregation of the Damned, 2010
- "Lonely", by Attack Attack! from Attack Attack!, 2010
- "Lonely", by Ayra Starr from 19 & Dangerous, 2021
- "Lonely", by B1A4 from Who Am I, 2014
- "Lonely", by Bon Jovi from Lost Highway, 2007
- "Lonely", by Brian McKnight from Back at One, 1999
- "Lonely", by Britney Spears from Britney, 2001
- "Lonely", by Chloe x Halle from Ungodly Hour, 2020
- "Lonely", by Crimson Glory from Transcendence, 1988
- "Lonely", by Danny Brown from Old, 2013
- "Lonely", by Demi Lovato featuring Lil Wayne from Tell Me You Love Me, 2017
- "Lonely", by Emeli Sandé from Long Live the Angels, 2016
- "Lonely", by Foreigner from Can't Slow Down, 2009
- "Lonely", by Gabry Ponte and Jerome, 2020
- "Lonely", by Hyolyn from Love & Hate, 2013
- "Lonely", by Illenium from Ascend, 2019
- "Lonely", by Imagine Dragons from Mercury – Act 1, 2021
- "Lonely", by Jamila Woods from Heavn, 2016
- "Lonely", by Janet Jackson from Rhythm Nation 1814, 1989
- "Lonely", by Julian Lennon from Valotte, 1984
- "Lonely", by Kara from Lupin, 2010
- "Lonely", by Lauv from Fuck, I'm Lonely, 2019
- "Lonely", by Líbido from Lo Último que Hable Ayer, 2005
- "Lonely", by Lil Pump, 2021
- "Lonely", by Machine Gun Kelly from Tickets to My Downfall, 2020
- "Lonely", by Nav from Nav, 2017
- "Lonely", by Ne-Yo from In My Own Words, 2006
- "Lonely", by Noah Cyrus from The End of Everything, 2020
- "Lonely", by Palaye Royale from The Bastards, 2020
- "Lonely", by PrettyMuch, 2021
- "Lonely", by Pseudo Echo from Ultraviolet, 2014
- "Lonely", by RM from Indigo, 2022
- "Lonely", by Tom Waits from Closing Time, 1973
- "Lonely", by Tones and I from Welcome to the Madhouse, 2021
- "Lonely", by The Word Alive from Violent Noise, 2018
- "Lonely (Amy's Theme)", by the Lovin' Spoonful from You're a Big Boy Now, 1967

== Other uses ==
- Lonely (fashion label), a New Zealand clothing brand
- "The Lonely", a 1959 episode of The Twilight Zone

== See also ==
- Alone (disambiguation)
- Lone (disambiguation)
- Loneliness (disambiguation)
