= Red Scarf (song) =

- Album cover

Single by WeiBird
- Language: Chinese
- Released: November 5, 2021
- Genre: C-pop
- Length: 4:34
- Label: Sony Music
- Songwriter: Giddens Ko
- Composers: WeiBird; Jerry C

WeiBird singles chronology
"Cheap Love" (2021)	"Red Scarf" (2021)

Music video
- "Red Scarf" on YouTube

"Red Scarf" (Chinese: 如果可以; pinyin: Rúguǒ Kěyǐ; Wade–Giles: Ju^{2}-kuo^{3} K'o^{3}-i^{3}) is a song by Taiwanese singer WeiBird. The song served as the theme song for the film Till We Meet Again.

== Background ==
In an interview, WeiBird said that the song was recorded at a basement studio with JerryC.

== Personnel ==
Credits adapted from Apple Music.

Musicians

- WeiBird – Vocals, Background Vocals
- International Master Philharmonic Orchestra – Strings
- Jerry C – Guitar

Technical

- WeiBird – Composer, Vocal Arranger
- Giddens Ko – Lyrics
- Shrio Kou – Mixing Engineer
- You Zheng Hao – String Arranger
- JerryC – Arranger, Composer, Producer, Vocal Arranger, Recording Engineer

== Commercial performance ==
The song amassed more than 75 million views on YouTube. The song was also featured on THE F1RST TAKE.

== Language covers ==
The song was covered in both Japanese and Korean. Fujii Mayu from AKB48 wrote the Japanese lyrics.

== Charts ==
Weekly chart performance for "Red Scarf"
Chart (2022–2024)	Peak position
Malaysia (Top 10 Chinese Singles)	1
Hong Kong (Billboard)	2
Singapore (RIAS Top Streaming Chart)	2
Singapore (RIAS Top Regional Chart)	1
