= Day by Day (Hebe Tien album) =

- 日常

Studio album 日常 by Hebe Tien
- Released: 13 July 2016
- Genre: Mandopop
- Length: 40:10
- Language: Mandarin
- Label: HIM International Music

Hebe Tien chronology
Insignificance (2013)	Day by Day (2016)	Time Will Tell (2020)

Day by Day (Chinese: 日常) is the fourth studio album by Taiwanese Mandopop artist Hebe Tien from the girl group S.H.E. It was released on 13 July 2016 by HIM International Music.

== Track listing ==
No.	Title	Lyrics	Music	Length
1.	"日常" (Day by Day)	Xiaoxie Lan (藍小邪)	Eric Ng (黃韻仁)	2:53
2.	"人間煙火" (Every day is a Miracle)	Derek Shih	Boon Hui Lu	4:05
3.	"無用" (Useless)	Xiaoxie Lan (藍小邪)	Karencici (林愷倫)	4:09
4.	"身體都知道" (Your Body Speaks)	Yuen Chen (陳信延)	Boon Hui Lu	3:57
5.	"念念有詞" (Beautiful Prophecy)	David Ke (葛大為)	A-FLIGHT (崔欽翔)	3:21
6.	"靈魂伴侶" (Soul mate)	Xiaoxie Lan (藍小邪)	Bernard Zheng (鄭楠)	4:40
7.	"餘波盪漾" (When you are gone)	Jennifer Hsu (徐世珍), Wu Hui Fu (吳輝福)	Li Shuang Fei (李雙飛)	4:52
8.	"什麼·哪裡" (What, where)	Chow Yiu-fai (周耀輝)	Agwen Yu (于京延)	4:19
9.	"慢舞" (Pace your heart)	Daryl Yao (姚若龍)	Aki Huang (黃淑惠)	4:05
10.	"獨善其身" (Love yourself)	Xiaoxie Lan (藍小邪)	Bernard Zheng (鄭楠)	3:47
Total length:				40:10

== Music videos ==
Song	Director	Release date	Notes	Link
Every day is a Miracle (人間煙火)	Mel Hsieh	June 18, 2016	Lyric Video	MV
When you are gone (餘波盪漾)	DJ Chen (陳映蓉)	July 8, 2016	Featuring Bryan Chang	MV
Every day is a Miracle (人間煙火)	Jinsoo Chung	July 13, 2016	Official music video inspired by the novel Diana of the Crossways	MV
Love yourself (獨善其身)	Bill Chia (比爾賈)	July 28, 2016	Shot inside a rotating room	MV
Soul mate (靈魂伴侶)	Gaugau Hsu (徐筠軒)	August 22, 2016	Featuring Japanese model Suzuki Yuki (鈴木有樹), shot in Japan	MV
Useless (無用)	Bill Chia (比爾賈)	October 22, 2016	Shot in a messy room to depict her uselessness after a breakup	MV
Day by Day (日常)	Shockley Huang (黃中平)	January 26, 2017	Hebe Tien visits Yilan County for a "one day small farmer" experience	MV

== Awards and nominations ==
28th Golden Melody Awards, Taiwan - 2017
Award	Nomination	Result
Best Music Video	"獨善其身" (Love Yourself) - Director Bill Chia (比爾賈)	Nominated
Best Single Producer	"人間煙火" (Every day is a Miracle) - Sandee Chan (陳珊妮)	Nominated
