= Go Lala Go 2 =

- Poster
- Chinese: 杜拉拉追婚记 (China) 追婚日記 (Taiwan)
- Directed by: Andrew Chien
- Screenplay by: Gou Xingyan
- Based on: A novel by Ke Li
- Produced by: Hang Liu; Xu Jian
- Starring: Ariel Lin; Vic Zhou; Chen Bolin
- Cinematography: Dylan Doyle
- Edited by: Wenders Li
- Music by: Yu Ming-hsun
- Production companies: New Classics Media; Fox International Channels
- Distributed by: New Classics Pictures
- Release date: November 11, 2015 (China)
- Running time: 101 minutes
- Country: China
- Language: Mandarin
- Box office: CN¥50 million

Go Lala Go 2 (Chinese: 杜拉拉追婚记) is a 2015 Chinese romantic comedy-drama film directed by Andrew Chien and starring Ariel Lin, Vic Zhou and Chen Bolin. The film is based on a novel and is a sequel to the 2010 film Go Lala Go!. It was released on December 4, 2015.

== Cast ==
- Ariel Lin as Du Lala
- Vic Zhou as David Wang
- Chen Bolin as Stanley Chen
- Nana as Sha Dangdang (voice dub: Liu Meihan)
- Vivian Wu as Maggie
- Michelle Chen as Carrie
- Li Jiahang as Ah Le
- John Chiu as Lin Daiyu (voice dub: Xu Ke)
- Austin Lin as Xiao Wen
- Cindy Sun as Xiao Li
- Tony as Howard
- James Yang Yong Cong 楊永聰 as James
- Yin Hang as Xiao Yi
- Liang Chen as Liang Wei
- Du Juan as Host
- Qiu Muhan

== Production ==
The film was shot in Shanghai, Ko Samui and Taiwan.

== Soundtrack ==
Title	Performer	Lyricist	Composer
"Pretty Woman"	Hebe Tien	Lan Xiaoxie	Zheng Nan
"If I Were a Song"	Yoga Lin	Yoga Lin, Derek Shih, Andrew Chien	Yoga Lin
"Have I Ever Been to Me"	Where Chou	Andrew Chien	Kenneth Hirsch and Ronald N. Miller
"Might as Well"	Janice Yan	Andrew Chien	JerryC
"Give You All My Love"	Yen Chih-lin (Power Station)	Zhang Pengpeng	JerryC
"Let's Boom!"	Judy Chou	Andrew Chien	Yu Ming-hsun
"Make You Feel My Love"	Yoga Lin	Bob Dylan	Bob Dylan

== Reception ==
The film grossed CN¥50 million in China.
