= Lone Oak =

Lone Oak may refer to:

- Lone Oak, California, former name of Lonoak, California
- Lone Oak, Georgia
- Lone Oak, Kansas
- Lone Oak, Kentucky
- Lone Oak, Tennessee
- Lone Oak, Texas, a city in Hunt County

== See also ==
- Judge Joseph Crockett House, also known as Lone Oak, a historic house in Hopkinsville, Kentucky
- Lone Oaks, a historic Greek Revival mansion in the Greater Deyerle neighborhood of Roanoke, Virginia
- Lone Oak High School (disambiguation)
