= Time Will Tell (Hebe Tien album) =

- Time Will Tell cover

Studio album 無人知曉 by Hebe Tien
- Released: 25 September 2020
- Genre: Mandopop
- Length: 0:46:06
- Language: Mandarin
- Label: Pourquoi Pas Music
- Producer: George Chen (陳建騏)

Hebe Tien chronology
Day by Day (2016)	Time Will Tell (2020)	The Land Of Maybe (2026)

Singles from Time Will Tell
- 1. "Let It... (懸日)" Released: 14 January 2020; 2. "Anything Goes (皆可)" Released: 11 June 2020; 3. "One, after Another (一一)" Released: 3 July 2020; 4. "You Should Know about It (先知)" Released: 28 July 2020; 5. "A Song for You (或是一首歌)" Released: 21 August 2020; 6. "The Irony of Love (諷刺的情書)" Released: 8 September 2020

Time Will Tell (Chinese: 無人知曉) is the fifth studio album by Taiwanese Mandopop artist Hebe Tien from the girl group S.H.E. The CD album was released on September 25, 2020, followed by LP record that was released on 4 November 2020. This is the first studio album released through her new label Pourquoi Pas Music (PQPMusic) and partnership with her management A TUNE Music, after parting ways with her previous label HIM International Music.

At the 32nd Golden Melody Awards, Tien was awarded the Best Female Mandarin Singer for Time Will Tell, along with two other awards out of seven nominations.

== Background and development ==
In September 2018, Tien along with the other S.H.E members officially left HIM International Music after 17 years and founded her own management company, A TUNE Music (樂来樂好). On December 29, 2018, Tien released her first song after her departure from HIM, "Jasper Night" for the Chinese film Long Day's Journey into Night and will eventually release "Still Early" for the film Midnight Diner, her first song released in cooperation with PQPMusic in September 2019.

On April 30, 2019, Tien as the director of A TUNE Music held a press conference to announce her partnership with PQPMusic. In the press conference, there were five bricks and two crabs cleverly juxtaposed with the logos of the two companies hinting at Tien's fifth studio album and her second concert tour. It was then revealed that both projects already entered the preparatory stage.

== Release ==
On January 14, 2020, at 12 noon, Tien released her first single "Let It..." across digital music platforms without prior announcements and hinted at the release of her fifth album. Tien worked with photographer Li Hui for the visuals of the single. The music video was slated to be released on the 17th but in a press conference for a contact lens brand on the 18th, Tien said that there had been difficulties releasing the music video for the time being. She also revealed that the album will be released within the year and that she almost finished recording. The music video was eventually released on June 1, 2020, featuring Tien as a gynecologist meeting his college couple portrayed by Greg Han, 20 years after they graduated, and broke 1 million views in 30 hours.

On June 11, 2020, Tien released her second single "Anything Goes", the first song that was chosen for the new album. The music video which was shot around the rocky areas of national parks in Los Angeles, California was released on the 12th. On the 25th, it was announced that her second concert tour "One After Another Tour" to promote her upcoming album will kick off at Taipei Arena on September 25, 26 and 27. 33,000 tickets sold out in a minute when sales opened and another 11,000 tickets for the 28th which has been added also sold out within 30 seconds. She is the second artist to hold a concert in Taiwan during the COVID-19 pandemic following Eric Chou.

On July 3, 2020, Tien released her third single "One, after Another", and was accompanied by a music video released on the 10th. The music video was reported to cost 11 million NTD to produce. It received a nomination for Best Music Video at the 32nd Golden Melody Awards. On July 28, 2020, Tien followed up with her fourth single "You Should Know about It" and a music video with QR codes as the main element.

On August 17, 2020, Tien's fifth studio album Time Will Tell has been revealed. Dutch freelance photographer Astrid Verhoef was specially invited to create the main visuals for the album. The album visuals were taken in the American Southwest region. The reveal was followed by her fifth single "A Song For You" which was released on the 21st. Tien went to Taitung with the band Deca Joins to film the music video for the single which was then released on the 25th. On September 8, 2020, Tien released her sixth single "The Irony of Love". The music video featured Taiwanese actress Sandrine Pinna sitting in front of a vanity in a revolving room employing a one-shot long take video.

Following her fourth album Day by Day which was released 4 years prior, Tien released her fifth studio album Time Will Tell on September 25, 2020.

== Track listing ==
No.	Title	Lyrics	Music	Length
1.	"Intro"	Deca Joins	Deca Joins	1:45
2.	"先知" (You Should Know about It)	David Ke (葛大為)	Bryan Chang (張博彥); Tsungn Kai Wang (王宗凱); Tae Wan Kim; Nemo Lin; Ling Kai (鈴凱)	5:01
3.	"田" (Crop Circles)	Monday Nightz	Yuk-cheung Chun (秦旭章)	3:55
4.	"底里歇斯" (Hysteria)	Chow Yiu-fai (周耀輝)	Sleepy_Wifi (安眠巫師); Chuan Liu (川流)	3:55
5.	"一一" (One, after Another)	Radio Mars (火星電台)	Radio Mars (火星電台)	4:11
6.	"皆可" (Anything Goes)	Shadya Lan (藍小邪)	Terence Lam (林家謙)	4:31
7.	"無人知曉" (Nobody Knows)	David Ke (葛大為)	Alice Xie (謝馨哲); Meng Wu (吳萌)	4:49
8.	"諷刺的情書" (The Irony of Love)	Dean Ting (丁世光)	Dean Ting (丁世光)	4:19
9.	"人什麼的最麻煩了" (Humans are the Worst)	QUARK	QUARK	4:28
10.	"懸日" (Let It...)	David Ke (葛大為)	John Stoniae (知更)	4:38
11.	"或是一首歌" (A Song for You)	Deca Joins	Deca Joins	4:34

== Music videos ==
Song	Director	Release date	Notes	Link
Let It... (懸日)	Yin Chen-Hao (殷振豪)	1 June 2020	Featuring Greg Han	MV
Anything Goes (皆可)	Hsu Yun-Hsuan (徐筠軒)	12 June 2020	Shot in Los Angeles	MV
One, after Another (一一)	Muh Chen (陳奕仁)	10 July 2020	Shot with 4Dviews dynamic volumetric video technology	MV
You Should Know about It (先知)	Jeff Chang (張時霖)	30 July 2020	QR code was used as the visual element	MV
A Song for You (或是一首歌)	Leo Liu (劉立)	25 August 2020	Featuring Deca Joins, shot in Taitung	MV
The Irony of Love (諷刺的情書)	Gavin Yin (尹國賢)	11 September 2020	Featuring Sandrine Pinna, shot using one-shot long take video style	MV
Untold (無人知曉)	Bill Chia (比爾賈)	12 October 2020	Hebe Tien acts as a long blonde alien who was unable to let humans understand her love to them	MV
Hysteria (底里歇斯)	Remii Huang (黃婕妤)	16 November 2020	Story plot revolves around internet addiction	MV
Crop Circles (田)	Bill Chia (比爾賈)	5 February 2021	Shot at Dingtoue Sandbar in Tainan, and a specially carved WiFi symbol in a Chiayi cornfield	MV
Humans are the Worst (人什麼的最麻煩了)	Tan Tsung-fan (談宗藩)	29 April 2021	Hebe Tien skates around Taipei public streets	MV

== Awards and nominations ==
32nd Golden Melody Awards, Taiwan - 2021
Award	Nomination	Result
Album of the Year	Time Will Tell	Nominated
Best Mandarin Album	Time Will Tell	Nominated
Best Music Video	"One, after Another" (一一) - Muh Chen (陳奕仁)	Nominated
Best Lyricist	"Untold" (無人知曉) - David Ke (葛大為)	Won
Best Album Producer	Time Will Tell - George Chen (陳建騏)	Won
Best Female Mandarin Singer	Time Will Tell - Hebe Tien (田馥甄)	Won
Best Album Design	Time Will Tell - Yueh Yueh Liu (劉悅德)	Nominated
