= Lone Tree =

Lone Tree or Lonetree can refer to:

== Cities or towns ==
- Lone Tree, Colorado
- Lone Tree, Indiana
- Lone Tree, Iowa
- Lone Tree, Missouri
- Lone Tree, Oklahoma
- Lone Tree Corners, Illinois
- Lonetree, Montana
- Lonetree, Wyoming

== Townships or municipalities ==
- Rural Municipality of Lone Tree No. 18, Saskatchewan
- Lone Tree Township, Clay County, Iowa
- Lone Tree Township, Minnesota
- Lone Tree Township, Clay County, Nebraska
- Lone Tree Township, Merrick County, Nebraska

== Monuments and cemeteries ==
- Lone Tree Cemetery, Fairview, California, Fairview, California
- Lone Tree Commonwealth War Graves Commission Cemetery, Heuvelland, Belgium
- Lone Tree Monument

== Creeks ==
- Lone Tree Creek (Colorado), a tributary that joins the South Platte River in Weld County, Colorado east of Greeley
- Lone Tree Creek, San Joaquin County, a stream tributary to the San Joaquin River, in San Joaquin County and Stanislaus County, California

== People ==
- Clayton J. Lonetree, a person

== Other ==
- Lone Tree Brewery, an Israeli brewery in Gush Etzion
- Lone Tree Ferry, a historical ferry in Omaha, Nebraska
- Lone Tree Community School District, a public school district based in Lone Tree, Johnson County, Iowa, USA
