= My Love (Hebe Tien album) =

Studio album by Hebe Tien
- Released: 2 September 2011
- Genre: Mandopop
- Length: 0:42:24
- Language: Mandarin
- Label: HIM International Music
- Producer: S.H.E

Hebe Tien chronology
To Hebe (2010)	My Love (2011)	Insignificance (2013)

My Love is the second studio album of Taiwanese Mandopop artist Hebe Tien, of girl group S.H.E. It was released on September 2, 2011 by HIM International Music and contains ten tracks. The pre-order opened on August 17, 2011 and came with a bag. The album received seven nominations at the 23rd Golden Melody Awards.

== Background and development ==
After a year of releasing her debut album To Hebe, Tien continued with the keyword "love", the title of her song from the previous album. Following the release of her debut album and her S.H.E group mate Selina's accident while filming a drama in Shanghai, Tien experienced ups and downs. According to her, people think about a lot of issues in life and feel lonely so they need love and support. Tien named her album My Love to express her love for music and to convey her love and sing to the people about the things she love.

The song "妳" written by Sodagreen lead vocalist Wu Qing-feng was the first song recorded for the album and is dedicated by Tien to her group mate Selina and sent to her when recording finished. Tien recalled that when she first recorded the song, she was too emotional that she cried her eyes out and couldn't sing, so she had to calm herself and record again the next day. The song was written during Selina's accident so she had mixed feelings but couldn't express them. Before writing the song, Qing-feng looked up the S.H.E members on Weibo and was moved by the deep friendship of the three.

== Track listing ==
No.	Title	Lyrics	Music	Length
1.	"烏托邦" (Utopia)	Katie Lee	Sandee Chan	3:32
2.	"要說什麼" (What to Say?)	Hebe Tien	Shu Hui Huang	4:00
3.	"My Love"	Ren Cheng Shi	Nan Zheng	5:10
4.	"請你給我好一點的情敵" (A Better Rival in Love)	Katie Lee	Deserts Chang	4:24
5.	"還是要幸福" (Still in Happiness)	Jennifer Hsu	Alex Zhang Jian	4:43
6.	"魔鬼中的天使" (Devil Angel)	Daryl Yao	Salsa Chen	3:58
7.	"無事生非" (Make Trouble Out of Nothing)	Jian Zhou Huang	Johnny	4:16
8.	"花花世界" (Flower)	Shadya Lan	Alex Zhang Jian	4:07
9.	"影子的影子" (Shadow's Shadow)	Katie Lee	Cheer Chen	4:30
10.	"妳" (You)	Greeny Wu	Greeny Wu	3:44
Total length:				42:24

== Music videos ==
Song	Director	Release date	Link
My Love	Bill Chia (比爾賈)	August 18, 2011	MV
Still in Happiness (還是要幸福)	Gaugau Hsu (徐筠軒)	September 1, 2011	MV
A Better Rival in Love (請你給我好一點的情敵)	Chen Hung-i (陳宏一)	September 19, 2011	MV
Angel Devil (魔鬼中的天使)	Bill Chia (比爾賈)	October 13, 2011	MV
Flower (花花世界)	bounce	January 6, 2012	MV
Make Trouble Out of Nothing (無事生非)	bounce	January 6, 2012	MV

== Awards and nominations ==
23rd Golden Melody Awards, Taiwan - 2012
Award	Nomination	Result
Best Mandarin Album	My Love	Nominated
Best Music Video	"My Love" - Director Bill Chia (比爾賈)	Nominated
Best Single Producer	"A Better Rival in Love" (請你給我好一點的情敵) - Wang Zhi Ping (王治平)	Nominated
Best Lyrics	"A Better Rival in Love" (請你給我好一點的情敵) - Lee Ge Di (李格弟)	Nominated
Best Composition	"A Better Rival in Love" (請你給我好一點的情敵) - Jiao An Pu (焦安溥)	Nominated
Best Arrangement	"A Better Rival in Love" (請你給我好一點的情敵) - Fan Zhe Zhong (樊哲忠)	Nominated
Best Mandarin Female Singer	Hebe Tien (田馥甄)	Nominated
