= Lim Jeong-hyun =

South Korean guitarist (born 1984)

funtwo
- Also known as: funtwo, Oscar Lim
- Born: July 5, 1984 (age 42); South Korea
- Origin: Seoul, South Korea
- Genres: Rock, Instrumental Rock
- Occupation: Musician
- Instrument: Guitar
- Years active: 2004–present
- Website: http://www.funtwo.us

- Lim Jeong-hyun
- Hangul: 임정현
- Hanja: 林正鉉
- RR: Im Jeonghyeon
- MR: Im Chŏnghyŏn

Lim Jeong-hyun (Korean: 임정현; born July 5, 1984), also known by the online alias funtwo, is a South Korean guitarist known for his cover of the piece Canon Rock.

== Canon Rock cover ==
Lim played and recorded his cover of "Canon Rock" by JerryC on October 23, 2005. He uploaded his video to the popular South Korean music website Mule.co.kr. A YouTube user named "guitar90" uploaded the Mule video to YouTube under the title guitar, with the introductory comment "this guy iz great!!!". The identity of guitar90 is unknown.

In March 2016, the original YouTube video was restored and is once again publicly available. The video still holds the views before it was taken down in 2011.

Lim's cover of "Canon Rock" has been mentioned on CNN, 20/20, The New York Times, and National Public Radio, in addition to MBC news, CBC Radio, KBS news, and other South Korean news stations.

Many viewers have speculated and thought of the video as fake because the audio is not synchronized with the video. Lim later stated to The New York Times that this had to do with the fact that "he recorded the audio and video independently and then matched them inexactly." The performance itself was recorded in two parts, and edited together. An image of a traffic light was used to make the transition.

== Other activities ==
Lim has now started to arrange well-known music by himself. He composed a holiday card to his fans called "Carol Rock (funtwo Is Coming to Town)", a rock version of "Santa Claus is Coming to Town". He also played Dream Theater's "Overture 1928", and recently he posted a video of himself performing Antonio Vivaldi's "Summer" from the Four Seasons, one of Vivaldi's most famous works.

Lim initially expressed no wish to carry on playing as a professional guitarist. However his online fame has allowed him to play to live audiences several times— once for the South Korean ambassador in Washington, DC, then again at the KORUS festival the same year. At the KORUS festival, Lim played improvised, altered versions of the Korean national anthem and the American national anthem. The third time he played was in 2008, the November 22, at the YouTube Live festival where he performed with Joe Satriani, he played first a mix of Canon Rock and Joe's "Surfing With the Alien" and then "Canon Rock". In October 2009, he was a featured performer at the fall ICANN meeting's welcoming ceremony and later joined in at their music night. In the same interview in which he stated his wish to carry on playing guitar simply as a hobby, he also rated his own playing a modest 150/60 out of 100.

The beginning of the music video for Weezer's song "Pork and Beans" is set in Lim's iconic room, with the various members playing their various instruments. The video as a whole contains references to numerous other internet phenomena.

== Pieces ==
=== Funtwo ===
1. Canon Rock
2. Overture 1928
3. Summer
4. Carol (funtwo is coming to town)
5. Mission (Main Theme)
6. I'm Alright (Neil Zaza)
7. Triptych (Daita of Siam Shade)
8. Zenith (Daita)
9. Happy Birthday To You
10. Bumble
11. Mule Jam Project (Remix of Smoke on the Water by Deep Purple)
12. Carol 2009

== Sources ==
- The REAL Real Funtwo Comes Forward: By His Pinky You Will Know Him
