= Lone Mountain =

Lone Mountain may refer to a place in the United States:

- Lone Mountain, Tennessee, an unincorporated community
- Lone Mountain (California), a hill in San Francisco, California
  - Lone Mountain, San Francisco, California, the associated neighborhood
- Lone Mountain (Montana), a mountain in the Madison Range
- Lone Mountain, Nevada, a ghost town
- Lone Mountain (Elko County, Nevada)
- Lone Mountain (Eureka County, Nevada)
- Lone Mountain (New York), a mountain in Ulster County
- Lone Mountain State Forest, a mountain and state forest in Morgan County, Tennessee
