= Lone (given name) =

Lone is a given name. Notable people with this name include:

- Lone Drøscher Nielsen (born 1964), Danish wildlife conservationist
- Lone Dybkjær (1940–2020), Danish politician
- Lone Fischer (born 1988), German handball player
- Lone Fleming (born 1945), Danish actress appearing in Spanish films
- Lone Frank (born 1966), Danish science journalist
- Lone Hertz (born 1939), Danish film actress
- Lone Høyer Hansen (1950–2021), Danish sculptor
- Lone Mathiesen (born 1972), Danish handball player
- Lone Smidt Nielsen (born 1961), Danish footballer
- Lone Kroman Petersen (born 1950), Danish equestrian
- Lone Scherfig (born 1959), Danish film director and screenwriter
- Lone Wiggers (born 1963), Danish architect

== See also ==
- Lone (disambiguation)
- Lone (surname)
