= Hit FM Top 100 Singles of the Year =

Music record chart

Hit FM Top 100 Singles of the Year (Chinese: Hit FM年度百首單曲) is a music industry record chart that ranks the most popular songs in Taiwan, published yearly by Hit FM since 1998. Chart rankings are based on online poll in Taiwan.

The first number-one song on this chart was "Look Over Here, Girl" by Richie Jen in 1998. With five songs topping this chart, Jolin Tsai has the most number-one songs on this chart.

== Number-one singles ==
Year	Single	Artist(s)	Ref.
1998	"Look Over Here, Girl" (對面的女孩看過來)	Richie Jen	
1999	"First Love"	Hikaru Utada	
2000	"Tenderness" (溫柔)	Mayday	
2001	"Abandon" (任性)	Stefanie Sun	
2002	"Secret Sign" (暗號)	Jay Chou	
2003	"Encounter" (遇見)	Stefanie Sun	
2004	"Common Jasmine Orange" (七里香)	Jay Chou	
2005	"Nocturne" (夜曲)	Jay Chou	
2006	"Marry Me Today" (今天你要嫁給我)	David Tao & Jolin Tsai	
2007	"Sun Will Never Set" (日不落)	Jolin Tsai	
2008	"Onion" (洋蔥)	Aska Yang	
2009	"Sorry, Sorry"	Super Junior	
2010	"Honey Trap" (美人計)	Jolin Tsai	
2011	"Sailor Afraid of Water" (水手怕水)	Jay Chou	
2012	"I Won't Let You Be Lonely" (我不願讓你一個人)	Mayday	
2013	"Practice Love" (修煉愛情)	JJ Lin	
2014	"Play" (Play 我呸)	Jolin Tsai	
2015	"A Little Happiness" (小幸運)	Hebe Tien	
2016	"Twilight" (不為誰而作的歌)	JJ Lin	
2017	"Little Big Us" (偉大的渺小)	JJ Lin	
2018	"Ugly Beauty" (怪美的)	Jolin Tsai	
2019	"I Miss You More" (我比從前想你了)	Bii	
2020	"Untold" (無人知曉)	Hebe Tien	
2021	"Red Scarf" (如果可以)	William Wei	
2022	"Steal Your Love" (偷走你的心)	Nine Chen & Feng Ze	
2023	"Happily, Painfully After" (孤獨娛樂)	JJ Lin	
2024	"Friday Night" (星期五晚上)	Energy	
2025	"Golden"	Huntrix	

== See also ==
- List of best-selling albums in Taiwan
