= Girls' Dorm =

Studio album by S.H.E
- Released: September 11, 2001
- Recorded: 2000–2001
- Genre: Mandopop
- Length: 42:01
- Language: Mandarin
- Label: HIM International Music
- Producer: Guo Wenzong; Liu Tianjian; Huang Yi

S.H.E chronology
Girls' Dorm (2001)	Youth Society (2002)

Girls' Dorm (Chinese: 女生宿舍; pinyin: Nǚshēng Sùshè) is the debut studio album by Taiwanese girl group S.H.E. It was released in Taiwan and across Asia on September 11, 2001, by HIM International Music. Produced by Guo Wenzong, Liu Tianjian and Huang Yi, it incorporates music genres such as pop, R&B, pop rock, and eurobeat.

Despite being released on the same day as the September 11 attacks, the album experienced commercial success. Girls' Dorm sold 150,000 copies in Taiwan, making it one of the country's top twenty best-selling albums of 2001, and has since sold 750,000 copies throughout Asia. After the album's success, S.H.E was shortlisted for Best New Artist at the 13th Golden Melody Awards in 2002.

== Background and development ==
On August 8, 2000, HIM International Music held a singing competition titled "Universal 2000 Talent and Beauty Girl Contest" with the goal of finding new artists for them to sign to their label. The contest's finals were broadcast on China Television's TV Citizen; with the winner being Selina Jen. After some time Grand Music in addition handpicked finalists Hebe Tien and Ella Chen, placing the three girls into a girl group titled S.H.E. At the time of the formation, Jen, who was still in college, Tien, who was in high school, and Chen, who was in vocational school, took advantage of the school holidays to go north to Taipei for recording and training sessions. After Hebe and Ella graduated, the three S.H.E members prepared for their debut by rooming together in a college-styled dormitory so that their record label could test out their chemistry. The Chinese name for the album Nǚshēng Sùshè (女生宿舍) literally translates into girls dormitory, which pays tribute to the group's past living quarters.

S.H.E's management mapped out the styles of the three members at the time, and each gave them their representative English names: Selina is a name variant of Selene, the goddess of the Moon in Greek mythology. She represents "gentleness" and her representative color is pink. Hebe is named after Hebe, the goddess and personification of youth in Greek mythology and religion. She represents "confidence" and her representative color is green. Ella, who represents "courage," is an English short form of Helen, which is from the Greek Helene meaning "torch" or "light," and her representative color is blue. Selina revealed in 2009 that their English names were also changed to fit the group name. Selina named herself Cola, while Hebe was called Anita, while Ella called herself Water pre-debut.

== Writing and production ==
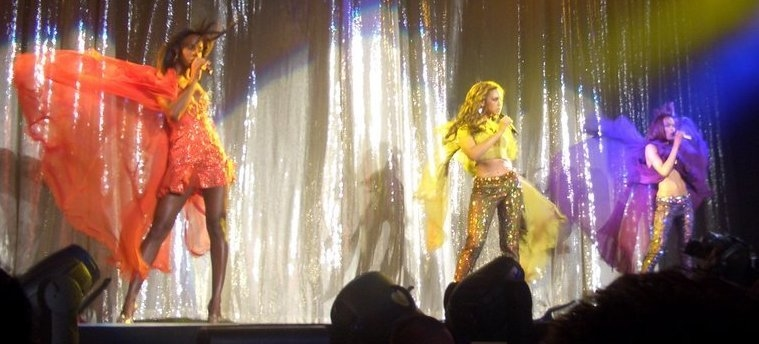
"Not Yet Lovers" is the Chinese version of Destiny's Child's "Brown Eyes"

Prolific musicians such as Power Station, Yuan Wei-jen, Tso An-an and Tanya Chua participated in the record's production. This album is the only one in which each member has her own solos to date: Hebe's solos were "Let Her Love You for Me" and "Too Much," Selina's "Forgot to Forget About You," and Ella's was "Don't". Labelmates Power Station composed the songs "Fridge" and "Are You All Right". Most of the lyrics in this album were written by Wu Hsiung; from Youth Society onwards, most of the lyrics are by Shi Rencheng.

"Not Yet Lovers" is a swoony R&B style song that was originally recorded under the title "Brown Eyes" by Destiny's Child for their 2001 blockbuster studio album Survivor. Beyoncé and Walter Afanasieff are both credited as composers on the track while the lyrics were translated into Mandarin Chinese by Derek Shih. Because the original singers were the most popular trio in the United States at the moment, S.H.E was nervous when they first learned that they were going to cover their song, fearing that their performance wouldn't be good enough. After seeing the lyrics and the staff explaining that the direction of the lyrics is different from the original song, they felt more at ease. While the lyrics of the original song are more mature, “Not Yet Lovers” depicts the anticipation of love and the sweetness of being in love, which is very much in line with S.H.E's age. "Beauty Up My Life" is a hyperactive Eurobeat styled track that is heavily influenced by Para Para and includes Japanese language lyrics.

Tanya Chua penned the folk-inspired number "Too Much." “Too Much” is one of Tien's favorite and most awaited songs, and she was both excited and nervous to collaborate with such a first-class musician. After hearing the demo of “Too Much” sung by Chua in English, she fell in love with the song and was deeply touched by Yao Qian's lyrics. "Are You All Right" uses a conversation between two good friends on the phone to express the feeling of comforting a friend's lovelorn love in the song.

== Release and promotion ==
The album was released on September 11, 2001. Its release coincided with the 9/11 terrorist attacks in the U.S., which dominated the media's attention in Taiwan. As a result, the news of the album's release was largely overshadowed, and some even speculated that S.H.E would disband soon. Additionally, Jay Chou's second album Fantasy was released around the same time, further overlooking the group's debut. Consequently, S.H.E's record company was unsure if the album would attract the public's attention.

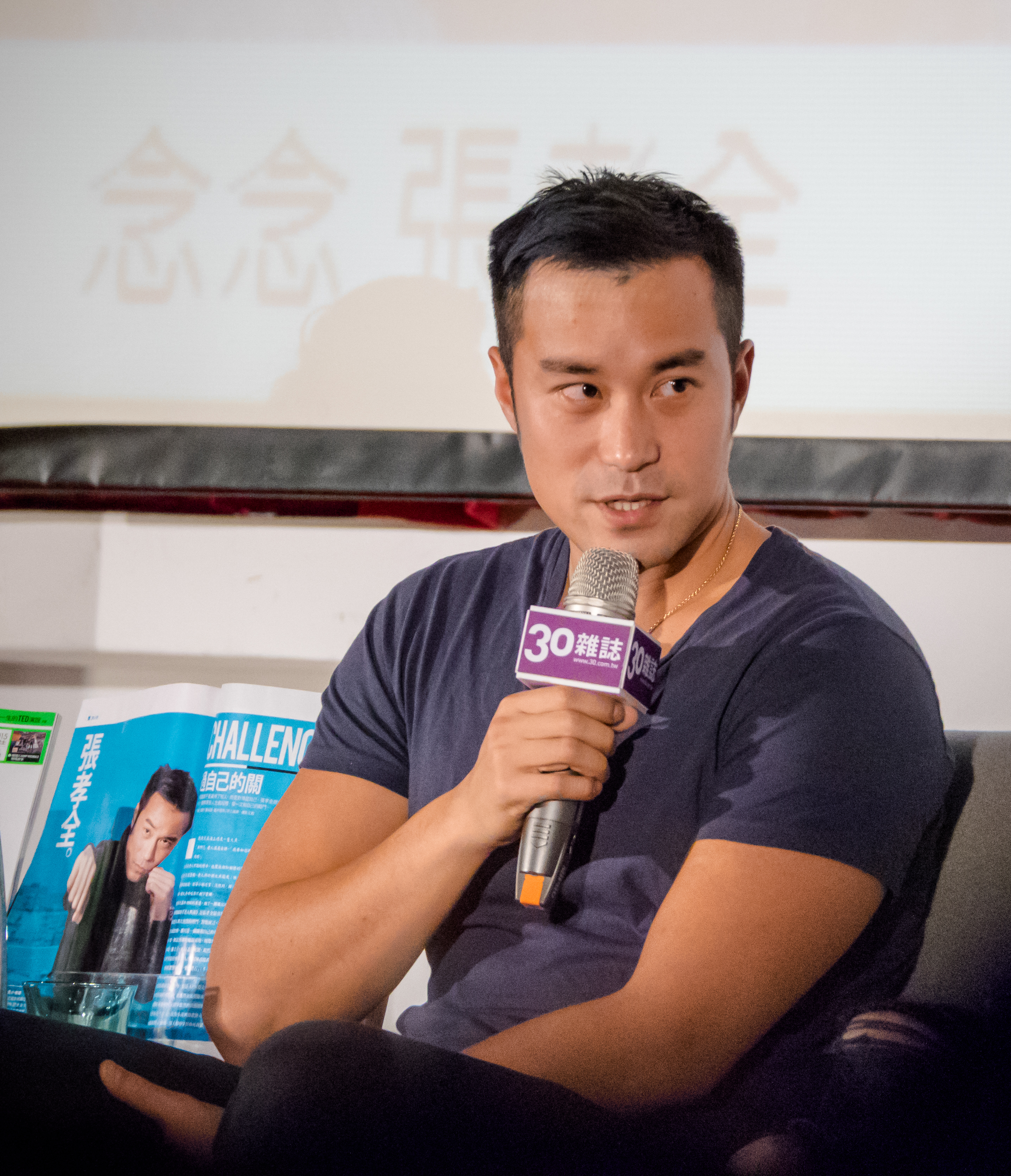
Joseph Chang, stars as the male lead in the music video for "Not Yet Lovers"

Three songs from Girl's Dorm, "Beauty Up My Life," "Too Much" and "He Is", was used to endorse Wacoal, SoGo and Digimaster, respectively. On October 27, 2001, S.H.E held a pajama party at a pub to celebrate the sales of their debut album reaching 100,000 copies. On December 20, 2001, a special VCD edition of the album called "Starlight Party Karaoke in Girls' Dormitory" was launched. The entire album was alternately broadcast as the ending theme of the Japanese and Taiwanese TV series Love Generation in Japan.

=== Singles and music videos ===
The video for "Not Yet Lovers" is directed by Ma Yizhong and tells a story of three girls (Selina, Hebe, and Ella) fawning over the same boy (Joseph Chang), but deciding that their friendship is evidently more valuable. The music video for "Beauty Up My Life" is directed by Yu Yongjie. Ma Yizhong directed the video for the song "Too Much." Lai Weikang directed the videos for "Are You All Right," He is Him," and "Fridge." The karaoke VCD included fully choreographed music videos for "Not Yet Lovers," "Beauty Up My Life," "Fridge," and "Too Much." In January 2002, the track "Not Yet Lovers" was listed at number three on Hit Fm Taiwan's Hit FM Top 100 Singles of the Year chart for 2001.

== Accolades ==
S.H.E was shortlisted for Best New Artist at the 13th Golden Melody Awards in 2002 for their work on this album.

== Track listing ==
No.	Title	Lyrics	Music	Arrangement	Length
1.	"戀人未滿" (Not Yet Lovers)	Derek Shih	Beyoncé Knowles, Walter Afanasieff	BabyC	4:36
2.	"Beauty Up My Life"	Wu Xiong, Tseng Chien Hao	Anan Zuo	David Lu	2:54
3.	"冰箱" (Fridge)	Wu Xiong	You Chiu Hsing	Ray Huang	4:28
4.	"H.B.O"	Wu Xiong, Anan Zuo	Anan Zuo	Ray Huang	3:34
5.	"Too Much" (Hebe solo)	Yao Chien	Tanya Chua	Tanya Chua	3:13
6.	"妳還好不好" (Are You All Right) (Selina and Ella duet)	Bai Jinfa	Kico Shih	Jay Hung	4:43
7.	"替我愛你" (Let Her Love You for Me) (Hebe solo)	Huang Tsu Yin	Tommy Wu	Tu Ying	4:46
8.	"他就是他" (He is Him)	Wu Xiong	Chen Ying Hsu	Ray Huang	4:35
9.	"別" (Don't) (Ella solo)	Wu Xiong	Judy Chen, Ian Chen, Chen Cheng Ching	Wu Ching Lung	4:23
10.	"忘記把你忘記" (Forgot to Forget about You) (Selina solo)	Wu Xiong	Anan Zuo	Wu Ching Lung	4:49
Total length:					42:01
