= Lonely (fashion label) =

New Zealand clothing label

- Product type: Clothing
- Current owner: Helene Morris and Steven Ferguson
- Country: New Zealand
- Introduced: 2003
- Previous owners: Aimee McFarlane
- Website: https://lonelylabel.com

Lonely is a lingerie, swimwear and clothing label based in New Zealand. It was established in 2009 by Helene Morris and Steven Ferguson, who had created the Lonely Hearts Club label in 2003. Morris began making soft-cup bras in 2009 alongside their main clothing brand, but switched focus to lingerie due to demand. Lingerie from the Lonely label has gained a cult following and is often worn by celebrities such as Kylie Jenner.

== Brand values and principles ==
The label is known for embracing body positivity by using a diverse range of models and by not retouching photos. In 2017, to promote body positivity, Lena Dunham and Jemima Kirk starred in a series of untouched photos wearing the brand's lingerie. In August that same year, Lonely promoted their Autumn-Winter collection with 56-year-old model Mercy Brewer. In 2017, the label worked with terminally ill teenager, Eva McGauley to donate towards the charity she established.

In terms of production processes, Morris has stated that the company wanted to strengthen and support the lives of manufacturers. In 2018, Lonely received criticism when they featured a model with self-injury scars.

In 2019, critics stated that while the brand's marketing promotes body positivity, it does not include fat bodies in their marketing, nor sell lingerie above size 16 and a G cup.

On 2 December 2020, an article by David Farrier and Zoe Walker Ahwa explored allegations that the owners were embracing QAnon conspiracy theories on social media and not taking COVID-19 seriously. Several staff members said they were told that there was no need for customers to sign in as it was a "breach of their privacy" and that employees were not required to wear personal protective equipment (PPE). In June 2020, thirteen staff members signed a letter to the owners expressing their concerns. Staff received a reply from the owners that said they took the concerns seriously but acknowledged there may have been a lack of clarity around social distancing and they were looking to nominate a health and safety representative. Immediately after its release, Farrier discussed the article with Jesse Mulligan on RNZ.
