= Lone Oak High School =

Lone Oak High School can refer to more than one educational institution in the United States:

- Lone Oak High School (Kentucky), a now-closed school in Lone Oak, Kentucky (postal address in Paducah)
- Lone Oak High School (Texas), a currently operating school in Lone Oak, Texas
