= Lone Mountain (Elko County, Nevada) =

Mountain in Elko County, Nevada, United States

Coordinates: 41°07′36″N 115°58′35″W

Lone Mountain is a summit in the U.S. state of Nevada. The elevation is 8,760 feet (2,670 m).

Lone Mountain was named for the fact it rises high above other nearby summits.
