= Stay (Hebe Tien song) =

Single by Hebe Tien
- Language: Mandarin
- Released: 20 August 2018
- Genre: Mandopop
- Length: 4:11
- Composer(s): Yu Hsuan Lin (林祐萱)
- Lyricist(s): Hebe Tien
- Producer(s): Sandee Chan

Hebe Tien singles chronology
"Miserable Warmth" (2018)	"Stay" (2018)	"Jasper Night" (2018)

Music video
- "Stay" on YouTube

"Stay" (Chinese: 自己的房間; pinyin: 自己的房間; lit. 'A Room of One's Own') is a song recorded by Taiwanese singer Hebe Tien released on 20 August 2018 under HIM International Music. It is the first song from her Live in Life series. The song marked Tien's last single to be released under HIM.

At the 30th Golden Melody Awards, the song was nominated for Best Single Producer (Sandee Chan).

== Background and recording ==
On 23 July 2018, following a fake Instagram account that garnered 20,000 followers, Tien opened her personal account. In the first photo posted on the account, Tien was holding a carton of French fries against her face, mentioning that the weather is hot and that she just wants to stay in her room, including the hashtag #自己的房間 which is the title of the then undisclosed single and #LiveinLife. Her succeeding posts continued to include the hashtags which served as teasers. According to Tien, the idea of the single came from a recollection of her traveling on a boat with her parents to the scenic town of Wuzhen. While on the boat, it rained heavily and she was mesmerized by the sounds of the water and the beautiful scenery. Tien thought that if she could record the ambient sounds she heard during that time, and lay music and vocals on top, it would always bring back memories of that experience. Tien also recalled the sound of collapsing and melting icebergs while filming the music video for "Insignificance" and thought that if she could have just recorded the sound and turned it into a song, the significance of environmental issues will resonate more with the people.

On 7 August 2018, Tien posted a photo with the words "自己的房間" and "live in life", accompanied by long poetic writing about how her mother's belly was her first room where she sang without the need for a fancy stage, and that music exists even when no one is playing an instrument. A series of short and mundane clips of her brushing her teeth and reading a book while eating was released on her social media. Shortly, it was revealed that Tien will release a live recording single to be produced by singer-songwriter, producer and director Sandee Chan. The concept marked Tien's return to her origins after releasing four studio albums, back to her "own room" where she wrote the lyrics by herself. According to Tien, "the room is the most comfortable and unrestrained place for me. I am very close to my own room," a place where it could be empty but she could introspect. A place where musical ideas are born and vocal exercises are indispensable.

For the single, recording equipment had been set up across multiple floors in a B&B. Not only did they opt for live recording techniques, but employed field recording to capture environmental ambient noises such as cicadas and birds. Since there were nearly 100 people working on the production and musicians were scattered across different rooms in the house, communication was difficult so Tien relied on Chan to handle the recording process. Tien found the recording similar to a concert, noting that different environments stimulate her adrenaline and that imperfections in live recording can be interesting.

== Release ==
On 20 August 2018, Tien held a live broadcast on her Facebook for the first time, attracting 12,000 people in the audience. She talked about the moment when she and her S.H.E bandmate Selina sang their song "Genesis" in the delivery room with their other bandmate Ella, who was giving birth that time. "Stay" was released the same day and the music video for the single was released during the live broadcast.

A twenty-five-minute behind-the-scenes documentary about the song was released on HIM's YouTube account on 19 September 2018.

== Music video ==
The music video was directed by Remii Huang, and was shot in a B&B in Sanzhi, New Taipei. The filming was done during the blue hour, in a multi-camera setup, to capture the perfect atmosphere for the song. The video begins with clips of musicians doing soundchecks and Chan asking Tien over the receiver if she's ready. It was followed by a quote from the book A Room of One's Own by Virginia Woolf. At the start of the song, the music video is edited in split screen where Tien is shown sitting on the bed while singing in front of the mic on the other side while the musicians play their instruments, interchanging with the other musicians, and random footage shot around the house. During the climax of the song, Tien got off the bed and passed by the other rooms with the musicians until she reached the room with the piano and mic, and continued to sing until the end of the video.
