= A Little Happiness (song) =

Single by Hebe Tien

from the album Our Times OST
- Released: July 10, 2015
- Genre: Mandopop
- Length: 4:26
- Label: HIM International Music
- Composer(s): JerryC
- Lyricist(s): Jennifer Hsu; Wu Huei Fu

"A Little Happiness" (Chinese: 小幸運) is a song performed by Taiwanese singer Hebe Tien, released on July 10, 2015. Its lyrics were written by Jennifer Hsu and Wu Huei Fu, whilst production was handled by JerryC. It serves as the theme song for the movie Our Times (2015) and is included as part of the Our Times OST. The song was shortlisted for the Best Song of the Year Award and Best Composer Award at the 27th Golden Melody Awards.

== Background ==
"A Little Happiness" is co-written by Jennifer Hsu and Huei-Fu Wu, composed and arranged by JerryC, with demo sung by Janice Yan and later by Hebe Tien. The song was written by JerryC after reading the script of the movie Our Times twice.

Since the director of the movie Our Times, Yushan Chen, believes that Hebe Tien has a special attribute of being able to straddle the generations of 5th and 6th graders and 18-year olds, he invited Hebe Tien to sing "A Little Happiness", which is the second time for Hebe Tien to collaborate with a movie to sing the theme song after "LOVE!

== Reception ==
The official YouTube music video for "A Little Happiness" has received more than 100 million views, and the song has won the 2015 Hit FM Top 100 Singles of the Year award on Hit FM Network. On May 13, 2016, the song was shortlisted for the Best Song of the Year and Best Composer awards at the 27th Golden Melody Awards, and has been on the KKBOX daily charts for 249 days, and has been on the KKBOX charts for more than 70 weeks so far in 2017.

In October 2015, the song was shortlisted for the Best Original Movie Song at the 52nd Golden Horse Awards, and won the No. 1 spot in the "2015 Hit FM Top 100 Singles" on December 31 of the same year, and was shortlisted for the Best Song of the Year Award at the 27th Golden Melody Awards on May 13, 2016, and JerryC was shortlisted for the Best Songwriter Award with the song.

== Accolades ==
List of awards and nominations
Award	Year	Category	Result	Ref.
Golden Melody Awards	2015	Best Song of the Year	Nominated	
Golden Melody Awards	2015	Best Composer	Nominated	
Golden Horse Awards	2015	Best Original Movie Song	Nominated	
Top Ten Chinese Gold Songs Awards	2016	Outstanding Mandarin Pop Song Award	Won	
Global Pop Music Gold List	2016	Top 20 Golden Songs of the Year	Won	
Global Pop Music Gold List	2016	Best Movie Theme Song of the Year	Won	
MTV Global Chinese Music Awards	2016	Best Ten Golden Songs	Won	
Miguhui Awards	2016	Top 10 Gold Songs of the Year	Won	
