= Lone Rock =

Lone Rock may refer to the following places:

== Canada ==
- Lone Rock, Saskatchewan

== United States ==
- Lone Rock, Iowa
- Lone Rock (Glen Canyon National Recreation Area)
- Lone Rock, Washington
- Lone Rock, Wisconsin, a village
- Lone Rock, Juneau County, Wisconsin, an unincorporated community
