= Loneliness (album) =

Studio album by Evan Yo
- Released: 2009
- Genre: Pop; rock
- Label: Sony Music

Evan Yo chronology
Search Evan Yo (2008)	Loneliness (2009)	0 cm to Yo (2010)

Loneliness is the third Mandarin album by Taiwanese singer Evan Yo (Mandarin pinyin: Tsai Min-you) (蔡旻佑), released on 9 October 2009 by Sony Music Taiwan. The songs are a mixture of pop and rock numbers, including pop rock, punk rock, R&B and ballads genres. Yo worked on the album with four producers and a variety of songwriters and musicians.

The song "打不倒男孩", was the theme song of the UBA Basketball Competition. Yo performed the song live during half-time. Original songs were written by Yo along with "打不倒男孩", written by international songwriters Roxanne Seeman, Robin Grubert, and Ali Zuckowski.

A special limited edition was released with a bonus DVD including five music videos.

== Background ==
Yo spent 6 months, 12 hours a day at the piano writing songs for his third album. In the process, he put his personal feelings into the ten songs he created. The songs ranged from ballad, "Loneliness", to punk-rock "Can't Beat The Boy (打不倒男孩)" and include pop, rock and R&B.

== Track listing ==
No.	Title	Writer(s)	Producer(s)	Length
1.	"发光的简讯"	Daryl Yao; Evan Yo	Yu Chen	4:3
2.	"小乖乖"	Mengwan Zhang; Evan Yo	Yu Chen	3:42
3.	"寂寞好了"	Percy Phang; Mengwan Zhang	Justin	5:42
4.	"爱是对的"	Masa; Zimin Peng	Yu Chen	3:09
5.	"日蚀"	Evan Yo; Zimin Peng	Justin	5:22
6.	"你看不到的天空"	Ronghao Li; Jennifer Hsu; Huifu Wu	Justin	4:40
7.	"Hey!"	Evan Yo	Yu Chen	4:11
8.	"我的宝贝"	Michael Lin; Yixuan Jiang	Michael Lin	3:58
9.	"打不倒男孩"	Roxanne Seeman; Robin Grubert; Ali Zuckowski	Yu Chen	3:26
10.	"走"	Yixin Zhang; Yixuan Jiang	Jamie Hsueh	3:57
Total length:				43:4
