= List of storms named Ione =

The name Ione has been used for five tropical cyclones worldwide: one in the Atlantic Ocean, three the Eastern Pacific Ocean, and one in the Western Pacific Ocean.

In the Atlantic:

- Hurricane Ione (1955) – a Category 4 hurricane that made landfall in North Carolina, the third hurricane to hit the state in less than two months

Ione was retired in the Atlantic after the 1955 season.

In the Eastern Pacific:

- Tropical Storm Ione (1966) – did not cause any damages or fatalities
- Tropical Storm Ione 1 (1970) – operationally considered the same storm as Tropical Storm Ione 2
- Tropical Storm Ione 2 (1970) – operationally considered the same storm as Tropical Storm Ione 1
- Hurricane Ione (1974) – a Category 3 hurricane that was one of five simultaneously active tropical cyclones in the basin

In the Western Pacific:

- Typhoon Ione (1948) (T4821) – made landfall in Japan, killing 512 people

== See also ==
Storms with similar names

- Hurricane Hone (2024) – a Central Pacific hurricane
- Cyclone Io (1977) – a South-West Indian Ocean intense tropical cyclone
- Hurricane Ioke (2006) – another Central Pacific hurricane
- Hurricane Iona (2025) – another Central Pacific hurricane
- Tropical Storm Iune (2015) – a Central Pacific tropical storm
