= Lone Fight =

Lone Fight is a broad family name related exclusively to the Mandan, Hidatsa, and Arikara Nation of the Fort Berthold Reservation in North Dakota.

Notable Lone Fights include:

- Edward Lone Fight, (1940–2025), chairman of the Three Affiliated Tribes and Native American compensation activist
- Darren Edward Lone Fight, (b. 1981), Professor of American Studies at Dickinson College. Founding Executive Director, Center for the Futures of Native Peoples

== See also ==
- Lone Fighter, a 1923 American silent western film
