= Evan Yo =

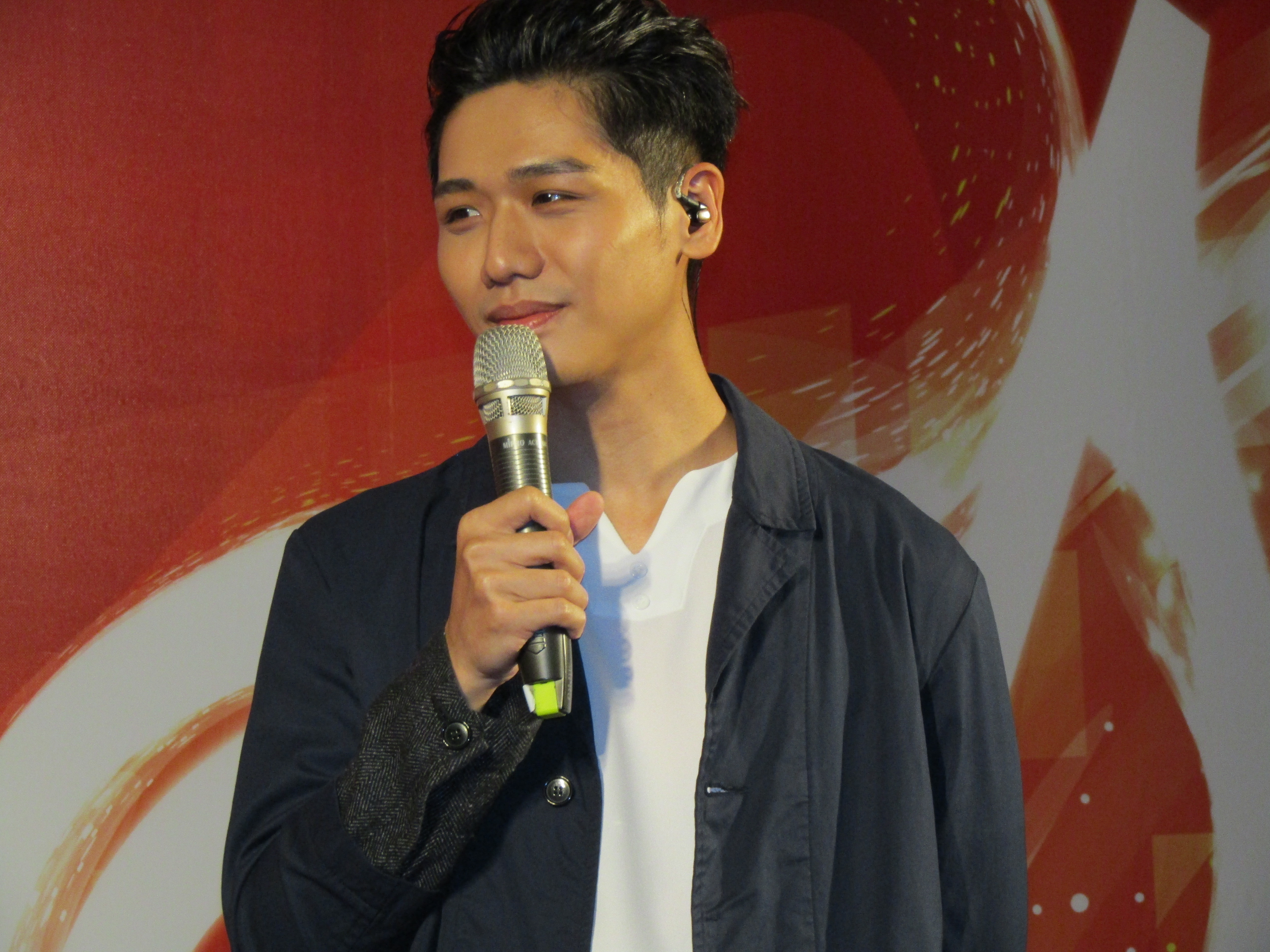
- Yo at Huashan Creative Park in November 2017.
- Born: 12 November 1986 (age 39); Taipei, Taiwan
- Occupations: Singer; actor; songwriter
- Years active: 2006–present
- Musical career
- Genres: Mandopop
- Instruments: Vocals, Violin, Piano, Guitar, Drum, Dizi
- Label: Pourquoi Pas Music (current) ICHI Entertainment 2014–present
- Website: http://ichi-ent.com/zh/artist/about/3 Evan Yo@Sony Music Taiwan

Tsai Min-you (born 12 November 1986), better known as Evan Yo, is a Taiwanese Mandopop singer-songwriter. He was signed by his management company at 14 and has been signed by Sony Music Taiwan since 2006. He has released four albums and was nominated for Best New Artist in 2007 at the 18th Golden Melody Awards, Taiwan.

Tsai graduated from the Music Department of National Taiwan Normal University. He majored in the violin.

== Filmography ==
=== Television series ===
Year	Title	Role	Network	Notes	Ref.
2007	Kendo Love 劍道愛				
2013	Fabulous Boys	Jeremy	FTV, GTV	Main, 3rd Male Lead; Second Vocalist & Drummer	
2013	Kiss Me, Mom!	Ke Jing Yun	CTV, TVBS	Ke Family	
2014	Fall in Love With Me	Tao Le Yuan	TTV	Supporting Cast	
2014	Mischievous Kiss 2: Love in Okinawa	Jeremy, A.N. Jell	Fuji TV	Guest, Episode 1	

=== Commercials ===
- (2004) La New Freshmen Air Shoes
- (2006) KFC French Salmon Roll
- (2008) "A Sa Mu" Milk Tea

== Discography ==
=== Studio albums ===
Album	Details	Tracks	Ref.
1st	19 (首張創作專輯19): Released: 6 October 2006; Label: Sony Music Taiwan	1. "Intro; 2. "夢不落帝國" (Neverland); 3. "Can You Hear Me"; 4. "城外" (Outside the Walled City); 5. "超人不在家" (Superman is Not at Home); 6. "我可以" (I Can); 7. "旋轉門" (Revolving door); 8. "簡單" (Easy); 9. "熱氣球" (Hot-Air Balloon); 10. "翻不完的夏天" (Never-Ending Summer); 11. "我想要說" (I Want to Say); 12. "8 Bit"	
2nd	Search Evan Yo (搜尋蔡旻佑): Released: 11 July 2008; Label: Sony Music Taiwan	1. 我回來了 (I'm Back); 2. 阿姆斯壯 (Armstrong/I'm Strong); 3. Stay With Me; 4. 希區考克 作品152 (Hitchcock No. 152); 5. The Love I Know; 6. 沒有人要的孩子 (The Abandoned Child); 7. 老地方 (In The Same Place); 8. 我用一首DEMO跟你告白XD (I Tell You I Love You with a Demo lol); 9. 2人 (Two of Us); 10. 台北21度C (Taipei 21 °C); 11. 愛? (Love?)	
3rd	Loneliness (寂寞，好了): Released: 9 October 2009; Label: Sony Music Taiwan	1. 发光的简讯; 2. 小乖乖; 3. 寂寞,好了; 4. 爱是对的; 5. 日蚀; 6. 你看不到的天空; 7. Hey !; 8. 我的宝贝; 9. 打不倒男孩; 10. 走	
4th	Super Yo (超級右腦): Released: 5 October 2012; Label: Universal Music	1. 超级右脑 (Super Right Brain); 2. 想 (Want); 3. 怎么爱你都不够 (However I Love You It Isn't Enough); 4. 女大田力小 Ft. 天心 (Small Female Daejeon Force); 5. 爱的自由式 (Freestyle Love); 6. 光 (Light); 7. 情瓜 (Love Melons); 8. 谁知道 (Who Knows); 9. 暖身幸福 (Warm-up Happiness); 10. 强心脏 (Strong Heart)	

=== Soundtrack Contributions ===
Year	Album Information	Tracks Contributed	Ref.
2007	Corner * With Love Original Soundtrack (轉角*遇到愛 電視原聲帶): Released: 19 January 2007; Label: Sony Music Taiwan	"我想要說" (I Want To Say); "我可以" (I Can); "Can You Hear Me"	
2013	Fabulous Boys Original Soundtrack (原來是美男 電視原聲帶): Released: 4 June 2013; Label: Warner Music Taiwan	"好不好" (Be With Me); "最安靜的話" (Most Quiet Words)	

== Awards and nominations ==
Year	Award	Category	Notable Works	Result	Ref.
2006	HITO Radio Music Awards	Hito Top 100 Singles	I Can	#62	
2007	KKBOX Digital Music Awards	Popular Media Request Single	I Can	Won	
2007	HITO Radio Music Awards	Most Popular New Artist	Himself	Won	
2007	18th Golden Melody Awards	Nominated Best New Artist	Himself	Won	
2007	13th Singapore Hit Awards	Best Newcomer	Himself	Won	
