= Lonely Is the Night (disambiguation) =

"Lonely Is the Night" is a 1981 song by Billy Squier.

Lonely Is the Night may also refer to:

- "Lonely Is the Night" (Air Supply song), 1986 song by Air Supply
- Lonely Is the Night, 1990 album by Lory Bianco

== See also ==
- Lonely Nights (disambiguation)
