= Deca Joins =

Taiwanese rock band

deca joins
- Also known as: FUBAR, Gray Dwarf Star (灰矮星)
- Origin: Taipei, Taiwan
- Genres: Indie rock; alternative
- Years active: 2013–present
- Label: Airhead Records (空氣腦唱片)
- Members: Zheng Jingru (鄭敬儒); Yang Shanghua (楊尚樺); Xie Junyan (謝俊彥); Chen Huanggu (陳皇谷)
- Past members: Lu Haozhao (陸浩釗); Wu Minzhe (吳旻哲); Chen Sitan (沈思坦)
- Website: www.decajoins.com

Deca Joins (stylized as deca joins) is a Taiwanese indie rock band that formed in 2013 in Taipei. The band currently consists of four members: Zheng Jingru (vocals, guitar), Yang Shanghua (guitar), Xie Junyan (bass), and Chen Huanggu (drums). Their music has been described by critics as "indie," "grunge," and "lo-fi."

The band's original name was FUBAR (an acronym of Fucked Up Beyond All Repair), but in 2016, they changed their name to Gray Dwarf Star (灰矮星), and in 2017, they switched to their current name of Deca Joins.

== History ==
=== FUBAR (2013-15) ===
In May 2013, Zheng Jingru and a few other students at the Taipei National University of the Arts formed a rock band named FUBAR. The name "FUBAR" stands for "Fucked Up Beyond All Repair."

In April 2014, FUBAR released their first album, entitled Lu Qiang (盧強). However, the band was put on pause later that year, when the lead singer Zheng Jingru enlisted in Taiwan's mandatory military service.

=== Grey Dwarf Star (2016-17) ===
In January 2016, Zheng Jingru was discharged from military service, and the band re-formed under the new name Gray Dwarf Star (灰矮星). In October 2016, the band released their single "Fashan Chen" (乏善可陳).

=== Deca Joins (2017-present) ===
In January 2017, the band changed their name again to the current "Deca Joins," which is a combination of the English words "decadent" and "decaffeination". In April 2017, Deca Joins released the album Bathroom (浴室), which drew wide acclaim in both Taiwan and internationally. The band went on tour to promote the album in Taiwan and Mainland China.

In November 2018, they released the album Go Slow, and went on another tour to promote the album. The popular single from this album, "Wave" (海浪), has received over 1.5 million views on YouTube. In 2019, the music video for the song "Go Slow" was nominated for the Golden Melody Award for Best Music Video.

In October 2019, the band released the single "When Fog Dissipates" (霧散去的時候). They began their tour "In Between Mountains" to promote the single in Asia, Australia, and the United States, but their tour was cancelled midway through due to the COVID-19 pandemic.

In December 2020, Deca Joins released an album called Bird and Reflections (鳥鳥鳥), for which the band was nominated for the Golden Melody Award for best band. In 2023, the band has since started embarked on another tour called "Reverie's Edge."

In July 2025, Deca Joins released their single "偏見".

In March 2026, the band released their third album A Brief Stop (在這裡停一下), which has been six year since their last full album release. They also start the 2026 tour "A Brief Stop" from May to October 2026 visiting Asia, and North America.

== Members ==
=== Current members ===
- Zheng Jingru (鄭敬儒) - vocals and guitar
- Yang Shanghua (楊尚樺) - guitar
- Xie Junyan (謝俊彥) - bass
- Chen Huanggu (陳皇谷) - drums

=== Past members ===
- Lu Haozhao (陸浩釗)
- Wu Minzhe (吳旻哲)
- Chen Sitan (沈思坦)

== Discography ==
=== Singles and EPs ===
Year	Album name	Song name
2023	暗流	1. 我和我的遐想; 2. 暗流; 3. 天堂與泥土; 4. 沉澱
2023	deca joins on Audiotree Live	1. Fog (霧) - Audiotree Live version 2. Fa Shan Ke Chen (乏善可陳) - Audiotree Live version 3. Dream (夢) - Audiotree Live version 4. Wave (海浪) - Audiotree Live version
2020	3 Songs (Live)	1. 乏善可陳; 2. 夏夜晚風; 3. 艷紅
2019	When Fog Dissipates (霧散去的時候)	1. Fog (霧); 2. When It Dissipates (散去的時候)
2018	Go Slow	1. Somewhere; 2. Wave (海浪); 3. In Eyes (眼睛裡); 4. Nighttime Monologue (夜間獨白); 5. Go Slow

=== Albums ===
Year	Album name	Song name
2026	A Brief Stop (在這裡停一下)	1. 我不用問; 2. 泥土; 3. 喜相逢; 4. 地圖; 5. 漫長的人生; 6. Gabi's Stove; 7. 萬有引力; 8. 絕對的平衡; 9. 失敗的晚餐; 10. 金龍隧道; 11. 滿月; 12. 坐過站; 13. 在這裡停一下
2020	Bird and Reflections (鳥鳥鳥)	1. Intro; 2. 漫漫長夜; 3. 黑暗之中閉上眼; 4. 霧 5. B1; 6. 臥室; 7. 散去的時候; 8. 多完美一天; 9. 午夜的消亡; 10. Outro
2017	Bathroom (浴室)	1. Never Coming Back (一去不回來); 2. Happiness (快樂); 3. Woodude (巫堵); 4. Guandu Port (關渡口); 5. Blue (藍色); 6. Swimming in Spring (春天游泳); 7. Road (路); 8. Bathroom (浴室); 9. Dream (夢)
