= Lonely Nights (disambiguation) =

"Lonely Nights" is a song by Mickey Gilley.

Lonely Nights may also refer to:

== Songs ==
- "Lonely Nights", by Bryan Adams from the album You Want It You Got It
- "Lonely Nights", by Scorpions from the album Face the Heat
- "Lonely Nights", by White Lion from the album Pride
- "Lonely Nights", by The Kentucky Headhunters from the album Soul
- “Lonely Nights”, by LEISURE from the album Sunsetter

== See also ==
- Lonely Night (disambiguation)
- Lonely Is the Night (disambiguation)
