= Lonely Night (disambiguation) =

"Lonely Night (Angel Face)" is a 1976 song by Captain & Tennille.

Lonely Night may also refer to:

- "Lonely Night", a single from Vigilante by the British group Magnum
- "Lonely Night", a 2016 song by Korean rapper Gary featuring Gaeko
- "The Lonely Night", a 2013 song by Moby and Mark Lanegan, featured on Moby's Innocents
- "Lonely Night" (Alma song), a 2019 single

== See also ==
- Lonely Nights (disambiguation)
