= Dongyanshan Forest Recreation Area =

Forest in Rein'ai, Nantou County, Taiwan

Dongyanshan Forest Recreation Area Chinese: 東眼山國家森林遊樂區
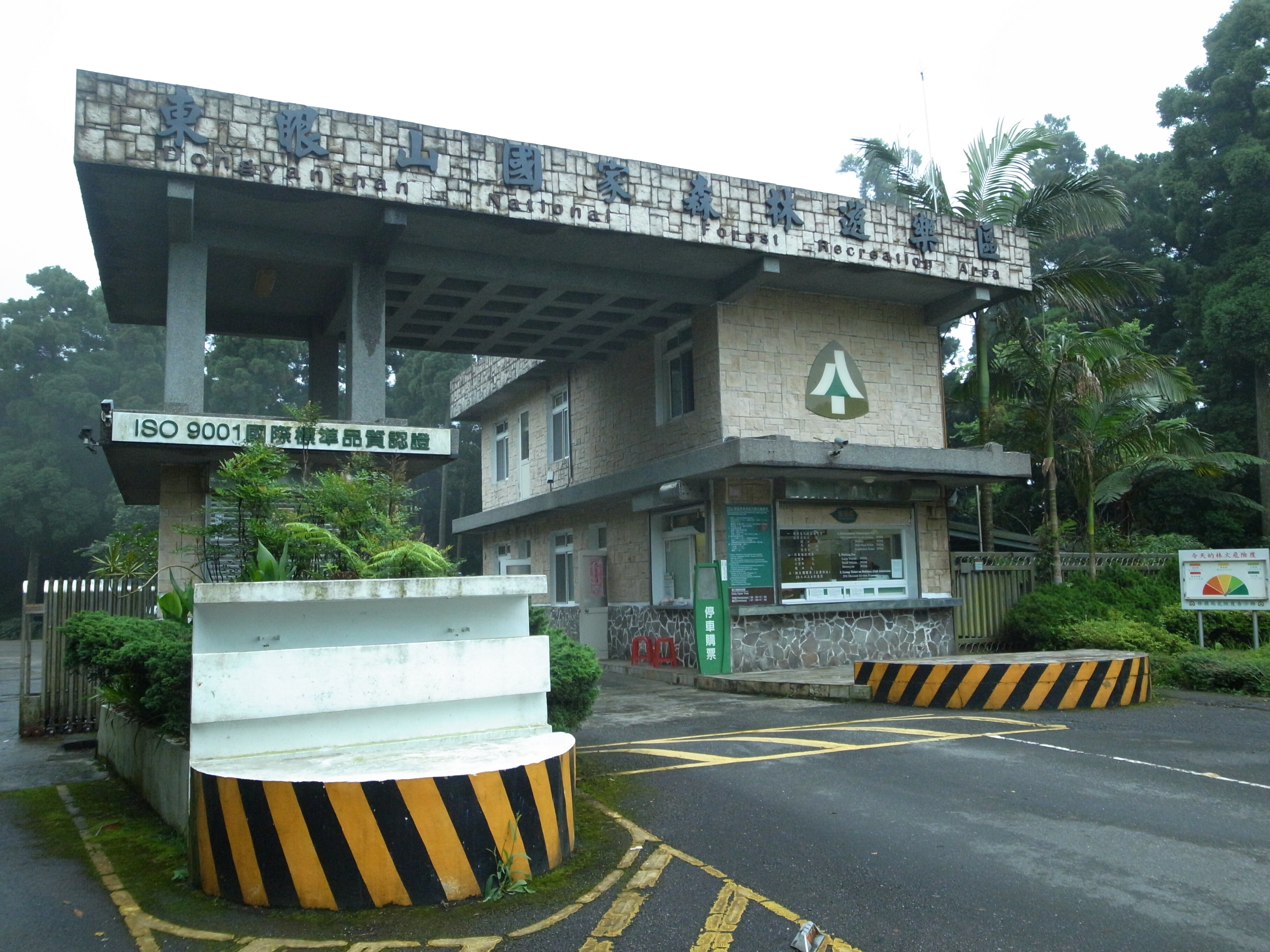

- Location within Taiwan
- Interactive map of Dongyanshan Forest Recreation Area

Geography
- Location: Fuxing, Taoyuan City, Taiwan
- Coordinates: 24°49′30.3″N 121°25′03.5″E
- Elevation: 650–1,212 m (2,133–3,976 ft)
- Area: 916 ha (2,260 acres)

Dongyanshan Forest Recreation Area (traditional Chinese: 東眼山國家森林遊樂區; simplified Chinese: 东眼山国家森林游乐区; pinyin: Dōngyǎn Shān Guójiā Sēnlín Yóulè Qū) is a forest located in Fuxing District, Taoyuan City, Taiwan.

== History ==
The forest used to be the logging storage area for the Forestry and Nature Conservation Agency.

== Geology ==
The forest spans over an area of 916 hectares and located at an altitude of 650–1,212 meters above sea level. It is also home to 43 species of mountain birds and mammals. It features trekking paths with information boards.

== See also ==
- Geography of Taiwan
