= Hebe Tien =

Taiwanese singer & actress (born 1983)

- 田馥甄
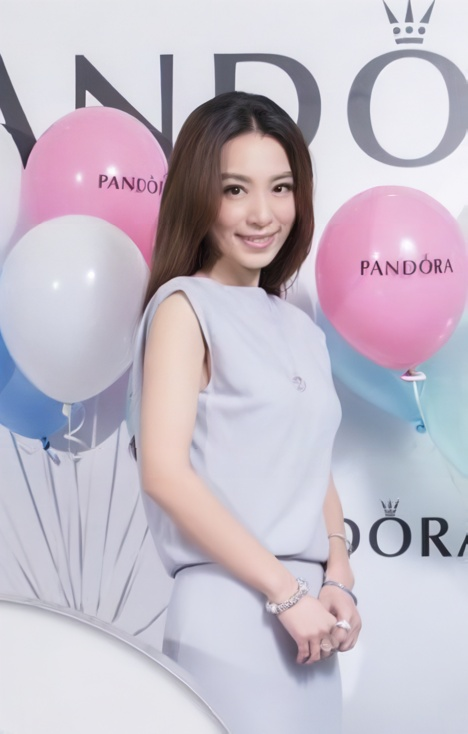
- Tien in 2017
- Born: Tien Fu-chen; 30 March 1983 (age 43); Xinfeng, Hsinchu County, Taiwan
- Education: Hu Kou High School of Hsinchu
- Occupations: Singer; actress
- Years active: 2001–present
- Organization: A Tune Music
- Musical career
- Genre: Mandopop
- Instruments: Vocals; piano; ukulele
- Labels: HIM (2000–2018); Pourquoi Pas (2018–present)
- Member of: S.H.E

Chinese name
- Chinese: 田馥甄
Transcriptions
Standard Mandarin
- Hanyu Pinyin: Tián Fùzhēn
- Wade–Giles: T'ien^{2} Fu^{4}-chen^{1}
- IPA: [tʰjɛ̌n fû.ʈʂə́n]
Southern Min
- Tâi-lô: Tiân Hok-tsin

Hebe Tien Fu-chen (Chinese: 田馥甄; pinyin: Tián Fùzhēn; born 30 March 1983) is a Taiwanese singer and actress. She rose to fame in the early 2000s as a member of Taiwanese girl group S.H.E. The release of her debut album, To Hebe (2010), established her as a solo artist. Tien's song "A Little Happiness", the theme song of the 2015 Taiwanese film Our Times, was a major hit in most Mandarin-speaking parts of Asia.

== Early life ==
Tien Fuchen was born in Xinfeng, Hsinchu, Taiwan on 30 March 1983. Her father is a civil servant, her mother is a housewife, and her older brother used to own an American-Mexican restaurant in Zhubei. She is of Hakka descent. She graduated from Hukou High School in Hsinchu. Tien once said that if she had not been a singer, she would have been a civil servant like her father after university. In 1999, at age sixteen, Tien made her debut on television by participating in the 'Ridiculous Beauty' segment of the CTV variety show Guess where she played flute and another show TV Citizen where she showcased her singing talent and won 10,000 NTD.

== Career ==
=== 2000: S.H.E ===
Shortly after Tien's appearance on the show TV Citizen, the production team invited her to participate on the show again and was scouted by Grand Music International (currently HIM International Music) for an audition. On 8 August 2000, HIM International Music held the "Universal 2000 Talent and Beauty Girl Contest" in search of new artists to be signed onto their label. The staff of the TV show "Cruel Stage" encouraged Tien to participate in this televised competition. The contest had about 1,000 contestants, and after several rounds of competition, seven contestants remained for the final round. In the first round, Tien's voice began to crack while singing "Return Home". As a result, she decided to sing in a lower key in the final round, choosing Singaporean singer Kit Chan's "Loving You". However, she was unfamiliar with the song so about ten seconds of the final lyrics went unsung. Following the competition, the Taiwanese record company gave all seven contestants an audition. The show's manager appreciated her straightforward personality and powerful vocals. As a result, Tien was invited to become a member of S.H.E, with Selina and Ella, and was signed under the Taiwanese record label HIM International Music.

=== 2010–2012: To Hebe and My Love ===
Following a very successful career with S.H.E, Tien debuted as a solo music artist in 2010. In September, she received critical acclaim for her debut album To Hebe. In May 2011, the album was nominated for four awards in the 22nd Golden Melody Awards. It won Best Music Video for "Leave Me Alone" and Best Single Producer for "LOVE!". The album was also selected for the Top Ten Albums by the Association of Music Workers in Taiwan and her song "LOVE!" was chosen for the Top Ten Singles.

In September 2011, Tien launched her second album My Love. The album's song "Still in Happiness" reached 10 million views on YouTube, making Tien the first Chinese-language female singer whose music video garnered 10 million views. On 21 January 2013, "Leave Me Alone" from her first album also reached 10 million views on YouTube, making Tien the first Chinese-language singer who have 2 music videos with more than 10 million views on the platform. In May 2012, My Love is the most nominated work at the 23rd Golden Melody Awards, receiving a total of seven nominations including Golden Melody Award for Best Mandarin Album and Best Music Video for her song "My Love".

=== 2013–2017: Insignificance, world tour and Day By Day ===
Insignificance was released on 29 November 2013, following the music video of her same-titled single a few weeks prior. The music video reached one million views on YouTube within four days and the album sold 40,000 copies in Taiwan within a week. Tien became the female singer with the highest selling album for that year. In May 2014, the album was nominated for two awards at the 25th Golden Melody Awards including Best Music Video. She performed three songs by Taiwanese singer Tracy Huang during the awards ceremony. By the end of the year, Tien embarked on her first solo world tour "IF" which kicked off on 6 December 2014 at Taipei Arena. Tickets for the two-day concert in Taipei sold out within 10 minutes.

In July 2015, she sang "A Little Happiness" for the Taiwanese film Our Times which made her the first Chinese-language singer with more than 100 million views on YouTube, and the second Asian female singer with 100 million views. In September, she released "Pretty Woman" as part of the soundtrack for the Chinese film Go Lala Go 2. In the same year, "Learning From Drunk" and "Insignificance" from her third album received more than 10 million views on YouTube.

On 5 March 2016, Tien wrapped up the first leg of the "IF" world tour at the Singapore Indoor Stadium. At the 27th Golden Melody Awards, "A Little Happiness" was nominated for Song of the Year and Best Composer (Composer: JerryC, lyrics by Xu Shi Zhen & Wu Hui Fa.) The second leg of her world tour titled "IF Plus" kicked off at the Hong Kong Coliseum on 17 June, where she first performed her songs "When you are gone" and "Every day is a Miracle". Both songs appeared on her fourth album Day by Day which was released a month after. Towards the end of the year, Tien participated as a celebrity tutor alongside JJ Lin, A-Mei, Jam Hsiao and Yu Quan in the first season of the Chinese music program Sound of My Dream. Her live performances were released digitally.

In February 2017, Tien performed the Chinese theme song for the film Beauty and the Beast with Chinese singer Jing Boran. At the 28th Golden Melody Awards, her album Day By Day was nominated for two awards including Best Music Video for her song "Love Yourself". Tien wrapped up her world tour "IF Plus" on 2 September 2017 after adding two additional dates held at Kaohsiung Arena with a total of 38 concerts spanning in 23 cities.

=== 2018–2023: Departure from HIM and Time Will Tell ===
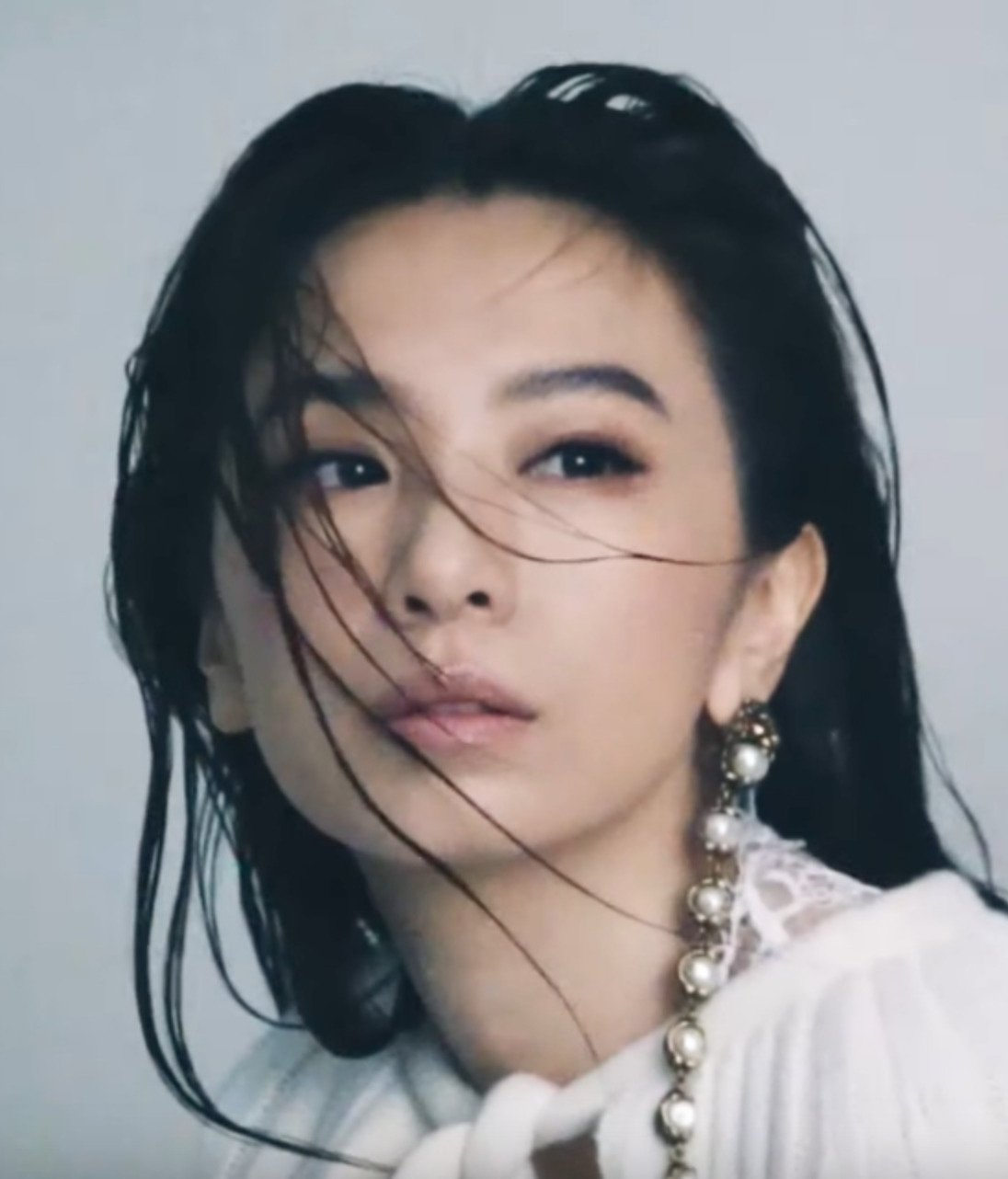
Tien in 2019

On 20 August 2018, Tien released her self-composed live recorded song "Stay" as part of Live in Life series to capture her current emotions. The song which was produced by Sandee Chan was eventually nominated for Producer of the Year, Single at the 30th Golden Melody Awards. In the same month, S.H.E released their final single with their record label HIM International Music titled "Seventeen" written by Sodagreen vocalist, Greeny Wu to commemorate the group's 17th anniversary since debut. It was followed by a free open-air concert held at the Liberty Square in Taipei which was fully booked in a minute with a total of 12,000 attendees. By September 2018, Tien along with the other S.H.E members officially left HIM International Music after 17 years and founded her own management company, A TUNE Music (樂来樂好), and released her first single outside HIM, "Jasper Night" as soundtrack to the Chinese film Long Day's Journey into Night in December of that year.

In April 2019, Tien signed a recording deal with Pourquoi Pas Music (PQPMusic; 何樂音樂) and will be working in cooperation with her management company. She announced that her fifth studio album and second concert world tour will be in preparation, and released her first single with her new record label, "Still Early" as soundtrack to the Chinese film Midnight Diner in September.

Tien's fifth studio album, Time Will Tell was released in September, and she performed for four nights at her sold-out second concert tour One, After Another at the Taipei Arena. She was the second artist next to Eric Chou to hold a concert tour in Taiwan since the COVID-19 pandemic started. By the following month, she was invited as a guest and performed her songs "Anything Goes", "You Should Know About It" from her new album and "Learning From Drunk" at the 31st Golden Melody Awards.

At the 32nd Golden Melody Awards, her fifth studio album, Time Will Tell was nominated for 6 awards including Best Album in Mandarin, Music Video of the Year for the song "One, After Another" and Best Female Mandarin Singer. Tien won the Golden Melody Award for Best Female Mandarin Singer for the album. She also won several awards at the 18th Hito Music Awards for the same album, including Best Female Singer, Global Media Commendation Award, Top Ten Chinese Songs of the Year, 2020 Top 100 Singles, and the single "A Song For You" won the Best Composer award.

On 24 February 2022, Tien held a press conference announcing the release of her new song "It is The Hour" as part of the LIVE IN LIFE series she started back in 2018 and released the music video the day after. She also announced the continuation of her concert tour One, After Another to be held at Kaohsiung Arena in May. 40,000 tickets sold out within seconds. On 25 April, It was announced that the tour dates will be rescheduled to September due to the increasing local transmissions of the COVID-19 pandemic. On 10 June 2022, Tien released the music video for her song "One Week Friends" as the official soundtrack to the Chinese film of the same name, adapted from the Japanese manga series One Week Friends.

From 5 to 13 August 2023, Tien held the final dates of her One, After Another concert where she reunited with S.H.E members and premiered her new single, "Glimpses of a Journey", which was then released on 18 August 2023.

=== 2025–present: Live in Life tour and The Land of Maybe ===
On 16 January 2025, Tien announced that she is planning to have a small-scale concert and on 30 March, it is confirmed that she will embark on the Field Survey: Live in Life Tour from May to June. It featured ten stops across five outdoor venues from different cities and is lottery-based, with only 20,000 tickets available in total. As part of the tour's promotion, she released her single, "On Three", at midnight on 18 April, and released a music video featuring a montage of the tour after it concluded. On 17 May, the tour kicked off at the Jingzaijiao Tile-paved Salt Fields in Tainan, followed by subsequent tour stops at H-Xiao Mountain Mist in Puli, Nantou, Weiwuying National Arts and Culture Center Outdoor Theater in Kaohsiung, Hengchun Lianfu Brick Kiln in Pingtung, and concluded at the National Chi Nan University in Puli, Nantou.

At the 36th Golden Melody Awards on 27 June 2026, she performed a medley of Yuan Wei-jen songs as part of the program's "Remembering Deceased Musicians".

On 24 September, Tien's sixth studio album, The Land of Maybe was released.

=== YouTube views ===
Tien's music videos are among the most-viewed and have accumulated more than 658 million views on YouTube, and is the Chinese-language female singer with the most views on the platform. Tien's 2015 music video "A Little Happiness" became the first Chinese-language music video to exceed 100 million views on YouTube the following year. She was the second female singer in Asia to reach 100 million views on YouTube.

== Discography ==
=== Studio albums ===
- To Hebe (2010)
- My Love (2011)
- Insignificance (渺小; 2013)
- Day by Day (日常; 2016)
- Time Will Tell (無人知曉; 2020)
- The Land of Maybe (要去什麼地方; 2026)

=== Live recording series ===
- Live in Life - #1 Stay (2018)
- Live in Life - #2 It is the Hour (2022)

=== Singles ===
- 熱情 ("Passion") – Commercial single for Whisper sanitary pad in China
- 小幸運 ("A Little Happiness") – Theme song for the film Our Times
- 姐 ("Pretty Woman") – OST for the film Go Lala Go 2
- 看淡 ("As It Is") – Theme song for the television series A Touch of Green
- 美女與野獸 ("Beauty and the Beast") – Chinese theme song for the film Beauty and the Beast, featuring Jing Boran
- 愛了很久的朋友 ("Ai Le Hen Jiu De Peng You") – OST for the film Us and Them
- 最暖的憂傷 ("Miserable Warmth") – Theme song for the television series Here to Heart
- 自己的房間 ("Stay") – First live recorded song of Hebe's new 「Live in Life」 live recording series
- 墨綠的夜 ("Jasper Night") – Theme song for the film Long Day's Journey into Night
- 不晚 ("Still Early") – Theme song for the film Midnight Diner (2019)
- 一周的朋友 ("One Week Friends") – Theme song for the film One Week Friends (2022)
- 乘著無人光影的遠行 ("Glimpses of a Journey") – YouTube Official MV on 22 August 2023
- Live in Life - #3 On Three (2025)

=== Tours ===
- Love! To Hebe Tour (2010–2011)
- To My Love Tour (2011–2012)
- Insignificance Tour (2013–2014)
- IF World Tour (2014–2017)
- One After Another Tour (2020–2023)
- Live in Life Tour in Taiwan (May 17, 2025 – July 6, 2025)

== Filmography ==
=== Television series ===
Year	English title	Original title	Role
2002	Magical Love	愛情大魔咒	Hu Sha Sha (胡莎莎)
2003	The Rose	薔薇之戀	Xiao Feng (曉楓) (Episode 18–20)
2004	Happy New Year 2004	新年快樂2004	Hebe
2004	Say Yes Enterprise	求婚事務所	Lin An An (林安安) (Episode 1–4)
2005	Reaching for the Stars	真命天女	Shun Xiao Rou (沈孝柔) / Zhou Xiao Nuo (周曉諾)
2007	Bull Fighting (TV series)	鬥牛，要不要	Yi Sheng Xue (伊勝雪)

=== Television shows ===
Year	English title	Original title	Role
2016	Sound of My Dream	夢想的聲音	Judge

== Awards and nominations ==
Year	Event	Award	Work	Result	Ref.
2007	Sprite Music Awards	Best Duet Song (Taiwan)	"Only Have Feelings for You"	Won	
2007	Global Chinese Music Awards	Top 20 Songs of the Year	"Only Have Feelings for You"	Nominated	
2007	Global Chinese Music Awards	Best Female Artist	"Only Have Feelings for You"	Nominated	
2007	KKBOX Awards	Top 20 Songs of the Year	"Only Have Feelings for You"	Won^{[NR]}	
2007	Metro Radio Mandarin Music Awards	Most Popular Karaoke Songs	"Only Have Feelings for You"	Won	
2007	Metro Radio Mandarin Music Awards	Top Songs of the Year	"Only Have Feelings for You"	Nominated	
2011	22nd Golden Melody Awards	Best Mandarin Album	To Hebe	Nominated	
2011	Singapore Entertainment Awards	Best Album & female singer		Won	
2016	KKBOX Music Awards	Top 10 Artists of the Year	Hebe Tien	Won	
2021	32nd Golden Melody Awards	Best Mandarin Female Singer	Time Will Tell	Won	
2021	Hito Music Awards	Best Female Singer	Time Will Tell	Won	
