= Lone Tree Creek (Colorado) =

Physical characteristics
- Source
  - coordinates: 41°08′24″N 105°22′57″W
- Mouth
  - location: Confluence with the South Platte
  - coordinates: 40°25′27″N 104°35′19″W
  - elevation: 4,590 ft (1,400 m)

Basin features
- Progression: South Platte—Platte— Missouri—Mississippi

Lone Tree Creek is a 102-mile-long (164 km) tributary that joins the South Platte River in Weld County, Colorado east of Greeley. The creek's source is west of Buford in Albany County, Wyoming.

== See also ==
- List of rivers of Colorado
- List of rivers of Wyoming
