= JerryC =

Taiwanese guitarist and composer

- Born: 31 August 1981 (age 45); Hualien City, Taiwan
- Occupations: Musician, composer, music producer
- Years active: 2005–present

Chinese name
- Traditional Chinese: 張逸帆
- Simplified Chinese: 张逸帆
Transcriptions
Standard Mandarin
- Hanyu Pinyin: Zhāng Yìfān
- Musical career
- Also known as: Jerry Chang
- Genres: C-rock; Neo-classical metal Alternative rock
- Instruments: Guitar, Piano
- Label: HIM International Music (2006–present)

JerryC (Chinese: 張逸帆; pinyin: Zhāng Yìfān; born 31 August 1981), also known by his English name Jerry Chang, is a Taiwanese guitarist, music producer and composer. He first gained international recognition for "Canon Rock", a viral rock arrangement of Pachelbel's Canon in D.

Following his internet fame, Chang established a successful career in the Mandopop industry as a composer and producer. He is noted for composing major hit songs such as "A Little Happiness" (from Our Times) and "Red Scarf" (from Till We Meet Again). His work has earned him nominations for Best Composer and Best Original Film Song at the Golden Melody Awards and Golden Horse Awards.

He began playing the guitar at the age of 17, and the piano before age 15. His style is influenced by classical music, neoclassical guitarists, as well as metal bands such as Helloween and Metallica and Japanese rock bands such as B'z and L'Arc-en-Ciel.

== Canon Rock ==
His most famous work, "Canon Rock", was made popular only after South Korean guitarist Lim Jeong-hyun, also known as funtwo, performed a cover version in 2005. The song has garnered much media attention; both renditions have been featured on newspapers such as The New York Times, blogs, television shows and radios worldwide.

Chang was featured in the profiles section of the January 2007 issue of Guitar World magazine, along with a tab transcription of "Canon Rock" in the featured songs sections.

At the height of its popularity, "Canon Rock" was one of the top 10 downloaded guitar tabs on the Ultimate Guitar Archive, and was once one of the most viewed videos on YouTube. There are thousands of Canon Rock covers currently on YouTube.

After going viral, Chang signed a recording contract with Taiwanese label HIM International Music. Although no official announcement was made by HIM, the company created a website for Chang in 2007. In a letter to his listeners several months later, he publicly announced that he has indeed signed a contract and has been working with fellow musician Tank. He released an EP, Canon Rock, with the tracks "Canon Rock", "Dear Mozart", "Canon Rock (backing track)", and "Dear Mozart (backing track)".

== Music career ==
Beyond his internet fame, Chang has become a successful composer and producer in the Taiwanese music industry. In 2013, he was nominated for Best Composition at the 24th Golden Melody Awards for the song "Captain S.V" (performed by Yoga Lin). He later garnered significant acclaim for composing the theme song "A Little Happiness" for the film Our Times. This work earned him a nomination for Best Original Film Song at the 52nd Golden Horse Awards in 2015, and a nomination for Best Composition at the 27th Golden Melody Awards in 2016.

In 2021, he received another nomination for Best Original Film Song at the 58th Golden Horse Awards for co-composing "Red Scarf", the theme song for the blockbuster film Till We Meet Again, with WeiBird.

== Awards and nominations ==
Year	Award	Category	Nominated work	Result	Ref.
2013	24th Golden Melody Awards	Best Composition	"Captain S.V" (performed by Yoga Lin)	Nominated	
2015	52nd Golden Horse Awards	Best Original Film Song	"A Little Happiness"	Nominated	
2016	27th Golden Melody Awards	Best Composition	"A Little Happiness"	Nominated	
2021	58th Golden Horse Awards	Best Original Film Song	"Red Scarf"	Nominated	
