= Pourquoi Pas Music =

Taiwanese record label company

Pourquoi Pas Music Limited
- Native name: 何樂音樂有限公司
- Company type: Private
- Industry: Entertainment
- Founded: 2018
- Headquarters: Taipei, Taiwan
- Area served: Taiwan
- Services: Record label
- Website: pqpmusic.com

Pourquoi Pas (Note: French: Why not) Music (Chinese: 何樂音樂) is a Taiwanese record label established in 2018. The main operating mode is mainly through cooperation with artistes such as release of records and records management. Pourquoi Pas Music works with Diversity Music (Chinese: 容合音樂) for the digital record release and management in mainland China.

== Artists ==
Pourquoi Pas Music works with 19 artists/groups currently (as of August 19, 2023).

Name	Status
Wen-Chiang Liao (廖文強)	Singer
Hebe Tien	Singer
Kay Liu (劉家凱)	Singer
Emerson Tsai	Actor, Singer
Jasper Liu	Actor, Singer
Sandee Chan	Singer
Pei-Yu Hung (洪佩瑜)	Singer
Wanfang	Singer
Henry Hsu	Singer
icyball (icyball冰球樂團)	Group
Bestards	Group

Pourquoi Pas Music works with 2 artist management agencies too.

ICHI Entertainment

- Evan Yo (蔡旻佑)
- Greg Hsu (許光漢)
- Yoshua Tsai (阿膽)

forgood music

- Waa Wei (魏如萱)
- Kowen Ko (柯智棠)
- Lumi Hsu (許含光)
- Crispy Band (Crispy脆樂團)
- The Dinosaur's Skin (恐龍的皮)
