= Sandee Chan =

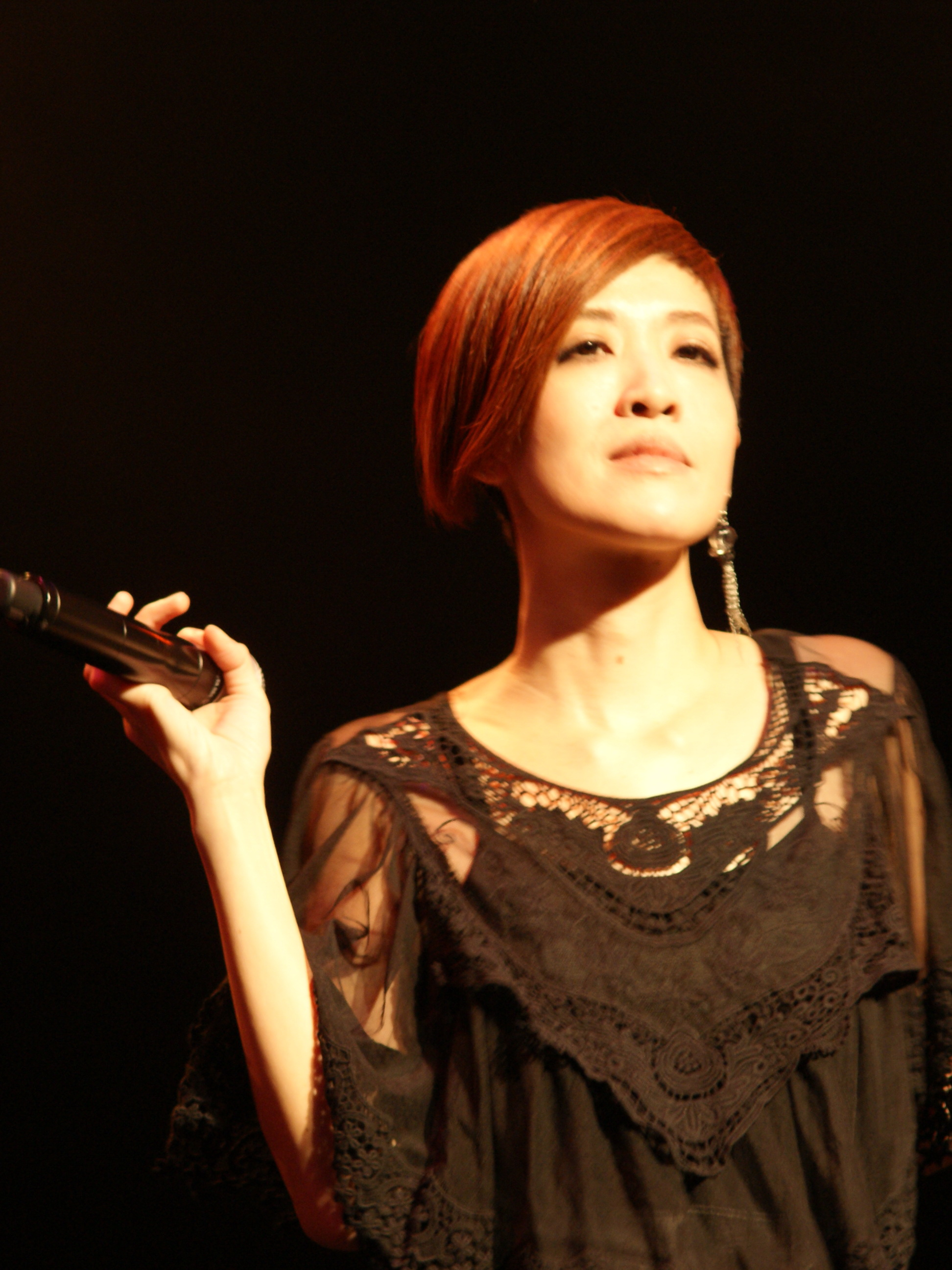
- Sandee Chan in 2013
- Born: 19 July 1970 (age 56); Philippines
- Education: National Chengchi University
- Occupations: Singer-songwriter, music producer, director
- Years active: 1994–present
- Spouse: Arthur Chan
- Awards: Golden Melody Awards – Best Album Producer; 2005; Best Mandarin Album; 2005; Best Mandarin Female Singer; 2009
- Musical career
- Genre: Pop
- Label: Pourquoi Pas Music
- Website: www.sandeechan.com

Sandee Chan (Chinese: 陳珊妮; pinyin: Chén Shānnī; born 19 July 1970) is a Taiwanese singer-songwriter, music producer and director.

== Early life ==
Chan was born in the Philippines on 19 July 1970. Her family has Chinese roots, and she has Shanghai ancestry. Due to her father's factory, her family moved to Taiwan.

Chan holds a BA in journalism from National Chengchi University.

== Career ==
Chan began playing the piano as a child and created her own songs while a student at National Chengchi University in Taiwan. She was signed by an independent record label after performing on the university music contest Young Star in 1991, and wrote songs for Jeff Chang and Huang Pin-Yuan before releasing her first single and album in 1994. She has released 14 solo albums.

=== Studio albums ===
- 1994: Washington Chopped Down the Cherry Tree (華盛頓砍倒櫻桃樹)
- 1995: Leaving on a Jet Plane (乘噴射機離去)
- 1996: Sing till the End of the World (四季)
- 1999: I’m Not the Kind of Girl (我從來不是幽默的女生)
- 2000: Perfect Moan (完美的呻吟)
- 2004: Then, We All Wept (後來 我們都哭了)
- 2008: What If It Matters (如果有一件事是重要的)
- 2011: I Love You, John
- 2013: A Low-Key Life (低調人生)
- 2015: When Sorrow Being Downloaded Twice (如同悲傷被下載了兩次)
- 2017: Martial God Cardea (戰神卡爾迪亞)
- 2019: Juvenile A
- 2022: Discipline (調教)

=== Other albums ===
- 1997: The Night When Bad Guys Weren't So Bad (live album)
- 1997: Cannot Be Ignored Collection 1994–1997 ("best of" album)
- 2000: Sandee Chan Collection 1994–1999 ("best of" album)
- 2004: Happy Together 2003 (live album)
- 2004: An Addiction Of Beauty (live album)
- 2004: Material-Girl Coin (Chan, Li Duan Xian and Wang Ke Le album)
- 2005: Material-girls.com 2005 (Chan, Li Duan Xian and Wang Ke Le album)
- 2009: What If It Matters (English album)
- 2009: A Tale of Two Chens (Chan and Kimmy EP)
- 2011: 19 (Chan and Chen Chien Chi Album)

== Awards ==
Chan was awarded Best Album and Best Album Producer at the 16th Golden Melody Awards in 2005.

At the 20th Golden Melody Awards in 2009, she won Best Mandarin Female Singer.
