= Mayday discography =

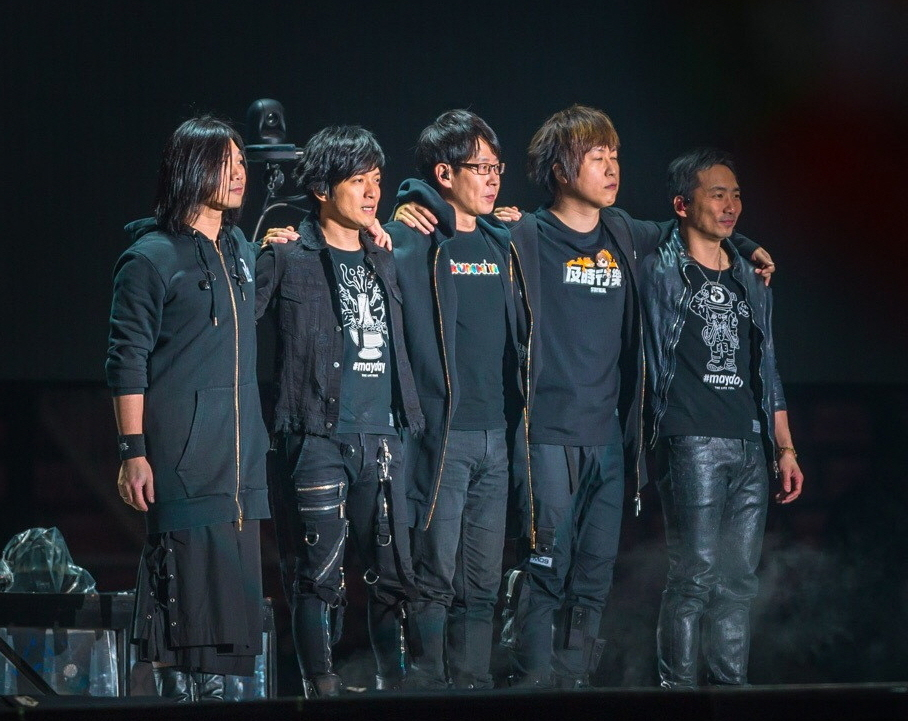
- Mayday in 2018
- Studio albums: 9
- Live albums: 11
- Compilation albums: 3

The discography of Taiwanese rock band Mayday includes 9 studio albums, 11 live albums, and 3 compilation albums. The band's debut studio album, Mayday's First Album, was released in July 1999 and sold over 300,000 copies in Taiwan. Their follow-up albums, Viva Love (2002) and People Life, Ocean Wild (2003), were similarly successful, with each selling over 350,000 copies in the country.

Mayday's sixth studio album, Born to Love, sold over 800,000 copies across Asia, including over 200,000 copies in Taiwan. Second Round (2011) was certified 10× Platinum by the Recording Industry Foundation in Taiwan (RIT).

== Albums ==
=== Studio albums ===
Title	Album details	Peak chart positions				Sales	Certifications
Title	Album details	TWN	CHN (Note: The Sino Chart was published from 2009 to 2015.)	JPN	SGP	Sales	Certifications
Mayday's First Album (第一張創作專輯)	Released: July 7, 1999; Label: Rock Records; Formats: CD, digital download	—	—	—	—	TWN: 300,000	
Viva Love (愛情萬歲)	Released: July 7, 2000; Label: Rock Records; Formats: CD, digital download	—	—	—	—	TWN: 350,000	
People Life, Ocean Wild (人生海海)	Released: July 5, 2001; Label: Rock Records; Formats: CD, digital download	—	—	—	—	TWN: 350,000	
Time Machine (時光機)	Released: November 11, 2003; Label: Rock Records; Formats: CD, digital download	—	—	—	6	TWN: 270,000	
God's Children Are All Dancing (神的孩子都在跳舞)	Released: November 5, 2004; Label: Rock Records; Formats: CD, digital download	—	—	—	3	TWN: 140,000	
Born to Love (為愛而生)	Released: December 29, 2006; Label: B'in Music, Rock Records; Formats: CD, digital download	1	—	—	—	TWN: 200,000; Asia: 800,000	
Poetry of the Day After (後青春期的詩)	Released: October 23, 2008; Label: B'in Music, Rock Records; Formats: CD, digital download, streaming	1	15	—	—	TWN: 205,000	
Second Round (第二人生)	Released: December 16, 2011; Label: B'in Music; Formats: CD, digital download, streaming	1	6	—	—	TWN: 280,000	RIT: 10× Platinum
History of Tomorrow (自傳)	Released: July 21, 2016; Label: B'in Music; Formats: CD, digital download, streaming	—	—	14	—	TWN: 100,000	
"—" denotes releases that did not chart, were not released in that region, or chart did not exist.

=== Live albums ===
Title	Album details	Peak chart positions	Sales
Title	Album details	CHN	Sales
The 168th Performance (第168場演唱會Live全紀錄)	Released: November 30, 1999; Label: Rock Records; Formats: CD, digital download	—	
A Hundred Thousand Youths Standing Up Live (十萬青年站出來 Live巡迴演唱會全記錄)	Released: December 21, 2000; Label: Rock Records; Formats: CD, digital download	—	
Where Are You Going? Live (你要去哪裡 台灣巡迴演唱會Live全紀錄)	Released: December 25, 2001; Label: Rock Records; Formats: CD, digital download	—	
City of the Sky Live (天空之城復出演唱會 Live全紀錄)	Released: March 30, 2004; Label: Rock Records; Formats: CD, digital download	—	
Final Home – When We're All Together Live (Final Home 當我們混在一起 Live全紀錄)	Released: May 27, 2005; Label: Rock Records; Formats: CD, digital download	—	
Leaving the Surface of the Earth Live (離開地球表面Jump! The World 2007極限大碟)	Released: July 29, 2007; Label: B'in Music; Formats: CD, digital download	—	
100,000 People & Mayday Live (十萬人·出頭天 Live全紀錄)	Released: March 20, 2009; Label: B'in Music; Formats: CD, digital download, streaming	—	
D.N.A. Live! (「創造」小巨蛋 DNA LIVE! 演唱會創紀錄音)	Released: December 4, 2009; Label: B'in Music; Formats: CD, digital download, streaming	—	
Mayday Nowhere World Tour Live (諾亞方舟 世界巡迴演唱會Live)	Released: September 27, 2013; Label: B'in Music; Formats: CD, digital download, streaming	11	
Super Slipper Live Part 3 (超犀利趴三《團團團團團》演唱會 LIVE)	Released: August 8, 2014; Label: B'in Music; Formats: CD, digital download, streaming	—	
Life Live (人生無限公司)	Released: May 23, 2019; Label: B'in Music; Formats: CD, digital download, streaming	—	

=== Compilation albums ===
Title	Album details	Peak chart positions			Sales
Title	Album details	TWN	CHN	JPN	Sales
Just My Pride (知足 最真傑作選)	Released: August 26, 2005; Label: Rock Records; Formats: CD, digital download	1	—	—	TWN: 110,000
Mayday×五月天 the Best of 1999‐2013	Released: November 13, 2013; Label: A-Sketch; Formats: CD, digital download, streaming	—	—	15	JPN: 6,254
步步 自選作品輯 The Best of 1999-2013	Released: December 30, 2013; Label: B'in Music; Formats: CD, digital download, streaming	1	5	—	TWN: 100,000

== Singles ==
=== Japanese singles ===
Title	Year	Peak chart positions	Sales	Album
Title	Year	JPN	Sales	Album
"Do You Ever Shine?"	2014	18	JPN: 8,615	Non-album singles
"Your Legend～燃ゆる命～"	2015	31		Non-album singles
