= List of awards and nominations received by Mayday =

This is an incomplete list of awards and nominations received by Taiwanese Mandopop alternative rock band Mayday.

== Berlin Music Video Awards ==
Year	Category	Nominated work	Result
2019	Best Animation	FINAL CHAPTER	Nominated

== Golden Melody Awards ==
The Golden Melody Awards (Chinese: 金曲獎; pinyin: Jīn Qǔ Jiǎng) are presented annually by the Government Information Office of the Republic of China (Taiwan) and is Taiwan's equivalent to the Grammy Awards.

Year	Ceremony	Category	Nominated work	Result	Ref.
2001	12th	Best Musical Group	Mayday	Won	
2004	15th	Best Musical Group	Mayday	Won	
2009	20th	Song of the Year	"你不是真正的快樂" (You Are Not Genuinely Happy)	Nominated	
2009	20th	Best Lyricist	Ashin for "我心中尚未崩壞的地方" (The Yet Unbroken Part of My Heart)	Nominated	
2009	20th	Best Lyricist	Ashin for "如煙" (Like Smoke)	Nominated	
2009	20th	Best Musical Group	Poetry of the Day After	Won	
2012	23rd	Song of the Year	Noah's Ark (from Second Life)	Won	
2012	23rd	Best Album Mandarin	Second Life (no where-End Edition)	Won	
2012	23rd	Best Composition	Masa for Noah's Ark	Won	
2012	23rd	Best Lyricsist	Ashin for Noah's Ark	Nominated	
2012	23rd	Best Music Arrangement	Masa for Noah's Ark	Won	
2012	23rd	Producer of the Year for Album	Second Life (no where-End Edition)	Won	
2012	23rd	Best Musical Group	Mayday	Won	
2017	28th	Album of the Year	History of Tomorrow	Nominated	
2017	28th	Song of the Year	"Tough" (from History of Tomorrow)	Nominated	
2017	28th	Best Album Mandarin	History of Tomorrow	Won	
2017	28th	Best Album Producer	History of Tomorrow	Nominated	
2017	28th	Best Composer	Monster for "Here, After, Us" (from History of Tomorrow)	Nominated	
2017	28th	Best Lyricist	Ashin for "Almost Famous" (from History of Tomorrow)	Won	
2017	28th	Best Musical Group	History of Tomorrow	Nominated	

== HITO Radio Music Awards ==
The HITO Radio Music Awards (Chinese: HITO流行音樂獎) are given annually by HITO Radio, the parent company of Taiwanese radio station Hit FM. The order is not specified for the Top 10 Songs of the Year.

Year	Category	Nomination	Result	Ref.
2004	Top 10 Songs of the Year	"武裝" (Armour) from Time Machine	Won	
2004	Best Band	Mayday	Won	
2005	Top 10 Songs of the Year	"倔強" from God's Children Are All Dancing	Won	
2005	Best Band	Mayday	Won	
2006	Most Popular Band (popular Vote)	Mayday	Won	
2008	Top 10 Songs of the Year	"天使" (Angel) from Born to Love	Won	
2008	Best Band	Mayday	Won	
2008	Most Popular Band (popular Vote)	Mayday	Won	
2009	Top 10 Songs of the Year	"突然好想你" (Suddenly Missing You) from Poetry of the Day After	Won	
2009	Best Composer	Ashin for Poetry of the Day After	Won	
2009	Longest Charting Album	Poetry of the Day After	Won	
2009	Best Band	Mayday	Won	
2009	Asia Media Grand Prize	Mayday	Won	

== Metro Radio Hit Awards ==
The Metro Radio Hit Awards (Chinese: 新城勁爆頒獎禮), like the Metro Radio Mandarin Music Awards, are given annually (usually in December) by Hong Kong radio station Metro Info. In contrast to the Mandarin Music Awards, the Hit Awards focuses on Cantopop music, and provide a few honours for Mandarin-language music.

Year	Category	Nomination	Result	Ref.
2005	Mandarin Mandarin Band	Mayday	Won	

== 1999 ==
- Taiwan Association of Music Workers - Top 10 Singles of The Year for 'Peter and Mary'《志明與春嬌》
- Hit FM Taipei Music Net - Best Single of The Year for 'Peter and Mary'
- China Times - Best Newcomer Band of The Year Award
- Channel [V] - Newcomer Band With Most Potential Award
- GTV and San Li Channel - Voted Most Popular Band

== 2000 ==
- Hit FM Awards - Best Band of The Year
- Hit FM Awards - Best Single of The Year for 'Tenderness'《溫柔》
- Min Sheng Newspaper - Voted Top 10 Artistes

== 2001 ==
- Singapore Golden Awards - Best Band
- Channel [V] - Best Band
- Global Chinese Music Awards - Best Band
- Singapore FM 93.3 - Top 10 Albums of the Year
- Taiwan Association of Music Workers - Top Ten Albums of the Year for 'Viva Love'
- Taiwan Association of Music Workers - Top Ten Singles of the Year for 'Tenderness'
- 好樂迪 Most Picked KTV Song for 'Peter and Mary'
- 7th Chinese Music Awards - Most Popular Song for 'Loneliness Terminator'《終結孤單》

== 2002 ==
- G-Music Taiwan Albums Ranking - Best selling Band of the Year
- Channel [V] - Most Popular Band

== 2003 ==
- 9th Chinese Music Awards - Most Popular Band
- TVB8 Channel - Best Band

== 2004 ==
- Singapore Golden Awards - Best Band
- 10th Chinese Music Awards - Best Band
- 2004 MusicRadio Top - Best Band 、Most Popular Band Among Youth
- 5th Global Chinese Music Awards - Best Band
- 5th Global Chinese Music Awards - Top 25 Songs for 'Stubbornness' 《倔強》
- MusicRadio Top - Song of the Year for 'Stubbornness'
- Taiwan Association of Music Workers - Top Ten Albums of the Year
- Taiwan Association of Music Workers - Top Ten Songs of the Year for 'Stubbornness'

== 2005 ==
- Singapore Golden Awards - Best Band, Best Album, Best Composer

== 2006 ==
- 6th Global Chinese Music Awards - Best Band

== 2009 ==
- Singapore Golden Awards - Best Band, Best Album, Most Popular Group(最受歡迎團體), Asia Media (Band) [亞洲傳媒大獎（樂團）]
