= Golden Melody Award for Best Band =

Taiwanese music award

The Golden Melody Award for Best Band (Chinese: 金曲獎最佳樂團獎) is an award given by the Ministry of Culture of Taiwan. It was first presented in 2001. Mayday which is a band got the award before.

== Winners and nominees ==
Year	Recipient	Nominees	Ref
2001	Mayday - Viva Love (愛情萬歲)		
2002	The Labor Exchange Band - The Night March of the Chrysanthemums (菊花夜行軍)		
2003	Chthonic - Relentless Recurrence		
2004	Mayday - Time Machine (時光機)		
2005	Sheng Xiang & Water3 - Getting Dark (臨暗)		
2006	The Chairman - Looking for a New World (找一個新世界)		
2007	Sodagreen - Little Universe (小宇宙)		
2008	Sodagreen - Incomparable Beauty (無與倫比的美麗)		
2009	Mayday - Poetry of the Day After		
2010	1976 - Manic Pixie Dream Girl (不合時宜)		
2011	Matzka - Matzka		
2012	Mayday - Second Round		
2013	Monkey Pilot - Big Child		
2014	Mixer - Circus Movement (馬戲團運動)		
2015	Buddha Jump - Let You See (給你看)		
2016	Sodagreen - Winter Endless (冬 未了)		
2017	No Party for Cao Dong - The Servile (醜奴兒)	Flux - Pluralism (多元觀點); Mayday - History of Tomorrow (自傳); GDJYB - 23:59 Before Tomorrow; Lion - Lion; Gina's Can - The Funky Song for Tung Blossom (桐花放客); The Chairman - The Boyhood of Chairman (董事長的少年時代)	
2018	The Chairman - The Offering (祭)	Fire EX. - Begin the Second Half (進擊下半場); Sweet John - Dear; EggPlantEgg - Cartoon Character (卡通人物); LEO37+SOSS - Be Well World; Mr. Loud Who Chance - I'm Not a Superman (我不是超人)	
2019	Chthonic – Battlefields of Asura (政治)	Alter Ego – Pumpkinney Fan Club; Cassa Nova – Sunset Rollercoaster; Fairy Tales of the Ocean Deep – Flesh Juicer; WonFu Love Songs – WonFu; King of Light – Bisiugroup; Him – Tizzy Bac	
2020	Fire EX. – Stand Up Like A Taiwanese (無名英雄)	Never Die – TRASH; Cassa Nova – Accusefive; Somewhere in time, I love you. – Flesh Juicer; Call me when Night go Blue – Iruka Porisu; We Are Gonnna Get Married – EggPlantEgg; The art of embarrassment – Wayne's so sad; Existing like God – ZenKwun	
2021	Sunset Rollercoaster – SOFT STORM	Black & Toughness – OVDS; Water Snowflake Goes to Market – Sheng Xiang & Band; Alternate Moments – KST; Easy Come, Easy Go – Accusefive; Lady of the ocean – Outlet Drift; Bird and Reflections – deca joins	
2022	Flesh Juicer – GOLDEN 太子 BRO	I Mean Us – Into Innerverse; Wild Thing – UNDO (溯); Amazing Show – Paramount (多色寶山大王); No-Nonsense Collective – No Mercy; TRASH – Holy Trip!; Undecimber Fin. – One That Reminds Me of You (和你蠻像的一隻)	
