= No Party for Cao Dong =

Taiwanese rock band

No Party For Cao Dong
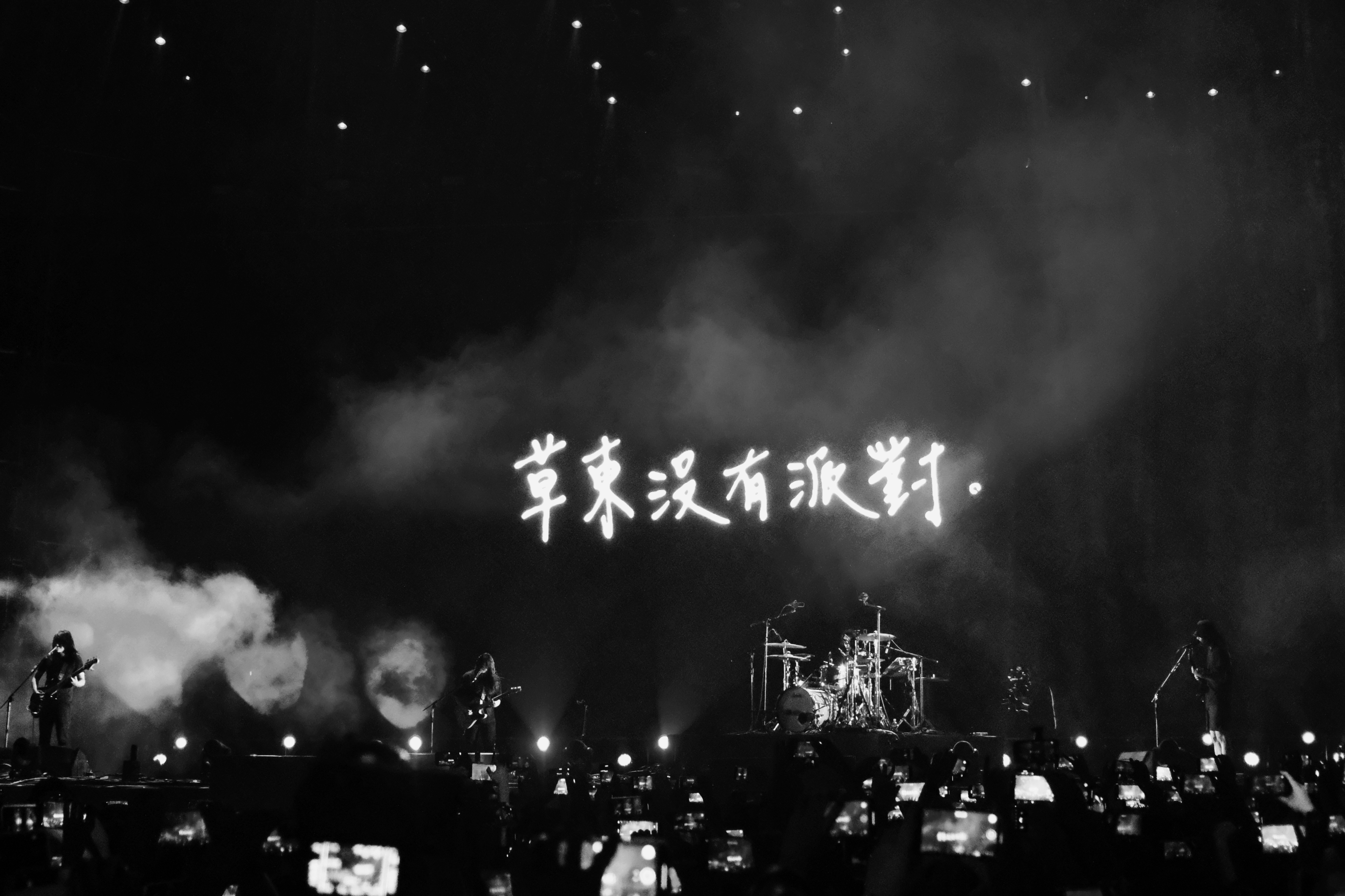

Background information
- Origin: Taiwan
- Genres: alternative rock; indie rock; post-rock; grunge
- Years active: 2012-present
- Members: Wood Lin; Judy Chan (Chu Chu); Sam Yang; Huang Shih-wei
- Past members: Sam Cheng; Leo Liu; Fan Tsai

Chinese name
- Traditional Chinese: 草東沒有派對
- Simplified Chinese: 草东没有派对
Transcriptions
Standard Mandarin
- Hanyu Pinyin: Cǎo Dōng Méiyǒu Pàiduì
- Bopomofo: ㄘㄠˇㄉㄨㄥㄇㄟˊㄧㄡˇㄆㄞˋㄉㄨㄟˋ

No Party For Cao Dong (Chinese: 草東沒有派對) is a Taiwanese indie rock band currently consisting of Wood Lin (vocals and guitar), Judy Chan (guitar), Sam Yang (bass), and Huang Shih-wei (drums).

== History ==
=== 2012–2014: Formation ===
Guitarists and vocalists Wood Lin and Judy Chan met each other in high school, and remained friends during their days at Taipei National University of the Arts. In 2012, they started a band with schoolmates Lee You on bass and Huang Shih-Wei on drums, naming it Party at Cao Dong Street (草東街派對) after the eponymous road in Shilin District, Taipei, where they often hung out; Lin would skateboard there while Chan would run alongside him, accompanying him to lose weight. Initially, they played a style of electronic rock under the influence of Two Door Cinema Club, and performed at various events within and out of their campus.

Following a series of line-up changes which saw the departures of Lee and Huang, the remaining members decided to rename the band No Party for Cao Dong in 2014, and enlisted FUBAR frontman Sam Cheng and Leo Liu to fill the bass and drum spots respectively. The band would then upload their original tracks "Old Zhang", "Grisly Me" and "Fifty" on the Internet. It was at that time when Cheng was conscripted for military service, as such they took a hiatus for nearly a year. During this period, the band started to adopt a different attitude towards their later works and consider making music seriously, hence in early 2015, they recruited fellow Taipei National University of the Arts graduate Sam Yang to take Cheng's place on bass. Cheng, meanwhile, returned to his previous band FUBAR, which had since been renamed to Grey Dwarf Star from 2016 and Deca Joins since 2017.

=== 2015–2017: The Servile and rise to popularity ===
In 2015, the band self-released an EP which sold out in a single day. On May 20, they made their return to the stage with their first major concert, titled "We Were All Born to Our Mothers". Starting from September that year, tickets to their performances at various small venues would often sell out quickly; subsequently their single "Wimpish" achieved over 180,000 views on YouTube following its release. The same year, they filmed their first music video "Wayfarer", in which Liu served as director.

In 2016, the band released their first studio album, The Servile; shortly afterwards, it gained widespread attention among professional critics after they emerged as a dark horse in Taiwan's independent music scene. On May 21, they held their second major concert "We Were All Born to Our Mothers 2.0", which marked the debut of drummer Fan Tsai after Liu left to focus on shooting music videos. Tsai, a childhood friend of Chan, was previously the drummer for post-rock band Triple Deer. On October 29, they snatched three awards, including best band and best newcomer, at the 7th Golden Indie Music Awards.

On June 24, 2017, the band won a total of three awards at the 28th Golden Melody Awards, namely Best Musical Group, Best New Artist and Song of the Year for their song "Simon Says", the former in which they outperformed established acts such as Mayday.

=== 2019–present: International success and Fan Tsai's death ===
The band played at SXSW and NXNE in 2019. They wrote and recorded the title song for the video game Devotion by Red Candle Games in 2019.

The band had teased the release of new music with a livestream that would have begun on March 6, 2020. This however was cancelled, and their following album, which was planned for release in early 2020. was put on an indefinite delay due to the COVID-19 pandemic.

No Party For Cao Dong hosted a livestream on their YouTube channel which took place once a day from May 20 to May 23 and featured live performers acting out a story, the course of which was chosen in real-time by the viewers in the chat, determining how the narrative would play out. At the end of the final episode on May 23, a new song was debuted while the credits rolled.

In 2021, the band planned to hold their concert "We Were All Born to Our Mothers 6.0" for the first time at the Taipei Arena on May 22. Although 11,000 tickets were sold out in less than a minute, it was postponed indefinitely due to the COVID-19 pandemic. On October 30, drummer Fan Tsai was found dead at the age of 26 at a quarantine hotel in Taipei City following the band's return from Mainland China where they conducted a concert tour. Her quarantine period was originally going to end on November 8, and homicide was ruled out as there was no foreign intrusion on the scene and no suicide note was left. After much discussion, the remaining band members announced on November 25 that their "We Were All Born to Our Mothers 6.0" concert would be cancelled.

The band won three Golden Melody Awards, for Album of the Year, Best Mandarin Album, and Best Band in 2024, after releasing their second album, The Clod.

== Band members ==
Current members

- Wood Lin – lead guitar, vocals (2012–present)
- Judy Chan – rhythm guitar, vocals (2012–present)
- Sam Yang – bass guitar, vocals (2014–present; not touring since 2023)
- Huang Shih-wei – drums (2023–present)

Former members

- Sam Cheng – bass guitar (2013–2014)
- Leo Liu – drums (2014–2016)
- Fan Tsai – drums (2016–2021; her death)

Touring substitutes

- Dennis Chang – bass guitar, vocals (2023–present)

== Discography ==
=== Studio albums ===
| Title | Album details |
|---|---|
| The Servile | Released: April 30, 2016; Label: Rocksurf; Format: Digital download, CD |
| The Clod | Released: May 20, 2023; Label: BHappy; Format: Digital download, CD |

=== Extended plays ===
| Title | Album details |
|---|---|
| No Party for Cao Dong | Released: July 9, 2015; Label: self-released; Format: Homemade CD |

== Awards ==
| Year | Award | Category | Recipients | Result | Ref. |
|---|---|---|---|---|---|
| 2016 | 7th Golden Indie Music Awards | Best Band | No Party for Cao Dong | Won | |
| 2016 | 7th Golden Indie Music Awards | Best Newcomer | No Party for Cao Dong | Won | |
| 2016 | 7th Golden Indie Music Awards | Best Rock Single | "Simon Says" | Won | |
| 2016 | 7th Golden Indie Music Awards | Best Live Performance | No Party for Cao Dong | Nominated | |
| 2016 | 7th Golden Indie Music Awards | Best Album | The Servile | Nominated | |
| 2016 | 7th Golden Indie Music Awards | Best Rock Album | The Servile | Nominated | |
| 2017 | 12th KKBOX Music Awards | Artist of the Year | No Party for Cao Dong | Won | |
| 2017 | 28th Golden Melody Awards | Best Band | No Party for Cao Dong | Won | |
| 2017 | 28th Golden Melody Awards | Best New Artist | No Party for Cao Dong | Won | |
| 2017 | 28th Golden Melody Awards | Song of the Year | "Simon Says" | Won | |
| 2017 | 28th Golden Melody Awards | Album of the Year | The Servile | Nominated | |
| 2017 | 28th Golden Melody Awards | Best Composer | "Simon Says" | Nominated | |
| 2017 | 28th Golden Melody Awards | Best Lyricist | "Wimpish" | Nominated | |
| 2017 | 10th Freshmusic Awards | Album of the Year | The Servile | Won | |
| 2017 | 10th Freshmusic Awards | Best New Band | No Party for Cao Dong | Won | |
| 2017 | 17th Chinese Music Media Awards | Best New Band | No Party for Cao Dong | Won | |
| 2017 | 17th Chinese Music Media Awards | Best Band | No Party for Cao Dong | Nominated | |
| 2017 | 17th Chinese Music Media Awards | Best Rock Artist | No Party for Cao Dong | Nominated | |
| 2017 | 17th Chinese Music Media Awards | Mandarin Language Album of the Year | The Servile | Nominated | |
| 2017 | 17th Chinese Music Media Awards | Mandarin Language Song of the Year | "Simon Says" | Nominated | |
