= Love of May =

- Poster
- Traditional Chinese: 五月之戀
- Simplified Chinese: 五月之恋
- Hanyu Pinyin: Wǔ Yuè Zhī Liàn
- Directed by: Hsu Hsiao-ming
- Produced by: Peggy Chiao; Hsu Hsiao-ming; Tian Zhuangzhuang
- Starring: Bolin Chen; Liu Yifei
- Edited by: Liao Ching-sung
- Music by: Mayday
- Distributed by: Arc Light Films
- Release date: 16 July 2004 (Taiwan)
- Running time: 109 minutes
- Country: Taiwan
- Language: Mandarin

Love of May (Chinese: 五月之戀; pinyin: Wǔyuè Zhīliàn) is a 2004 Taiwanese film directed by Hsu Hsiao-ming and starring Bolin Chen and Liu Yifei. The film was inspired by Mayday, a famous rock band from Taiwan. It tells about the love story of Ah Lei, an administrator of Mayday's fansite, and Zhao Xuan, a fangirl of Mayday, who met and fell in love with each other through a lie.

== Plot ==
Ah Lei (Bolin Chen) is the younger brother of Stone, a guitarist of Mayday. He is also the administrator of Mayday's fansite, in charge of replying to fan letters and emails. One day, he befriended a girl named Zhao Xuan (Liu Yifei) through a chatroom. He told her that he's actually Ashin, the lead vocal of Mayday. She started writing letters to him, believing that he was Ashin. Finally, Xuan's peking opera group from school gets to leave Harbin and travel to Taiwan to perform. The two promised to meet in a library, but Ah Lei didn't have the courage to meet up with her. He decides to follow her around, but did not expect that she followed him back, and that she saw through his lies all along.

== Cast ==
- Bolin Chen as Ah Lei
- Liu Yifei as Zhao Xuan
- Tien Feng as Zhao Geng-sheng
- Mayday as themselves

== Production ==
- The filming of Love of May begun on Oct 18, 2003.
- The filming locations of Love of May include Taipei, Sanyi, and Harbin.

== Release ==
- Taiwan: July 16, 2004
- Mainland China: July 30, 2004

== Box Office ==
- Love of May earned 0.46 million New Taiwan dollars on its opening week at Taiwan.
- Love of May earned 1.16 million New Taiwan dollars at Taipei.
