= Heihei =

Heihei or hei hei may refer to:

- Hei Hei, a suburb of Christchurch, New Zealand, whose name comes from Māori heihei "chicken"
- "Hei hei", a song on the 2014 album Ikuiset lapset
- "Heihei", a 2010 episode of Hawaii Five-0
- Heihei, the drummer of Hong Kong band GDJYB
- Heihei, the pet rooster of the main character in the 2016 film Moana
- HeiHei, a roast chicken retail chain managed by Bounty Agro Ventures

== See also ==
- Heihe, a city in Heilongjiang, China
- Hey Hey (disambiguation)
