= 28th Golden Melody Awards =

Taiwanese music awards ceremony in 2017

- Date: 24 June 2017 (Popular music)
- Location: Taipei Arena, Taiwan (Popular music)
- Hosted by: Mickey Huang (Popular music)
- Website: http://gma.tavis.tw/GM28/GMA/default_en.asp

Television/radio coverage
- Network: TTV

The 28th Golden Melody Awards (Chinese: 第28屆金曲獎) took place in Taipei, Taiwan in 2017. The award ceremony for the popular music categories was hosted by Mickey Huang and broadcast on TTV on 24 June.

== Winners and nominees ==
Below is the list of winners and nominees for the popular music categories.

Vocal category – Record label awards
Album of the Year	Song of the Year
Yaangad – Sangpuy; Village Besieged – Sheng-xiang Band; The Servile – No Party for Cao Dong; Journey to the West – Khalil Fong; The Silent Star Stone – Guo Ding; Talk About Eve – Eve Ai; History of Tomorrow – Mayday; Run! Frantic Flowers! – Waa Wei; Million Songs Hill – Xu Jun; Ding Zi Hua – Wu Bai; Taipei Didilong – DJ Didilong; Reborn – Fire EX.; Chiu Nien – Hsieh Ming-yu; TaiKo Electro Company – TaiKo Electro Company; The Boyhood of Chairman – The Chairman; The Golden Age – Urban Cat; Mosaic of the Night – Misa x Underground Stream; Smiley Universe – Wen Yin-chang, Lo Su-jung, Lin Sheng Xiang; The Funky Song for Tung Blossom – Gina's Can; Wo Ba Jiang Hai Lu Wo Ma Jiang Si Xian – Chen Wei-roo; Tracing the River of Life – Tai Siao-chun; Longer Story – Long-Ger; Vavayan – A Bao; Sadu Kata Buan – Sadu Kata Buan	"Simon Says" (from The Servile) – No Party for Cao Dong; "Love Confession" (from Jay Chou's Bedtime Stories) – Jay Chou; "Traces of Time in Love" (from Traces of Time in Love) – Rainie Yang; "Peng Kung" (from Ding Zi Hua) – Wu Bai; "The Sum of Us" (from Talk About Eve) – Eve Ai; "Tough" (from History of Tomorrow) – Mayday; "Centrifugal Force" (from Centrifugal Force) – Faith Yang; "Spoiled Innocence" (from Sell Like Hot Cakes) – Yoga Lin
Best Album Mandarin	Best Album Taiwanese
History of Tomorrow – Mayday; Journey to the West – Khalil Fong; The Silent Star Stone – Guo Ding; Talk About Eve – Eve Ai; Run! Frantic Flowers! – Waa Wei; Million Songs Hill – Xu Jun	Ding Zi Hua – Wu Bai; Taipei Didilong – DJ Didilong; Reborn – Fire EX.; Chiu Nien – Hsieh Ming-yu; TaiKo Electro Company – TaiKo Electro Company; The Boyhood of Chairman – The Chairman
Best Album Hakka	Best Album Aboriginal Language
The Golden Age – Urban Cat; Mosaic of the Night – Misa x Underground Stream; Smiley Universe – Wen Yin-chang, Lo Su-jung, Lin Sheng-xiang; The Funky Song for Tung Blossom – Gina's Can; Wo Ba Jiang Hai Lu Wo Ma Jiang Si Xian – Chen Wei-roo	Vavayan – A Bao; Yaangad – Sangpuy; Tracing the River of Life – Tai Siao-chun; Longer Story – Long-Ger; Sadu Kata Buan – Sadu Kata Buan
Best Music Video	
"Chai" (from Chang and Lee) – Director: Peng Jhun-yi, Zhu Qi-guang, Chang Hsi-an; "Bedtime Stories" (from Jay Chou's Bedtime Stories) – Director: Jay Chou; "Mercury Records" (from The Silent Star Stone) – Director: Huang Chieh-yu; "Love Yourself" (from Day by Day) – Director: Bill Chia; "Tough" (from History of Tomorrow) – Director: Muh Chen; "Dust My Shoulders Off" (from Dust My Shoulders Off) – Director: Liao Jen-shuai	
Vocal category – Individual awards
Best Composer	Best Lyricist
"Centrifugal Force" (from Centrifugal Force) – Europa Huang; "The Fog Space" (from The Silent Star Stone) – Guo Ding; "The Sum of Us" (from Talk About Eve) – Eve Ai; "Here, After, Us" (from History of Tomorrow) – Monster; "Simon Says" (from The Servile) – No Party for Cao Dong; "Only You" (from Run! Frantic Flowers!) – Waa Wei; "Hsia-pu ワルツ" (from Chiu Nien) – Hsieh Ming-yu	"Almost Famous" (from History of Tomorrow) – Ashin; "Traces of Time in Love" (from Traces of Time in Love) – Wu Tsing-fong; "Peng Kung" (from Ding Zi Hua) – Wu Bai; "The Fog Space" (from The Silent Star Stone) – Guo Ding; "The Sum of Us" (from Talk About Eve) – Eve Ai; "Wimpish" (from The Servile) – No Party for Cao Dong; "Pi-ka Luggage" (from Chiu Nien) – Hsieh Ming-yu
Best Arrangement	Best Album Producer
"Darling" (from Imperfections) – Ellen Loo; "Hunter" (from Yaangad) – Hung Cheng-wen, Jen Chung-chiang; "Peng Kung" (from Ding Zi Hua) – Wu Bai & China Blue; "Bad Check" (from Talk About Eve) – Zhan Xian-Zhe; "Izuwa" (from Vavayan) – Huang Ching Shih Yi, Derrick Sepnio, Fergus Chow; "You Made My Day" (from You Made My Day) – Howe Chen	Vavayan – Huang Ching Shih Yi; Yaangad – IO Chen; Journey to the West – Khalil Fong, Derrick Sepnio; Mr. Miss – Tu Kai, Ko Fei; History of Tomorrow – Mayday; Run! Frantic Flowers! – George Chen
Best Single Producer	Best Male Vocalist Mandarin
"You Made My Day" (from You Made My Day) – Howe; "Traces of Time in Love" (from Traces of Time in Love) – George Chen; "Jia Jia Song" (from Still Missing) – Huang Ching Shih Yi; "Still Missing" (from Still Missing) – Masa of Mayday; "Centrifugal Force" (from Centrifugal Force) – Europa Huang, Chen Chun-hao; "Take It Easy" (from Longer Story) – Dakanow; "Everyday Is a Miracle" (from Day by Day) – Sandee Chan	Journey to the West – Khalil Fong; Jay Chou's Bedtime Stories – Jay Chou; The Silent Star Stone – Guo Ding; What a Folk!!!!!! – Crowd Lu; Sell Like Hot Cakes – Yoga Lin; Cross over Asia – Namewee; Hard Knock – Dwagie
Best Female Vocalist Mandarin	Best Male Vocalist Taiwanese
Talk About Eve – Eve Ai; Still Missing – Jia Jia; Run! Frantic Flowers! – Waa Wei; Imperfections – Ellen Joyce Loo; Centrifugal Force – Faith Yang; Queen of Queens – Miss Ko	Chiou Nien – Hsieh Ming-yu; Love Is So Painful – Daniel Luo; The Door – Liao Shih-hsien; Ding Zi Hua – Wu Bai; Taipei Didilong – DJ Didilong; Bottom of My Heart – Yuming Lai
Best Female Vocalist Taiwanese	Best Vocalist Hakka
A Song of Missing – Olivia Tsao; Sound of the Wind – Elly Chang; Singing to Myself – Showlen Maya; Twin Flowers – Huang Fei; The Age of Innocence – Sasha Li	The Golden Age – Urban Cat; Mosaic of the Night – Misa x Underground Stream; Shepherd Boy – Robin Tseng; Wo Ba Jiang Hai Lu Wo Ma Jiang Si Xian – Wei Ru Chen
Best Vocalist Aboriginal Language	Best Musical Group
Yaangad – Sangpuy; Zemiyan – Cemelesai Pasasauv; Tracing the River of Life – Tai Siao-chun; Longer Story – Long-Ger; Vavayan – A Bao; Sadu Kata Buan – Tulbus Mangququ	The Servile – No Party for Cao Dong; Pluralism – Flux; History of Tomorrow – Mayday; 23:59 Before Tomorrow – GDJYB; Lion – Lion; The Funky Song for Tung Blossom – Gina's Can; The Boyhood of Chairman – The Chairman
Best Vocal Collaboration	Best New Artist
Mr. Miss – Mr. Miss; One – Guess What; Power Station 20th – Power Station; Loneliness Will Be Over, Away, and Gone – Astro Bunny; Music Walker – Grasshopper; Radio Mars – Radio Mars	The Servile – No Party for Cao Dong; Pluralism – Flux; Mr. Miss – Mr. Miss; Abstract Painting – Shio; I Am Erika – Erika; Gong – Gong
Instrumental category – Record label awards
Best Instrumental Album	
Sedar – Sedar Chin; Cin Cinema – CinCin Lee; All Kinds of Good – Martin "Musa" Musaubach; Fade to Blue – Chung Yu-feng, David Chen; 07 Sessions – Toby Mak	
Instrumental category – Individual awards
Best Instrumental Album Producer	Best Instrumental Composer
CinCin Lee – Cin Cinema; Martin "Musa" Musaubach – All Kinds of Good; Chung Yu-feng – Fade to Blue; Sedar Chin – Sedar; Lawrence Ku – Proper Up!	Sedar Chin – "Arboreal Tunnel" (from Sedar); CinCin Lee – "Taipei Andante" (from Cin Cinema); Martin "Musa" Musaubach – "All Kinds of Good" (from All Kinds of Good); David Chen – "Fade to Blue" (from Fade to Blue); Tseng Tseng-yi – "Call It Anything" (from 07 Sessions)
Technical category – Individual awards
Best Recording Package	
Welcome to the Next Level – Starr Chen; Yaangad – Sangpuy; Village Besieged – Sheng-xiang Band; When Will Me Meet Again – Chan Ya-wen; Cin Cinema – CinCin Lee	
Technical category – Record label awards
Best Vocal Recording Album	Best Instrumental Recording Album
Yaangad – Sangpuy; Journey to the West – Khalil Fong; #MWHYB – Vanness Wu; Thief – Penny Tai; Flow – Winnie Hsin	Sedar – Sedar Chin; Cin Cinema – CinCin Lee; Ice Fantasy Original Soundtrack – V.K; Chromatics – Tseng Tseng-yi; Kind of True – Mission Formosa
Special Contribution Award
Chi Lu-hsia (Chi Chiu-ying); Chang Yu-sheng
Jury Award
Village Besieged – Sheng-xiang Band
