= Poetry of the Day After =

Studio album by Mayday
- Released: October 23, 2008
- Recorded: 2008
- Genres: Mandopop; rock
- Length: 49:16
- Languages: Mandarin; Hokkien
- Label: B'in Music

Mayday chronology
Born to Love (2006)	Poetry of the Day After (2008)	The Second Round (2011)

Alternative cover

Singles from Poetry of the Day After
- 1. "Suddenly Missing You So Bad" Released: October 23, 2008; 2. "You Are Not Truly Happy" Released: October 23, 2008

Poetry of the Day After (Chinese: 後青春期的詩; pinyin: Hòu qīngchūnqí de shī) is the seventh studio album by Taiwanese rock band Mayday. It was released on October 23, 2008, by Rock Records and B'in Music. The music video for "Like Smoke" features Taiwanese actor James Wen.

== Songs ==
The tracks "Suddenly Missing You So Bad", "You Are Not Truly Happy" and "Breakthrough Day" are listed at number 8, 36 and 80 respectively on Hit Fm Taiwan's Hit Fm Annual Top 100 Singles Chart for 2008. "Suddenly Missing You So Bad" won one of the Top 10 Songs of the Year at the 2009 HITO Radio Music Awards presented by Taiwanese radio station Hit FM. The song "Chhut-thâu-thiⁿ" is recorded in Taiwanese Hokkien.

== Reception ==
According to Taiwan's G-Music chart the album is the fourth best selling album in Taiwan in 2009. It was also nominated for several awards at the 20th Golden Melody Awards, including Best Song for "You Are Not Truly Happy" and "Poetry of the Day After". It won Best Band for their work on this album. At the Singapore Golden Awards, Poetry of the Day After won Best Album.

== Track listing ==
All lyrics are written by Ashin.

No.	Title	Music	Translation	Length
1.	"突然好想你" (Túrán hǎo xiǎng nǐ)	Ashin	Suddenly Missing You So Bad	4:26
2.	"生存以上 生活以下" (Shēngcún yǐshàng shēnghuó yǐxià)	Masa	More Than Surviving, Less Than Living	4:38
3.	"你不是真正的快樂" (Nǐ bùshì zhēnzhèng de kuàilè)	Ashin	You Are Not Truly Happy	4:59
4.	"爆肝" (Bào gān)	Ashin	Liver-busting	3:00
5.	"噢買尬 (O My God)" (Ōmǎigà)	Ashin	Oh My God	2:57
6.	"出頭天" (Chhut-thâu-thiⁿ (Chūtóu tiān))	Ashin	Breakthrough Day	4:14
7.	"我心中尚未崩壞的地方" (Wǒ xīnzhōng shàngwèi bēng huài dì dìfāng)	Ashin & Monster	The Yet Unbroken Part of My Heart	5:25
8.	"春天的吶喊" (Chūntiān de nàhǎn)	Monster	Spring's Shout	3:43
9.	"夜訪吸血鬼" (Yè fǎng xīxuèguǐ)	Guan You	Interview with the Vampire	4:10
10.	"如煙" (Rú yān)	Stone	Like Smoke	5:14
11.	"後青春期的詩" (Hòu qīngchūnqí de shī)	Ashin	Poetry of the Day After	2:19
12.	"笑忘歌" (Xiào wàng gē)	Monster	The Song of Laughter and Forgetting	4:14

== Charts ==
=== Weekly charts ===
Chart (2008)	Peak position
Taiwanese Albums (G-Music)	1

=== Year-end charts ===
Chart (2008)	Position
Taiwanese Albums (G-Music)	1

Chart (2009)	Position
Taiwanese Albums (G-Music)	4

== Sales ==
Region	Certification	Certified units/sales
Taiwan	—	205,000
