= Second Round (album) =

Second Life
- Now Here version

Studio album by Mayday
- Released: December 16, 2011
- Recorded: 2011
- Studio: Hitokuchi-zaka Studio (Tokyo)
- Genre: Mandopop; rock
- Length: 56:35
- Language: Mandarin
- Label: B'in Music

Mayday chronology
Poetry of the Day After (2008)	Second Life (2011)	History of Tomorrow (2016)

Second Round (Chinese: 第二人生; pinyin: Dì èr rénshēng) is the eighth studio album by Taiwanese rock band Mayday. It was released on December 16, 2011. In 2012, it was certified 10 Platinum by the Recording Industry Foundation in Taiwan (RIT) for sales of 128,754 units and NT$56,158,622.

== Track listing ==
All lyrics are written by Ashin.

Second Round – No Where edition
No.	Title	Music	Translation	Length
1.	"2012"	Ashin	2012	4:48
2.	"倉頡"	Stone	Cang Jie	5:01
3.	"洗衣機"	Monster	Washing Machine	4:03
4.	"歪腰"	Monster	Orz	3:09
5.	"乾杯"	Ashin	Cheers	4:49
6.	"我不願讓你一個人"	Ashin and Guan You	I Don't Want to Leave You Alone	4:25
7.	"星空"	Stone	Starry Night	4:43
8.	"三個傻瓜"	Monster	Three Fools	4:15
9.	"末日"	Mayday	Doomsday	0:03
10.	"OAOA (丟掉名字性別)"	Ashin	OAOA (Throw off Your Name and Gender)	4:42
11.	"第二人生"	Monster	Second Life	4:28
12.	"諾亞方舟"	Masa	Noah's Ark	5:44
13.	"有些事現在不做 一輩子都不會做了"	Monster	For Somethings, If You Don't Do It Now, You'll Never Do	3:48
14.	"T1213121 (Bonus Track)"	Mayday	T1213121 (Bonus Track)	2:09
Total length:				56:07

All lyrics are written by Ashin.

Second Round – Now Here edition
No.	Title	Music	Translation	Length
1.	"有些事現在不做 一輩子都不會做了"	Monster	For Somethings, If You Don't Do It Now, You'll Never Do	3:48
2.	"我不願讓你一個人"	Ashin & Guan You	I Won't Let You Be Lonely	4:26
3.	"星空"	Stone	Starry Sky	4:42
4.	"洗衣機"	Monster	Washing Machine	4:04
5.	"三個傻瓜"	Monster	Three Fools	4:16
6.	"歪腰"	Monster	Orz	3:10
7.	"乾杯"	Ashin	Cheers	4:49
8.	"倉頡"	Stone	Cang Jie	5:01
9.	"2012"	Ashin	2012	4:47
10.	"第二人生"	Monster	Second Life	4:28
11.	"諾亞方舟"	Masa	Noah's Ark	4:28
12.	"明日"	Masa	Now Here	5:40
13.	"OAOA（現在就是永遠）"	Ashin	Right Now is Eternity	4:43
14.	"T1213121 (Bonus Track)"	Mayday	T1213121 (Bonus Track)	2:09
Total length:				60:31

== Charts ==
=== Weekly charts ===
Chart (2011)	Peak position
Taiwanese Albums (G-Music)	1

== Sales and certifications ==
Region	Certification	Certified units/sales
Taiwan (RIT)	10× Platinum	128,754
