= The Servile (album) =

Studio album by No Party for Cao Dong
- Released: 19 February 2016
- Genres: Alternative rock; indie rock; grunge
- Length: 38:57
- Language: Mandarin
- Label: Shipi Co. Ltd
- Producer: Lee Hsiao-tzu

No Party for Cao Dong chronology
The Servile (2016)	The Clod (2023)

Singles from The Servile
- 1. "Simon Says" Released: 7 July 2015; 2. "Wayfarer" Released: 30 December 2015

The Servile (Chinese: 醜奴兒; pinyin: Chǒu Nú Er) is the debut studio album by Taiwanese indie rock band No Party for Cao Dong. It was released digitally via Bandcamp and The Orchard on 19 February 2016, followed by a physical release on 11 March.

Primarily grunge-based, the album also incorporates elements from post-rock, heavy metal, punk, math rock, emo, and EDM. Lyrically, The Servile touches on themes of social injustice, confusion, and hopelessness among Taiwanese youth about the future.

The Servile garnered instant acclaim and established No Party for Cao Dong as one of Taiwan's most prominent rock bands. In 2017, the album was nominated for three Golden Melody Awards for Album of the Year, Best Composer, and Best Lyrics, while it won two Golden Melody Awards for Best Band and Best New Artist.

== Background and recording ==
No Party for Cao Dong was formed in 2012 as "Caodong Street Party" by four schoolmates: Wood Lin, Judy Chan, Lee You, and Huang Shih-wei, changing the band name to "No Party for Cao Dong" soon afterwards. In 2014, the band uploaded their original tracks "Fifty", "Grisly Me", and "Old Zhang" on the internet, attracting attention within Taiwan's independent music scene.

In November 2015, the band applied for a "Hard Rock Band Album Recording Subsidy" (硬地樂團專輯錄製補助) of NT$300,000 from the Ministry of Culture, and began to collaborate with producer Lee Hsiao-tzu (李孝祖) in working on the development of their debut album. In December, No Party for Cao Dong announced the album's name: The Servile, which was taken from Song dynasty poet Xin Qiji's ci (詞), a poetic form, Chou Nu Er: Written on the Wall During My Travels in Boshan (醜奴兒·書博山道中壁). The album was mixed by engineer Andy Baker and mastered by Joel Hatstat.

During the recording process, the band encountered several creative challenges. Guitarist Judy Chan recalled spending significant time finding the right guitar tone, while vocalist Wood Lin struggled with perfectionism during the sessions. During mixing, the band actively participated in discussions with Baker and Lee, using reference recordings from other artists, including both Western and Taiwanese, to refine the sound and direction of each track.

== Track listing ==
All tracks are written by No Party for Cao Dong.

No.	Title	Length
1.	"Intro"	1:27
2.	"Grisly Me" (醜)	1:58
3.	"Wimpish" (爛泥)	2:30
4.	"The Reluctant" (勇敢的人)	3:41
5.	"Simon Says" (大風吹)	3:56
6.	"Emma" (艾瑪)	3:22
7.	"Await" (等)	2:36
8.	"The Specter" (鬼)	2:40
9.	"Am For You" (在)	4:40
10.	"Wayfarer" (山海)	4:11
11.	"Us" (我們)	3:39
12.	"Mottos, Bygones" (情歌)	4:17
Total length:		38:57
