= Born to Love (Mayday album) =

Studio album by Mayday
- Released: December 29, 2006
- Recorded: 2006
- Genre: Mandopop; rock
- Length: 49:51
- Language: Mandarin
- Label: Rock Records; B'in Music

Mayday chronology
Just My Pride Best of Album (2005)	Born to Love (2006)	Poetry of the Day After (2008)

Born to Love (Chinese: 為愛而生; pinyin: Wèi ài ér shēng) is the sixth studio album by Taiwanese rock band Mayday. It was released on December 29, 2006, by Rock Records and B'in Music. The album singles have spawned several music videos such as "Born To Love" (為愛而生), "Angel" (天使) and "Another First Love" (我又初戀了).

== Background and overview ==
During the preparations for the album, drummer Ming and guitarist Stone announced that their respective wives were pregnant, becoming the first members of the band to become fathers. Hence, the overall musical style and theme of the album was related to love and family. Ashin noted that the lyrics for "Angel" and "A Thousand Centuries" were specifically inspired by watching the two members going through the process of getting married and preparing for fatherhood.

The final track "Fetal Sounds" has no lyrics and features the members humming, the sounds of a heartbeat to represent Stone's then-unborn son, and the first cries of Ming's daughter, who was born two months before the album was released.

== Track listing ==
No.	Title	Lyrics	Music	Translation	Length
1.	"前傳 (Qian Zhuan) (Instrumental)"	Ashin	Ashin	Prologue	0.44
2.	"為愛而生 (Wei Ai Er Sheng)"	Ashin	Ashin	Born to Love	4:15
3.	"天使 (Tian Shi)"	Ashin	Monster	Angel	4:10
4.	"我又初戀了 (Wo You Chu Lian Le)"	Ashin	Monster	Another First Love	3:53
5.	"香水(Xiang Shui)"	Ashin	Ashin, Guan You	Perfume	4:37
6.	"摩托車日記 (Mo Tuo Che Ri Ji)"	Ashin	Monster	Motorcycle Diary	4:48
7.	"最重要的小事 (Zui Zhong Yao De Xiao Shi)"	Ashin	Masha	The Most Important Little Things	4:50
8.	"快樂很偉大 (Kuai Le Hen Wei Da)"	Ashin	Monster, Stone	Happiness is Grand	3:05
9.	"忘詞 (Wang Ci)"	Ashin	Ashin	Forgotten Words	4:12
10.	"寵上天 (Chong Shang Tian)"	Ashin	Stone	Offering to Heaven	4:30
11.	"米老鼠 (Mi Lao Shu)"	Ashin	Monster	Mickey Mouse	3:17
12.	"一千個世紀 (Yi Qian Ge Shi Ji)"	Ashin	Stone	A Thousand Centuries	5:02
13.	"胎音 (Tai Yin)"		Stone	Fetus Sounds	5:02

== Reception ==
"Tian Shi" won one of the Top 10 Songs of the Year at the 2008 HITO Radio Music Awards presented by Taiwanese radio station Hit FM. In 2021, it was adapted to bachata in Spanish by Dominican singer Luys Bien.

The album received a lukewarm reception from Taiwanese critics who saw its overall musical style as too stark a contrast from their past releases and was not nominated for any categories during the 18th Golden Melody Awards. Some of the songs, especially "Angel", became popular in mainland China and have since been retrospectively dubbed masterpieces.

== Charts ==
=== Weekly charts ===
Chart (2007)	Peak position
Taiwanese Albums (G-Music)	1

== Sales ==
Region	Certification	Certified units/sales
Taiwan	—	200,000
