= Recording Industry Foundation in Taiwan =

Organization representing the interests of the music industry in Taiwan

- 財團法人台灣唱片出版事業基金會
- Abbreviation: RIT
- Nickname: IFPI Taiwan
- Formation: July 1, 1986; 39 years ago
- Location: Taipei, Taiwan
- Region served: Taiwan
- Website: www.rit.org.tw
- Formerly called: IFPI Members Foundation in Taiwan

Recording Industry Foundation in Taiwan (Chinese: 財團法人台灣唱片出版事業基金會, RIT), also known as IFPI Taiwan, formerly IFPI Members Foundation in Taiwan (Chinese: 財團法人國際唱片業交流基金會), is the organization that represents the interests of the music industry in Taiwan, and a member of the International Federation of the Phonographic Industry (IFPI).

== History ==
The idea of establishing an IFPI branch in Taiwan was presented in a meeting of 200 representatives of the recording industry, government officials, and the communication industry in February 1986. This led to the organization of 11 domestic record companies in May of that year, and the official establishment of the IFPI Members Foundation in Taiwan on July 1, 1986, widely known by the name IFPI Taiwan. In August 1988, the National Library of Taiwan commissioned IFPI Taiwan with managing ISRC codes in Taiwan, which was assigned the "TW" country code. In November 2008, the organization was renamed as Recording Industry Foundation in Taiwan (RIT).

== Charts ==
RIT launched the IFPI Taiwan Charts in August 1996 including weekly charts for "Local Top 20", "International Top 10" and "Single Top 10". The charts had their own World Wide Web site, a notable fact for the time. The ranking was based on a random sample of 60 reporting outlets ranking their top-selling titles, a methodology which was challenged by senior label executives as being easy to manipulate. Charts were published for 1997, 1998 and 1999, until they were canceled in August 1999. The reason given for cancellation was that due to the market share of music piracy, the "Chart has not been able to tell the real market situation." The last chart published was on 26 August 1999 (week 32).

== Certifications and awards ==
=== Sales certificates ===
RIT has started providing music recording sales certification in August 1996, at the same time that IFPI Taiwan Charts were established. Since 2011, the certification can be based on either the number of physical units sold, or on the market value sold, including digital sales, where albums and singles are assigned their wholesale value (NT$300 per album and NT$100 per single). The levels for certification are:

Certification thresholds
Award	Gold		Platinum	
Award	Volume	Market value	Volume	Market value
Local albums	15,000	NT$4,500,000	30,000	NT$9,000,000
International albums	5,000	NT$1,500,000	10,000	NT$3,000,000
Singles	5,000	NT$500,000	10,000	NT$1,000,000

Prior to 2011, certification was based on physical units sold:

Certification thresholds prior to 2011
Period	Local albums		International albums		Singles	
Period	Gold	Platinum	Gold	Platinum	Gold	Platinum
August 1996 – February 2002	100,000	200,000	25,000	50,000	25,000	50,000
March 2002 – December 2005	50,000	100,000	15,000	30,000	10,000	20,000
January 2006 – October 2007	35,000	70,000	10,000	20,000	10,000	20,000
November 2007 – December 2008	20,000	40,000	7,000	14,000	7,000	14,000
January 2009 – December 2010	15,000	30,000	5,000	10,000	5,000	10,000

RIT provides an archive of all past certifications, but no new certifications were published since 2012, the last certification being for Mayday's Second Round which was certified 10× Platinum for sales of 128,754 units and NT$56,158,622. The highest certification awarded was 21× Platinum, awarded to James Horner's Titanic: Music from the Motion Picture.

=== Golden Melody Awards ===
The Golden Melody Awards is an honor awarded by the Ministry of Culture of Taiwan to recognize outstanding achievement in the Mandarin, Taiwanese, Hakka, and Formosan-languages popular and traditional music industry. It is co-organized by RIT since its inception in 1990.

=== Hong Kong Asian-Pop Music Festival ===
RIT is one of the participants and co-organizers of the Hong Kong Asian-Pop Music Festival (HKAMF) since its inception in 2011, RIT is the organization recommending the Taiwanese participant in the "Asian Next Super Nova Competition".

== See also ==
- List of best-selling albums in Taiwan
- List of music recording certifications
