= History of Tomorrow =

Studio album by Mayday
- Released: July 21, 2016
- Recorded: 2016
- Genre: Mandopop; rock
- Length: 56:35
- Language: Mandarin
- Label: B'in Music

Mayday chronology
The Second Round (2011)	History of Tomorrow (2016)

Singles from History of Tomorrow
- 1. "Party Animal" Released: May 20, 2016

History of Tomorrow (Chinese: 自傳; pinyin: Zìzhuàn; lit. 'Autobiography') is the ninth studio album by Taiwanese rock band Mayday. It marks their first studio album in five years since Second Round (2011). The first single, "Party Animal", was released on May 20, 2016. The album was released under B'in Music on July 21, 2016.

== Background and overview ==
The Mandarin name of the album means "autobiography" and was released just prior to the 20th anniversary of their debut. Although their past discography has featured songs that were inspired by their personal experiences, this album was more personal and directly referred to the band's journey and the individual members' backgrounds in both the lyrics and the music videos. Billboard described the album as "a sonic repository of the band’s career featuring songs that detail the passage of time, love, and life based on the experiences of the five members".

== Promotion ==
=== Tour ===
They first announced plans to tour and dates for the Asia leg of the tour on their New Year's Eve concert in Taipei, Taiwan. The tour started on March 18, 2017, in Kaohsiung, Taiwan. Further dates for North America, Europe and Australia were later announced.

== Track listing ==
History of Tomorrow – Standard edition
No.	Title	Lyrics	Music	Length
1.	"如果我們不曾相遇" ("What If We Had Never Met")	Ashin	Ashin	3:16
2.	"成名在望" ("Almost Famous")	Ashin	Ashin	5:08
3.	"好好(想把你寫成一首歌)" ("Song About You")	Ashin	Ming; Ashin	3:19
4.	"兄弟" ("Brotherhood")	Ashin	Ashin	4:09
5.	"人生有限公司" ("Life Co. Ltd.")	Ashin	Monster	3:38
6.	"後來的我們" ("Here, After, Us")	Ashin	Monster	5:46
7.	"頑固" ("Tough")	Ashin	Ashin	4:24
8.	"派對動物" ("Party Animal")	Ashin	Ashin	4:43
9.	"最好的一天" ("Best Day of My Life")	Ashin	Stone	4:03
10.	"少年他的奇幻漂流" ("Life of Planet")	Ashin	Stone	4:36
11.	"終於結束的起點" ("Beginning of the End")	Ashin	Ashin	5:07
12.	"任意門" ("Dokodemo Door")	Ashin	Monster	4:33
13.	"轉眼" ("Final Chapter")	Ashin	Stone	6:07
14.	"What's Your Story (Bonus Track)" (No sound)			0:19
15.	"你說那 C 和弦就是... (Bonus Track)" ("Do Mi So")	Ashin; Masa	Masa	2:17
Total length:				61:25

== Release and reception ==
The album was available for pre-order beginning on May 25, 2016. The album was officially released on July 21. The album was later released in Japan on February 1, 2017, which includes Japanese versions of two songs from the album and two previously released Japanese singles.

The album was critically acclaimed, earning the band eight nominations at the 28th Golden Melody Awards.

== Charts ==
=== Weekly charts ===
Chart (2017)	Peak position
Japanese Albums (Oricon)	14

== Sales ==
Region	Certification	Certified units/sales
Taiwan	—	100,000
