= Monster (musician) =

Taiwanese musician (born 1976)

- 溫尚翊
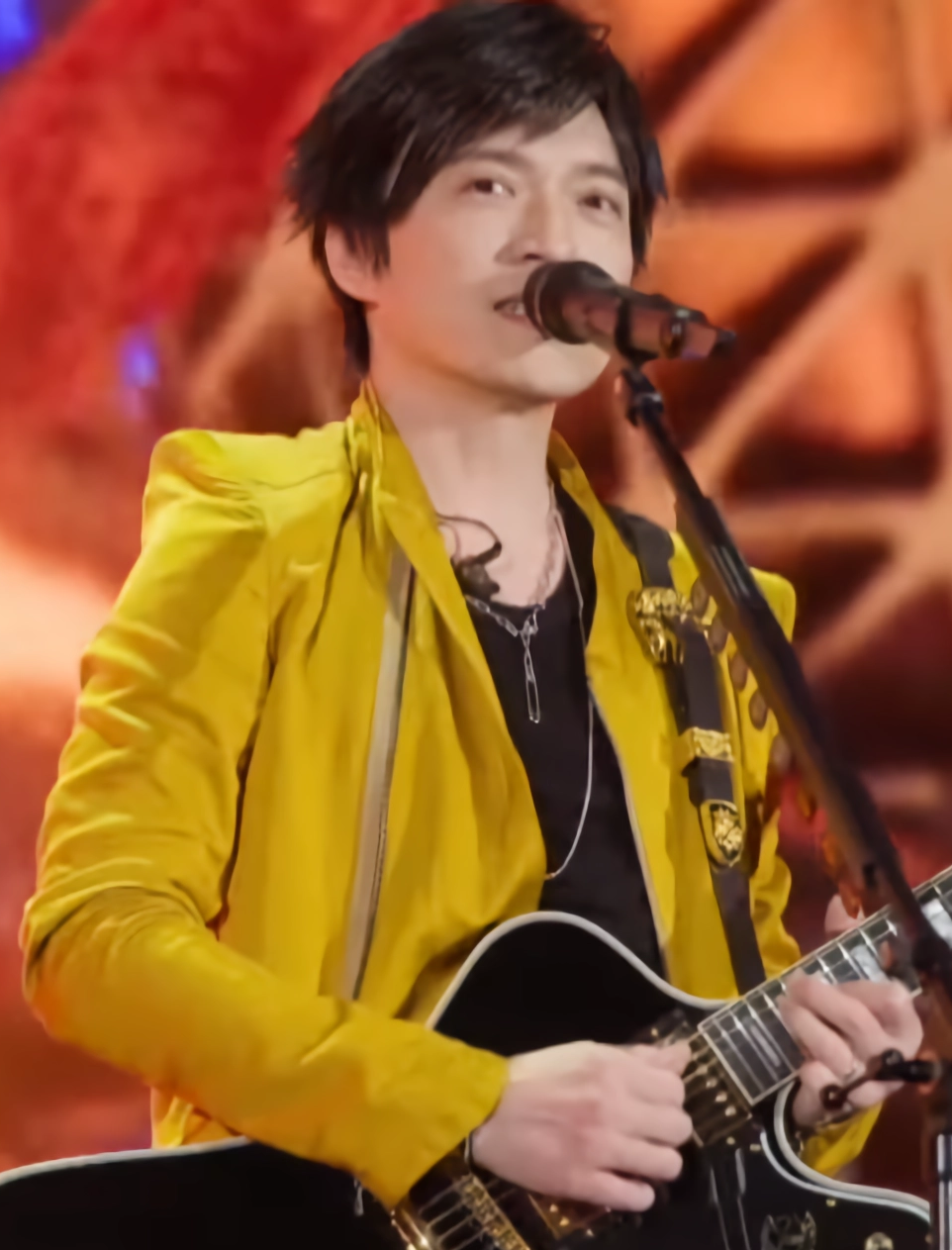
- Monster performing in 2023
- Born: Wen Shang-yi; 28 November 1976 (age 49); Hsinchu County, Taiwan
- Education: National Taiwan University
- Occupations: Singer; songwriter; designer
- Years active: 1999–present
- Musical career
- Genres: Mandopop; rock
- Instruments: Guitar; vocals
- Labels: Rock; B'in Music
- Member of: Mayday

Chinese name
- Traditional Chinese: 溫尚翊
- Simplified Chinese: 温尚翊
Transcriptions
Standard Mandarin
- Hanyu Pinyin: Wēn Shàngyì
Southern Min
- Hokkien POJ: Un Siōng-e̍k

Wen Shang-yi (Chinese: 溫尚翊; pinyin: Wēn Shàngyì; Pe̍h-ōe-jī: Un Siōng-e̍k; born 28 November 1976), known by his stage name Monster, is a Taiwanese singer, songwriter, and musician. He is the leader of the rock band Mayday and one of its two guitarists.

== Early life and education ==
Wen developed an interest in music and the guitar when he was as a student at the Affiliated Senior High School of National Taiwan Normal University, where he became the vice-president of a guitar society and also met Mayday members Ashin, Stone, and Masa. After graduating as the valedictorian of his high school class, he attended National Taiwan University, where he became a classmate of future legislator Su Chiao-hui. As an undergraduate, he became the president of its rock and roll club.

== Career ==
As a guitarist, he has also dabbled in album production, producing albums for Fish Leong, Della Ding, Alien Huang, Energy, Victor Wong, Jia Jia, Maggie Chiang, Fahrenheit, Jing Chang, Xiao Bing Chih and others. He also composed songs for many singers such as Jam Hsiao, Richie Jen and Stefanie Sun.

== Accolades ==
Monster was given his own Signature Model Les Paul from Gibson in 2014. He was added to the Gibson signature artist club as the second guitarist from Asia. Monster's admired guitarist is Matsumoto Takahiro, who are the leader and guitarist of the Japanese band B'z.
