= GDJYB =

Hong Kong indie band

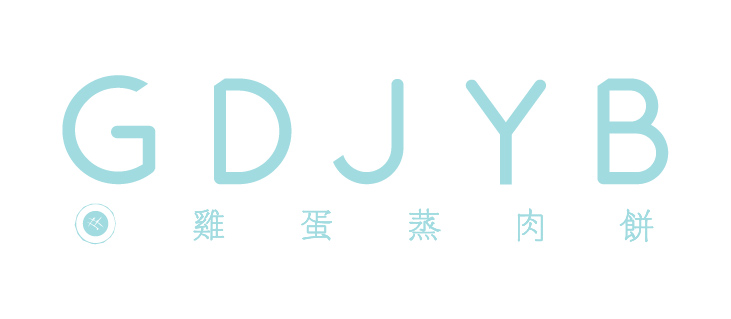

Background information
- Also known as: 雞蛋蒸肉餅
- Origin: Hong Kong
- Genres: indie rock; math rock; rock
- Years active: 2012–present
- Label: N/A
- Members: Soft Liu (vocals, guitar); Soni Cheng (guitar); Wing Chan (bass); Heihei Ng (drums)
- Past members: YY Wong (bass)

GDJYB (Chinese: 雞蛋蒸肉餅) is a 4-piece indie band based in Hong Kong. Its name originates from an abbreviation of the Chinese dish of steamed meatloaf with egg. The band first consisted of vocalist and guitarist Soft Liu, guitarist Soni Cheng, bassist YY Wong, and drummer Heihei Ng. In 2017, YY Wong left the band and was replaced by Wing Chan.

The band describes their style as "math/folk rock". Singing in Honglish and in Mandarin, they have written songs with topics ranging from daily happenings to social issues.

The band's song "Burn It Down" brings forth the struggle between religious and LGBT-oriented parties. On the other hand, "Durian What What What" describes the political situation in Hong Kong after the Umbrella Revolution in 2014.

GDJYB released their first full album 23:59 Before Tomorrow in early 2017 in both Hong Kong and Taiwan, consisting of 11 new songs including hit singles such as "Durian What What What" and "Burn it Down".

In 2018, they released the EP Squarecle. It features the song "Sunrise" (日曰), written in collaboration with Taiwanese band Elephant Gym as a complement to their song "Moonset" (月落).

In 2021, Liu and Cheng moved from Hong Kong to Taiwan, and started their own band named Running Youth.

In December 2025, they released a new album by the name of Project 2222. (Note: Stylised as <=P:r0J3CT 2222/>)

== Discography ==
Debut EP -《GDJYB 雞蛋蒸肉餅》 (Published September 2014)

Track No.	Track name
01	Intro
02	Double Nono
03	Philip the Buster
04	Not My Name
05	Where It Goes
06	You Just Ran Away
07	Bubble

Debut album – 《23:59 Before Tomorrow》(Published January 2017 in Hong Kong and Taiwan)

Track No.	Track name
01	Whatever
02	Time in My Galaxy – Feat. Jan Curious@Chochukmo
03	Burn It Down
04	That Day I Went to His Funeral
05	迷惑 Temptation
06	逃亡吧，少年呀！ Run! Teens Run!
07	Can't You Tell Why?
08	榴槤乜乜乜 Durian What What What
09	The Loving Mothers
10	Street Fighters
11	Why Do You Look Back

Singles -《GDJYB 雞蛋蒸肉餅》

Date of Release.	Track name
Oct 2017	Backspace
Feb 2018	Why Don't You Kill Us All?

== Performances ==
Past Performances

Music Festivals
2018
• Stepping Stones Music Festival, Korea
• HUSH! Music Festival, Macau
• Chun You Festival, China
• Synchronicity Festival, Japan
• Noise Pop Festival, United States

2017
• Iceland Airwaves Music Festival, Iceland
• East Sea Music Festival, China
• YouTube Fans Festival 2017, Hong Kong
• Wow & Flutters 2017, Hong Kong
• Ho-Hai-Yan Gongliao Music Festival 2017, Taiwan
• Megaport Festival, Taiwan
• DongTaiDu Music Festival, Kuala Lumpur, Malaysia

2016
• Clockenflap, Hong Kong
• Gwangju Sound Park Festival, Korea
• Adelaide OzAsia Festival, Australia
• Music Matters, Singapore
• Laneway Festival, Singapore
• Love Love Rock Music Festival, Taiwan
• Spirit Fest Xian, China
• Wow & Flutters, Hong Kong
• San Miguel Beer Festival, Hong Kong
• Silvermine Bay Festival, Hong Kong

2015
• Midi Festival Shenzhen, China
• Wake Up Festival, Taiwan
• Grasscamp, Hong Kong
• San Miguel Beer Festival, Hong Kong

2014
• Clockenflap, Hong Kong

2013
• Silvermine Bay Festival, Hong Kong

Oversea Gigs
2018
• Sofar Sounds San Francisco, USA

2017
• GDJYB《23:59 Before Tomorrow》Album Release Concert, Taipei, Taiwan
• Mini Gig at Maison the Core, Tainan, Taiwan
• The Sound of Islands, Penang, Malaysia
• Roar Music: Singapore x Hong Kong Collaboration, Singapore

2016
• Her Tour @Taipei Legacy, Taiwan
• Live Wild GZ x GDJYB, Guangzhou, China
• You Are Tropical @CJ azit, Seoul, Korea

2015
• GDJYB《台北⼩雞蛋演唱會》Mini Concert, Taipei, Taiwan

Opening Guests
2016
• Supper Moment溫柔⾰命Concert, HKCEC
• Qu Live in Hong Kong, Hidden Agenda

2015
• HOCC Reimagine Live in Macpherson Woods
• Orangegrass (橙草樂團)《烏鴉》HK Live
• "tricot HIP STEP ""A N D"" JUMP Asia Trip Live in Hong Kong"
‧ ⼩福氣《福氣吃雞蛋》⾹港⾸演

Brand events
2017
• 大家樂壇
2016
• Levi's x Moov live music show
• I.T. X HMV music night
• FWD Music Force

2015
• House of Vans 2015
• Agnès B Rue de Marseille Live 3rd GIG
• FWD投⼊⾳樂 盡情玩樂, Isquare HK

School shows
2017
• 粉嶺禮賢會中學Talent Show
• CU Music Sharing, Chinese University of Hong Kong

2016
• HSMC Music Society 2nd Annual Performance

2015
• Sunset Concert, The Hong Kong Academy for Performing Arts
• Renaissance Festival, Hong Kong Baptist University
• Talent Quest, Polytechnic University Student Halls
• Polymuso Mini Band Show, Hong Kong Polytechnic University
• Loud N Raw Band Show, CUHK Shaw Band

2014
• UC Band Society Grass Show 2014
‧ 離地四⼩時⾳樂會, Hong Kong Baptist University Students' Union

Others
2017
• Stage Hungry! 2nd Meal
• Southern District Beach Carnival 2017
• 燃燒吧我們的小宇宙
2016
• M+ Summer Camp
• RTHK Goodshow 31
• West Kowloon Freespace
• Slide The City 2016

2015
• Pinkdot 2015
‧ ⿈耀明呈獻：⽂藝復興⼥流之⾳樂會
• Reimagine Live@Hidden Agenda with HOCC
• Time Out Hong Kong x K11 (Supper Moment x Chochukmo x GDJYB)
• Times Square Music Room Finale 2015
• Fullcupmusic x GDJYB 2015
• ""INDIE IS DEAD?"" Charity show for Hidden Agenda"
• "Underground ""Girls with Guitars #7"", Orange Peel"
• Warehouse Music Gig, Warehouse Teenage Club
• Lost on 15, Blindspot Gallery & Clockenflap

2014
• Le French May – MUSIC ON THE TRAM, Alliance Française de HK
• GDJYB X Silhungmo x New Youth Barber Shop, Hidden Agenda
• Time Out's Big Night Out (Eman Lam, GDJYB & Yukilovey)
• POPO 10th Anniversary Concert, PMQ

Media Coverage
|Newspaper & Magazine|
• Apple Daily news-in-motion
• NMG Plus
• East Touch HK
• Today (SG)
• Be Asia
• Time Out Hk (2015)
• Mingpao Daily
• Apple Daily HK
• Economic Journal
• U Magazine
• SCMP
• HK Magazine
• Face magazine issue 392
• City Magazine 號外
• Time Out HK

|Radio & TV|
• Roadshow
• RTHK 視點31
• RTHK The Works
• RTHK2 《騷動⾳樂》
• CRHK 903 《咆哮⼭莊》、《叱咤樂壇》、《集雜誌》
• CRHK 881 《有誰共鳴》
• DBC 《8910 Good Morning》、《C⼈薦》
• 鳳凰U Radio 《今夜不安婧》

|Online Media|
• Who Are Invited
• Initium Media
• Blow music (Taiwan)
• KK Box (Taiwan)
• Inmedia
• Stand News ⽴場新聞
• Kochipan (France)
• Bitetone
