= G-Music =

Music store of Taiwan

Rose Tachung Records 玫瑰大眾唱片
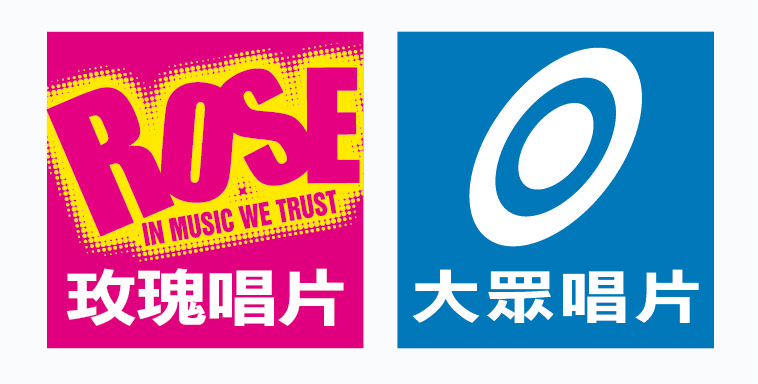
- Logo of Rose Records and Tachung Records
- Type: Music retailer
- Industry: Records; retail
- Headquarters: Taiwan, Zhongzheng District, South Chongqing Road 1-duan 15, 9F,
- Products: Audio-visual
- Website: Company website (Chinese)

G-Music Limited is a company built in 2002 by Rose Records and Tachung Records, the largest local music retails and wholesale chains in Taiwan. The physical retail arms have been kept separate, mainly for different customer bases and brand identity, but the e-retailing, wholesale and distributor business is unified as Rose Tachung Records.

The two chains originally teamed up to create Taiwan's popular music ranking, the G-Music Chart (Chinese: 風雲榜 fēngyúnbǎng). The chains had around 60 locations in 2002. Tachung's network includes Taiwan's only remaining specialist classical CD store, opposite the Taipei YMCA on Hsu Chang St. G-Music Chart remains the most popular record chart in Taiwan.

== G-Music Chart ==
The G-Music Chart was first officially published on July 7, 2005, and compiled the top physically sold CD releases in Taiwan (including both albums and physically released singles). Only the top 20 positions are published, and instead of sales, a percentage ranking is listed next to each release. For example, in the 52nd week of 2006, Born to Love, ranked at number one, sold 25.46% of the CDs sold in Taiwan that week. G-Music's main chart, Combo Chart (Chinese: 綜合榜 zònghé bǎng), ranks all music sales, regardless of language, country of origin or genre. The Combo Chart was discontinued in early 2015.

=== Sub-charts ===
In addition to the main chart, there are eight sub-charts, and one defunct chart. All charts feature a percentage ranking, which is the percentage sold for each subcategory. All charts began on the same day as the Combo Chart, July 7, 2005. The currently operating sub-charts are:

- Mandarin Chart (Chinese: 華語榜 Huáyǔ bǎng) ranks releases in Chinese language.
- Western Chart (Chinese: 西洋榜 Xīyáng bǎng) ranks predominantly English releases from North America, Europe or other Western countries.
- J-pop Chart (Chinese: 東洋榜 Dōngyáng bǎng, "East Asian Chart") ranks non-Chinese Asian language albums. Originally named for Japanese releases, the chart increasingly features musicians singing in Korean.
- Jazz Chart (Chinese: 爵士榜 Juéshì bǎng) ranks jazz releases, regardless of nationality or language.
- Classical Chart (Chinese: 古典榜 Gǔdiǎn bǎng) ranks classical music releases, regardless of nationality or language.
- Audio/Video Chart (Chinese: 影音榜 Yǐngyīn bǎng) ranks music-related DVD and Blu-ray releases, regardless of nationality, language or genre.
- International Chart (Chinese: 外語榜 Wàiyǔ bǎng) combines the Western Chart and J-pop Chart together.

In addition to these, a Taiwanese singles chart called the Top Chinese Chart (Chinese: 百事榜 Bǎishì bǎng, "Pepsi Chart"), also called the "Mengniu Dairy Chart" (蒙牛榜 Méngniú bǎng), was created at the start of 2006. It ranked the top songs in two different top 20 charts: one for Mainland China (内地榜單 Nèidì bǎngdān) and one combining Hong Kong and Taiwan (港臺榜單 Gǎng-tái bǎngdān). The chart was made defunct in September 2008.
