= Mayday (Taiwanese band) =

Taiwanese rock band

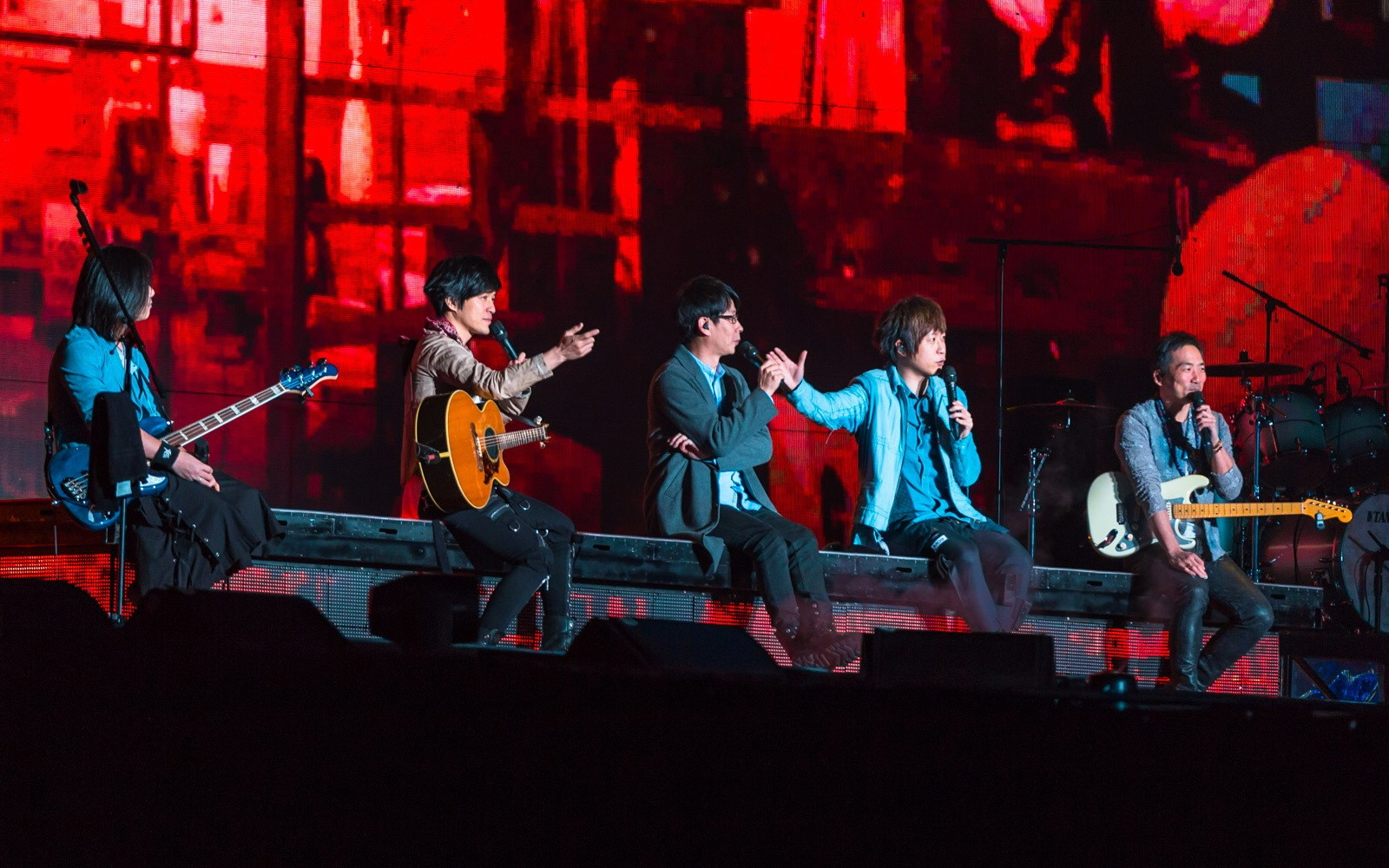
- Mayday in 2018; From L–R: Masa, Monster, Ming, Ashin and Stone

Background information
- Origin: Taipei, Taiwan
- Genres: Rock; pop
- Years active: 1997–present
- Labels: Rock Records; B'in Music; A-Sketch
- Members: Monster; Ashin; Stone; Masa; Ming

Mayday (Chinese: 五月天; pinyin: Wǔyuètiān; Pe̍h-ōe-jī: Gō͘-goe̍h-thiⁿ; lit. 'Day in May') is a Taiwanese rock band founded in 1997, consisting of members Monster, Ashin, Stone, Masa, and Ming. Nicknamed "the Beatles of the Chinese-speaking world", Mayday has won many awards during their career, including the Golden Melody Award for Best Band, an award given by the Taiwanese Ministry of Culture, in 2001, 2004, 2009 and 2012. Their albums Born to Love (2006), Poetry of the Day After (2008), and Second Round (2011) all hit number 1 in Taiwan, with the latter reaching 10× Platinum certification. Their Life Tour from 2017 to 2019 is one of the most-attended concert tours of all time, with 4.15 million attendees.

== Career ==
=== 1995–1997: SoBand and formation of Mayday ===
In 1995, Chen Hsin-hung (Ashin), guitarist Wen Shang-yi (Monster), and drummer Chien You-ta (錢佑達) formed a band. They later recruited bass player Tsai Sheng-yen (Masa) and guitarist Shih Chin-hang (Stone). They were first called So Band. The members had first met as schoolmates and members of the guitar club at the Affiliated Senior High School of National Taiwan Normal University (師大附中) and had gone to different universities after graduation. They performed in pubs and eateries and were also actively involved in promoting the growing rock music trend in Taiwan. In 1997, the band registered to perform at the Formoz Festival (野臺開唱) under the name "Mayday", which was Masa's online username.

=== 1997–1999: Mayday's First Album ===
Shortly after participating in the Formoz Festival, the band began to actively send demo tapes to various record companies in the hope of sealing a record deal. Their demo impressed Rock Records executive Jonathan Lee (李宗盛) who described them as "the ones who would usher in the sound of the future". As a result, they signed their first record deal with Rock Records in 1998.

That same year, Mayday took part in the release of the Taiwan Independent Compilation Album (ㄞ國歌曲) by indie music label TCM (角頭音樂) which included their first studio recording Motor Rock (軋車). In June 1998, they also released Embrace (擁抱) compilation album for which they took on most of the songwriting, production, and recording duties. To gain further experience, they accompanied their labelmate Richie Jen during his performances and frequently performed at various universities and colleges.

In 1999, Mayday's original drummer left, as did their next two drummers Chen Yung-chang (陳泳錩) and Robert (任柏璋) (formerly of LTK Commune). In 1999, Liu Yen-ming (Ming) (Note: His English stage name "Ming" was based on his previous legal name Liu Yen-ming (劉諺明), which he changed to Kuan-yu in 2004.), then known as the drummer of disbanded indie jazz fusion band Why Not, agreed to join Mayday permanently; he had been acquainted with the Mayday members as they rented his music studio for their rehearsals.

Mayday released their first full-length studio album titled Mayday's First Album (第一張創作專輯) under Rock Records on 7 July 1999. The album received critical acclaim and they gained a following in Taiwan. The album went on to sell more than 300,000 copies. Not long after, on 28 August 1999, Mayday held their first large-scale concert titled 168th Concert at the Taipei Municipal Stadium.

=== 1999–2001: Viva Love and People Life, Ocean Wild ===
The band's second album Viva Love (愛情萬歲) was released on 7 July 2000. Sales of Viva Love exceeded their previous album, selling more than 350,000 copies. Additionally, Viva Love won them the "Best Band" award at the 12th Golden Melody Awards (十二屆金曲獎最佳樂團獎). Between 12 and 26 August 2000, Mayday held three concerts of their Stand Out tour in Taipei City, Changhua County, and Kaohsiung City in Taiwan.

In 2001, Mayday dabbled in film music by composing and recording the theme song and score of Migratory Bird (候鳥) which starred Rene Liu and Huang Pin Yuan. Two months later, Mayday released their third album People Life, Ocean Wild (人生海海), sales of which hit more than 350,000 copies after just a month. From 18 August to 1 September 2001, Mayday held their first ticketed tour Where are you going (你要去哪裡) in Taipei City, Kaohsiung City, and Changhua County in Taiwan, as well as in Singapore. It was considered a "farewell tour" due to the members' upcoming enlistments for compulsory military service. Monster, Ashin, and Masa reported to basic military training in November. Stone was granted an exemption due to congenital heart arrhythmia while Ming had completed his military service after graduating from high school.

=== 2003–2013: Return to the music scene and further albums ===
During their hiatus, Mayday released the autobiographical documentary The Wings of Dream (搖滾本事) as well as an accompanying movie soundtrack. On 16 August 2003, Mayday regrouped and held their Castle in the Sky concert at the Taipei Municipal Stadium, attracting over 40,000 fans. This officially marked their return to the music scene. On 11 November 2003, the band released their fourth studio album Time Machine (時光機)

In 2004, Mayday produced their third movie soundtrack, this time for the movie Love of May. Stone also acted in the movie. On 5 November 2004, Mayday released their fifth studio album God's Children are All Dancing (神的孩子都在跳舞), and were nominated for Best Band at the 16th Golden Melody Awards in 2005. The band embarked on their first-ever world tour Final Home from 25 December 2004 to 1 May 2005, holding a total of 14 concerts in Taiwan, the United States, China, Singapore, Malaysia, Japan, and Hong Kong.

In 2006, Mayday left Rock Records to set up their own record label, B'in Music (相信音樂), with Rock Records executives Chen Yongzhi and Xie Zhifen. On 29 December 2006, they released their sixth studio album Born to Love (為愛而生), and held 12 concerts in the first quarter of 2007. They kicked off their world tour Jump! The World (離開地球表面) in Hong Kong, holding 23 concerts in the span of two years.

On 23 October 2008, Mayday released their seventh studio album, Poetry of the Day After (後青春期的詩). On 19 March 2009, Mayday announced their DNA World Tour, holding a total of 44 concerts over two years. The Kaohsiung concert stop was held on 5 December 2009 at the National Stadium (Kaohsiung) with 55,555 attendees, breaking the record for the concert with most attendees in Taiwan previously held by Michael Jackson.

From 20 to 23 May 2011, Mayday held four concerts of their Just Rock It!!! World Tour. On 16 September, Mayday released their 3D film, 3DNA. The film, costing NT$220 million to produce, was the first ever concert film to be produced in 3D in the Mandarin-speaking music industry and the first by a Taiwanese artist. Ticket sales totaled close to NT$200 million.

On 16 December 2011, Mayday released their eighth studio album, Second Round (第二人生). The album was highly anticipated, with preorders totaling 129,958 in one week. Two versions of the album were released, with different covers and song sequences. In 2012 the album was certified 10× Platinum by the Recording Industry Foundation in Taiwan (RIT) for sales of 128,754 units and NT$56,158,622, which is, as of 2021, the last such certification awarded by RIT. Mayday embarked on their Nowhere World Tour (諾亞方舟) on 23 December 2011, playing 7 consecutive concerts in the Taipei Arena. They played a total of 82 concerts as part of their NOW-HERE world tour, including two consecutive concerts in the Beijing Bird's Nest (北京鳥巢) in 2012, which attracted 200,000 fans. On 3 March 2012, they held their Just Love It! I Won't Let You Be Alone charity concert to raise funds for the underprivileged.

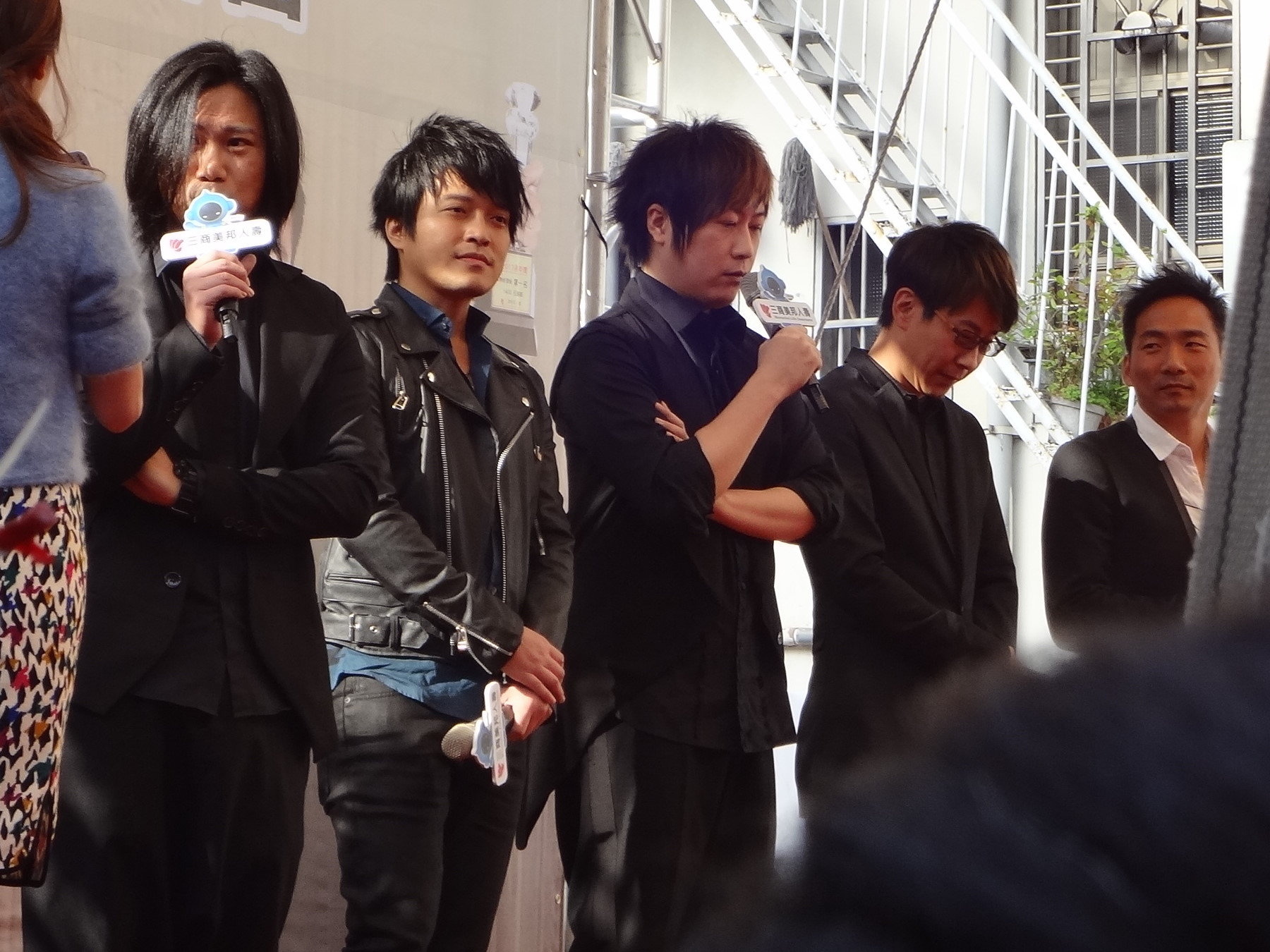
Mayday in 2013

Mayday earned another award for Best Music Video at the 24th Golden Melody Awards for the song "Cheers" (乾杯) from their album Second Round (第二人生). In July 2013, they held six charity concerts, donating a total of NT$27 million to charity. As part of their NOW-HERE world tour, they performed at the Los Angeles Memorial Sports Arena on 2 February and held eight consecutive concerts at the Hong Kong Coliseum in May. On 17 August 2013, Mayday returned to the Beijing Bird's Nest. Mayday also entered the Japanese music industry, as they then joined record label Amuse. On 13 November, Mayday officially released their first Japanese compilation. The band also held twp concerts in Osaka and Tokyo at the start of 2014.

On 18 September 2013, the band released their second 3D concert film, Mayday Nowhere (5月天諾亞方舟). It was also the world's first 4DX concert film. On 30 December, the band released their third compilation, The Best of 1999–2013.

=== 2014–2016: North American Tour, Nippon Budokan ===
As part of their NOW-HERE world tour, Mayday performed at the Korea International Exhibition Center in Seoul, South Korea, on 8 February 2014. On 21 February 2014, they held the first concert of their European tour at the Wembley Arena in London, attracting more than 10,000 fans from Taiwan, China, Hong Kong, and Europe. They also performed in Paris at the Zénith Paris on 23 February and in the Netherlands at the Amsterdam Heineken Music Hall on 26 February. As part of their NOW-HERE North American Tour, the band held seven concerts in Canada and the US from 17 to 29 March, in cities such as Vancouver, Toronto, Chicago, Houston, San Jose, and Los Angeles. Notably, the band performed at Madison Square Garden in New York on 22 March, becoming the first Mandarin-language band to perform at the venue. The final show of the NOW-HERE world tour was held in Los Angeles on 29 March.

On 27 July, Mayday started another series of Just Love It! charity concerts, with the first Just Love It! Embrace charity concert held at the Kaohsiung Arena, followed by 3 August in Beijing, 5 August in Shenzhen, and 8 August in Yilan. All proceeds were donated to charity. On 31 December, Mayday held their Campfire concert at the Kaoshiung National Stadium, counting down to 2015 with their fans. They performed two more concerts at the same venue on 2 and 3 January 2015. On 1 January 2015, Mayday, together with artists from their record label B'in Music, held a New Year's concert at the intersection of Kaixuan and Ersheng Road, the site of the tragic 2014 Kaohsiung gas explosions.

On 29 March 2015, the anniversary of the band's formation, Mayday announced that they would be bringing their Just Rock It!!! World Tour to Nippon Budokan with two shows on 28 and 29 August 2015, making their mark as the first Mandarin-speaking band to hold a concert at the venue. On 17 June 2015, Mayday also released their second Japanese single, "YOUR LEGEND ~Moyuru Inochi~", On 26 June 2015, Mayday released 'Her Story', an album which invited ten female singers and their creative teams to remake Mayday songs into their signature styles, with an underlying concept of womanhood. In August 2015, the band announced that they would be stopping all public activities for six to twelve months in preparation for their new album.

From 20 May to 1 June 2016, Mayday held ten consecutive concerts at the Hong Kong Coliseum as part of their Just Rock It!!! World Tour. On 17 July, Mayday returned to where they first performed after releasing their first album in 1999, Ximending in Taipei City, for a free live concert. On 21 July, Mayday officially released their ninth studio album, History of Tomorrow. The track, "Here, After Us", is one of the most-viewed Chinese music videos on YouTube.

=== 2017–2018: Life world tour and 20th anniversary ===
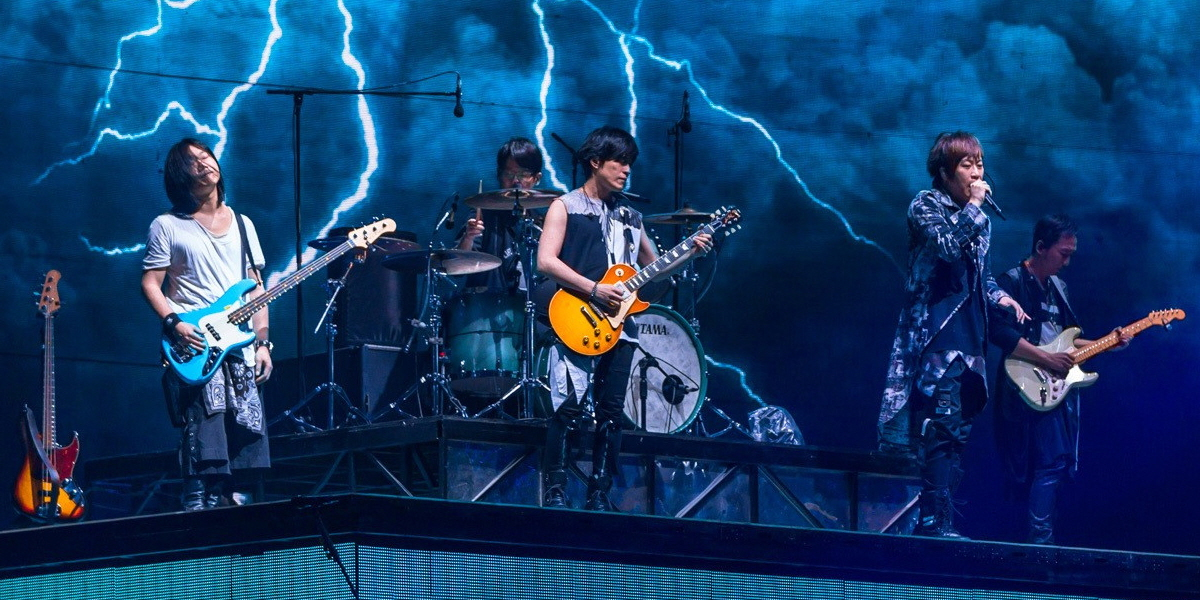
Mayday performing in 2018

At the 28th Golden Melody Awards, Mayday was nominated for seven awards, including Best Band, Best Composer, and Song of the Year. In the end, the band took away awards for Best Mandarin Album and Best Lyricist (Ashin). Mayday's Life world tour, the band's tenth large-scale concert tour, kicked off on 18 March 2017 with four consecutive shows at the Kaohsiung National Stadium, drawing a crowd of over 200,000 fans. On 29 March 2017, Mayday celebrated their 20th anniversary with a free outdoor concert in Taipei and a worldwide livestream of the show. Over 35,000 fans were in attendance, while millions more watched a free livestream of the concert. The tour began in Hong Kong and China before continuing to Southeast Asia, North America, and returning to East Asia. The fourth leg of the Life tour brought the band to Europe, where they held two shows, before further dates in East Asia.

On 5 May 2018, they released a single named "I Will Carry You", a theme song for Android game, Honor of Kings. Leg 6 of the tour brought Mayday to Oceania, where they performed three shows in Melbourne, Sydney, and Auckland in September 2018. On 6 October 2018, the band performed in Bangkok, Thailand for the first time. The final leg of the tour brought them back to Taiwan, where they held ten consecutive shows at the Taichung Intercontinental Baseball Stadium in Taichung, Taiwan to round up the tour. The Life world tour visited 55 cities and comprised a total of 122 shows. It is the largest tour the band has held to date, attracting more than 4.15 million attendees. The tour grossed around USD$333 million. The 3D concert film Mayday LiFE was released on 24 May 2019. It comprised scenes from the 122 concerts of the Life world tour, and was the third 3D concert film by the band thus far.

=== 2020–2023: Pandemic era ===
On 6 January 2020, Mayday announced that they would be bringing their Just Rock It!!! Blue tour to Singapore on 30 August 2020. However, in light of the COVID-19 pandemic, the concert was rescheduled twice, first to 27 February 2021 and then to 4 September 2021. It was then announced the show would be replaced with the latest tour Mayday Fly to 2022 Live in Singapore, to be held on 3 December 2022.

On 31 May 2020, Mayday held an online concert titled Suddenly Very Want to See You (Chinese: 突然好想見到你), also promoted as Mayday Live in the Sky. The performance was livestreamed globally through YouTube and Facebook, allowing the band to maintain its connection with fans despite restrictions on large-scale public gatherings during the COVID-19 pandemic. The concert was also dedicated to encouraging frontline healthcare workers during the outbreak.

On 7 November 2020, Mayday announced their Fly to 2021 concert tour, with five concerts at Taoyuan International Baseball Stadium from 26 December 2020 to 2 January 2021, which was postponed to 31 December 2020 to 10 January 2021 due to the pandemic; five concerts at Taichung Intercontinental Baseball Stadium from 17 to 22 February 2021, which were postponed to 4 to 12 December 2021 due to the pandemic; and five concerts at Tainan Municipal Stadium from 20 to 29 March 2021. One additional show was later added to the Taoyuan list, held on 8 January 2021. This tour was exceptionally meaningful as the band had not held a Taiwan tour since 2004. As a gesture of gratitude to COVID-19 frontline workers, the band's label B'in Music gave out 6,000 free tickets to medical staff in Taoyuan, Taichung, and Tainan. On 24 December 2020, Mayday released the single "Because of You", composed and written by Ashin. The band toured again in East Asia, North America, and Europe.

=== 2023–present: #5525 Back To That Day 25th Anniversary World Tour ===
The final shows of the Mayday Nowhere Re: Live Tour were held at Singapore's National Stadium on 13 and 14 January 2024. To celebrate Mayday's 25th anniversary, the band announced their brand new #5525 Back To That Day world tour.

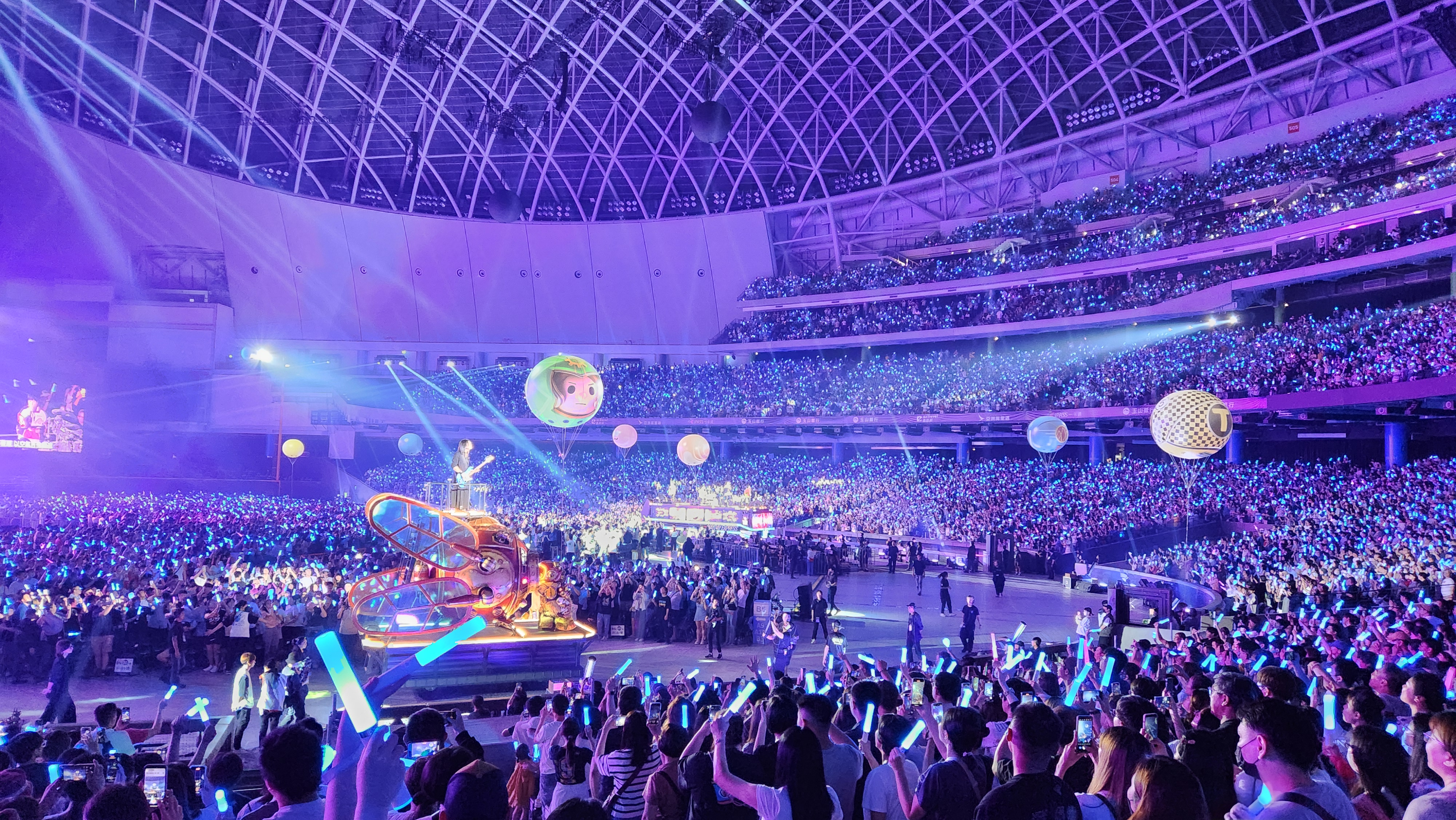
Mayday at the Taipei Dome during the 5525 tour

During their March 2025 dates in Kaohsiung, they set a new attendance record for the National Stadium, having played 29 times at the venue to a combined 1.45 million people over seven different tours. In December 2024, they released the single "Willful" (任性) as the theme song for the drama series The First Frost. The band also announced that they would be bringing their 25th anniversary tour to Sydney's Accor Stadium and Las Vegas' Allegiant Stadium on 22 February 2025 and 29 March 2025 respectively. Between 27 June to 12 July 2025, the band made their debut Taipei Dome appearance with its #5525 Back To That Day world tour.

In 2026, Mayday was scheduled to perform five shows at Kai Tak Sports Park on March 24, 25, 27, and 28. On March 9, the organizer announced the cancellation of the March 24 show and the addition of a March 29 show. This last-minute change outraged attendees, with more than 100 complaints about the cancelled show involving a total of HK$296,194 (US$37,860). As compensation, Mayday invited the fans to attend a free rehearsal.

== Artistry ==
=== Musical style and themes ===
During their first three albums, Ashin was responsible for the lyrics and composition while the other members were solely responsible for the musical arrangements. The other members began taking part in the composition process with the fourth album, Time Machine. Their discography is predominantly in Mandarin. Their first four albums contained songs sung in Taiwanese Hokkien, which four of the members are fluent or conversant in.

Mayday's early style of music was marked by a raw style of music production that tended towards Hokkien garage rock tunes and mostly contained themes of teenage angst and growing up. They gained popularity in their earlier years for capturing the zeitgeist of Taiwanese youth in the mid to late 1990s. Earlier lyrics written by Ashin also referenced issues faced by their age demographic, such as dealing with parental and societal expectations and transitioning into young adulthood. After returning from their military service hiatus, the subject matter of their songs shifted towards more mature themes including marriage and family, regrets over one's life choices and dealing with career disappointments. Their cross-generational appeal has been attributed to the wide spectrum of relatable themes covered.

The emotional relationship between the musicians and their audience is a focal point of many of Mayday’s songs and music videos, with the band infusing their career into the lives of their listeners and vice versa, both lyrically and visually. The connection is based on shared realities, with the music reflecting the lives of both the creators and the crowd; as they age, as the world changes around them, Mayday’s members infuse their brand of rock with what they see and experience.
—Billboard

Although often referred to as a rock band in the media, Mayday's discography primarily falls in the category of "pop rock". They have refused to be pigeon-holed in any particular genre, earning them derision from rock purists but garnering them critical acclaim and broad popular appeal for the subject matter covered in their lyrics. The 2006 album Born to Love saw a departure from the mostly high-tempo musical style of previous albums with the incorporation of soft rock and rock ballads. Musically, they have experimented with a variety of genres outside of the rock genre, ranging from jazz in "Brotherhood" (兄弟) from History of Tomorrow to acoustic guitar-based R&B in "The Apple" (一顆蘋果) from People Life, Ocean Wild, to hook-heavy pop in the 2005 single "Love-ing" (戀愛ing). Billboard has described their sound as "inspirational rock music that blurs the lines of alternative and pop."

The lyrics of their songs have referred to various historical figures and cultural icons such as Journey to the West, Noah's Ark, Mickey Mouse, Superman, Neil Armstrong, John Lennon, and Che Guevara. Ashin has also cited movies and novels as inspiration for his songs including "Viva Love" (愛情萬歲) which was inspired by avant-garde Taiwanese director Tsai Ming Liang's 1994 movie Vive L'Amour, while the song "Armor" (武裝), was influenced by the television adaptation of the novel Crystal Boys (孽子) and Haruki Murakami's novel Kafka on the Shore. Other songs were directly inspired by or alluded to the members' personal experiences; for example, "Time Machine" (時光機) from the eponymous studio album was a tribute to Monster's mother after she fell ill, "Sun Wu-Kong" (孫悟空) from their fourth studio album used the storyline and characters from Journey to the West as a satirical representation of the members' close friendship, and "T1213121" from Second Round refers to guitar fingering notations and contained tongue-in-cheek references to their experiences as high school students learning to play the guitar.

=== Influences ===
Mayday has expressed their admiration of the Beatles, whom they cite as influencing their ideals of rock music. The eighth track of their fifth album is called "John Lennon" (約翰藍儂) in which the band espouses its dreams to become the "Beatles of the Chinese World" (華人世界的披頭四). Other musical influences cited by the members include the Irish band U2, the British band Oasis, and the Japanese pop music artists Mr. Children.

=== Collaborations ===
Mayday is known for collaborating with top Mandopop stars and featuring up-and-coming artists as guests at their concerts. Notably, lead singer Ashin has written lyrics and composed songs for many singers, including Victor Wong, JJ Lin, Jolin Tsai, Fish Leong, Twins, Nicholas Tse, Jam Hsiao, S.H.E, Alan Tam, Leehom Wang, Rene Liu, Della Ding, and many others. In 2019, Ashin was featured on Jay Chou’s single "Won't Cry". Other members of the band have also undertaken album and song production for other artists signed to their record label.

== Impact and legacy ==
Since their early days, Mayday has been known for their irreverent approach towards certain norms associated with the domestic rock scene and music industry practices. Their original name "So Band" was a pun on the Taiwanese Hokkien term for "toilet" as they "wanted to be as ubiquitous as public toilets" and their first album was simply named Mayday's First Album. During the 23rd Golden Melody Awards they went viral for their acceptance speech after receiving the Best Band Award; the members each ate a banana together as a nod to a scene from their music video for "Fool" (憨人) and a statement on their solidarity. They opted for a clean-cut "boys next door" public image and sang about relatable issues of their generation instead of taking an anti-establishment stance like their rock counterparts were then known for. Before Mayday's emergence, bands in Taiwan were either mainly active in the underground music scene or took on a strong political stance, thus being considered as outliers by the mainstream music industry. Mayday has been credited with popularizing mainstream Taiwanese bands by gaining visibility through the use of mass media.

Mayday have been nominated for and won awards in multiple categories at the Golden Melody Awards and have won the Best Band Award a record four times. They have appeared in the now-discontinued Forbes China Celebrity 100 three times, as well as the Forbes Asia's 100 Digital Stars 2020 list.

One of the most popular bands in the Chinese-speaking world, Mayday are regarded as "concert kings" and known for their box office power, especially in Asia and within the Chinese diaspora. During the 2000s, an era in which Mandopop girl groups and boybands such as S.H.E and F4 were mainly dominating the Mandarin-speaking music scene, Mayday established themselves as a band with comparable popularity. They broke a number of records and reached several milestones within the Taiwanese and Mandarin-speaking music industry: most number of concerts held by a Taiwanese band/group in the Beijing National Stadium, the first act from the Mandarin-speaking music industry to play at Madison Square Garden, and the first artist to break Michael Jackson's long-standing solo concert attendance record in Taiwan. Mayday Life 3D, the concert film that covered their Life tour, is the highest-grossing concert film by any artist from the Chinese-speaking music industry. Despite their last full-length studio album being released in 2016, they have continuously remained one of the most streamed Taiwanese artists on Spotify.

== Controversy ==
=== Politics ===
As individuals, Mayday members have expressed their political views. Notably, Masa posted a photo of himself attending a Sunflower Student Movement protest in Taipei while Stone expressed his support for the 2019–20 Hong Kong protests in a Facebook comment. As a band, they have jointly refrained from making direct statements favoring any political faction, despite efforts by fans, political commentators, and domestic politicians to label them as either pro-China or pro-Taiwan independence. Ashin himself noted that they preferred to be known for their music rather than politics. In late December 2023, amid the band's lip-syncing controversy, Reuters reported that the band had refused a request by China's National Radio and Television Administration to publicly declare support for Chinese unification ahead of Taiwan's January presidential and legislative elections, attributing Shanghai authorities' lip-syncing investigation to this refusal.

=== Lip-syncing allegations ===
Between 2013 and 2014, music critic Liang Huan repeatedly questioned Mayday's vocal proficiency and accused Ashin of lip-syncing during live performances. The controversy resurfaced in November 2023 when music blogger "Sheng Li Xue" publicized allegations that Mayday had lip-synced during their Shanghai concerts earlier that month. Shortly after, Bilibili creator "Mai Tian Nong Fu," known for vocal-separation analyses of pop singers, evaluated fan recordings from Mayday's November shows in Shanghai and London, alleging that nearly half the songs were lip-synced or relied on pre-recorded vocal tracks. "Sheng Li Xue" subsequently filed formal complaints with Chinese regulators, under whose commercial performance laws lip-syncing constitutes consumer fraud. B'in Music and Ashin denied the allegations, livestreaming their December 7 Paris concert to demonstrate vocal authenticity. Amid separate claims of political motivations surrounding Taiwan's elections, China's Taiwan Affairs Office dismissed such narratives as unfounded. Following an examination of original soundboard audio and on-site monitoring logs, the Shanghai Municipal Administration of Culture and Tourism concluded its investigation in May 2024, announcing that no evidence of lip-syncing was found across the band's eight Shanghai concerts in November, 2023.

== Members ==
Stage name		Birth name		Instrument
English	Chinese	Romanized	Chinese	Instrument
Monster	怪獸	Wen Shang-yi	溫尚翊	Guitar
Ashin	阿信	Chen Hsin-hung	陳信宏	Vocals
Stone	石頭	Shih Chin-hang	石錦航	Guitar
Masa	瑪莎	Tsai Sheng-yen	蔡昇晏	Bass guitar
Ming	冠佑	Liu Kuan-yu	劉冠佑	Drums

== Discography ==
- Mayday's First Album (1999)
- Viva Love (2000)
- People Life, Ocean Wild (2001)
- Time Machine (2003)
- God's Children Are All Dancing (2004)
- Born to Love (2006)
- Poetry of the Day After (2008)
- Second Round (2011)
- History of Tomorrow (2016)

== Concerts ==
=== World tours ===
- Final Home World Tour (2004–2006)
- Jump! The World Tour (2007–2008)
- D.N.A World Tour (2009–2010)
- Just Rock It! World Tour (2011–2020)
- Nowhere World Tour (2011–2014)
- Life Tour (2017–2019)
- Really Want To See You Tour (2020–2023)
- 5525 Back to That Day Tour (2023–2026)
