= Ashin =

Taiwanese singer and songwriter

Ashin 阿信
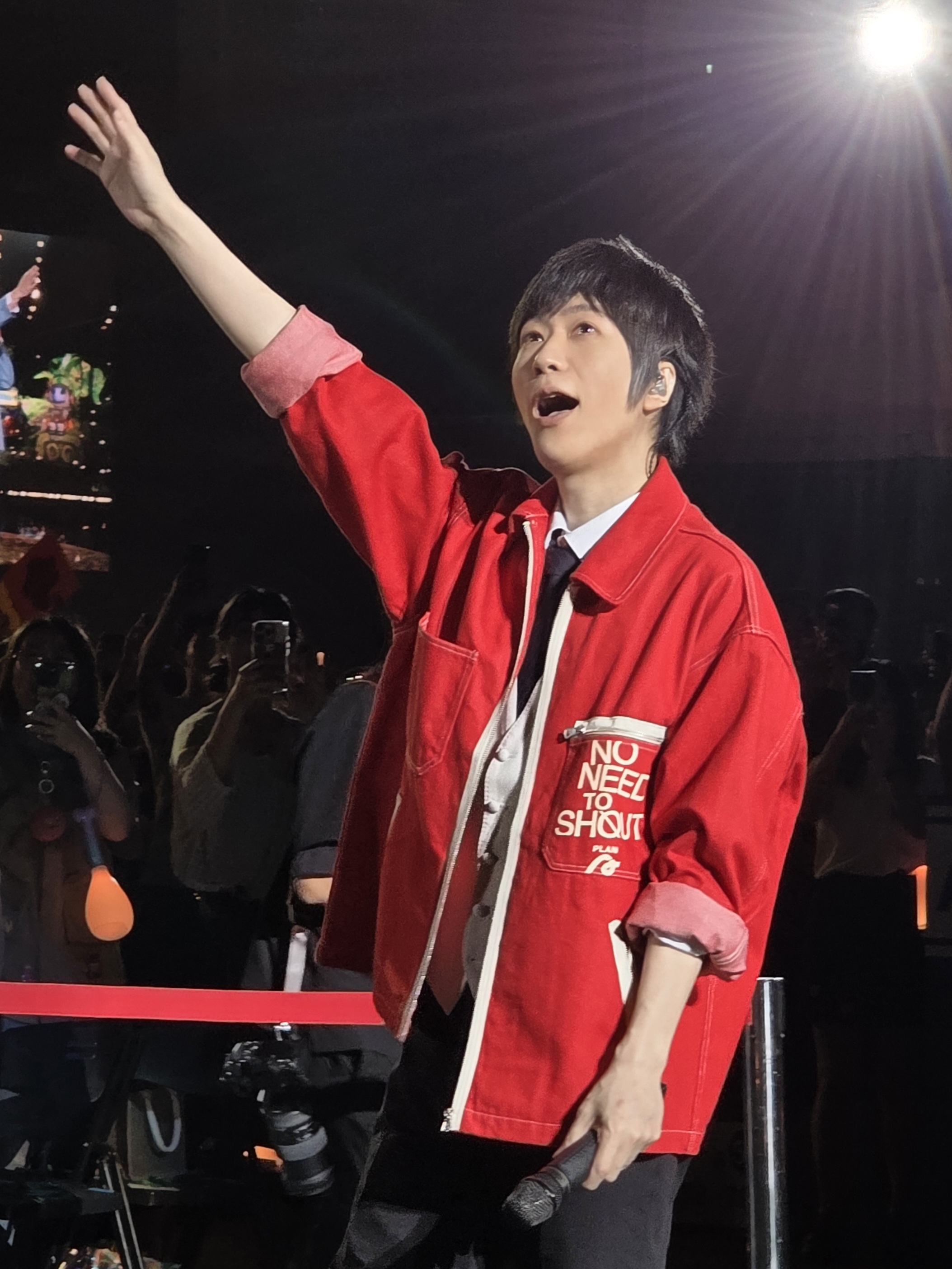
- Ashin in July 2026
- Born: Chen Hsin-hung; 6 December 1975 (age 50); Beitou, Taipei, Taiwan
- Occupations: Singer; songwriter; designer
- Years active: 1999–present
- Musical career
- Genres: Mandopop; Hokkien pop (rock)
- Instruments: Vocals; guitar
- Labels: Rock Records (1999–2008); B'in Music (2006–present)
- Member of: Mayday

Chinese name
- Traditional Chinese: 陳信宏
- Simplified Chinese: 陈信宏
Transcriptions
Standard Mandarin
- Hanyu Pinyin: Chén Xìnhóng
Hakka
- Pha̍k-fa-sṳ: Chhîn Sìn-fên
Yue: Cantonese
- Jyutping: Can4 seon3 wang4
Southern Min
- Hokkien POJ: Tân Sìn-hông

Chen Hsin-hung (Chinese: 陳信宏; pinyin: Chén Xìnhóng; Pe̍h-ōe-jī: Tân Sìn-hông), known professionally as Ashin (Chinese: 阿信; pinyin: Āxìn) (born 6 December 1975), is a Taiwan singer and songwriter. He is best known as the vocalist of the rock band Mayday. He is also the founder and designer of the clothing line StayReal, a shareholder of the music label B'in Music, and was elected a board member of the Taiwan Public Television Service in 2013.

== Early life ==
Ashin was born in Beitou District, Taiwan into a family of four, consisting of his parents, himself, and a younger brother. His family owned a record store, which inspired his passion for music. Ashin's childhood ambition was to become a singer, but his vocal range was too narrow. He claims his bandmates selected him to be Mayday's singer as he was the worst instrumentalist out of all of them. Ashin can play both guitar and drums.

Ashin attended a public elementary and middle school in Beitou District. After graduating from middle school, he was accepted into one of the top high schools in Taiwan, The Affiliated Senior High School of National Taiwan Normal University, where he majored in visual arts. He served as the chairman of the National Taiwan Normal University Senior High School Graduates Association.

== Career ==
=== 1990–1995: Early composing ===
Ashin joined his high school's guitar club and was made president the following year. It was in this guitar club that he met the other members of Mayday: Monster, Masa, and Stone. At the age of 19, he began composing music. He wrote songs in Mandarin and Taiwanese Hokkien as his parents and grandparents are fluent in both languages. As a child, Ashin was highly influenced by The Beatles, Lo Ta-yu (羅大佑), Wu Bai(伍佰), and Mr. Children. Ashin's first song, "Hao Ju Hao San", was released on Richie Jen's 2001 album "Fei Niao." After graduating from high school, Ashin attended Shih Chien University, where he majored in interior design.

=== 1995–1997: SoBand ===
In 1995, together with Monster and Qian You-Da (Mayday's original drummer), Ashin formed "SoBand". Shortly after the band formed, Masa came on board as the band's bassist. Ashin was both the lead vocalist and the guitarist and during their formative years the band played at a number of major bars across the country. In 1997, shortly after Stone joined the band, the members decided to change their name to Mayday. Ming joined the band later as the group's drummer.

=== 1997–present: Mayday ===
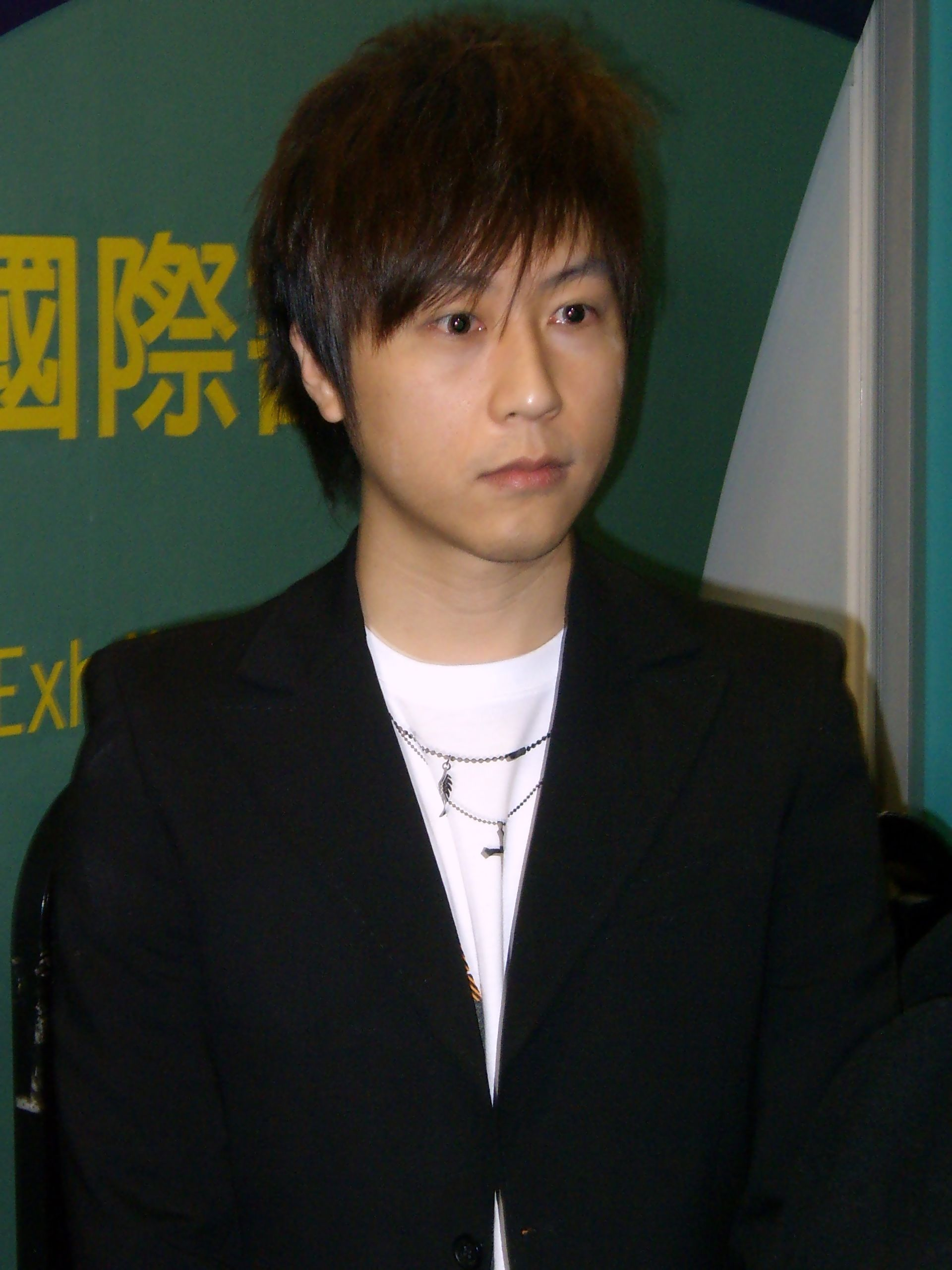
Ashin in 2008

Mayday began as an underground rock band. They sent demo tapes to the major record labels and were spotted by producer Jonathan Lee (李宗盛) of Rock Records. Under Rock Records, Mayday released their first official album in 1999 and began to gain fame. They released five albums under Rock Records before leaving to set up their own record label, B'in Music, with former Rock Records executives Chen Yongzhi and Xie Zhifen.

For Mayday's first three albums, Ashin was the sole composer of the band's music. It was only during the production of the band's fourth album that the other band members began to contribute their own work. Ashin's compositional talents have been highly sought after by other artists, and as a result, he has composed a significant number of songs for artists such as Fish Leong, Rene Liu, S.H.E, Jolin Tsai, JJ Lin, Richie Ren, Twins, Fran, Alien Huang, Leehom Wang, Denise Ho, Nicholas Tse, Victor Wong, Della Ding, Aska Yang, Wakin Chau, Jam Hsiao, Energy, Stefanie Sun, and others.

In 2019, he collaborated with Jay Chou and released a single called Won't Cry (說好不哭), a song from his 15th studio album titled Greatest Works of Art. In 2021 he composed the official main theme from Brave Animated Series, in association with the rock band LION.

Outside of music, Ashin published his first book, Happy.BIRTH.Day: Birth of Rock Poems, in 2006. It features the lyrics of 60 of his songs, as well as a selection of his photography. In 2008, he published "Escape to Japan", a guidebook to unconventional traveling in Japan. In 2012, he collaborated with Ninagawa Mika and published a photography book called "Stairway to Heaven".

== Collaborations ==
- 2005 – FIRST Day (第一天） with Stefanie Sun
- 2008 – Fire to the Devil (走火入魔) with Della Ding
- 2009 – Fireworks (花火) with Della Ding
- 2012 – Fateful Opportunity (天機) with Magic Power
- 2013 – Dark Knight (黑暗騎士) with JJ Lin
- 2015 – The Future is Right Now (未來就是現在) with Magic Power
- 2015 – Same Answer (同一個答案) with Hush
- 2016 – Cheers! (乾啦 乾啦) with Richie Ren and 831
- 2018 – When Every Star (當每顆星星) with Huang Bo
- 2018 – Core (沙文) with Sandy Lam
- 2019 – Won't Cry (說好不哭) with Jay Chou
- 2022 – We are All Living in Evolution (我們都活在進化之中) with Bai An and Accusefive
- 2025 – Unforgettable Stars ~Forever Forever~ with Jay Chou, Vic Chou, Jerry Yan and Vanness Wu
- 2026 – My Love with Jerry Yan

== Commercials ==
- 2006: MusiQ MP3
- 2007: Guerlain
- 2008: 2008 Taipei International Book Exhibition
- 2009: 7-Eleven – Coffee
- 2011: Familymart
