= Golden Melody Award for Album of the Year =

Taiwanese music award

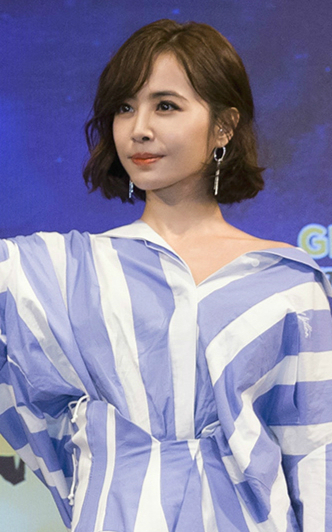
- Pleasure by Jolin Tsai is the most recent recipient.
- Awarded for: Outstanding vocal recording albums in the pop music genre
- Country: Taiwan
- Presented by: Ministry of Culture
- First award: 1990
- Currently held by: Jolin Tsai – Pleasure (2026)

Highlights
- Most wins: Jay Chou (3)
- Most nominations: Jay Chou (4)
- Website: gma.tavis.tw

The Golden Melody Award for Album of the Year (Chinese: 金曲獎年度專輯獎) is presented by the Ministry of Culture of Taiwan to honor quality vocal or instrumental recording albums in the pop music genre. The honor was first presented in the 2nd Golden Melody Awards. The award was discontinued in 2005 and was separated into Best Mandarin Album, Best Taiwanese Album, Best Hakka Album, and Best Indigenous Language Album. In 2017, the award was revived and albums in different languages are eligible for this award. Particular awards for Best Mandarin Album, Best Taiwanese Album, Best Hakka Album, and Best Indigenous Language Album remained.

== Recipients ==
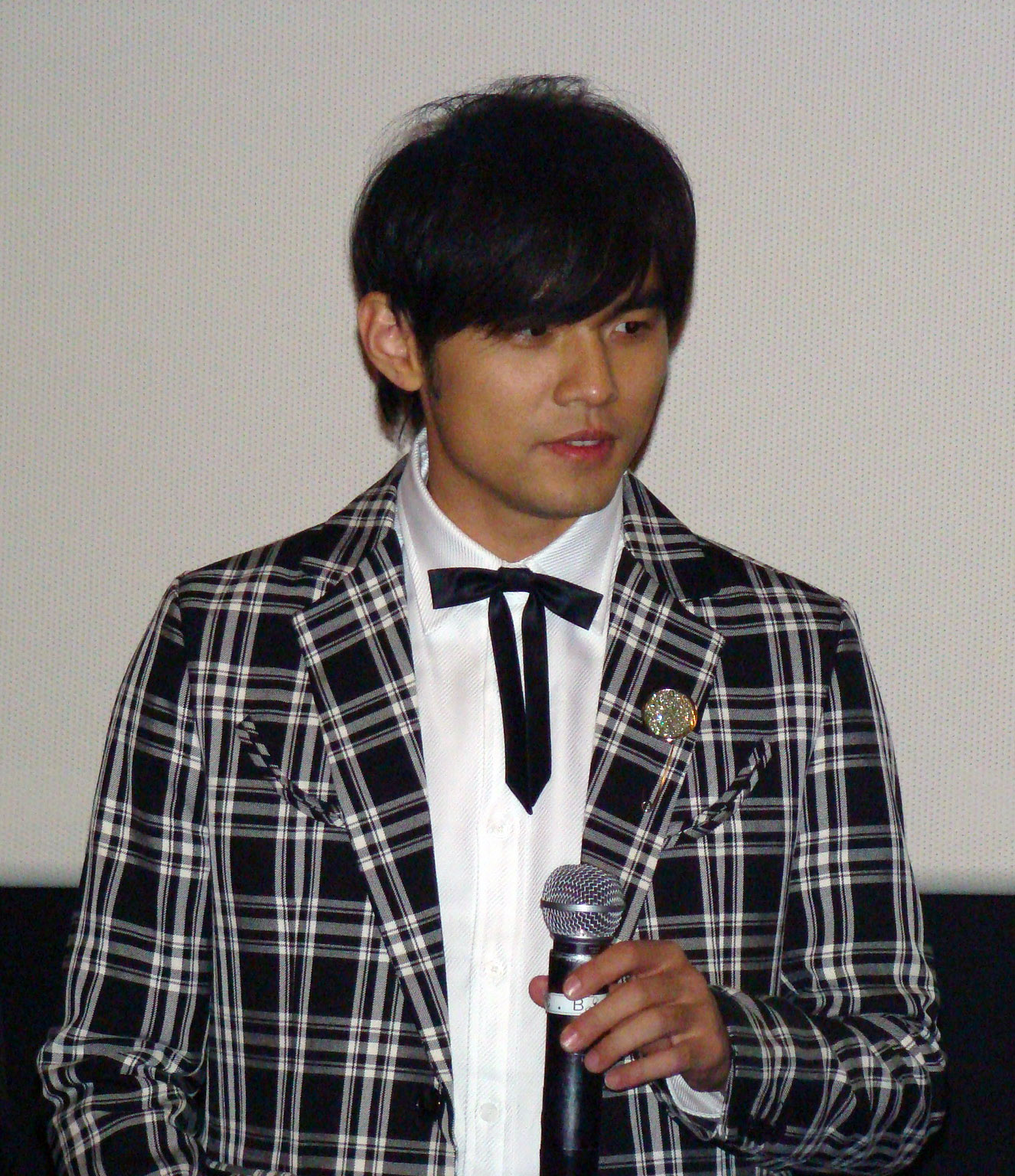
Four-time nominee received the most nominations in this category, including three-time award winner Jay Chou

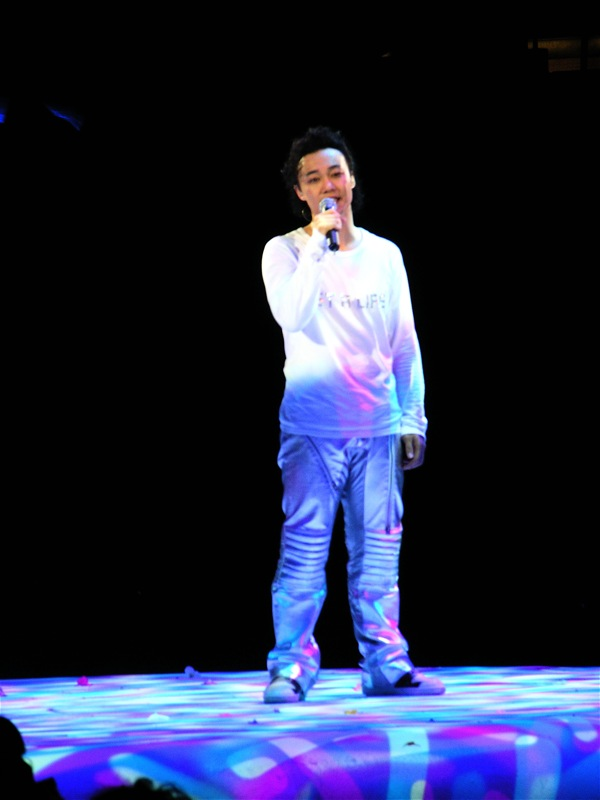
Three-time nominee, including two-time award winner Eason Chan

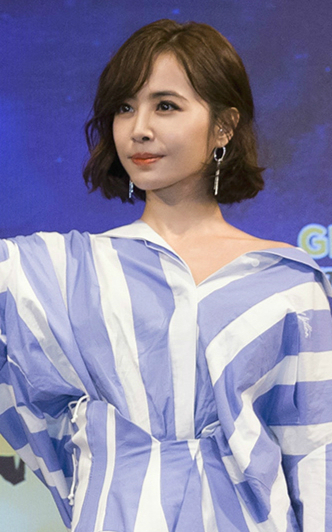
Three-time nominee, including two-time award winner Jolin Tsai

Year	Performing artist(s)	Work	Nominees	Ref.
1990 (Oct.)	Michelle Pan	Am I the Woman You Loved	Tiger Huang – More than Friends; Johnny Yin – Life Is a Lively Song; Jacky Cheung – Seem to Have Met Before; Sarah Chen – Talk to You and Listen to You	
1991	Chiang Yu-heng	One Alone	Dave Wang – Dream for Love; Simon Hsueh – Life.....; Ou-yang Fei-fei – Forever Lover; Yeh Chi-tien – Hometown	
1992	Christine Hsu	Where Are You From	Nobody – My Name Is Nobody; Top Partner – Ode to Joy; Fei Yu-ching – Those Were the Days When My Heart Was; Ukulele – Acknowledge a Mistake	
1993	Jody Chiang	Words After Drinking	Nobody – Everybody Listen to Me Sing a Song; Johnny Yin – Blue Sky; Jacky Cheung – The Goodbye Kiss; Tsai Chin – Don't Look at My Eyes	
1994	Stella Chang	Left and Right	Tang Na – Hold Me Closer; Jody Chiang – Tango with Bitter Wine; Angus Tung – Now and Forever; Johnny Yin – Theatre Song	
1996	Fei Yu-ching	Good Night Song	Faye Wong – Sky; Eagle Pan – I Don't Want to Be Lonely; Chris Hung – Life of Love; Chyi Chin – Dim Moon	
1997	Tsai Chen-nan	Nan's Song	Valen Hsu – If Cloud Knows; Chyi Chin – Pure Love Song; Chyi Chin – Silk Road; Christine Hsu – Moon Girl in the Sky	
1998	Tom Chang	Duplicity	David Tao – David Tao; A-Mei – Bad Boy; Tsai Chen-nan – Love Hate Relationship; Karen Mok – To Be	
1999	Wu Bai	Lonely Tree, Lonely Bird	Wang Leehom – Revolution; Shunza – I Am Not a Star; Shino Lin – Shino; Winnie Hsin – Every Women	
2000	Mavis Fan	I Want Us Together	David Tao – I'm Ok; Summer Lei – Cheek Pressed to the Moon; Samingad – The sounds of Sun, Wind, and Prairie; Faith Yang – Silence	
2001	Jay Chou	Jay	Na Ying – Sad Romance; Faye Wong – Fable; Karen Mok – Karen Mok on the Twelfth Floor; Stefanie Sun – My Desired Happiness	
2002	Jay Chou	Fantasy	Sandy Lam – Truly...; Stefanie Sun – Kite; A-Mei – Truth; Harlem Yu – Tidal Wave; Mayday – People Life, Ocean Wild	
2003	Eason Chan	Special Thanks to...	Jay Chou – The Eight Dimensions; A-Mei – Fever; Shunza – Dear Shunza; Liu Shao-hsi – Wild Funk	
2004	Jay Chou	Ye Hui Mei	Fish Leong – Beautiful; Jody Chiang – Wishes in the Wind; Jolin Tsai – Magic; Faye Wong – To Love; Hsieh Yu-wei – I-Sa	
2017	Sangpuy	Yaangad	Sheng-xiang Band – Village Besieged; No Party for Cao Dong – The Servile; Khalil Fong – Journey to the West; Guo Ding – The Silent Star Stone; Eve Ai – Talk About Eve; Mayday – History of Tomorrow; Waa Wei – Run! Frantic Flowers!; Xu Jun – Million Songs Hill; Wu Bai – Ding Zi Hua; DJ Didilong – Taipei Didilong; Fire EX. – Reborn; Hsieh Ming-yu – Chiu Nien; TaiKo Electro Company – TaiKo Electro Company; The Chairman – The Boyhood of Chairman; Urban Cat – The Golden Age; Misa & Underground Stream – Mosaic of the Night; Wen Yin-chang, Lo Su-jung, Lin Sheng Xiang – Smiley Universe; Gina's Can – The Funky Song for Tung Blossom; Chen Wei-roo – Wo Ba Jiang Hai Lu Wo Ma Jiang Si Xian; Tai Siao-chun – Tracing the River of Life; Long-Ger – Longer Story; A-Bao – Vavayan; Sadu Kata Buan – Sadu Kata Buan	
2018	Eason Chan	C'mon In~	Leon Zheng – When I Leave Taipei; Lala Hsu – The Inner Me; A-Mei – Story Thief; JJ Lin – Message in a Bottle; Dean Ting – The Journal; EggPlantEgg – Cartoon Character; Henry Hsu – Mend the Dreams; Chen Ming-chang – Shaking the Mountains and Rivers; Chiang Yu-ta – Kin; Hsiao Huang-chi – Cheers; Qiu Lin – Da Ling Jiao Xia 2; Huang Wei-jie – Dim Night; Ayugo Huang – The Dirt Road; Caleb Hsiao – Hakka Girl 2017; Paliulius – Sitting Together; Seredau – Infection; CMO Group – Naomi; Siva9 Band – With You	
2019	Jolin Tsai	Ugly Beauty	L.O.V.E. – Eason Chan; Where Are We Going? – Eli Hsieh; Wu Bing Singing, Yo Chin Soothing – Leo Wang; Fade to Exist – Eve Ai; Shi's Journey – Shi Shi; ØZI: The Album – ØZI; 0 – Sandy Lam; Battlefields of Asura – Chthonic; Snails – Joey Chiang; Tsa-bóo gín-á – Nana Lee; Jazz’s Good! – Emily Kuan; Warming a Pot of Youth to Drink – Ardor Huang; Darknet – Dwagie; Forgotten West – Sam Liao; Drifting – Voter Hsu, Huang Wei-chieh, Liu Jung-chang, and Yeh Yu-ting; Return & Restore – iColor; Stay – Lo Ssu-jung; Love for Granted – Gina Yang; Swasieq – Yawai Mawlin; Senglit – Muniyu; Vangav – Cemelesai; Yuan Yin Cheng Xian A Mei Zu Fu Yin Chuan Chang – Wu Chia-lu, Tseng Kuang-fu, Wang Fu-lai, Yang Shih-mei, Lin Jung-mei, and Kuo Mei-yu; Ti Cemelesai Ata Salasaladj – Kerekelj and Eleng	
2020	Abao	Kinakaian MOTHER TONGUE	Love is Calling Me – Joanna Wang; City Zoo – G.E.M.; Hypnocity – Peggy Hsu; Juvenile A – Sandee Chan; Hidden, Not Forgotten – Waa Wei; Spaceman – Wu Tsing-fong; Makeover – Loh Tsui Kweh Commune; We all have good nature – Justin Su; Reflection – Michelle Pan; We Are Gonnna Get Married – EggPlantEgg; Burnana – Lilium; Stand Up Like A Taiwanese – Fire EX.; Yourself – Yachun Asta Tzeng; THE SHIP OF FOOLS – Misa; Going Up To The Country – Zixuan & Slow Train; Someday – Huang Yu Han; Sasela'an – Ado; Diligent Life – Anu Kaliting Sadipongan; Insides Revealed – Sauljaljui; Salama – Chalaw Basiwali	
2021	Sangpuy	Gain Strength	Dear All – Wanfang; Where is SHI? – Shi Shi; Time Will Tell – Hebe Tien; Home Cookin – Soft Lipa; Sounds of My Life – William Wei; Shi Ri Tan – James Li; Ten – Henry Hsu; tsu-pun – Olivia Tsao; ū lí ê kòo-sū – aoi; Kā lí sioh sioh – Hao Zi; Gentleman with No Shoes – Sibongie; First Half – Hanya Chang; Khah-lah Thien-thoì – Siàu-lú khah-lah; Those tree years – Yu-Wei Hsieh; Till – ChuNoodle; When the sun rises – Wing Lo; Ah-Min – JiuLianZhenRen; Rambling Naluwan – Dakanow; How are you, my dear – Syaman macinanao; žž – žž; Lady of the ocean – Outlet Drift	
2022	Tanya Chua	Depart	Faye, Wen Ting Zhan Zai Yun Cai Shang Tiao Wu Ji Ji Zha Zha – Faye; AI-CHING – Jerry LI; HAVE A NICE DAY – Waa Wei; Night Shift – Non-Physical Troupe (NPT); A Flying Dog – Cui Jian; Jian Jian Hua – New Formosa Band; Road to… – Lilium; GOLDEN TAIZI BRO – Flesh Juicer; Don't Know – Wang Jun-Jie; Kuu – Joey Chiang; Second Half – Hanya; Return To Reality – Huang Yu Han; Mountain Of Doom – Ayugo Huang; Today is a Wild Horse – Lo Sirong; Hakka Found In Strange Land – iColor; Qiam – Bobiii P; UNDO – Wild Thing; To Wait In Silence – Osay Hongay; pongso no Tao – Paudull; 《N1》Nanguaq No.1 – Natsuko、Arase、Dremedreman、Stingie、Drangadrang、Makav、Kivi; Our Island – Sauljaljui、Putad Pihay、Emlyn、Vaiteani、Selina Leem、Sammy、Yoyo Tuki; I Thought I Didn't Know – Kerekilj	
2023	Qing Feng Wu	Mallarme's Tuesdays	Gei – Lala Hsu; Silver Lining – Pei-Yu Hung; Snow White – JADE; PRO – Kumachan (Xinkuan Xiong); Pleasing Myself – HUSH; Mercury Retrograde – Enno Cheng; Holy Gazai – A_Root; KEH – DJ MR.GIN; Marigold – HAOTING; Pity Zhu An – Cai Qiufeng; Folk Tale – Olivia Tsao; Waiting a present for – Chiu Shu; Yam Fung leu – Rita Lin; Living Room Dreaming – Julia Peng; Snail – Misa; Humble – Boiii P; Together, us – Biung; Watershed – Kivi; The Roots – Matzka; Ita – Kasiwa; ABUS – Abus・Tanapima	
2024	No Party for Cao Dong	The Clod	Flow – Faith Yang; OPEN IT – Xu Jun; Posture – Fool and Idiot; In The Clouds – Accusefive; Jude Chiu – Jude Chiu; kán-tan tsi̍t kù uē – Tēnn Pîng; Hái-hái Jîn-sing – Aoi; Human Condition – Fire EX.; Iā-Pô – Panai; Carry On – Meilinbear; Jinsei Daigaku – Henry Hsu; A Dragonfly Reads a Poem – Rita Lin; Migration – Leaf Yeh; Shape of Life – Shu-Chan Chiu; Zhin' Moi – Zoomie; Hakka Glory – Boiii P; PAMERICAH – AZ Lixiaozu・Mayaw Alang; A Letter To Happiness – Li-Ting Chiu, Sapa Truku Children's Choir; Vusam – Utjung Tjakivalid; Those Days – O-Kai Singers; Treasure – Makav; Women's Island – Ado' Kaliting Pacidal; World – Elephant Gym; You'll Forever Live In My Song – Paige Su	
2025	Siri Lee	Suí	Incomplete Rescue Manual - various artists (Note: Sandy Lam, Cyndi Wang, Cheer Chen, Hush, Pei-Yu Hung, Su Yunying, Huang Qishan, A-Lin, Sandee Chan, George Chen, Kuo Hung Tseng from Sunset Rollercoaster, Arai Soichiro, Ice Paper, JIHU, Kafe Hu, KST, Jade Chiu, Jiji Lee from Project Ace, James Lee, Qin Sifeng, Masa from Mayday, Von Citizen, Turing Music Laboratory, 3 Dogs(Xu Jun, Arai Soichiro, Sanbist Lin), Ivana Wong, Wang OK, Bernard Zheng, Zhou Yunpeng, Zhang Yuhan Leezi); OUTCOMES - J.Sheon; CAMOUFLAGE - Terence Lam; The Dreamer - Khalil Fong; GOOD SOUND WITH ATTITUDES - Trout Fresh; Ordeal by Pearls - Waa Wei; People like us - Su-hao Yang; People, Places, Things - FunkyMo; can cancan cancancan - Chen Yi Heng; phian-lâm - Ming-Yo Hsieh; Drip-Drop - Hui Chu Wang; In and Out of Dreams - Aringu; Pure Filth - TRAEGO; New Soul - ZiXuan Huang; The women's voice - Lo Ssu-Jung, Misa, Yang Shu-Yu, and Chiu Shu-Chan; Upstream - Rita Lin; na secengeceng tua venali - Giyu Tjuljaviya; kamawan za kavung - Morikilr; QUEENDOM - Abus Tanapima; Qrasun - Kumu Basaw; Draw Near - Sangpuy; VAIVAIK - Sauljaljui	
2026	Jolin Tsai	Pleasure	Hong Pei-yu – Still Moving; MJ116 – OGS; Chang Chen-yue – Go With the Flow; Jude Chiu – Leaving the Silver Waste Land; Shan Yichun – Lil Sis; Enno Cheng – Moon Phases; Ricky Hsiao – Soft Hearted; Justin Su – Theme Song; Wu Yung-chi – My Bare-Ass Brothers; CJ Mit – My Words; A-Yi Lo – Southern Winter; Ana – Final Girl; ChuNoodle – Descend Up, Ascend Down; Sarah Chen – Slow Flower Chronicles; Huang Yu-han – Ngai; Outlet Drift – Masonolay i Cepo'; Lawis Aow – Saitikotiko; Arase – AKA; Suming – Mikerid; Matzka – Djekuacan; The Crane – Same Stories, Different Narratives; Sunset Rollercoaster – Quit Quietly	

== Category facts ==
Most wins

Rank	1st	2nd
Artist	Jay Chou	Eason Chan; Sangpuy; Jolin Tsai
Total nominations	3 wins	2 wins

Most nominations

Rank	1st	2nd
Artist	Jay Chou; A-Mei; Misa	Eason Chan; Jolin Tsai; Jody Chiang; Johnny Yin; Faye Wong; Chyi Chin; Waa Wei; Luo Sirong; Sauljaljui; Fire EX. Henry Hsu; BoiiiP; Han Huang
Total nominations	4 nominations	3 nominations
