= Golden Melody Award for Song of the Year =

Taiwanese music award

- Awarded for: Outstanding vocal recording tracks in the pop music genre with wide appeal or symbolic significance
- Country: Taiwan
- Presented by: Ministry of Culture
- First award: 1990
- Currently held by: A-Lin for "Happiness Is Singing" (2026)
- Website: gma.tavis.tw

The Golden Melody Award for Song of the Year (Chinese: 金曲獎年度歌曲獎) is presented by the Ministry of Culture of Taiwan to honor outstanding vocal recording tracks in the pop music genre with wide appeal or symbolic significance. The Song of the Year award is one of the most prestigious categories at the awards presented annually since the 1st Golden Melody Awards in 1990. The award was presented for additional years until being discontinued in 1997, and was then revived in 2006. It is awarded to a single or for a track from an album, and goes to the performing artist for that song.

== Recipients ==
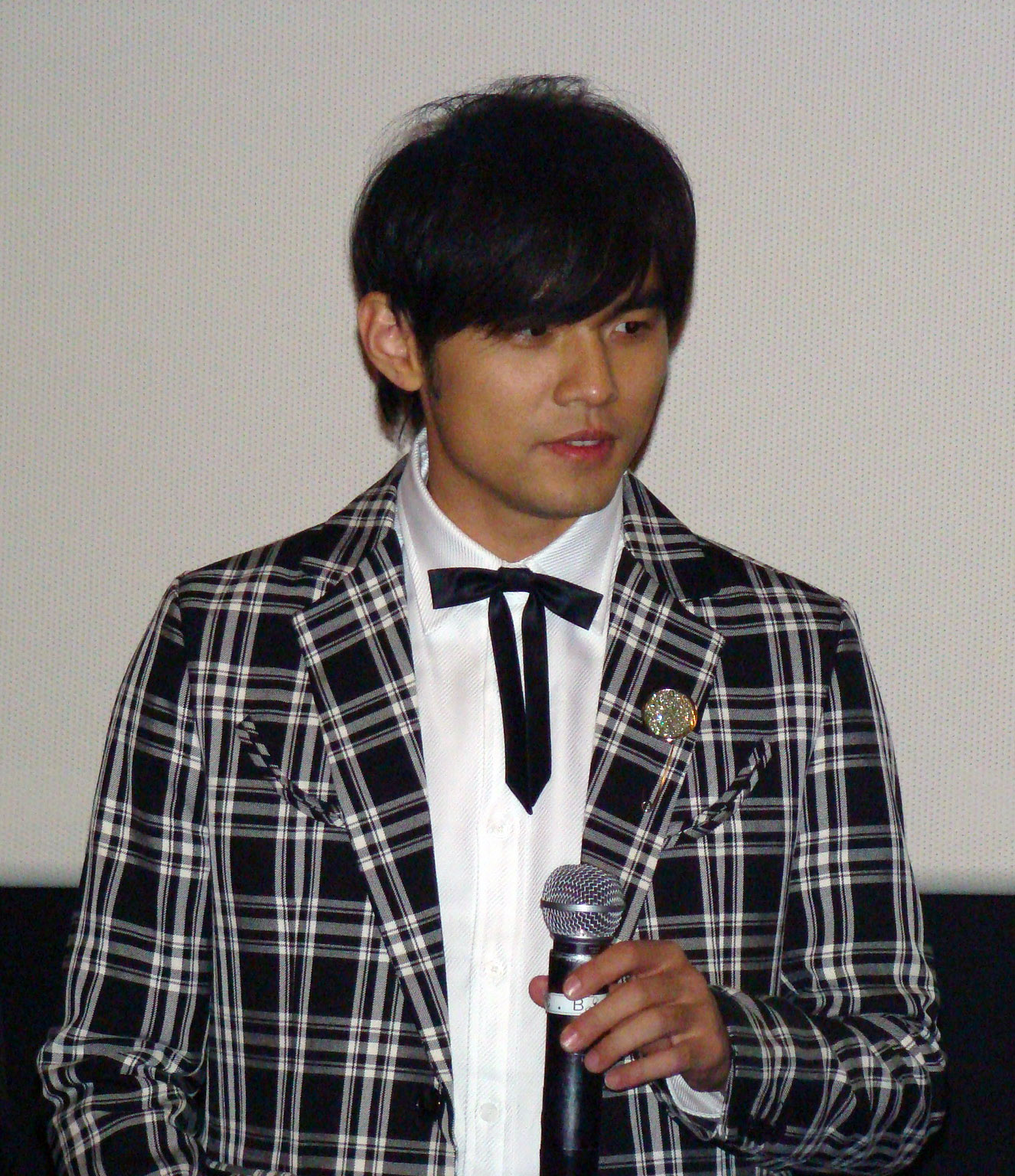
Five-time nominee, including two-time award winner Jay Chou

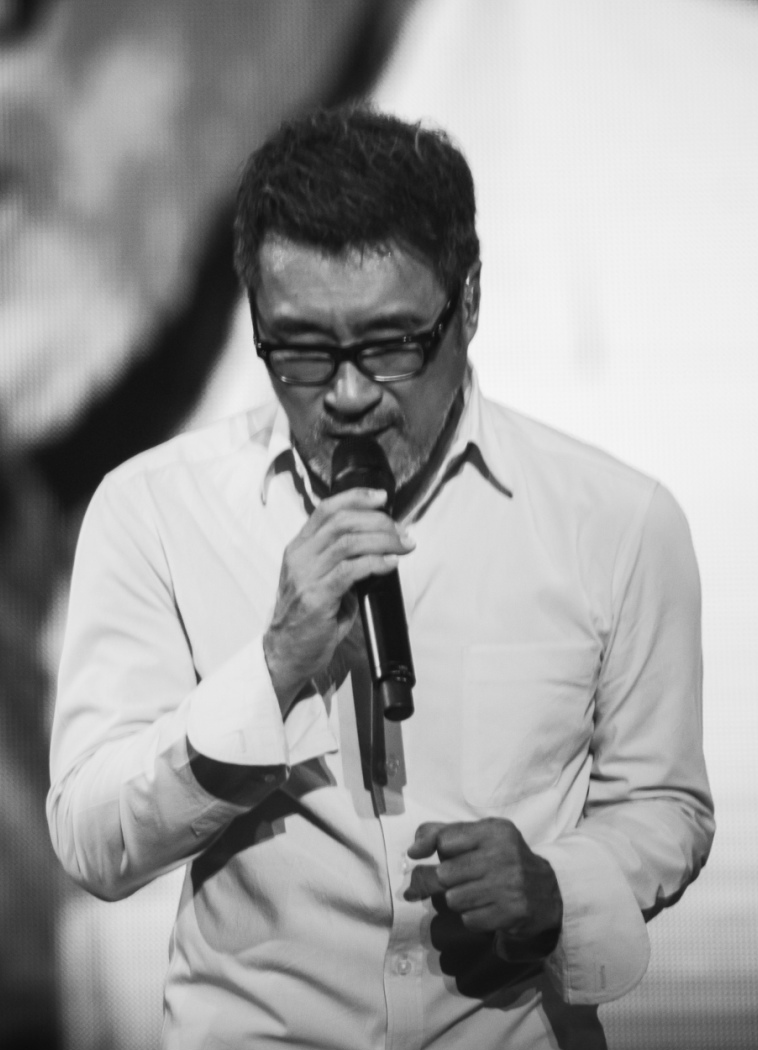
Six-time nominee received the most nominations in this category, including two-time award winner Jonathan Lee

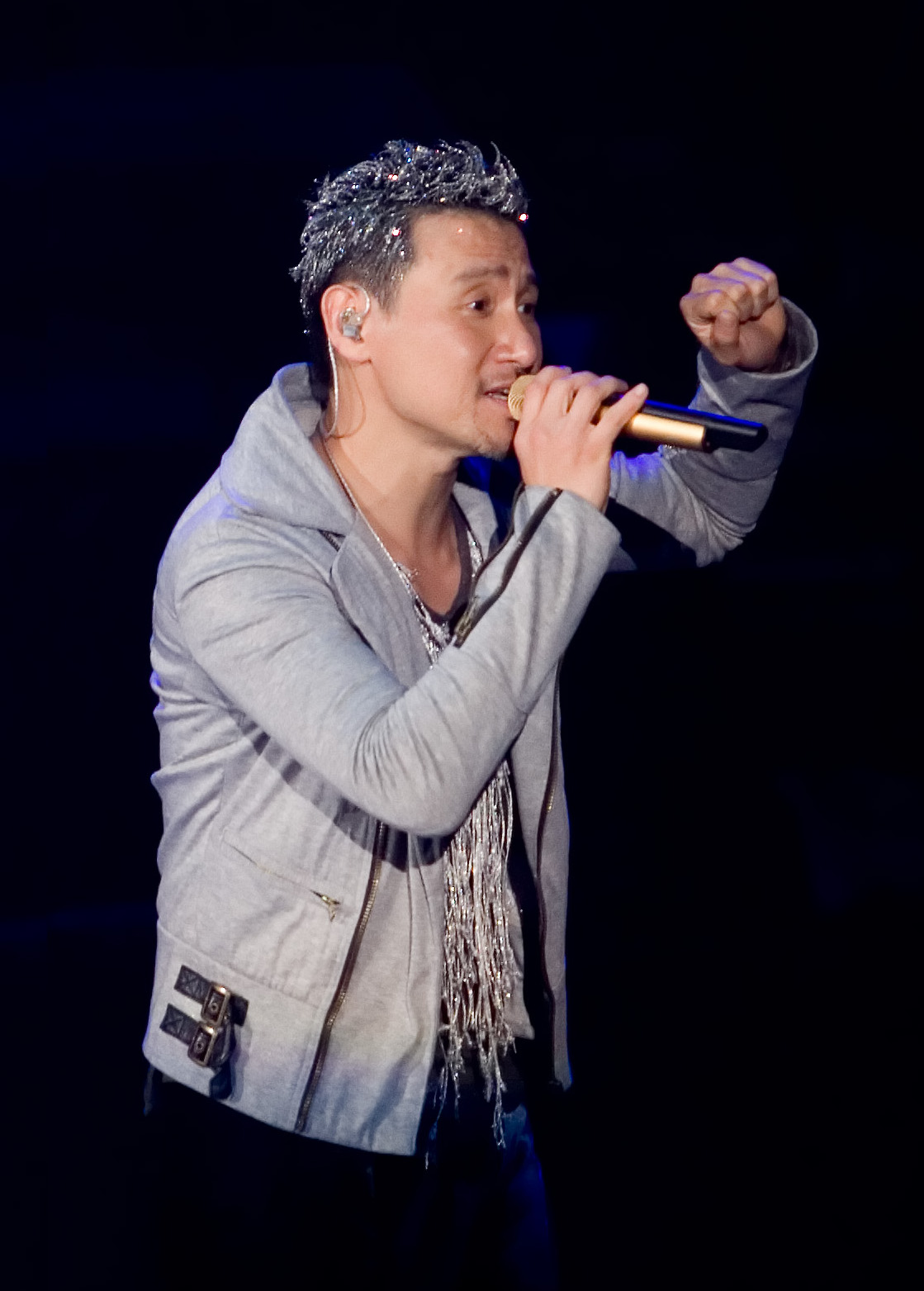
Three-time nominee, including two-time award winner Jacky Cheung

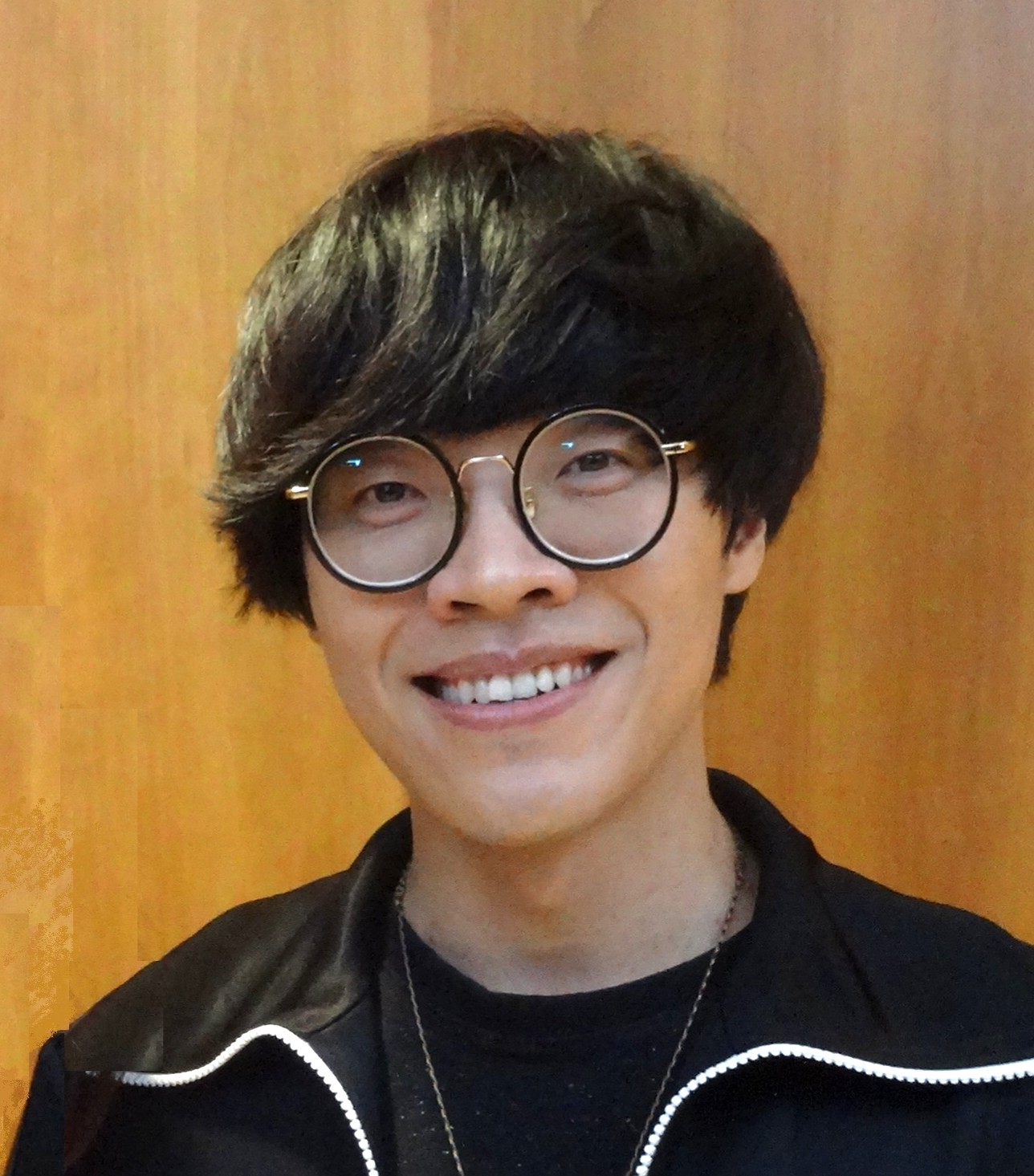
Three-time nominee, including two-time award winner Crowd Lu

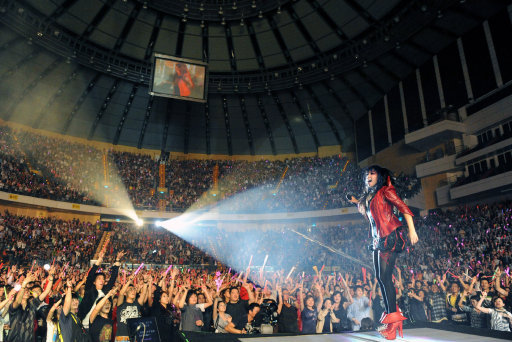
Four-time nominee, including one-time award winner A-Mei

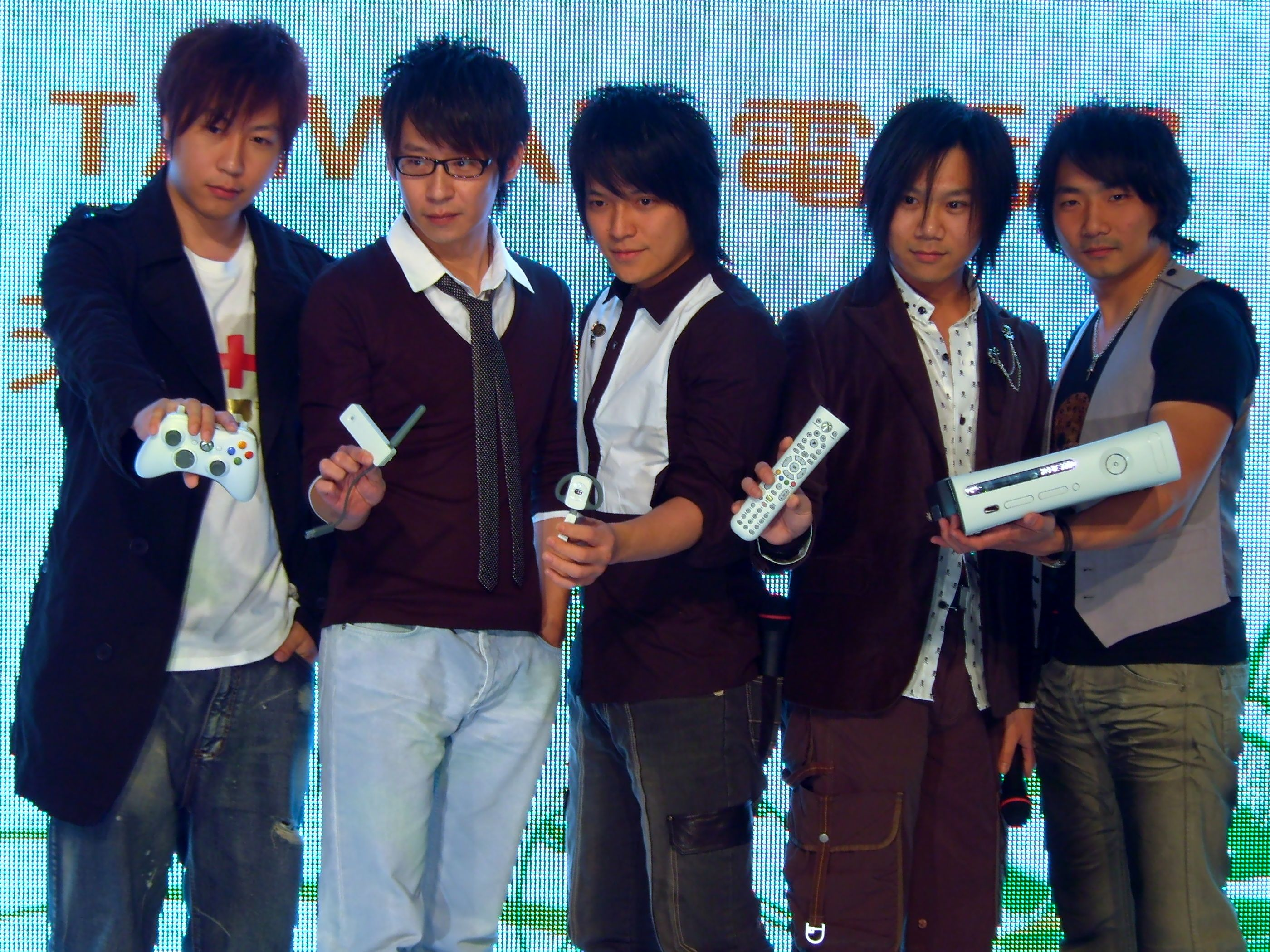
Five-time nominee, including one-time award winner Mayday

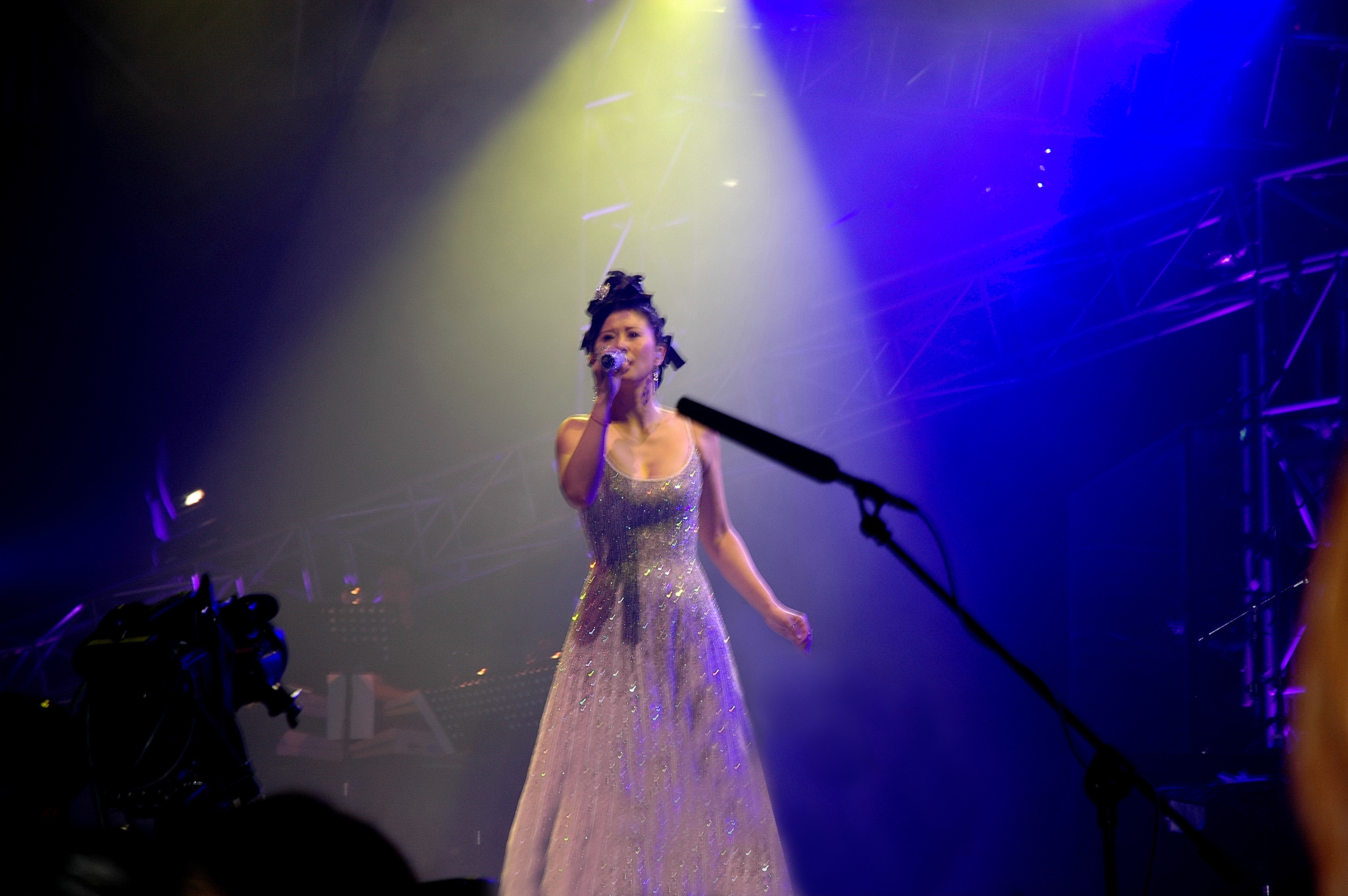
Two-time nominee, including one-time award winner Sally Yeh

Year	Performing artist(s)	Work	Nominees	Ref.
1990 (Jan.)	Eagle Pan	"I Want a Home"	Wang Wei-fang – "This Life and the Afterlife"; Chao Chuan – "I May Be Ugly but I Am Tender"; Jenny Tseng – "Still Your Hands"; Fei Yu-ching – "I Want to Loose Your Hands"; Li Tai-hsiang – "Needle and Thread"; Augustine Yeh – "Remember We Agreed to Meet"; Cyndi Chou – "Never Willing to Tell You"; Wang Wei-fang – "Talk About the Past"; Fei Yu-ching – "Who Says Juveniles Don't Know What Are Woes and Grief"	
1990 (Oct.)	Emil Chau	"There Is Love in This City"	Chang Ho-chirl – "North Wind"; Chiang Yu-heng – "I Still Have a Dream"; Lesley Lee – "Desert, Camel, Man, Woman"; Tseng Shu-ching – "Autumn Melancholy on the Trip"; Oriental Express – "Connect Your Soul to My Lines"; Chen Hsiao-yun – "Have the Opportunity to be President"; Zheng Zhihua – "Repentance"; Lesley Lee – "Skirt Flying"; Sarah Chen – "Dream to Awakening"	
1991	Lim Giong	"Marching Forward"	Liu Ping-fang – "A Stick"; Jonathan Lee – "Song of Ordinary People"; Fong Fei-fei – "Lovely Baby"; Chao Chuan – "I Were a Little Bird"; Yeh Chi-tien – "Hometown"; Tracy Huang – "Crying Sand"; Sky Wu – "Give My Special Love to the Special You"; Chao Chuan – "Appear on Stage with Make-up"; Christine Hsu – "I Love Taiwan"	
1992	Sally Yeh	"Merry Go Round"	Lo Ta-yu – "Train"; Christine Hsu – "Where Are You From"; Top Partner – "Ode to Joy"; Yang Chung-hsien – "Dad Was Closed Like a Mountain"; Christine Hsu – "Vagrancy Life"; Chen Mei-lien – "Lost Child"; Ardor Huang – "Chiang Chiang Guen"; Tracy Huang – "Buried Heart"; Little Tigers – "Fly Butterfly Fly"	
1993	Jacky Cheung	"The Goodbye Kiss"	Stella Chang & Ukulele – "Wedding"; Dave Wang – "Going Home"; Chang Hsiu-ching – "Station"; Jody Chiang – "Words After Drinking"; Julie Sue – "Holding Hands"; Huang An – "The New Butterfly Dream"; Tseng Wei-yuan – "Fortune Teller"; Yang Chung-hsien – "Theatre Feet"; Andy Lau – "Thank You for Your Love"	
1994	Jacky Cheung	"Best Wishes for You"	Phil Chang – "Well-intentioned"; Jonathan Lee – "Hope"; Yu Tai-yan – "I'd Rather"; Cyndi Chou – "Marriage Proposal"; Sally Yeh – "Friends"; Winnie Hsin – "Try to Forget"; Cheng Gin-yi – "Rouge Horse"; Sky Wu – "Favorite Is You"; Pan Li-li – "Eyebrow Make-up"	
1996	Yeh Chi-tien	"Butterfly Dreams Fly"	Tom Chang – "We Are Still Friends"; Roger Wang – "Daydream"; Andy Lau – "Forever True"; George Lam – "Appreciate"; Ang It-hong – "Father"; Cheng Gin-yi – "The Secular World"; Tsai Chin – "Light Up the Neon Lights"; Winnie Hsin – "Understanding"; Sandy Lam – "Fragrance of Roses"	
2006	Ara Kimbo	"Pacific Wind"	Jody Chiang – "Fish Likes Dreaming"; Wu Bai – "Made in Taiwan"; David Tao – "The Art of War"	
2007	David Tao & Jolin Tsai	"Marry Me Today"	Lin Sheng-hsiang – "Planting Trees"; Jay Chou & Fei Yu-ching – "Faraway"; Karen Mok – "Same World"; Deserts Chang – "Baby (In the Night)"; Sodagreen – "Little Universe"	
2008	Jay Chou	"Blue and White Porcelain"	Sodagreen – "Incomparable Beauty"; Tanya Chua – "Darwin"; Khalil Fong – "Love Song"; Stefanie Sun – "Against the Light"; A-Mei – "A Moment"	
2009	Jay Chou	"Rice Field"	Jody Chiang – "Hold You Tightly"; Claire Kuo – "The Next Dawn"; Crowd Lu – "100 Kinds of Life"; Mayday – "You Are Not Truly Happy"; Van Fan – "South of the Border"	
2010	A-Mei	"Bold for My Love"	Lala Hsu – "White Horse"; Claire Kuo – "Singing in the Trees"; Superband – "Desperado"; Cheer Chen – "The Edge"	
2011	Jonathan Lee	"Jonathan's Song"	Yao Hung – "Flower Love"; Jay Chou – "Superman Can't Fly"; Karen Mok – "Perfect Loneliness"; Freya Lim – "Wounded"; Jody Chiang – "When I Wanted to Marry"; Wang Leehom – "All the Things You Never Knew"	
2012	Mayday	"Noah's Ark"	Luantan Ascent – "Perfect Landing"; R-chord – "Growing Up"; Tanya Chua – "Sing It Out of Love"; Hu Xia – "Those Years"	
2013	Jolin Tsai	"The Great Artist"	Kay Huang – "Retrospection"; Sandy Lam – "Wordless Song"; Yonlon Chen – "Coastline"; Deserts Chang – "Rose-colored"	
2014	Jonathan Lee	"Hills"	Tizzy Bac – "It's Because We Can Feel Pain"; Cheer Chen – "Gypsy in Memory"; Jeannie Hsieh – "Sister"; Mayday – "Song of Battle"	
2015	Fire EX.	"Island's Sunrise"	Lala Hsu – "Missing"; Jacky Cheung – "The Rest of Time"; A-Mei – "Faces of Paranoia"; Jolin Tsai – "Play"	
2016	Suming	"Aka Pisawad"	A-Mei – "Matriarchy"; JJ Lin – "Twilight"; Sodagreen – "Rainy Night"; Hebe Tien – "A Little Happiness"	
2017	No Party for Cao Dong	"Simon Says"	Jay Chou – "Love Confession"; Rainie Yang – "Traces of Time in Love"; Wu Bai – "Peng Kung"; Eve Ai – "The Sum of Us"; Mayday – "Tough"; Faith Yang – "Centrifugal Force"; Yoga Lin – "Spoiled Innocence"	
2018	Crowd Lu	"He-R"	Lin Sheng Xiang – "To Have, or Not to Have"; Fire EX. – "Southbound Night Bus"; Lo Ta-yu – "Guan Yin Shan"; JJ Lin – "Little Big Us"	
2019	Jolin Tsai	"Womxnly"	"Millennia's Faith Undone (The Aeon's Wraith Version)" (from Millennia's Faith Undone (The Aeon's Wraith Version)) – Chthonic and Denise Ho; "To Be Together" (from L.O.V.E) – Eason Chan; "Core" (from 0) – Sandy Lam; "Seventeen" (from Seventeen) – S.H.E; "Newly Written Old Song" (from Newly Written Old Song) – Jonathan Lee; "Waves Wandering" (from Waves Wandering) – EggPlantEgg	
2020	Abao	"Thank You"	"Airplane Mode" (from Beyond Mediocrity) – 9m88 and Leo Wang; "Distant Journey" (from a Sun original Soundtrack) – Lin Sheng Xiang; "Without You" (from #osnrap) – OSN; "City Zoo" (from City Zoo) – G.E.M.; "Ghost Island" (from Newly Written Old Song) – Jonathan Lee; "Waves Wandering" (from Calling Asia) – Namewee and Dwagie; "City of Sadness" (from Stand Up Like A Taiwanese) – Fire EX.	
2021	Crowd Lu	"Your Name Engraved Herein"	"A Vacant Seat" (from Dear All) – Wanfang; "Bo Fu" (from Outta Body) – E.SO; "When Tomorrow Comes feat. ?te" (from tsu-pun) – Olivia Tsao and ?te; "Where I Lost Us" (from Easy Come, Easy Go) – Accusefive; "Embrace" (from Gain Strength) – Sangpuy; "Because Of You" (from Because Of You) – Mayday	
2022	EggPlantEgg	"Oh Love, You Are Much Greater Than I Imagined"	"Mountain of Doom" (from Mountain of Doom) – Ayugo Huang, Sangpuy; "Bluebirds" (from Depart) – Tanya Chua; "Dear Grandma" (from Have a Nice Day) – Waa Wei; "Fragile " (from Ghoscian) – Namewee, Kimberley Chen; "Red Scarf" (from Red Scarf) – WeiBird; "DEATH TRIP" (from DEATH TRIP) – ØZI feat. Soft Lipa; "Prototype" (from Gei) – Lala Hsu	
2023	Deserts Chang	"A Flash and How It Lasts"	"Like A Star" (from Gei) – Lala Hsu; "Silver Lining" (from Silver Lining) – Pei-Yu Hung; "Greatest Works of Art" (from Greatest Works of Art) – Jay Chou; "Daughters feat. Chunho" (from Mercury Retrograde) – Enno Cheng; "Semane sepi" (from Ita) – Kasiwa	
2024	Accusefive	"We Will Be Fine"	"Sabotage feat. Buddha Jump" (from Flow) – Faith Yang; "Solo Dance at Midnight" (from Human Condition) – Fire EX.; "Damn" (from The Clod) – No Party for Cao Dong; "The Landlord Upstairs (from Disguseted Performed By)" – MC Hotdog; "Tristesse" (from Tristesse) – A-Mei	
2025	Energy	"Friday Night"	"BUNUN" – QUEENDOM (performed by: Abus Tanapima); "Phone, Wallet, Keys, Cigarettes" – Amazing Show (performed by: Amazing Show, Crowd Lu); "phian-lâm-hong" – phian-lâm (performed by: Ming-Yo Hsieh); "Young Man" – AAA (performed by: Hyukoh & Sunset Rollercoaster); "Twenty Three" – The Dreamer (performed by: Khalil Fong); "Isha's Song" – Isha's Song (performed by: Eason Chan); "Je prends, je prends. Je vais voir." – Suí (performed by: Siri Lee)	
2026	A-Lin	"Happiness Is Singing"	Sam Yang – "In the Middle" (from Daily Diner); Ayal Komod – "Surfer's Love Story" (from Go With the Flow); Jolin Tsai – "Pleasure" (from Pleasure); Salsa Chen – "Old Wings" (from Old Wings); Chen Hsien-ching – "If We Can Be Happy Happy Every Day, Who Wants to Be Sad" (from If We Can Be Happy Happy Every Day, Who Wants to Be Sad); A-Mei – "My Existence Is to Love You" (from My Existence Is to Love You)	

== Category facts ==
Most wins

Rank	1st	2nd
Artist	Jolin Tsai	Jacky Cheung; Jay Chou; Jonathan Lee
Total wins	3 wins	2 wins

Most nominations

Rank	1st	2nd	3rd
Artist	Jonathan Lee	Jay ChouMayday	Jody Chiang; A-Mei; Jolin Tsai
Total nominations	6 nominations	5 nominations	4 nominations
