= Golden Melody Award for Best New Artist =

Achievement award given by Taiwan's Ministry of Culture

The Golden Melody Award for Best New Artist (Chinese: 金曲獎最佳新人獎) is an award given by the Ministry of Culture of Taiwan. It was first presented in 1990 as New Artist Award.

== Winners and nominees ==
=== New Artist Award (1990–1996) ===
Year	Recipient	Nominees	Ref
January 1990	Sky Wu	Samuel Tai; Ma Yu-fen; Chang Yu-sheng; Cheng Tung-fang	
October 1990	Tiger Huang	Lee Ming-yi; Lin Yun; Chiang Nien-ting; Huang Xin-mao	
1991	Huo Cheng-chi	Lam Lei; Chou Tzu-han; Shin Lung; Huang Yi	
1992	Tsai Hsiao-hu	Sean Lin	
1993	Sui Hao-ping	Yu Chih-cheng; Hsu Shih-chen; Yuan Yu-min; Huang Ching-chen (Huang Si-ting)	
1994	Blues Chen - Bu Yao Rang Wo Zai Ai Ni Zai Xiang Ni (不要讓我再愛你再想你)	Chen Ya-lan - Wu Qing Ren You Qing Tian (無情人有情天); Chen Jui-yi - Shui Zhong Yue (水中月)	
1996	Liu Yi-chun - Zhen Xin Bian Wu Xin (真心變無心)	Mavis Fan - Talking to Myself (自言自語); Jonathan Chang - Do You Still Remember Me (還記得我嗎); Lesley Lee - Feel Like To (好想好好)	

=== Best New Artist (1997–2003) ===
Year	Recipient	Nominees	Ref
1997	Julia Peng - Say Something True (說真心話)	Lee Yu-huan and Suya (DMDM) - Falling In Love Is My Mistake (愛上你只是我的錯); Eddie Huang - Lian Lian Qing Shen (戀戀情深); Phoebe Huang - Give Me All Your Love (愛都給我)	
1998	David Tao - David Tao	Shunza - Shunza; Power Station - Ruthless Love Letter (無情的情書); Daniel Chan - The Heart Already Knows (心有獨鍾); Shan Feng Dian Huo - Hidden (深藏不露)	
1999	Shino Lin - Shino	Cheer Chen - Think Twice (讓我想一想); Denise Juan - Trace (跟蹤); Ze Hwang - Best Before (賞味期限); Liu Ching - Ching Light (青睞)	
2000	Samingad - Voice of Puyuma (太陽 風 草原的聲音)	Ciacia Ho - Perfect Woman (完美小姐); Showlen Maya - You Qing Ren (友情人); Maggie Chiang - I Love Faye Wong (我愛王菲); Tanya Chua - Tanya	
2001	Stefanie Sun - Yan Zi	Jay Chou - Jay; Penny Tai - Penny; Freya Lim - Freya; Christine Fan - FanFan's World	
2002	Jeffrey Kung - 01	S.H.E - Girls' Dorm; Yi Jet Qi - Yi Jet Qi (易桀齊); Peggy Hsu - Balloon (汽球); Stella - Waiting (等)	
2003	Evonne Hsu - To Be Happy	Z-Chen - May I Love You; A-do - Night Fall (天黑); Van Fan - Van; Lisa - More Lisa	
2004	JJ Lin - Music Voyager	Canace Wu - Wo De Yin Yue Yong Chuang Tian Ya (我的音樂勇闖天涯); A-Sun - Love Hurts (受了點傷); Song Yue Ting - Life's a Struggle; Renée Chen - Who's Renee	

=== Popular music - Best Mandarin New Artist (2005) ===
Year	Recipient	Nominees	Ref
2005	F.I.R. - F.I.R.-Fairyland in Reality	Queenie Lin - Martian (我是火星人); Daniel Chang - Daniel Chang; Yida Huang - Undefinable (無法定義 黃義達)	

=== Popular music - Best New Artist (2006) ===
Year	Recipient	Nominees	Ref
2006	Rynn Lim - Rynn Lim	Liu Yun-le - Yun-le (允樂專輯); Alex Lee - Pray (祈禱); Rebecca Hsu - Be Myself (做自己)	

=== Most Promising New Artist (2008) ===
Year	Recipient	Nominees	Ref
2007	Europa Huang - Over the Way	Zhang Xianzi - Xian Zi (首張同名專輯); A-Lin - Lovelorn, Not Guilty (失戀無罪); Evan Yo - 19	

=== Best New Artist (2009-present) ===
Year	Recipient	Nominees	Ref
2008	Debbie Hsiao - Shuo's Map Album (碩一碩的流浪地圖)	Olivia Yan - Silly Child (傻孩子); Connie Lu - Moment of Love (心動的時刻); Lo Si-rong - Everyday (每日); Chris Wu - Stay Up (徹夜未眠); Wow - The Big Hits (頭號人物)	
2009	Crowd Lu - 100 Ways of Living (100種生活)	Rachel Liang - Love Poem (愛的詩篇); Hsiao Hung-jen - Hsiao Hung-jen (蕭閎仁首張同名創作專輯); Joanna Wang - Start from Here; Jam Hsiao - Jam Hsiao; Yoga Lin - Mystery Guest	
2010	Lala Hsu - Lala Hsu	Shadya Lan - The Secret (秘密 1號創作專輯); A-Chord - Nothing But A Chord (雖然很芭樂); Alisa Galper - Alisa Galper; Soft Lipa - Winter Sweet	
2011	William Wei - William Wei	Io - Even If You Win Today, So What? (就算今天贏了 明天又會如何？); Yen-j - Thank You For Your Greatness (謝謝你的美好); Matzka - Matzka	
2012	Ilid Kaolo - My Carefree Life (輕快的生活)	Fiona Wu - I'm Only Fiona Wu (我只是吳南穎); The Girl and the Robots - Miss November; A-fu - That's How It Is (原來如此！！); Jess Lee - Thank You My Love	
2013	Miss Ko - Knock Out (葛屁)	Amuyi Lu - We Don't Talk; Sangpuy - Dalan; Ann - The Catcher in the Rye (麥田捕手); Jia Jia - Unforgettable (忘不記); Eve Ai - If You Love Me (如果你愛我); O-Kai Singers - A Cappella	
2014	Li Ronghao - Model (模特)	Jacky Chen - Sam Ts'ap Tho'ng (30 出頭); Simhanada - 1/84000; Funky Brothers - Funky Brothers (放客兄弟); Xiao Ren - Kiddo Kingdom (小人國); Koala Liu - Embrace (擁抱你)	
2015	Boxing - Boxing	Adrian Fu - Good Morning, Hard City; Shi Shi - Girls; Chen Hui-ting - 21 Grams (21克); Wang Hui-chu - A Voyage of Vera (少女維拉)	
2016	Eli Hsieh - Progress Reports (查理)	Hello Nico - Familiar Desolation (熟悉的荒涼); Kowen - Ni Bu Zhen De Xiang Liu Lang (你不真的想流浪); Yoyo Sham - Here; Chang and Lee - Chang and Lee (張三李四); Su Yunying - Ming Ming (冥明); Xiong Zai - ∞ Infinity (∞ 無限)	
2017	No Party for Cao Dong - The Servile (醜奴兒)	Flux - Pluralism (多元觀點); Mr. Miss - Mr. Miss (先生小姐); Shio - Abstract Painting (抽象圖); Erika - I Am Erika; Gong - Gong	
2018	EggPlantEgg - Cartoon Character (卡通人物)	Leon Zheng - When I Leave Taipei (忽然有一天，我離開了台北); J.Sheon - J.Sheon (街巷); Jerry Li - Stay Sober (醒著不醉); Janice Yan - I Have Myself (我有我自己); Paige Su - We Are All Lonely Souls (我們都是寂寞的); Dean Ting - The Journal (神經誌)	
2019	ØZI - ØZI: The Album	The Fur. – Town; Evangeline Wong – Wilder (框不住的艷薇); Karencici – Sha Yan; Bisiugroup – King of Light (電火王); Angry Youth – Campus Romance ( Lexie Liu – 2029	
2020	Chih Siou - Elephant In The Room (房間裡的大象)	9m88 – Beyond Mediocrity (平庸之上); JADE – Nemo; OSN – #osnrap; Accusefive – Somewhere in Time, I Love You (我肯定在幾百年前就說過愛你); Goat – FANTASIA (幻想曲); Midi Yang – Bad Midi (壞米仔)	
2021	?te - A Bedroom of One's Own	YELLOW – YELLOW FICTION (浮世擊); heat sketch – Yuba Youth (豆皮少年); Howard Lee – Diamond In The Rough; aoi – Ū lí ê kòo-sū (有你的故事); Bestards – The Fool (愚者); Yo Lee – If Only You Could Love Me (如果你也愛我就好了)	
2022	Collage - MEmento·MORI	Tsng-kha-lâng – Iā-Kuan Sûn-Tiûnn (夜官巡場); L8ching – Dive & Give; Modern Cinema Master – Where Are We Now (告訴我他們都在本來的什麼地方); Greg Hsu – Greg Hsu (許光漢); Matt Lv – Fresh Soul (新鮮的靈魂); Haezee – LOVE MAZE	
