= Taipei Family =

Taipei Family (Chinese: 住左邊住右邊) is a Taiwanese sitcom about antics of two families living together in the same apartment dealing with issues such as love and friendship.

Directed by Wang Weizhong (producer), it ran for four seasons and aired from 2005 to 2006. Kuo Tzu-chien and Yu Ziyu portray a married couple.

== Cast ==
- Kuo Tzu-chien
- Yu Ziyu
- Lin Mei-hsiu
- Huang Anqi
- He Yi-hang
- Yan Jiale
- Jiu Kong
- Abao
- Ge Weiru
- Xu Jiehui
- Andy Chen
- Zhang Zhaozhi
- Lin Weiheng
- Li Xizhen

Guest stars included Janel Tsai, Lin Jiaqi, Beatrice Hsu, and Chang Ho-chirl.
