= Chen Hsiao-yun =

Taiwanese singer

Chen Hsiao-yun 陳小雲
- Born: 陳雲霞; 1958 (age 67–68); Taichung, Taiwan
- Occupations: Singer, Buddhist nun
- Instrument: Vocals
- Works: "Dancing Lady" (舞女) "Cheater of Love! I Ask You" (愛情的騙子！我問你) "Romance Cha Cha" (愛情恰恰) "Infatuated Flower" (癡情花) "Liquor's Talks" (燒酒話) "Don't Lose Hope" (免失志) "Reflections In The Cup" (杯中影) "Singing With Love" (歌聲戀情) "Bitter Romantic Dreams" (苦戀夢) "Wait A Minute" (等一下呢) "Lover Goes With Someone Else" (愛人跟人走)
- Labels: Jima Recording（1985–1993） Fanfare Records（1994） Lui Kwan General Records（1999）

Chen Hsiao-yun (Chinese: 陳小雲; pinyin: Chén Xiǎoyún; Pe̍h-ōe-jī: Tân Sió-hûn; 1958–), real name Chen Yun Xia (陳雲霞), is a Taiwanese Hokkien pop music singer. She graduated from the provincial Taichung Home Economics and Commercial High School and worked as an accountant. When she was young, she co-founded a coffee shop with a friend, and while working there, she was already noted for her frequent singing; she was later promoted and selected to sing in a hotel in Taichung. and it was not until she was invited by a record company that she began her career as a singer. She has now retired from singing and has ordained as a Buddhist nun.

== Performing Experience ==
In 1985, Chen was invited by Jima Recording (Chinese: 吉馬唱片) to record her debut album "Dancing Lady" (舞女; Bú-lú), which became a big hit. The hit song "Dancing Lady" was a popular song and was sung all over the streets. However, as martial law was still in effect, the song's themes of night life in Taiwan's night markets and its depiction of the sad situation of paid dance parners was controversial. The Nationalist Government's Police Headquarters and the Bureau of Information Technology of the Executive Yuan thought that these songs depicting liquor and dance halls would corrupt society and encourage "bad abits", and therefore banned all songs with those themes. It was not until 1987 that Taiwan declared the lifting of martial law that songs such as 'Dancing Lady' saw the light of day, and Chen officially joined Jima (Golden Horse) Records as a contract singer to launch her singing career. Nevertheless, it would become a factor in the revival of Taiwanese Hokkien pop music.

Since then, Chen has released a number of best-selling records and albums on Jima Recording, including 1986's "Don't Lose Hope" (免失志; Bián Sit-chì). "Don't Lose Hope" was one of the songs in the movie A Better Tomorrow. With the help of the movie, the album "A Better Tomorrow" sold even better than "Dancing Lady", and in 1990, during the presidential election, she released the album "There's Always a Chance to Become the President", the title track of which was "There's Always a Chance to Become the President" (做總統有機會), which was shortlisted for the Best Female Vocalist Award at the 2nd Golden Melody Awards, making her a big hit at the same time.

From 1991 to 1993, she released several "Taiwanese Bestsellers Compilation Albums", and in 1992, she released the album "Romance Cha Cha" (愛情恰恰; Ài-chîng Chhiah-chhiah), for which she won the Best Female Vocalist Award for Dialect Song at the 4th Golden Melody Awards, making her the first female singer in the history of the Golden Melody Awards to win the award for a dance song, and climbed up to the peak of her career. In the following year, she won the Best Female Vocalist for Dialect Songs at the 5th Golden Melody Awards with her album "Bitter Romantic Dreams" (苦戀夢), and she is the first female singer to win the Golden Melody Awards for Individual Vocal Performance.

At the end of 1993, Chen Xiao Yun began to gradually retire from singing and stopped releasing albums. During the six years from 1993 to 1999, he usually only sang in TV programs, including the TV variety show "The Fantastic Brothers" (龍兄虎弟) hosted by Fei Yu-ching and Chang Fei, and "Flying to the Rainbow" (飛上彩虹) hosted by Fong Fei-fei, etc. In particular, in 1995, Chen Xiao Yun did a rare impersonation of Pauline Lan's vocal performance of "My Tenderness is Only Seen by You"(Mandarin: 我的溫柔只有你看得見) in the CCTV variety show "Diamond Stage" (鑽石舞台). In 1999, she released her last album, "Love to Death" (愛卡慘死), released by Lui Kwan Chong Records (雷群將唱片), and then officially retired from performing. She made one appearance in Singapore's "Golden Night Show" (黃金之夜表演秀), but her whereabouts are unknown.

Chen is a unique singer and likes to sing with swinging dance moves and gestures, Fei Yu-ching imitated Chen Xiao Yun's dance moves in the show "The Fantastic Brothers".

According to Chen's past friends such as He Yi-hang and Fang Chun (方駿), she loves practicing yoga, was a yoga instructor, and is a cleanser.

In January 2025, according to Lotus Wang (王彩樺), a Taiwanese actress and friend of Chen Hsiao-yun, in a media interview, Chen has already ordained as a Buddhist nun.

== Album ==
Year	Album	Label
1985	Dancing Lady (舞女)	Jima Recording
1986	Chen Xiao Yun's Album – Dancer's Tale (陳小雲專輯—舞女外傳)	Jima Recording
1986	Chen Xiao Yun's Album – Singing With Love, Reflections in the Cup (陳小雲專輯—歌聲戀情‧杯中影)	Jima Recording
1986	Chen Xiao Yun's Album – Folk Songs 1 (陳小雲民謠篇一)	Jima Recording
1986	Chen Xiao Yun's Album – Don't Lose Hope (陳小雲專輯—免失志)	Jima Recording
1987	Chen Xiao Yun's Album – Folk Songs 2 (陳小雲民謠篇二)	Jima Recording
1987	Chen Xiao Yun – What Do You Want? (陳小雲—欲如何)	Jima Recording
1988	Chen Xiao Yun – Cheater of Love! I Ask You (陳小雲專輯—愛情的騙子！我問你》	Jima Recording
1989	Chen Xiao Yun – A Handful of Love, Bicycle Love (陳小雲國語專輯—一把情種‧自行車之戀》	Jima Recording
1989	Chen Xiao Yun – Bachelor (陳小雲國語專輯—單身貴族)	Jima Recording
1990	Chen Xiao Yun – There's Always a Chance to Become the President (陳小雲專輯—做總統有機會)	Jima Recording
1990	Chen Xiao Yun – Taiwanese Bestsellers 1 (陳小雲台語暢銷輯1)	Jima Recording
1990	Chen Xiao Yun – Taiwanese Bestsellers 2 (陳小雲台語暢銷輯2)	Jima Recording
1990	Chen Xiao Yun – Infatuated Flower (陳小雲CD專輯3—癡情花)	Jima Recording
1990	Chen Xiao Yun – Liquor's Talks, Moonlight Lovesickness Song (陳小雲CD專輯4—燒酒話‧月夜相思曲)	Jima Recording
1992	Chen Xiao Yun – Romance Cha Cha (陳小雲—愛情恰恰)	Jima Recording
1993	Chen Xiao Yun – Bitter Romantic Dreams (陳小雲—苦戀夢)	Jima Recording
1993	Million Gold Songs 1, Chen Xiao Yun – Romance Cha Cha, Liquor's Talks (百萬金曲1,陳小雲—愛情恰恰‧燒酒話)	Jima Recording
1993	Million Gold Songs 1, Chen Xiao Yun – Bitter Romantic Dreams, Don't Lose Hope (百萬金曲2,陳小雲—苦戀夢‧免失志)	Jima Recording
1994	Chen Xiao Yun – True Love is All Deceptive (陳小雲—真情真愛攏騙人)	Fanfare Records
1999	Love to Death (愛卡慘死)	Lui Kwan General Records

== Award record ==
Year	Nominee / work	Award	Result
1990	There's a chance to be president	The 2nd Golden Melody Awards. Best Chinese Female Singer	Nominated
1992	Romance Cha Cha	The 4th Golden Melody Awards, Best Taiwanese Female Singer	Won
1993	Bitter Dreams	The 5th Golden Melody Awards, Best Female Vocalist for a Dialect Song	Won
