= Sky Wu =

Taiwanese singer (born 1966)

- Born: Wu Szu-kai; 23 July 1966 (age 59); Yonghe, Taipei County, Taiwan
- Genres: Mandopop
- Occupation: Singer-songwriter
- Years active: 1986–present

Chinese name
- Traditional Chinese: 伍思凱
- Simplified Chinese: 伍思凯
Transcriptions
Standard Mandarin
- Hanyu Pinyin: Wǔ Sīkǎi
- Gwoyeu Romatzyh: Wuu Sykae
- Wade–Giles: Wu^{3} Szu^{1}-k'ai^{3}
- IPA: [ù sɨ́kʰàɪ]

Sky Wu (born 23 July 1966) is a Taiwanese Mandopop singer.

He began singing in 1986, and has won himself two Golden Melody Awards, Best New Artist in 1990, and Best Mandarin Male Vocalist in 2004. His signature song, "Give My Special Love to a Special You" (特別的愛給特別的你), won the Best Recording Award in 1991.
