= Henry Hsu (singer) =

Taiwanese singer (born 1987)

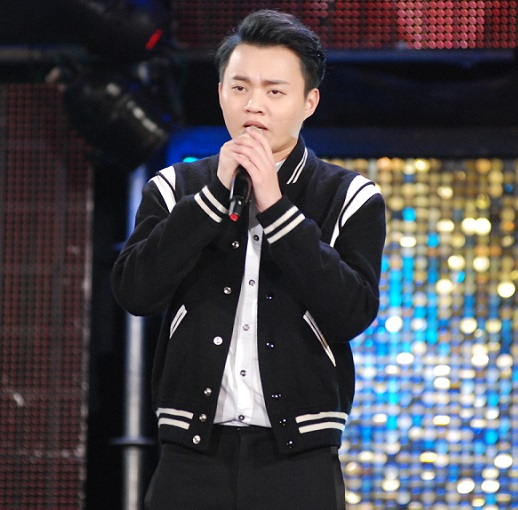
Hsu on the set of Super Night Club in December 2015

Henry Hsu (Chinese: 許富凱; born 17 September 1987) is a Taiwanese singer of Hokkien pop.

Hsu was born in Kaohsiung on 17 September 1987. His parents frequently watched the Chu Ke-liang Cabaret Show, where young Henry heard several Hokkien oldies. Hsu's father served as his singing coach, and his parents entered him into several singing competitions as a child. Hsu's professional career began in 2010, after an appearance on the television series Future Superstar.

Hsu's albums include Most Loved (2011), Writing Your Song (2012), and Yicunzhenxin [An Inch of True Heart] (2014).

Hsu's subsequent Hokkien albums have been shortlisted for Golden Melody Awards. Mend the Dreams was nominated for the Golden Melody Award for Album of the Year and Best Taiwanese Album during the 2018 award ceremony, and Hsu himself received a nomination for Best Male Taiwanese Singer. Another of Hsu's Hokkien works, I Am Not As Happy As You Tonight, garnered him a second nomination for Best Male Taiwanese Singer in the 2019 Golden Melody Award ceremony. At the 32nd Golden Melody Awards in 2021, Hsu's album Ten secured a nomination for Best Hokkien Album, and his third as Best Male Taiwanese Singer. Hsu won the latter award.
