= Tiger Huang =

Taiwanese singer

- 黃小琥
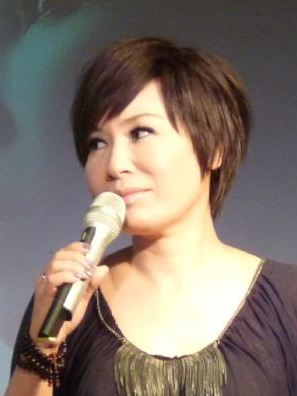
- Born: 黃春鳳; 21 June 1963 (age 62); Yancheng, Kaohsiung, Taiwan
- Occupation: Singer
- Awards: Golden Melody Awards – Best New Artist; 1990

Tiger Huang (Chinese: 黃小琥; pinyin: Huáng Xiǎohǔ; born 21 June 1963) is a Taiwanese singer.

She is known for her unique voice and cover versions of songs by other artists. Huang was named Best New Artist at the 1990 Golden Melody Awards. She first performed at the Taipei live house EZ5 when it opened in 1990, and held frequent shows there.

== Awards and nominations ==
Year	Award	Category	Nominated work	Result
1990	2nd Golden Melody Awards	Best New Artist	—N/a	Won
