= Sun Sheng Xi =

Taiwanese-South Korean singer, songwriter and record producer

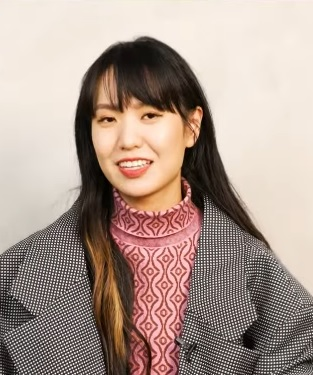
- Sun in October 2022
- Born: 13 November 1990 (age 35); Gangneung, Gangwon-do, South Korea
- Citizenship: Taiwan (by descent)
- Education: Yonsei University – English Major
- Occupations: Singer; songwriter; record producer
- Years active: 2013–present
- Musical career
- Also known as: Shi Shi
- Genres: Pop; R&B
- Instruments: Vocals; guitar; piano
- Label: Rock Records

Chinese name
- Traditional Chinese: 孫盛希
- Simplified Chinese: 孙盛希
- Hanyu Pinyin: Sūn Shèngxī
- Hokkien POJ: Sun Sēng-hi

Alternative name
- Chinese: 希希
- Hanyu Pinyin: xī xī
- Hokkien POJ: Hi-hi

Sun Sheng Xi (Chinese: 孫盛希; born 13 November 1990), also known as Shi Shi (Chinese: 希希), is a Taiwanese-South Korean singer, songwriter and record producer.

In 2019, Sun won the Golden Melody Award for Best Mandarin Album for her fourth studio album, Shi's Journey. It was also her first win at the music awards.

== Life and career ==
Sun was born in Korea but later moved to Taiwan in order to pursue her music career. Sun participated in season 2 of Chinese Million Star, and finished in 6th place. In 2015, she was nominated for Best New Artist at the 26th Golden Melody Awards.

== Discography ==
=== Studio albums ===
#	Title	Label	Released Date(s)	Tracklisting
1st	Girls	Rock Records	22 August 2014	Standard Edition: 1. 你的誰; 2. Girls; 3. 不該不該 Don't; 4. 沒有理由偽裝成理由 There is No Reason to Disguise; 5. 跟你住 Live With You; 6. Yes, I Do; 7. 瘋起來 Get Crazy (ft. Miss Ko); 8. 恆溫 Thermostatic; 9. 想想你也好 Think About You; 10. 是愛還是陪伴 Love/Companionship; Limited Edition: 1. 稀有恆溫 Rare Thermostatic; O2 First Snow Limited Edition Bonus Tracks: 1. 半婚迷; 2. 少一點天份 Less Talented
2nd	Between	Rock Records	23 December 2016	Standard Edition: 1. 非關愛情 Let's Talk About Love; 2. 三人舞 Triangle; 3. 單身≠失戀 Single ≠ Lovelorn; 4. 是他不配 He Isn't Worth It; 5. 塌下來 The Last Day; 6. 嫌疑 Suspicion; 7. Don't Panic; 8. 迷些路 Lost on the Way (ft. MATZKA); 9. 微笑帶過 Passing Smile; 10. Where Will You Go
3rd	Woman	Rock Records	6 July 2018	Standard Edition: 1. 分裂 Spilt; 2. 內疚 Guilty; 3. 原來你是這樣的人 So you such a person 4. 聽起來像藉口嗎？Sound like an excuse?; 5. We Can't Be Together?; 6. 自然凋謝 Wither Naturally; 7. 自我癒合 Self Healing; 8. 闖空門 Break into the void 9. 有多美麗 How Beautiful; 10. 很晚的晚安 Very late good night
4th	Shi's Journey	Rock Records	31 October 2018	
5th	Where is Shi?	Rock Records	18 December 2020	
6th	Boomerang	Rock Records	1 December 2023	

=== Singles ===
#	Single Name	Label	Released Date	Tracklisting
1st	不該不該 Don't	Rock Records	30 May 2014	1. 不該不該 Don't
2nd	Girls	Rock Records	30 May 2014	1. Girls
3rd	Stay With Me	Rock Records	25 May 2015	1. Stay With Me (Cover of Sam Smith)
4th	單身≠失戀 Single ≠ Lovelorn	Rock Records	24 June 2016	1. 單身≠失戀 Single ≠ Lovelorn
5th	迷些路 Lost on the Way	Rock Records	30 November 2016	1. 迷些路 Lost on the Way (ft.Matzka)
6th	是他不配/微笑帶過 He Isn't Worth It/Passing Smile	Rock Records	16 December 2016	1. 是他不配 He Isn't Worth It; 2. 微笑帶過 Passing Smile
7th	是他不配 He Isn't Worth It (DJ KOO Remix)	Rock Records	17 April 2017	1. 是他不配 He Isn't Worth It (DJ KOO Remix)
8th	很晚的晚安 A Late Goodnight	Rock Records	14 July 2017	1. 很晚的晚安 A Late Goodnight
9th	念夏 Summer Freeze	Rock Records	29 September 2017	1. 念夏 Summer Freeze
10th	Never Lose Your Smile	Rock Records	31 January 2018	1. Never Lose Your Smile (A Melody To Remember Chinese Promotional Song)
11th	另一個結局 A Different Ending	Rock Records	12 February 2018	1. 另一個結局 A Different Ending (Love Is in the Air Ending Theme Song)

== Filmography ==
=== Television series ===
Year	English title	Original title	Role	Notes
2021	Rainless Love in a Godless Land	無神之地不下雨	Papa' orip	Special appearance

=== Film ===
Year	English title	Original title	Role	Notes
2022	The Bad Guys	—N/a	Ms. Tarantula	Voice dub (Taiwanese version)

== Awards and nominations ==
Year	Award	Category	Nominated work	Result	Ref.
2015	26th Golden Melody Awards	Best New Artist	Girls	Nominated	
2019	30th Golden Melody Awards	Album of the Year	Shi's Journey	Nominated	
2019	30th Golden Melody Awards	Best Mandarin Album	Shi's Journey	Won	
2019	30th Golden Melody Awards	Best Female Mandarin Singer	Shi's Journey	Nominated	
2019	30th Golden Melody Awards	Best Arrangement	"Love Me Like a Liar"	Nominated	
2021	32nd Golden Melody Awards	Album of the Year	Where is Shi?	Nominated	
2021	32nd Golden Melody Awards	Best Mandarin Album	Where is Shi?	Nominated	
2021	32nd Golden Melody Awards	Best Female Mandarin Singer	Where is Shi?	Nominated	
2021	32nd Golden Melody Awards	Best Album Producer	Where is Shi?	Nominated	
2024	35th Golden Melody Awards	Best Female Mandarin Singer	Boomerang	Won	
