= Yo Lee =

Taiwanese singer-songwriter

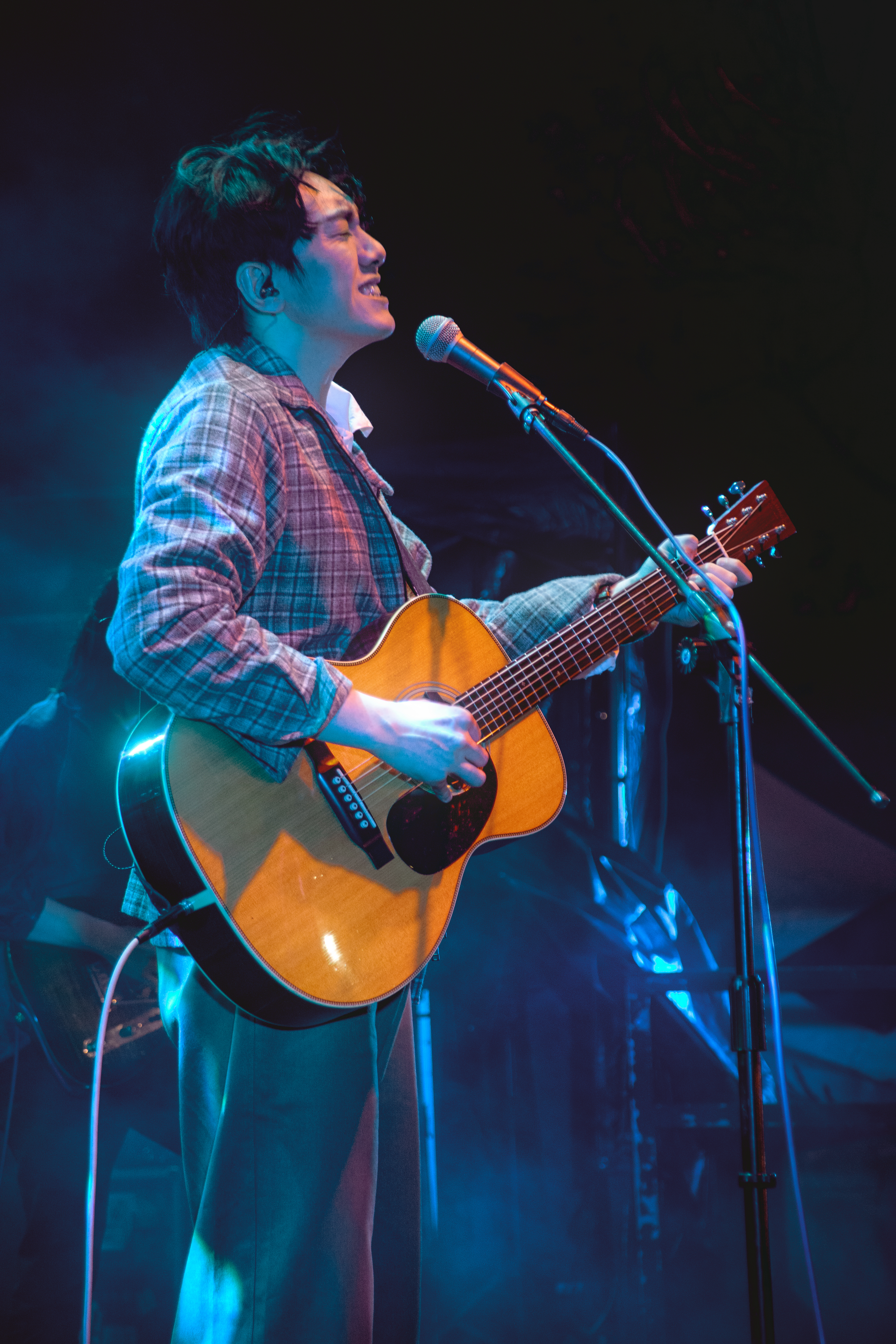
- Yo in 2022

Background information
- Born: September 2, 1989 (age 36); New Taipei City, Taiwan
- Genres: Mandopop
- Occupation: Singer-songwriter
- Instruments: voice; guitar
- Years active: 2018–present
- Label: HIM International Music
- Website: Yo Lee on Facebook

Chinese name
- Chinese: 李友廷
Transcriptions
Standard Mandarin
- Hanyu Pinyin: Lǐ Yǒutíng
Southern Min
- Hokkien POJ: Lí Iú-têng

Yo Lee (born Lee You-ting on September 2, 1989) is a Taiwanese singer-songwriter.

== Early life and education ==
Lee was born on September 2, 1989, in New Taipei City, Taiwan. He graduated from Shih Hsin University.

== Musical career ==
Lee won Jungle Voice, a Taiwanese singing competition, in 2019. His debut album, If Only You Could Love Me, was released in 2020. In August 2021, his 2020 album was nominated for Best New Artist in the 32nd Golden Melody Awards.

== Discography ==
- Find Me (2018)
- If Only You Could Love Me (2020)
