= 3rd Golden Melody Awards =

1991 Taiwanese music awards ceremony

- Date: 9 November 1991
- Location: Sun Yat-sen Memorial Hall, Taipei, Taiwan
- Hosted by: Ba Ge; Yvette Tsui

Television/radio coverage
- Network: CTV

The 3rd Golden Melody Awards ceremony (Chinese: 第三屆金曲獎) was held at the Sun Yat-sen Memorial Hall in Taipei on 9 November 1991.

== Winners and nominees ==
=== Song of the Year ===
- Marching Forward (向前走) — Lim Giong
  - 一枝擔竿
  - 凡人歌 — Jonathan Lee
  - 心肝寶貝
  - I Am A Little Bird (我是一隻小小鳥) — Chao Chuan
  - 故鄉
  - Crying Sand (哭砂) – Tracy Huang
  - 特別的愛給特別的你 — Sky Wu
  - 粉墨登場 — Chao Chuan
  - 嘸通嫌台灣

=== Best Male Vocalist Mandarin ===
- Chao Chuan
  - Jonathan Lee
  - Wakin Chau
  - Jacky Wu
  - Angus Tung

=== Best Female Vocalist Mandarin ===
- Sarah Chen
  - Wu Zhenhui (吴贞慧)
  - Kao Chin Su-mei
  - Sammi Kao
  - Cai Xingjuan (蔡幸娟)
