= Fire EX. =

Taiwanese punk rock band

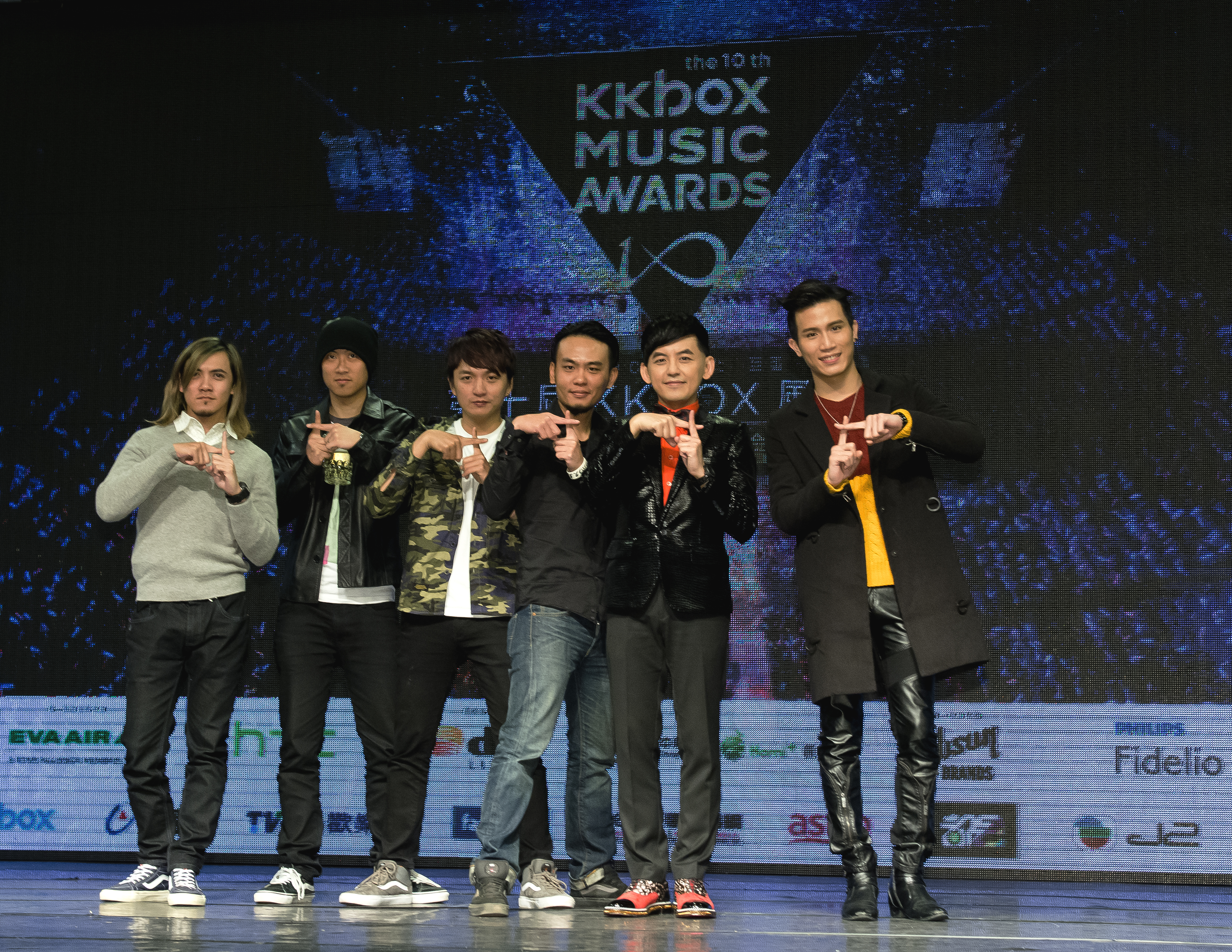
- Press conference before the 10th KKBOX Digital Music Chart. From left: Fire Extinguisher Orchestra (1st to 4th from left), Huang Zijiao, Chen Yanyun.

Background information
- Origin: Kaohsiung, Taiwan
- Genres: Punk rock
- Years active: 2000–present
- Label: Fireon Music
- Members: Sam, Orio, Pipi, KG

Chinese name
- Traditional Chinese: 滅火器
- Simplified Chinese: 灭火器
Transcriptions
Standard Mandarin
- Hanyu Pinyin: Mièhuǒqì
- Bopomofo: ㄇㄧㄝˋ ㄏㄨㄛˇ ㄑㄧˋ
- Wade–Giles: Mieh^{4}-huo^{3}-ch‘i^{4}
- IPA: [mjê.xwò.tɕʰî]
Yue: Cantonese
- Yale Romanization: Mihtfóhei
- Jyutping: Mit^{6}-fo^{2}-hei^{3}
- IPA: [mit̚˨.fɔ˧˥.hej˧]
Southern Min
- Hokkien POJ: Bia̍t-hóe-khì

Fire Ex. (Chinese: 滅火器; Pe̍h-ōe-jī: Bia̍t-hóe-khì) is a punk rock band from Kaohsiung, Taiwan, founded in 2000. They perform songs primarily sung in both Taiwanese Hokkien and Mandarin Chinese, with occasional songs in English and Japanese. The group consists of Sam (vocals), Orio (guitar), Pipi (bass), and KG (drums). The band is known for their social activism supporting Taiwanese independence and same-sex marriage.

During the Sunflower Student Movement in 2014, student activists occupying the Legislative Yuan frequently played their song "Goodnight, Taiwan" and asked them to write a new song for the movement. This led to the writing of "Island's Sunrise" (島嶼天光; Pe̍h-ōe-jī: Tó-sū Thiⁿ-kng), which became the unofficial anthem of the movement. The band played at SXSW in Austin, Texas in 2024.

== Awards ==
- Winner of the Song of the Year Award at the 26th Golden Melody Awards in 2015 for "Island's Sunrise"
- Nominated for the Best Band Award at the 25th Golden Melody Awards in 2014 for Goodbye! You!th
- Nominated for the Album of the Year Award at the 28th Golden Melody Awards in 2017 for Reborn
- Nominated for the Best Band Award at the 29th Golden Melody Awards in 2018 for Begin the Second Half
- Nominated for the Song of the Year Award at the 29th Golden Melody Awards in 2018 for "Southbound Night Bus"
- Nominated for the Producer of the Year (Single) at the 29th Golden Melody Awards in 2018 for "Southbound Night Bus"

== Discography ==
- Let's Go! (2007)
- A Man On The Sea (2009)
- Goodbye! You!th (2013)
- REBORN (2016)
- Stand Up Like A Taiwanese (2019)
- Unsung heroes (2020)
