= Tsai Hsiao-hu =

Tsai Hsiao-hu 蔡小虎
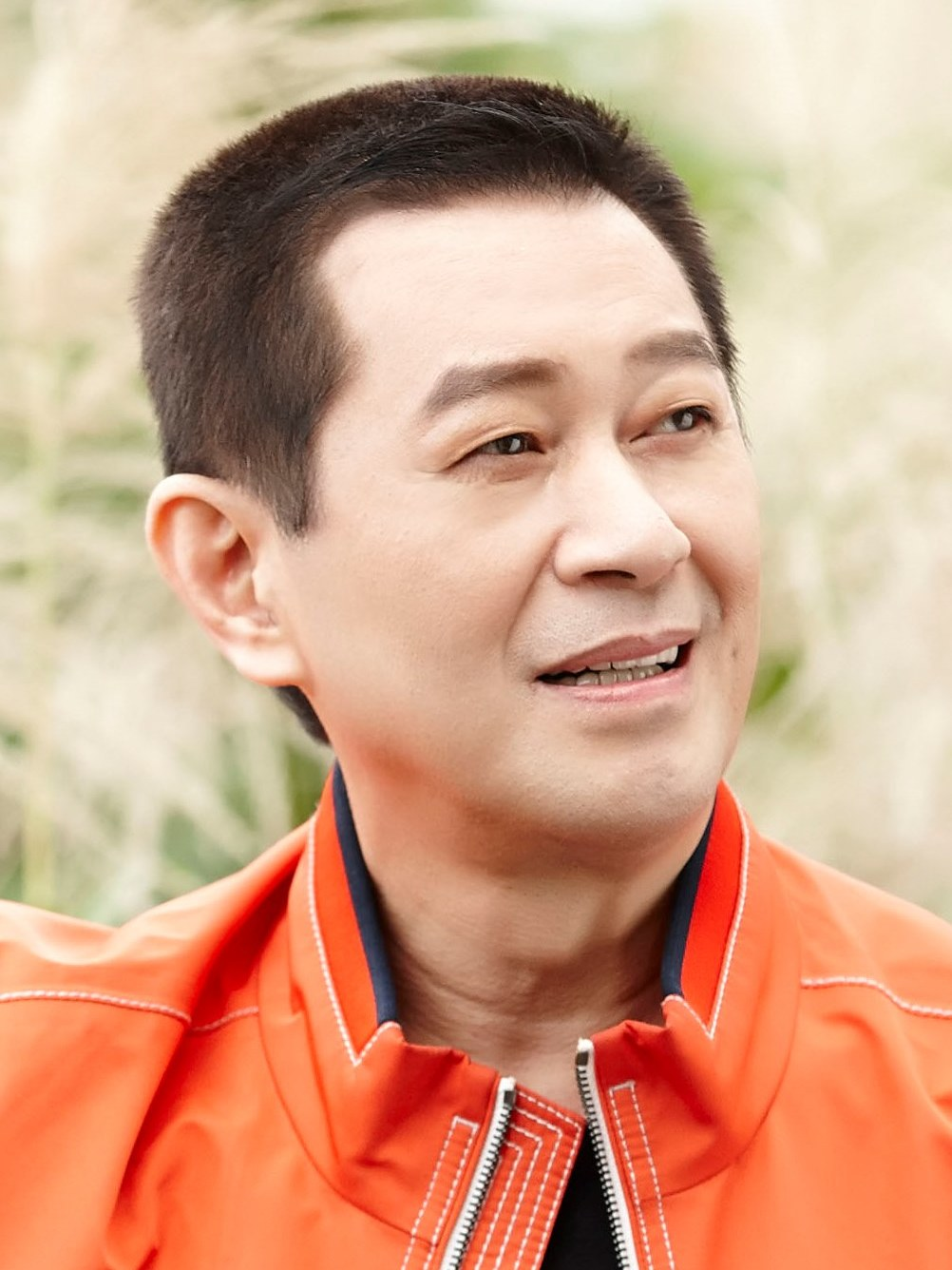
- Born: Tsai Chin-hu 蔡金虎; 25 October 1962 (age 63); Siaogang, Kaohsiung, Taiwan
- Occupation: Singer
- Years active: 1991–present
- Awards: Golden Melody Awards – Best New Artist; 1992
- Musical career
- Origin: Taiwan
- Genres: Hokkien pop
- Labels: HCM Music

Tsai Hsiao-hu (Chinese: 蔡小虎; pinyin: Cài Xiǎohǔ; born 25 October 1962) is a Taiwanese Hokkien pop singer. He is nicknamed Prince of Pork as he worked in a family-owned pork butchery.

Tsai made his debut in 1991, and the next year won Best New Artists at the fourth Golden Melody Awards in 1992. Subsequently, he has received multiple nominations for the Golden Melody Awards, including in 2003, when three nominees for Best Taiwanese Language Singer, Chris Hung, Wang Shih-hsien, and Tsai unofficially shared the award due to a clerical error.
