= 16th Golden Melody Awards =

Taiwanese music award ceremony in 2005

- Location: Kaohsiung Cultural Center, Taiwan
- Hosted by: Tao Ching-Ying; Patty Hou; Lin Chi-ling

Television/radio coverage
- Network: Azio TV

The 16th Golden Melody Awards were held on 28 May 2005 at the Kaohsiung Cultural Center in Kaohsiung, Taiwan.

== Summary ==
Sales of popular music had dropped more than 60 percent since its 1998 peak, leading to a few appeals during the night for people not to buy unlicensed goods.

Although Taiwanese singer Jay Chou started the evening with six nominations, he did not win in any of the categories.

During the presentation for the award of Best Male Mandarin Artist, Hong Kong actress Karen Mok could be heard announcing the winner as "Wang Lixing", combining the Chinese names for Leehom Wang (Chinese: 王力宏; pinyin: Wáng Lìhóng) and Stanley Huang (simplified Chinese: 黄立行; traditional Chinese: 黃立行; pinyin: Huáng Lìxíng). This mistake resulted in a confusion where Wang took the stage to receive the award without realizing that Mok had made the mistake. The actual award was meant for Huang, who was a relative newcomer compared to the more popular Wang. The mistake was partially blamed on Mok's Cantonese language background, which pronounces the two characters for "Wang" (Chinese: 王) and "Huang" (Chinese: 黃) as "Wong" with the same tone. The second character in both artist's names also had the same tone in Mandarin, complicating the process because the third part of the name was nearly drowned out by the audience. Wang won the award the following year at the 17th Golden Melody Awards.

=== Special segments ===
Leehom Wang and Jay Chou were interviewed and asked to comment on each other.

Chou also performed a medley piano battle with Nan Quan Mama group member Yuhao Zhan. The medley included segments from Prelude and Fugue No. 2 in C minor in Book 1 of Bach's Well-Tempered Clavier, a capriccio of Chou's song "Reverse Scales" (Chinese: 逆鱗; pinyin: nìlín), and the theme song of Super Mario Bros.
