= 11th Golden Melody Awards =

Taiwanese music award ceremony in 2000

- Location: Xinyi, Taipei, Taiwan
- Hosted by: Chang Hsiao Yen; Tao Ching-Ying

Television/radio coverage
- Network: TVBS-G

The 11th Golden Melody Awards ceremony was held at the Sun Yat-sen Memorial Hall in Xinyi District, Taipei, Taiwan, on 28 April 2000. Aboriginal music featured prominently in this award ceremony.
