= Tracy Huang =

Taiwanese singer

Tracy Huang (Chinese: 黃鶯鶯, Huang Yingying; born 29 August 1951) is a Taiwanese singer.

Huang began her career in music with the Thunderbird Choir, alongside Su Rui. After she left the group, Huang spent two years in Taichung, at an American military base, where she learned and performed in English. Huang released her first album in 1974 under the stage name Huang Lu-yi. She later adopted the English name Tracy Huang. Known primarily for her Mandopop songs, Huang has also sung in Cantonese and released several English-language song covers. At the 27th Golden Melody Awards in 2016, Huang received the Golden Melody Award for lifetime contributions.
