= 10th Golden Melody Awards =

Taiwanese music award ceremony in 1999

- Date: 30 April 1999
- Location: Sun Yat-sen Memorial Hall, Taipei, Taiwan
- Hosted by: Chang Hsiao-yen; Matilda Tao

Television/radio coverage
- Network: TVBS Entertainment Channel

The 10th Golden Melody Awards ceremony (Chinese: 第十屆金曲獎) was held at the Sun Yat-sen Memorial Hall in Taipei on April 30, 1999.
