= Jody Chiang =

Taiwanese popular singer

Jody Chiang 江蕙
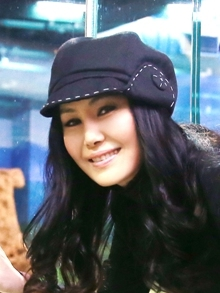
- Born: Jiang Shuhui (江淑惠); 1 September 1961 (age 65); Xikou, Chiayi County, Taiwan
- Occupations: Singer, songwriter
- Years active: 1981–2015; 2024–present
- Family: Chiang Shu-na
- Awards: Golden Melody Awards – Best Mandarin Female Artist (regardless of language); 1990 Best Album (regardless of language); 1993; Best Dialect Female Artist; 2000–2002; Best Taiwanese Female Artist; 2003; Best Taiwanese Album; 2005–2006, 2009, 2011 Special Contributions; 2015
- Musical career
- Also known as: Jiang Hui, Second Sister (二姐), Queen of Taiwanese Music (臺灣歌后)
- Origin: Taiwan
- Genre: Hokkien pop
- Instruments: Vocals; guitar

- Jody Chiang
- Hàn-jī: 江蕙
- Pe̍h-ōe-jī: Kang Hūi
- Tâi-lô: Kang Huī
- Bbánpìng: Gang Hûi

Birth name
- Hàn-jī: 江淑惠
- Pe̍h-ōe-jī: Kang Siok-hūi
- Tâi-lô: Kang Siok-huī
- Bbánpìng: Gang Siok-hûi

Jody Chiang or Jiang Hui (Chinese: 江蕙; pinyin: Jiāng Huì; Pe̍h-ōe-jī: Kang Hūi), born Jiang Shuhui (Chinese: 江淑惠; Pe̍h-ōe-jī: Kang Siok-hūi), is a Taiwanese singer. She rose to prominence in the 1980s for her lyrical ballads and established herself as the leading figure in Hokkien pop. Following a cancer diagnosis in 2015, she announced her retirement that same year, but returned to performing in 2024 after her recovery.

== Early career ==
Chiang's mother was a food vendor and her father a glove puppeteer. She grew up in a poor family and quit school at the age of ten to begin singing at warehouses and bars in Beitou, Taipei. She started her commercial singing career in 1981 with a Japanese language album, and was signed to Country Records two years later. Chiang held her first concert in April 2008. The singer has released 60 albums and won thirteen Golden Melody Awards over her career. Chiang is known as "Second Sister" amongst her fans, because she is the second eldest of four siblings. Chris Hung and Chiang are known as the King and Queen of Taiwanese pop.

== Farewell concerts ==
Chiang announced on 2 January 2015 that she was going to perform 16 farewell concerts before retiring afterwards. Tickets to her final performances sold out quickly. The concert promoter, Kuang Hong Arts Management, faced protests by Chiang's fans and eventually announced nine additional performances only to see those tickets sell out in thirty minutes. The first farewell concert was staged at Taipei Arena on 27 July. The final concert of Chiang's career took place at Kaohsiung Arena on 13 September, and featured a retirement ceremony in which she locked a microphone in a box and threw the key into the crowd. The concerts held were recorded and sold as a DVD, released in October 2016.

== Personal life ==
Chiang is the second eldest of four siblings, three sisters and one brother. In 2009, she was reported to be chased for large amounts of debt due to her eldest sister's gambling problem. Chiang's younger sister Chiang Shu-na is also a singer.
