= 9th Golden Melody Awards =

Taiwanese music award ceremony in 1998

- Date: 29 May 1998
- Location: Sun Yat-sen Memorial Hall, Taipei, Taiwan
- Hosted by: Chang Hsiao-yen; Matilda Tao

Television/radio coverage
- Network: TVBS Entertainment Channel

The 9th Golden Melody Awards ceremony (Chinese: 第九屆金曲獎) was held at the Sun Yat-sen Memorial Hall in Taipei on May 29, 1998.
