= Pan Mei-chen =

- 潘美辰
- Pan in 2008 und interview Photographer:cash
- Born: 30 June 1969 (age 57); Banqiao, Taipei County, Taiwan
- Occupations: Singer; songwriter
- Years active: 1988–present
- Musical career
- Genre: Mandopop

Chinese name
- Chinese: 潘美辰
Transcriptions
Standard Mandarin
- Hanyu Pinyin: Pān Měichén

Pan Mei-chen (Chinese: 潘美辰; pinyin: Pān Měi chén; born 30 June 1969) is a Taiwanese singer-songwriter who achieved success in the 1980s.

== Music career ==
Born on 30 June 1969 in Taiwan. Her recording career started in 1987, and she has produced many albums over the years. Her talents range from songwriting to playing various instruments to performing. She is popular not only in her native country but in Singapore, mainland China, Hong Kong, Malaysia, and other parts of Southeast Asia.

After the 921 earthquake in Taiwan in 1999, Pan recorded the hit song "I Want a Home" (我想有個家) to raise awareness for victims of the disaster.

In 1992, Pan was secretly filmed by Taiwan Television and the images of her in a lesbian bar were broadcast together with an interview to imply that she was a lesbian. There was an open letter written in her defence which was signed by leading figures in the arts and the media. The objection was to the invasion of her privacy and eventually the TV station apologized. This reaction is seen as a milestone in homosexual rights and respect in Taiwan.

In 2002, Pan opened a musical academy in Taichung. The academy teaches music and as a platform for a career in entertainment.

Though her career has waned since the late 1990s, she released albums in 2003 and 2006.

In 2015, she was appearing to a strong audience of 1,400 at Resorts World Theatre in Singapore.

== Personal life ==
Her favorite band is Guns N' Roses. Growing up, she had a reputation as a tomboy. In 2017, she came out as bisexual.

== Awards ==
- 1987: her debut creative song "悔" (Regrets) won the 1st Taiwan Youth Creative Folk Contest
- 1988: Best New Singer Award of the Year of Taiwan from the China Times Evening News
- 1990: "I Want a Home" won the Best Song Award of the Year of the 1st Golden Melody Awards
- 1991: Best Singer Award by CCTV Energetic 28 (活力28), making her the first Taiwan singer to win the award
- 1994: Top Ten Idol Award of the Year, ranked 5th; the only female singer in the list
- 1994: nominated as Most Popular Female Singer in the 2nd 933 Golden Melody Awards in Singapore
- 1996: her album The True Pan Mei Chen was nominated as Best Album of the Year in the Golden Melody Awards
