= Yeh Hsien-hsiu =

Taiwanese politician and singer

Yeh Hsien-hsiu MLY
- 葉憲修
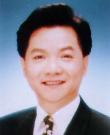

Member of the Legislative Yuan
- In office 1 February 1999 – 31 January 2002
- Constituency: Taipei County 1
- In office 1 February 1993 – 31 January 1996
- Constituency: Taipei County

Personal details
- Born: 1 June 1948 (age 77) Taibao, Chiayi, Taiwan
- Party: Democratic Non-Partisan Alliance
- Profession: Singer
- Awards: Golden Melody Award for Best Song of the Year (1996)

Yeh Hsien-hsiu (Chinese: 葉憲修; pinyin: Yè Xiànxiū; born 1 June 1948), stage name Yeh Chi-Tien, is a Taiwanese politician and singer.

== Music career ==
As a singer, he was known by the stage name Yeh Chi-tien (葉啟田; Ia̍p Khé-tiân). He won the 1996 Golden Melody Award for Best Song of the Year.

== Political career ==
He was elected to the Legislative Yuan as a representative of Taipei County twice, between 1993 and 1996, then again from 1999 to 2002. He was caucus convenor for a small party, the Democratic Non-Partisan Alliance.
