= 15th Golden Melody Awards =

Taiwanese music award ceremony in 2004

- Location: Sun Yat-sen Memorial Hall (Taipei), Taiwan
- Hosted by: Tao Ching-Ying

Television/radio coverage
- Network: Azio TV

The 15th Golden Melody Awards were held on 8 May 2004 outside the Sun Yat-sen Memorial Hall in Taipei, Taiwan. Overseas guests included Korean artists, BoA, Kangta and TVXQ of SM Entertainment, The Voice Of Asia, Siti Nurhaliza Tata Young and Tsubasa Imai.

== Summary ==
Jay Chou's fourth album Yeh Hui-mei, named after his mother, was awarded Best Mandarin Album.
