= Abao (musician) =

Taiwanese singer

- Born: Aljenljeng Tjaluvie; 25 August 1981 (age 44); Jinfeng, Taitung, Taiwan
- Occupations: Singer, songwriter, actor
- Years active: 2003–present
- Spouse: Tsai Chao-chen (m. 2017)

Chinese name
- Traditional Chinese: 阿爆
- Hanyu Pinyin: Ābào
- Musical career
- Also known as: Aljenljeng Tjaluvie
- Genres: Mandopop, Pop, Rock, R&B
- Instruments: Voice, guitar and piano

Aljenljeng Tjaluvie (Paiwan pronunciation: [aˈʎənʎəŋ caluˈviə]; born 25 August 1981), known professionally as Abao (Chinese: 阿爆), is an Indigenous Taiwanese singer and songwriter. Born in Taitung County, she is of the Paiwan people and performs in their language. Additionally, she is fluent in Taiwanese Hokkien and Mandarin. In 2003, she debuted with the group Abao & Brandy and won the Golden Melody Award for Best Vocal Ensemble. As a solo artist, she released an album entirely in the Paiwan language, Vavayan ("Woman") in 2016, and won the Golden Melody Award for Best Aboriginal Language Album the following year. On October 3, 2020, Abao won the Golden Melody Award for Best Aboriginal Language Album and the Album of the Year for Kinakaian ("Mother Tongue"), as well as the Song of the Year Award with "Thank You".

Abao has stated that her music is meant to increase the pride of Taiwanese indigenous peoples in their cultures and languages, citing her own lack of fluency in Paiwan as a motivating factor. She collaborates with her mother to write the lyrics and correct her pronunciation. Additionally, she has established the label Nanguaq (meaning "good" in Paiwan) to distribute music from indigenous artists. Abao wrote an autobiography (Ari帶著問號往前走; "ari" meaning "let's go" in Paiwan) that was released in 2022.
