= 5th Golden Melody Awards =

Taiwanese music award ceremony in 1993

- Date: 20 November 1993
- Location: Sun Yat-sen Memorial Hall, Taipei, Taiwan
- Hosted by: Johnny Chao; Regina Tsang

Television/radio coverage
- Network: TTV

The 5th Golden Melody Awards ceremony (Chinese: 第五屆金曲獎) was held at the Sun Yat-sen Memorial Hall in Taipei on November 20, 1993.
