= 6th Golden Melody Awards =

Taiwanese music award ceremony in 1994

- Date: 26 November 1994
- Location: Sun Yat-sen Memorial Hall, Taipei, Taiwan
- Hosted by: Ba Ge; Pauline Lan

Television/radio coverage
- Network: CTV

The 6th Golden Melody Awards ceremony (Chinese: 第六屆金曲獎) was held at the Sun Yat-sen Memorial Hall in Taipei on November 26, 1994.
