= 13th Golden Melody Awards =

Taiwanese music award ceremony in 2002

- Location: Kaohsiung, Taiwan
- Hosted by: Chang Hsiao Yen; Tao Ching-Ying; Pu Hsueh-liang

Television/radio coverage
- Network: Azio TV

The 13th Golden Melody Awards ceremony was held at the Chiang Kai-shek Cultural Center in Kaohsiung, Taiwan, on 4 May 2002.
