= 7th Golden Melody Awards =

Taiwanese music award ceremony in 1996

- Date: 8 June 1996
- Location: Sun Yat-sen Memorial Hall, Taipei, Taiwan
- Hosted by: Tsai Chin; Kenny Bee

Television/radio coverage
- Network: CTS

The 7th Golden Melody Awards ceremony (Chinese: 第七屆金曲獎) was held at the Sun Yat-sen Memorial Hall in Taipei on June 8, 1996.
