= Ukulele (Taiwanese band) =

Taiwanese musical group

- Origin: Taiwan
- Genres: Mandopop
- Years active: 1991–1996; 2006
- Label: Dieng Jung Record
- Past members: Lee Chi; Terry Lin

Chinese name
- Traditional Chinese: 優客李林
- Simplified Chinese: 优客李林
Transcriptions
Standard Mandarin
- Hanyu Pinyin: Yōukè Lǐlín

Ukulele (traditional Chinese: 優客李林; simplified Chinese: 优客李林; pinyin: Yōukè Lǐlín) was a Taiwanese pop duet that formed in 1991 and disbanded in 1996. The band was composed of Lee Chi and Terry Lin. They made their debut with the album Confession (認錯) in 1991, and they have published 6 studio albums, 1 compilation album until disbanded in 1996, then they have published 2 compilation albums. In 2006, they performed their first and only concert in Taipei, Taiwan.

== Discography ==
=== Studio albums ===
Album #	Title	Language	Released date	Label
1st	Confession (認錯)	Mandarin	October 8, 1991	Dieng Jung Record
2nd	Yellow Ribbon (黃絲帶)	Mandarin	July 9, 1992	Dieng Jung Record
3rd	Junior Tour (少年遊)	Mandarin	April 1, 1993	Dieng Jung Record
4th	Ocean Deep	English	October 28, 1993	Dieng Jung Record
5th	Defend Love (捍衛愛情)	Mandarin	July 1, 1994	Dieng Jung Record
6th	Perhaps Love	English	March 1, 1995	Dieng Jung Record

=== Compilation albums ===
Album #	Title	Released date	Label
1st	Yesterday, Today, Forever (昨日·今日·永遠)	August 18, 1995	Dieng Jung Record
2nd	Unfinished Ukulele (未完成的優客李林)	April 1, 1997	Dieng Jung Record
3rd	Ukulele's Best Years (優客年代)	October 28, 2002	EMI Taiwan

== Awards and nominations ==
Year	Award	Category	Nomination	Result	Ref
1993	Singapore Golden Melody Awards	Most Popular Group/band	Ukulele	Won	
