= Chang Ho-chirl =

South Korean singer (born 1962)

- Born: January 12, 1962 (age 64); Seoul, South Korea
- Education: Chinese Culture University; National Taiwan University
- Occupations: singer; actor
- Labels: PolyGram (1988–1992); PonyCanyon (1993–1996); Linfair Records (2005–2007)
- Spouse: Ko Liang-liang (m. 1989; died 2005)
- Children: Chang En-en, daughter (b. 1992)

- Chang Ho-chirl
- Hangul: 장호철
- Hanja: 張鎬哲
- RR: Jang Hocheol
- MR: Chang Hoch'ŏl

Chang Ho-chirl (born January 12, 1962) is a South Korean singer who started his career in Taiwan.

Chang went to Taiwan in 1982 to study literature at Chinese Culture University. After graduation, he studied at National Taiwan University for a master's degree in political science. That's when he started his singing career, with his first album in 1988. He had since released 11 Mandopop albums in Taiwan, and 4 albums in South Korea (1 in Mandarin, 2 in Korean and 1 in English).
