= Chao Chuan =

Taiwanese singer

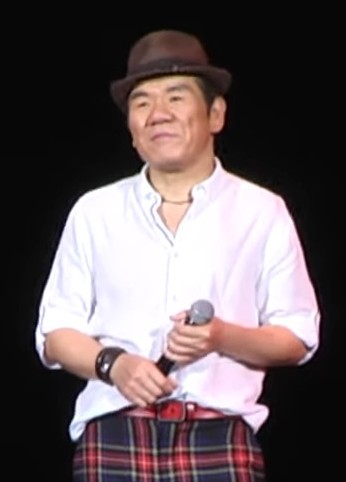
- Chao in 2019
- Born: 18 June 1961 (age 64); Chiayi, Taiwan
- Occupation: Singer
- Years active: 1988–present
- Musical career
- Also known as: Chief Chao
- Origin: Taiwan
- Genres: Mandopop; Hokkien pop; Rock
- Instruments: Vocals, guitar
- Labels: Rock Records; Warner Music; Warner Chappell

Chinese name
- Traditional Chinese: 趙傳
- Simplified Chinese: 赵传
Transcriptions
Standard Mandarin
- Hanyu Pinyin: Zhào Chuán
Yue: Cantonese
- Jyutping: ziu6 cyun4
Southern Min
- Hokkien POJ: Tiō Thoân

Chao Chuan (Chinese: 趙傳; pinyin: Zhào Chuán; Jyutping: ziu6 cyun4; Pe̍h-ōe-jī: Tiō Thoân; born 18 June 1961), known sometimes as "Chief" Chao, is a Taiwanese pop singer.

His breakthrough came with the song "I'm Ugly, but I'm Tender" (我很醜，可是我很溫柔) which was a giant hit in mainland China in 1988. His next major hit was "I'm Just a Little Bird" (我是一隻小小鳥, 1990).

== Albums ==
- I'm Not Good Looking But I'm Very Gentle (我很醜，可是我很溫柔; 1988)
- At Last, I Have Lost You (1989)
- I'm Just a Little Bird (1990)
- Chao Chuan Four (1991)
- You Are Always on my Mind (1991)
- Promise (1993)
- Finest Selection (精挑細選精選集; 1994)
- Love Me Then Give Me (愛我就給我; 1994)
- I Should Have Loved You From The Start (當初應該愛你; 1995）
- Hero in the Darkness 黑暗的英雄（1996）
- Star of Hope (希望之星; 1997)
- Deep Sea – EP (1997)
- A Little Braver (勇敢一點; 1999）insert card Courage, also known as Be Brave (Billboard)
- The Fool Who Ever Loved You (那個傻瓜愛過你; 2001)
- Martial Hero of Music (音樂武俠; 2012)
- How Have You Been (你過得還好嗎; 2017)
