= 17th Golden Melody Awards =

Taiwanese music award ceremony in 2006

- Location: Taipei Arena, Taiwan
- Hosted by: Matilda Tao and Dee Hsu

Television/radio coverage
- Network: Azio TV

The 17th Golden Melody Awards were held on 10 June 2006 at the Taipei Arena in Taipei, Taiwan.

== Summary ==
Although alternative musicians were nominated several times for awards, most of the categories were won by mainstream artists. The award ceremony featured South Korean pop singer Se7en as a guest artist. Chinese American rap artist Jin also performed with Taiwanese American singer Leehom Wang for their song titled Heroes of Earth.

The Taipei Times also dubbed the ceremony as having one of the "worst performances to date" due to poorly rehearsed performances by Singaporean artist Stefanie Sun and Hong Kong singer Eason Chan.

The 17th Golden Melody Awards were held on 10 June 2006 at the Taipei Arena in Taipei, Taiwan.
