= 4th Golden Melody Awards =

Taiwanese music award ceremony in 1992

- Date: 21 November 1992
- Location: Sun Yat-sen Memorial Hall, Taipei, Taiwan
- Hosted by: Timothy Chao; Tu Min

Television/radio coverage
- Network: CTS

The 4th Golden Melody Awards ceremony (Chinese: 第四屆金曲獎) was held at the Sun Yat-sen Memorial Hall in Taipei on November 21, 1992.
