= 8th Golden Melody Awards =

Taiwanese music award ceremony in 1997

- Date: 3 May 1997
- Location: Taipei International Convention Center, Taipei, Taiwan

Television/radio coverage
- Network: TTV

The 8th Golden Melody Awards ceremony (Chinese: 第八屆金曲獎) was held at the Taipei International Convention Center on May 3, 1997.
