= 12th Golden Melody Awards =

Taiwanese music award ceremony in 2001

- Location: Kaohsiung, Taiwan

Television/radio coverage
- Network: ETTV

The 12th Golden Melody Awards ceremony was held at the Chiang Kai-shek Cultural Center (高雄市立中正文化中心) in Kaohsiung, Taiwan, on 5 May 2001.
