= 2nd Golden Melody Awards =

1990 Taiwanese music awards ceremony

- Date: 27 October 1990
- Location: Sun Yat-sen Memorial Hall, Taipei, Taiwan
- Hosted by: Allen Chao; Yang Hai-wei

Television/radio coverage
- Network: TTV

The 2nd Golden Melody Awards ceremony (Chinese: 第二屆金曲獎) was held at the Sun Yat-sen Memorial Hall in Taipei, on 27 October 1990.

2nd Golden Melody Awards

The 2nd Golden Melody Awards were organized by the Government Information Office of the Executive Yuan in 1990. A total of 13 awards were presented, and the list of nominees along with the special award winner was announced on September 22, 1990. The awards ceremony took place on October 27, 1990, at the National Dr. Sun Yat-sen Memorial Hall in Taipei, with the ceremony produced and broadcast by Taiwan Television (TTV).

== Changes to the Awards ==
A total of 13 awards were presented, including the newly introduced categories for Best Album, Best Album Producer, and Best Recording. The Best Single Music Video Director Award was discontinued. As for the categories of Male Artist, Female Artist, Artist Group, and Newcomer, the requirement for nominees from the first Golden Melody Awards to perform live during the decision-making round was removed.

The application period for awards ran from July 5 to July 15, with 24 record companies submitting a total of 508 entries.

== Awards Ceremony ==
The ceremony was held on the evening of October 27 at 7:30 PM at the National Dr. Sun Yat-sen Memorial Hall in Taipei. The hosts were Zhao Shuhai and Yang Haiwei. Taiwan Television (TTV) broadcast the full ceremony live, beginning at 10:00 PM.

== Nominee and Winner Announcement ==
The list of nominees was revealed on September 22, 1990, along with the announcement of the special award recipient, which was awarded to Min-Nan (Southern Fujian) language song creator Chen Qiulin. The other winners were announced during the live awards ceremony on October 27, 1990.
