= Golden Melody Awards =

Annual Taiwanese music award ceremony

- Current: 37th Golden Melody Awards
- Awarded for: Outstanding achievements in the music industry
- Country: Taiwan
- Presented by: Ministry of Culture (Taiwan)
- First award: January 6, 1990; 36 years ago
- Website: gma.tavis.tw

The Golden Melody Awards (simplified Chinese: 金曲奖; traditional Chinese: 金曲獎; pinyin: Jīnqǔ Jiǎng), commonly abbreviated as GMA, is an honor awarded by Taiwan's Ministry of Culture to recognize outstanding achievement in the Mandarin, Taiwanese Hokkien, Hakka, and Formosan languages popular and traditional music industry. The GMAs are awarded on the basis of votes by members of a jury and have been recognized as the equivalent to the Grammy Awards in the Chinese-speaking world. It is the music industry counterpart to the Golden Bell Awards (television) and the Golden Horse Awards (motion pictures).

The 1st Golden Melody Awards was held on January 6, 1990. Following the 1996 ceremony, the Ministry of Culture overhauled many Golden Melody Award categories for 1997.

In 1997, the awards were split into separate honors for popular music and traditional music. The two awards became distinct ceremonies in 2007. Starting in 2014, the Golden Melody Awards for traditional music has been awarded by the National Center for Traditional Arts, another division of the Ministry of Culture.

The 31st and 32nd editions of the awards ceremony were postponed to October 2020 and August 2021, respectively, due to the COVID-19 pandemic. The 33rd edition was held on July 2, 2022 at the Kaohsiung Arena in Kaohsiung, marking its first return to Kaohsiung City since the 16th edition.

== Ceremonies ==
Edition	Date	Category	Venue	Location
1st	6 January 1990	—N/a	Sun Yat-sen Memorial Hall	Taipei, Taiwan
2nd	27 October 1990	—N/a	Sun Yat-sen Memorial Hall	Taipei, Taiwan
3rd	9 November 1991	—N/a	Sun Yat-sen Memorial Hall	Taipei, Taiwan
4th	21 November 1992	—N/a	Sun Yat-sen Memorial Hall	Taipei, Taiwan
5th	20 November 1993	—N/a	Sun Yat-sen Memorial Hall	Taipei, Taiwan
6th	26 November 1994	—N/a	Sun Yat-sen Memorial Hall	Taipei, Taiwan
7th	8 June 1996	—N/a	Sun Yat-sen Memorial Hall	Taipei, Taiwan
8th	3 May 1997	—N/a	Taipei International Convention Center	Taipei, Taiwan
9th	29 May 1998	—N/a	Sun Yat-sen Memorial Hall	Taipei, Taiwan
10th	30 April 1999	—N/a	Sun Yat-sen Memorial Hall	Taipei, Taiwan
11th	28 April 2000	—N/a	Sun Yat-sen Memorial Hall	Taipei, Taiwan
12th	5 May 2001	—N/a	Kaohsiung Chiang Kai-shek Cultural Center	Kaohsiung, Taiwan
13th	4 May 2002	—N/a	Kaohsiung Chiang Kai-shek Cultural Center	Kaohsiung, Taiwan
14th	3 August 2003	—N/a	National Taiwan University Sports Center	Taipei, Taiwan
15th	8 May 2004	—N/a	Sun Yat-sen Memorial Hall	Taipei, Taiwan
16th	28 May 2005	—N/a	Kaohsiung Chiang Kai-shek Cultural Center	Kaohsiung, Taiwan
17th	10 June 2006	—N/a	Taipei Arena	Taipei, Taiwan
18th	2 June 2007	Traditional	ISCC Convention Center	Taipei, Taiwan
18th	16 June 2007	Popular	Taipei Arena	Taipei, Taiwan
19th	21 June 2008	Traditional	Taipei County Government Multifunction Hall	Banqiao, Taiwan
19th	5 July 2008	Popular	Taipei Arena	Taipei, Taiwan
20th	6 June 2009	Traditional	Sun Yat-sen Memorial Hall	Taipei, Taiwan
20th	27 June 2009	Popular	Taipei Arena	Taipei, Taiwan
21st	5 June 2010	Traditional	Sun Yat-sen Memorial Hall	Taipei, Taiwan
21st	26 June 2010	Popular	Taipei Arena	Taipei, Taiwan
22nd	28 May 2011	Traditional	National Taiwan University Sports Center	Taipei, Taiwan
22nd	18 June 2011	Popular	Taipei Arena	Taipei, Taiwan
23rd	2 June 2012	Traditional	Sun Yat-sen Memorial Hall	Taipei, Taiwan
23rd	23 June 2012	Popular	Taipei Arena	Taipei, Taiwan
24th	8 June 2013	Traditional	Sun Yat-sen Memorial Hall	Taipei, Taiwan
24th	6 July 2013	Popular	Taipei Arena	Taipei, Taiwan
25th	28 June 2014	Popular	Taipei Arena	Taipei, Taiwan
25th	9 August 2014	Traditional	Zhongshan Hall	Taipei, Taiwan
26th	27 June 2015	Popular	Taipei Arena	Taipei, Taiwan
26th	1 August 2015	Traditional	Zhongshan Hall	Taipei, Taiwan
27th	25 June 2016	Popular	Taipei Arena	Taipei, Taiwan
27th	13 August 2016	Traditional	National Center for Traditional Arts	Wujie, Taiwan
28th	24 June 2017	Popular	Taipei Arena	Taipei, Taiwan
28th	26 August 2017	Traditional	NTUA Performing Arts Center	New Taipei City, Taiwan
29th	23 June 2018	Popular	Taipei Arena	Taipei, Taiwan
29th	11 August 2018	Traditional	Taiwan Traditional Theatre Center	Taipei, Taiwan
30th	29 June 2019	Popular	Taipei Arena	Taipei, Taiwan
30th	10 August 2019	Traditional	Taiwan Traditional Theatre Center	Taipei, Taiwan
31st	3 October 2020	Popular	Taipei Music Center	Taipei, Taiwan
31st	24 October 2020	Traditional	Taiwan Traditional Theatre Center	Taipei, Taiwan
32nd	21 August 2021	Popular	Taipei Music Center	Taipei, Taiwan
32nd	9 October 2021	Traditional	Taiwan Traditional Theatre Center	Taipei, Taiwan
33rd	2 July 2022	Popular	Kaohsiung Arena	Kaohsiung, Taiwan
33rd	29 October 2022	Traditional	Taiwan Traditional Theatre Center	Taipei, Taiwan
34th	1 July 2023	Popular	Taipei Arena	Taipei, Taiwan
34th	7 October 2023	Traditional	Taiwan Traditional Theatre Center	Taipei, Taiwan
35th	29 June 2024	Popular	Taipei Arena	Taipei, Taiwan
35th	31 August 2024	Traditional	Taiwan Traditional Theatre Center	Taipei, Taiwan
36th	28 June 2025	Popular	Taipei Arena	Taipei, Taiwan
36th	23 August 2025	Traditional	Taiwan Traditional Theatre Center	Taipei, Taiwan
37th	27 June 2026	Popular	Taipei Arena	Taipei, Taiwan
37th	22 August 2026	Traditional	Taiwan Traditional Theatre Center	Taipei, Taiwan

== Categories ==
=== Popular music ===
==== Vocal category – Record label awards ====
- Album of the Year (年度專輯獎)
- Song of the Year (年度歌曲獎)
- Best Mandarin Album (最佳華語專輯獎)
- Best Taiwanese Album (最佳台語專輯獎)
- Best Hakka Album (最佳客語專輯獎)
- Best Indigenous Language Album (最佳原住民語專輯獎)

==== Vocal category – Individual awards ====
- Best Composer (最佳作曲人獎)
- Best Lyricist (最佳作詞人獎)
- Best Arranger (最佳編曲人獎)
- Best Album Producer (最佳專輯製作人獎)
- Best Song Producer (最佳單曲製作人獎)
- Best Mandarin Male Singer (最佳華語男歌手獎)
- Best Mandarin Female Singer (最佳華語女歌手獎)
- Best Taiwanese Male Singer (最佳台語男歌手獎)
- Best Taiwanese Female Singer (最佳台語女歌手獎)
- Best Hakka Singer (最佳客語歌手獎)
- Best Indigenous Language Singer (最佳原住民語歌手獎)
- Best Band (最佳樂團獎)
- Best Vocal Group (最佳演唱組合獎)
- Best New Artist (最佳新人獎)

==== Instrumental category – Record label awards ====
- Best Instrumental Album (演奏類最佳專輯獎)

==== Instrumental category – Individual awards ====
- Best Instrumental Album Producer (演奏類最佳專輯製作人獎)
- Best Instrumental Composer (演奏類最佳作曲人獎)

==== Technical category – Individual awards ====
- Best Album Design (最佳裝幀設計獎)

==== Technical category – Record label awards ====
- Best Vocal Recording Album (最佳演唱錄音專輯獎)
- Best Instrumental Recording Album (最佳演奏錄音專輯獎)
- Best Music Video (最佳MV獎)

==== Special category ====
- Special Contribution Award (特別貢獻獎)
- Jury Award (評審團獎)

=== Traditional arts and music ===
==== Publishing category – Album awards ====
- Best Traditional Album (最佳傳統音樂專輯獎)
- Best Art Music Album (最佳藝術音樂專輯獎)
- Best Fusion Album (最佳跨界音樂專輯獎)
- Best Audiovisual Album (最佳傳統表演藝術影音出版獎)
- Best Religious Music Album (最佳宗教音樂專輯獎)

==== Publishing category – Individual awards ====
- Best Creation (最佳創作獎)
- Best Album Producer (最佳專輯製作人獎)
- Best Interpretation (最佳詮釋獎)
- Best Recording (最佳錄音獎)

==== Performance category ====
- Best Performance of the Year (最佳團體年度演出獎)
- Best New Artist (最佳個人表演新秀獎)
- Best Actor (Actress) of the Year (年度最佳演員獎)

==== Special category ====
- Lifetime Contribution Award (特別獎)
