= Sun Yat-sen Memorial Hall (Taipei) =

Memorial hall in Xinyi, Taipei, Taiwan

Coordinates: 25°2′24″N 121°33′36″E

National Sun Yat-sen Memorial Hall
- 國立國父紀念館
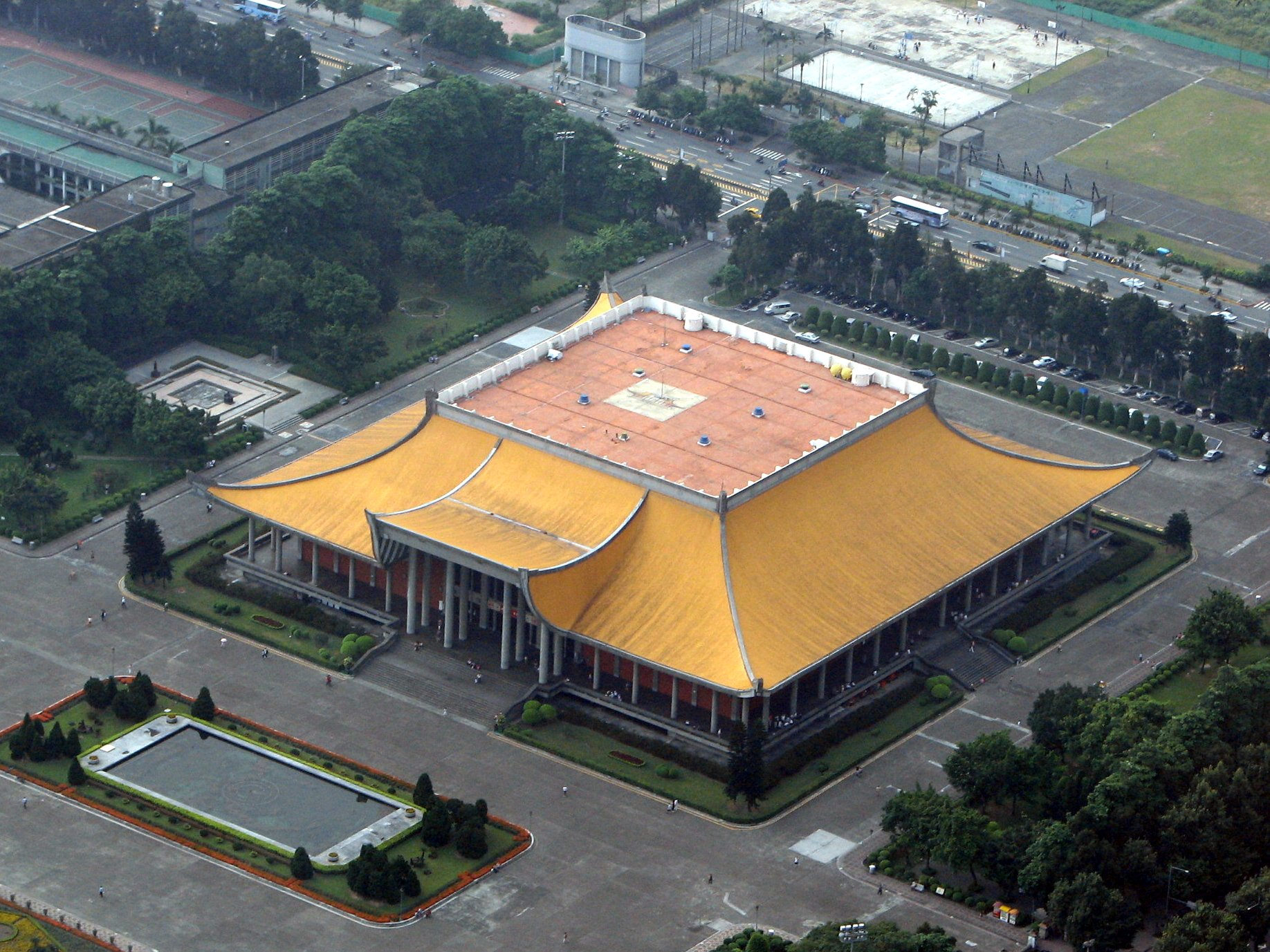
- Interactive map of National Sun Yat-sen Memorial Hall
- Location: Xinyi, Taipei, Taiwan
- Designer: Wang Da-hong
- Type: Memorial
- Material: Concrete
- Height: 29.6 m (97 ft)
- Completion date: 16 May 1972
- Dedicated to: Sun Yat-sen

Sun Yat-sen Memorial Hall
- Traditional Chinese: 國立國父紀念館
- Simplified Chinese: 国立国父纪念馆
- Literal meaning: National 'Father of the Nation' Memorial Hall
Transcriptions
Standard Mandarin
- Hanyu Pinyin: Guólì Guófù Jìniàn Guǎn
- Wade–Giles: Kuo-li Kuo-fu Chi-nien Kuan

The National Sun Yat-sen Memorial Hall (Chinese: 國立國父紀念館) is located in Xinyi District, Taipei, Taiwan. It is a memorial to the Republic of China's National Father, Dr. Sun Yat-sen, and was completed in 1972. The total building area covers 29,464 square metres (7.3 acres) in an open space of 115,000 square metres (28.4 acres). It contains displays of Sun's life and the revolution he led, and is also a multi-purpose social, educational and cultural center for the public. It has sometimes been likened as a Taiwanese analogue to the Lincoln Memorial in the United States.

The hall has been closed for renovations since February 26, 2024, with an expected reopening in late 2026.

== Description ==
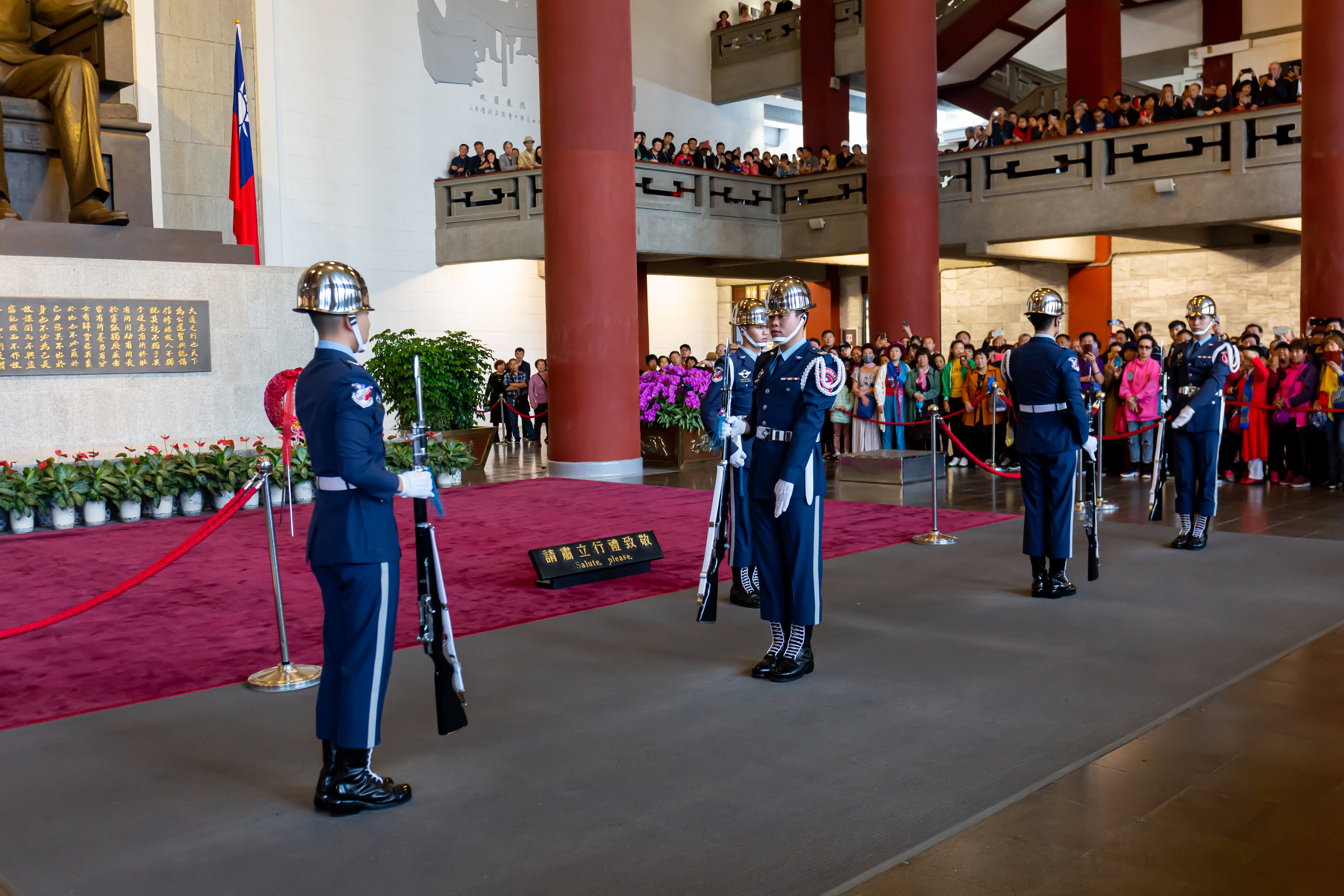
The changing of the guard ceremony

The main entrance to the hall contains a statue of Sun Yat-sen. Every hour, there is a formal changing of the guards, which is a popular tourist attraction. The building also includes a performance hall, an exhibition center of about 10,000 square feet (1,000 m^{2}), a multimedia theatre, an audio-visual center, lecture halls, and a library with over 300,000 books.

The building itself is sited in Chung-shan Park. It includes gardens, decorative historical walls, and an exhibition and performance area surrounding Lake Cui (Chinese: 翠湖; pinyin: Cuì Hú), also known as Emerald Pond.

== History ==
Taiwan's government began to prepare the construction of the National Dr. Sun Yat-sen Memorial Hall in 1964. In 1965, President Chiang Kai-shek officiated the groundbreaking ceremony. The design plan by architect Wang Da-hong was selected in a public contest one year later, and modified under the instruction of Chiang, to emphasize Chinese architectural characteristics. The main construction was completed on 16 May 1972. Chiang's funeral was held in the main hall of the Sun Yat-sen Memorial Hall in 1975. Originally, the Memorial Hall primarily functioned as a place to display the historical relics of Sun's life and the Xinhai Revolution. It was later opened to exhibitions and performances. Taiwan's highest movie award ceremony, the Golden Horse Film Festival and Awards, is held annually in the Memorial Hall Auditorium.

Initially affiliated with the city government of Taipei, the Memorial Hall became part of the Ministry of Education, together with the Chung-Shan Building in Yangmingshan, in 1986.

== Transportation ==
Sun Yat-sen Memorial Hall is accessible within walking distance East from Sun Yat-sen Memorial Hall Station of the Taipei Metro (Blue) Bannan Line towards Taipei Nangang Exhibition Centre.

== See also ==
- National Chiang Kai-shek Memorial Hall
- Sun Yat-sen Mausoleum
- Sun Yat Sen Memorial House
- Sun Yat Sen Nanyang Memorial Hall
- Chung-Shan Building
- Sun Yat Sen Memorial Park
