= Golden Melody Award for Best Mandarin Male Singer =

Taiwanese music award

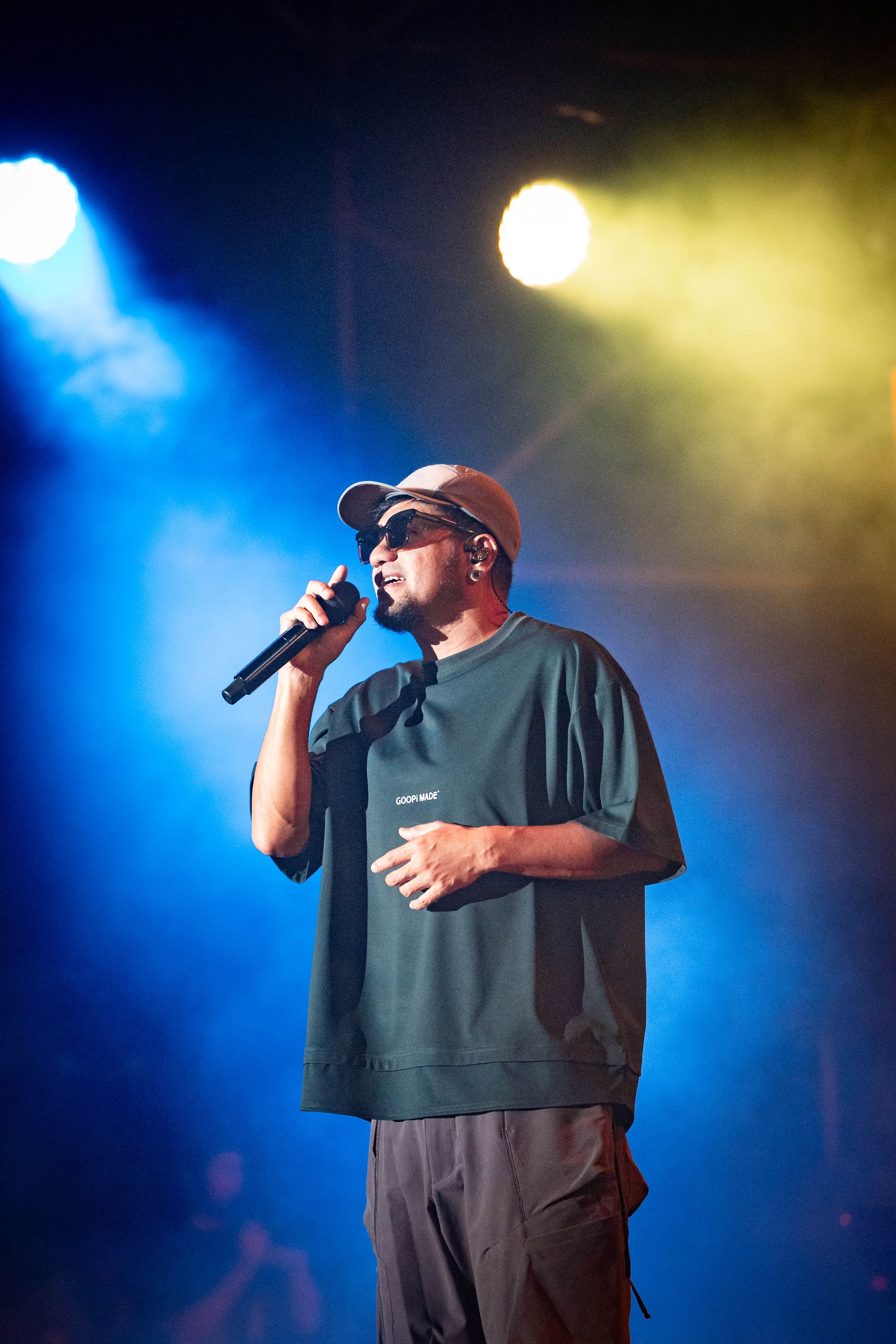
- The 2026 recipient: Chang Chen-yue
- Awarded for: Quality male vocal performances in the Mandopop music genre
- Country: Taiwan
- Presented by: Ministry of Culture
- First award: 1991
- Currently held by: Chang Chen-yue for Go With The Flow (2026)
- Website: gma.tavis.tw

The Golden Melody Award for Best Mandarin Male Singer (Chinese: 金曲獎最佳華語男歌手獎) is an annual award presented by the Ministry of Culture of Taiwan. It was first presented in 1990 as Best Male Singer.

Hong Kong singer Eason Chan and Taiwanese singer Johnny Yin share the record for the most wins in this category, with three each. American singer Wang Leehom holds the record for the most nominations, with nine.

== Winners and nominees ==
=== Best Male Singer (1990–1991) ===
Year	Recipient	Nominees	Ref
January 1990	Johnny Yin	Dave Wang; Wakin Chau; Chiang Yu-heng; Fei Yu-ching	
October 1990	Chris Hung - Feng Feng Yu Yu Zhe Duo Nian (風風雨雨這多年)	Chang Yu-sheng - Miss Me (想念我); Jeff Chang - Forget Me Not (忘記); Teng A-tien - I Came from Afar (我自遠方來); Angus Tung - The Place Where Dreams Begin (夢開始的地方)	

=== Best Mandarin Male Singer (1991–1996) ===
Year	Recipient	Nominees	Ref
1991	Chao Chuan	Jonathan Lee; Wakin Chau; Jacky Wu; Angus Tung	
1992	Wakin Chau	Dave Wang; Sky Wu; Fei Yu-ching; Huang Pin-yuan	
1993	Johnny Yin	Wang Ching-kuo (Wang Hsiang); Jonathan Lee; Wakin Chau; Chang Yu-sheng	
1994	Johnny Yin - Chen Yuan (塵緣)	Sky Wu - Zui Ai Shi Ni (最愛是你); Jacky Cheung - Blessing (祝福); Angus Tung - Now and Later (現在以後); Fei Yu-ching - We Are Always Friends (一生的朋友)	
1996	Jeff Chang - Generosity (寬容)	Fei Yu-ching - Good Night Song (晚安曲); Sky Wu - Love and Sorrow (愛與愁); Terry Lin - Heartache (心痛的感覺); Chao Chuan - I Should Have Loved You (當初應該愛你)	

=== Popular Music: Best Mandarin Male Singer (1997–2006) ===
Year	Recipient	Nominees	Ref
1997	Chyi Chin - Silk Road (絲路)	Sky Wu - Who You Love (你愛誰); Angus Tung - Shelter (收留); Jeff Chang - Dream (夢想); Jacky Cheung - How Could I Forget You? (忘記你我做不到)	
1998	Jacky Cheung - Xiang He Ni Qu Chui Chui Feng (想和你去吹吹風)	David Tao - David Tao; Wu Bai - Rock Romance (搖滾浪漫); Chyi Chin - Wolf (狼 黃金自選輯); Harlem Yu - Just for You (只有為你)	
1999	Wang Leehom - Revolution (公轉自轉)	Terry Lin - Mona Lisa's Tear (蒙娜麗莎的眼淚); Harlem Yu - Harlem No.1 (第一張精選輯); Andy Hui - ABCD (甲乙丙丁); Chyi Chin - Wo Na She Ma Ai Ni (我拿什麼愛你)	
2000	Purdur - Ho-Hai-Yan Ocean (海洋)	David Tao - I'm OK; Harlem Yu - Most Familiar (我最熟悉); Wang Leehom - Impossible to Miss You; Jacky Cheung - Walk By 1999 (走過1999)	
2001	Aadia - I Am Human (我是人)	William So - So's Time (蘇情時間); Yuan Wei Jen - Yuan Wei Jen; Wang Leehom - Forever's First Day (永遠的第一天); Harlem Yu - Hollywood (哈萊塢)	
2002	Harlem Yu - Tidal Wave (海嘯)	William So - Bei Shang Zhi Bu (悲傷止步); Jay Chou - Fantasy; Eason Chan - It's Me (反正是我); Sky Wu - Wanting (想念); Wang Leehom - The One and Only (唯一)	
2003	Eason Chan - Special Thanks To…	David Tao - Black Tangerine; Hsiao Huang-chi - You Are My Eyes (你是我的眼); Terry Lin - The Taste of Time (時間的味道); Fei Yu-ching - Grace & Talent Recurrence (風華再現 情繫百樂門); Jacky Cheung - Where Is He (他在那裡)	
2004	Sky Wu - Pianist of Love (愛的鋼琴手)	David Tao - Ultrasound 1997–2003; Eason Chan - Black. White. Gray (黑白灰); Wang Leehom - Unbelievable; Jay Chou - Yeh Hui-mei	
2005	Stanley Huang - Shades of my Mind	Terry Lin - Most Emotion (至情志炫); Jay Chou - Common Jasmin Orange; Biung Tak-Banuaz - Zou Feng De Ren (走風的人); Wang Leehom - Shangri-La	
2006	Wang Leehom - Heroes of Earth	Kenji Wu - The Kenji Show (大頑家); Jacky Cheung - Snow.Wolf.Lake; Terry Lin - Familiar Songs (熟情歌); Ara Kimbo - In A Flash (匆匆); David Tao - The Great Leap	

=== Popular Music: Vocal Category - Best Mandarin Male Singer (2007–2016) ===
Year	Recipient	Nominees	Ref
2007	Nicky Lee - Baby It's Me (Baby是我)	JJ Lin - Cao Cao; Gary Chaw - Superman; David Tao - Beautiful; Kenji Wu - A General Order (將軍令)	
2008	Gary Chaw - Super Sunshine	Eason Chan - Admit It (認了吧); Tank - Keep Fighting; Shin - I'm Just Me (我就是我); Roger Yang - Roger Yang II (楊培安II); Khalil Fong - Wonderland (未來)	
2009	Jay Chou - Capricorn	Eason Chan - Don't Want To Let Go (不想放手); Hsiao Huang-chi - I'm Ricky Hsiao (我是蕭煌奇); Wang Leehom - Heart Beat; Khalil Fong - Orange Moon (橙月)	
2010	David Tao - Opus 69	JJ Lin - 100 Days; Eason Chan - 5/F Blissful (上五樓的快活); Khalil Fong - Timeless; Jam Hsiao - Princess	
2011	Jay Chou - The Era	William Wei - William Wei; JJ Lin - She Says; Wang Leehom - The 18 Martial Arts; Chyi Chin - Wonderful Life (美麗境界)	
2012	Luantan Ascent - Ba Wo Huan Cheng Ni (把我換成你)	Yoga Lin - Perfect Life; Eason Chan - ？; Jay Chou - Exclamation Mark; Jam Hsiao - Jam Wild Dreams (狂想曲)	
2013	Jam Hsiao - It's All About Love (以愛之名)	Yoga Lin - Fiction; Jay Chou - Opus 12; Xiao Yu - One More Time (再一次); Khalil Fong - Back to Wonderland (回到未來)	
2014	JJ Lin - Stories Untold	Li Ronghao - Model (模特); Chang Chen-yue - I am Ayal Komod (我是海雅谷慕); Soft Lipa - Recreate (你所不知道的杜振熙之內部整修); Wakin Chau - Jianghu (江湖)	
2015	Eason Chan - Rice & Shine (米。閃)	Khalil Fong - Dangerous World; William Wei - Journey Into The Night; Roger Yang - Beast In the Dark (沈睡的野獸); Jacky Cheung - Wake Up Dreaming	
2016	JJ Lin - From M.E. to Myself	Namewee - Asian Killer 2015 (亞洲通殺2015); Li Jian - Li Jian (李健第六張創作專輯); Kowen - Ni Bu Zhen De Xiang Liu Lang (你不真的想流浪); Matzka - Vu Vu Reggae (東南美)	

=== Popular Music: Vocal - Individual Awards - Best Male Vocalist Mandarin (2017–present) ===
Year	Recipient	Nominees	Ref
2017	Khalil Fong - Journey to the West (JTW 西遊記)	Jay Chou - Jay Chou's Bedtime Stories; Guo Ding - The Silent Star Stone (飛行器的執行週期); Crowd Lu - What a Folk!!!!!!; Yoga Lin - Sell Like Hot Cakes (今日營業中); Namewee - Cross over Asia (亞洲通車); Dwagie - Hard Knock (硬)	
2018	Eason Chan - C'mon In~	Xiao Yu - With You (同在); Nicky Lee - Will You Remember; JJ Lin - Message in a Bottle (偉大的渺小); Haor - How	
2019	Leo Wang - Wu Bing Singing, Yo Chin Soothing	Eli Hsieh - Where Are We Going?; Kowen Ko - Song of the Bards; Li Ronghao - Ear; ØZI - ØZI: The Album	
2020	Wu Qing-feng - Spaceman	Wakin Chau - The Younger Me; J.Sheon - The Alley; Ayal Komod - Gone Away; Namewee - Calling Asia; Jude Chiu - Flee From The Ceremony	
2021	Soft Lipa - Home Cookin	E.SO - Outta Body; JJ Lin - Drifter · Like You Do; Wu Qing-feng - Folio Vol. 1 One and One; WeiBird - Sounds of My Life; James Li - Shi Ri Tan	
2022	Cui Jian - A Flying Dog	Crowd Lu - healism; Xu Jun - Dreams Company; YELLOW - BEANSTALK; Ma Nien-hsien - Mama Jeans And Daddy Shoes; Jude Chiu - The Last Aquarium; James Li - Shi Ri Tan	
2023	HUSH - Pleasing Myself	Mr. Yao's 8th Grade Syndrome – MC Hot Dog; PRO – Kumachan; Melarme's Tuesdays – Qing Feng Wu; Talent – The Crane; Teen on Shuqian Street – Zhao Lei	
2024	MC Hotdog – Disgusted Performed By	OPEN IT – Xu Jun; Painfully, Happily After – JJ Lin; Not So Far Away – Marz23; Jude Chiu – Jude Chiu	
2025	Trout Fresh – Good Sound With Attitude	No Worries – Ricky Hsiao; Camouflage – Terence Lam; Fragments of Becoming – PoLin Tung; Black Horse – Li Ronghao	
2026	Ayal Komod – Go With The Flow	HeartBreakFast – Crowd Lu; BETTER – Gummy B; Back to the Flesh – Jude Chiu; LOVE RAGE HOPE – Nick Chou	

== Statistics ==
=== Most wins ===
Number of awards	Artist	Number of nominations
3	Eason Chan	9
3	Johnny Yin	3
2	Wang Leehom	9
2	Jay Chou	8
2	JJ Lin	7

=== Most nominations ===
Number of nominations	Artist	Number of awards
9	Eason Chan	3
9	Wang Leehom	2
8	Jay Chou	2
7	David Tao	1
7	Jacky Cheung	1
7	JJ Lin	2
6	Sky Wu	1
6	Khalil Fong	1
5	Harlem Yu	1
5	Wakin Chau	1
5	Fei Yu-ching	0
5	Terry Lin	0
4	Chyi Chin	1
4	Angus Tung	0
4	Jude Chiu	0
3	Johnny Yin	3
3	Jeff Chang	1
3	Jam Hsiao	1
3	Ayal Komod	1
3	Yoga Lin	0
3	Li Ronghao	0
