= Jude Chiu =

Chinese singer-songwriter (born 1994)

- Born: Zhao Xinan (赵熙南); August 9, 1994 (age 32); Guiyang, Guizhou, China
- Education: Guizhou Normal University
- Occupations: Singer; songwriter; music producer
- Years active: 2018–present
- Musical career
- Also known as: Qiu De
- Origin: China
- Genres: Mandopop
- Label: NetEase Cloud Music (2018–present)

Jude Chiu (Chinese: 裘德; pinyin: Qiú Dé; born August 9, 1994) is a Chinese singer-songwriter. He holds the record for the most nominations for the Golden Melody Award for Best Mandarin Male Singer among singers from mainland China, with four.

== Early life ==
Chiu was born on August 9, 1994 as Zhao Xinan (Chinese: 赵熙南; pinyin: Zhào Xīnán) in Guizhou, Guiyang. He studied bel canto at Guizhou Normal University. He won second place in a local college student singing competition in 2016.

== Career ==
After graduating, Chiu moved to Beijing to pursue a music career. In 2018, he was selected for NetEase Cloud Music's initiative supporting independent singer-songwriters and went on to release his debut solo EP, Science Fiction Boy (科幻男孩). In 2019, he released his first studio album, Flee From the Ceremony (颁奖的时候我要缺席), which earned him a nomination for Best Mandarin Male Singer at the 31st Golden Melody Awards. In 2021, he released his second studio album, The Last Aquarium (最后的水族馆), which features a collaboration with Waa Wei. For the album, he was once again nominated for Best Mandarin Male Singer at the 33rd Golden Melody Awards. In 2023, he was featured in the music reality show Infinity and Beyond (声生不息·宝岛季). Later that year, he released his third studio album, the self-titled Jude Chiu (裘德), featuring collaborations with Lala Hsu, Leah Dou and HUSH. In 2024, the album received six nominations at the 35th Golden Melody Awards, including Album of the Year, Best Mandarin Album, Best Vocal Recording Album, Best Arranger and Best Mandarin Male Singer for Chiu. Chiu arrived in Taiwan, but did not attend the ceremony.

In 2025, Chiu released his fourth studio album, Back to the Flesh (离开银色荒原). The album explores sci-fi themes and features collaborations with Wu Qing-feng, Sun Sheng Xi and Hsia Yu. In 2026, Back to the Flesh received seven nominations at the 37th Golden Melody Awards. Ultimately, Chiu and his collaborator, Tsui Chin Hung, won Best Arranger for "The Silver Waste Land," marking the first Golden Melody Award of his career.

== Discography ==
=== Studio albums ===
- Flee From the Ceremony (2019)
- The Last Aquarium (2021)
- Jude Chiu (2023)
- Back to the Flesh (2025)

== Awards and nominations ==
Award	Year	Category	Work	Result	Ref.
Freshmusic Awards	2022	Best Male Vocalist	The Last Aquarium	Nominated	
Freshmusic Awards	2024	Best Male Vocalist	Jude Chiu	Nominated	
Freshmusic Awards	2024	Top 10 Singles of the Year	"Bruise Within"	Won	
Golden Melody Awards	2020	Best Mandarin Male Singer	Flee From the Ceremony	Nominated	
Golden Melody Awards	2022	Best Mandarin Male Singer	The Last Aquarium	Nominated	
Golden Melody Awards	2024	Album of the Year	Jude Chiu	Nominated	
Golden Melody Awards	2024	Best Mandarin Album	Jude Chiu	Nominated	
Golden Melody Awards	2024	Best Vocal Recording Album	Jude Chiu	Nominated	
Golden Melody Awards	2024	Best Mandarin Male Singer	Jude Chiu	Nominated	
Golden Melody Awards	2024	Best Arranger (shared with Walter Kwan and Tsui Chin Hung)	"Embryo"	Nominated	
Golden Melody Awards	2026	Album of the Year	Back to the Flesh	Nominated	
Golden Melody Awards	2026	Best Mandarin Album	Back to the Flesh	Nominated	
Golden Melody Awards	2026	Best Mandarin Male Singer	Back to the Flesh	Nominated	
Golden Melody Awards	2026	Best Album Producer (shared with Tonyi NG)	Back to the Flesh	Nominated	
Golden Melody Awards	2026	Best Composer	"The Silver Waste Land"	Nominated	
Golden Melody Awards	2026	Best Arranger (shared with Tsui Chin Hung)	"The Silver Waste Land"	Won	
