= Chen Ta-ju =

Taiwanese songwriter

- 陳達儒
- Born: 10 February 1917; Wanhua District, Taipei, Taiwan
- Died: 24 October 1992 (aged 75); Zhongshan District, Taipei, Mackay Memorial Hospital
- Other name: 陳發生
- Education: Governor's Office Police Superintendent's Drill Hall
- Occupations: Lyricist, entrepreneur
- Notable work: White Peony, Youthful Ridge, Bitter Heart, Anping Memories, Farewell by the Harbor, Southern Nocturne
- Awards: 1990 Golden Melody Awards, Special Contribution Award

- 陳達儒
- Hàn-jī: 陳達儒
- Pe̍h-ōe-jī: Tân Ta̍t-jû
- Tâi-lô: Tân Ta̍t-jû
- Bbánpìng: Dán Dátlú

Chen Ta-ju (Chinese: 陳達儒; pinyin: Chén Dárú; 10 February 1917 – 24 October 1992), also known by his style name Fa Sheng (Chinese: 發生; pinyin: Fáshēng), was a Taiwanese pop song lyricist born in Bangka, Taipei.

He wrote about 300 lyrics in his lifetime, and his masterpieces include White Peony, Youthful Ridge, "Bitter Heart" (心酸酸), Anping Memories "Youthful Sorrows and Joys" (青春悲喜曲), "Farewell by the Harbor" (港邊惜別), and Southern Nocturne. For his achievements, he was awarded the Special Prize of the 1st Golden Melody Awards in 1989.

== Biography ==
=== Early life ===
Chen Ta-ju was born near the Bangka Qingshui Temple in Bangka, Taipei during the Japanese rule in Taiwan. He received a Japanese education at a "public school" (kōgakkō), while his father also arranged for him to study Taiwanese Chinese at a private school. At that time, students in "public schools" would be severely reprimanded if caught speaking anything other than Japanese by their Japanese teachers. If they dared to talk back, they could even be slapped. As a teenager, Chen was deeply aggrieved by the way Taiwanese people were bullied. He decided to diligently study Chinese every evening, a commitment he sustained for three years.

=== Join Victor records ===
In 1930s Taiwan, under the active promotion and guidance of Columbia Records, Taiwanese pop songs had gradually achieved good sales figures. As a result, other companies, such as Popular (Chinese: 博友樂), Taihei (Chinese: 泰平), and JVC records, also had ambitions to gain a foothold in the pop music market. In 1935, JVC hired Chang Fu-hsing, a graduate of the Ueno School of Music in Tokyo (the predecessor of the present-day Tokyo University of the Arts), to head the literature and art department, and invited Lin Ching-yueh, a graduate of medical school at the time and known as "songwriter physician," to write and select the lyrics for their records. Since the lyrics they solicited were not up-to-date, the recordings they produced and released were not yet comparable to those released by the Columbia Records. When the Arts and Culture Department met to review the situation, Chang recommended Chen Ta-ju, who was living across the street from his house, and frequently recognized Chen's writing.

With Chang Fu-hsing's encouragement, the then 19-year-old Chen wrote the lyrics to about five songs, including "The Daughter's Sutra" (Chinese: 女兒經) and "Fragrance of the Night" (Chinese: 夜來香). After careful examination, Lin Ching-yueh considered that the young man's lyrics already possessed the style of a master, so he adopted them one by one and assigned them to Su Tung and Chen Chiu-lin to compose the music respectively. After the recordings were released, they were well received by the market. By 1936, Chen had composed more than two-thirds of all the songs on Victor Records, making him the pillar of JVC at that time.

Whether it's "White Peony", which describes the heart of a young girl in love, "Youthful Ridge", "Spring Day by Day", or even "Shadow of Two Wild Geese", "Sending Out the Sails", "Sentimental Heart", "The Wine Cup of Sadness", etc., all of these songs created a sensation in Taiwan at that time. Chen was just 20 years old at the time.

There were many composers with whom Chen Ta-ju collaborated with besides Su Tung. There were also Wu Cheng-jia's "We Don't Know", "Heart of the world", "Farewell by the Harbor", Chen Chiu-lin's "White Peony", "Spring Color in the Mountains", "Seven Pendulums of the Zhongshan North Road", and Kueh Giok-lan's "Southern Nocturne". They collaborated in the creation of Taiwan's creative industry. Their collaborations created a new landscape of songwriting in Taiwan.

=== Unemployment and police work ===
In 1938, with the outbreak of the Sino-Japanese War, the rule of Taiwan by the Japanese Taiwan Governor's Office became more and more severe. Due to the active promotion of the imperialization movement the Japanese government induced Taiwanese to speak Japanese and wear Japanese clothes. Record producers also went out of business as a result of the war. These people who lived on songwriting had no means of subsistence and had to find their own way out. Su Tung took up the harp and performed with a medicine troupe selling medicine to make a living. Chen Ta-ju evacuated his family to Pinglin and decided to enter the "Governor's Office Police Superintendent's Prisoner's Training School". After graduating from the police academy, Chen was assigned to work as a police officer in the countryside, and only resigned from the police force after the 28 February Incident, never resuming his job again.

=== Post-War Development ===
After the end of World War II, all industries were in recession. As a man of letters, it was not easy to find a job, but he could not abandon his family's livelihood, so Chen Ta-ju could only return to his old profession and write lyrics again. At that time, the circulation of songs relied on radio broadcasts and singing with singers in temple towns and squares, Chen published songbooks in the name of the "New Taiwan Song and Ballad Society", and commissioned old friends such as Su Tung and Chen Shui-liu to sing and promote these songbooks by singing with drug troupes and singing troupes all over Taiwan. A total of more than ten books were published, and although their income was limited, they were able to make a good living.

In the 1950s, Taiwanese songs were on the decline. The reason for this was that, on the one hand, the Kuomintang regime was pushing Mandarin Chinese over the native Hokkien and Hakka, and Mandarin songs gradually monopolized the record market. On the other hand, most of the Taiwanese ballads from the Japanese rule era were banned from broadcasting by the government because they were considered to be too melancholy. Seeing that Taiwanese ballads had been suppressed to the point of no return, Chen's output declined sharply after 1954, and he eventually gave up singing to serve in the food industry, serving as a manager of Ajinomoto Foods, a senior consultant for Ajinomoto, and a vice president of Ajinomoto, before retiring as vice president of Chen-feng Refrigeration Company, a subsidiary of Chen-feng Wen-hsiang Foods (a producer of Tzu-mu brand baby food). He has been using his other talents in business management.

In 1989, the first Golden Melody Awards, organized by the Republic of China Press Bureau, presented Chen Ta-ju with a "Special Award", giving him the highest respect and recognition for his contributions to the Taiwanese music scene.

In 1992, Chen Ta-ju died of cancer at the age of 75 at the Mackay Memorial Hospital.
