= Roger Yang =

Taiwanese rock singer

- Born: June 5, 1971 (age 55); Kaohsiung, Taiwan
- Occupations: Singer-songwriter, actor
- Years active: 2006–present

Chinese name
- Traditional Chinese: 楊培安
- Simplified Chinese: 杨培安
Transcriptions
Standard Mandarin
- Hanyu Pinyin: Yang Pei-an
- Musical career
- Genres: Pop, Rock & Roll, Jazz, R&B, Rock
- Instruments: Vocals, tambourine
- Labels: Skyhigh Entertainment Co., Ltd. (2006–2013); Warner Music Taiwan (2013–present)
- Formerly of: Dirty Fingers, TNT Band

Roger Yang Pei-an (traditional Chinese: 楊培安; simplified Chinese: 杨培安; pinyin: Yáng Péi'ān; Wade–Giles: Yang Peian; born June 5, 1971) is a Taiwanese rock singer known for breaking out as an "undiscovered" talent at the age of 35 in the Taiwanese music industry with the hit song, "I Believe" (我相信) that established his powerhouse, octave-jumping vocal skills, leading him to be dubbed as the "Iron Lung Prince" (鐵肺王子) by the Taiwanese media and the "Treble God" (高音之神) by his fans. His voice has often compared to late singer-songwriter Zhang Yu-Sheng due to his penchant for singing the latter's songs and their similar ability to sing high notes effortlessly and clearly without using falsetto.

== Early life ==
Born to a firefighter father and a working mother, Yang spent his childhood singing cartoon jingles and show-tunes. His admiration for rock bands like Europe, and later Jon Bon Jovi and Journey, led him to discover his natural talent for singing high notes.

At the age of 17, he began attending the Wenzao Ursuline College of Languages and was discovered by Dick Cowboy, 迪克牛仔 aka 老爹, a music instructor at the school, who was impressed by Yang's raw and unrefined singing talent, inviting Yang to join as backup vocals to a rock band he was mentoring called the "Dirty Fingers". besting out David Huang (黃大煒). when Chang offered words of encouragement, "剛剛唱得不錯喔 – you just sang quite well." The following year, after graduating with a degree in English from Wenzao, on August 1, Yang officially took over as lead singer for the Dirty Fingers when he competed with the band in the 4th Annual YAMAHA Taiwanese National Top Pop Competition (第四屆YAMAHA全國熱門流行音樂大賽), where he would win the Best Singer award.

== Career ==
=== Struggles as a pub singer ===
Upon returning from his conscription duties, Yang, along with former Dirty Fingers guitarist and drummer, formed a new band called "TNT," with Yang headlining as lead vocals.

During his beginning years as a pub singer, Yang often butted heads with customers due to his preference for rock, while patrons would prefer more traditional Chinese and Taiwanese songs. Eventually succumbing to their demands and realizing his limitations as a singer, Yang began in earnest to learn as many Chinese and Taiwanese songs as he could, hoping to develop the natural talent he had, while gaining appreciation for other genres of music outside of rock. As he continued singing in pubs, opportunities would occur, but never officially materialize. Around 1998, he and his band had been performing the now famous song, "永遠永遠" for three years as a part of their lineup in the pubs, as it had been given to them by the song's lyricist, 吳梵, who was a good friend of Yang's, but when renowned Taiwanese singer, Yi Jun Li 李翊君's manager, heard the band perform the song and realized the song's potential was being squandered in a pub atmosphere, requested the band give up the song to her. Unable to refuse as the song was not his, Yang agreed.

His resentment escalated to the point he often directed his anger at customers by purposefully contesting against their wishes. A situation escalated to the point where a drunk customer drew out a gun and demanded Yang finish singing the song the customer had ordered after Yang had smart-mouthed him. Realizing his inability to control his frustration and anger was not only scaring his bandmates and negatively influencing his job, he withdrew from the band and from his occupation as a pub singer.

At the age of 33, having quit as the lead singer for TNT and his job as a pub singer, Yang needed other sources of income and began moonlighting as a radio host in Kaohsiung's FM 98.3 and as a singing teacher (高雄真善美樂器行歌唱教師), having taught and mentored famous students like, Yoga Lin. By 2004, he was receiving bit jobs such as singing the theme song, "天地無聲" for 劫之末世, the 49th season of the Taiwanese Pili series and singing and song-writing for the Taiwanese Professional Baseball League (中華職棒)'s 16th theme song, "Challenge" (挑戰).

=== Rise to fame with "I Believe" ===
From 2004 to 2005, Yang then sank into what he considers, the lowest point of his life, as he truly considered withdrawing entirely from the music industry and contemplated whether a career in singing was an aspiration he still wished to pursue, especially as he was approaching his mid-30s and felt he did not possess the physical profile the industry wanted. Even when his old friend, Chen Guo-Hua (陳國華), had, on the behalf of the president of Skyhigh Entertainment Co., Ltd. record label company, journeyed from Taipei to Kaohsiung to offer Yang the record deal he had longed for all those years singing in the pub, Yang rebuffed the offer believing his career was over. At this point, he had begun immersing himself into preparations for a concert (2005 紀念寶哥演唱會) dedicated in memory to the late Chang Yu-Sheng in Kaohsiung and so when Chen arrived a second time to offer Yang a record deal, Yang rebuffed it again as the stress of the concert was affecting him. Finally, on the Chen's third and final visit to Kaohsiung to offer Yang the record deal, Chen convinced Yang that despite the latter's age, the record label didn't care about his appearance or age, they had been searching for a refreshing sound and they had found it in Yang's voice, and they were willing to gamble on signing Yang if he was willing.

Moved by his friend's perseverance and figuring he had nothing to lose, Yang signed the deal on the spot without even reading the conditions.>

Yang moved from Kaohsiung and began crashing at 迪克牛仔's home as he recorded music in Taipei, working with Chen to complete his album. In 2006, Yang's voice shocked the music industry, when the Taiwanese beer company, Taiwan Beer began airing its commercials with a song Yang had recorded called "I Believe" (我相信) on all major Taiwanese TV broadcasting channels and Yang's powerful vocals belted out the song's inspirational and uplifting message, which was a refreshing change in the Taiwanese entertainment industry. "我相信" instantly became a hit, but the singer remained a mystery, triggering heated discussions amongst message-boards demanding for the singer's identity while debating whether the song was an unreleased song recorded by the late Chang Yu-Sheng prior to his death, because there had not been a voice in the music industry that could compare to Chang's high notes. Yang was then revealed to the public as the singer behind not only "我相信," but other hit songs that year such as "愛上你是一個錯 – Loving you is a mistake" which was the theme song for the Taiwanese broadcast of The Return of the Condor Heroes Chinese drama; "這該死的愛," which Yang had written, and "男人心," both of which were also the theme song and in the OST of the Taiwanese broadcast of Rain's A Love to Kill Korean drama.

The years of singing in pubs had refined Yang's voice to progress from a thin, raw sound to a more robust sound, but it was his ability to control his voice effortlessly even while singing high notes, without using falsetto, that prompted Taiwanese media members to marvel at his voice and for music critics, Bao Xiaosong (包小松) and Bao Xiaobo (包小柏), to dub him as the "Iron Lung Prince" (鐵肺王子) while noting because of his age and experience, that he was a "late bloomer" (大器晚成) heralding a "new age" of music in Taiwan as an "elderly new guy" (高龄新人).

Since its debut, "我相信" has been one of the most demanded songs requested on networks, as well as a "大學生必頂必唱的勵志歌曲" song favored by college students to sing for inspiration, used in elections, and was chosen to be the ending theme song for the 2009 Taiwanese drama, Recruit's Diary. Yang even performed the song on March 14, 2010, as the opening song to the exhibition game between the Los Angeles Dodgers and the Taiwanese Professional Baseball League All-Stars in Kaohsiung.

The song has not only been extremely popular in Taiwan, but also in Mainland China, though nearly three to four years later after its initial release. It was featured in the August 2008 Beijing Olympics, playing during competitions held in the Bird's Nest stadium and the Water Cube. Most notably in Mainland China, Yang was crowned as the "80s Youth God" (80後青年之神).

=== Mid career ===
With his hit single "我相信" taking over the airwaves and receiving critical acclaim from critics and college students, Yang finally achieved his long-awaited dream, officially debuting with "我相信" and releasing his debut album, 2 AM After Midnight (午夜兩點半的我), on June 2, 2006, at the age of 35. The album debuted at number five on the Taiwanese G-Music chart's 21st week. The album would stay on the chart's top 20 for 17 weeks, before bowing out on the 38th week.

Yang began competing in singing shows like 藝能歌喉戰 and making rounds in the Taiwanese talk show circuits, demonstrating the range of his singing abilities and his outstanding command of employing vibrato while singing high notes by often using Shin Band's "死了都要愛" or Chang Yu-Sheng's "我的未來不是夢"and raising them six keys, which led to Chang Fei's endorsement of Yang as the "Iron Lung Prince" (鐵肺王子) and for Bao Xiaosong (包小松) and Bao Xiaobo (包小柏) to further claim he was "Music's 101" (音樂界的101).

When asked if he feels any resentment and indignation at being "discovered" by the public and the music industry at the age of 35, when he had been performing for ten or more years, he says when he was younger he did, but now, he feels many of the past trials he endured have shaped him to become appreciative of the opportunities he received. His burden (at being discovered so late) is his most precious gift, "這個包袱是我最珍貴的禮物", while acknowledging if he had achieved fame at a younger age, he would have lost touch with reality, "名利來得太快。他們都是被眾人捧在手心，但一旦捧你的手鬆開，就沒法回到現實"

With his breakout success in 2006, Yang became highly sought after in 2007 by major companies to have him record music for commercials. Taiwan Beer worked with Yang again to release another batch of commercials featuring Yang singing "盡情看我", which he had written as well. Beijing Perfect World signed Yang to sing the theme song "完美世界" for its MMORPG online game, Perfect World. In February 2007, Yang released his second album, A Perfect World (完美世界) a.k.a. Pei-An Yang's Album No. 2 (楊培安II), which debuted at number four on the Taiwanese G-Music charts. Like his first album, many of the songs in his second album would be selected to be use in Taiwanese broadcast dramas. He would then dabble as an actor, appearing in the stage play, I Want To Be Famous (我要成名) with Dai Ai Ling (戴愛玲). In the play, the two powerhouse vocals would join forces to sing the duet, "Just to See You Again" (只要再看你一眼) to great responses. The success of their collaboration on the duet would prompt him to include the song in his third album.

Aside from being nominated for his first Golden Melody Award, in 2008, Yang released two more albums and held his first joint concert. That year, he would release his third studio album, Pei-An Yang's Album No.3 (楊培安III), on February 6, which debuted at number 17 on the Taiwanese G-Music Mandarin chart's 5th week, before moving up to the sixth and fourth spot in its second and third weekof release respectively. The album would feature a more diverse genre of music than his previous albums, including two duets and two rock songs. Besides the duet with Ling, Yang recorded the second duet on his album with best friend, Hsiao Huang-chi. The duet, "You Are Always Here" (你一直都在) was composed by Xiao, written by Yang, and dedicated to Chang Yu-Sheng. In honor of Chang, he also covered Chang's classic "大海." He then held his first joint concert tour, joining forces with Xiao, to stage the best-selling joint tour, Hsiao Huang-chi & Yang Pei-An 2008 Tour (蕭煌奇&楊培安2008巡迴演唱會). With the success of the tour, Yang released his fourth live album, 10,000 Thanks ... Live & More, which featured live recordings from his concert with Xiao. He gained even more exposure and recognition when he served as a guest judge on the third season of the hit TV talent show One Million Star (超級星光大道).

After promoting the World Games, Yang would return to recording music in the studios and in May 2009, he and Marty Young held a series of joint concerts called, Yang Pei-An VS Marty Young – Rock the Night, a first time collaboration between the two artists. And on July 31, 2009, Yang would release his fourth CD, the extended play entitled 抒‧情.

BBy 2010, the name Yang Pei-An was now highly associated with singing high notes, and Yang wanted to distinguish himself as more than a singer that could sing high notes. Thus, on July 21, 2010, he held his first large-scale solo concert, called Yang Pei-An: 2010 Back to the Ego (楊培安【2010 Back to the Ego：回歸自我】演唱會) at Legacy Taipei, to tell his story through his music, about his 12-year struggle on the pub circuit before landing a record contract and releasing his debut album at the age of 35. At the concert, he would perform his newest song tentatively titled, "彩虹的盡頭," written by himself, that has yet to be released. In December, one of his new songs, "就是要你管" was chosen as one of the theme songs for the Chiayi City's International Band Festival. Throughout the month, Yang was slated to perform at many events, but became gravely ill and hospitalized mid-December, forcing him to cancel many scheduled events. Though still recovering, he would make his return at the 2011 E-Da World's New Years Concert in Kaohsiung to perform three songs.

Yang confirmed on January 13, 2011, that he has been in the studio working on his new album, with 8 songs recorded and completed, which would be released some time after Chinese New Years. After a two-year hiatus from recording music, the album, entitled, The Seeds of Hope was officially released on March 11, 2011, debuting in at fourth on the Taiwanese G-Music Mandarin chart's 11th week.

== Personal life ==
Though Yang is private regarding his personal life, he has been willing to discuss to the media about his struggles in the pub circuit and his relationship with close friends, mentors, and mentees. He considers his mentor, 老爹, to be a second father figure.

Around 2002, through the suggestion of a mentor that felt Yang's singing was not expressive enough, he was introduced to Hsiao Huang-chi, who was then unknown and was performing at a pub near Yang. Yang obliged to attend Xiao's performance and upon listening, became so moved by the blind singer's performance, he immediately strived to become Xiao's friend and better himself as a singer. Over the years, the two became best friends, even opening a joint concert in 2008, attending award shows together (with Yang attending the 2010 Golden Melody Award in place of the nominated Xiao when Xiao could not attend the show due to scheduling conflicts), and singing duets on each other's albums. Their duet "你一直都在" would be dedicated to Chang and feature Yang as the lyricist and Xiao as the composer. For Xiao's 2008 album, 我是蕭煌奇, their duet, "共鳴," is a song about their friendship.

Understanding the difficulty of succeeding in the music industry, Yang has been supportive of burgeoning artists at his label, often singing duets with them, performing songs written by them on his albums, or promoting their albums with them. For his recent album, The Seeds of Hope (希望的種子), the first single released was a nu metal collaboration between himself and his fellow record label mates, Chemical Monkeys (化學猴子). In 2006, he recorded a duet with Xu Jinhao (許晉豪), a cover of the Michael Jackson and Paul McCartney collaboration "The Girl is Mine," called "心愛的她," which would be released on Xu's only album with Yang's record label. With Meeia, he recorded the duet called, "有你有明天," which was released on his EP, 抒‧情, and when Meeia released her first EP in January 2010, he performed the song with her at promotional events. In early 2010, he also went on a series of talk show circuits in Taiwan with Kelvin Tan to promote Tan's third album release. Later in May 2010, he would do the same to promote his mentee, Lin Zongxing's (林宗興), first extended play release, having mentored Lin since Lin graduated from high school and offering words of encouragement to former student Yoga Lin.

== Discography ==
=== Studio albums ===
Year	Album Details	Chart positions	Track listing
Year	Album Details	Taiwan	Track listing
2006	2AM After Midnight 午夜兩點半的我: Release date: August 2006; 1st Studio album; Formats: CD, digital download	5	Track listing: 1. "我相信"; 2. "這該死的愛"; 3. "午夜兩點半的我"; 4. "下雨天"; 5. "天天都想你"; 6. "男人心"; 7. "只有我做得到"; 8. "因為你...因為愛"; 9. "愛上你是一個錯"; 10. "風雨中的羽翼"; 11. "今宵多珍重"
2007	Roger Yang 2 楊培安II: Release date: February 2007; 2nd Studio album; Formats: CD, digital download	4	Track listing: 1. "痛也不說出口的我"; 2. "完美世界"; 3. "謝謝讓我愛上你"; 4. "盡情看我"; 5. "愛不能從頭"; 6. "快樂的歌"; 7. "愛是飛翔還是墜落"; 8. "讓全世界為我們加油"; 9. "永恆"; 10. "陽光燦爛的日子"; 11. "小小羊兒要回家"
2008	Roger Yang, Vol. 3 楊培安III: Release date: February 2008; 3rd Studio album; Formats: CD, digital download	4	Track listing: 1. "假裝"; 2. "沒有白活"; 3. "你一直都在" (featuring 蕭煌奇); 4. "Dusky Angel"; 5. "只要再看你一眼" (featuring 戴愛玲); 6. "你離去"; 7. "我的驕傲"; 8. "等待"; 9. "流淚的河"; 10. "酸風柳樹"; 11. "大海"
2008	10000 Thanks...Live And More: Release date: June 2008; 1st Live album; Formats: CD, digital download	10	Track listing: 1. "組曲 – 小小羊兒要回家 + 流淚的河"; 2. "風中的羽翼" (ft. 蕭煌奇); 3. "組曲 – 科學小飛俠 + 小甜甜 + 無敵鐵金剛"; 4. "Faithfully"; 5. "ラブ‧スト─リ─は突然に (突然發生的愛情故事)"; 6. "組曲-這該死的愛 / 痛也不說出口的我"; 7. "假裝"; 8. "我相信"; 9. "大海"; 10. "Careless Whisper" (featuring 蕭煌奇); 11. "一樣的月光" (featuring 蕭煌奇); 12. "親愛的小孩" (featuring 六個小孩); 13. "真我最自由" (featuring 鹿鼎記); 14. "感恩的心" (featuring 阿信)
2009	Ballad 抒‧情 – EP: Release date: July 2009; 1st Extended play; Formats: CD, digital download	N/A	Track listing: 1. "有你有明天" (featuring 符瓊音); 2. "左邊右邊"; 3. "忘記你不如失去你"; 4. "故事未完成" (featuring 劉虹翎); 5. "Without You"
2011	The Seeds of Hope 希望的種子: Release date: March 2011; 4th Studio album; Formats: CD, digital download	3	Track listing: 1. "夢想從心開始"; 2. "浴火鳳凰" (featuring 化學猴子); 3. "月光"; 4. "彩虹的盡頭"; 5. "I'm Fine"; 6. "就是要你管"; 7. "愛的奇蹟"; 8. "沒有不可能的事"; 9. "感謝有你"; 10. "希望的種子"
2014	Beast in the Dark 沈睡的野獸: Release date: January 7, 2014; 5th Studio album; Formats: CD, digital download		Track listing: 1. 沈睡的野獸; 2. 戀人無雙; 3. 說好各走五十步; 4. Nothing But The End; 5. 最短的愛情; 6. 夢在前方; 7. 模樣; 8. 乾脆一點; 9. 信仰; 10. 共同的記憶
2015	Autism 不屬於我的世界: Release date: December 4, 2015; 5th Studio album; Formats: CD, digital download		Track listing: 1. 黑寡婦; 2. 美人與英雄; 3. 掀底牌; 4. 冷耳光; 5. 心不跳了; 6. 哪怕我很小; 7. 我就是傻; 8. 最好的結束; 9. 了斷; 10. 旁觀; 11. 愛入膏肓

=== As featured artist ===
Year	Song	Chart positions	Album
Year	Song	Taiwan	Album
2006	"心愛的她" (許晉豪 featuring 楊培安)	N/A	我愛你
2007	"光輝歲月" (迪克牛仔 featuring 楊培安)	N/A	風飛沙
2008	"共鳴" (蕭煌奇 featuring 楊培安)	N/A	我是蕭煌奇
2010	"只要再看你一眼" (戴愛玲 featuring 楊培安)	N/A	跳痛
2010	"不能等" (符瓊音 featuring 楊培安)	10	很久没哭了

=== Other works ===
Year	Song	Chart positions	Album	Role
Year	Song	Taiwan	Album	Role
1989	"就是我" (楊培安)	N/A	彩色的年纪 (Colorful Age) OST – May 26, 1989	Singer
2005	"天地無聲" (楊培安)	N/A	劫之末世 OST	Singer
2005	"挑戰" (楊培安)	N/A	中華職棒 OST	Writer, Singer
2008	"看見全世界" (楊培安)	N/A	2009 Kaohsiung World Games OST	Singer
2008	"High Five" (楊培安)	N/A	2009 Kaohsiung World Games OST	Singer
2010	"就是要你管" (楊培安)	N/A	2010 Chiayi City's International Band Festival Theme song	Singer
2011	"夢見" (楊培安)	N/A	Original demo of 夢見 by Chang Yu-Sheng	Singer

=== DVD releases ===
Yang has released two CD+DVD albums.

Year	Album Details	Chart positions	Track Listings
Year	Album Details	Taiwan	Track Listings
2007	楊培安II: Release date: February 2006; 2nd Studio album; Formats: CD+DVD	4	Track listing: 1. "痛也不說出口的我"; 2. "完美世界"; 3. "謝謝讓我愛上你"; 4. "盡情看我"; 5. "愛不能從頭"; 6. "快樂的歌"; 7. "愛是飛翔還是墜落"; 8. "讓全世界為我們加油"; 9. "永恆"; 10. "陽光燦爛的日子"; 11. "小小羊兒要回家"
2008	10000 Thanks...Live And More: Release date: June 2008; 4th Studio album; Formats: CD+DVD	N/A	Track listing: 1. "組曲 – 小小羊兒要回家 + 流淚的河"; 2. "風中的羽翼" (ft. 蕭煌奇); 3. "組曲 – 科學小飛俠 + 小甜甜 + 無敵鐵金剛"; 4. "Faithfully"; 5. "ラブ‧スト─リ─は突然に (突然發生的愛情故事)"; 6. "組曲-這該死的愛 / 痛也不說出口的我"; 7. "假裝"; 8. "我相信"; 9. "大海"; 10. "Careless Whisper" (featuring 蕭煌奇); 11. "一樣的月光" (featuring 蕭煌奇); 12. "親愛的小孩" (featuring 六個小孩); 13. "真我最自由" (featuring 鹿鼎記); 14. "感恩的心" (featuring 阿信)

== Live concerts and tours ==
In addition to performing nearly 100 performances for live events, live concerts, promotional events, and small scale venues; Yang has also held two joint tours and one headlining solo concert within Taiwan.

Year	Title	Duration	Number of performances
2008	Hsiao Huang-chi & Yang Pei-An 2008 Tour (蕭煌奇&楊培安2008巡迴演唱會)	May 2, 2008 (Kaioshung); May 10, 2008 (Taichung); May 17, 2008 (Taipei)	3
Yang's first concert tour experience was with best friend, Hsiao Huang-chi. The joint concert was held in three cities, starting first at Kaioshung, then in Taichung, before ending in Taipei. The tour was a success, selling out at all venues.
2009	Yang Pei-An VS Marty Young – Rock the Night (楊培安 VS Marty Young – Rock the Night)	May 6, 2009 (Taipei); January 16, 2010 (Taipei)	2
Through a co-worker's suggestion, Yang collaborated with Marty Youngand the Marty Young Band on two concerts that occurred in 2009 and 2010. The first was on May 6, 2009. The second on January 16, 2010
2010	Yang Pei-An: 2010 Back to the Ego (楊培安 2010 Back to the Ego：回歸自我 演唱會)	July 21, 2010 (Taipei)	1
Yang's first solo concert held in Taipei.
