= 32nd Golden Melody Awards =

Taiwan music awards ceremony in 2021

- Date: August 21, 2021 (Popular music)
- Venue: Taipei Music Center (Popular music)
- Country: Taiwan
- Hosted by: Lulu
- Website: gma.tavis.tw/gm32/index.htm

Television/radio coverage
- Network: TTV

The 32nd Golden Melody Awards (Chinese: 第32屆金曲獎) take place in Taipei, Taiwan in 2021. The ceremony was scheduled for 26 June 2021 in Taipei Arena, but rescheduled to 21 August, due to the COVID-19 pandemic, and moved to the Taipei Music Center. This marked the second time GMA was held in the midst of COVID-19 pandemic after the 31st edition, both of which was held at the same location.

== Winners and nominees ==
Below is the list of winners and nominees for the popular music categories.

Vocal category – Record label awards
Album of the Year	Song of the Year
Gain Strength – Sangpuy; Dear All – Wanfang; Where is SHI? – Shi Shi; Time Will Tell – Hebe Tien; Home Cookin – Soft Lipa; Sounds of My Life – William Wei; Shi Ri Tan – James Li; Ten – Henry Hsu; tsu-pun – Olivia Tsao; ū lí ê kòo-sū – aoi; Kā lí sioh sioh – Hao Zi; Gentleman with No Shoes – Sibongie; First Half – Hanya Chang; Khah-lah Thien-thoì – Siàu-lú khah-lah; Those tree years – Yu-Wei Hsieh; Till – ChuNoodle; When the sun rises – Wing Lo; Ah-Min – JiuLianZhenRen; Rambling Naluwan – Dakanow; How are you, my dear – Syaman macinanao; žž – žž; Lady of the ocean – Outlet Drift	"Your Name Engraved Herein" (from Your Name Engraved Herein) – Crowd Lu; "A Vacant Seat" (from Dear All) – Wanfang; "Bo Fu" (from Outta Body) – E.SO; "When Tomorrow Comes feat. ?te" (from tsu-pun) – Olivia Tsao and ?te; "Where I Lost Us" (from Easy Come, Easy Go) – Accusefive; "Embrace" (from Gain Strength) – Sangpuy; "Because Of You" (from Because Of You) – Mayday
Best Mandarin Album	Best Taiwanese Album
Home Cookin – Soft Lipa; Dear All – Wanfang; Where is SHI? – Shi Shi; Time Will Tell – Hebe Tien; Sounds of My Life – William Wei; Shi Ri Tan – James Li	tsu-pun – Olivia Tsao; Ten – Henry Hsu; ū lí ê kòo-sū – aoi; Kā lí sioh sioh – Hao Zi; Gentleman with No Shoes – Sibongie; First Half – Hanya Chang
Best Hakka Album	Best Aboriginal Album
Till – ChuNoodle; Khah-lah Thien-thoì – Siàu-lú khah-lah; Those tree years – Yu-Wei Hsieh; When the sun rises – Wing Lo; Ah-Min – JiuLianZhenRen	Lady of the ocean – Outlet Drift; Rambling Naluwan – Dakanow; Gain Strength – Sangpuy; How are you, my dear – Syaman macinanao; žž – žž
Best Music Video	
"Home Cookin" (from Home Cookin) – Director: Cowper Wang; "Hunger Game" (from Yellow Fiction) – Director: Jyun Chang; "mài-mng _rock version" (from Little Hilly) – Director: Pei-Yu Liao and Zhi-Zhong Tang; "Ballerina" (from Bedtime Story) – Director: Mich Yeh; "Night Creepers" (from Ah-Min) – Director: Oneness Zeng; "Candlelight (feat. Oh Hyuk)" (from Soft Storm) – Director: DQM; "Until I Met You" (from If Only You Could Love Me) – Director: Remii Huang; "One, after Another" (from Time Will Tell) – Director: Muh Chen	
Vocal category – Individual awards
Best Female Mandarin Singer	Best Male Mandarin Singer
Time Will Tell – Hebe Tien; Dear All – Wanfang; LOVE, AND YET... – Panai Kusui; Where is SHI? – Shi Shi; Every Side of Me – Tarcy Su; 3811 – Sitar Tan	Home Cookin – Soft Lipa; Outta Body – E.SO; Drifter · Like You Do – JJ Lin; Folio Vol. 1 One and One – Wu Qing-feng; Sounds of My Life – William Wei; Shi Ri Tan – James Li
Best Female Taiwanese Singer	Best Male Taiwanese Singer
tsu-pun – Olivia Tsao; Dream of Suzie – Angel Chu; If You Wanna Know Me – Kelly Tsai; Irochigai – Huang Fei; First Half – Hanya Chang	Ten – Henry Hsu; Kavalan Kites – Su-Hao Yang; Wu Bai & China Blue Thàu lâm Hong Concert Live – Wu Bai; Kā lí sioh sioh – Hao Zi; Waiting For Daybreak - Ric Jan
Best Aboriginal Singer	Best Hakka Singer
Gain Strength – Sangpuy; Rambling Naluwan – Dakanow; Meander to the Horizon – Lowking; mziboq su – Ciwas Losin; žž – žž	When the sun rises – Wing Lo; Onga Onga – Robin Tseng; Those tree years – Yu-Wei Hsieh; Out There – Pei-Shu Huang; Till – ChuNoodle
Best Vocal Group	Best New Artist
Dear Adult – The Wanted; Messenger – Night Keepers; FALI-mini album-929 – FALI; Seen it all? – Chang and Lee; Leyou Height – Astro Bunny	A Bedroom of One's Own – ?te; Yellow Fiction – YELLOW; Yuba Youth – Heat Sketch; Diamond in the Rough – Howard Lee; ū lí ê kòo-sū – aoi; The Fool – Bestards; If Only You Could Love Me – Yo Lee
Best Composition	Best Lyrics
"AnHe" (from Every Side of Me) – Hush (Performer: Tarcy Su); "Flavor" (from tsu-pun) – Olivia Tsao and Baby-C (Performer: Olivia Tsao); "Where I Lost Us" (from Easy Come, Easy Go) – Edward Pan (Performer: Accusefive); "Embrace" (from Gain Strength) – Sangpuy (Performer: Sangpuy); "I Wrote a Song for You" (from Sounds of My Life) – William Wei (Performer: William Wei); "I Missed You" (from I Missed You) – Eve Ai (Performer: Eve Ai)	"Untold" (from Time Will Tell) – David Ke (Performer: Hebe Tien); "A Vacant Seat" (from Dear All) – Ting Huang (Performer: Wanfang); "Bo Fu" (from Outta Body) – E.SO (Performer: E.SO); "Wang Shih Lives in Memory" (from tsu-pun) – Bu-hiông (Performer: Olivia Tsao); "Drifter" (from Drifter · Like You Do) – Xiaohan (Performer: JJ Lin); "The Spider" (from Home Cookin) – Soft Lipa (Performer: Soft Lipa)
Best Music Arrangement	Producer of the Year, Album
"Flavor" (from tsu-pun) – Baby-C (Performer: Olivia Tsao); "Dazzled" (from Dear All) – Huang Shao-yong (Performer: Wanfang); "Danshari" (from Museum of Tears) – Tsai Yu-liang (Performer: Xing Zheng); "Miss Understanding" (from Miss Understanding) – YELLOW (Performer: Amuyi); "Last Animals" (from Last Animals) – Kyle Lu (Performer: JADE); "Dear Humans" (from Dear Humans) – Elephant Gym (Performer: Elephant Gym)	Time Will Tell – George Chen (Performer: Hebe Tien); Dear All – Kay Huang (Performer: Wanfang); tsu-pun – ZioN and Olivia Tsao (Performer: Olivia Tsao); Where is SHI? – MCKY, RAZOR, Shi Shi (Performer: Shi Shi); Gain Strength – Jen-Yi Tseng, Tzu-lung Hung, Sangpuy (Performer: Sangpuy); Shi Ri Tan – James Li and Jun Yan (Performer: James Li)
Producer of the Year, Single	Best Band
"Noodles" (from Home Sweet Home) – Khalil Fong (Performer: Khalil Fong); "Bad Weather" (from Unique) – CinCin Lee (Performer: Michael Wong); "Mojito" (from Mojito) – Jay Chou (Performer: Jay Chou); "Strange Weather" (from Strange Weather) – YELLOW and Chia-Lun Yue (Performer: YELLOW and 9m88); "Your Name Engraved Herein" (from Your Name Engraved Herein) – Yanis Huang (Performer: Crowd Lu); "Self Harmony" (from Self Harmony) – Arai Soichiro (Performer: Karen Mok and Evan Guo)	Soft Storm – Sunset Rollercoaster; Black & Toughness – OVDS; Water Snowflake Goes to Market – Sheng Xiang & Band; Alternate Moments – KST; Easy Come, Easy Go – Accusefive; Lady of the Ocean – Outlet Drift; Bird and Reflections – Deca Joins
Instrumental category – Record label awards
Best Instrumental Album	
The Adventures of Pie Boy – The Spice Cabinet; The Path – Chien Chien Lu; KUNG's vol. 1 – Kung Yu-chi; Stream Legend – Spectro 7; Synthetic Steps – TTechmak	
Instrumental category – Individual awards
Producer of the Year, Instrumental	Best Instrumental Composition
noista/gia – hirsk; Stream Legend – Alex Wu; Don’t Get Too Comfortable – Matt Fullen; Your Name Engraved Herein (Original Soundtrack) – Chris Hou; The Adventures of Pie Boy – Terry Hsieh and Derrick Sepnio	"Bitter Sweet" (from The Adventures of Pie Boy) – Terry Hsieh and Derrick Sepnio; "The Path" (from The Path) – Chien Chien Lu; "Clarity" (from Clarity) – Lawrence Ku; "Synthetic Steps" (from Synthetic Steps) – Toby Mak; "Dali Girl" (from The Adventures of Pie Boy) – Terry Hsieh and Derrick Sepnio
Technical category – Individual awards
Best Album Design	
ZETA – Qing-yang Xiao; LOVE, AND YET... – Shi-Ching Yang; Water Snowflake Goes to Market – Mirr Lo, Chun Yung Lin, Ken Cheng Lee; Time Will Tell – Yueh Yueh Liu; Gain Strength – Gelresai; METROPOLIS – Aaron Nieh and Even Chen	
Technical category – Record label awards
Best Vocal Recording Album	Best Instrumental Recording Album
Where is SHI? – Recording Engineers: AJ Chen, Jansen Chen, Chou Han Tsay, Jonathan Liu, Fengtse Hsieh, Yu, Chris Chen, Micky Yang Main Mixing Engineers: AJ Chen, Chou Han Tsay, Wei Ming Shan, Double, Itun Chou, Kenny Main Mastering Post-Production: Dave kutch; Drawing Dialogue – Recording Engineers: AKNIT, Andy Baker, Chung Cheng Yang, Chou Han Tsay, Wei Ming Shan, Koffkoff, Martin Lin, Chelin Liu, Liu Shih Wei Main Mixing Engineers: AKNIT, Ziya Huang, Liu Shih Wei Main Mastering Post-Production: AKNIT, Misi Ke; Easy Come, Easy Go – Recording Engineers: Yu Hsuan Yeh, Chou Han Tsay, Micky Yang, Zen Chien, SHENB Main Mixing Engineers: Ziya Huang Main Mastering Post-Production: Randy Merrill; Gain Strength – Recording Engineers: Hao Wen Tay, David Wang (Strings) Main Mixing Engineers: Keller Wang, Jerry Lin, Chun-hsien Huang, Hao Wen Tay Main Mastering Post-Production: Ted Jensen; PORTAL – Recording Engineers: Chia Chen Chang Main Mixing Engineers: Itun Chou Main Mastering Post-Production: Chris Gehringer	The Adventures of Pie Boy – Recording Engineers: You Li Main Mixing Engineers: Wei Ming Shan Main Mastering Post-Production: Randy Merrill; Eternal Journey – Recording Engineers: Clark Germain, Chris Bitoun, Vladimir Martinka Main Mixing Engineers: Clark Germain Main Mastering Post-Production: Chris Bellman; Fly By Light – Recording Engineers: Zen Chien Main Mixing Engineers: Zen Chien Main Mastering Post-Production: Zen Chien; The Path – Recording Engineers: Alex Conroy Main Mixing Engineers: David Darlington Main Mastering Post-Production: David Darlington; Clarity – Recording Engineers: Teddy Zeng, Damien Banzigou Main Mixing Engineers: Damien Banzigou Main Mastering Post-Production: Randy Merrill
Special Contribution Award
Lo Ta-yu
Jury Award
Dear All – Wanfang
