= Bestards =

Taiwanese musical group

Bestards 理想混蛋
- Origin: Taipei, Taiwan
- Genres: Mandopop; pop rock; folk-pop; Hokkien pop
- Years active: 2017–present
- Label: HIM International Music
- Members: Ji-ding (雞丁); A-jhe (阿哲); Chien-ting (建廷); Look

Bestards (Chinese: 理想混蛋) is a Taiwanese band.

The band was established in 2017. Its members are Ji-ding, Chien-ting, A-jhe, and Look. After they published their debut album "The Fool" (愚者) in 2020, they received a nomination for Best New Artist at the 32nd Golden Melody Awards the following year.
