= Chang Yu-sheng Memorial Museum =

Museum in Magong, Penghu, Taiwan

- 張雨生紀念館
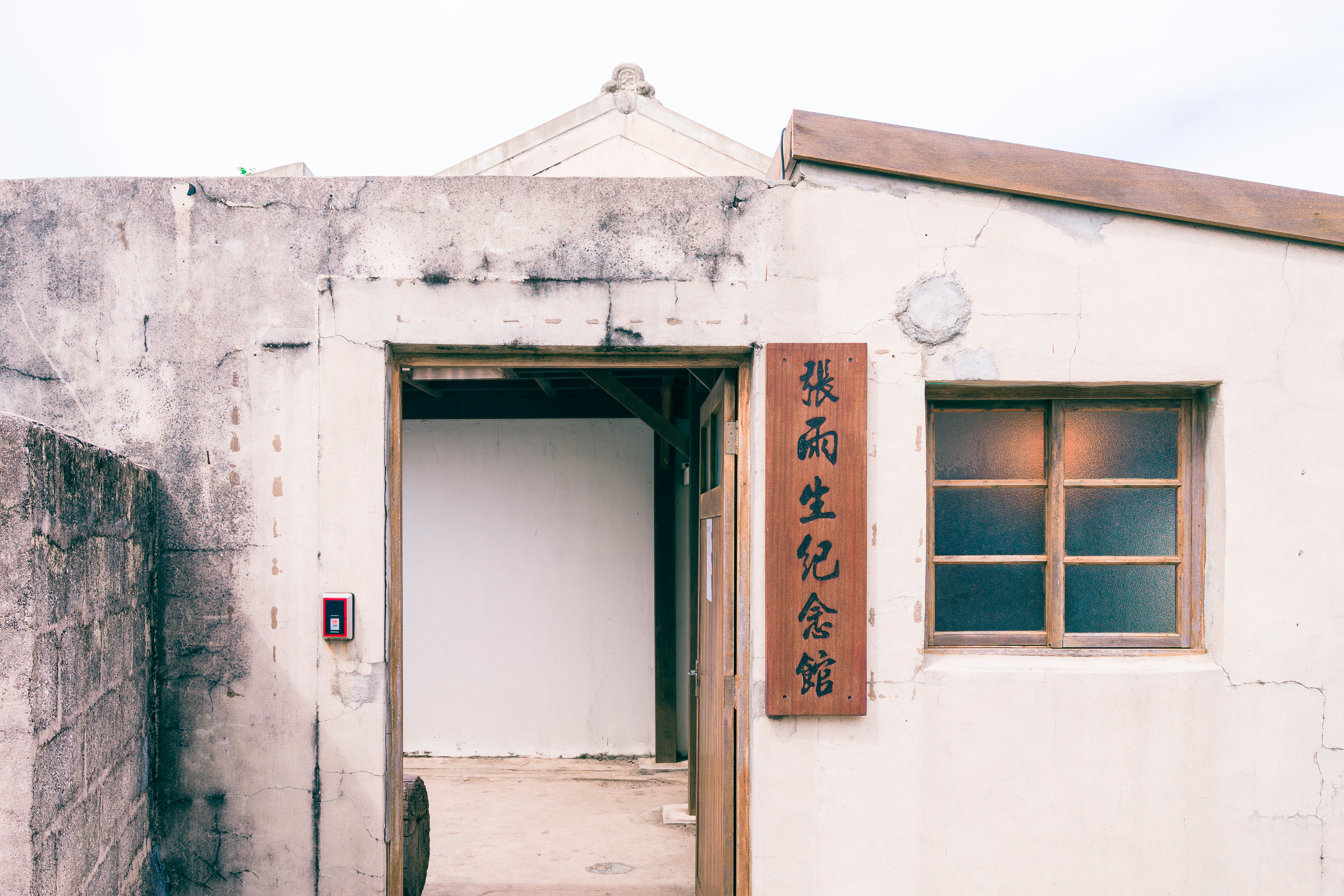
- Location: Magong, Penghu, Taiwan
- Coordinates: 23°33′47.8″N 119°33′37.6″E
- Type: museum

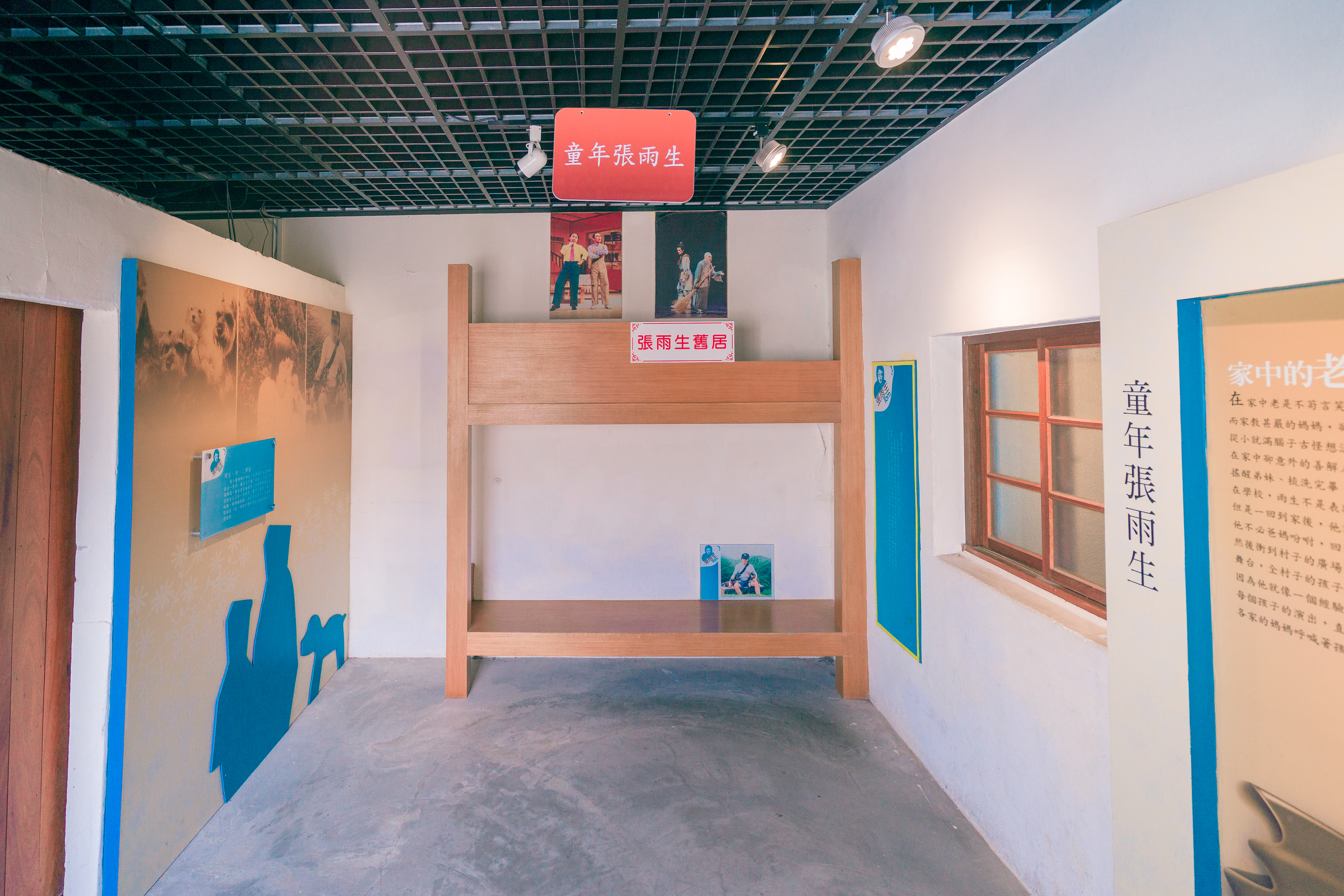
Chang Yu-sheng Memorial Museum exhibition hall

The Chang Yu-sheng Memorial Museum (traditional Chinese: 張雨生紀念館; simplified Chinese: 张雨生纪念馆; pinyin: Zhāng Yǔshēng Jìniànguǎn) is a museum about singer Chang Yu-sheng in Magong City, Penghu County, Taiwan.

== Architecture ==
Located in Duxing 10th Village within a former military dependent's village, the museum is located at Chang's childhood home. The museum building also includes the adjacent houses of number 16, 18 and 20.

== Exhibitions ==
The museum consists of four exhibition areas. It exhibits Chang's various works and legacy.

== See also ==
- List of museums in Taiwan
