= Golden Melody Award for Best Mandarin Album =

Taiwanese music award

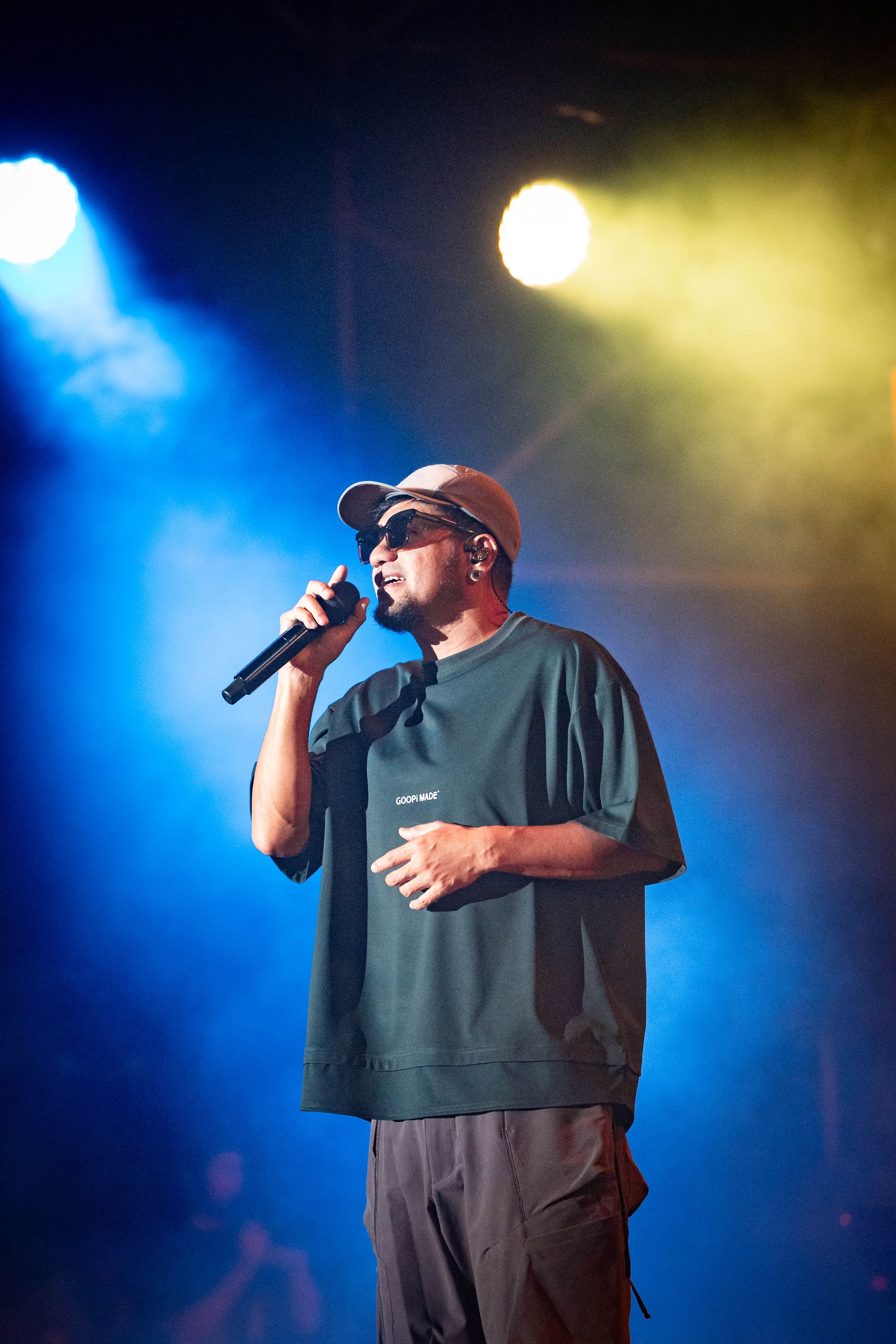
- Go With The Flow by Ayal Komod is the 2026 recipient.
- Awarded for: Quality Mandopop vocal albums
- Country: Taiwan
- Presented by: Ministry of Culture
- First award: 2005
- Currently held by: Ayal Komod – Go With The Flow (2026)
- Website: gma.tavis.tw

The Golden Melody Award for Best Mandarin Album (Chinese: 金曲獎最佳華語專輯獎) is an honor presented at the annual Golden Melody Awards, a ceremony that was established in 1990, to recording artists for quality Mandopop music albums.

The honor was first presented in 2005 as Best Mandarin Pop Vocal Album at the 16th Golden Melody Awards to Sandee Chan for Then We All Wept in Silence. In 2007, the category became known as Best Mandarin Album. Tanya Chua and Jay Chou currently hold the record for the most nominations, with six each, followed by A-Mei with five.

== Recipients ==
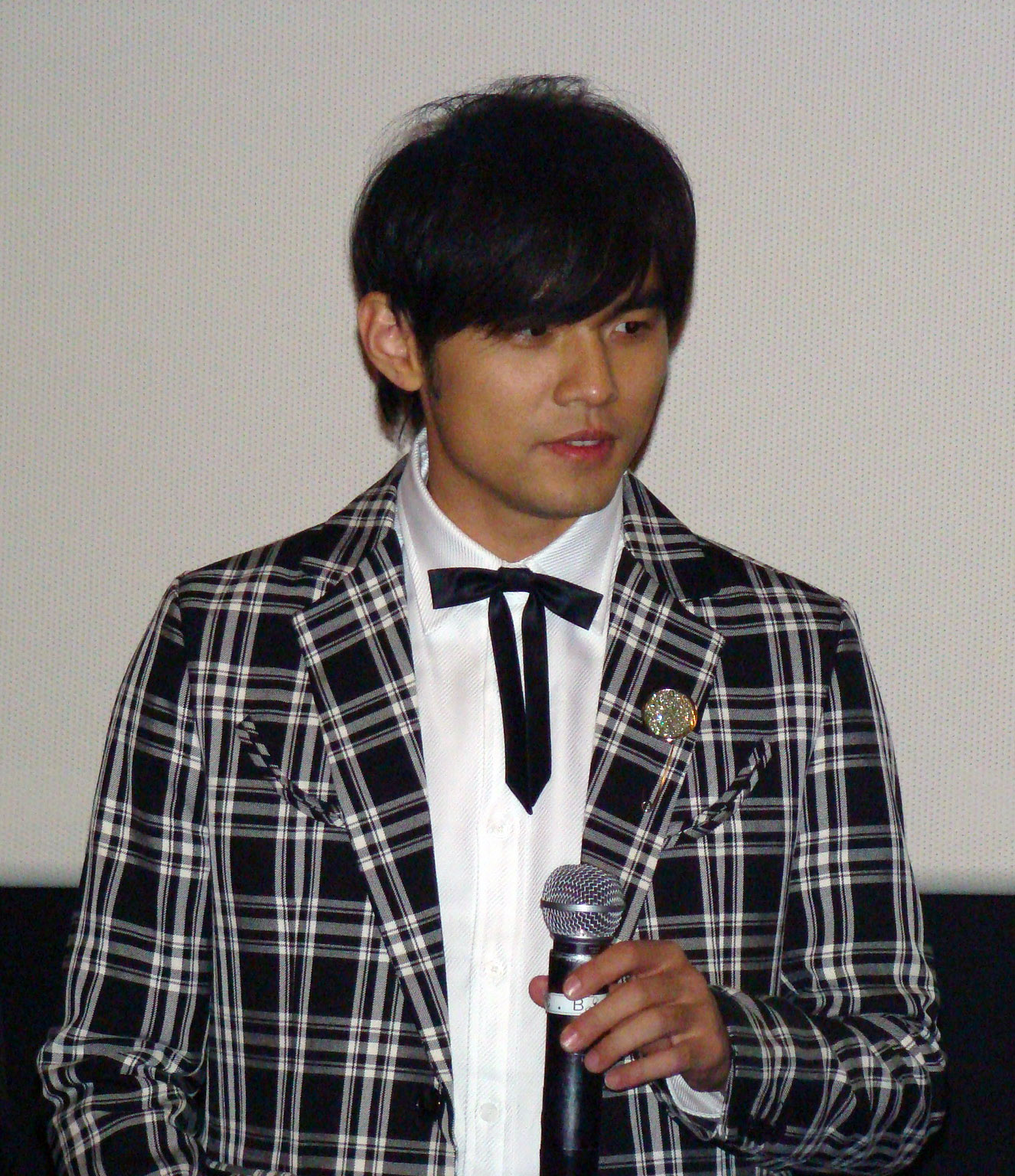
Six-time nominee received the most nominations in this category, including one-time award winner Jay Chou

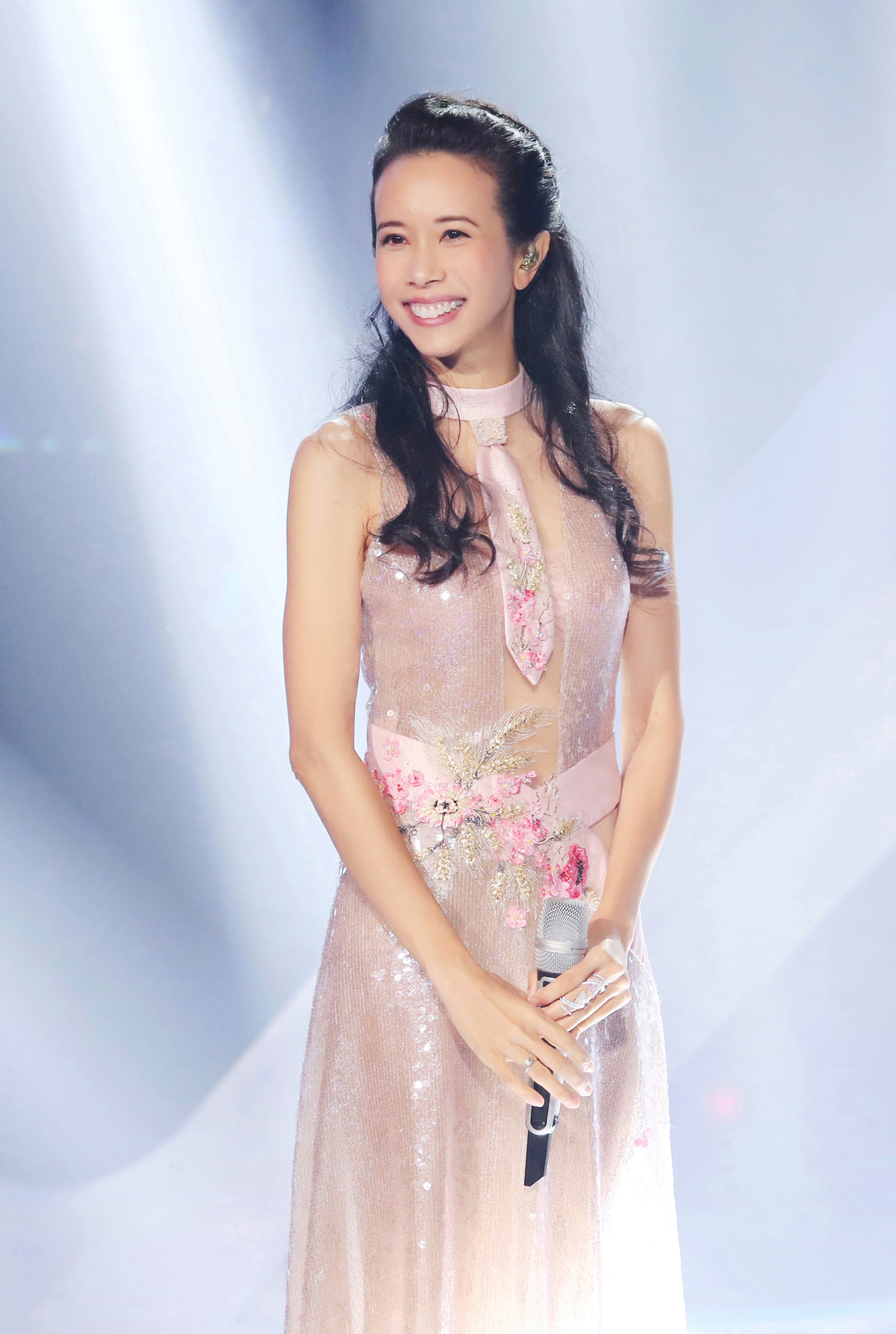
Four-time nominee, including one-time award winner Karen Mok

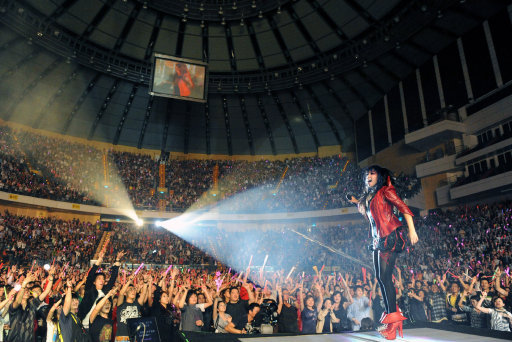
Three-time nominee, including one-time award winner A-Mei

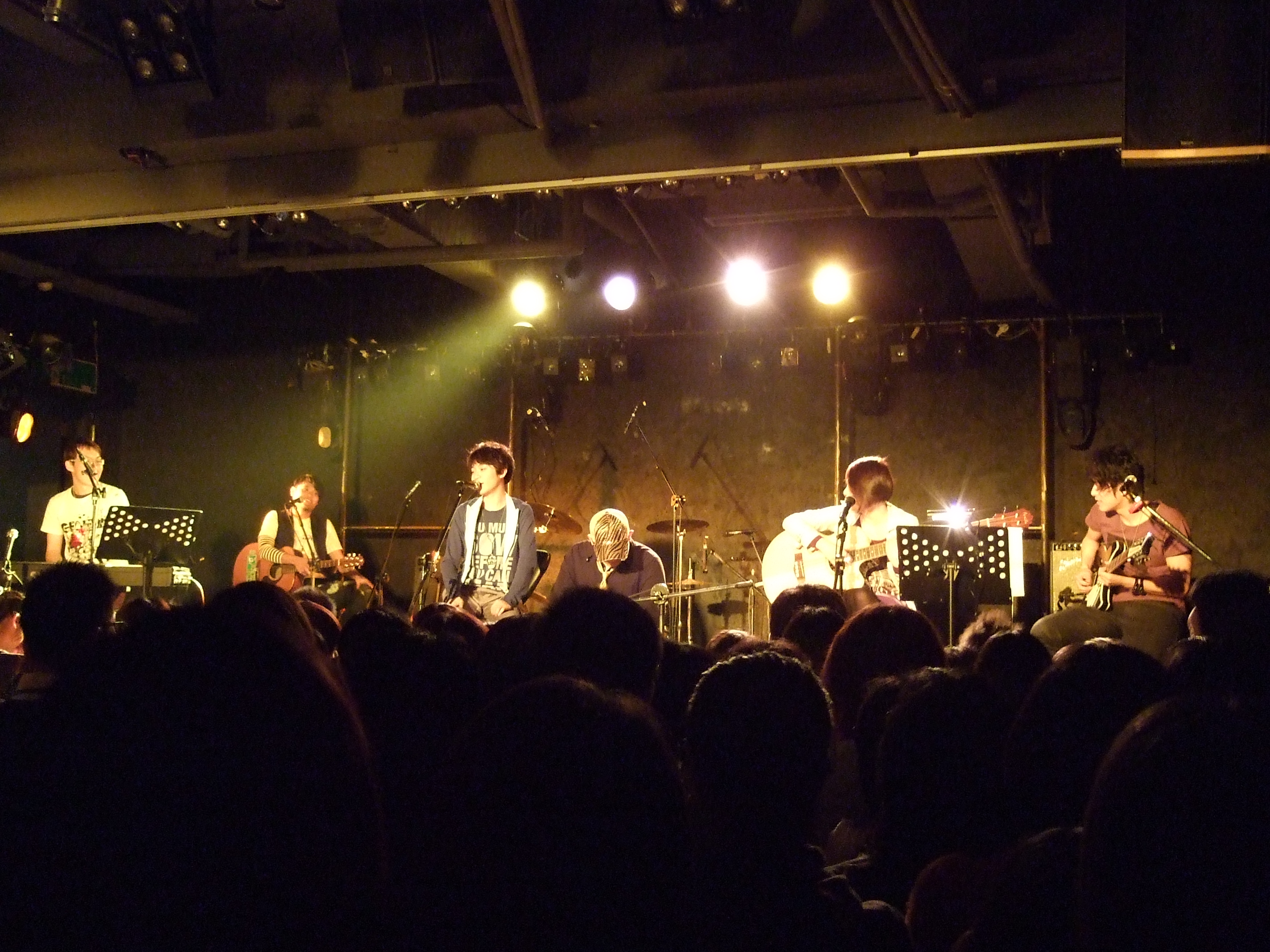
Three-time nominee, including one-time award winner Sodagreen

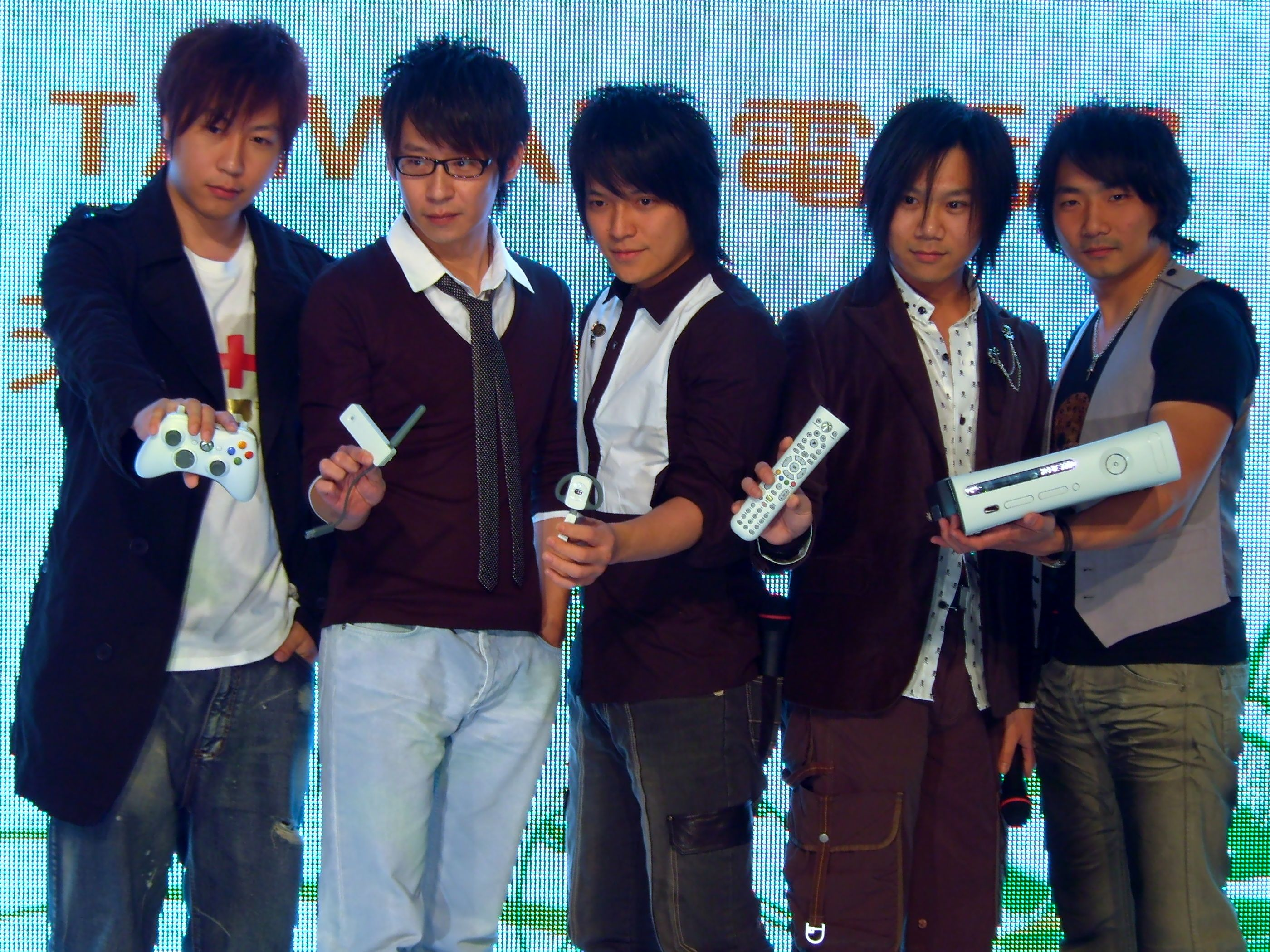
Two-time nominee, including two-time award winner Mayday

Year	Performing artist(s)	Work	Nominees	Ref.
2005	Sandee Chan	Then We All Wept in Silence	Jay Chou – Common Jasmin Orange; Natural Q – C'est La Vie; Stefanie Sun – Stefanie; Biung – Man Fights with Wind; Stanley Huang – Shades of My Mind; Wang Leehom – Shangri-La	
2006	David Tao	The Great Leap	Kimbo – In a Flash; Cheer Chen – Peripeteia; Tanya Chua – Amphibian; Penny Tai – Crazy Love	
2007	MC HotDog	Wake Up	Hao-en and Jiajia – Blue in Love; Deserts Chang – My Life Will...; Sodagreen – Little Universe; Jyotsna Pang – All I Want; Jolin Tsai – Dancing Diva	
2008	Karen Mok	L!ve Is...	Sodagreen – Incomparable Beauty; A-Mei – Star; Stefanie Sun – Against the Light; Tanya Chua – Goodbye & Hello; Jay Chou – On the Run	
2009	Eason Chan	Don't Want to Let Go	Sandee Chan – What If It Matters; Crowd Lu – 100 Kinds of Life; Stanley Huang – We All Lay Down in the End; Jay Chou – Capricorn	
2010	A-Mei	Amit	Tanya Chua – If You See Him; Karen Mok – Hui Wei; Lala Hsu – Lala; Cheer Chen – Immortal	
2011	Jay Chou	The Era	Soft Lipa & Jabber Loop – Moonlight; Yao Hung – Flower Love; Karen Mok – Precious; William Wei – Wei Bird; Hebe Tien – To Hebe; Wang Leehom – The 18 Martial Arts	
2012	Mayday	Second Round	Yoga Lin – Perfect Life; Hebe Tien – My Love; Waa Wei – No Crying; Tanya Chua – Sing It Out of Love; Dwagie – People	
2013	Sandy Lam	Gaia	Jay Chou – Opus 12; MC HotDog – Ghetto Superstar; Khalil Fong – Back to Wonderland; Jolin Tsai – Muse	
2014	Chang Chen-yue	Ayal Komod	Li Ronghao – Model; Li Jian – Classic; Soft Lipa – Inside Trim; Emil Chau – Jiang Hu	
2015	Jolin Tsai	Play	Lala Hsu – Missing; Jacky Cheung – Wake Up Dreaming; Eason Chan – Rice & Shine; Jay Chou – Aiyo, Not Bad; Karen Mok – Departures	
2016	Sodagreen	Winter Endless	Peggy Hsu – Swing Inc.; Eli Hsieh – Progress Reports; A-Mei – Amit 2; Tanya Chua – Aphasia; PoeTek – Infinity	
2017	Mayday	History of Tomorrow	Khalil Fong – Journey to the West; Guo Ding – The Silent Star Stone; Eve Ai – Talk About Eve; Waa Wei – Run! Frantic Flowers!; Xu Jun – Feathers	
2018	Lala Hsu	The Inner Me	Leon Zheng – When I Leave Taipei; Eason Chan – C'mon In~; A-Mei – Story Thief; JJ Lin – Message in a Bottle; Dean Ting – The Journal	
2019	Shi Shi	Shi's Journey	Eli Hsieh - Where Are We Going?; Leo Wang - Wu Bing Singing, Yo Chin Soothing; Eve Ai - Fade to Exist; Jolin Tsai - Ugly Beauty; ØZI - ØZI: The Album; Sandy Lam - 0	
2020	Joanna Wang	Love is Calling Me	G.E.M. - City Zoo; Peggy Hsu - Hypnocity; Sandee Chan - Juvenile A; Waa Wei - Hidden, Not Forgotten; Wu Qing-feng - Spaceman	
2021	Soft Lipa	Home Cookin	Wanfang - Dear All; Shi Shi - Where is SHI?; Hebe Tien - Time Will Tell; WeiBird - Sounds of My Life; James Li - SHI RI TAN	
2022	Tanya Chua	Depart	Faye - Zai Yun Cai Shang Tiao Wu Ji Ji Zha Zha; Jerry Li - AI-CHING; Waa Wei - Have a Nice Day; Non-Physical Troupe (NPT) - Night Shift; Cui Jian - Fei Gou	
2023	Kumachan	PRO	Lala Hsu - Gei; Pei-yu Hung - Silver Lining; JADE - Snow White; Wu Qing-feng - Mallarme's Tuesdays; Hush - Pleasing Myself	
2024	No Party For Cao Dong	The Clod	Faith Yang - Flow; Xu Jun - OPEN IT; Fool and Idiot - Posture; Accusefive - In The Clouds; Jude Chiu - Jude Chiu	
2025	Trout Fresh	Good Sound with Attitudes	Khalil Fong - The Dreamer; J.Sheon - OUTCOMES; Terence Lam - Camouflage; Waa Wei - Ordeal by Pearls; Various artists (Note: Sandy Lam, Cyndi Wang, Cheer Chen, Hush, Pei-Yu Hung, Su Yunying, Huang Qishan, A-Lin, Sandee Chan, George Chen, Kuo Hung Tseng from Sunset Rollercoaster, Arai Soichiro, Ice Paper, JIHU, Kafe Hu, KST, Jade Chiu, Jiji Lee from Project Ace, James Lee, Qin Sifeng, Masa from Mayday, Von Citizen, Turing Music Laboratory, 3 Dogs(Xu Jun, Arai Soichiro, Sanbist Lin), Ivana Wong, Wang OK, Bernard Zheng, Zhou Yunpeng, Zhang Yuhan Leezi) - Imcomplete Rescure Mannual	
2026	Ayal Komod	Go With the Flow	Hong Pei-yu - Still Moving; MJ116 - OGS; Jolin Tsai - Pleasure; Jude Chiu - Leaving the Silver Waste Land; Shan Yichun - Lil Sis	

== Category facts ==
Most wins

Rank	1st
Artist	Mayday
Total wins	2 wins

Most nominations

Rank	1st	2nd	3rd
Artist	Tanya Chua; Jay Chou	A-Mei	Jolin Tsai; Karen Mok; Sodagreen
Total nominations	6 nominations	5 nominations	4 nominations
