= Hush (singer) =

HUSH
- Born: Chen Jia-wei; 15 January 1985 (age 40); Pingtung City, Taiwan
- Occupations: Singer; songwriter
- Years active: 2010–present

Chinese name
- Traditional Chinese: 陳品赫
Transcriptions
- Musical career
- Genres: Mandopop; rock
- Instruments: Voice, guitar, and piano
- Labels: re:public records

Chen Pin-he (Chinese: 陳品赫; born 15 January 1985), better known by his stage name HUSH, is a Taiwanese singer-songwriter.

He is formerly the vocalist of the Taiwanese band hush! He has worked with artists such as A-Lin, A-Mei, Lala Hsu and Stefanie Sun.

In 2021, he won Best Composer at the 32nd Golden Melody Awards for the song "AnHe" (安和). In 2022, he repeated the feat with "Shadow Song" (衣櫃歌手) at the 33rd Golden Melody Awards, becoming the second artist to win Best Composer for two consecutive years. In 2023, he won Best Male Mandarin Singer at the 34th Golden Melody Awards for his album Pleasing Myself (娛樂自己), becoming the first openly LGBT singer to win the award.

== Career ==
While at National Pingtung Senior High School, he was the lead singer of the pop music club. His interactions with the guitar club, which included future members of the band Mary See The Future (先知瑪莉), influenced him to learn guitar.

HUSH majored in philosophy at Fu Jen Catholic University.

In 2009, he signed with HIM International Music as a singer-songwriter, but he wasn't able to sell any songs. He also competed in the 3rd season of One Million Star, which was won by Lala Hsu, but he was eliminated before the top 100.

In 2010, while working part-time at the coffee shop Kafka by the Sea in Gongguan, he met drummer Bearpa and bassist Kabei. Together, they formed the band hush! Starting out acoustic, they transitioned into electric after playing many live shows. Usually, Hush records the demo and uploads to StreetVoice, a music-publishing platform for independent songwriters. His songs are inspired by his interests in astronomy, psychology, and tarot.

Within a year, they released an EP, Astronomical Cachet 『天文特徵』, and an album, X. Popular in the indie scene, the band performed at various events and venues in Xi'an, Shenzhen, Taipei, Hong Kong, and Kaohsiung.

After the band disbanded in 2014, HUSH started his solo career. His first single was produced by Mayday bassist Masa.

== Personal life ==
He has interests in astronomy and tarot. He is a supporter of same-sex marriage in Taiwan, expressing his views in his song Same (同一個答案). He came out during his concert on April 4, 2015. He's an avid participant of Taiwan Pride.

== Controversy ==
In 2015, the music video for his song King of Doubt (我想知道你的一切) was banned from television broadcast for nudity. Regarding the ban, HUSH felt that "it's good to open up a discussion about censorship and nudity," adding that "people can find it on the internet anyway." A VR version of the music video was also made.

== Discography ==
=== Releases ===
Type	Details
EP	First Person Trilogy 第一人稱三部曲: Released: March 20, 2015; Label: re: public records
Album	Monopoly 機會與命運: Released: October 30, 2015; Label: Sony Music
Album	In Other Words 換句話說: Released: September 21, 2018; Label: B'tween
Album	Pleasing Myself 娛樂自己: Released: December 15, 2022; Label: B'tween

=== Credits ===
Song title	Year	Contribution		Album	Singer	Notes
Song title	Year	Lyrics	Comp.	Album	Singer	Notes
Drizzle (毛毛雨)	2012	✓	✗	Home Girl 『關在家』	Sharon Kwan	
Kepler (克卜勒)	2014	✓	✓	Kepler 『克卜勒』	Stefanie Sun	
The Rain Is Still Dropping (雨還是不停地落下)	2014	✓	✗	Kepler 『克卜勒』	Stefanie Sun	
Missing (尋人啟事)	2014	✓	✗	Missing 『尋人啟事』	Lala Hsu	
Reveal (說破)	2014	✓	✗	Dare to Love 『敢愛敢當』	Della	
Hello (哈囉)	2014	✓	✗	With You 『在一起』	Amber An	
Kiss Temperature (吻的溫度)	2014	✓	✓	Love Temperature 『溫度』	FS	
I Deserve (我值得)	2014	✓	✗	Guilt 『罪惡感』	A-Lin	
Possessed (附身)	2015	✓	✓	Body Love 『以身試愛』	鄧子霆	
Freak Show (怪胎秀)	2015	✓	✗	Amit 2 『阿密特2』	Amit	
Gory Love Story (血腥愛情故事)	2015	✓	✗	Amit 2 『阿密特2』	Amit	
Stop Over There (前面路口停)	2015	✓	✗	Own Categories 『自成一派』	A-fu feat.Xiao Yu	
Bedtime Story (睡前故事)	2015	✓	✗	Mission Landing 『登陸計畫』	Silence Wong	
To Home (寫信回家)	2015	✓	✗	Wish You Well 『我要你好好的』	Rene Liu	
Wish You Well (我要你好好的)	2015	✓	✗	Wish You Well 『我要你好好的』	Rene Liu feat. Zhou Xun, Gwei Lun-mei, Tang Wei	lyrics revision
Be My Own Friend (當我的好朋友)	2016	✓	✗	Be My Own Friend 『當我的好朋友』	Della	
Get Your Move On (大動作)	2016	✓	✗	Be My Own Friend 『當我的好朋友』	Della	lyrics revision
Still Missing (還是想念)	2016	✓	✓	Still Missing 『還是想念』	家家	
Smooth Love (相愛無事)	2016	✓	✓	Still Missing 『還是想念』	家家	
Brighter Sky, Darker Night (天越亮，夜越黑)	2017	✓	✗	No. 13 – A Dancing Van Gogh 『跳舞的梵谷』	Stefanie Sun	
Happy Normal (平日快樂)	2017	✓	✗	No. 13 – A Dancing Van Gogh 『跳舞的梵谷』	Stefanie Sun	
Nothing is Missing (不缺)	2017	✓	✗	Nine Ways to Enjoy Loneliness 『九種使用孤獨的正確方式』	Michael	

=== Collaboration ===
Year released	Singer	Song title	Album
2015	Easy Shen	Afterdark (事後)	Anatta 『如果身體全部開放了』

== Awards and nominations ==
=== Golden Melody Awards ===
Year	Category	Nominated work	Result	Ref.
2015	Best Lyricist	"Missing" (Lala Hsu)	Nominated	
2021	Best Composer	"AnHe" (Tarcy Su)	Won	
2022	Best Composer	"Shadow Song"	Won	
2023	Album of the Year	Pleasing Myself	Nominated	
2023	Best Mandarin Album	Pleasing Myself	Nominated	
2023	Best Male Mandarin Singer	Pleasing Myself	Won	

=== Association of Musicians in Taiwan ===
Top ten singles
Year	Song title	Contribution		Singer	note
Year	Song title	Lyrics	Comp.	Singer	note
2014	Missing (尋人啟事)	Yes		Lala Hsu	
2014	Kepler (克卜勒)	Yes	Yes	Stefanie Sun	
