= Chang Yu-sheng =

Taiwanese musician and record producer

Chang Yu-sheng 張雨生

Background information
- Born: 7 June 1966; Magong, Penghu, Taiwan
- Died: 12 November 1997 (aged 31) Taipei, Taiwan
- Cause of death: Car accident
- Education: National Chengchi University (BA)
- Genres: Mandopop
- Occupations: Singer; songwriter; record producer
- Instruments: Vocals; guitar; keyboards
- Years active: 1988–1997
- Labels: UFO Record; Forward Music
- Website: www.yu-sheng.org

Chinese name
- Traditional Chinese: 張雨生
- Simplified Chinese: 张雨生
Transcriptions
Standard Mandarin
- Hanyu Pinyin: Zhāng Yǔshēng

Tom Chang Yu-sheng (7 June 1966 – 12 November 1997) was a Taiwanese pop vocalist, songwriter and record producer.

== Biography ==
Chang was born in Magong, Penghu, Taiwan, on 7 June 1966. His mother was Atayal and his father was a veteran of the ROC military. As the eldest child, he had two younger brothers and two younger sisters. He graduated from the National Chengchi University. In his spare time, he was keen on music, basketball, swimming, and reading.

He was known for his high vocals, capable of reaching notes up to D#6. His voice has been compared by some to Russell Hitchcock of Air Supply.

Chang died on 12 November 1997, at 31 years old, after being in a car accident on 20 October 1997.

== Career ==
Being influenced deeply by Western rock music, Chang had participated in two metal bands at university before he gained publicity with a beverage tie-in ballad "My Future isn't a Pipe Dream" in 1988.

In that year, Chang also released his debut album, Always Missing You, to success, selling 350 thousand records within the regions, before singing the soundtrack of a popular movie, Seven Wolves, starring him in one of the leading roles. After his graduation in 1989, he was nominated for "Best New Artist" at the Golden Melody Awards for his second album, Miss Me, with most songs co-written by himself.

He then developed his career as a singer-songwriter, attempting to introduce different genres of contemporary music to the general public despite ups and downs. With moderate to low commercial successes of his subsequent albums, Chang focused more on backstage roles, including music production and songwriting for theater performances.

He introduced Puyuma singer A-Mei, then a freelance pub singer, to his record label. Believing in her potential, Chang became A-Mei's vocal tutor, producer and supervisor.

Soon after producing her debut and second albums, which were released to a huge success in 1996 and 1997, he died at 31 years old. Renowned for his sopranist vocal range, significance to the development of the local music industry, and versatility, Chang is widely referred to as the "magician of music in Chinese" and is among the most prominent figures when it comes to Chinese language music, with most of his commercial failures later considered to be masterpieces.

== Discography ==
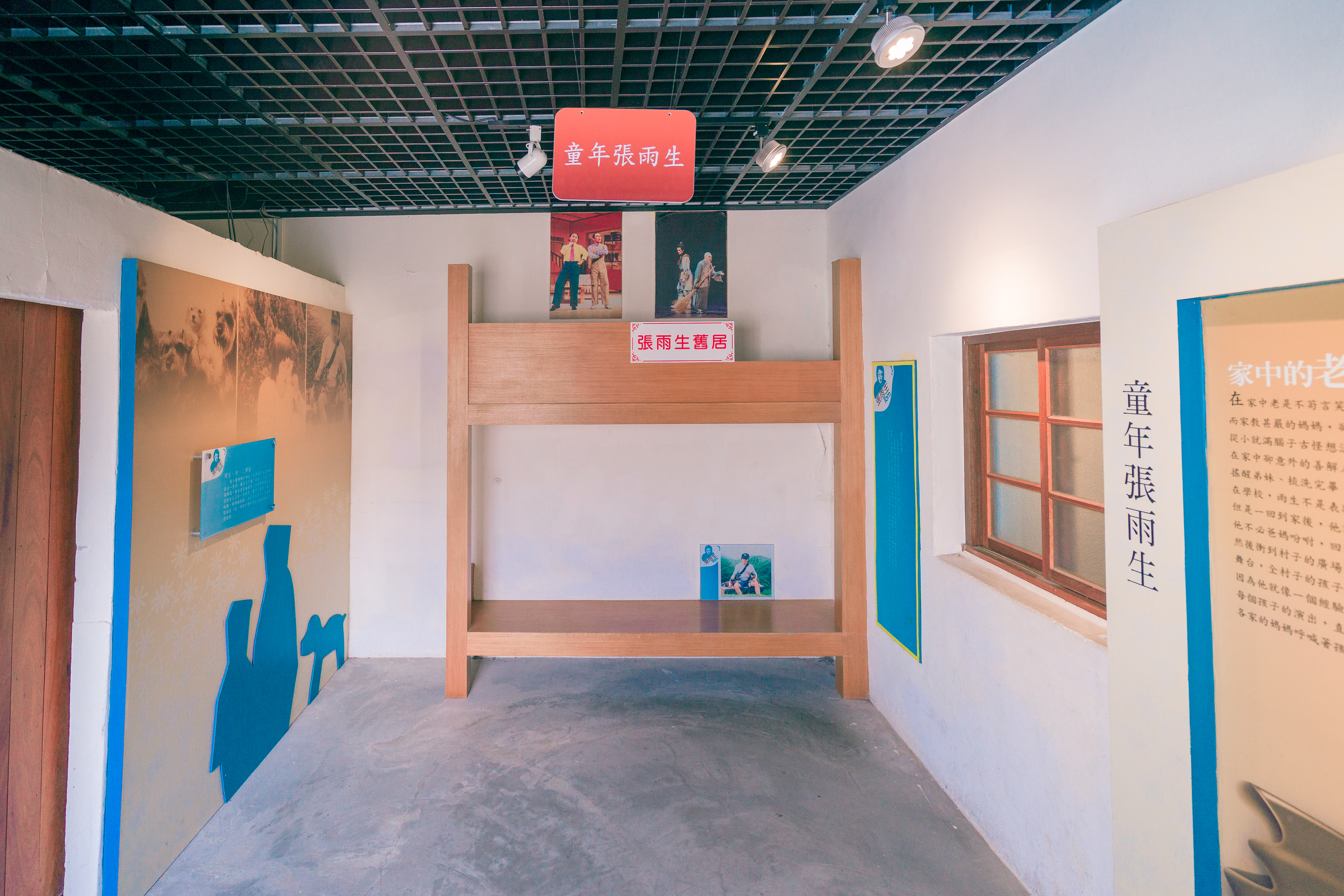
Chang Yu-sheng Memorial Museum in his hometown Penghu

Year	Album	Track listing
1 November 1988	天天想你	Track listing: 1. 跟著我; 2. 天天想你; 3. 永遠都像才認識; 4. 我的陽光我的風; 5. 渺小; 6. 和天一樣高; 7. 告訴我親愛的; 8. 沒有不可能的事; 9. 不是因為寂寞; 10. 就算為你也是為我
17 July 1989	想念我	Track listing: 1. 想念我; 2. 我不能一點一點愛你; 3. 無題; 4. 就為你; 5. 明天不會有淚; 6. 沒有煙抽的日子; 7. 當我正想要和你分享; 8. 他們; 9. 大地的天使; 10. 冒險少年
24 February 1992	带我去月球	Track listing: 1. 序曲; 2. 我想把整片天空打開; 3. 帶我去月球; 4. 無題; 5. 這一夜我睡不著; 6. 我就要轉彎; 7. 總髮遊; 8. 湖心草深長; 9. 魔幻台北; 10. 現在這樣; 11. 我呼吸我感覺我存在; 12. 我想把整片天空打開
30 November 1992	大海	Track listing: 1. 我是一棵秋天的樹; 2. I Don't Wanna Say Goodbye; 3. 多夢的歲月; 4. 愛上你的一切; 5. 掙扎; 6. 大海; 7. 寧可讓我苦; 8. 不管‧不管; 9. 把世界分一半給你; 10. 心底的中國
24 August 1993	一天到晚游泳的魚	Track listing: 1. 青澀的記憶; 2. 是否真的愛我; 3. 海的呼喚; 4. 一天到晚游泳的魚; 5. 冰點; 6. 妹妹晚安; 7. 祈求; 8. 一人一個夢; 9. 一步一徘徊; 10. 仲夏夜之夢; 11. 勿忘我; 12. 靜夜星空; 13. 三月的天真; 14. 無知的歲月
5 September 1994	卡拉OK‧台北‧我	Track listing: 1. 我是多麼想; 2. 動物的悲歌; 3. 靈光; 4. 永公街的街長; 5. 子夜抒懷; 6. 兄弟呀; 7. 這一年這一夜; 8. 我的心在發燙; 9. 後知後覺; 10. 蝴蝶結; 11. 跟得上我吧; 12. 我期待; 13. 再見 蘭花草！
27 March 1995	還是朋友	Track listing: 1. 還是朋友; 2. 西風的話; 3. 不想失去你; 4. 我是風箏; 5. 永遠的自由; 6. 執著; 7. 我什麼都願意給; 8. 一生陪你走; 9. 愛做夢的孩子; 10. 別放棄希望
12 July 1996	兩伊戰爭﹣紅色熱情 (EP)	Track listing: 1. 最愛的人傷我最深; 2. 費盡心思; 3. The Indian Summer Night; 4. 不亮的燈
14 July 1996	兩伊戰爭-白色才情 (EP)	Track listing: 1. 未知; 2. 再見女郎; 3. 後窗; 4. 發暈; 5. 沈默之沙
14 October 1997	口是心非	Track listing: 1. 如果你要離開我; 2. 口是心非; 3. CAPPUCCINO; 4. 玫瑰的名字; 5. 河 6. 愛情‧‧‧; 7. ‧‧‧的圖案; 8. 隨你; 9. 神采; 10. 在黃昏融化了世界的色彩以前; 11. 若我告訴你其實我愛的只是你

== Awards and nominations ==
Year	Award	Category	Nominated work	Result
1990	1st Golden Melody Awards	Best New Artist	—N/a	Nominated
1990	2nd Golden Melody Awards	Best Male Vocalist – Mandarin	Miss Me	Nominated
1992	4th Golden Melody Awards	Best Music Video	"Take Me to the Moon"	Nominated
1993	5th Golden Melody Awards	Best Male Vocalist – Mandarin	—N/a	Nominated
1996	7th Golden Melody Awards	Song of the Year	"Still Friends"	Nominated
1998	9th Golden Melody Awards	Album of the Year	Duplicity	Won
1998	9th Golden Melody Awards	Best Lyricist	"River"	Nominated
2017	28th Golden Melody Awards	Special Contribution Award	—N/a	Honored
