= Xiao Yu (singer) =

- 宋念宇
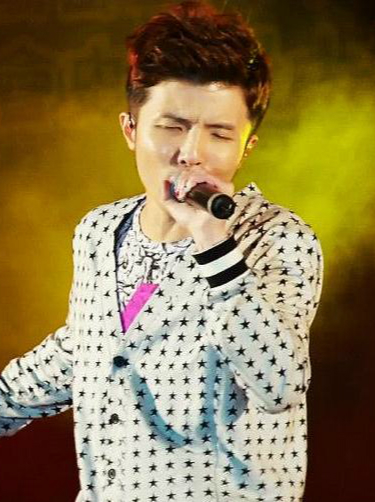
- Xiao in 2012
- Pronunciation: Sung Nien-yu
- Born: Sung Hsiang-feng (宋庠鋒); 22 November 1983 (age 42); Zhongli, Taoyuan, Taiwan
- Education: Taoyuan Innovation Institute of Technology
- Occupations: Singer; songwriter; record producer
- Years active: 2003–present
- Musical career
- Genres: Mandopop, R&B
- Instruments: Vocals; piano; keyboard; guitar
- Label: Warner Music

Sung Nien-yu (Chinese: 宋念宇; pinyin: Sòng Niànyǔ; born 22 November 1983), better known by his stage name Xiao Yu (Chinese: 小宇; pinyin: Xiǎo yǔ), is a Taiwanese singer, songwriter, and record producer.

== Career ==
Most of Xiao's early career was spent behind the scenes, writing and producing music for numerous Mandarin singers. He released his debut album Classmate Xiao Yu That's Me in 2008 which garnered widespread acclaim. This was followed up with the 2009 release of the album Standing Here where the album spent 21 consecutive weeks in the G-Music top 20 album sales chart. In 2013, he received a nomination for Best Mandarin Male Singer at the 24th Golden Melody Awards for One More Time. After a five-year break from music due to military service and going through restructure of his previous record company, Xiao returned with his fourth studio album in 2017, With You, his first release under Warner Music Taiwan.

== Discography ==
=== Studio albums ===
#	English title	Chinese title	Release date	Track listing	Label
1st	Classmate Xiao Yu That's Me	小宇同學就是我	9 January 2008	Track listing: 1. 痴妹與王兩 (Chī mèi yǔ wáng liǎng); 2. 沒那麼難 (Méi nà me nán); 3. 沒有很會唱 (Méi yǒu hěn huì chàng); 4. 寂寞射手 (Jì mò shè shǒu); 5. 終於說出口 (Zhōng yū shuō chū kǒu); 6. 就是說不出口 (Jiù shì shuō bu chū kǒu); 7. I Can't Stop; 8. 捨不得 (Shě bu de); 9. 我在角落觀察ABC (Wǒ zài jiǎo luò guān chá ABC); 10. 偶霉敢結 (Ǒu méi gǎn jié); 11. 唯一的唯一 (Wéi yī de wéi yī); 12. 喔原來是這樣 (Ō yuán lái shì zhè yàng); 13. 還簡單得多 (Hái jiǎn dān de duō)	Avex Taiwan
2nd	Standing Here	就站在這裡	9 June 2009	Track listing: 1. 又! (Yòu!); 2. 就站在這裡 (Jiù zhàn zài zhè lǐ); 3. 練愛 (Liàn ài); 4. 愛上 (Ài shàng); 5. 你很好 (Nǐ hěn hǎo); 6. 說分手之後 (Shuō fēn shǒu zhī hòu); 7. 一顆蘋果 (Yī kē píng guǒ); 8. 漂亮女孩 (Piào liang nǚ hái); 9. Every Time; 10. 換換換 (Huàn huàn huàn); 11. Why	Avex Taiwan
3rd	One More Time	再一次	7 December 2012	Track listing: 1. Fight; 2. 海 (Hǎi); 3. 再一次 (Zài yī cì); 4. 幻聽 (Huàn tīng); 5. 舊朋友 (Jiù péng yǒu); 6. 分别 (Fēn bié); 7. 這幾天 (Zhè jǐ tiān); 8. 一個光年的距離 (Yī gè guāng nián de jù lí); 9. 過渡期 (Guò dù qī); 10. 你說敢不敢 (Nǐ shuō gǎn bù gǎn)	Avex Taiwan
4th	With You	同在	7 April 2017	Track listing: 1. 同在 With You; 2. 慣性取暖 Habitual Love; 3. 原來的你 Original You; 4. 不好過 It Ain't Easy; 5. 這樣好不好 How About This?; 6. 所謂的愛 So Called Love; 7. 給我你的壞 Give Me Your Bad; 8. 理想時代 Ideal World; 9. 被愛妄想 Delusional Love; 10. 我呢 What About Me; 11. Outro 我們...能回到原來的樣子嗎? Can We Return To How We Were?	Warner Music Taiwan
5th	Be Nothing	無視	15 December 2021	Track listing: 1. 見好就放 Schizophrenia; 2. 等妳想起我 If You Forget Me; 3. 年少不平凡 Young And Frivolous; 4. 怎麼忘記了你 Gone; 5. 不與誰做對的誠實 A Time To Be Silent; 6. 沒什麼不好 Time Will Tell; 7. 我知道你會哭 Don't Cry; 8. 多了多了 Not Enough; 9. 無視生非 Nothing To See; 10. 你走吧 Stay; 11. 默念你 Murmur; 12. 臉 Beautiful Face	Warner Music Taiwan

=== Singles ===
Title	Release date	Track listing	Label	Notes	
"One & Only" Chinese: 唯一的唯一; pinyin: Wéi yī de wéi yī	May 2007	"One & Only" Chinese: 唯一的唯一; pinyin: Wéi yī de wéi yī	Avex Taiwan	data-sort-value="" style="vertical-align:middle; text-align:center" class="table-na" | —	
"2020 Where Are You?" (Chinese: 2020你在哪裡; pinyin: 2020 Nǐ zài nǎ lǐ)	2020你在哪裡	20 July 2010	"2020 Where Are You?" (Chinese: 2020你在哪裡; pinyin: 2020 Nǐ zài nǎ lǐ)	data-sort-value="" style="vertical-align:middle; text-align:center" class="table-na" | —	Take One Music
"The Power of Beauty" (Chinese: 美麗的力量; pinyin: Měi lì de lì liàng)	24 February 2011	"The Power of Beauty" (Chinese: 美麗的力量; pinyin: Měi lì de lì liàng)	Take One Music	data-sort-value="" style="vertical-align:middle; text-align:center" class="table-na" | —	
"Own Categories" (自成一派)	19 June 2015	"Stop at the Intersection" (前面路口停)	Forward Music	data-sort-value="" style="vertical-align:middle; text-align:center" class="table-na" | —	
"An Angel's Secret" (feat. Erika)	當一個天使的憂愁（feat. Erika）	12 May 2016	"An Angel's Secret"	data-sort-value="" style="vertical-align:middle; text-align:center" class="table-na" | —	Magpie Entertainment
"I Don't Believe in Faith" (不信邪; feat. Jam Hsiao)	2 December 2016	"I Don't Believe in Faith" (不信邪; feat. Jam Hsiao)	Magpie Entertainment	data-sort-value="" style="background: var(--background-color-interactive, #ececec); color: var(--color-base, inherit); vertical-align: middle; text-align: center; " class="table-na" | Non-album single	
"Murmur" (默念你)	24 December 2019	"Murmur" (默念你)	Magpie Entertainment, Warner Music Taiwan	data-sort-value="" style="background: var(--background-color-interactive, #ececec); color: var(--color-base, inherit); vertical-align: middle; text-align: center; " class="table-na" | Non-album single	
"Beautiful Face" 臉)	17 April 2020	Magpie Entertainment		data-sort-value="" style="background: var(--background-color-interactive, #ececec); color: var(--color-base, inherit); vertical-align: middle; text-align: center; " class="table-na" | Non-album single	

=== Soundtrack album ===
Title	Release date	Track listing	Label
Ex-Boyfriend Original TV Soundtrack (前男友電視原聲帶)	19 January 2012	1. "I've Always Loved You" Chinese: 一直都愛著你; pinyin: Yī zhí dōu ài zhe nǐ); 2. "This Girl" (Chinese: 這個女孩; pinyin: Zhè ge nǚ hái 3. 一直都愛著你 (Yī zhí dōu ài zhe nǐ); 4. 一直都愛著你 - instrumental (Yī zhí dōu ài zhe nǐ); 5. 最後只能說再見|Zuì hòu zhǐ néng shuō zài jiàn 6. 遇上了你 (Yù shàng le nǐ); 7. Every Time You Smile; 8. 我們說好了 (Wǒ men shuō hǎo le); 9. 一直都愛著你 - 在家練唱版 (Yī zhí dōu ài zhe nǐ); 10. 最後只能說再見 - 在家練唱版 (Zuì hòu zhǐ néng shuō zài jiàn); 11. 我們說好了 - 在家練唱版 (Wǒ men shuō hǎo le)	Avex Taiwan
The Wolf Original Television Series Soundtrack (狼殿下影視原聲帶)	24 December 2020	1. 天狼星 Sirius	Warner Music Taiwan

== Awards and nominations ==
Year	Award	Category	Nominated work	Result	Ref.
2008	Chinese Musicians Exchange Association	Top Ten Albums of the Year	Classmate Xiao Yu That's Me	Won	
2012	Chinese Musicians Exchange Association	Top Ten Albums of the Year	One More Time	Won	
2013	24th Golden Melody Awards	Best Mandarin Male Singer	One More Time	Nominated	
2013	Metro Radio Mandarin Hits Music Awards	Songs of the Year	"One Light Years' Distance"	Won	
2013	Metro Radio Mandarin Hits Music Awards	Best New Artist	—N/a	Won	
2018	29th Golden Melody Awards	Best Male Mandarin Singer	With You	Nominated	
2020	31st Golden Melody Awards	Producer of the Year — Single	"Murmur"	Nominated	
2022	2022 Hito Music Awards	Hit FM's Favourite Artist	Be Nothing	Won	
2022	2022 Hito Music Awards	Hito Best Music Arrangement	"Gone" (怎麼忘記了你)	Won	
2022	33rd Golden Melody Awards	Best Composition	"If You Forget Me" (等妳想起我)	Nominated	
