= 35th Golden Melody Awards =

Taiwan music awards ceremony in 2024

- Date: June 29, 2024 (Popular music)
- Venue: Taipei Arena (Popular music)
- Hosted by: Lulu Huang
- Most awards: The Clod – No Party For Cao Dong (3)
- Most nominations: Faith Yang (8)
- Website: gma.tavis.tw/gm35/index.htm

Television/radio coverage
- Network: TTV

The 35th Golden Melody Awards (Chinese: 第35屆金曲獎) took place in Taipei Arena, Taipei, Taiwan in 2024. The award ceremony for the popular music categories was hosted by Lulu Huang and broadcast on TTV on 29th June 2024.

Faith Yang received the most nominations with 8 for her eighth recording studio album Flow, receiving nods from the jury for Album of the Year, Best Mandarin Album, Best Female Mandarin Singer, Best Vocal Recording Album among others.

Shi Shi (孙盛希) won her first Female Mandarin Singer award on her third nomination in the category, beating Faith Yang, while MC HotDog claimed Best Male Mandarin Singer, edging out Jude Chiu, a third-time nominee and JJ Lin, who released his 20th anniversary album in 2023.

The biggest winner of the night was No Party for Cao Dong, who won Album of the Year, Best Mandarin Album and Best Band for their second studio album, The Clod.

== Winners and Nominees ==
Below is the list of winners and nominees:

Vocal category – Record label awards
Album of the Year	Song of the Year
The Clod – No Party for Cao Dong; Flow – Faith Yang; OPEN IT – Xu Jun; Posture – Fool and Idiot; In The Clouds – Accusefive; Jude Chiu – Jude Chiu; kán-tan tsi̍t kù uē – Tēnn Pîng; Hái-hái Jîn-sing – Aoi; Human Condition – Fire EX.; Iā-Pô – Panai; Carry On – Meilinbear; Jinsei Daigaku – Henry Hsu; A Dragonfly Reads a Poem – Rita Lin; Migration – Leaf Yeh; Shape of Life – Shu-Chan Chiu; Zhin' Moi – Zoomie; Hakka Glory – Boiii P; PAMERICAH – AZ Lixiaozu・Mayaw Alang; A Letter To Happiness – Li-Ting Chiu, Sapa Truku Children's Choir; Vusam – Utjung Tjakivalid; Those Days – O-Kai Singers; Treasure – Makav; Women's Island – Ado' Kaliting Pacidal; World – Elephant Gym; You'll Forever Live In My Song – Paige Su	"We Will Be Fine" (from In The Clouds) – Accusfive; "Sabotage feat. Buddha Jump" (from Flow) – Faith Yang; "Solo Dance at Midnight" (from Human Condition) – Fire EX.; "Damn" (from The Clod) – No Party for Cao Dong; "The Landlord Upstairs (from Disguseted Performed By)" – MC Hotdog; "Tristesse" (from Tristesse) – A-Mei
Best Mandarin Album	Best Taiwanese Album
The Clod – No Party for Cao Dong; Flow – Faith Yang; OPEN IT – Xu Jun; Posture – Fool and Idiot; In The Clouds – Accusefive; Jude Chiu – Jude Chiu	lā-Pô – Panai; kán-tan tsi̍t kù uē – Tēnn Pîng; Hái-hái Jîn-sing – Aoi; Human Condition – Fire EX.; Carry On – Meilinbear; Jinsei Daigaku – Henry Hsu
Best Hakka Album	Best Indigenous Language Album
Shape of Life – Shu-Chan Chiu; A Dragonfly Reads a Poem – Rita Lin; Migration – Leaf Yeh; Zhin' Moi – Zoomie; Hakka Glory – Boiii P	Treasure – Makav; PAMERICAH – AZ Lixiaozu・Mayaw Alang; A Letter To Happiness – Li-Ting Chiu, Sapa Truku Children's Choir; Vusam – Utjung Tjakivalid; Those Days – O-Kai Singers; Women's Island – Ado' Kaliting Pacidal
Best Music Video	
Don't Mind Me (from CHIN UP!) – Director: Mark Bong; delulu (from delulu) – Director: Jeremy Z. Qin; Tokyo Calling (from Tokyo Calling) – Director: Pennaky; Bon Bon (from SweetBox) – Director: Yin Chen-Hao; GOOD LOOKING (from GOOD LOOKING) – Director: Jeremy Z. Qin; Ho(l)e (from Way out) – Director: Haoyan of America; Runner Runner (from RISE) – Director: Martin Tan	
Vocal category – Individual awards
Best Composition	Best Lyrics
"Moments" (from OPEN IT) – Xu Jun (Performer: Xu Jun); "Dust and Ashes" (from Happily, Painfully After) – JJ Lin (Performer: JJ Lin); "Damn" (from The Clod) – No Party For Cao Dong (Performer: No Party For Cao Dong); "The Adults" (from The Wonder of Wondering Life – Eric Chou (Performer: Fish Leong); "Tristesse" (from Tristesse) – Kay Huang (Performer: A-Mei); "Someday, Somewhere" (from Someday, Somewhere) – Jolin Tsai, Richard Craker (Performer: Jolin Tsai)	"The Landlord Upstairs" (from Disgusted Performed By) – MC Hotdog (Performer: MC Hotdog); "Getting old" (from Getting old) – Bu-Hiong (Performer: Michael Shih); "Devil In My Hat" (from Seven) – Katie Lee (Performer: Rhydian Vaughan); "Down Lies The Skeleton" (from Jude Chiu) – David Ke (Performer: Jude Chiu); "The Adults" (from The Wonder of Wandering Life) – Daryl Yao (Performer: Fish Leong); "Farewell of the Fall" (from Carry On) – Yang Su-Hao, Ding Jin, Eric Lin (Performer: Melinbear)
Best Music Arrangement	Best Album Producer
"OPEN IT" (from OPEN IT) – Xu Jun (Performer: Xu Jun); "A Dream Of Bonnie And Clyde feat. JADE" (from Flow) – dooodooo (Performer: Faith Yang); "Adica" (from Adica) – OZI, Ian Jeffrey Thomas, Kyle Lu, Chia-Chen Chang (Performer: OZI); "Damn" (from The Clod) – No Party For Cao Dong (Performer: No Party For Cao Dong); "Embryo" (from Jude Chiu) – Jude Chiu, Walter Kwan, Tsui Chin-Hung (Performer: Sandee Chen); "Circle" (from Circle) – Huang Shao-Yong, Wang Wang Yun-Chu (Performer: Su Yun-Ying)	Flow – Howe Chen (Performer: Faith Yang); kán-tan tsi̍t kù uē – Huang Hao-Lun, Tēnn Pîng (Performer: Tēnn Pîng); OPEN IT – Araiz (Performer: Xu Jun); Seven – HLK (Performer: Rhydian Vaughan); Shape of Life – Shuo Hsiao (Performer: Shu-Chan Chiu); Treasure – Huang Shao-Yong, ABAO (Performer: Makav)
Best Song Producer	Best New Artist
"A Walk To Remember" (from A Road To Remember) – Ryota Katayama, Wen Hung (Performer: Ryota Katayama); "Gaslight" (from Not So Far Away) – W.LIN, I-Tun Chou (Performer: Marz23, OZI); "Henshin" (from Tshut Tsit Ki Tshui) – Chen Chien-Wei (Performer: Shao Da-Lun); "Tristesse" (from Tristesse) – Kay Huang (Performer: A-Mei); "UMAMI" (from UMAMI) – The Crane, SIRUP, whoosh (Performer: The Crane, SIRUP); "He Already Has Someone (2023)" (from He Already Has Someone (2023) ) – ZERO, Matt Hsu (Performer: Henry Hsu, Flesh Juicer); "Thank God We Survived" (from Thank God We Survived) – Kumachan, rgry (Performer: Kumachan, SOWUT & BR)	Treasure – Makav; kán-tan tsi̍t kù uē – Tēnn Pîng; Loose Faucet – Hogan T.; Be A Lover – ADEN Wang; Survive To Remember – Vash Hsu; Seven – Rhydian Vaughan; Jocelyn 9.4.0 – Jocelyn 9.4.0
Best Male Mandarin Singer	Best Female Mandarin Singer
Disgusted Performed By – MC Hotdog; OPEN IT – Xu Jun; Painfully, Happily After – JJ Lin; Not So Far Away – Marz23; Jude Chiu – Jude Chiu	Boomerang – Shi Shi; Flow – Faith Yang; Sent – 9m88; Circle – Su Yunying; Allure – Tia Ray
Best Male Singer (Taiwanese)	Best Female Singer (Taiwanese)
Empty side of the heart – Justin Su; daomadan – Weng Li-you; kán-tan tsi̍t kù uē – Tēnn Pîng; The Best Year – Sean Lin; Jinsei Daigaku – Henry Hsu	Eighteen Martial Arts – Huang Fei; Iā-Pô – Panai; Carry On – Meilinbear; Sleeptalking – Joey Chiang; The Secret – Kelly Tsai
Best Singer (Indigenous Language)	Best Singer (Hakka)
The Beauty of Pangcah – Usay Kawlu; Vusam – Utjung Tjakivalid; The Answers: Ngerenger Darusakiv and Friends – Ngerenger Darusakiv and Friends; The World Is Dancing With Me – Yaway·Mawring; Treasure – Makav	Zhin' Moi – Zoomie; A Dragonfly Reads a Poem – Rita Lin; Migration – Leaf Yeh; Shape of Life – Shu-Chan Chiu; Chill Huang – Lulu Lin
Best Band	Best Vocal Group
The Clod – No Party For Cao Dong; Human Condition – Fire EX.; Beautiful World – The Loophole; Posture – Fool And Idiot; In The Clouds – Accusefive; World – Elephant Gym; What A Romance – MIXER	Those Days – O-Kai Singers; Hái-hái Jîn-sing – Aoi; Chubby! Chubby! – The Wanted; WHO CARES – SmashRegz; Natural Phenomena – Limi
Instrumental category – Record label awards
Best Instrumental Album	
Wonderful One – QinQinQin, JJ, Dakanow, Huang Wei, Riga Huang, Unid Huang, Hu Zhe-Ray, Cao Chang-Xuan, Grace Lu; Built In System – Jeremy Pelt, Richie Goods, Allan Mednard, Chien-Chien Lu; a method for capsaicinoid analysis – dongyi; Chen Mingchang's 2023 Soundtrack Trilogy – Chen Mingchang; Wuchang Ding – Liu Pi, Szx.	
Instrumental category – Individual awards
Best Instrumental Album Producer	Best Instrumental Composer
at one – Chia-Lun Yue, T.R. Lai	"High-Tech Pros and Cons" (from Liberated Gesture) – Yu-Han Su
Technical category – Individual awards
Best Album Design	
Flow – Wu Jian-Long; Hái-hái Jîn-sing – Cheng Li-Hua; Posture – Lu Yi-Xuan; Empty side of the heart – Lu Yi-Xuan, Huang Jia-Hong; Almost Human – Liu Yueh-Yueh	
Technical category – Record label awards
Best Album Recording	Best Instrumental Album Recording
Posture – (Recording Engineers：Minstrel Lu／Main Mixing Engineers：Minstrel Lu, Guanru Zhou／Main Mastering Post-Production：Minstrel Lu); Flow – (Recording Engineers：Chou-Han Tsay, SHENB, Chief, Brent Clark, Zen Chien, Yu-Hsuan Yeh／Main Mixing Engineers：Ziya Huang, Howe, Caesar Edmunds／Main Mastering Post-Production：Matt Colton); OPEN IT – (Recording Engineers：Sanbist Lin, Aydos／Main Mixing Engineers：Sanbist Lin, Zhao Jing BIG.J／Main Mastering Post-Production：3 Dogs, San-Geun Jeon); Jude Chiu – (Recording Engineers：Yuri Red, Shao Tian, Tong X, Zhang Yu-Han, Meng Tao, Li Yang／Main Mixing Engineers：Matthew Sim／Main Mastering Post-Production：Alex Psaroudakis); Sent – (Recording Engineers：Chou-Han Tsay, Tzu-Ting Yang, Eric Chen, Kai-Yuan Cheng／Main Mixing Engineers：Chou-Han Tsay, Shan Wei-Ming／Main Mastering Post-Production：Stuart Hawkes)	Pluto Potato - Chou-Han Tsai／Main Mixing Engineers：Howe、Chou-Han Tsai、Jay Cheng／Main Mastering Post-Production：Alex Gordon); Built In System – (Chou-Han Tsai／Main Mixing Engineers：Howe、Chou-Han Tsai、Jay Cheng／Main Mastering Post-Production：Alex Gordon); Exploitation Suite – (Michael Perez Cisneros, Kevin Thomas ／Main Mixing Engineers：Michael Perez Cisneros／Main Mastering Post-Production：Michael Perez Cisneros); Hello Ghost! (Original Motion Picture Soundtrack) – (Recording Engineers：Chou-Han Tsay、Shao-Ting Sun／Main Mixing Engineers：Chou-Han Tsay／Main Mastering Post-Production：Robert Kleiner); Ghost Of The Dark Path Soundtrack – (Recording Engineers：Yu-Hsuan Yeh／Main Mixing Engineers：Yu-Hsuan Yeh／Main Mastering Post-Production：Yu-Hsuan Yeh)
Special Contribution Award
Liu Ching-chih	Cheng Hwa-jiuan
Jury Award
World – Elephant Gym
