= Johnny Yin =

- 殷正洋
- Born: 23 January 1961 (age 65); Taipei, Taiwan
- Education: Department of Physics, National Central University
- Occupations: Singer, host
- Years active: 1986-present
- Spouse: Li Wenyuan (m. 1986)
- Musical career
- Also known as: Three Gold Singer (三金歌王)
- Genres: Taiwanese Campus Folk; Mandopop
- Instrument: Vocals
- Labels: Sunrise Records; Elite Music; BMG Music Taiwan

Chinese name
- Traditional Chinese: 殷正洋
- Simplified Chinese: 殷正洋
Transcriptions
Standard Mandarin
- Hanyu Pinyin: Yīn Zhèngyáng

Johnny Yin Cheng-yang (Chinese: 殷正洋; pinyin: Yīn Zhèngyáng; Wade–Giles: Yin Cheng-yang; born 23 January 1961) is a Taiwanese singer and host. Born in Taipei, Taiwan, Yin has won three Golden Melody Awards for Best Male Mandarin Singer. He has also won the Golden Tripod and two Golden Bell Awards, earning him the name "Three Gold Singer". Yin is known for his thick and stentorian singing voice.

== Life and career ==
Yin was born on 23 January 1961. His ancestral home is Hanyang County, Hubei (now Hanyang District, Wuhan).

In 1986, he published his first album, "Misty Regrets" (雨中的歉意). In 1990, he won the 1st Golden Melody Award for Best Male Singer. Yin would later win the 5th and 6th Golden Melody Awards, holding a record for most times a male singer has won the award until Eason Chan tied it in 2018.

== Personal life ==
Yin is currently a co-host with his wife, Li Wenyuan, for Da AI TV programs "Yin-Yuan and Friends" (殷瑗小聚) and "Music has Love" (音樂有愛).

== Discography ==
List of Albums
Name	Mandarin	Year
Misty Regrets	雨中的歉意	1986
Please Look Back	請你回眸	1986
Life Notes	生活扎記	1987
World's Clock	世界的鐘	1988
Folk Songs Quotations	民歌語錄	1989
Message from Time and Space	時空寄語	1989
Life is a Surging Song	生命是一首澎湃的歌	1990
Variable	變數	1992
The Sky Is Blue	天空藍藍的	1993
Opera	戲歌	1994
Waiting for Someone	等一個人	1994
Opera 2	戲歌2	1995
How Much Should I Devote to You	該給你多少	1996
The Moon Shines in the Red Dust	明月照紅塵	2005
Like a Lotus Wish	如蓮心願	2006
Sound in Bodhi	聲在菩提中	2007

== Awards and nominations ==
Year	Session	Nominated work	Award	Result
1988	23rd Golden Bell Awards	《飛揚的音符－殷正洋專輯》	Male Singer Award	Won
1990	1st Golden Melody Awards	Folk Songs Quotations	Best Male Mandarin Singer	Won
1993	5th Golden Melody Awards	The Sky Is Blue	Best Male Mandarin Singer	Won
1994	6th Golden Melody Awards	Opera	Best Male Mandarin Singer	Won
1994	Golden Tripod	The Sky Is Blue	Male Singer of the Year	Won
2007	42nd Golden Bell Awards	Music Has Love	Singing variety show host award	Nominated
