= Chang Fu-hsing (musician) =

Taiwanese musician

- Chang in the late 1930s
- Born: 1 February 1888; Zhunan, Miaoli, Taiwan
- Died: 5 March 1954 (aged 66); Taipei, Taiwan
- Occupations: Vionlinist; Musical educator
- Known for: Indigenous music survey

Chang Fu-hsing (traditional Chinese: 張福興; simplified Chinese: 张福兴; pinyin: Zhāng Fúxìng, 1 February 1888 – 3 March 1954) was a Taiwanese violinist and musical educator who trained numerous musicians in Taiwan and known for the first to survey indigenous music of Taiwan.

== Biography ==
Born in Toufen, Miaoli County, Chang studied in the Toufen Public Elementary School and later Taiwan Governor-General's National Language School, graduating in 1907. A year later, he was nominated to study in the Tokyo Music School to learn pipe organ which was not yet introduced to Taiwan at that time, becoming the first Taiwan music student to study in Japan. Chang also took violin lessons in his final year of study. Chang's advisor was Akatarō Shimazaki. His classmates included the composer Kiyoshi Nobutoki and the cellist Hagiwara Eiichi.

After returning to Taiwan in 1910, Chang settled in Taihoku (today Taipei), and began teaching at his alma mater and also taught part-time at Taihoku Second Middle School. He trained numerous local musicians, and in 1920 he founded the Ling Long Hui Orchestra, which gave public concerts from time to time.

Chang was also interested in Taiwan's indigenous music and was the first Taiwanese musician to collate a record of the songs. He traveled to Sun Moon Lake in the spring of 1922 to survey the indigenous music under the invitation of the colonial government, and published his record 水社化番杵の音と歌謠 in December that year, making it the first book on this field of musical study.

After the Japanese colonial period ended in 1945, Chang continued his work as a music educator. He was a professor at the Department of Music of Taiwan Provincial Normal College and an editor of music textbooks for elementary schools. Chang also worked on collecting Buddhist music after his retirement and until his death in 1954.
