= Angus Tung =

- Born: 26 July 1959 (age 67); Kaohsiung, Taiwan
- Occupations: Singer, songwriter, record producer
- Years active: 1983–present
- Musical career
- Also known as: Angus Tong, Tong An Ge
- Origin: Canada
- Genres: Mandopop

Angus Tung (Chinese: 童安格; pinyin: Tóng Āngé; born 26 July 1959) is a Taiwanese pop musician. He was active as a singer-songwriter and record producer from the mid-1980s to mid-1990s. Known for his boyish good looks and talent, Angus Tung debuted in 1983 and released his first solo album "Miss You" (想你) two years later. He subsequently released 14 albums, including a Chinese pop classic "But You Don't Understand My Heart" (其实你不懂我的心). To date, he has won numerous musical and popularity awards such as "Best Male Vocalist" and "Top Ten Most Popular Artiste in China". In recent years, despite being more active with drama serials and radio hosting in China, Tung continues to compose and sing songs.

== Discography ==
- 想妳 (1985)
- 女人 (1986)
- 我曾經愛過 (1986)
- 跟我來 (1987)
- 其實你不懂我的心 (1989)
- 夢開始的地方 (1989)
- 花瓣雨 (1990)
- 真愛是誰 (1990)
- 一世情緣 (1991)
- 愛與哀愁 (1992)
- 現在以後 (1994)
- 聽海的歌 (1995)
- 看未來有甚麼不一樣 (1995)
- 收留 (1996)
- 青春手卷 (2003)
