= 1st Golden Melody Awards =

1990 Taiwanese music awards ceremony

- Date: 6 January 1990
- Location: Sun Yat-sen Memorial Hall, Taipei, Taiwan
- Hosted by: Louise Tsuei

Television/radio coverage
- Network: CTS

The 1st Golden Melody Awards ceremony (Chinese: 第一屆金曲獎) was held at the Sun Yat-sen Memorial Hall in Taipei on 6 January 1990.

== Winners ==
Song of the Year	Best Lyricist
"I Want A Home" – Pan Mei-chen	"Threads of Love" – Chang Ching-chou
Best Composer	Best Arrangement
"About the Past" – Cheng Chen-ming	"Love to the High" – Chen Yang
Best Music Video	Best Music Video Director
"The Story Of Youngest"	"The Story Of Youngest" – Chang Ta-lung
Best Male Vocalist	Best Female Vocalist
Johnny Yin	Jody Chiang
Best Vocal Collaboration	Best New Artist
Zhi Ji Er Chong Chang	Sky Wu
Special Contribution Award	
Chen Ta-ju; Zhuang Nu	
