= Hsiao Huang-chi =

Taiwanese singer (born 1976)

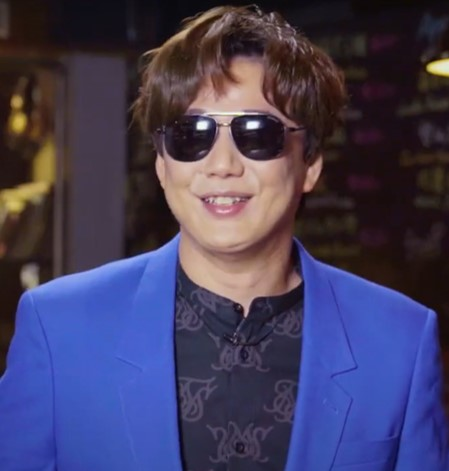
- Hsiao attending an interview by Elle Taiwan on 1 June 2021.
- Born: 22 September 1976 (age 49); Banqiao, Taipei County, Taiwan
- Occupations: Singer; songwriter; judoka; therapeutic masseuse
- Years active: 2000–present
- Musical career
- Also known as: Ricky Hsiao; Xiao Huangqi
- Genres: Mandopop; Taiwanese Hokkien pop
- Instruments: Vocals; guitar; saxophone; drums
- Label: Universal Music Taiwan

Chinese name
- Traditional Chinese: 蕭煌奇
- Simplified Chinese: 萧煌奇
Transcriptions
Standard Mandarin
- Hanyu Pinyin: Xiāo Huángqí
Yue: Cantonese
- Jyutping: siu1 wong4 kei4
Southern Min
- Hokkien POJ: Siau Hông-kî
- Website: www.xiaohuangchi.idv.tw

Hsiao Huang-chi (Chinese: 蕭煌奇; pinyin: Xiāo Huángqí; Wade–Giles: Hsiao^{1} Huang^{2}-chʻi^{2}; Pe̍h-ōe-jī: Siau Hông-kî; born 22 September 1976), also known as Ricky Hsiao, is a Taiwanese singer, songwriter and former judoka (2nd dan black belt). He represented Taiwan in FESPIC Games in Beijing in 1994, where he won the bronze title and placed seventh at the 1996 Atlanta Paralympics. Hsiao gained attention in the Taiwanese Hokkien pop scene after winning the Best Male Vocalist – Taiwanese award at the 19th Golden Melody Awards in 2008.

== Biography ==
Hsiao had congenital cataracts which led him to his blindness at birth, which was partially cured by surgery when he was 4. However his vision gradually deteriorated, and he completely lost his eyesight at age 15.

Hsiao played basketball in school and trained to the 2nd dan black belt level in judo, becoming a part of Taiwan's national team. He won a bronze medal at the 1994 FESPIC Games in Beijing before competing in the 1996 Paralympic Games in Atlanta. His music career began in 2002 with the release of his first album.

Hsiao had also gained a license to practice as a therapeutic masseur in high school. In 2012, he opened a massage clinic in Taipei, that employs blind and deaf people.

As of early 2024, Hsiao was nominated 19 times at the Golden Melody Awards, winning three Best Taiwanese Album and four Best Taiwanese Male Singer awards.

== Discography ==
=== Studio album ===
- 2002 You Are My Eyes
- 2004 Black Guitar
- 2006 Our Story / 我們的故事
- 2007 True Love
- 2008 I am Ricky Hsiao
- 2009 Man Who Loved Dreaming
- 2011 Lonely Chords
- 2011 Scripture of Reminiscence
- 2013 Good Sir
- 2014 The Most Beautiful Flower
- 2016 Mysterious World
- 2017 Cheers
- 2019 Migratory Bird
- 2021 Stage
- 2022 A Storytelling Song

=== Collaborations ===
- "Water Per Person" / 一人水一項 (2015) with Selina Ren (Hokkian)
- "Peaceful Breakup" / 和平分手 (2018) with Rachel Liang

== Published works ==
- Oral autobiography published in 2002 I Saw the Color of Notes (Crown Publishing Group Culture)

== Awards and nominations ==
- 1991 Golden Tripod eighth disabled the first song contest
- 1992 Golden Tripod disabled eighth winning singing contests
- 1994 International Talent Competition singing group of people with disabilities first
- 1994 Golden Lion Award for the visually impaired the first song contest
- 1995 / blind school students and younger brother learn the composition of the first visually impaired Orchestra "full-band."
- Special talents in 1996 the International Federation of Association of the Republic of China hosted the national selection of young musicians with disabilities second
- 1996 / participation in the United States in Atlanta, 1996 Paralympics, was seventh in judo. However, his grandmother died before he returned to Taiwan.
- Special talents in 1997 the International Federation of Association of the Republic of China hosted the national selection of disabled young musicians Western music group the second
- 1998 Executive Yuan CCA to host "First National Literary Prize for the Physically and Mentally Handicapped," the first songs the creative team
- 1998 Taipei Cultural and Educational Foundation, the visually impaired music visually impaired host the sixth group of the first vocal music competitions
- 1999 Executive Yuan CCA to host "Second National Literary Award for the Physically and Mentally Handicapped" creative music and lyrics the second group
- Thirty-seventh session in 1999 Ten Outstanding Young
- 2000 Executive Yuan CCA to host "The Third National Award for the Physically and Mentally Handicapped Wenhui" music and lyrics create a third group
- 2001 Executive Yuan CCA host, "Fourth National Award for the Physically and Mentally Handicapped Wenhui" music and lyrics the creative team first
- 2002 / publishing oral autobiography "I saw the color of the notes"
- 2003 / December 2002 launch of "You are my eyes", the same name by the "super-Avenue of Stars" contestants Yoga Lin covered again.
- Finalist in 2003 Golden Melody Awards "the best male singing" and "the best lyricist"
- 2003 Executive Yuan CCA host "physical and mental disabilities of the Fifth National Wenhui Award" music and lyrics the creative team first
- Finalist in 2005 Golden Melody Awards "best pop vocal album Taiwanese" and "the best male singing Taiwanese people"
- Finalist in 2008 Golden Melody Awards "the best male singing Taiwanese people," "the best Taiwanese language album," ( "true love" album) and "Best Composer" (short-listed entries: "love this song" I love songs in the album included)
- Golden Melody Awards in 2008 "the best male singing Taiwanese" and "the best Taiwanese language album," Prize Winner.
