= 37th Golden Melody Awards =

2026 award ceremony for music

- Native name: 第37屆金曲獎
- Date: June 27, 2026
- Venue: Taipei Arena (Taipei, Taiwan)
- Hosted by: A-Lin
- Most wins: Chang Chen-yue – Go With the Flow (3); Jolin Tsai – Pleasure (3)
- Most nominations: Jolin Tsai – Pleasure (9)
- Website: gma.tavis.tw

Television/radio coverage
- Network: TTV

The 37th Golden Melody Awards (Chinese: 第37屆金曲獎), organized by the Bureau of Audiovisual and Music Industry Development under the Ministry of Culture, were held its award ceremony on June 27, 2026, at the Taipei Arena.

== Background ==
For the 37th Golden Melody Awards, submissions were Still Moving from December 1, 2025, to January 2, 2026, and works released in 2025 were eligible for entry. The nomination period for the Special Contribution Award ran until March 13, 2025. Starting from this edition, new regulations allow the use of generative AI software as an assistive tool in music creation and production processes. However, works in which all components (such as composition, lyrics, arrangement, or vocals) are entirely generated by AI are not eligible for competition in the respective categories.

The nominations were announced on May 13. Jolin Tsai's Pleasure received the most nominations, with nine in total, while Warner led all submitting organizations with 16 nominations. Regarding notable omissions, jury chairperson Kay Huang stated that Yoga Lin, David Tao, and Pets Tseng were each discussed through several rounds during the selection process for the Best Mandarin Male and Female Singer awards. However, the final nominations ultimately followed the jury's established procedures, resulting in the final list announced this year.

== Performers ==
Artist(s)	Song(s)
A-Lin	This Is Music "Happiness Is Singing" "Silent Flower" "Pleasure" "Naru 37"
Hsien Ching	Best New Artist Award Winner performance "New Notes"
Trash & Traego	The Greatest Children's Song of the 21st Century "Fight with the Demon" "Hakka Sucker"
Hitsujibungaku	More Than Words "More Than Words"
Sun Shu-may	Catch Me "Secret Lover" "Mama, You Didn't Tell Me" "Catch Me"
Hebe Tien	In Remembrance Of Deceased Musicians "Conquer" "Disappear" "Carousel" "Leave Me" "Absent" "Springtime for the Wild Lilly"
Nick Chou & Billie Wang	"Circus Monkey" "I Feeling Good" "Afro Volcano" "Turn Up" "Nunchucks" "Hot Desert" "Three Days, Three Nights" "Nothing to Talk About" (2022 remix)
Karen Mok & The Masters	Beget "Do Not Love Me" "I" "How Much Time Do You Give Me?" "Beget" "Without You"

== Presenters ==
- Biung Wang and Sangpuy – presented Best Indigenous Singer and Best Indigenous Album
- Walis Pawan – presented Best Instrumental Recording Album and Best Vocal Recording Album
- Tarcy Su – presented Best Composer and Best Music Arrangement
- Julia Peng and William Wei – presented Best New Artist and Best Single Producer
- Hsiao Huang-chi and Ng Ki-pin – presented Best Lyricist and Best Music Video
- Huang Zixuan – presented Best Hakka Singer and Best Hakka Album
- Li Yuan – presented Special Contribution Award
- Baby Chung and Eric Hung – presented Best Composor (instrumental), Best Album Producer (instrumental), and Best Album (instrumental)
- Hsu Hsiao-shun and Siri Lee – presented Best Taiwanese Male Singer, Best Taiwanese Female Singer, and Best Taiwanese Album
- Kay Huang – presented Jury Award
- Winnie Hsin – presented Special Contribution Award
- Ma Nien-hsien and Yao Chun-min – presented Best Album Design and Best Band
- Peggy Hsu and Lulu Huang – presented Song of the Year
- Power Station – presented Best Vocal Group and Best Album Producer
- Trout Fresh and Waa Wei – presented Best Mandarin Male Singer and Best Mandarin Female Singer
- Karen Mok – presented Best Mandarin Album and Album of the Year

== Winners and nominees ==
The nominees were announced on May 13, 2026. Jolin Tsai received nine nominations, the most of any artist, followed by Jude Chiu with seven nominations and Chang Chen-yue with six nominations. The winners were announced on June 27, 2026, with Chang Chen-yue and Jolin Tsai emerging as the most awarded artists of the night, each securing three awards.

Vocal Category - Publishing Awards
Album of the Year	Song of the Year
Jolin Tsai – Pleasure: Hong Pei-yu – Still Moving; MJ116 – OGS; Chang Chen-yue – Go With the Flow; Jude Chiu – Leaving the Silver Waste Land; Shan Yichun – Lil Sis; Enno Cheng – Moon Phases; Ricky Hsiao – Soft Hearted; Justin Su – Theme Song; Wu Yung-chi – My Bare-Ass Brothers; CJ Mit – My Words; A-Yi Lo – Southern Winter; Ana – Final Girl; ChuNoodle – Descend Up, Ascend Down; Sarah Chen – Slow Flower Chronicles; Huang Yu-han – Ngai; Outlet Drift – Masonolay i Cepo'; Lawis Aow – Saitikotiko; Arase – AKA; Suming – Mikerid; Matzka – Djekuacan; The Crane – Same Stories, Different Narratives; Sunset Rollercoaster – Quit Quietly	A-Lin – "Happiness Is Singing" (from Happiness Is Singing): Sam Yang – "In the Middle" (from Daily Diner); Chang Chen-yue – "Surfer's Love Story" (from Go With the Flow); Jolin Tsai – "Pleasure" (from Pleasure); Salsa Chen – "Old Wings" (from Old Wings); Hsien Ching – "If We Can Be Happy Happy Every Day, Who Wants to Be Sad" (from If We Can Be Happy Happy Every Day, Who Wants to Be Sad); A-Mei – "My Existence Is to Love You" (from My Existence Is to Love You)
Best Mandarin Album	Best Taiwanese Album
Chang Chen-yue – Go With the Flow: Hong Pei-yu – Still Moving; MJ116 – OGS; Jolin Tsai – Pleasure; Jude Chiu – Leaving the Silver Waste Land; Shan Yichun – Lil Sis	Ricky Hsiao – Soft Hearted: Enno Cheng – Moon Phases; Justin Su – Theme Song; Wu Yung-chi – My Bare-Ass Brothers; CJ Mit – My Words
Best Hakka Album	Best Indigenous Album
Huang Yu-han – Ngai: A-Yi Lo – Southern Winter; Ana – Final Girl; ChuNoodle – Descend Up, Ascend Down; Sarah Chen – Slow Flower Chronicles	Outlet Drift – Masonolay i Cepo': Lawis Aow – Saitikotiko; Arase – AKA; Suming – Mikerid; Matzka – Djekuacan
Vocal Category - Individual Awards
Best Composer	Best Lyricist
Chang Chen-yue – "Surfer's Love Story" (from Go With the Flow, by Chang Chen-yue): Lu Lu-ming – "A Foggy Midnight" (from A Foggy Tale, by 9m88); Ricky Hsiao and Diiton – "Ur Not Looking" (from Soft Hearted, by Ricky Hsiao); Alex Chang Jien – "Count to Ten" (from Stay Tuned, by Pets Tseng); Ng Ki-pin – "How Do I Go on Without You" (from How Do I Go on Without You, by Ng Ki-pin); Jude Chiu – "Silver Waste Land" (from Leaving the Silver Waste Land, by Jude Chiu)	Xiao Han – "Roommate" (from Incompletely Fully Grown, by Julia Peng): Chang Chen-yue – "Mama's Eyes" (from Go With the Flow, by Chang Chen-yue); Wu Hsiung – "Miner Brothers" (from My Bare-Ass Brothers, by Wu Yung-chi); Gummy B – "War & Luv" (from Better, by Gummy B); Katie Lee – "Silver Waste Land" (from Leaving the Silver Waste Land, by Jude Chiu)
Best Music Arrangement	Best Album Producer
Jude Chiu and Tsui Chin Hung – "Silver Waste Land" (from Leaving the Silver Waste Land, by Jude Chiu): Wico Weng – "Tired of Traveling Alone" (from Goldfish in the Tank, by A-Dan); Nick Chou, Seann Bowe, Wayne Lin, and Ruben Cardenas – "Flames" (from Love Rage Hope, by Nick Chou); Starr Chen, A-Hao, Morrison Ma, CYH, Richard Craker, Jackson Dimiglio-Wood – "DIY" (from Pleasure, by Jolin Tsai); Walis Pawan – "Quack Fu" (from Quack Fu, by Walis Pawan)	Chang Shilei – Lil Sis (by Shan Yichun): Shuo Hsiao – Minsumin (by Panai); The Crane – Same Stories, Different Narratives (by The Crane); Yuchain Wang and Michael Tseng – Quit Quietly (by Sunset Rollercoaster); Jolin Tsai and Starr Chen – Pleasure (by Jolin Tsai); Jude Chiu and Tonyi Ng – Leaving the Silver Waste Land (by Jude Chiu)
Best Single Producer	Best Mandarin Male Singer
Øzi and The Crane – "Final Final Final" (from Swirl, by Øzi, Gummy B, and The Crane): Kvnloverboy – "Superwoman" (from Superwoman, by Karencici); Walis Pawan and A-len Yue – "Quack Fu" (from Quack Fu, by Walis Pawan); George Chen – "Happiness Is Singing" (from Happiness Is Singing, by A-Lin); Howe Chen and Greeny Wu – "Turn of Thought, In the Water " (from Turn of Thought, by Greeny Wu and Chyi Yu)	Chang Chen-yue – Go With the Flow: Nick Chou – Love Rage Hope; Crowd Lu – HeartBreakFast; Gummy B – Better; Jude Chiu – Leaving the Silver Waste Land
Best Mandarin Female Singer	Best Taiwanese Male Singer
Jolin Tsai – Pleasure: Hong Pei-yu – Still Moving; Hsien Ching – If Every Day Could Be Happy Happy, Who Would Want Sad; Julia Peng – Incompletely Fully Grown; Erika Liu – Pisces Palace; Shan Yichun – Lil Sis	Ricky Hsiao – Soft Hearted: Wu Yung-chi – My Bare-Ass Brothers; Kuljelje Salevelev – Pig-Headed; Since Chou – Homunculus; CJ Mit – My Words
Best Taiwanese Female Singer	Best Hakka Singer
PiA – Divorce Debut: Enno Cheng – Moon Phases; Anita Chen – 30s; Showlen Maya – Thih Sim-kuann; Pai Bing-bing – Lin jiu jiang jiu hua	Sarah Chan – Blue Hour Bloom: A-Yi Lo – Southern Winter; Ana – Final Girl; ChuNoodle – Descend Up, Ascend Down; Sarah Chen – Slow Flower Chronicles; Huang Yu-han – Ngai
Best Indigenous Singer	Best Band
Suming – Mikerid: Lawis Aow – Saitikotiko; Arase – AKA; Chalaw Basiwali – Kami Kami; Matzka – Djekuacan	Sunset Rollercoaster – Quit Quietly: Icyball – Sorry; Outlet Drift – Masonolay i Cepo'; Your Woman Sleep With Others – Roaming in the Night; Accusefive – The Dreamers; Sweet John – Good Afternight; Tizzy Bac – Say My Name
Best Vocal Group	Best New Artist
Genblue – Mirror: MJ116 – OGS; Our Shame – Hidden Album; The Chairs – Love Dialogue; Dac and Zaoyuan – Enough	Hsien Ching – If Every Day Could Be Happy Happy, Who Would Want Sad: Tru – Alive; 163 Braces – Hairochi; Sarah Chen – Slow Flower Chronicles; CJ Mit – My Words; Joyce – Talent Flower
Instrumental Category - Publishing Awards
Best Album	
Su Yu-han – Over the Moons: Oberka – Regrow Protocol; Da Gong – Path of the Heart; Rich Huang and Alex Wu – Dual Legendary Rhythms: A New Worldview; Cool Nel D – Reel Mu$ic	
Instrumental Category - Individual Awards
Best Album Producer	Best Composer
Rich Huang and Alex Wu – Dual Legendary Rhythms: A New Worldview (by Rich Huang and Alex Wu): Su Yu-han – Over the Moons (by Su Yu-han); Oberka – Regrow Protocol (by Oberka); Vam Ding – Wild Nights, Tamed Beasts (by Vam Ding); Da Gong – Path of the Heart (by Da Gong)	Su Yu-han – "Pieces Peace" (from Over the Moons, by Su Yu-han, Alex LoRe, Anna Webber, Matt Mitchell, Chen Ying-da, Marty Kenney, James Paul Nadien, Shinya Lin): Will'z Chieng – "Harsanik" (from Stargazing, by Bazaar); Lynn Huang – "Spring" (from Kaleidoscope Rhapsody, by Rhapsody Trio); Rich Huang and Alex Wu – "Gold" (from Dual Legendary Rhythms: A New Worldview, Rich Huang and Alex Wu); Li Jun – "Justice of Residence" (from Justice of Residence, by Li Jun); Nelson Thomas Ny-Devereaux – "Rentfree" (from Reel Mu$ic, by Cool Nel D)
Technical Category - Publishing Awards
Best Music Video	Best Vocal Recording Album
Reago Lin – "Dumplings" (from Sorry, by Icyball): Gua Xixi – "Lil Sis" (from Lil Sis, by Shan Yichun); Sijin Liu – "Sakura Gansha" (from Suí, by Siri Lee); Tom Lin – "In this Moment" (from Sorrow's Resting Hollow, by Peggy Hsu); Alx112 and Autotuna– "A Strange Love Song" (from Apples of Thy Eye, by Yoga Lin); Ai Chen and Barry Tu – "Reset→0" (from Crossroad→0, by Kumachan and Joanna Wang); Christian Breslauer – "Pleasure" (from Pleasure, by Jolin Tsai); Rodrigo Inada – "Fish Love" (from Pleasure, by Jolin Tsai)	Jolin Tsai – Pleasure: Ivy Lee – Be the Change You Want to See; Estelle Perrault – Promises; Matzka – Djekuacan; Miss Ko – Soul, Food
Best Instrumental Recording Album	
Taxodium – I Am Here: Su Yu-han – Over the Moons; DonSir – Coanda Effect; Hsu Wei-san – Invisible Nation; Lu Lu-ming, Lin Hsiao-chin, and Lin Szu-yu – We and Evil II	
Technical Category - Individual Awards
Best Album Design	
FK Wu and Alx112 – Sax Tape (by Sax Machine): Huang Jia-hong – Roaming in the Night (by Your Woman Sleep With Others); Liu Yueh-te – Ū bí-bāng siōng tsán (by Yu Pei-jen); Huang Pin-chia and Wang Hsin – Sleep (by Chiang I-chun and Liao Yu-meng); Aaron Nieh, Chen Sheng-chih, and Lin Chih-kai – Daughters Poems by Ling Yu Music (by Lo Si-rong); FK Wu, Li Wang, and Hitsu Pi – Hidden Album (by Our Shame)	
Jury Award
Salsa Chen – Old Wings
Special Contribution Award
Max Tu; Lin Huang-kun
