= Ng Ki-pin =

Taiwanese singer-songwriter and actor (born 1990)

Ng Ki-pin 黃奇斌
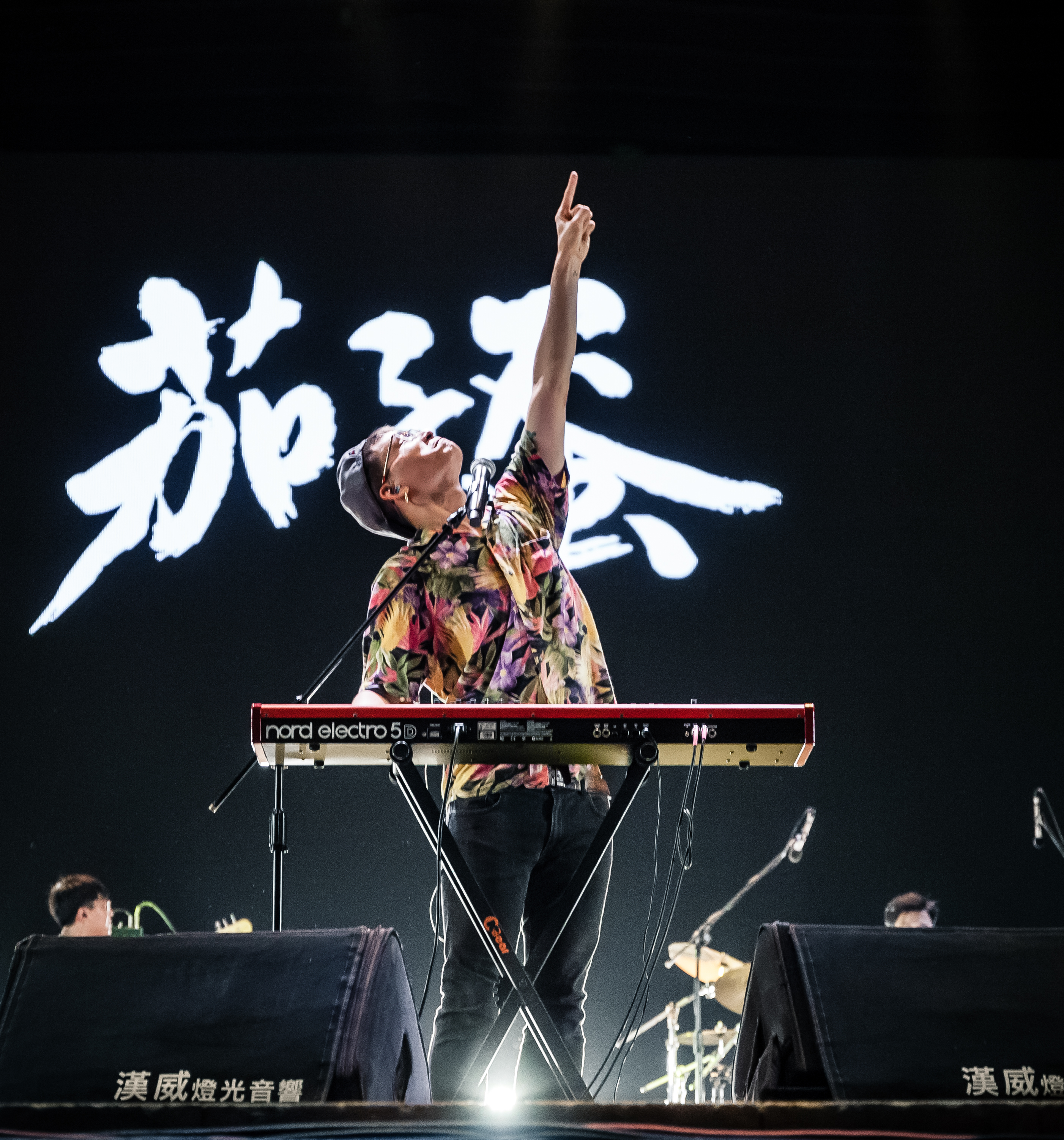
- Ng performing at Wenxin Forest Park, Taichung in 2019

Background information
- Born: 1990 (age 35–36); Taiwan
- Education: National Chengchi University
- Occupations: Singer-songwriter; actor
- Years active: 2012–present
- Member of: EggPlantEgg (2012–present)
- Website: Ng Ki-pin on Instagram

Ng Ki-pin (Chinese: 黃奇斌; Pe̍h-ōe-jī: N̂g Kî-pin; born 1990) is a Taiwanese singer-songwriter and actor. In 2012, while in college, he co-founded the Taiwanese Hokkien indie rock band EggPlantEgg. The band won Best New Artist and Best Taiwanese Album for Cartoon Characters in the 29th Golden Melody Awards, and Song of the Year for "Oh Love, You Are Much Greater Than I Imagined" in the 33rd Golden Melody Awards. After the band went on hiatus in 2022, Ng launched his solo career in July 2025 upon signing with Universal Music Taiwan.

Ng made his acting debut in the Netflix series GG Precinct (2024). He has since starred in the films Yen and Ai-Lee (2024), 96 Minutes (2025), and Dead End (2026).

== Early life and career ==
Ng was born in 1990 into a Taiwanese Hokkien-speaking household. He learned to play the piano at church and began studying the erhu at a young age. While attending Taipei Municipal Song Shan Senior High School, he joined the school's band club.

In 2009, he enrolled at National Chengchi University, majoring in advertising. During his studies, he co-founded the band EggPlantEgg in 2012 with his former high school bandmates, and the group participated in the 29th NCCU Golden Melody Awards. Their debut EP, Yiu-uan Tī Chit–ê (猶原佇這), featuring the song "Wandering Son Returns" (浪子回頭), was released in 2013. By 2014, the other members had left the band for personal pursuits, leaving Ng as its sole remaining member. He subsequently reformed the band with new members, including guitarists Tsai Kai-jen and Hsieh Yao-te, and drummer Lai Chun-ting.

After completing his mandatory military service in the summer of 2015, Ng decided to pursue a full-time music career. To support himself, he worked part-time at a breakfast restaurant and as a piano tutor while composing songs and posting them on Facebook.

== Music career ==
=== EggPlantEgg (2012–present) ===
In 2017, EggPlantEgg independently released their debut studio album, Cartoon Characters, which won Best Taiwanese Album and earned the group the Best New Artist in the 29th Golden Melody Awards. In 2019, their song "Waves Wandering" was nominated for Song of the Year in the 30th Golden Melody Awards. In 2020, their album We Will Get Married Later received nominations for Best Band, Best Taiwanese Album, and Best Album Packaging in the 31st Golden Melody Awards.

Their song "Oh Love, You Are Much Greater Than I Imagined", featured in the 2021 film Man in Love, was nominated for Best Original Film Song in the 58th Golden Horse Awards, and won Song of the Year in the 33rd Golden Melody Awards.

In September 2022, EggPlantEgg announced an indefinite hiatus due to Ng suffering vocal cord damage.

=== Solo career (2025–present) ===
Ng returned to the stage in April 2023 as a guest performer for the group Nine One One's concert, and on 1 July 2023, he performed at the 34th Golden Melody Awards ceremony alongside guitarist Ken Ohtake.

In July 2025, after his voice had recovered, he signed with Universal Music Taiwan and officially began his solo career. His first solo single "Where Would I Go Without You" (若無你我欲去佗位) was released in July 2025. Ng is set to release his first solo album The Dream of Vanity Cuts Deep (虛華的夢想是一支刀) in July 2026.

== Acting career ==
Ng made his acting debut as an undercover police officer in the 2024 Netflix series GG Precinct. He said that he experienced "self-doubt and uncertainty" during his hiatus from music and "rediscovered his creative passion through acting".

In the same year, he made his film debut in a leading role as a chicken hawker who is secretly in love with the female protagonist (played by Kimi Hsia) in Yen and Ai-Lee, for which he was nominated for Best New Talent in the 27th Taipei Film Awards. He also played one half of a couple who run a boxing gym alongside Tracy Chou in the iQIYI action series M Mission.

Ng made his Hakka-language acting debut in the 2025 Hakka TV series Black Tide Island, and appeared in the action film 96 Minutes, which became a commercial success. He also performed the film's theme song, "How Do I Go On Without You". In 2026, he starred in the thriller film Dead End alongside another band member-turned-actor Daniel Hong and Eleven Yao.

== Personal life ==
Ng is a Christian. He married his talent manager Juno in July 2024 after ten years of dating.
