= 36th Golden Melody Awards =

2025 award ceremony for music

- Native name: 第36屆金曲獎
- Date: June 28, 2025
- Venue: Taipei Arena (Taipei, Taiwan)
- Most wins: Siri Lee – Suí (3); Hyukoh & Sunset Rollercoaster – AAA (3)
- Most nominations: Hyukoh & Sunset Rollercoaster – AAA (7)
- Website: tavis.tw/gma/36th

Television/radio coverage
- Network: TTV

The 36th Golden Melody Awards (Chinese: 第36屆金曲獎), organized by the Bureau of Audiovisual and Music Industry Development under the Ministry of Culture, were held on June 28, 2025, at the Taipei Arena in Taipei, Taiwan.

The collaborative album AAA by Hyukoh and Sunset Rollercoaster received the most nominations, with a total of seven. Ultimately, AAA and Siri Lee's album Suí each won three awards, tying for the most awards of the night.

== Background ==
Submissions for the 36th Golden Melody Awards were accepted from December 2, 2024 to January 3, 2025, with all works released during 2024 eligible for consideration. Nominations for the Special Contribution Award remained open until May 2, 2025. This edition introduced eligibility for instrumental music videos in the Best Music Video category and relaxed the digital release deadline requirements for works competing for Best Album Design.

A total of 291 record labels and production companies submitted 1,648 albums and 23,486 entries for award consideration. Following a three-month evaluation process, including preliminary review, eligibility screening, and final nomination review, 169 works were nominated across 27 award categories, with the nominations announced on May 14, 2025. On the same day, the Jury Award was posthumously presented to Khalil Fong for his final album, The Dreamer, while the Special Contribution Award was awarded to Weng Hsiao-liang and Ma Chao-chun.

The collaborative album AAA by Taiwanese band Sunset Rollercoaster and South Korean band Hyukoh led all nominees with seven nominations. Jury chair Ting Hsiao-wen stated that every nominated work advanced through at least two rounds of voting. Deliberations for Song of the Year were especially extensive, resulting in the nomination list being expanded to eight songs. Among notable omissions, Yoga Lin and the late Coco Lee both reached the final round of voting for Best Mandarin Male Singer and Best Mandarin Female Singer, respectively, but were ultimately not nominated.

Most winners were decided by an outright majority in the first round of final voting, including the recipient of Best Mandarin Male Singer. In contrast, the Best Mandarin Female Singer award required three rounds of voting, with Waa Wei ultimately emerging as the winner.

== Winners and nominees ==
Vocal Category - Publishing Awards
Album of the Year	Song of the Year
Suí (performed by: Siri Lee): Incomplete Rescue Manual (performed by: various artists (Note: Sandy Lam, Cyndi Wang, Cheer Chen, Hush, Pei-Yu Hung, Su Yunying, Huang Qishan, A-Lin, Sandee Chan, George Chen, Kuo Hung Tseng from Sunset Rollercoaster, Arai Soichiro, Ice Paper, JIHU, Kafe Hu, KST, Jade Chiu, Jiji Lee from Project Ace, James Lee, Qin Sifeng, Masa from Mayday, Von Citizen, Turing Music Laboratory, 3 Dogs(Xu Jun, Arai Soichiro, Sanbist Lin), Ivana Wong, Wang OK, Bernard Zheng, Zhou Yunpeng, Zhang Yuhan Leezi)); OUTCOMES (performed by: J.Sheon); CAMOUFLAGE (performed by: Terence Lam); The Dreamer (performed by: Khalil Fong); GOOD SOUND WITH ATTITUDES (performed by: Trout Fresh); Ordeal by Pearls (performed by: Waa Wei); People like us (performed by: Su-hao Yang); People, Places, Things (performed by: FunkyMo); can cancan cancancan (performed by: Chen Yi Heng); phian-lâm (performed by: Ming-Yo Hsieh); Drip-Drop (performed by: Hui Chu Wang); In and Out of Dreams (performed by: Aringu); Pure Filth (performed by: TRAEGO); New Soul (performed by: ZiXuan Huang); The women's voice (performed by: Lo Ssu-Jung, Misa, Yang Shu-Yu, and Chiu Shu-Chan); Upstream (performed by: Rita Lin); na secengeceng tua venali (performed by: Giyu Tjuljaviya); kamawan za kavung (performed by: Morikilr); QUEENDOM (performed by: Abus Tanapima); Qrasun (performed by: Kumu Basaw); Draw Near (performed by: SANGPUY); VAIVAIK (performed by: Sauljaljui)	"Friday Night" – Here I Am (performed by: Energy): "BUNUN" – QUEENDOM (performed by: Abus Tanapima); "Phone, Wallet, Keys, Cigarettes" – Amazing Show (performed by: Amazing Show, Crowd Lu); "phian-lâm-hong" – phian-lâm (performed by: Ming-Yo Hsieh); "Young Man" – AAA (performed by: Hyukoh & Sunset Rollercoaster); "Twenty Three" – The Dreamer (performed by: Khalil Fong); "Isha's Song" – Isha's Song (performed by: Eason Chan); "Je prends, je prends. Je vais voir." – Suí (performed by: Siri Lee)
Best Mandarin Album	Best Taiwanese Album
GOOD SOUND WITH ATTITUDES (performed by: Trout Fresh): Incomplete Rescue Manual (performed by: various artists); OUTCOMES (performed by: J.Sheon); CAMOUFLAGE (performed by: Terence Lam); The Dreamer (performed by: Khalil Fong); Ordeal by Pearls (performed by: Waa Wei)	Suí (performed by: Siri Lee): People like us (performed by: Su-hao Yang); People, Places, Things (performed by: FunkyMo); can cancan cancancan (performed by: Chen Yi Heng); phian-lâm (performed by: Ming-Yo Hsieh); Drip-Drop (performed by: Hui Chu Wang)
Best Hakka Album	Best Indigenous Album
New Soul (performed by: ZiXuan Huang): In and Out of Dreams (performed by: Aringu); Pure Filth (performed by: TRAEGO); The women's voice (performed by: Lo Ssu-Jung, Misa, Yang Shu-Yu, and Chiu Shu-Chan); Upstream (performed by: Rita Lin)	VAIVAIK (performed by: Sauljaljui): na secengeceng tua venali (performed by: Giyu Tjuljaviya); kamawan za kavung (performed by: Morikilr); QUEENDOM (performed by: Abus Tanapima); Qrasun (performed by: Kumu Basaw); Draw Near (performed by: SANGPUY)
Vocal Category - Individual Awards
Best Composer	Best Lyricist
Khalil Fong – "Twenty Three" – The Dreamer (performed by: Khalil Fong): JUD – "Redbreast" – JUD 1st EP (performed by: JUD); FunkyMo – "Carfix" – People, Places, Things (performed by: FunkyMo); Hui Chu Wang – "Cabbage Congee" – Drip-Drop (performed by: Hui Chu Wang, Pei-Yu Hung); Terence Lam – "Shade" – CAMOUFLAGE (performed by: Terence Lam); Joanna Wang – "Dead Talents Society" – Dead Talents Society (performed by: Joanna Wang)	Giyu Tjuljaviya – "Child of the South Link (Home to Home)" – The Wind that Found Me (performed by: Giyu Tjuljaviya): Katie Lee – "Fragments of Becoming" – Fragments of Becoming (performed by: PoLin Tung); Ming-Yo Hsieh – "phian-lâm-hong" – phian-lâm (performed by: Ming-Yo Hsieh); Lin Xi – "Shade" – CAMOUFLAGE (performed by: Terence Lam); Khalil Fong – "Twenty Three" – The Dreamer (performed by: Khalil Fong); Siri Lee – "Je prends, je prends. Je vais voir." – Suí (performed by: Siri Lee)
Best Arranger	Best Album Producer
Sauljaljui, Vikung Ruljadeng – "Dipin Kari Tang" – VAIVAIK (performed by: Sauljaljui, Taiwu Ballads Troupe): Charles Chang – "BUNUN" – QUEENDOM (performed by: Abus Tanapima); Ray Lin – "Praise" – Qrasun (performed by: Kumu Basaw, Ray Lin); Baby-C – "Draw near" – Draw Near (performed by: SANGPUY); LuuX – "New Game" – GOOD SOUND WITH ATTITUDES (performed by: Trout Fresh); Joanna Wang, Asher Fulero, Peter Knudsen, Bill Athens, Micah Kassell, J Geddes – "Dead Talents Society" – Dead Talents Society (performed by: Joanna Wang)	CJ Hightide – The Wind that Found Me (performed by: Giyu Tjuljaviya): Bing Wang – Weak Messages Create Bad Situations (performed by: JUD); OHHYUK, TSENG KUO HUNG – AAA (performed by: Hyukoh & Sunset Rollercoaster); Terence Lam – CAMOUFLAGE (performed by: Terence Lam); LuuX, Trout Fresh – GOOD SOUND WITH ATTITUDES (performed by: Trout Fresh); Baby-C, Siri Lee – Suí (performed by: Siri Lee)
Best Song Producer	Best Mandarin Male Singer
Déjà Fu – "BUNUN" – QUEENDOM (performed by: Abus Tanapima): Jacky Chen – "Taiwanese Imperial Serviceman" – People like us (performed by: Su-hao Yang); WOO.K, KIM JIHO – "COCOCO" – COCOCO (performed by: GENBLUE); Baby-C – "Draw near" – Draw Near (performed by: SANGPUY); Blaire Ko – "Huh?" – Huh? (performed by: A_Root)	Trout Fresh – GOOD SOUND WITH ATTITUDES: PoLin Tung – Fragments of Becoming; Ricky Hsiao – No Worries; Terence Lam – CAMOUFLAGE; Ronghao Li – Black Horse
Best Mandarin Female Singer	Best Taiwanese Male Singer
Waa Wei – Ordeal by Pearls: Tanya Chua – Imperfect Us; Penny Tai – TWIN FLAME (Taiwan Branch); Vicky Chen – V; Karencici – Made For You	Chen Yi Heng – can cancan cancancan: Su-hao Yang – People like us; FunkyMo – People, Places, Things; Ming-Yo Hsieh – phian-lâm; SAVAGE.M – hái-kháu
Best Taiwanese Female Singer	Best Hakka Singer
Siri Lee – Suí: Carris Tsai – hì tâi; Lin Mei Hsiu – Lady Pum Pum; Hui Chu Wang – Drip-Drop; Zhan Ya Wen – Perform a song	ZiXuan Huang – New Soul: Aringu – In and Out of Dreams; TRAEGO – Pure Filth; Misa Wen – Deer Penguin; Rita Lin – Upstream
Best Indigenous Singer	Best Band
Kumu Basaw – Qrasun: Morikilr – kamawan za kavung; Abus Tanapima – QUEENDOM; SANGPUY – Draw Near; Sauljaljui – VAIVAIK; Dremedreman – The chosen one of the village	TRASH – The Last Train of Happiness: No-nonsense Collective – The Pirate Ship Sailing to Heaven; JADE – Creeper; Amazing Show – Amazing Show; Hyukoh & SUNSET ROLLERCOASTER – AAA; 88balaz – Legend of the Romantic Baseball Warriors
Best Vocal Group	Best New Artist
Power Station – Always with you: The Dinosaur's Skin – I Dig You; Energy – Here I Am; Collage – Deus Ex Machina; DDMM – RUN, DON'T WALK; ATARASHII GAKKO! – AG! Calling	someshiit – A FOOL: SherryZ – Time; Giyu Tjuljaviya – The Wind that Found Me; JUD – Weak Messages Create Bad Situations; Kumu Basaw – Qrasun; Andr – shhh, it's under my bed
Instrumental Category - Publishing Awards
Best Album	
The Études (performed by: Joyce Cheung): OR (performed by: Tracy Yang Jazz Orchestra); Tainai (performed by: Lu Shao Chun); The Temporals (performed by: JUE); Beyond (performed by: Baby-C)	
Instrumental Category - Individual Awards
Best Album Producer	Best Composer
Szx., HadiT – Eong (performed by: Eong, Szx., HadiT): Jay Cheng – Aftertaste (performed by: Debby Wang); Joyce Cheung – The Études (performed by: Joyce Cheung); Lu Shao Chun – Tainai (performed by: Lu Shao Chun); Shuon Tsai – Memorable voice Liftime ROCK 40th (performed by: Just Busy Music Studio)	YuChia Wang, FlyingPP, Shan Lin – "Triple Helix" – How Many Hippos (performed by: How Many Hippos): Tracy Yang – "OR" – OR (performed by: Tracy Yang Jazz Orchestra); Tom Bourgeois – "5 Flamingos" – 5 Flamingos (performed by: Tom Bourgeois, Kuo Chun-Yu); Joyce Cheung – "Étude No.1 in D – Carpark" – The Études (performed by: Joyce Cheung, Dean Li, JAckiZ Tsang, Tsui Chin Hung, Sean Lai, Bernard Chan); WENG QU XIAN, Szx. , HadiT, HAN SHU FAN – "A Flying Kite" – Eong (performed by: Eong, Szx., HadiT)
Technical Category - Publishing Awards
Best Music Video	Best Vocal Recording Album
"Antenna" – AAA (Director: rafhoo): "Young Man" – AAA (Director: Pennacky); "Essential Blues" – CHECK CHECK (Director: Autotuna); "Dab Hi" – Dab Hi (Director: Teom Chen); "Once a Dream" – Disgusted Artist (Director: Reago); "Buzz" – Buzz (Director: Isaac Ravishankara)	AAA (Recording Engineers: SangHyun Cho, HyeSeok Oh, Yuchain Wang, YJ (Moollon), James Fouren – Main Mixing Engineers: Norman Nitzsche – Main Mastering Post-Production: Norman Nitzsche): My Nova (Recording Engineers: Lin Shang-Po, Kao Chin-Lun, Ju Pin-Hao, Yi Lin Chen, Chou Han Tsay – Main Mixing Engineers: Yuchain Wang, Ziya Huang, ShenB, Howe – Main Mastering Post-Production: Alex Wharton ); Creeper (Recording Engineers: Chou Han Tsay, dooodooo, J.J.Ciou, Zen Chien, Thomas Chuang – Main Mixing Engineers: Itun Chou – Main Mastering Post-Production: Itun Chou); South Expedition (Recording Engineers: Jason Hsu, Zen Chien, Hardcore Chen, BonBon Chen, Chen Yi Lin, Chou Han Tsay, Pin-Hao Ju, Audry Garcia Dionsio, L8ching – Main Mixing Engineers: Jason Hsu, Zen Chien, Hardcore Chen, Burgerlin, Ziya Huang – Main Mastering Post-Production: Alex Wharton); Ordeal by Pearls (Recording Engineers: Yi Lin Chen, Zen Chien, Yu Shih Cheng, Lin Shang-Po, Chou Han Tsay, Pin-Hao Ju, Agwen Yu – Main Mixing Engineers: Wayson Scream, Huang Shao Yong, Simon Li, Thomas Chuang, Ziya Huang, Cheng Chung Lin, Howe – Main Mastering Post-Production: Wayson Scream); VILLAIN (Recording Engineers: Chace, Alice – Main Mixing Engineers: Chace – Main Mastering Post-Production: Chace)
Best Instrumental Recording Album	
OR (Recording Engineers: Brian Montgomery – Main Mixing Engineers: Brian Montgomery – Main Mastering Post-Production: Mark Wilder): Aftertaste (Recording Engineers: Chou Han Tsay – Main Mixing Engineers: Jay Cheng – Main Mastering Post-Production: Zino Mikorey); The Études (Recording Engineers: Link Shan, Yu Shih Cheng, Chen Chia Ying – Main Mixing Engineers: Link Shan – Main Mastering Post-Production: Jeff Lipton, Maria Rice, Costanza Tinti); 7 Seven (Recording Engineers: You Li, Yu Han Zhang, Li Yang – Main Mixing Engineers: You Li – Main Mastering Post-Production: You Li); Ctrl+Z (Recording Engineers: Chou Han Tsai – Main Mixing Engineers: Jay Cheng, Howe, Kevin Fu – Main Mastering Post-Production: Jeff Lipton)	
Technical Category - Individual Awards
Best Album Design	
Chanhee Hong, Na Kim – AAA: Yueh Yueh Liu – People, Places, Things; Yu Wei – Wang PiNk Ryu Freestyle; FKWU, Hitsu, 777much – I See You; Andrew Wong, Julie Yeh – Jug Band Millionaire	
Jury Award
Khalil Fong – The Dreamer
Special Contribution Award
Hsiao-liang Weng; Chao-chun Ma
