= 33rd Golden Melody Awards =

Taiwan music awards ceremony in 2022

- Date: July 2, 2022 (Popular music)
- Venue: Kaohsiung Arena (Popular music)
- Hosted by: Daniel Lo
- Most wins: Tanya Chua, Ayugo Huang (Note: Ayugo Huang was also the member of New Formosa Band, thus the win for Best Vocal Group was counted as his fourth win overall.)
- Website: gma.tavis.tw/gm33/index.htm

Television/radio coverage
- Network: TTV; TaiwanPlus (English broadcast, outside Taiwan) (Note: The YouTube broadcast was aired in Southeast Asia ex. Singapore & Malaysia, India and Japan. The watch party without the footage from GMA was also streamed on Facebook.)

The 33rd Golden Melody Awards (Chinese: 第33屆金曲獎) took place in Kaohsiung Arena, Kaohsiung, Taiwan in 2022, which marked its return at Kaohsiung City since the 16th edition. The award ceremony for the popular music categories was hosted by Daniel Lo and broadcast on TTV on 2 July 2022.

Tanya Chua received the most nominations with eight and won three major awards for Best Female Mandarin Singer, Best Mandarin Album and Album of the Year. She is the first singer to ever win Best Mandarin Album and Album of the Year at the same time, after the award was reintroduced in the 28th Golden Melody Awards. Chua is now the holder of "Most Wins for a Performer" in the Best Female Mandarin Singer category.

== Winners and nominees ==
Vocal category – Record label awards
Album of the Year	Song of the Year
DEPART – Tanya Chua; Faye, Wen Ting Zhan Zai Yun Cai Shang Tiao Wu Ji Ji Zha Zha – Faye; AI-CHING – Jerry LI; HAVE A NICE DAY – Waa Wei; Night Shift – Non-Physical Troupe (NPT); A Flying Dog – Cui Jian; Jian Jian Hua – New Formosa Band; Road to... – Lilium; GOLDEN TAIZI BRO – Flesh Juicer; Don't Know – Wang Jun-Jie; Kuu – Joey Chiang; Second Half – Hanya; Return To Reality – Huang Yu Han; Mountain Of Doom – Ayugo Huang; Today is a Wild Horse – Lo Sirong; Hakka Found In Strange Land – iColor; Qiam – Bobiii P; UNDO – Wild Thing; To Wait In Silence – Osay Hongay; pongso no Tao – Paudull; 《N1》Nanguaq No.1 – Natsuko, Arase, Dremedreman, Stingie, Drangadrang, Makav, Kivi; Our Island – Small Island Big Song - featuring - Sauljaljui, Putad Pihay, Emlyn, Vaiteani, Selina Leem, Sammy, Yoyo Tuki; I Thought I Didn't Know – Kerekilj	"Oh Love, You Are Greater Than I Imagined" (from Oh Love, You Are Greater Than I Imagined) – EggPlantEgg; "Mountain of Doom" (from Mountain of Doom) – Ayugo Huang and Sangpuy; "Bluebirds" (from DEPART) – Tanya Chua; "Dear Grandma" (from HAVE A NICE DAY) – Waa Wei; "Fragile (from Ghosician)" – Namewee and Kimberley Chen; "Red Scarf (WeiBird song)" (from Red Scarf) – William Wei; "DEATH TRIP" (from DEATH TRIP) – ØZI and Soft Lipa; "Prototype" (from Prototype) – Lala Hsu
Best Mandarin Album	Best Taiwanese Album
DEPART – Tanya Chua; Faye, Wen Ting Zhan Zai Yun Cai Shang Tiao Wu Ji Ji Zha Zha – Faye; AI-CHING – Jerry LI; HAVE A NICE DAY – Waa Wei; Night Shift – Non-Physical Troupe (NPT); A Flying Dog – Cui Jian	Road to... – Lilium; Jian Jian Hua – New Formosa Band; GOLDEN TAIZI BRO – Flesh Juicer; Don't Know – Wang Jun-Jie; Kuu – Joey Chiang; Second Half – Hanya
Best Hakka Album	Best Aboriginal Album (Indigenous Languages)
Mountain Of Doom – Ayugo Huang; Return To Reality – Huang Yu Han; Today is a Wild Horse – Lo Sirong; Hakka Found In Strange Land – iColor; Qiam – Bobiii P	pongso no Tao – Paudull; UNDO – Wild Thing; To Wait In Silence – Osay Hongay; 《N1》Nanguaq No.1 – Natsuko, Arase, Dremedreman, Stingie, Drangadrang, Makav, Kivi; Our Island – Small Island Big Song - Featuring - Sauljaljui, Putad Pihay, Emlyn, Vaiteani, Selina Leem, Sammy, Yoyo Tuki; I Thought I Didn't Know – Kerekilj
Best Music Video	
ganbatene (from ganbatene) – Director: TSAI, YI-YU; Mark Twain (from Paramount) – Director: Lin Mao Z; None of the Above (from None of the Above) – Director: BILL+; in peace (from healism) – Director: Chen-Hao Yin; I'm a Fucking Mad Dog, Dope! Ft. BAT (from GOLDEN TAIZI BRO) – Director: Tomas Lin; DEATH TRIP (from DEATH TRIP) – Directors: ØZI, BÄMBOO LEE	
Vocal category – Individual awards
Best Composition	Best Lyrics
"Shadow Song" (from Shadow Song) – HUSH (Performer: HUSH); "If you forget me" (from Be Nothing) – XiaoYu Sung (Performer: Xiao Yu); "Bluebirds" (from DEPART) – Tanya Chua (Performer: Tanya Chua); "uWEATHER" (from healism) – Crowd Lu (Performer: Crowd Lu); "Aroma" (from HAVE A NICE DAY) – suwoojunga (Performer: waa wei, sunwoojunga); "Greediness" (from How Come I Still Remember All) – Eve Ai (Performer: Eve Ai)	"88BARS" (from 88BARS) – Xinkuan Xiong (Performer: Kumachan); "Measure (from Today is a Wild Horse) – Lo Sirong (Performer: Lo Sirong); "Into The Wild (from DEPART) – Chow-Yiu-Fai (Performer: Tanya Chua); "Qu Er Lian Hao Te De Ye Che" (from Li Chun) – Bobby Chen (Performer: Bobby Chen); "Jiao Rao" (from Stage) – Wu Hsiung (Performer: Ricky Hsiao); "Someone" (from Someone) – David Ke (Performer: waa wei)
Best Music Arrangement	Producer of the Year, Album
Star (from《N1》Nanguaq No.1) – Huang, Shao-Yong (Performer: Natsuko); "Mountain Of Doom" (from Mountain of Doom) – Ayugo Huang (Performer: Ayugo Huang and Sangpuy); "Saturday" (from Road to...) – Sonic Deadhorse, I-Shuo Lin and Dee Chen (Performer: Lilium); "Crazy Disco" (from healism) – Crowd Lu, Shao-Yong Huang, Achino Chang, Dawson Chien and MCKY (Performer: Crowd Lu); "My Heart Is Plastic" (from My Heart Is Plastic) – Robot Swing (Performer: Robot Swing, Chen, Yi-Heng and Pei-Yu Hung); "PARADIGM" (from BEANSTALK) – YELLOW (Performer: YELLOW)	AI-CHING – Jerry Li (Performer: Jerry Li); FAC:E – Everydaze (Performer: Wang Hui-chu); Mountain Of Doom – Ayugo Huang (Performer: Ayugo Huang); Road to... – Sonic Deadhorse (Performer: Lilium); DEPART – Tanya Chua (Performer: Tanya Chua); HAVE A NICE DAY – George Chen, HLK, Huang, Shao-Yong
Producer of the Year, Single	Best New Artist
"None of the Above" (from None of the Above) – LaLa Hsu, Howe (Performer: LaLa Hsu); "rong xue" (from Faye, Wen Ting Zhan zai yun cai shang tiao wu ji ji zha zha) – Faye and Luming Lu (Performer: Faye); "Sally" (from Longing) – Chia-Lun Yue (Performer: Ilid Kaolo); "My Heart Is Plastic" (from My Heart Is Plastic) – Howe Chen, HLK, Ziya Huang (Performed: Robot Swing, Chen, Yi-Heng, Pei-Yu Hung); "Empty World" (from Empty World) – Arai Soichiro, Fei Peng／Empty World (Performed: Karen Mok); "Oh Love, You Are Much Greater Than I Imagined" (from Oh Love, You Are Much Greater Than I Imagined) – Wei-Yu Chung (Performer: EggPlantEgg); "DEATH TRIP" (from DEATH TRIP) – ØZI, Soft Lipa, Ian Jeffrey Thomas (Performer: ØZI feat. Soft Lipa)	MEmento⋅MORI – Collage; Iā-Kuan Sûn-Tiûnn – Tsng-Kha-Lâng; Dive & Give – L8ching; Where Are We Now – Modern Cinema Master; Greg Han – Greg Han; Fresh Soul – Matt Lv; LOVE MAZE – Haezee
Best Female Mandarin Singer	Best Male Mandarin Singer
DEPART – Tanya Chua; 99% Angel – Karencici; Faye, Wen Ting Zhan Zai Yun Cai Shang Tiao Wu Ji Ji Zha Zha – Faye; Longing – Ilid Kaolo; HAVE A NICE DAY – waa wei; ONCE UPON A MOON – Tia Ray (Yuan Ya Wei)	A Flying Dog – Cui Jian; healism – Crowd Lu; Dreams Company – Xu Jun; BEANSTALK – YELLOW; Mama Jeans And Daddy Shoes – Ma Nien-hsien; The Last Aquarium – Jude Chiu
Best Female Singer (Taiwanese)	Best Male Singer (Taiwanese)
Kuu – Joey Chiang; A Correct Answer – Angel Chu; Love Is Not A Sin – Huiru Lai; Wu Shuan – Huang Fei; Second Half – Hanya Chang	Don't Know – Wang Jun Jie; Stage – Ricky Hsiao; Dare Or Not – Justin Su; Captain Taiwan – Dwagie; Sunset – Chang Wu
Best Singer (Indigenous Language)	Best Singer (Hakka)
To Wait In Silence – Osay Hongay; pongso no Tao – Paudull; The Girl On The Grapevine – Usay Kawlu; Chanter – Suming ⋅ Rupi; I Thought I Didn't Know – Karekelj	Mountain Of Doom – Ayugo Huang; Gien Dan Mo Gien Dan – A May; Return To Reality – Huang Yu Han; Hsieh-Yu-Wei Band [Rain Is Falling Again] – Hsieh, Yu-Wei; 00 – Kung Ta
Best Band	Best Vocal Group
GOLDEN TAIZI BRO – Flesh Juicer (GIGO, Matt, ZERO, Evan, sionC); Into Innerverse – I Mean Us; UNDO – Wild Thing; Paramount – Amazing Show; No Mercy – No-Nonsense Collective; Holy Trip! – TRASH; One that reminds me of you – Undecimber Fin.	Jian Jian Hua – New Formosa Band; Pat-Sian – Sam-seng-hiàn-gē; Because of Love – Power Station; The Great Beyond – VH (Vast & Hazy); TAKE A BREATH – Shadow Project; Millions of Years Apart – The Dinosaur's Skin (Triceratops, Trex)
Instrumental category – Record label awards
Best Instrumental Album	
Increasing Echo (Original Soundtrack) – Chris Hou; The Poem For All Being – Chill Qin; Forty-Three – Stacey Wei; Between Now and Never – Invisible Architecture; ON – Musa	
Instrumental category – Individual awards
Best Instrumental Album Producer	Best Instrumental Producer
Between Now And Never – Alan Kwan, Jordan Gheen, Matt Young; City Silhouette – Jazzy Su, Richard Li; Fusion World – Siou-Shen Lin; City's Whispering – Wu Judy Chin-tai; ON – Jay Chang and Martin Musaubach	"On Starboard" (from Hydro Canvas) – YongHeng Wu; "Hit the Gym!" (from City Silhouette) – Jazzy Su; "Boulevard Anspach" (from Paralles) – Liu-Ting Chiu; "Raga Shuddha Sarang" (from Yü) – Ken Ohtake; "Pulse" (from Between Now And Never) – Alan Kwan, Jordan Gheen, Matt Young
Technical category – Individual awards
Best Album Design	
Road to... – Chen Nien-Ying; Mountain of Doom – Yueh Yueh Liu; HAVE A NICE DAY – Echo Yang; Ghosician – Saw Rui-Wen; THE WIND OF XINGANG – Aron Nieh	
Technical category – Record label awards
Best Album Recording	Best Instrumental Album Recording
DEPART –(Recording Engineers: Tanya Chua, Ni, Han-Wen, Wu, Yu-Chang, Khoi Huynh; Main Mixing Engineers: Leonard Fong, Ricky Ho, Joe Grasso, Richard Furch; Main Mastering Post-Production: John Greenham); 99% Angel –(Recording Engineer: kvn; Main Mixing Engineer: Daniela Rivera; Main Mastering Post-Production: Johnny Horesco); BEANSTALK –(Recording Engineers: Chou-Han Tsay, Wei Ming Shan Main; Mixing Engineers: Chou-Han Tsay, Wei Ming Shan; Main Mastering Post-Production: Jeff Lipton); ONCE UPON A MOON –(Recording Engineers: Li-Wen Wu, TIA RAY, Hui-Lin Yang; Main Mixing Engineers: Tian-Che Zhou, Jon Rezin; Main Mastering Post-Production: Tian-Che Zhou, Jon Rezin); A Flying Dog –(Recording Engineers: Wang Zheng, Yan, Zhong-Kun; Main Mixing Engineers: Cui Jian, Wang Zheng; Main Mastering Post-Production: Adam Ayan)	Hydro Canvas –(Recording Engineers: You Li, Yang Li; Main Mixing Engineers: You Li, YongHeng Wu; Main Mastering Post-Production: You Li, YongHeng Wu); Crossing Paralles –(Recording Engineer: Szu-Pei su; Main Mixing Engineer: Tommy Cavalieri; Main Mastering Post-Production: Tommy Cavalieri); Fusion World –(Recording Engineer: Hendrik Pan; Main Mixing Engineer: Evan Hsieh; Main Mastering Post-Production: Sangwook Nam); Yü –(Recording Engineer: Liu Yihung; Main Mixing Engineer: Wolfgang Obrecht; Main Mastering Post-Production: Wolfgang Obrecht); Between Now And Never –(Recording Engineers: Alan Kwan, Jordan Gheen, Matt Young; Main Mixing Engineers: Alan Kwan, Jordan Gheen, Matt Young; Main Mastering Post-Production: Alan Kwan, Jordan Gheen, Matt Young)
Special Contribution Award
Chiu Chen	Fu Ming Chen
Jury Award
Mountain of Doom – Ayugo Huang
