= Oh Love, You Are Much Greater Than I Imagined =

Single by EggPlantEgg
- Language: Taiwanese
- English title: Oh Love, You Are Much Greater Than I Imagined
- Released: March 15, 2021
- Studio: 89 studio
- Genre: Electronic; Disco; Rock
- Length: 3:52
- Songwriter: Ng Ki-pin (黃奇斌)
- Producer: Chung Weiyu (鍾濰宇)

EggPlantEgg singles chronology
"新年恭喜薯來堡" (2021)	"Oh Love, You Are Much Greater Than I Imagined" (2021)	"Love You One More Time" (2021)

Music video
- Oh Love, You Are Much Greater Than I Imagined on YouTube

"Oh Love, You Are Much Greater Than I Imagined" (Chinese: 愛情你比我想的閣較偉大; Pe̍h-ōe-jī: Ài-chêng lí pí góa siūⁿ ê koh-khah úi-tāi) is a song written by Taiwanese independent band EggPlantEgg for the film Man In Love, released independently on March 15, 2021. This is also the first time EggPlantEgg composed a movie theme song. The song's melody simulates the electronic dance music style of the 1990s, with a fast-paced arrangement and strong heavy beat, echoing the bombastic love of the film's main character.

Due to the high box office of Man in Love in Taiwan, the song was very popular after its release, winning the No.1 spot in Taiwan KKBOX Mandarin and Taiwanese Weekly Chart, No.1 spot in Chinese and Taiwanese Yearly Chart in 2021, and No.1 spot in the 33rd Golden Melody Award for Song of the Year.

== Background and Release ==
Man In Love is the first feature-length film of director Yin Chen-hao. The film tells the story of a debt collector, Ah Cheng (played by Roy Chiu), who falls in love with a poor girl, Hao Ting (actor: Hsu Wei Ning). Yin had previously directed many of EggplantEgg's music videos, including "Back Here Again" (浪子回頭), "Waves Wandering" (浪流連), and All That Wishful Thinking (這款自作多情), which have been dubbed as the "Prodigal Son Universe Trilogy" due to their coherent plots. Man In Love (當男人戀愛時)" is an extension of "Prodigal Son Universe". In the past, when Yin Chen-hao and EggPlantEgg collaborated, Yin would listen to the song first and then construct the music video through the music's mood. However, this time, he only showed EggPlantEgg the movie's script and stills, and then he said "Go for it", and the band members created the theme song according to the storyline.

At first, Ng Ki-pin made a wobbly, distorted piano sound, and then hit the drums beat by beat. During the songwriting process, he said that he kept putting himself into the movie's plot, and even became one with the main character. After the lyrics were finished, the three members of the band went into arranging the song. Guitarist Yaode Hsieh (謝耀德), who is responsible for stacking up the rhythm of the song, said that this song is their fastest and heaviest work, which creates a feeling of speeding up. Guitarist Kai Ren Tsai (蔡鎧任) who played the guitar solo, shared, "When I was writing the song, I had the intuition that most men who fall in love are very straightforward and confrontational, so when I was arranging the guitars, I thought that I would play a thicker sound, and confess my love in a way that is a little bit rogue and overbearing," said Tsai.

The song took half a year to create, and Eggplant Egg chose March 14, White Valentine's Day at 13:14 (from the Mandarin harmony: whole life) to upload the music video of 'Oh Love, You Are Much Greater Than I Imagined' to YouTube, and attended the press conference of the theme song on the same day, and the sound source was uploaded to all major music platforms on the next day.

== Creation and Recording ==
The song was arranged by the three members of EggPlantEgg, with lyrics written in Taiwanese by vocalist Ng Ki-pin. The lyrics are about the protagonist Ah Cheng's new quest for love in the movie, and the last line of the song, "愛你愛甲白目眉" means "I will love you until we grow old," (lit. 'I will love you until your eyebrows turn white') which is what lead singer Ng Ki-pin thought of intuitively after watching the movie script. The word "閣較" in the song's title means "more" in Taiwanese (Taiwanese: Koh-khah).

The song is written in the key of A minor, with a tempo of 150 beats per minute and a total length of 3 minutes and 52 seconds. According to Ng Ki-pin, the song is inspired by the 1990s style in which the three members were born. The drum arrangement mimics the electronic feel of the past, the bass part tries to be a dance-like heavy beat, and the synthesizer picks a trendy sound, just like the story of the movie's main character, Ah Cheng, who falls into love in a hurry.

== Music video ==
As of December 2021, the music video has been viewed more than 33.49 million times on YouTube, and on December 1, 2021, the music video won the top spot on YouTube's Hot Music Videos of Taiwan 2021 chart, making it the first Taiwanese song music video to win the top spot.

== Commercial success ==
After its release, the song won the No. 1 spot on both the Mandarin and Taiwanese KKBOX New Songs and Singles Charts, as well as the No. 1 spot on the Chinese and Taiwanese Singles Chart of the Year. It also topped both the Mandarin and Taiwanese Singles Charts. On the Taiwanese Singles Chart, it has been on the charts for 20 weeks.

On radio, the song peaked at No.5 on the Hit FM Chinese Chart in its first week of release, and peaked at No.4 the following week for a total of 8 weeks on the chart.

Towards the end of 2021, all the major online music platforms announced their most listened to songs of the year, and the song won the 3rd place on Apple Music and the 2nd place on Spotify.

== Awards ==
The song was shortlisted for Best Original Song in a Movie at the 58th Golden Horse Awards, but lost out to the theme song "I'm the One", written and sung by Eve AI for the movie The Love I Didn't Talk About. In 2022, the song won the Song of the Year Award at the 33th Golden Melody Awards.

== Live performance ==
On March 27, 2021, Eggplant performed the song "Oh Love, You Are Much Greater Than I Imagined" live for the first time as the grand finale of the Megaport Festival, and on November 27, Eggplant performed the song at the 58th Golden Horse Awards ceremony. On December 11 of the same year, Eggplant was the opening act for the Christmas Town Concert in New Taipei City and opened the concert with the song. On January 1, 2022, Eggplant performed the song at the New Year's Eve event in Taipei City.

== Behind the Scenes ==
The following is an excerpt from the song's music video caption on YouTube

Recording Studio

- Main Recording Studio - 89 studio
- Drum Recording Studio - Lights Up Studio
- Mixing studio - Rave Sound Studio
- Mastering and post-processing studio - Rave Sound Studio

Producers

- Keyboards/Synthesizers - Huang Qibin
- Guitars/Harmonies - CAYU-REN CHAI, YAODE XIE
- Drums - Pan Weihan
- Main Recording Engineer - Weiyu Zhong
- Drum Recordist - John Tsai
- Drum Recording Assistant - Yu Shizheng
- Vocal Editor - Yau King Tong
- Mixing Engineer - Zhou Weidun
- Mastering Engineer - Zhou Wooden
