= Osnrap =

#osnrap

Studio album by OSN
- Released: 30 April 2019
- Genre: Mandopop, hip hop, rap
- Length: 31:14
- Label: SKR Presents

#osnrap is the debut studio album of Taiwanese rapper and singer OSN. It was released on 30 April 2019 by SKR Presents and contains a total of 10 tracks. The title of the album refers to the hashtag he use in his Instagram posts to share his music. His single "Without You" was the second most viewed Mandopop music video on YouTube in 2019.

== Track listing ==
All tracks are written by OSN.

No.	Title	Length
1.	"Without You"	2:55
2.	"Runaway"	3:29
3.	"Why You Gonna Lie"	2:54
4.	"The Last Time (最後一次)"	2:46
5.	"Be Alright"	3:22
6.	"Everybody Bounce"	2:40
7.	"Benz Booty (featuring SOWUT)"	2:34
8.	"No Play"	3:09
9.	"Old Me"	3:59
10.	"Without You (Acoustic Version) [featuring Vicky Chen]"	3:24
Total length:		31:14

== Music videos ==
Song	Director	Release date	Link
Everybody Bounce	Lu Xiaohou (呂小猴)	13 October 2018	MV
Be Alright	Kaley Emerson (孫凱盛)	16 November 2018	MV
Benz Booty (feat. SOWUT)		4 January 2019	MV
Why You Gonna Lie	Alex Kao (高爾賢)	1 February 2019	MV
The Last Time (最後一次)	Kaley Emerson (孫凱盛)	8 March 2019	MV
Without You	Alex Kao (高爾賢)	1 April 2019	MV
Runaway	Chensport (陳昱辰)	30 April 2019	MV
Old Me	Kaley Emerson (孫凱盛)	1 July 2019	MV
Without You (Acoustic Version) [feat. Vicky Chen]	Chensport (陳昱辰)	19 August 2019	MV

== Awards and nominations ==
Year	Ceremony	Award	Nominated work	Result	Notes
2019	Mnet Asian Music Awards	Best New Asian Artist Mandarin	—	Won	
2020	31st Golden Melody Awards	Song of the Year	"Without You"	Nominated	
2020	31st Golden Melody Awards	Best New Vocal	—	Nominated	
