= Li Jia Wei =

Li Jia Wei is a human name, may refer to:

- Li Jiawei
- Jess Lee
- Kevin Li
- Siri Lee
