= 31st Golden Melody Awards =

Taiwan music awards ceremony in 2020

- Date: October 3, 2020 (Popular music)
- Venue: Taipei Music Center (Popular music)
- Country: Taiwan
- Hosted by: Waa Wei
- Website: gma.tavis.tw/gm31/index.htm

Television/radio coverage
- Network: TTV

The 31st Golden Melody Awards (Chinese: 第31屆金曲獎) took place in Taipei, Taiwan in 2020. The ceremony was scheduled for 27 June 2020, but rescheduled to 3 October, due to the COVID-19 pandemic, and moved to the Taipei Music Center.

== Winners and nominees ==
Below is the list of winners and nominees for the popular music categories.

Vocal category – Record label awards
Album of the Year	Song of the Year
Kinakaian MOTHER TONGUE – ABAO; Love is Calling Me – Joanna Wang; City Zoo – G.E.M.; Hypnocity – Peggy Hsu; Juvenile A – Sandee Chan; Hidden, Not Forgotten – Waa Wei; Spaceman – Wu Tsing-fong; Makeover – Loh Tsui Kweh Commune; We all have good nature – Justin Su; Reflection – Michelle Pan; We Are Gonnna Get Married – EggPlantEgg; Burnana – Lilium; Stand Up Like A Taiwanese – Fire EX.; Yourself – Yachun Asta Tzeng; THE SHIP OF FOOLS – Misa; Going Up To The Country – Zixuan & Slow Train; Someday – Huang Yu Han; Sasela'an – Ado; Diligent Life – Anu Kaliting Sadipongan; Insides Revealed – Sauljaljui; Salama – Chalaw Basiwali	"Thank You" (from kinakaian MOTHER TONGUE) – ABAO; "Airplane Mode" (from Beyond Mediocrity) – 9m88 and Leo Wang; "Distant Journey" (from a Sun original Soundtrack) – Lin Sheng Xiang; "Without You" (from #osnrap) – OSN; "City Zoo" (from City Zoo) – G.E.M.; "Ghost Island" (from Calling Asia) – Namewee and Dwagie; "City of Sadness" (from Stand Up Like A Taiwanese) – Fire EX.
Best Mandarin Album	Best Taiwanese Album
Love is Calling Me – Joanna Wang; City Zoo – G.E.M.; Hypnocity – Peggy Hsu; Juvenile A – Sandee Chan; Hidden, Not Forgotten – Waa Wei; Spaceman – Wu Tsing-fong	Makeover – Loh Tsui Kweh Commune; We all have good nature – Justin Su; Reflection – Michelle Pan; We Are Gonnna Get Married – EggPlantEgg; Burnana – Lilium; Stand Up Like A Taiwanese – Fire EX.
Best Hakka Album	Best Aboriginal Album
THE SHIP OF FOOLS – Misa; Yourself – Yachun Asta Tzeng; Going Up To The Country – Zixuan & Slow Train; Someday – Huang Yu Han	kinakaian MOTHER TONGUE – ABAO; Sasela'an – Ado; Diligent Life – Anu Kaliting Sadipongan; Insides Revealed – Sauljaljui; Salama – Chalaw Basiwali
Best Music Video	
"LOVE" (from Somewhere in time, I love you.) – Director: Yin Chen-hao; "Last Winter" (from Last Winter) – Director: Hi-Organic; "Lady In Red" (from Ugly Beauty) – Director: Cheng Wei Hao; "Only Care About You" (from Love is Calling Me) – Robert Youngblood; "Be There for You" (from Hidden, Not Forgotten) – Director: Yao Kuo Chen; "Uncanny Valley" (from Juvenile A) – Director: Sandee Chan	
Vocal category – Individual awards
Best Female Mandarin Singer	Best Male Mandarin Singer
Hidden, Not Forgotten – Waa Wei; Love is Calling Me – Joanna Wang; The Sun Also Rises – Fish Leong; City Zoo – G.E.M.; Hypnocity – Peggy Hsu; Faith Yang - The More Beautiful, The More Invisible	Spaceman – Wu Tsing-fong; The Younger Me – Wakin Chau; THE ALLEY – J.Sheon; Gone Away – Ayal Komod; Calling Asia – Namewee; Flee From The Ceremony - Jude Chiu
Best Female Taiwanese Singer	Best Male Taiwanese Singer
Blooming – Angel Chu; U-KAU-NIAU – Tien Du; Reflection – Michelle Pan; Live On Air – Anna Wang; Cherish our Pain – Hanya Chang	We all have good nature – Justin Su; Long Distance Relationship – Fang Shunji; When I Find My Heart Inside You – Yi Heng Chen; M-THANG – Kuljelje Salevelev; Floating Flowers in the Wind - Wu Yung-Chi
Best Aboriginal Singer	Best Hakka Singer
Ceko Tribute to Falangaw – Ceko; Sasela'an – Ado; Diligent Life – Anu Kaliting Sadipongan; Insides Revealed – Sauljaljui; Kinakaian MOTHER TONGUE – ABAO	THE SHIP OF FOOLS – Misa; Alongside the Road – Liu Jung-Chang; Twine and Linger – Pei-Shu Huang; Someday – Huang Yu Han
Best Vocal Group	Best New Artist
Beat Maker – Chick en Chicks; Nemo – JADE; 1+1<3 – MURMURSHOW; SUGARCAT – SUGARCAT; Group Pillow Talk Concept EP – Night Keepers	The Elephant in The Room – Chih Siou; Beyond Mediocrity – 9m88; Nemo – JADE; #osnrap – OSN; Somewhere in time, I love you. – Accusefive; FANTASIA – Goat; Bad Midi – Midi Yang
Best Composition	Best Lyrics
"The Wedding feat.Luantan Ascent" (from Jen Jen) – Jen Jen (Performer: Jen Jen); "Distant Journey" (from a Sun original Soundtrack) – Lin Sheng Xiang (Performer: Lin Sheng Xiang); "City Zoo" (from City Zoo) – G.E.M. (Performer: G.E.M.); "Thank You" (from Kinakaian MOTHER TONGUE) – ABAO and Dizparity (Performer: ABAO); "Spaceman" (from Spaceman) – Wu Tsing-fong (Performer: Wu Tsing-fong)	"Road" (from Road) – Hsieh Ming-yu (Performer: Hsieh Ming-yu); "If I were a Tree" (from THE SHIP OF FOOLS) – Misa (Performer: Misa); "Ta De Mei Yi Tian" (from SevenDays) – Bobby Chen (Performer: Bobby Chen); "Be An Extraordinary Ordinary Person" (from Juvenile A) – Sandee Chan and Trout Fresh (Performer: Sandee Chan and Trout Fresh); "Ophelia" (from Hidden, Not Forgotten) – Katie Lee (Performer: Waa Wei); "ONE TO TEN ft. Dizparity" (from Kinakaian MOTHER TONGUE) – ABAO and Ayzin (Performer: ABAO)
Best Music Arrangement	Producer of the Year, Album
"Ikusa" (from Hypnocity) – KOBUDO (Performer: Peggy Hsu); "Ballad" (from THE ALLEY) – RAZOR (Performer: J.Sheon); "Blues in the Rain" (from Love is Calling Me) – Ryan Francesconi (Performer: Joanna Wang); "cemavulid" (from Insides Revealed) – Tseng Jen-yi, Hung Tzu-lung, Dakung, Sauljaljui (Performer: Sauljaljui); "MOTHER TONGUE" (from Kinakaian MOTHER TONGUE) – Dizparity (Performer: ABAO)	Juvenile A – Sandee Chan (Performer: Sandee Chan); Hypnocity – Owen Wang and Peggy Hsu (Performer: Peggy Hsu); Hidden, Not Forgotten – George Chen (Performer: Waa Wei); Kinakaian MOTHER TONGUE – Huang Shao Yong and ABAO (Performer: ABAO); Stand Up Like A Taiwanese – Mike Green and Fire EX. (Performer: Fire EX.)
Producer of the Year, Single	Best Band
"Road" (from Road) – Ming-Yo Hsieh (Performer: Ming-Yo Hsieh); "Airplane Mode" (from Beyond Mediocrity) – Soft Lipa (Performer: 9m88); "Y.O.Y (feat. Chili)" (from Dark Paradise Records J7 White Diamonds) – Howe Chicken (Performer: Howe Chicken and Chili); "fly" (from fly) – Jason Choi (Performer: YoYo Sham); "Murmur" (from Murmur) – Xiaoyu Sung (Performer: Xiaoyu Sung); "Once In A Blue Moon" (from CIRCUS FEVER) – Chia-Lun Yue and YELLOW (Performer: YELLOW and Mavis Fan)	Stand Up Like A Taiwanese – Fire EX.; Never Die – TRASH; Somewhere in time, I love you. – Accusefive; Call me when Night go Blue – Iruka Porisu; We Are Gonnna Get Married – EggPlantEgg; The art of embarrassment - Wayne's so sad; Existing like God - ZenKwun
Instrumental category – Record label awards
Best Instrumental Album	
Ciao Bella – Shen Yu Su, Tseng Yi Tseng, Kuan Liang Lin; Petrichor – Alan Kwan, Fabian Almaza, Linda May Oh, Johnathan Blake; Baby-C Portfolio Initial Value – Baby-C; Ken – Ken Ohtake; Detention (Original Motion Picture Soundtrack) – Lu Luming	
Instrumental category – Individual awards
Best Instrumental Album Producer	Best Instrumental Composer
Non-Confined Space – Flow, Gesture, and Spaces; Petrichor – Alan Kwan; Mugen – Sakamoto; Hiking in the Mist – Jesy Chiang; Baby-C Portfolio Initial Value – Baby-C	"Okinawa" (from Ken) – Ken Ohtake; "When Will I See You Again?" (from Petrichor) – Alan Kwan; "Non-Confined Space" (from Flow, Gesture, and Spaces) – Non-Confined Space; "Initial Value" (from Baby-C Portfolio Initial Value) – Baby-C; "Ciao Bella" (from Ciao Bella) – Shen Yu Su
Technical category – Individual awards
Best Recording Package	
Awakening – Timonium Lake; Somewhere in time, I love you. – Yen Po Chun; Chicken Lunch Box – Godkidlla; We Are Gonnna Get Married – FKWU; BJ4 – FKWU and Chien Ying Tseng	
Technical category – Record label awards
Best Vocal Recording Album	Best Instrumental Recording Album
The Younger Me – Recording Engineers: Wilson Teng, Zach Hung Main Mixing Engineers: Jerry Lin, Keller Wang Main Mastering Post-Production; M.T. Sun; One of Two – Recording Engineers: Colate Huang, Shizoku Lin Main Mixing Engineers: Dave Yang Main Mastering Post-Production: Dave Yang; Hypnocity – Recording Engineers: Peggy Hsu, Shang-Po Lin, Hsing Tso, Lugia Su, Toshiyasu Shiozawa/ Main Mixing Engineers: Ziya Huang Main Mastering Post-Production: Randy Merrill; Toliara – Recording Engineers: Mario Karpinsky, Danial Casas Main Mixing Engineers: Carlos Maria Vera Del Moral Main Mastering Post-Production: Carlos Maria Vera Del Moral; BJ4 – Recording Engineers: Chief Wang Main Mixing Engineers: Dan Korneff Main Mastering Post-Production: Ted Jenson	Baby-C Portfolio Initial Value – Recording Engineers: YuSong Li, David Wang Main Mixing Engineers: Baby-C Main Mastering Post-Production: Bernie Grundman; West 17th Street, New York City – Recording Engineers: WeiSheng Lin, Lou Rainone, Seiji Ochiai, Kenji Omae Main Mixing Engineers: Peter Karl Main Mastering Post-Production: Peter Karl; Somewhere In The Middle – Recording Engineers: Zen Chien Main Mixing Engineers: Zen Chien Main Mastering Post-Production: Scott Hull; A voice in the Chaos – Recording Engineers: Dakung Main Mixing Engineers: Dakung Main Mastering Post-Production: Dakung; Detention (Original Motion Picture Soundtrack) – Recording Engineers: Zen Chien Main Mixing Engineers: Zen Chien Main Mastering Post-Production: Zen Chien
Special Contribution Award
Rich Huang
Jury Award
City Zoo – G.E.M.
