= Yen and Ai-Lee =

2024 Taiwanese film by Tom Lin

- Promotional poster
- Traditional Chinese: 小雁與吳愛麗
- Hanyu Pinyin: Xiǎoyàn yǔ Wú Àilì
- Directed by: Tom Lin Shu-yu
- Written by: Tom Lin Shu-yu
- Produced by: Clifford Miu; Zhang Lin-han
- Starring: Kimi Hsia; Yang Kuei-mei; Sam Tseng; Ng Ki-pin
- Cinematography: Kartik Vijay
- Edited by: Tom Lin Hsin-ming
- Music by: Masaki Hayashi
- Production company: Bering Pictures
- Distributed by: Activator Co.
- Release dates: 5 October 2024 (BIFF); 10 October 2024 (Taiwan)
- Running time: 107 minutes
- Country: Taiwan
- Languages: Mandarin; Hakka

Yen and Ai-Lee (Chinese: 小雁與吳愛麗) is a 2024 Taiwanese drama film directed and written by Tom Lin Shu-yu. Starring Kimi Hsia, Yang Kuei-mei, Sam Tseng, and Ng Ki-pin, the film explores themes of domestic violence and follows the reconciliation between a young woman (Hsia), who murders her abusive father, and her mother (Yang).

Marking his fifth feature film, director-screenwriter Tom Lin Shu-yu conceived the project to collaborate with his wife Kimi Hsia, with the protagonist's character arc basing on Hsia's real life experiences. Lin began writing the screenplay in 2022 and production began in 2023, primarily filming in Kaohsiung and shot entirely in black-and-white.

The film had its world premiere in competition at the 29th Busan International Film Festival on 5 October 2024, where it won the Kim Jiseok Award, making it the first Taiwanese film to win in this category. It was then release theatrically in Taiwan on 10 October. The film received eight nominations in the 61st Golden Horse Awards, with Yang Kuei-mei winning Best Supporting Actress.

== Plot ==
The film begins in Meinong with a long take of Yen soaking in blood as she cycles to a police station to turn herself in after murdering her abusive father to protect her mother Ai-Lee. Eight years later, Yen is released from prison and returns to a new house where her mother welcomes her and shows her the new bedroom. She then meets her mother's new boyfriend, Ren, a rude local thug whom Yen immediately despises. A young woman (who looks identical to Yen) attends a drama class at a community college and introduces herself as Allie. Befriending some classmates, she learns that their drama teacher's real job is as a "filial piety daughter", actresses hired by families to mourn at funerals. Allie excels in her class and gains confidence through her performances.

Yen is contacted by a woman claiming to be her deceased father's mistress, who urges her to take care of her younger half-brother, Wei, as she must leave town for a month. Although Yen refuses, the woman leaves Wei outside Ai-Lee's grocery store. Yen initially drives Wei back and leaves him outside his home, but feeling pity for the boy, she returns and takes him to the house of Cheng, a former classmate she has recently reunited with, asking Cheng to care for him. Although Cheng agrees, his father is dissatisfied and asks Yen to take the boy away as soon as possible. From uncollected letters left outside the mistress's home, Yen discovers the woman used to work at a community college and tries to inquire about her there, only to find out she resigned over a month ago. While leaving, Yen is drawn to a drama class advertisement. Although reluctantly, Yen begins to bond with Wei while caring for him.

A month passes, and Ren brings his friends to Ai-Lee's grocery store. He takes some scratchcards hidden inside a cabinet, claiming that those are real while the ones in the cupboards are fake. Yen confronts Ai-Lee, asking why she sells fake scratchcards. Ai-Lee claims this is to make money and insists she is not wrong, instead blaming Yen for ruining their family. Angered, Yen packs her things and leaves home. Wei refuses to go with her, believing his mother will come to pick him up the next day since it marks a full month. When Wei's mother does not show up, the boy finally realizes that she has abandoned him. Unwillingly, Ai-Lee feels sorry for Wei and begins to take care of him. Meanwhile, Yen moves to Kaohsiung and finds a job at a laundry factory. She changes her appearance from a rural girl to a city girl, restyling her hair which resembles Allie's, revealing that they are the same person.

Ren arrives at the grocery store and discovers that Ai-Lee has stopped selling fake scratchcards. He threatens Ai-Lee to continue selling them, but she firmly refuses and slaps him. Triggered, Ren tries to kill Ai-Lee, and is only stopped by a passing policeman. Meanwhile, in the drama class, students are randomly assigned costumes and must perform accordingly. Allie is assigned a white mourning cloth. Initially wanting to refuse, she is encouraged by the teacher and continues to perform. Allie soon becomes overwhelmed with emotion, imagining herself talking to her deceased father at the funeral and expressing that she does not want to hate him or her mother but does not know how to move on without the hatred. After this emotional performance, she finally finds peace within herself and reveals her real name, Yen, to the teacher.

Upon learning her mother is at the police station, Yen returns to Meinong and bails her. At last, Ai-Lee tells Yen that Ren has moved out, revealing that she stood up to him in hopes of bringing her back home, while Yen finally dares to discuss her father with Ai-Lee.

== Cast ==
- Kimi Hsia as:
  - Yen, a woman recently released from prison after murdering her abusive father
  - Allie, a young community college drama student
- Yang Kuei-mei as Ai-Lee, Yen's mother who suffers from domestic violence
- Sam Tseng as Ren, Ai-Lee's new abusive boyfriend
- Ng Ki-pin as Cheng, a fried chicken hawker who secretly loves Yen

Also starring in the film are Hsieh I-le as Wei, Yen's younger half-brother; Winnie Chang as Linda, Allie's drama teacher and funeral-mourning actress; Elsie Yeh as Lee Ya-wen, the mistress of Yen's deceased father and the mother of Wei; and Chang Chieh as Ko, a primary school teacher and Allie's drama classmate.

== Production ==
=== Development ===
Director-screenwriter Tom Lin Shu-yu had intended to collaborate with his wife and actress Kimi Hsia on a film project and conceived Yen and Ai-Lee for years, but did not have the time or opportunity to develop the idea until the early days of the COVID-19 pandemic. Lin based the protagonist on Hsia and came up with a plot to explore the mother-daughter relationship, a topic he credited as one of Hsia's interests, but found it challenging to write a mother-daughter story since he had never experienced both identities. His inspiration came when he read a news story about a son who murdered his father to protect his mother and was labeled "filial" by the press, prompting him to write the story by switching the son to a daughter in an abusive relationship. Lin took more than a year to conceive of the story, and began writing the screenplay in 2022 after producing American Girl (2021), ultimately winning the Excellent Screenplay Award in the 44th Golden Harvest Awards in November 2022. Yen and Ai-Lee is Lin's first original screenplay, and Hsia contributed to fine-tuning it, as well as to pre-production and casting, describing the film as "a project between the couple" and marking their first collaboration. Lin also helmed the project as director, marking his fifth feature film. He envisioned shooting the film in black-and-white from the scriptwriting stage, and offered to reduce his salary while pitching the film to investors, acknowledging the typical lack of box office revenue for black-and-white films. The dual roles played by Hsia were not intended to be combined as one in his original concept. He imagined the lead character as having two identities, an ex-convict and an acting understudy, with their traits drawn from Hsia's real-life experiences, including her relationship with her mother. The drama lesson scenes were inspired by Hsia's transition from hosting the variety show Stylish Man - The Chef (2008-2017) to taking acting classes to become a full-time actress.

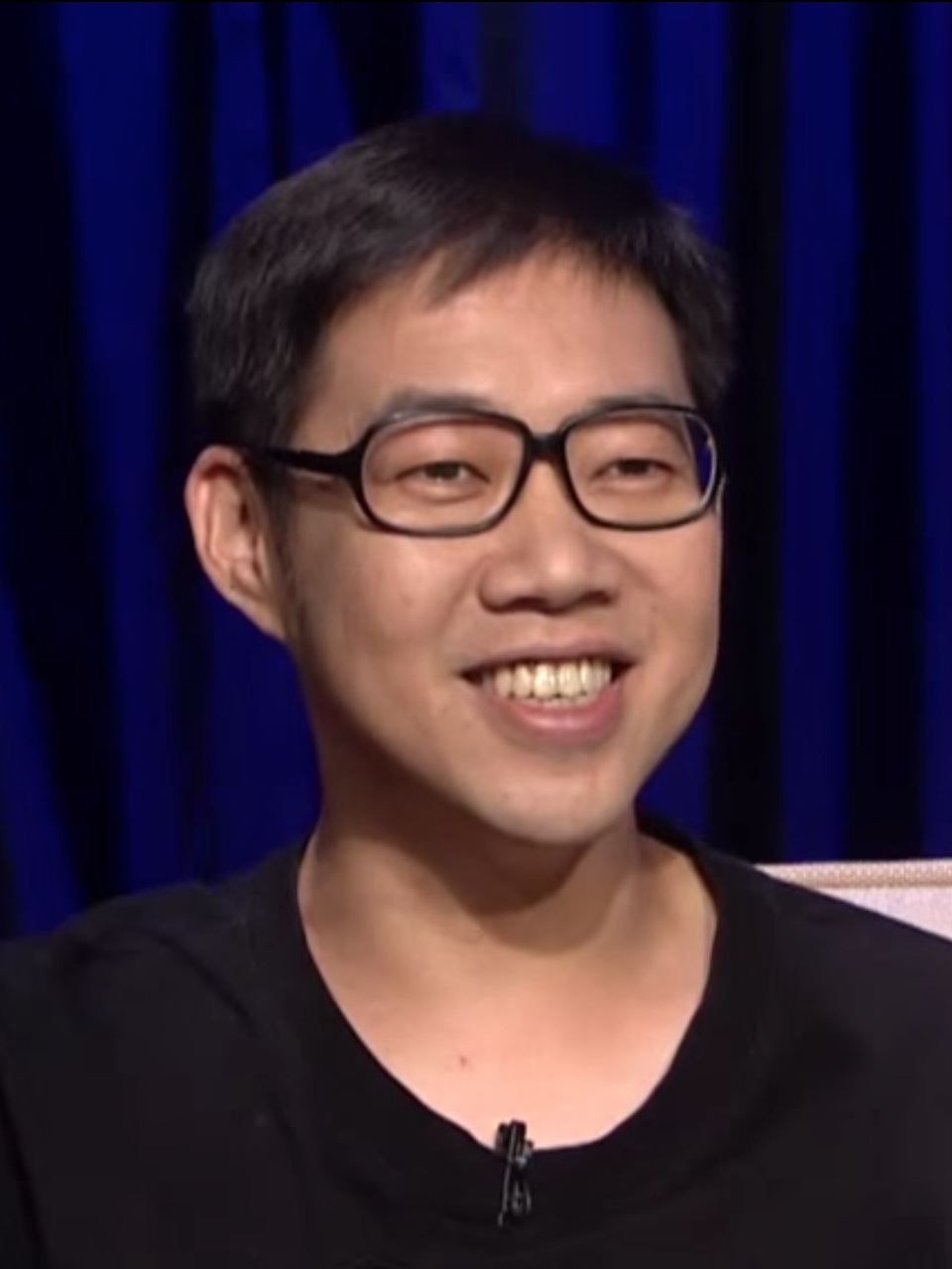
Director Tom Lin Shu-yu

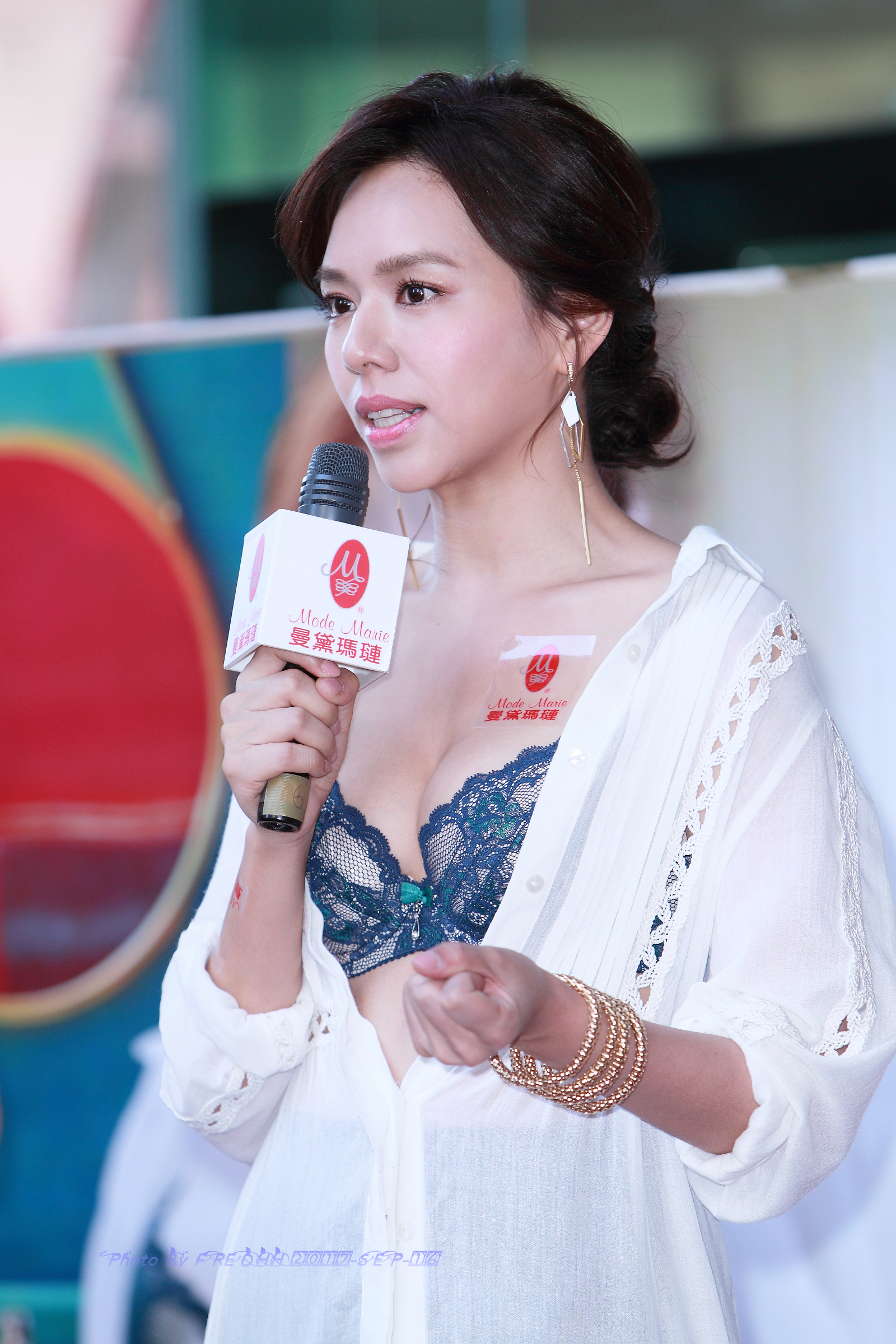
Lead actress Kimi Hsia

Casting decisions were made by Lin and Hsia together. Sam Tseng was cast due to his fluency in Hakka Chinese and his familiarity with Hsia from co-hosting Stylish Man - The Chef for nine years, thus joining the project at Hsia's invitation. Winnie Chang was invited by Lin to portray a funeral-mourning actress after he learned about the occupation in the news. Yang Kuei-mei was also cast early in the project with minimal discussion, as both Lin and Hsia felt that Yang's appearance resembled Hsia. To prepare for her role as a Hakka villager, Yang learned the language outside of the shoot. Hong Kong costume designer Karen Yip and Japanese composer Masaki Hayashi are also attached to the project. After securing funding from the Kaohsiung Filming Fund, Lin performed location scouting and set the story in Meinong District, Kaohsiung, due to its townscape being suitable for binary-coloured cinematography. Lin and Hsia also conducted field research together, with Lin studying penological rehabilitation through the Taiwan After-Care Association, while Hsia interviewed domestic violence victims via social workers, and the couple combined their research findings. In February 2023, the film was presented at the European Film Market.

=== Filming ===
Principal photography took place in 2023 in Kaohsiung, Taiwan, spanning approximately three to four weeks. The film was shot by Indian cinematographer Kartik Vijay, who previously collaborated with Tom Lin Shu-yu on The Garden of Evening Mist (2019). Lin invited Vijay to join the project to present Taiwan from a foreign perspective and to leverage Vijay's keen attention to detail. The shoot took place during Kaohsiung's rainy season, which required adapting many scenes to a rainy setting, including rewriting the opening sequence as a long take due to rain during filming, and production was delayed for two days due to a typhoon. Lin also proposed to shoot the climax scene in long takes, filming it in seven versions with different dialogues, while noting that the number of lines decreased version by version because he found them inappropriate for the performance. Most of the filming took place in the Meinong District, with additional location shoots in the city center and Cishan District.

== Release ==
Yen and Ai-Lee had its world premiere in competition for the Kim Jiseok Award at the 29th Busan International Film Festival on 5 October 2024. Winning the award, the jury described the film as "an unfinishing and bold portrayal of a traumatic mother and daughter relationship with powerful, beautiful performance" in the awards announcement statement. The film had an early screening on 8 October, and was released theatrically in Taiwan on 10 October.

== Reception ==
=== Box office ===
Yen and Ai-Lee grossed only NTD$195,000 on its opening day, which lead actress Kimi Hsia described as "discouraging and disappointing". Following positive reviews, the box office performance in the second week saw a surge of 20%, bringing the total gross to NTD$2.1 million.

=== Critical response ===
Nikki Baughan of Screen International commended Yen and Ai-Lee as a tragic tale that "benefits greatly from performances from Kimi Hsia and Yang Kuei-mei" and "monochromatic visuals throw the emotion of the story into sharp relief", particularly the "black-and-white aesthetic" and "warm production design", throughout which "Lin paints evocatively in light and shadow, emphasising moments of pain but also of hope as the pair learns to reconnect and slowly overcome the mistakes of the past". Alan Chu of United Daily News also wrote on the film's choice of shooting in black-and-white, stating that it "intentionally creates visual and narrative purity" and that Tom Lin "worked on the visuals, directly imbuing the film with a gray, melancholy and oppressive atmosphere", "as if the characters are struggling to survive in this world, desperately searching for the colors of life".

Chang Wan-hsuan, writing for The News Lens, described the film as "unexpectedly good" and praised Kimi Hsia's performance in the drama lesson scenes as "Golden Horse Award-worthy", noting that the scene's "claustrophobic close-up shots and large headscarves limited the actress's performance to the center of the frame", "making the audience watch how Kimi Hsia transforms from playing Yen into becoming the character herself, using a very full shot to explode the emotional tension of the character's repression". Cain Noble-Davies of FilmInk rated the film 8/10 and also considered the film "a powerful look at trauma, forgiveness, and the many roles that people play in life", writing that "Tom Lin Shu-yu's writing and Kimi Hsia's magnificent dual performances to present what feels like an honest, earnest, and relentlessly inquisitive snapshot of a real world, where hope can be discarded like flakes from a scratchie ticket, or soak itself in tears from under a funeral veil".

== Awards and nominations ==
Yen and Ai-Lee is the first Taiwanese film to win a Kim Jiseok Award at the Busan International Film Festival. It also received eight nominations in the 61st Golden Horse Awards, making it the second most-nominated film of the year.

Year	Award	Category	Nominee	Result	Ref.
2022	44th Golden Harvest Awards	Excellent Screenplay Award	—N/a	Won	
2024	29th Busan International Film Festival	Kim Jiseok Award	Tom Lin Shu-yu	Won	
2024	61st Golden Horse Awards	Best Leading Actress	Kimi Hsia	Nominated	
2024	61st Golden Horse Awards	Best Supporting Actress	Yang Kuei-mei	Won	
2024	61st Golden Horse Awards	Best Supporting Actor	Sam Tseng	Nominated	
2024	61st Golden Horse Awards	Best Original Screenplay	Tom Lin Shu-yu	Nominated	
2024	61st Golden Horse Awards	Best Cinematography	Kartik Vijay	Nominated	
2024	61st Golden Horse Awards	Best Film Editing	Tom Lin Hsin-ming	Nominated	
2024	61st Golden Horse Awards	Best Makeup & Costume Design	Karen Yip	Nominated	
2024	61st Golden Horse Awards	Best Art Direction	Penny Tsai	Nominated	
2025	40th Santa Barbara International Film Festival	Jeffrey C. Barbakow Award	—N/a	Won	
2025	18th Asian Film Awards	Best Supporting Actress	Yang Kuei-mei	Won	
