= Da-her Lin =

Taiwanese actor (born 1991)

- 林鶴軒
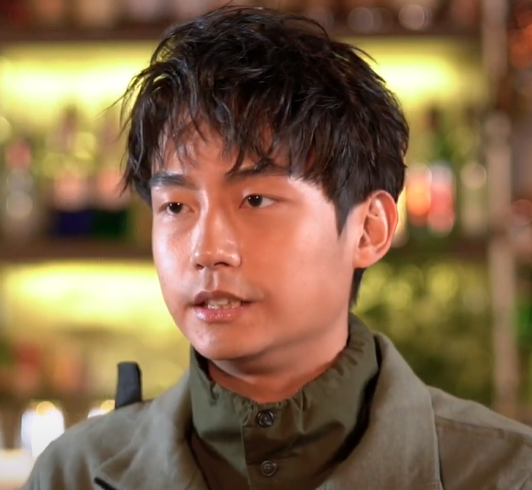
- Lin in June 2020
- Born: Lin He-hsuan; 7 January 1991 (age 35); Taiwan
- Education: National Taiwan University of Arts (BA)
- Occupation: Actor
- Years active: 2013–present

Lin He-hsuan (Chinese: 林鶴軒; born 7 January 1991), also known by his stage name Da-her Lin (大鶴), is a Taiwanese actor best known for his role as Lu Qun in the comedy horror film Secrets in The Hot Spring (2018), for which he won Best Supporting Actor in the 21st Taipei Film Awards. He also starred in the coming-of-age romance films Our Times (2015) and My Best Friend's Breakfast (2022), as well as romance series The Teenage Psychic (2017–2019) and Someday or One Day (2019).

== Early life and education ==
Lin was born on 7 January 1991. He has two elder brothers and a younger sister. He became interested in acting during primary school, after his class teacher invited him to join the drama club. He chose to study performing arts at the Taipei Municipal Fuxing Senior High School and was a classmate of fellow actor Greg Hsu. Lin continued his studies at the National Taiwan University of Arts, where he graduated with a Bachelor of Arts in drama. Prior to his acting debut, he was one of the regular hosts of the university student-focused talk show College Talk.

== Career ==
Lin made his acting debut with a minor role in the 2013 romance film Campus Confidential. Since then, he has starred in various coming-of-age romance films, beginning with the 2014 Café. Waiting. Love, and gained public recognition for his role as the gang buddy of Darren Wang's character in the 2015 Our Times. In 2017, Lin landed a recurring role as Birdy in the supernatural romance series The Teenage Psychic, which he later reprised in the second season released in 2019.

Lin's breakout role came as Lu Qun, one of the three students who went to a hot spring hotel to escape school bullies, in the 2018 comedy horror film Secrets in The Hot Spring. For this role, Lin won Best Supporting Actor and received a nomination for Best New Talent at the 21st Taipei Film Awards. In 2019, Lin had a main role in the drama series On The Road and appeared in the romance series Someday or One Day. The following year, he landed main roles in the sci-fi series Amensalism and romance series I, Myself, for which he received a nomination for Best Supporting Actor in a Television Series in the 56th Golden Bell Awards with the latter. He also starred in the coming-of-age romance film Do You Love Me As I Love You, but a large portion of his scenes were cut from the final version due to pacing.

In 2021, Lin received his first sole male lead role in the fantasy series The Pond directed by Cheng Wei-hao, for which he received a nomination for Best Leading Actor in a Miniseries or Television Film in the 57th Golden Bell Awards for this role. In 2022, Lin starred in another coming-of-age romance film, My Best Friend's Breakfast. The following year, he had a recurring role in the comedy series Oh No! Here Comes Trouble, and also served as the acting coach for the cast. Lin appeared in a main role as the Forensic Medical Examiner in Cheng Wei-hao's 2024 crime comedy series GG Precinct.

== Filmography ==
=== Film ===
Year	Title	Role	Notes/Ref.
2013	Campus Confidential	Geek	
2014	Café. Waiting. Love	Bookclub Chairman	
2015	Our Times	Da He (大賀)	
2017	Meant to Be	Wei (阿偉)	
2018	Secrets in The Hot Spring	Lu Qun (魯群)	
2018	A-Hu	Qing Zi (慶仔)	
2019	Big Three Dragons	Sheng Yi-chang (盛一章)	
2019	Stand By Me	Chicken (吹雞)	
2020	Do You Love Me As I Love You	A Chong (阿衝)	
2020	Get the Hell Out	Ku Te-you (古德祐)	
2021	The Soul	Lai Cheng-guang (賴承光)	Cameo
2021	Treat or Trick	Tsung (小聰)	
2022	My Best Friend's Breakfast	Tang Jung-shian (唐忠獻)	
2022	Marry My Dead Body	Mao's high school classmate	Cameo; deleted scene
2024	Dead Talents Society	Non-Believer (超鐵齒)	

=== Television ===
Year	Title	Role	Notes/Ref.
2014	Can't Be Without You	Yang Ming-hsun (楊明勳)	Guest role
2017	Lion Pride	Zhou Wen-xin (周文信)	Recurring role
2017	HIStory	Bai Chang-chang (白常常)	Recurring role (season 1)
2017–2019	The Teenage Psychic	Birdy (鳥哥)	Recurring role (season 1–2)
2019	On the Road	Zhong Han-wen (鍾翰文)	Main role
2019	Someday or One Day	Chen Si-yuan (陳思源)	Recurring role
2020	Amensalism	Lin Chun-xiong (林春雄)	Main role
2020	I, Myself	Chang Yi-jui (張一瑞)	Main role
2020	Non Reading Club	Customer	Cameo
2021	The Pond	Chiang Hsiao-yu (江小魚)	Main role
2021	Danger Zone	Guan Mingyang (關銘洋)	Guest role
2021	Rainless Love in a Godless Land	Da He (大賀)	Cameo
2022	Lang, Always by Your Side	Brother Yu (魚弟)	Main role
2023	Oh No! Here Comes Trouble	Lu Qun (魯群)	Recurring role
2024	Love On a Shoestring	Michael Chao	Co-starring
2024	Haunted House for Sale	Masked Man	Cameo
2024	GG Precinct	The Forensic Medical Examiner	Main role
2026	Agent from Above	Wang Hsiao-ming (王小明)	Recurring role

== Awards and nominations ==
Year	Award	Category	Work	Result	Ref.
2019	21st Taipei Film Awards	Best Supporting Actor	Secrets in The Hot Spring	Won	
2019	21st Taipei Film Awards	Best New Talent	Secrets in The Hot Spring	Nominated	
2021	56th Golden Bell Awards	Best Supporting Actor in a Television Series	I, Myself	Nominated	
2022	57th Golden Bell Awards	Best Leading Actor in a Miniseries or Television Film	The Pond	Nominated	
