= OSN (rapper) =

Taiwanese rapper and singer

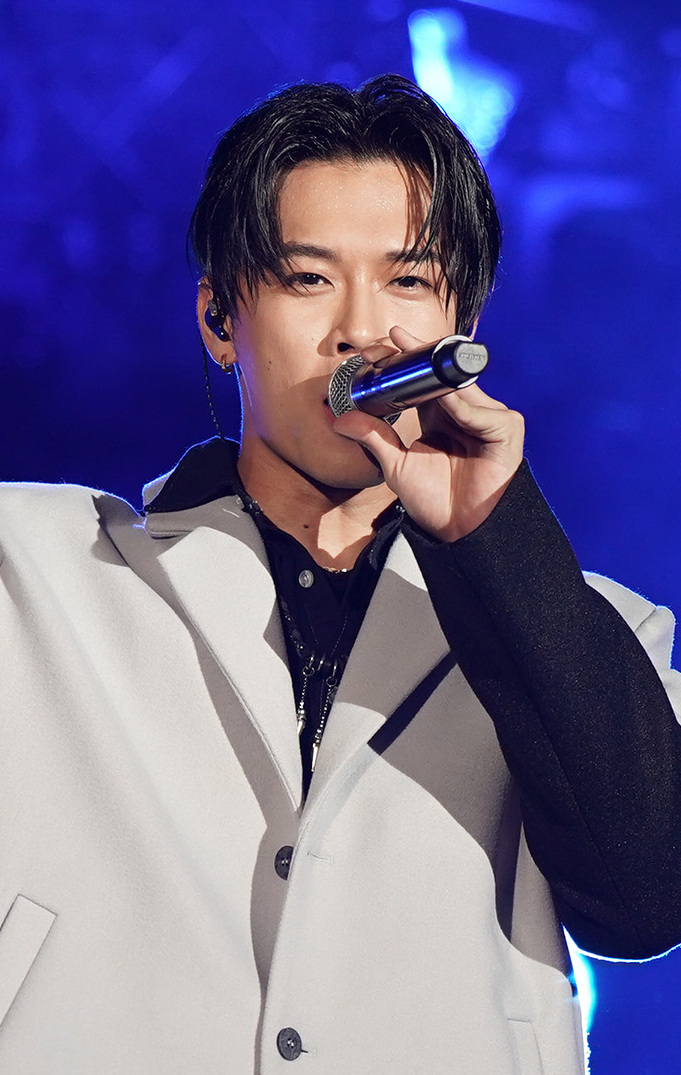
- OSN in December 2023

Background information
- Born: Kao Erh-hsuan; June 14, 1997 (age 28); Taipei, Taiwan
- Genres: Taiwanese hip hop
- Years active: 2018–present
- Labels: SKR Presents
- Website: Official website

Kao Erh-hsuan (Chinese: 高爾宣; pinyin: Gāo Ěrxuān; born June 14, 1997), better known by his stage name OSN, is a Taiwanese rapper and singer. Gao's music is characterized by his sentimental hip hop style and use of both Mandarin and English lyrics. Gao is represented by SKR Presents, a record label by music producer Skot Suyama.

== Early life ==
Gao was born in Muzha, Taipei on June 14, 1997. His father is a professor at Xiamen University, and his mother is a junior high school teacher. He briefly attended a community college in the United States, but returned to Taiwan in a year and a half.

== Career ==
After serving his four-month mandatory military service, Gao met Skot Suyama, who helped produce his future songs. In 2018, Gao debuted with first song, "Everybody Bounce". His 2019 song, "Without You", was a viral hit in Taiwan and was nominated for Song of the Year at the 31st Golden Melody Awards. On April 30, 2019, Gao released his debut album titled #osnrap. That same year, he won the Best New Asian Artist Mandarin award at the Mnet Asian Music Awards.

Besides his solo career, in 2018, Gao formed the rap group Ching G Squad with three other rappers: Shou, Red, and ChrisFlow. The group released their first extended play, Watermelon, on September 20, 2019.

== Discography ==
=== Studio albums ===
- #osnrap (2019)
- #OSNRAPII-JOURNEY (2022)

== Awards ==
| Year | Ceremony | Award | Nominated work | Result | Ref. |
|---|---|---|---|---|---|
| 2019 | Mnet Asian Music Awards | Best New Asian Artist Mandarin | — | Won | |
| 2020 | 31st Golden Melody Awards | Song of the Year | "Without You" | Nominated | |
| 2020 | 31st Golden Melody Awards | Best New Vocal | — | Nominated | |
