= Selina Leem =

Marshallese climate activist and spoken word performer

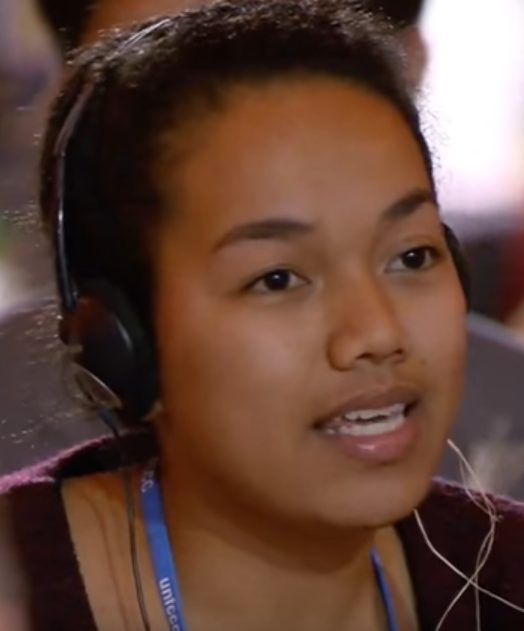
- Selina Leem speaking at COP21
- Born: Selina Neirok Leem; Majuro, Marshall Islands
- Education: Robert Bosch United World College
- Occupation: Activist • Spoken word performer

Selina Neirok Leem is a climate change activist and spoken word performer from the Marshall Islands. She was the youngest speaker at COP21 and has also spoken at COP26, making a "passionate plea" to world leaders for increased action on addressing climate change. Selina just recently became a TED speaker at the 2021 TED countdown summit.

== Early life ==
Leem was born and raised in Majuro, the capital city of the Marshall Islands. At the age of 16, she moved to Germany to finish high school at the UWC Robert Bosch College. She learned about climate change from stories her grandfather told her, who spoke about the impacts of a rising ocean to their home islands. Her concerns over global warming motivated her studies into the science of climate change in school.

While at UWC, Selina developed into a powerful public speaker. She shared her lived experience, as she talked about the reality of rising sea levels, drought and flooding on communities who have often been underrepresented on the global stage: “It is said that by 2030 my islands and other island nations will disappear under the water. But we refuse to accept this prediction.”

== Activism ==
Leem has raised concerns on permafrost melting, forest fires, and droughts. She advocates for the Marshall Islands and their vulnerability to rising waters due to climate change. Leem has raised the concern that the island nation has "neither the funds nor the expertise" to adapt to the impending impacts, and cites scientist predictions that the country could be gone within 50 years or less.

At age 18, Leem was invited to the COP21 summit by the Marshallese foreign minister Tony deBrum where she gave the closing statement. She was the youngest delegate to speak at COP21. In 2019, she was selected for the first UN Youth Climate Summit in New York.

Leem was also featured in Leonardo DiCaprio's documentary Before the Flood, speaking on behalf of the Marshall Islands.

In 2021, she spoke at COP26 in support of the Marshall Island's government pledge to achieve 100% renewable energy, presenting the opening statement for the World Leaders Summit. Leem emphasized that action like this would allow the government to stop black-outs and “to free up government resources to help the people achieve priorities like health and education.”

== Notable works ==
- Performed poem "I Grew, Giant" at COP26
- Nominated for contributing performance in the Best Indigenous Language Album category at the 33rd Golden Melody Awards
