= Chih Siou =

Taiwanese singer-songwriter

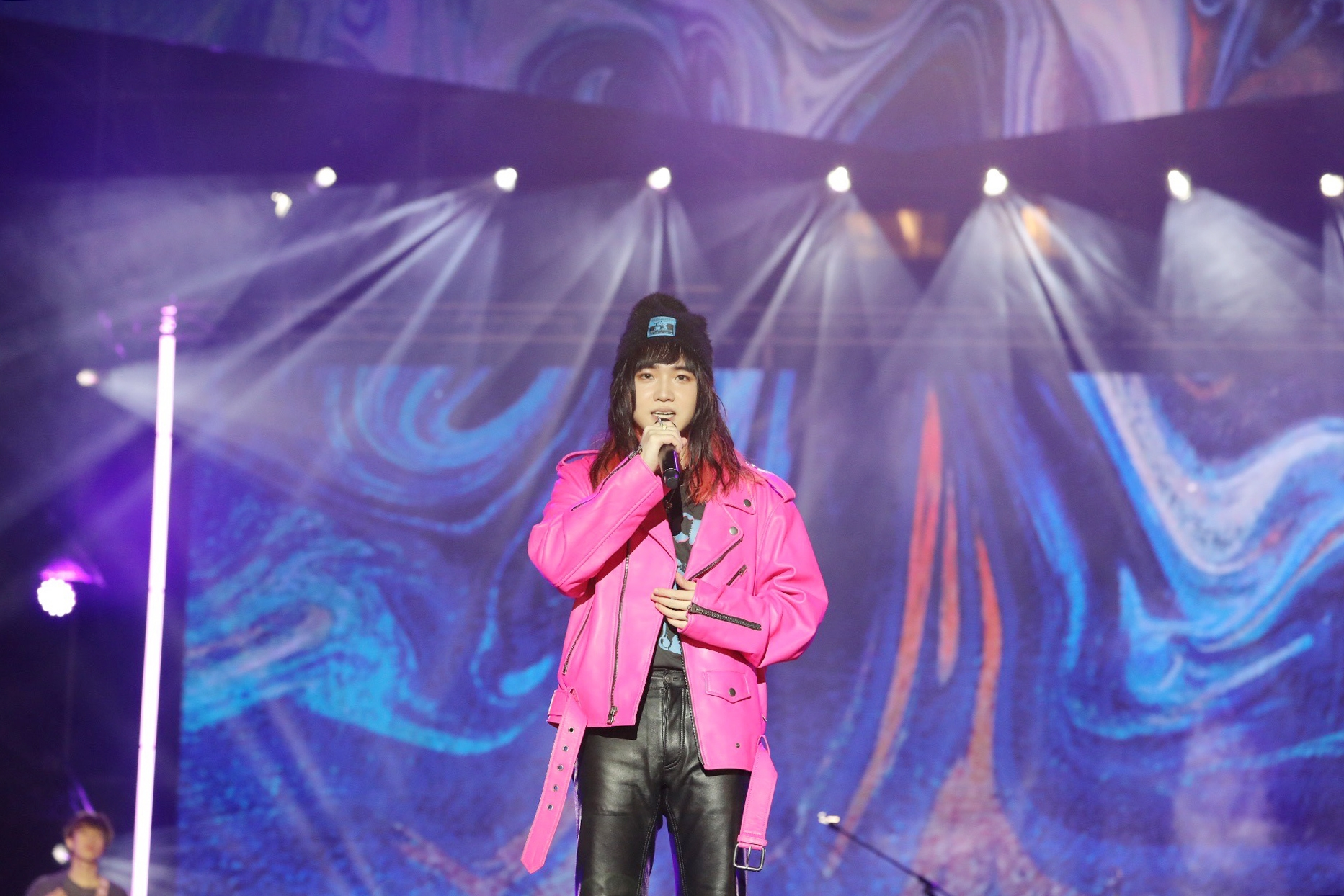

Background information
- Born: Taipei, Taiwan
- Genres: Mandopop
- Occupation: Singer-songwriter
- Years active: 2019–present
- Website: Chih Siou on Facebook; Chih Siou on StreetVoice

Chinese name
- Chinese: 持修
Transcriptions
Standard Mandarin
- Hanyu Pinyin: Chíxiū
Southern Min
- Hokkien POJ: Chhî-siu

Chih Siou is a Taiwanese singer-songwriter.

== Musical career ==
Chih Siou debuted in 2019 with the album, Elephant in the Room, which incorporates both electronic and folk pop genres. At the 31st Golden Melody Awards, Chih Siou won Best New Vocal Award for his 2019 album. He was named Best New Asian Artist at the 2020 Mnet Asian Music Awards. He is noted for his gender-fluid appearance.

== Discography ==
- Elephant in the Room (2019)
