= Kartik Vijay =

Indian cinematographer

- Education: Sir J.J. Institute of Applied Art; Los Angeles Film School
- Occupation: Cinematographer
- Years active: 2006–present

Kartik Vijay is an Indian cinematographer best known for his works in the Hindi and Sinophone cinema. He earned a nomination for Best Cinematography in the 64th Filmfare Awards with the Indian biographical drama film Manto (2018), and was also nominated for Best Cinematography four times with The Garden of Evening Mists (2019), The Soul (2021), Abang Adik (2023), and Yen and Ai-Lee (2024), in the 56th, 58th, 60th, and 61st Golden Horse Awards respectively.

== Biography ==
Vijay was born into an Indian family of musicians. He graduated from Sir J.J. Institute of Applied Art and worked as an art director in an advertising agency. When he was 24, he was introduced to several filmmakers through his job and became captivated by filmmaking. Determined to pursue his passion, he moved to the United States and attended Los Angeles Film School to study cinematography. He was mentored by cinematographer John Bailey and graduated in 2003. He credited the Indian film Charulata and the French-Italian film Cinema Paradiso as his major sources of artistic influence. Vijay made his Hindi film debut with the 2006 comedy thriller film Taxi No. 9211. He continued to work on various Hindi film projects, and received his breakout project, the 2018 biographical drama film Manto, for which he received a nomination for Best Cinematography in the 64th Filmfare Awards.

In 2019, Vijay made his international debut and served as the cinematographer for Malaysian historical drama film The Garden of Evening Mists directed by Tom Lin. Although the film starred an international cast of Sylvia Chang, Hiroshi Abe, John Hannah, and Julian Sands, Vijay was the only Indian on set. He received a nomination for Best Cinematography in the 56th Golden Horse Awards. Following the completion of The Garden of Evening Mists, Vijay took a hiatus from filming and embarked on a trip to Cuba and Japan. He returned to the film industry and cinematographed Cheng Wei-hao's Taiwanese sci-fi film The Soul in 2021, which earned him another nomination for Best Cinematography in the 58th Golden Horse Awards in the same year. In 2023, Vijay joined another Malaysian production and filmed Abang Adik, a neo-noir drama film directed by Jin Ong, for which he received his third nomination for Best Cinematography in the 60th Golden Horse Awards. He collaborated with Tom Lin once again on the drama film Yen and Ai-Lee in 2024, where he received his four nomination for Best Cinematography in the 61st Golden Horse Awards.

== Filmography ==
=== Film ===
Year	Title	Notes
2006	Taxi No. 9211	
2007	Anwar	
2008	Oye Lucky! Lucky Oye!	
2011	Game	
2013	Matru Ki Bijlee Ka Mandola	
2018	Manto	
2019	The Garden of Evening Mists	Malaysian film
2020	Yeh Ballet	
2021	The Soul	Taiwanese film
2022	My Name is Andrea	Documentary
2023	Abang Adik	Malaysian film
2024	Yen and Ai-Lee	Taiwanese film

== Awards and nominations ==
Year	Award	Category	Work	Result	Ref.
2019	64th Filmfare Awards	Best Cinematography	Manto	Nominated	
2019	56th Golden Horse Awards	Best Cinematography	The Garden of Evening Mists	Nominated	
2021	58th Golden Horse Awards	Best Cinematography	The Soul	Nominated	
2023	60th Golden Horse Awards	Best Cinematography	Abang Adik	Nominated	
2024	61st Golden Horse Awards	Best Cinematography	Yen and Ai-Lee	Nominated	
