= GG Precinct =

2024 Taiwanese television series

- Promotional poster

Chinese name
- Traditional Chinese: 正港分局
Transcriptions
- Genre: Crime comedy
- Written by: Cheng Wei-hao; Yin Chen-hao; Chou Man-you
- Directed by: Cheng Wei-hao; Yin Chen-hao
- Starring: Greg Hsu; Gingle Wang; Ma Nien-hsien; Flower Chen; Lulu Huang; Ng Ki-pin; Da-her Lin
- Country of origin: Taiwan
- Original language: Mandarin
- No. of seasons: 1
- No. of episodes: 6

Production
- Producers: Cheng Wei-hao; Veronica Jin
- Production company: Calendar Studios

Original release
- Network: Netflix
- Release: 22 August 2024

GG Precinct (Chinese: 正港分局) is a 2024 Taiwanese crime comedy television series directed and written by Cheng Wei-hao and Yin Chen-hao. The series is a spin-off to the 2022 supernatural comedy film Marry My Dead Body, with Greg Hsu, Gingle Wang, Ma Nien-hsien, and Flower Chen reprising their respective roles, while Lulu Huang, Ng Ki-pin, and Da-her Lin join the cast. The series centers around the GG Precinct squad members as they investigate a series of mysterious murders related to Chinese idioms.

The series consists of six episodes, and premiered on Netflix on 22 August 2024.

== Premise ==
The series centers around the eccentric GG Precinct squad members in an attempt to investigate and solve a series of mysterious murder cases with clues connected with Chinese idioms.

== Cast ==
=== Main ===
- Greg Hsu as Wu Ming-han, a straightforward and arrogant police detective of the GG Precinct
- Gingle Wang as Lin Tzu-ching, a police detective-turned-drug cartel mole who was appointed as the squad leader of the GG Precinct
- Ma Nien-hsien as Chang Yung-kang, a squad leader promoted as chief of the GG Precinct after the events of Marry My Dead Body
- Flower Chen as Chubby, an officer of the GG Precinct
- Lulu Huang as Li Shu-fen, a criminal profiler
- Ng Ki-pin as Shao-nien, a narcotics undercover agent
- Da-her Lin as The Forensic Medical Examiner, GG Precinct's police surgeon and a fan of Mogi Yumi

=== Recurring ===
- Tai Chih-yuan as Hsu Shui-yuan / The Chinese Idiom Killer, an infamous serial killer who leaves riddles about Chinese idioms at the crime scenes twenty years ago
  - Tony Yang (Note: Tony Yang and Chung Hsin-ling are credited as special appearances.) as young Hsu Shui-yuan
- Maria Abe as Mogi Yumi, a Japanese underground idol
- Kunda Hsieh as Hsieh Cheng-ta, a food delivery rider and a die-hard fan of Mogi Yumi
- Lin Po-sheng as Lin Pai-sheng, Mogi Yumi's manager
- Winni Huang as Huang Hsiao-yin, a food delivery rider and the sister of Huang Hsien
- Huang Hsuan as Huang Hsien, a cram school Chinese teacher
- Wu Yang-lin as Liu Miu-ting, a gifted high-school student
- Chung Hsin-ling as Deputy Director-general
- Yang Li-yin as Tutoring centre director

== Production ==
=== Development ===
Director Cheng Wei-hao conceived the idea of developing a crime comedy series featuring members of the GG Precinct while filming for the 2022 supernatural comedy film Marry My Dead Body. Cheng and producer Veronica Jin confirmed they would produce the project during the film's post-production, and invited the original cast members to reprise their roles when they returned to provide voice-overs for their characters. Intending to capitalise on the popularity of Marry My Dead Body and accommodate the actors' schedules before they took on other projects, Jin set a tight filming timeline with a projected premiere date of 2024. The series was greenlit and received funding from the Bureau of Audiovisual and Music Industry Development in November 2022, under the working title GG Precinct: The Murder Cases of Idioms. Jin teased the production of a spin-off series in May 2023 while marketing Marry My Dead Body in Korea, followed by an official announcement, with Yin Chen-hao joining Cheng as co-director and co-writer in August. The series was set to be distributed by Calendar Studios, and was announced to premiere on Netflix in February 2024. A teaser trailer was released on 5 July, and the series was initially stated to have eight episodes, but was trimmed down to six when the premiere date was announced on 15 July.

=== Casting ===
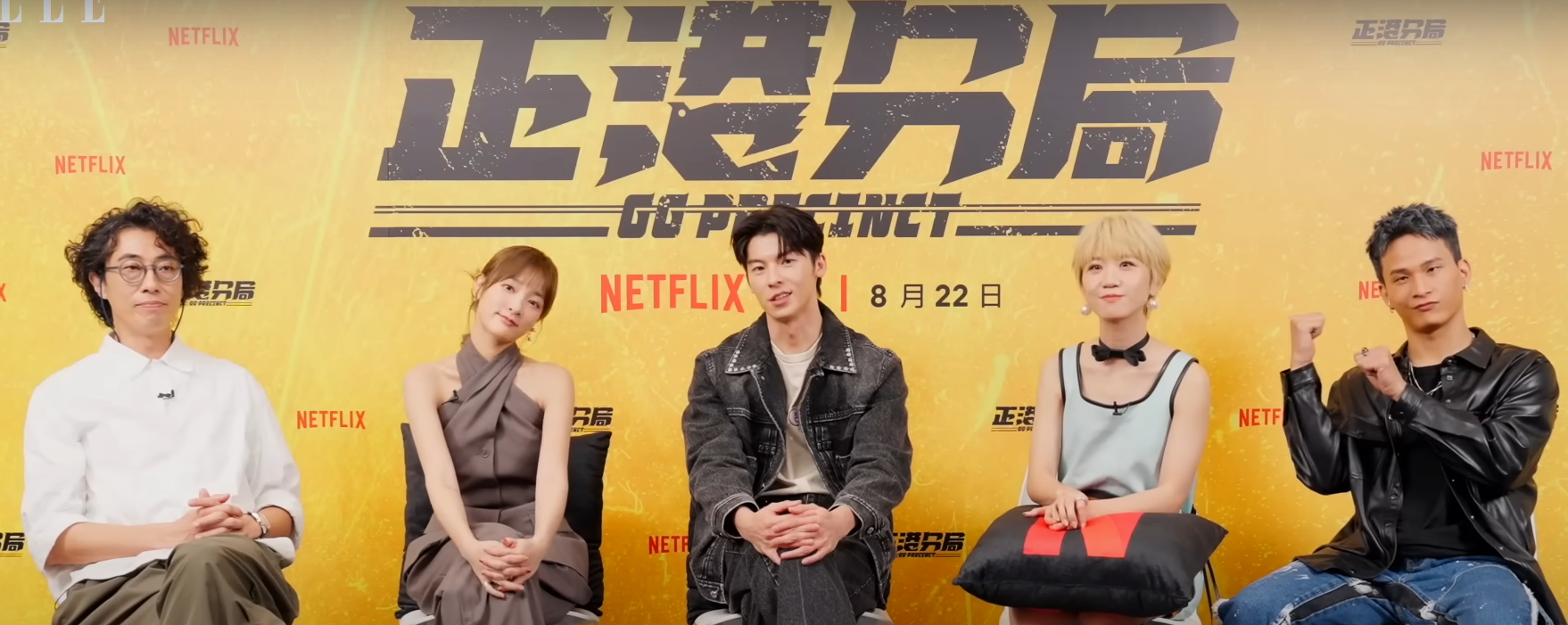
From left to right: Ma Nien-hsien, Gingle Wang, Greg Hsu, Lulu Huang, and Ng Ki-pin interviewed by Elle Taiwan

In August 2023, Greg Hsu, Gingle Wang, and Ma Nien-hsien were announced to reprise their respective roles from Marry My Dead Body. In July 2024, Flower Chen was also confirmed to reprise his role, while director Cheng Wei-hao revealed that Austin Lin, one of the three co-leading actors from the previous film, would not join this project, as his character had been killed off and maintaining story continuity would not allow for his return. Lulu Huang, Ng Ki-pin, and Da-her Lin were announced to join the cast in the same month. Tai Chih-yuan, Lin Po-sheng, Kunda Hsieh, Winni Huang, Wu Yang-lin, Maria Abe, and Huang Hsuan were revealed to be part of the ensemble through the second trailer released on 5 August. Tony Yang was announced to star on 20 August at a promotional press conference.

=== Filming ===
Principal photography began in November 2022, with location shooting taking place at the Taipei City Police Department Headquarters from 4 to 7 November. Scenes of the investigation at a murder victim's house were filmed at actress Paulina Hu's mansion in Bojue Village, Xizhi District. Due to a tight filming schedule, the screenplay was not completed before the commencement of production, and scriptwriting took place concurrently with the shoot. Filming wrapped up prior to the theatrical release of Marry My Dead Body, and entered post-production in May 2023.

== Release ==
GG Precinct consists of six episodes, and premiered on Netflix on 22 August 2024.

== Reception ==
=== Viewership ===
GG Precinct debuted at the top of Netflix's charts for Taiwan and Hong Kong during its first week of release.

=== Critical response ===
James Marsh of South China Morning Post gave GG Precinct 2/5 stars, critiquing that while the series attempts to blend grit and comedy with its misfit cop squad investigating a serial killer, the show ultimately falls short due to underdeveloped character dynamics and relationships, resulting in a lightweight and unresolved final product. Joel Keller of Decider also noted that the humor in the series came across as forced and unfunny, but praised the series' Brooklyn Nine-Nine-esque story arc and the interesting premise of a serial killer committing crimes based on Chinese idioms, which compensated for the show's comedic deficiencies with its overall entertainment value.

Chien Ying-jou, writing for United Daily News, considered the series a successful spinoff to the film Marry My Dead Body (2022), with lead actor Greg Hsu delivering a more relaxed and comedic performance compared to the film version, and the overall ensemble cast delivering an amusing and chaotic police procedural that manages to blend social commentary with its slapstick humor. Berton Hsu, writing for The News Lens, found the series' ambitious effort to match Calendar Studios' previous commercial successes by blending elements of American sitcoms with Japanese-style humor, delivering a unique and avant-garde approach that may surprise fans of the prequel Marry My Dead Body, though the diverse comedic styles and character portrayals could elicit mixed reactions from audiences.

=== Awards and nominations ===
Award	Date of ceremony	Category	Recipient(s)	Result	Ref.
Asia Contents Awards & Global OTT Awards	6 October 2024	Best OTT Original	GG Precinct	Nominated	
Asia Contents Awards & Global OTT Awards	6 October 2024	Best Lead Actor	Greg Hsu	Nominated	
