= Trout Fresh =

Taiwanese rapper (born 1989)

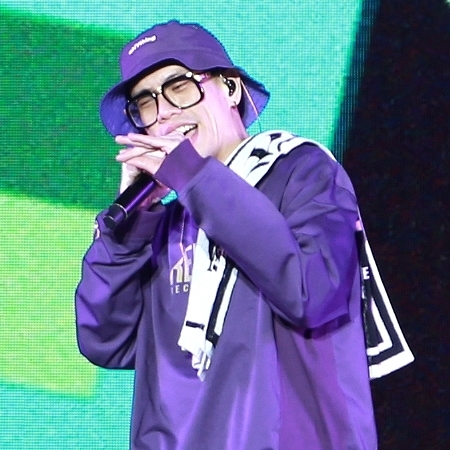
Trout Fresh performing in Tainan on New Year's Eve, 2020

Lu Shih-hsuan (Chinese: 呂士軒; born 12 March 1989), known professionally as Trout Fresh, is a Taiwanese rapper.

== Background ==
Lu Shih-hsuan was raised in Hsinchu, and became interested in rap at the age of fourteen, through the music of MC HotDog and Dwagie. He later listened to Tupac Shakur and The Notorious B.I.G. Lu also learned to dance, kept a notebook of his own lyrics, and while attending college, began producing music.

== Music career ==
Trout Fresh and his band, SmashRegz, played in their first concert in January 2016. Trout Fresh made his solo debut with the 2017 album Mistaken into the Way (誤入奇途). His work won Best Hip-Hop Album and Best Hip-Hop Single at the 2018 Golden Indie Music Awards, and the following year, he was invited to perform at a New Years celebration. Trout Fresh's 2024 album Good Sound with Attitudes (好聲豪氣) won him Best Male Mandarin Singer and Best Mandarin Album at the 36th Golden Melody Awards. He was awarded Best Male Mandarin Singer over PoLin, Hsiao Huang-chi, Terence Lam, and Li Ronghao.
