= Sugarcat =

Taiwanese R&B group

- Genres: Pop; R&B; soul; hip-hop
- Members: A-lan; Gao Zhen; San Zhi; Shao Yu

Chinese name
- Traditional Chinese: 唐貓
Transcriptions
Standard Mandarin
- Hanyu Pinyin: Táng Māo

Sugarcat is a Taiwanese R&B band. It was founded in 2017 by vocalists A-lan and Gao Zhen, who are also a guitarist and drummer respectively. The band debuted in 2019 with the eponymous album, SUGARCAT.

== Members ==
- A-Lan, guitarist, keyboardist, composer, producer
- Gao Zhen, vocalist and drummer
- San Zhi, bassist
- Shao Yu, keyboardist

== Discography ==
=== Album ===
- 唐貓 SUGARCAT (2019)
