= Siri Lee =

Taiwanese singer-songwriter (born 1989)

Siri Lee (Chinese: 李竺芯; born 17 June 1989) is a Taiwanese singer-songwriter, her born name is Li Chia-wei (李佳薇).

Lee was invited to perform at the presidential inauguration of Lai Ching-te in 2024. Lee won Best Taiwanese Female Artist at the 36th Golden Melody Awards for her 2024 Taiwanese-language album Suí (水), which also won Album of the Year and Best Taiwanese Album.
