= EggPlantEgg =

Taiwanese rock band

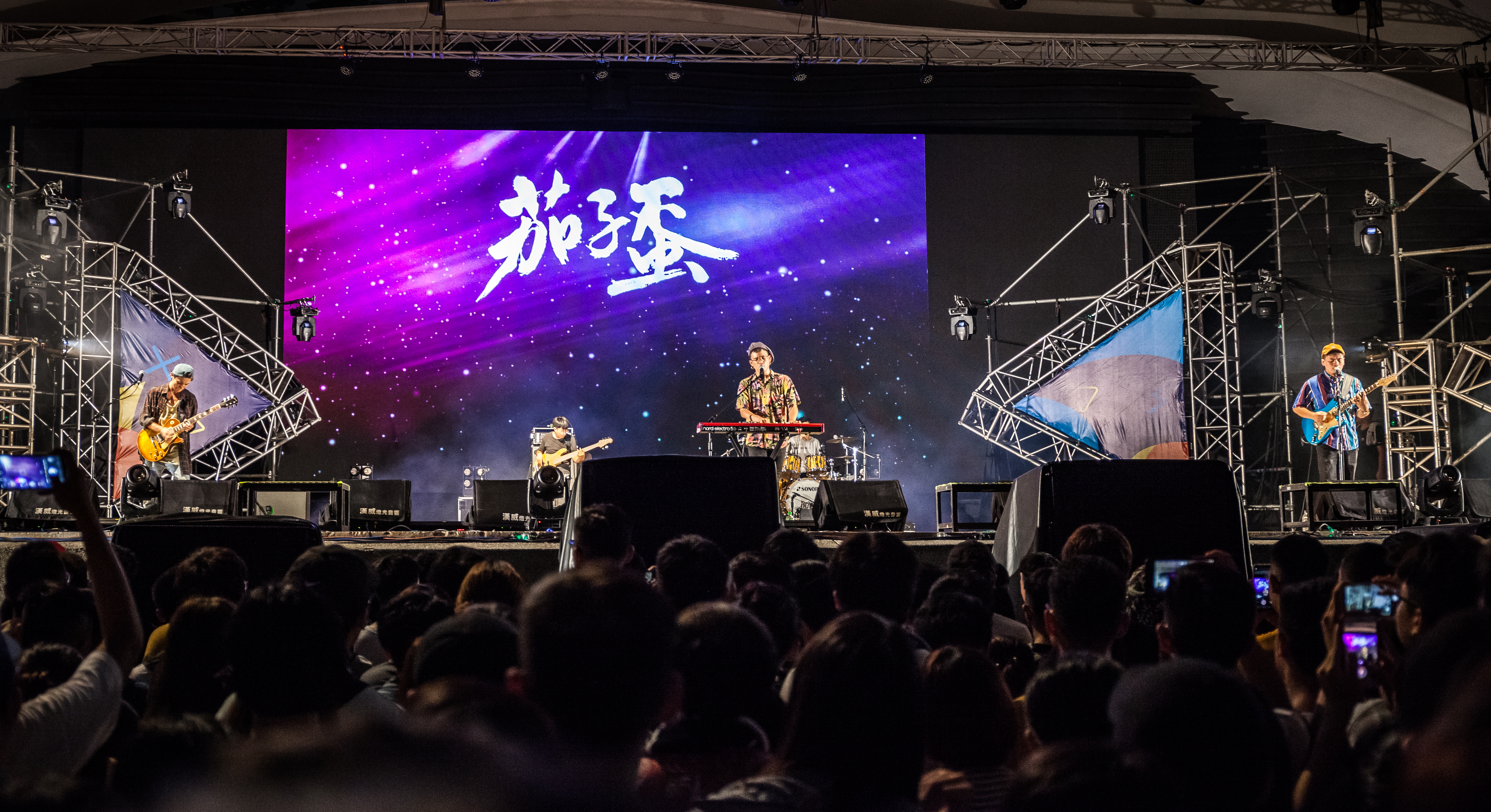
- EggPlantEgg performing in 2019

Background information
- Origin: Taiwan
- Genres: Indie rock; alternative rock; jazz fusion; Mandopop; Hokkien pop
- Years active: 2012–2022
- Members: Ng Ki-pin; A-ren Tsai; A-der Hsieh
- Past members: Jean Lai

Chinese name
- Traditional Chinese: 茄子蛋
Transcriptions
Standard Mandarin
- Hanyu Pinyin: Qiézǐdàn
Southern Min
- Hokkien POJ: Kiô-chí-tàn

EggPlantEgg (Chinese: 茄子蛋; pinyin: Qiézǐdàn; Pe̍h-ōe-jī: Kiô-chí-tàn; Taiwanese Hokkien: 茄仔卵; Pe̍h-ōe-jī: Kiô-á-nn̄g) is a Taiwanese indie rock band founded in 2012 in Taipei, composed of vocalist Ng Ki-pin and guitarists A-ren Tsai and A-der Hsieh. The band is known for spearheading a renaissance in Hokkien pop. EggPlantEgg has been on a hiatus since September 2022.

== History ==
EggPlantEgg was founded in 2012 by five students from Taipei Municipal Song Shan Senior High School, with Ng Ki-pin as the sole remaining original band member as of 2022. The band released their debut studio album, Cartoon Character, in July 2017. They won the Golden Melody Award for Best New Artist and Best Taiwanese Album in 2018. Their songs "Waves Wandering" and "Back Here Again" are among the most-viewed Chinese music videos on YouTube.

Jean Lai, the band's drummer, announced his departure in April 2019. The band has been on hiatus since September 2022.

== Band members ==
- Ng Ki-pin – vocals, keyboard
- A-ren Tsai – guitar
- A-der Hsieh – guitar

== Discography ==
- Cartoon Character 卡通人物 (2017)
- We Are Gonna Get Married 我們以後要結婚 (2019)
