= Taipei Municipal Song Shan Senior High School =

Coordinates: 25°02′37″N 121°33′56″E

Location
- No.156, Sec. 1, Keelung Rd., Xinyi Dist., Taipei City 110, Taiwan (R.O.C.)

Information
- Type: Municipal Senior High School; Mixed-sex education( The ratio of male to female is 1:1)
- Motto: Ethics, Democracy, Scientific spirit, Sense of honor, Responsibility, Spirit of service (倫理、民主、科學 榮譽、責任、服務)
- Established: 1958
- School district: Xinyi District; Taipei; Taiwan
- Principal: Chen Zong-Zhen (陳總鎮)
- Staff: 210 (approx.)
- Grades: 10 - 12
- Enrollment: 2800 (approx.)
- Color(s): Green
- Athletics: Basketball
- Information: +886-2-27535968
- Campus: 30149 square meters
- Website: http://www.sssh.tp.edu.tw/

The Taipei Municipal Song Shan Senior High School (SSSH; Chinese: 臺北市立松山高級中學; pinyin: Táiběishìlì Sōngshān gāojízhōngxué; Wade–Giles: t'ai^{2} pei^{3} shih^{4} li^{4} sung^{1} shan^{1} kao^{1} chi^{2} chung^{1} hsüeh^{2}) is a Taiwanese high school, located in the Xinyi District, Taipei.

== Outline ==
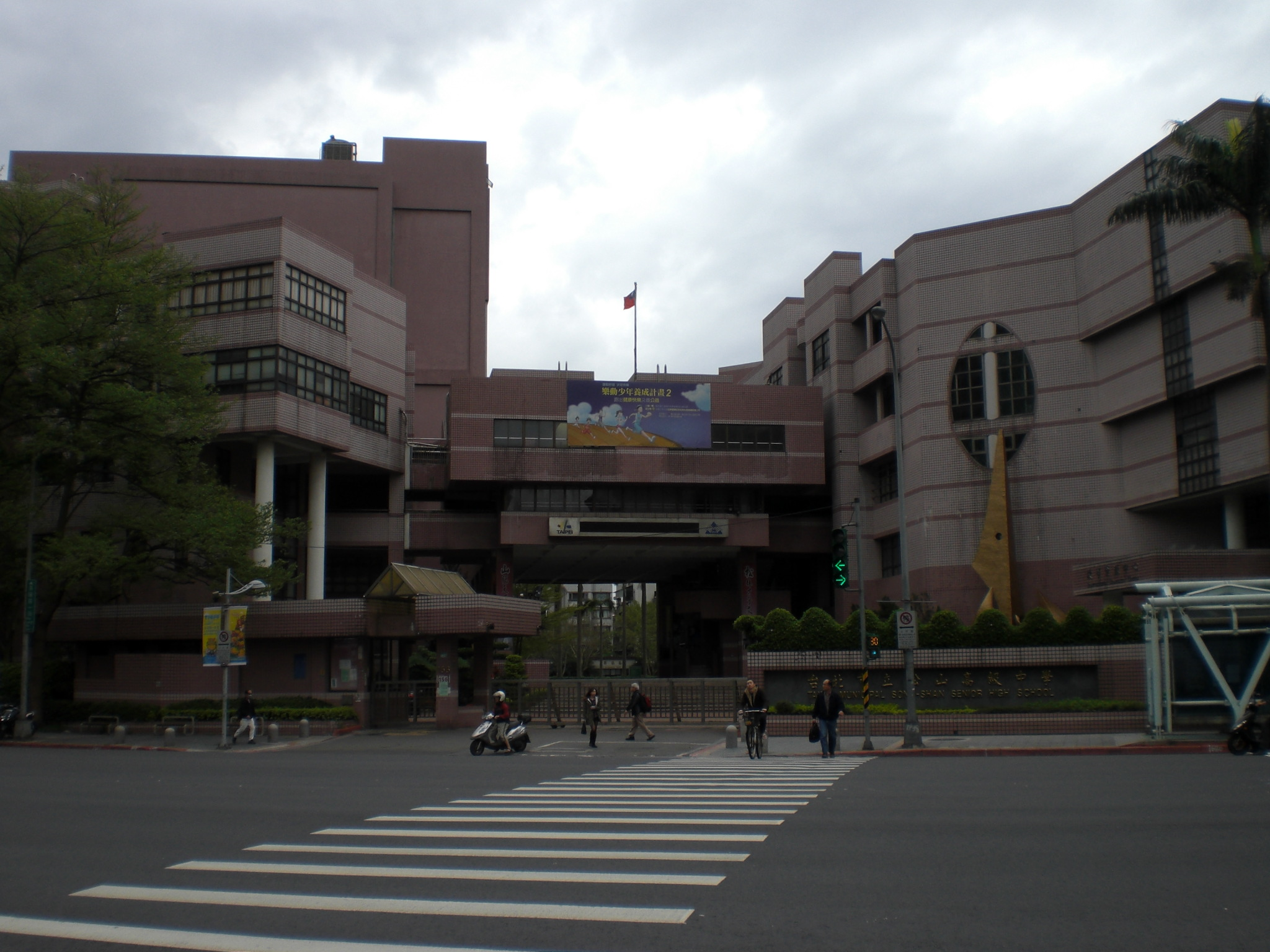
The maingate of Song Shan Senior High School

- 1958：Founded and named as Taipei Municipal Song Shan Junior Middle School (Chinese: 臺北市立松山初級中學).
- 1968：reorganized into Taipei Municipal Song Shan Junior High School (Chinese: 臺北市立松山國民中學).
- 1987：Taipei City Government formed Pre-opening Office of Song Shan Senior High (Chinese: 松山高中籌備處) in accordance with the policy by Government of the Republic of China (Taiwan).
- 1989：reorganized into Taipei Municipal Song Shan Senior High School (Chinese: 臺北市立松山高級中學).

=== Position ===
Song Shan Senior High School is located in Xinyi District, new commercial center of Taipei City. Keelung Road and Songlong Road cross with each other in front of the main entrance; the school is close to exits of Civic Blvd Expressway and Huandong Ave. Taipei City Hall Station( Blue Line, Taipei Rapid Transit System) is walking about 5 minutes away. United Daily News Group, Taipei City Hall, National Police Agency, Taipei Dome, Taipei 101, Taipei City Hall, Uni Style Department Store, Shin Kong Mitsukoshi Department Store, Taipei Nan Shan Plaza, Far Eastern Department Store, Eslite Bookstore and Sun Yat-sen Memorial Hall are the landmark buildings situated nearby.

=== Campus ===
The campus contains a five-story academic building, an administration building, a library building, an arts and music building, a gymnasium, an indoor pool, 200 m (660 ft) runway playground, four volleyball courts, a tennis court, and 12 outdoor basketball hoops. All courts can be lightened at night.

== See also ==
- List of schools in Taiwan
- High school
- Education in Taiwan
