= Golden Melody Award for Best Hakka Album =

Taiwanese music award

- Awarded for: Quality Hakka language music albums
- Country: Taiwan
- Presented by: Ministry of Culture
- First award: 2005
- Website: gma.tavis.tw

The Golden Melody Award for Best Hakka Album (Chinese: 金曲獎最佳客語專輯獎) is an honor presented at the Golden Melody Awards, a ceremony that was established in 1990, to recording artists for quality Hakka language music albums.

The honor was first presented in 2005 as Best Hakka Pop Vocal Album at the 16th Golden Melody Awards to the album Evening. In 2007, the category became known as Best Hakka Album.

== Recipients ==
Year	Performing artist(s)	Work	Nominees	Ref.
2005		Evening	Night Together; Distant Drums	
