= Justin Su =

Taiwanese lawyer and musician (born 1970)

Justin Su or Su Ming-yuan (Chinese: 蘇明淵; born 16 April 1970) is a Taiwanese lawyer and musician.

Su was raised in Kaohsiung. After graduating from high school, he moved to Taipei to attend college and began his legal career.

Su's song "Sunflower Without Roots" won the Taiwanese Hokkien category of the 2019 Taiwan Music Composition and Songwriting Contest. The following year, Su won Best Male Taiwanese Singer at the 31st Golden Melody Awards for his album We All Have Good Nature. In 2024, Su won his second Golden Melody Award for Best Male Taiwanese Singer for the album Empty Side of the Heart.
