= Golden Melody Award for Best Taiwanese Album =

Taiwanese music award

- Awarded for: quality Hokkien pop music albums
- Country: Taiwan
- Presented by: Ministry of Culture
- First award: 2005
- Website: gma.tavis.tw

The Golden Melody Award for Best Taiwanese Album (Chinese: 金曲獎最佳台語專輯獎) is an honor presented at the Golden Melody Awards, a ceremony that was established in 1990, to recording artists for quality Hokkien pop music albums.

The honor was first presented in 2005 as Best Taiwanese Pop Vocal Album at the 16th Golden Melody Awards to Jody Chiang for Love. In 2007, the category became known as Best Taiwanese Album. Chiang currently holds the record for the most nominations and awards, with seven and four respectively.

== Recipients ==
Year	Performing artist(s)	Work	Nominees	Ref.
2005	Jody Chiang	Love	True Words - Showlen Maya; Becoming Number One Scholar - Chang Yu-wei; Black Guitar - Hsiao Huang-chi; Recent Me - Luantan Ascent	
