= Chen Jiannian =

Taiwanese Puyuma singer

- Pau-dull
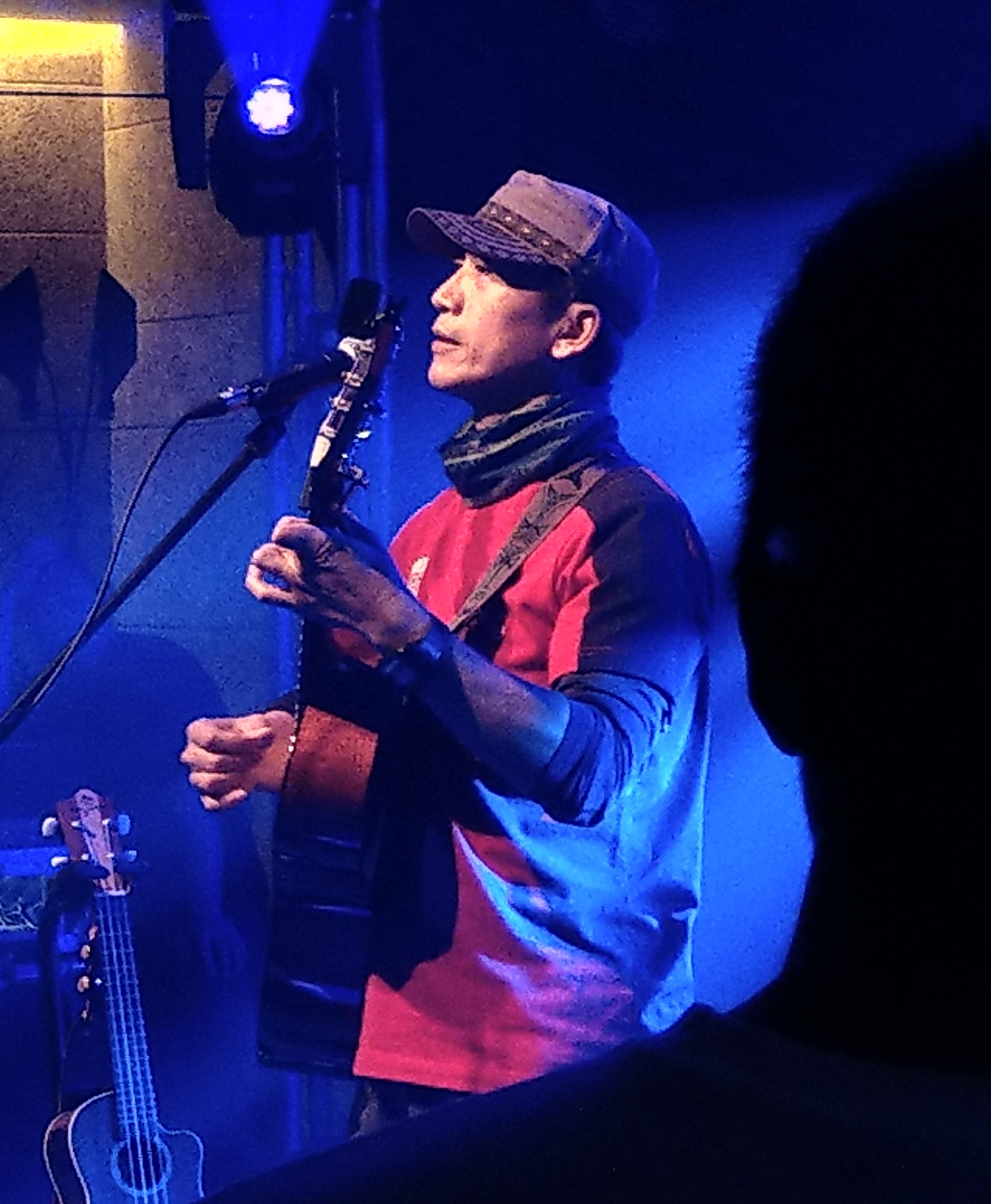
- Chen in 2018
- Born: Chen Jiannian; 1 August 1967 (age 59); Puyuma Sakuban Community, Taitung, Taiwan
- Education: National Taitung Junior College, Taiwan Police College
- Occupations: Singer; songwriter; producer; police officer
- Years active: 1999–present
- Awards: Golden Melody Awards – Best Mandarin Male Singer; 2000 The Ocean; Best Composition; 2000 Legend; Wild Fire, Spring Wind; Best Instrumental Album; 2007 I-yen-mei-leg Village No. 3 Best Album Producer; 2009 The Nanwan Sisters; Best Instrumental Album Producer; 2019 Black Bear Forest OST Original Soundtrack; Best Aboriginal Album (Indigenous Languages); 2022 pongso no Tao
- Musical career
- Also known as: Pau-dull
- Genres: Mandapop, Indigenous Pop, Instrumental
- Labels: Taiwan Colors Music, Feeling Good Music

Chinese name
- Traditional Chinese: 陳建年
- Simplified Chinese: 陈建年
Transcriptions
Standard Mandarin
- Hanyu Pinyin: Chén Jiànnián
- Wade–Giles: Chen Chien-nien

Chen Jiannian (Chinese: 陳建年; born 1 August 1967), tribal name Pau-dull, is a Taiwanese Puyuma singer. In 2000, he won Best Male Mandarin Singer and Best Composition for the song Legend from Samingad's Wild Fire, Spring Wind at the 11th Golden Melody Awards. After retiring from policing to focus on music, he won Best Aboriginal Album (Indigenous Languages) for pongso no Tao at the 33rd Golden Melody Awards.

== Early life ==
Chen was born on 1 August 1967 in the Puyuma Sakuban Community in Taitung, Taiwan. His maternal grandfather Senbao Lu was a composer and educator. He is the uncle of singers Samingad and Jia Jia.

Learning to play the guitar at a young age, he started a folk quartet with his brother and friends in 1982. In 1984, they entered a songwriting competition in Kaohsiung and recorded a compilation album with the other participants.

He studied architecture at National Taitung Junior College and then attended Taiwan Police College.

== Career ==
=== Music ===
In 1999, Chen released his first album The Ocean.

In 2002, he released his second album The Earth.

From 2000 to 2018, he composed the soundtracks for several movies, including Trekking the Way Home, The Rest of Life - Seediq Bale, and Black Bear Forest. In 2007, he won Best Instrumental Album for I-yen-mei-leg Village No. 3 at the 18th Golden Melody Awards. In 2019, he won Best Instrumental Album Producer for Black Bear Forest at the 30th Golden Melody Awards.

Throughout his career, he has collaborated with various artists, such as his niece Samingad and The Nanwan Sisters, a trio of Taiwanese indigenous singers. In 2009, he won Best Album Producer for The Nanwan Sisters at the 20th Golden Melody Awards.

In 2021, he released his third album pongso no Tao.

On 12 February 2022, he held his first large concert with Japanese band Tokyo Chuo-Line at the Taipei International Convention Center, along with Abao as guest. They also performed at Kaohsiung Music Center on 9 April 2022.

=== Law enforcement ===
Chen graduated from police academy in 1986 and was first assigned to a station in Guanshan, Taitung. He also worked in various locations throughout Taiwan.

He worked in Lanyu until his retirement on 1 September 2017.

== Discography ==
=== Studio albums ===
Title	Album details	Track listing
The Ocean 海洋	Released: June 1999; Label: Taiwan Colors Music; Formats: CD	Track listing: 1. 序曲; 2. 海洋; 3. 鄉愁; 4. 我們是同胞; 5. 穿上彩虹衣; 6. 長老的叮嚀; 7. 故鄉Puyuma; 8. 雨與你; 9. 也曾感覺; 10. 遊子情; 11. 走活傳統; 12. Ho-Yi-Naluwan; 13. 早晨的晚霞
The Earth 大地	Released: September 2002; Label: Taiwan Colors Music; Formats: CD	Track listing: 1. 序曲; 2. 大地情懷; 3. 孩子與你 我的天堂; 4. 曠野英雄; 5. 媽媽的花環; 6. Yi na ba yu ddia(朋友你好嗎); 7. 台東心蘭花情; 8. Ba La Ba; 9. 姆姆的Blue; 10. 別想太多; 11. 藍藍的唸珠; 12. 勸 13. Amis的饗宴
pongso no Tao 人之島	Released: 5 August 2021; Label: Feeling Good Music; Formats: CD	Track listing: 1. 序曲（A KO KAY ）你好啊 Hello!; 2. manawey之歌 Song of manawey 3. sira kavakes 女性朋友之歌 Hello My Female Friends; 4. 潛入蘭嶼海 Diving into the Sea; 5. 男子田野情歌 （jiadanket a mehakey） The Farmer’s Ballad; 6. 蘭嶼夜的浪漫與詭異 Night Romance of the haunted Island; 7. 蘭嶼情歌 Orchid Island Ballad; 8. 返巴丹島的女子 The Woman Who Returned to Batanes; 9. 牆角下的小男孩 The Little Boy in the Corner; 10. 海的眼淚 Tears of the Ocean; 11. pongso no Tao 蘭嶼 Orchid Island; 12. 晨之出航 Morning Voyage; 13. 藍海中划行的大板舟 The Big Tatala Sailing in the Blue Sea; 14. 烈陽下逆流划向台灣海峽 Sailing Against the Current Under the Blazing Sun; 15. 船員補給後繼續划行衝刺 Well-fed Sailors Speeding Up; 16. 美麗心蘭嶼 Beautiful Heart of Orchid Island

=== Live albums ===
Title	Album details	Track listing
Pur-dur & Panai Unplugged Live 勇士與稻穗	Released: 2001; Label: Taiwan Colors Music; Formats: CD; Note: Performed with Panai Kusui	Track listing: 1. 你快樂所以我快樂 I'm Happy Because You're Happy; 2. Ho-a-i-yE-yan; 3. 捆綁 Tied Up in Knots; 4. TALKING; 5. 怎麼會這樣 Why？; 6. 白米酒 Rice Wine; 7. 大武山美麗的媽媽 My Beautiful Mother, Da-Wu Mountain; 8. 蘭嶼之戀 Memories of Orchid Island; 9. TALKING; 10. yi-na-pa-yiu-ddia 11. TALKING; 12. MuMu的Blue MuMu ’s Blue; 13. 雨與你 Rain and You; 14. 輕鬆快樂的歌 Relaxed and Happy; 15. ho-yi-na-lu-wan 16. 太巴塱民謠 Tai-ba-lang Folksong From Amis

=== Singles ===
Title	Single details	Notes/Ref.
Fate 知命	Released: 28 December 2018; Label: Taiwan Colors Music; Formats: Digital download	

=== Soundtracks ===
Title	Album details	Track listing
The Ocean 海有多深	Released: 2000; Label: Taiwan Colors Music; Formats: CD	Track listing: 1. 生命有海洋 There are Oceans within Life; 2. 海邊的孩子 Beach Children; 3. 回想 Remembering; 4. 浮雲 Drifting Clouds; 5. 青春 Balled to Youth; 6. 青春哀歌 The Crying Road Home; 7. 哭泣的回家之路 The Ocean's Allure; 8. 海洋的招喚 The Ocean's Allure; 9. 寂寞的雨 Lonely Rain; 10. 蘭嶼情歌 Orchid Island Love Song; 11. 生之喜悅 The Bliss of Birth; 12. 生命的海洋 The Ocean of Life; 13. 海有多深 How Deep is the Ocean; 14. 浪 Waves
I-yen-mei-leg Village No. 3 東清村三號	Released: 1 February 2006; Label: Taiwan Colors Music; Formats: CD	Track listing: 1. 出航; 2. 老船長的心聲; 3. 甘苦的外籍船員; 4. 船員的檳榔攤; 5. 火車小站; 6. 回台東的火車; 7. 擁抱蘭嶼島; 8. 蘭嶼情歌; 9. 翱翔的珠光鳳蝶; 10. 復育蘭嶼野生動植物; 11. 想你一切都好; 12. 要去釣魚嗎 + Rarawood
How High is the Mountain 山有多高	Released: November 2011; Label: Taiwan Colors Music; Formats: CD	Track listing: 1. 走在雲霧的山路上 Walking on the misty mountain trail 2. 秋水彎彎 Meandering river in the autumn 3. 京城印象 Image of the native city 4. 歸鄉路 The road home 5. 古廟旁的老磚牆 Old brick wall of the ancient temple 6. 吐煙回想 Reminiscing while puffing away on a pipe 7. 熱烘烘的太陽 Nice and warm sun (演唱); 8. 湘江邊的父子 Father and son sit by the riverside of Xiang River; 9. 存糧樂 Joy of storing up grain 10. 品餚話家常 Chit-chatting while savoring 11. 禾風中的思念 The yearning for home is blowing in the wind 12. 山有多高 How high is the mountain (演唱)
Trekking the Way Home Main Theme of Documentary 縱行囝仔電影主題曲	Released: 2013; Label: N/A; Formats: Digital download	Track listing: 1. 縱行囝仔
The Rest of Life - Seediq Bale Pusu Qhuni Original Soundtrack 餘生-賽德克巴萊	Released: October 2014; Label: Taiwan Colors Music; Formats: CD	Track listing: 1. 餘生-片頭曲 The Rest of Life, Opening Song; 2. 馬紅莫那之歌 Song of Mahon Mona; 3. 遷徙之歌 Migration; 4. 溯源之歌 Tracing the Source; 5. 溯源之歌變奏曲 Tracing the Source, Variations; 6. 餘生-片中曲 The Rest of Life, Theme Song; 7. 高山尋根之路 The Seeking Road in the Mountain; 8. Pusu Qhuni （祖靈之地） The Ancestral Land; 9. 歡聚祖靈之歌 Joyful gathering with ancestors
Black Bear Forest OST Original Soundtrack 黑熊森林電影原聲帶	Released: June 2018; Label: DH3夏日記事音像; Formats: CD	Track listing: 1. 前進有熊國; 2. 走在布農傳統領域; 3. 尋熊手記; 4. 搭起臨時屋的喜悅; 5. 大分小學校校歌; 6. 斷掌熊悲歌I; 7. 土葛事件; 8. 斷掌熊悲歌II; 9. 逐熊而居; 10. 東看西看; 11. 劫後餘生; 12. 雲霧森林; 13. 眾神歸來的森林; 14. 終曲

== Awards and nominations ==
=== Golden Melody Awards ===
Year	Category	Nomination	Result	Ref.
2000	Best Composition	Chen Jiannian for "Legend "	Won	
2000	Best Best Male Mandarin Singer	Chen Jiannian	Won	
2007	Best Instrumental Album	I-yen-mei-leg Village No. 3	Won	
2009	Best Album Producer	The Nanwan Sisters	Won	
2019	Best Instrumental Album Producer	Black Bear Forest OST Original Soundtrack	Won	
2022	Album of the Year	pongso no Tao	Nominated	
2022	Best Singer (Indigenous Language)	pongso no Tao	Nominated	
2022	Best Aboriginal Album (Indigenous Languages)	pongso no Tao	Won	
