= Akawyan Pakawyan =

Taiwanese Puyuma educator (born 1938)

Akawyan Pakawyan (Chinese: 林清美; born 1938) also known as Mumu, meaning "elder", is a Taiwanese Indigenous Puyuma educator known for her work in passing down the Puyuma language and culture, particularly folk music and traditional rituals.

She began teaching Puyuma as a child in after school lessons with her peers. In 1992, she formed the "Taiwan High Mountain Culture and Dance Troupe" (Chinese: 台灣高山舞集文化藝術服務團, abbr. "High Mountain Dance Troupe" 高山舞集) to show young people Puyuma music and dance. She has won various awards through the years and has been termed a Puyuma "living dictionary".
