= Puyuma =

Puyuma (also Pinuyumayan) may refer to:

- the Puyuma people, tribe, are one of the tribal groups of the Taiwanese aborigines. The tribe is generally divided into the Chihpen and Nanwang groups, both resident in Taitung County on the east coast of Taiwan
- the Puyuma language, the language of the Puyuma people, a tribe of indigenous people on Taiwan (see Taiwanese aborigines). It is a Formosan language of the Austronesian family. Most speakers are older adults
- the Puyuma Express, the express train operated by Taiwan Railway
