= 30th Golden Melody Awards =

Taiwan music awards ceremony in 2019

- Date: June 29, 2019 (Popular music)
- Venue: Taipei Arena (Popular music)
- Country: Taiwan
- Hosted by: Lulu
- Website: gma.tavis.tw

Television/radio coverage
- Network: TTV

The 30th Golden Melody Awards (Chinese: 第30屆金曲獎) took place in Taipei, Taiwan in 2019. The award ceremony for the popular music categories was hosted by Lulu and broadcast on TTV on 29 June.

== Winners and nominees ==
Below is the list of winners and nominees for the popular music categories.

Vocal category – Record label awards
Album of the Year	Song of the Year
Ugly Beauty – Jolin Tsai; L.O.V.E. – Eason Chan; Where Are We Going? – Eli Hsieh; Wu Bing Singing, Yo Chin Soothing – Leo Wang; Fade to Exist – Eve Ai; Shi's Journey – Shi Shi; ØZI: The Album – ØZI; 0 – Sandy Lam; Battlefields of Asura – Chthonic; Snails – Joey Chiang; Tsa-bóo gín-á – Nana Lee; Jazz’s Good! – Emily Kuan; Warming a Pot of Youth to Drink – Ardor Huang; Darknet – Dwagie; Forgotten West – Sam Liao; Drifting – Voter Hsu, Huang Wei-chieh, Liu Jung-chang, and Yeh Yu-ting; Return & Restore – iColor; Stay – Lo Ssu-jung; Love for Granted – Gina Yang; Swasieq – Yawai Mawlin; Senglit – Muniyu; Vangav – Cemelesai; Yuan Yin Cheng Xian A Mei Zu Fu Yin Chuan Chang – Wu Chia-lu, Tseng Kuang-fu, Wang Fu-lai, Yang Shih-mei, Lin Jung-mei, and Kuo Mei-yu; Ti Cemelesai Ata Salasaladj – Kerekelj and Eleng	"Womxnly" (from Ugly Beauty) – Jolin Tsai; "Millennia's Faith Undone (The Aeon's Wraith Version)" (from Millennia's Faith Undone (The Aeon's Wraith Version)) – Chthonic and Denise Ho; "To Be Together" (from L.O.V.E) – Eason Chan; "Core" (from 0) – Sandy Lam; "Seventeen" (from Seventeen) – S.H.E; "Newly Written Old Song" (from Newly Written Old Song) – Jonathan Lee; "Waves Wandering" (from Waves Wandering) – EggPlantEgg
Best Mandarin Album	Best Taiwanese Album
Shi's Journey – Shi Shi; Where Are We Going? – Eli Hsieh; Wu Bing Singing, Yo Chin Soothing – Leo Wang; Fade to Exist – Eve Ai; Ugly Beauty – Jolin Tsai; ØZI: The Album – ØZI; 0 – Sandy Lam	Forgotten West – Sam Liao; Battlefields of Asura – Chthonic; Snails – Joey Chiang; Tsa-bóo gín-á – Nana Lee; Jazz’s Good! – Emily Kuan; Warming a Pot of Youth to Drink – Ardor Huang; Darknet – Dwagie
Best Hakka Album	Best Aboriginal Album
Stay – Lo Ssu-jung; Drifting – Voter Hsu, Huang Wei-chieh, Liu Jung-chang, and Yeh Yu-ting; Return & Restore – iColor; Love for Granted – Gina Yang	Swasieq – Yawai Mawlin; Senglit – Muniyu; Vangav – Cemelesai; Yuan Yin Cheng Xian A Mei Zu Fu Yin Chuan Chang – Wu Chia-lu, Tseng Kuang-fu, Wang Fu-lai, Yang Shih-mei, Lin Jung-mei, and Kuo Mei-yu; Ti Cemelesai Ata Salasaladj – Kerekelj and Eleng
Best Music Video	
"Slow & Oriental" (from Cassa Nova) – Director: Namso and Youkim; "Go Slow" (from Go Slow) – Director: Yuta Sekiyama; "Millennia's Faith Undone" (from Battlefields of Asura) – Director: Birdy Hong and Mo Pan; "Seventeen" (from Seventeen) – Director: Muh Chen; "10 Ways to End" (from Gain) – Director: Namewee; "Good Taiwan" (from South Airport Folks) – Director: Bobby Chen; "Sabrina Don't Get Married Again!" (from Modern Tragedy) – Director: Robert Youngblood; "Ugly Beauty" (from Ugly Beauty) – Director: Muh Chen	
Vocal category – Individual awards
Best Female Mandarin Singer	Best Male Taiwanese Singer
0 – Sandy Lam; Fade to Exist – Eve Ai; Shi's Journey – Shi Shi; Nothing Is Under Control – Yoyo Sham; Ugly Beauty – Jolin Tsai	Warming a Pot of Youth to Drink – Ardor Huang; Jia Jia Jia Jia – Kang Kang; Darknet – Dwagie; Forgotten West – Sam Liao; I Am Not As Happy As You Tonight – Henry Hsu
Best Female Taiwanese Singer	Best Hakka Singer
Snails – Joey Chiang; Fish Out of Water – Kerris Tsai; Tsa-bóo gín-á – Nana Lee; Jazz’s Good! – Emily Kuan; Just You and Me – Hanya Chang	Love for Granted – Gina Yang; Return & Restore – iColor; Stay – Lo Ssu-jung; Ang-gu Ang-gu – Hsieh Yu-wei
Best Aboriginal Singer	Best Band
Swasieq – Yawai Mawlin; Cradle in Memory – Sang Mei-chuan; Vangav – Cemelesai; Maya Maluqem – Kasiwa	Battlefields of Asura – Chthonic; Alter Ego – Pumpkinney Fan Club; Cassa Nova – Sunset Rollercoaster; Fairy Tales of the Ocean Deep – Flesh Juicer; WonFu Love Songs – WonFu; King of Light – Bisiugroup; Him – Tizzy Bac
Best Vocal Group	Best New Artist
Lovely Sunday – The Chairs; I'm Not OK – Vast & Hazy; Some People Say – O-Kai Singers; HighCC – HighCC; Jump – MJ116	ØZI: The Album – ØZI; Town – The Fur.; Wilder – Evangeline Wong; Sha Yan – Karencici; King of Light – Bisiugroup; Campus Romance – Angry Youth; 2029 – Lexie Liu
Best Composition	Best Lyrics
"Forever Young" (from Fade to Exist) – Eve Ai (Performer: Eva Ai); "Hurt" (from Sofa Sea) – Cheer Chen (Performer: Cheer Chen); "The Will" (from Kisses for the World) – Tanya Chua (Performer: Tanya Chua); "Growing Fond of You" (from Half Time) – Li Ronghao (Performer: Karen Mok); "Jade" (from Jade) – Enno Cheng (Performer: Enno Cheng)	"Newly Written Old Song" (from Newly Written Old Song) – Jonathan Lee (Performer: Jonathan Lee); "Millennia's Faith Undone (The Aeon's Wraith Version)" (from Millennia's Faith Undone (The Aeon's Wraith Version)) – Freddy Lim (Performer: Chthonic and Denise Ho); "Rain" (from A Song with No Name) – Bobby Chen (Performer: Bobby Chen); "Angels" (from 0) – Xiao Han (Performer: Sandy Lam); "Know" (from Know) – Song Dongye (Performer: Song Dongye)
Best Music Arrangement	Producer of the Year, Album
"Styx" (from Forgotten West) – An Ton That (Performer: Sam Liao); "Flyaway" (from Shi's Journey) – Chung Wei-yu (Performer: Shi Shi); "Love Me Like a Liar" (from Shi's Journey) – Shi Shi, Howe Chen, Lin Hung-i, Hsu Yu-ying, Chung Wei-yu (Performer: Shi Shi); "B.O." (from ØZI: The Album) – ØZI (Performer: ØZI); "Ghosts & Demons" (from 0) – Chang Shilei (Performer: Sandy Lam); "BKD Club" (from Urban Disease) – Yellow (Performer: Yellow)	L.O.V.E. – Carl Wong (Performer: Eason Chan); Fade to Exist – Chen Chien-chi (Performer: Eve Ai); Nothing Is Under Control – Michael Ning and Yoyo Sham (Performer: Yoyo Sham); Modern Tragedy – Linus of Hollywood, Joanna Wang, and Andrew Page (Performer: Joanna Wang); Fairyland – Arai Soichiro (Performer: Su Yunying)
Producer of the Year, Single	Best Male Mandarin Singer
"BKD Club" (from Urban Disease) – A-Len and Huang Hsuan (Performer: Yellow); "1933" (from Where Are We Going?) – Eli Hsieh and Howe Chen (Performer: Eli Hsieh); "Ugly Beauty" (from Ugly Beauty) – Starr Chen and Jolin Tsai (Performer: Jolin Tsai); "B.O." (from ØZI: The Album) – ØZI (Performer: ØZI); "Stay" (from Stay) – Sandee Chan (Performer: Hebe Tien); "Don't Cry Don't Cry" (from Don't Cry Don't Cry) – Chen Chien-chi and Han Li-kang (Performer: Waa Wei)	Wu Bing Singing, Yo Chin Soothing – Leo Wang; Where Are We Going? – Eli Hsieh; Song of the Bards – Kowen Ko; Ear – Li Ronghao; ØZI: The Album – ØZI
Instrumental category – Record label awards
Best Instrumental Album	
Lines & Stains – Tokyo Chuo-Line feat. Hsieh Ming-yen; Sounds & Savors – Hope Yeh; City Animals – Su Yu-han; Songs of Mystery and Hope – Alex Pryrodny; Black Bear Forest OST Original Soundtrack – Pau-Dull	
Instrumental category – Individual awards
Best Instrumental Album Producer	Best Instrumental Composer
Black Bear Forest OST Original Soundtrack – Pau-Dull; Lines & Stains – Ken Ohtake, Toru Hayakawa, and Noriaki Fukushima; City Animals – Su Yu-han; Xiao Mei Original Motion Picture Soundtrack – Luming Lu; Project 3 – Hsu Yu-ying and Yu Chia-lun	"Chapter III: India, Italy, and I" – Hsu Yu-ying; "Sneezer" (feat. Hsieh Ming-yen) – Toru Hayakawa; "Choice" – Owen Wang; "Journey" – Su Yu-han; "Outside My Window" – Luo Ning
Technical category – Individual awards
Best Recording Package	
Hold That Tiger – Andrew Wong and Yang Fong-ming; Warming a Pot of Youth to Drink – Tsai Shu-yu; Reversing into Garage – Gelresai Chen; King of Light – Huang Po-han, Yang Shi-Ching, and Chen Hsin-hao; In Other Words – Joe Fang and Wu Chien-lung	
Technical category – Record label awards
Best Vocal Recording Album	Best Instrumental Recording Album
0 – Sandy Lam; Sha Yan – Karencici; Ugly Beauty – Jolin Tsai; Matzka Station – Matzka; 2029 – Lexie Liu	The Journey – Wang Chenhuai; Ruby Pan Original Fusion Jazz Album – Ruby Pan; City Explorations – Skyline; 9 – Timeless Fusion Party; Pendulum – Chung Yu-feng
Special Contribution Award
Blacklist Studio
Jury Award
Modern Tragedy – Joanna Wang
