= Wan Sha Lang =

Taiwanese singer and actor (1949–2023)

- 萬沙浪
- Born: Wan Sha Lang; 21 January 1949; Taiwan
- Died: 18 June 2023 (aged 74); Taitung, Taiwan
- Other names: Vansalrang, Wang Zhongyi, Wang Zhong Yi
- Occupations: Singer, actor

Wan Sha Lang (Chinese: 萬沙浪, also spelled Vansalrang; 21 January 1949 – 18 June 2023), known in China as Wang Zhongyi (Chinese: 王忠義), was a Taiwanese singer and film actor of Puyuma descent.

== Life and career ==
An ethnic Puyuma, his name Vansalrang means warrior in Puyuma language. He approached music during his military conscription when he became a trumpeter in the army band. After being discharged, he started a rock band with two friends, and began performing in clubs and hotels. He had his breakout in 1971, when he got a hit with "Love Is an Elusive Wind (風從哪裡來)", the theme song of the film of the same name, and successfully specialized in romantic ballads in Mandarin.

In 1987, Vansalrang went to China to take part in the CCTV Spring Festival, but because of the strict cross-strait policy of that time he was banned from returning to Taiwan; the ban was eventually lifted 8 years later, but at that point his wife and children had moved to the US and had lost contact with him.

Starting from a brain injury in 1997 which caused him a mental degradation to the level of infants, Vansalrang suffered massive health issues, including several strokes, one of them in 2015 paralyzing half of his body and forcing him to be fed through nasogastric intubation. He died on 18 June 2023, at the age of 74.
