= Tuhi Martukaw =

Taiwanese Pinuyumayan activist, journalist, diplomat and educator

Personal details
- Born: Jocelyn Ting-Hui Hung Chien; 1985 (age 40–41) Kasavakan Town, Taitung, Taiwan
- Party: Democratic Progressive Party (2019)
- Education: National Chengchi University (BA); University of Hamburg (PhD)

Tuhi Martukaw or Jocelyn Ting-Hui Hung Chien (Chinese: 洪簡廷卉; pinyin: Hóngjiǎn Tínghuì; Wade–Giles: Hung Chien T'ing Hui) is a Taiwanese Pinuyumayan activist, journalist, diplomat, and educator. She was co-chair of the United Nations' Global Indigenous Youth Caucus from 2010 to 2015 and has represented Taiwan for 10 years at the United Nations Permanent Forum on Indigenous Issues. She is the founder and coordinator of LIMA Taiwan Indigenous Youth Working Group, which works to increase Indigenous youth outreach within Taiwan and foster connections with their international counterparts.

She was selected as the leading candidate on the Democratic Progressive Party's party list ahead of the 2020 Taiwanese legislative election, but was afterwards removed from the list altogether, with the party citing her previous associations with the Kuomintang and her lack of political experience. In addition to her work as an activist and diplomat, Tuhi has worked as an editor, translator, and anchor for Taiwan Indigenous Television, focusing on international news, as well as a board member for the Taiwan Legal Aid Foundation and as an instructor for the University of Taipei.

== Early life and education ==
Martukaw was born as Hung Chien Ting-Hui 1985 in Kasavakan Town, within the city of Taitung, to a Hoklo father and a Pinuyumayan mother. In typical Hoklo fashion, she was given a four character Chinese name. Whereas the name "Tuhi Martukaw" honours her maternal grandmother, who had died prior to when she was born. In the Puyuma naming system, names are given from deceased elders and are given to the individual once they have grown up.

While raised in an Indigenous community, Tuhi was unable to speak the Puyuma language. Tuhi recalled an instance while attending the UNPFII conference in 2006 where she was unable to speak on any issues regarding her Indigenous background compared to her peers. When she returned to Taiwan, she researched Indigenous movements and spent time in her home community during a period of mourning for her maternal grandfather.

Martukaw received a Bachelor of Arts degree in Diplomacy from National Chengchi University and a Master of Arts degree in European Studies at the University of Hamburg. It was through her work at the Department of Diplomacy where she was able to participate in the United Nations Permanent Forum on Indigenous Issues and build the framework for the development of the LIMA Taiwan Indigenous Youth Working Group.

== Career ==
Tuhi works as a board member of the Taipei Legal Aid Foundation and as an instructor at the University of Taipei. A journalist, she works as an editor and news anchor for Taiwan Indigenous Television. She works as an international news translator for the channel. She currently also works as a freelance journalist, and is a member of the Indigenous Media Caucus.

Tuhi is recognized as a leader of the Taiwanese delegation to the United Nations Permanent Forum on Indigenous Issues (UNPFII), having attended meetings for ten years consecutively starting in 2006, she was selected as co-chair of the Global Indigenous Youth Caucus from 2010 to 2015, which was recognized by the UNPFII. She recalled the difficulty in organizing fellow youth, with the caucus only gaining official recognition in 2008. At the United Nations, Tuhi works collaboratively with international Indigenous groups to expand international participation for the Indigenous peoples of Taiwan, despite Taiwan's complicated legal situation. Oftentimes, the Taiwanese delegation is forced to borrow from the resources of allied organizations due to the political status of Taiwan.

Tuhi is the founder and the coordinator of the LIMA Taiwan Indigenous Youth Working Group. Established in 2013, the group works to train and connect Indigenous youth with their counterparts internationally, to contribute in their struggle of attaining rights, and building up capacity in carrying on cultural heritage, equality, and justice. The group additionally works to boost public understanding and increase visibility of issues related to the Taiwanese Indigenous community. LIMA was involved in the Sunflower Student Movement of 2014, holding Indigenous Youth forums at the site of the protest. Prior to her annual trips to the UNPFII, Tuhi organizes workshops around the country to enhance awareness of global and local Indigenous rights issues.

=== Activism ===
Tuhi's activism focuses on the areas of climate change, Indigenous feminism, land issues, and the participation of Indigenous youth in global affairs. Tuhi urged the UNPFII's official translation team (run by China) to remove the term "土住" (translated as "tribal") from its Chinese name, criticizing China's decision on the matter, noting that the term has a pejorative nature within Indigenous communities. She was critical of the United Nations for failures in reporting on the condition of Taiwanese Indigenous peoples, requesting the UN conduct surveys on the sexual violence on Indigenous Taiwanese women and the self-harm and suicide rates of Indigenous youth. Tuhi urged the body to approach the subject with a purely academic and scientific perspective in order to eliminate political interference. She was critical of Taiwanese activists seeking out Indigenous participation to legitimize their own causes without understanding the need for cooperation. She notes that the lack of trust among Indigenous communities is often due to Taiwanese independence activists being opposed to ideas of Taiwanese Indigenous independence. She recalled facing criticism from her relatives for her social activism and opposition to nuclear development, since many in her community economically rely upon the Taiwan Power Company and the Kuomintang. Tuhi represented her community in protests against government regulation that denies Indigenous communities any recourse to fight encroachment by private entities. She stressed that the lack of free, prior and informed consent had allowed for massive developments which split Indigenous peoples' lands.

=== Political career ===
Ahead of the 2020 Taiwanese legislative election, it was announced that Tuhi was to be given the top spot on the Democratic Progressive Party's (DPP) party list. Tuhi had previously worked as a legislator's assistant to a Kuomintang member of the Legislative Yuan. Her placement was surmised by New Bloom Magazine to be the representative of the increasing presence of Indigenous activists within Taiwanese politics, reminiscent of New Power Party's choice of Indigenous journalist Kawlo Iyun Pacidal for a top position within their party list.

However, when the party list was finalized, it was announced during a 14 November news conference that she was not given the spot. The DPP claimed that the removal was because of Tuhi's lack of political experience, but it was alleged in New Bloom Magazine that her removal was a result of factional deal making. Tuhi was believed to be the pick of Premier Su Tseng-chang. The DPP had removed younger candidates such as Tuhi in order to court older candidates who had left the party for the Formosa Alliance and the Taiwan Independence Action Party. She was additionally criticized for her previous work under a Kuomintang legislator and her work within Premier Su's Eball Foundation; a claim was also spread that she was involved in a case of fraud.

== Personal life ==
Among the local Indigenous youth activist community she is called "Sis", overseas Indigenous activist peers refer to her as "Jocelyn", while Taiwanese Indigenous peers and relatives call her "Jinumu".
