= Elephant Gym =

Taiwanese jazz fusion band

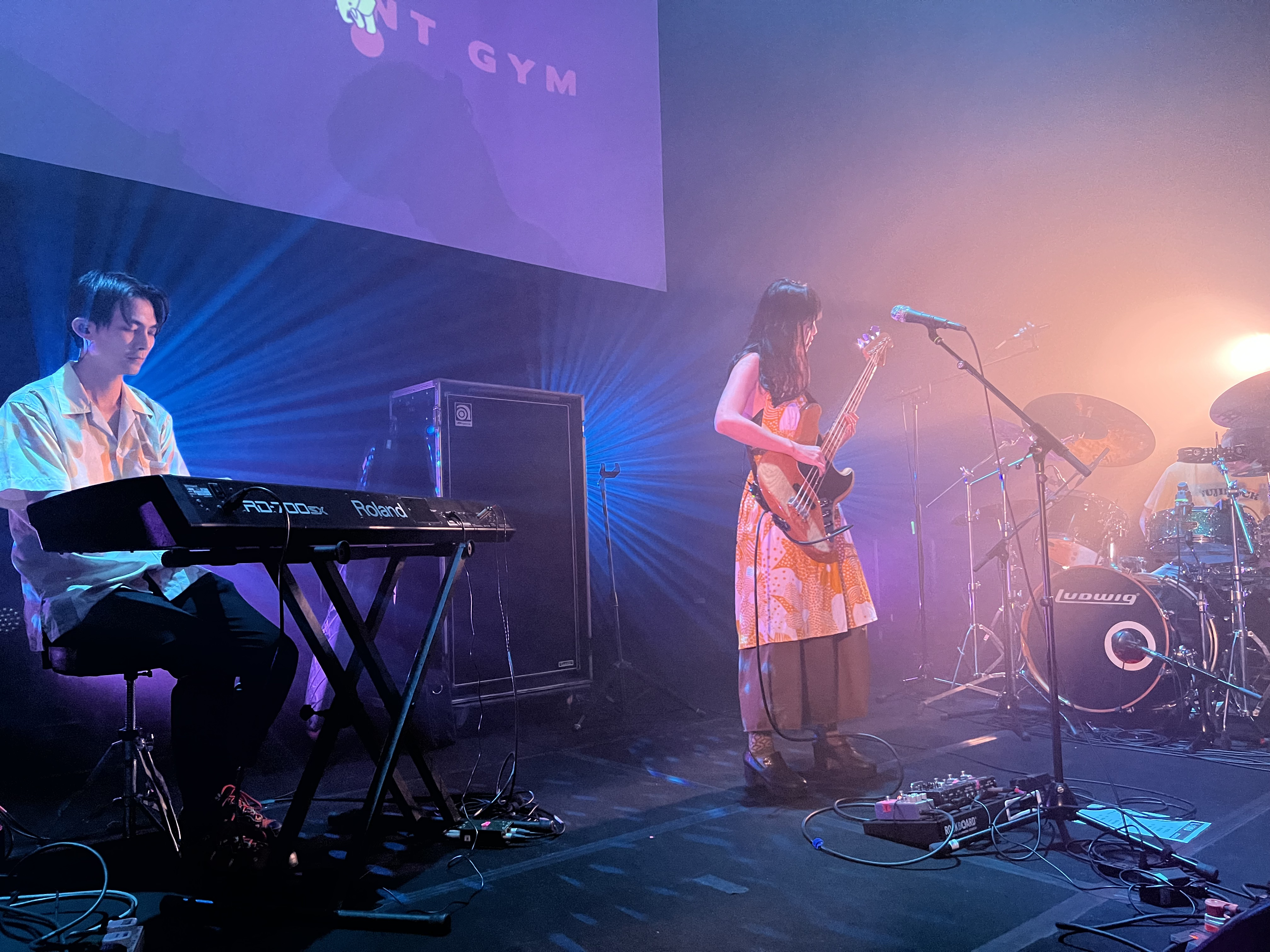
- Elephant Gym in 2023

Background information
- Origin: Kaohsiung, Taiwan
- Genres: Jazz fusion; math rock
- Years active: 2012–present
- Label: Topshelf
- Members: KT Chang (張凱婷); Tell Chang (張凱翔); Chia-Chin Tu (涂嘉欽)
- Website: https://elephantgym.co/

Chinese name
- Traditional Chinese: 大象體操
Transcriptions

Elephant Gym (Chinese: 大象體操) is a jazz fusion and math rock band from Kaohsiung, Taiwan, founded in February 2012. The group consists of multi-instrumentalist siblings KT Chang and Tell Chang, and drummer Chia-Chin Tu. The word "elephant" in the band name symbolizes their bass-driven melodies, and "gym" refers to their agile and irregular rhythms.

== History ==
=== Formation, Balance, Angle and hiatus (2014–2016) ===
As children, KT and Tell Chang were trained in classical music by their mother, while Chia-chin Tu learned classical percussion. After the siblings met Tu at a music club in high school, the trio formed Elephant Gym in February 2012, hand-produced a limited edition EP, and toured Taiwan on the single "Ordinary Route" (later released on their album Angle). On May 8, 2013, the band released Balance, their first EP, which included the song "Ocean in the Night" which was produced in collaboration with Hom Shenhao, the lead singer of indie band Touming Magazine. In 2014, they collaborated with Yoga Lin on a song, "Speaking in Tongues", which they performed with him in Hung Hom, Hong Kong and at the Taipei Arena.

In June 2014, their debut album Angle was released, with singles featuring Panai Kusui and Enno Cheng. In December 2014, the group members announced a year long hiatus due to Taiwanese compulsory military service, and held a performance entitled See You Then in addition to a short documentary of the same name. In the meantime, KT went on to form the band Felix Felicis (小福氣) alongside Enno Cheng.

=== Post-hiatus: Work EP and Underwater (2016–2018) ===
In August 2016, their earlier work Angle was released in Japan and the group was invited to participate in the Summer Sonic Festival. The group released their second EP Work in October 2016, followed by a tour of Taiwan in small venues. In June 2017, the group was invited to Tokyo to play with American math rock band The Fall of Troy and special guest Hikes. The band played in the Megaport Music Festival in 2018.

In November 2018, they released their second full-length album Underwater followed by a world tour, which included a performance at SXSW and a live session at Audiotree. In August 2019, they performed at the ArcTanGent Festival.

=== Dreams and World (2019–present) ===
They released the single "Gaze at Blue" on 18 October 2019. Their 3rd album, Dreams (夢境) was released on 11 May 2022. On 3 November 2023, they released the single "Jhalleyaa" in collaboration with Indian-Canadian singer Shashaa Tirupati. Their 10 year anniversary album World (世界) was released on 14 December 2025. On 30 May 2025, their live album Live in The World was announced to be released in late 2025. Film director Alulu Kuo followed the band and released a documentary titled More Real Than Dreams (2026).

== Band members ==
- KT Chang (張凱婷) - bass guitar, keyboards, vocals
- Tell Chang (張凱翔) - guitars, keyboards, backing vocals
- Chia-Chin Tu (涂嘉欽) - drums, percussion

== Awards ==
Year	Award	Category	Recipients	Result	Ref.
2013	4th Golden Indie Music Awards	Best New Band	Balance	Nominated	
2014	5th Golden Indie Music Awards	Best Style Category Album	Angle	Won	
2014	5th Golden Indie Music Awards	Best Album	Angle	Nominated	
2014	5th Golden Indie Music Awards	Best Band	Elephant Gym	Nominated	
2014	5th Golden Indie Music Awards	Best Musician	KT Chang (張凱婷), bass	Nominated	
2014	5th Golden Indie Music Awards	Best Musician	Chia-chin Tu (涂嘉欽), drums	Nominated	
2014	5th Golden Indie Music Awards	Best Rock Single	"Whistle"	Nominated	
2014	5th Golden Indie Music Awards	Best Jazz Single	"Body"	Nominated	
2014	5th Golden Indie Music Awards	Best Style Category Single	"Games"	Nominated	
2017	8th Golden Indie Music Awards	Best Style Category Single	"Spring Rain"	Nominated	
2019	10th Golden Indie Music Awards	Best Band	Elephant Gym	Won	
2019	10th Golden Indie Music Awards	Best Album	Underwater	Nominated	
2019	10th Golden Indie Music Awards	Best Musician	KT Chang (張凱婷), bass and synthesizer	Nominated	
2019	10th Golden Indie Music Awards	Best Rock Single	"Underwater"	Nominated	
2019	10th Golden Indie Music Awards	Best World Music Album	Underwater	Nominated	
2019	10th Golden Indie Music Awards	Best World Music Single	"Half"	Nominated	

== Discography ==
=== Studio albums ===
Balance (平衡) [2013]
No.	Title	Featured artist	Length
1.	"Finger"		5:02
2.	"Ocean in the Night" (夜洋風景)	Hom Shenhao (洪申豪)	4:54
3.	"Dance Together" (一起跳舞)		2:03
4.	"Galaxy" (銀河)		5:04
Total length:			17:03

Angle (角度) [2014]
No.	Title	Featured artist	Length
1.	"Intro" (序)		1:05
2.	"Day Time" (白日)	Enno Cheng (鄭宜農)	4:14
3.	"Games" (遊戲)		4:05
4.	"Light" (燈)		2:56
5.	"Strong Ladder" (堅固耐用的梯子)		3:44
6.	"Ordinary Route" (日常的航道)		5:08
7.	"Head" (頭)		0:56
8.	"Body" (身體)		4:09
9.	"Frog" (青蛙)		5:12
10.	"Whistle" (鳥鳴)		4:31
11.	"Swan" (天鵝)	Panai Kusui (巴奈)	10:13
Total length:			46:13

Work (工作) [2016]
No.	Title	Length
1.	"Mirror" (鏡子)	0:38
2.	"Midway" (中途)	3:59
3.	"D"	4:09
4.	"Spring Rain" (春雨)	4:26
5.	"Celebrate" (慶)	2:41
Total length:		15:53

Underwater (水底) [2018]
No.	Title	Featured artist	Length
1.	"Shower" (陣雨)		1:39
2.	"Underwater" (水底)		4:00
3.	"Satellite" (人造衛星)		3:45
4.	"Half Asleep" (彌留)		1:30
5.	"Bad Dream" (噩夢)	Sowut	4:57
6.	"Half" (半個)		4:24
7.	"Shell" (順從的殼)	Cudjiy Ija Karivuwan (張威龍)	3:41
8.	"Lake" (湖)		0:59
9.	"Quilt" (被子)	Kento Nagatsuka (長塚健斗)	4:18
10.	"Walk" (散步)		4:36
11.	"Speechless" (走在沒說完的話裡)		0:36
12.	"Moonset" (月落)	Yeye	3:31
Total length:			37:56

Dreams (夢境) [2022]
No.	Title	Featured artist	Length
1.	"Anima" (阿尼瑪)		2:40
2.	"Go Through the Night" (穿過夜晚)		3:49
3.	"Shadow" (影子)	9m88	3:45
4.	"Witches" (女巫)		3:51
5.	"Dreamlike" (如夢一般)		3:36
6.	"Wings" (振翅)	Kaohsiung City Wind Orchestra (高雄市管樂團)	3:51
7.	"Happy But Sad"		1:59
8.	"Deities' Party" (眾神的派對)	Chio Tian Folk Drums & Art Troupe (九天民俗技藝團)	3:05
9.	"Dear Humans [JP Version]" (敬啟者)		3:42
10.	"Gaze at Blue [Album Version]" (凝視)		3:54
11.	"Fable" (托夢)	MC JJ	2:57
12.	"Dream of You" (發夢到你)	Lin Sheng Xiang (林生祥)	4:09
Total length:			41:18

World (世界) [2023]
No.	Title	Featured artist	Length
1.	"Jhalleyaa (Note: Omitted in some releases.)"	Shashaa Tirupati	4:18
2.	"Feather" (羽毛)	Whyte (壞特)	3:51
3.	"Adventure" (探險)		2:33
4.	"Flowers" (花束)		0:48
5.	"Name" (名字)	Seiji Kameda (亀田誠治)	3:16
6.	"Galaxy [Orchestra Version]" (銀河)	Kaohsiung City Wind Orchestra (高雄市管樂團)	5:48
7.	"Light [Orchestra Version]" (燈)	Kaohsiung City Wind Orchestra (高雄市管樂團)	2:58
8.	"Ocean in the Night [Orchestra Version]" (夜洋風景)	Kaohsiung City Wind Orchestra (高雄市管樂團) & Hom Shenhao (洪申豪)	5:00
9.	"Happy Prince" (快樂王子)	Yile Lin (林以樂)	4:19
10.	"Feather" (羽毛)	Tendre	3:52
Total length:			36:43 (Note: 32:25 without Track 1.)

=== Singles ===
- Gaze at Blue (2019)
- Dear Humans (2020)
- Go Through the Night (2021)
