= Summer's Tail =

- Film poster
- Directed by: Cheng Wen-tang
- Written by: Enno; Jan Fu-ha; Cheng Wen-tang
- Produced by: Tsui Siuming
- Starring: Ray Chang; Dean Fujioka; Enno; Hannah Lin
- Cinematography: Lin Cheng-ying
- Edited by: Lei Chen-ching
- Music by: Aphasia; Enno
- Production companies: Green Light Film; Sundream Motion Pictures
- Release dates: October 5, 2007 (Hong Kong Asian Film Festival); November 1, 2007 (Hong Kong); November 16, 2007 (Taiwan)
- Running time: 98 minutes
- Country: Taiwan
- Language: Mandarin

Summer's Tail (Chinese: 夏天的尾巴) is a 2007 Taiwanese film directed by Cheng Wen-tang (鄭文堂). The movie was filmed entirely in Tainan.

== Plot ==
In the eyes of her classmates, Yvette Chang (Enno) is a rock and roll girl, she has a cat by the name of "Summer", because of a congenital heart condition, she has left school and spends much of her time every day with Summer messing around, playing the guitar, and getting out and about. During the time when she is not in school, every day is filled with discovery, and since the specially gifted and talented class's student Jimmy Chan (Ray Chang), fell in love with a teacher, and met the fate of being expelled from the school, now the streets have one more high school student on the roam. Yvette willingly opens her arms to embrace all of Jimmy's emotions, and comfort him. But Jimmy doesn't quite understand why Yvette, who suffers from cardiac disease, is so full of ambition and warmth for living.

Two high school drop-outs are out riding bicycles, when between the rice paddies and the irrigation canals, they find a place free from the control of adults, an undeveloped piece of land near the tracks of the Taiwan High Speed Rail. Under the blue skies, they gather with their classmates from the same school, another gifted and talented student named Wendy (Hannah Lin) and the Japanese exchange student Akira (Dean Fujioka) who loves soccer but is always the last in academic, and together at this secret base they relax, have fun, and fool around. The destiny which has brought the four of them together serves as a powerful force of empathy and encouragement, as they enjoy fun times together, and try to save an embittered suicidal father. Against the backdrop of clear skies, reflecting the visions and secrets lodged in the hearts of four almost grown up children, whether life is normal or exciting, with success or failure, they are always able to enjoy the experience.

This demonstrates the ability to experience joy in living, which is a gift, similar to a tail that can be wagged for enjoyment when time permits from other tasks. Actually, individuals possess a tail intended to maintain happiness.

What is the purpose of that tail? Finding your own happiness.

== Cast ==
- Ray Chang as Jimmy Chan
- Dean Fujioka as Akira Fuwa
- Enno as Yvette Chang
- Hannah Lin as Wendy Lin
- Christine Ke Huan-ju as Xiu I-Wei
- Lu Yi-ching as Yvette's mother
- Yao Hsiao-min as Boss
- James Wen Sheng-hao as Willy's Father
- Li Hsiu as Yvette's grandmother
- Chen Chih-chieh as Willy
