= Cheng Wen-tang =

Taiwanese director and producer

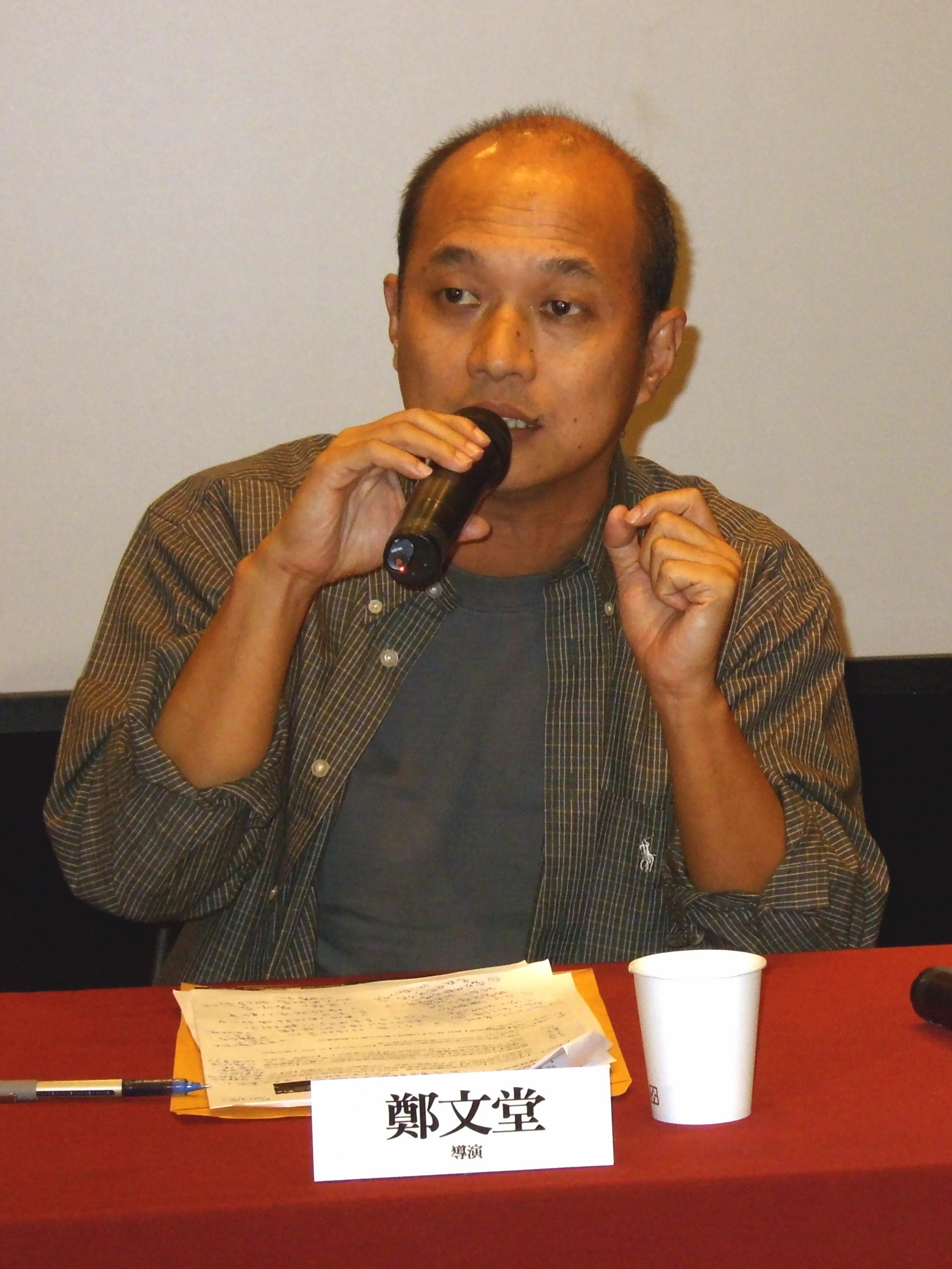
- Cheng in 2007
- Born: 1958 (67–68); Yilan County, Taiwan
- Education: Chinese Culture University
- Family: Enno Cheng (daughter)

Cheng Wen-tang (Chinese: 鄭文堂; born 1958) is a Taiwanese director and producer. He got his start creating documentaries on social movements in 1980s Taiwan. He began creating narrative films in the 1990s and has gone on to collaborate with his daughter, singer Enno Cheng, on several projects.

He has served president of the Kaohsiung Film Festival and is a part-time assistant-professor level teacher at National Chengchi University.

== Early life ==
Cheng was born in Yilan County, Taiwan in 1958 and grew up in Luodong. He graduated from Chinese drama school of the Chinese Culture University.

== Career ==
Cheng got his start in filmmaking making documentaries, with a focus on social movements in 1980s Taiwan. He made his first television film debut with Lanyang River Youth (1998).

Cheng's first collaboration with his daughter, Enno Cheng, was on Badu's Homework. The short film was her writing debut at 16 and won Best Short at the 2003 Golden Horse Awards.

Cheng began serving as president of the Kaohsiung Film Festival in 2004.

The National Palace Museum commissioned Cheng to produce a short film with a NT$8,000,000 budget. Given the size of the budget, he convinced the museum to turn the project into a feature length film that could be released commercially; Cheng brought in another NT$1,000,000 for the budget. The Passage later earned NT$1,100,000 at the box office and was entered into the Tokyo Film Festival.

His second feature Somewhere Over the Dreamland (2002) is about two Aboriginal Taiwanese men's adventure in urban Taipei. It was screened at the 59th Venice International Film Festival as part of the International Critics' Week section.

Cheng has taught at National Chengchi University's College of Communications as an assistant-professor level contracted teacher since 2012.

Cheng and Chang Yih-feng collaborated on the music video for "Supreme Pain for the Tyrant", Chthonic's song from their 2013 album Bu-Tik.

== Style and themes ==
Cheng has expressed an admiration for realism, specifically the works of authors Huang Chun-ming and Chen Yingzhen and director Ken Loach.

== Personal life ==
Cheng is the father of singer-songwriter Enno Cheng.

== Filmography ==
Year	Title	Original title	Director	Notes/Ref.
1998	Lanyang River Youth			Television film
1999	Postcard		Yes	short
2002	Somewhere Over the Dreamland	夢幻部落	Yes	
2003	Badu's Homework		Yes	short
2004	The Passage	經過	Yes	
2005	Blue Cha Cha	深海	Yes	
2007	Summer's Tail	夏天的尾巴	Yes	
2009	Tears	眼泪	Yes	
2011	10+10			20 5-minute short films; "Old Man & Me" segment
2015	Maverick	菜鳥	Yes	
2017	Tshiong	衝組	Yes	

== Awards and nominations ==
Year	Award	Category	Work	Result	Notes
2009	46th Golden Horse Awards	Best Original Screenplay	Tears	Nominated	along with Cheng Jin Fen and Chang I-Feng
2010	Taipei Film Awards	Best Director	Tears	Won	
