= Palakuan =

Men-only clubhouses in Taiwan

Palakuan refers to the men-only clubhouses and its institutions for military education and tribal public affairs of Puyuma (Peinan) which is an aboriginal matriarchal society in South-eastern Taiwan. Recently in December 2008, Palakuan was used by Deng Liberty Foundation (鄭南榕基金會) as the name of a web platform for groups and individuals with interests in indigenous and global issues about social and political reform in Taiwan.

== See also ==
- Taiwanese indigenous peoples
