= Sam Liao =

Taiwanese singer-songwriter (born 1976)

Sam Liao 廖士賢
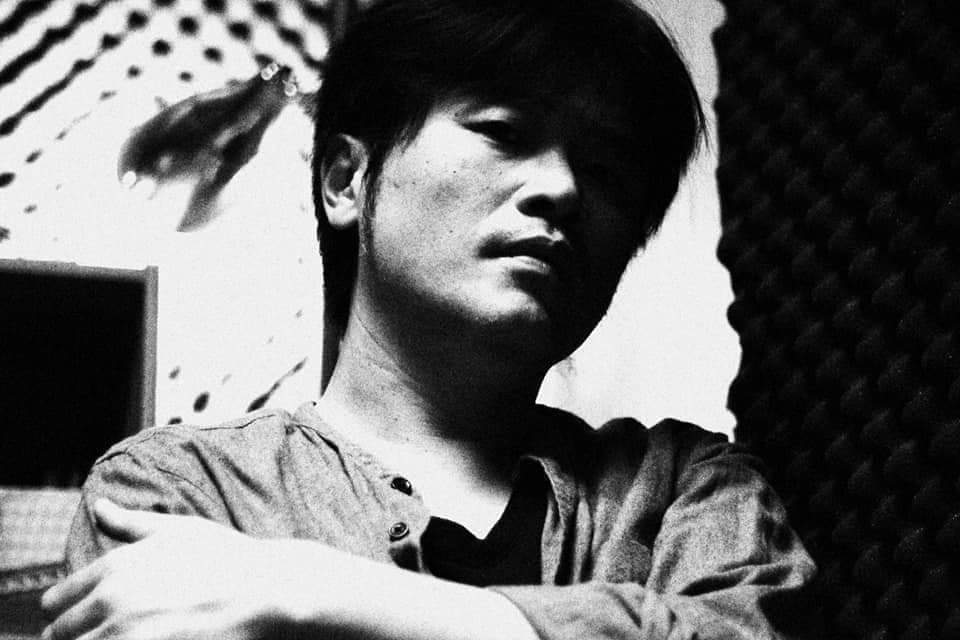
- Liao in 2021

Background information
- Born: May 15, 1976 (age 49); Taiwan
- Genres: Mandapop, new Taiwanese experimental, rock, lyrical
- Occupations: singer-songwriter, lyricist, music producer
- Instruments: Acoustic guitar, electric guitar, piano, bass, jazz drums
- Years active: 2002–present
- Partner(s): Father: Liao Fengnan; Mother: Lin Liqing

Sam Liao (Mandarin: 廖士賢; born May 15, 1976) is a Taiwanese singer-songwriter. He was the winner of the Best Taiwanese Album award at the 30th Golden Melody Awards and Best Songwriter at the 10th Golden Indie Music Awards. In 2019, he was awarded as the first Outstanding Citizen of Chiayi City and composed a song titled "Chiayi". In November 2022, he released his fifth album, "Into" (Mandarin: 入).

== History ==
Born May 15, 1976, Liao is the oldest of two siblings in a family that has been in the electrical appliance business for many years, and his parents had hoped that he would inherit the family business. Beginning in 1994, he taught himself how to play the guitar in high school and sang in a restaurant, and 1996, he went to Banqiao East Asia Institute of Technology, where he was enrolled. 1997, he formed a band with his classmates called "Taiwan Colors" (Mandarin: 角頭), and was the lyricist and electric guitarist of the band, which was an underground rock band, He is an underground rock musician and listens to Nirvana, Radiohead, Oasis, The Verve, and many others. The band was renamed "Retailer" (Mandarin: 散戶) after the formation of "Taiwan Colors Music" (Mandarin: 角頭音樂), and enlisted in the Kaohsiung Zuoying District Marine Corps in April 1999.

In 2001, Liao moved north and worked at a record store and sold glow sticks at Nangang 101 to make a living, and started recording the demo "Lane 37"(Mandarin: 37巷). In March 2002, he started recording his first album at Taiwan Colors Music Studio, and his song "Love Movie" (Mandarin: 愛情電影片) was included in Matilda Tao's album "Youth" (Mandarin: 青春). In December of the same year, his debut album "Perfect World" (Mandarin: 完美世界) was released, and the song "Looking for Love"(Mandarin: 找愛) from this album was used in the ending song of the documentary film "Bluffing Three Little Boys" (Mandarin: 唬爛三小) directed by Huang Hsin-Yao in 2005. He also sang with Quarterback on the song "Raining on me" (Mandarin: 雨呷呢大).

After releasing his second album "Unexpected" (Mandarin: 料想不到) in 2007, Liao did not release an album for 8 years, and kept himself in the studio to practice music. One day, he received a phone call from Ric Huang, the King of Golden Taiwanese Songs, who gave him the courage to try to make an album, and thanked his musical predecessors in his heart.

On December 30, 2016, Liao released his third album "The Door" (Mandarin: 門), and in 2017, he was shortlisted for "Best Taiwanese Male Vocalist" at the 28th Golden Melody Awards, and established Sam Studio (Mandarin: 山畝音樂文化工作室) . on September 29, 2018, he was invited to perform live at the Presidential Palace, and in December, he released his fourth album "The West" (Mandarin: 西部), which featured music arranged by the Vietnamese-French composer and pianist Aakenand Taiwanese musician Blaire Ko. In February 2019, she interpreted the theme song of Da Ai Television's "The Taste of Beetroot Stalks" (Mandarin: 菜頭梗的滋味), "River and Mountain Have Dreams"(Mandarin: 江山有夢) . In May, "West" was honored as one of the Top 10 Albums of 2018 by the Chinese Musicians Exchange Association. In June, he was awarded the 30th Golden Melody Award for the Best Taiwanese Album, and Aaken was honored with the Best Arranger Award.

In August 2019, Liao was invited to re-arrange the German ballad, "Wild Rose" for Our Theatre's "Marriage and a Cattle Cart" (Mandarin: 嫁妝一牛車). On August 22, Aaken was invited to participate in the Minxiong Taishiye Cultural Festival. On September 7, Aaken attended the Arts and Culture Tea Party of the Chinese Cultural Federation at the Taipei Hotel and sang the song. In November, Aaken was honored as the Best Songwriter in the 10th Golden Indie Music Awards. On December 31, Aaken participated in the "All Chia Artists' New Year's Eve Gala" at Chiayi Municipal Gymnasium.

In May 2020, Liao growth and musical works were selected as a question for the English test of junior high school. In August, she was a judge for the Taiwan Original Pop Music Award, and in September, she was a judge for the solo and duet categories of the 37th National Chengchi University Golden Spin Awards, and he gave advice and encouragement to all the finalists. In October, he was invited to participate in the Clermont-Ferrand International Short Film Festival in France for the song "Far Away" (Mandarin: 遙遠的所在) from his album "West".

In November 2020, Liao was invited by illustrator Animal (Mandarin: 阿尼默) to read from the Taiwanese poetry picture book "Love Pieces" (Mandarin: 情批) and produce an animated soundtrack, which she accomplished by using his heartfelt voice that was close to the emotions in the book, along with a musical solo arranged by piano, strings, electric guitar, and rhythm drums. In May 2021, Animal won the Jury's Merit Award for "Poetry of the Year" at the Bologna Children's Book Fair in Italy for "Love Pieces", and he was very happy and proud of the award, which is a clear indication of their good friendship.

In 2021, coinciding with the 100th anniversary of the Taiwan Cultural Association, Museum of National Taipei University of Education held the exhibition "The Art Historical Objective and Planning of Lumière: The Enlightenment and Self-Awakening of Taiwanese Culture", and Liao was invited to record the audio guide in Taiwanese, and produced two songs, "Light's Progress" (Mandarin: 光の行進) and "Light's Hiding" (Mandarin: 光の隱藏).

In May 2022, Liao participated in the Cannes Film Market Exhibition in France with his video work "Eternal Life" (Mandarin: 永生) conceptual film. On September 17, he participated in the Chiayi City Rock Music Festival press conference, and at the same time, held a rock celebrity concert in the Concert Hall of the Cultural Affairs Bureau of the Chiayi City Government. In November, he released his fifth album, In, a collaboration with Vietnamese-French musician Aaken and Taiwanese musician Blaire Ko.

In May 2023, Liao was shortlisted for the "Best Taiwanese Male Vocalist" at the 34th Golden Melody Awards, and on May 27, he was selected as an Outstanding Alumnus by his alma mater, Chiayi Xinghua Middle School.

== Award record ==
=== Golden Melody Awards ===
Year	Session	Album	Award	Finalist	Result
2016	27th Golden Melody Awards	Taiwan New Wave (台語新浪潮)	Best Taiwanese Album	Taiwan New Wave (台語新浪潮)	Nominated
2017	28th Golden Melody Awards	The Door (門)	Best Taiwanese Male Vocalist	The Door (門)	Nominated
2019	30th Golden Melody Awards	The West (西部)	Best Album of the Year	The West (西部)	Nominated
2019	30th Golden Melody Awards	The West (西部)	Best Taiwanese Male Vocalist	The West (西部)	Nominated
2019	30th Golden Melody Awards	The West (西部)	Best Taiwanese Album	The West (西部)	Won
2019	30th Golden Melody Awards	The West (西部)	Best Arrangement	Aaken, Far Away (遙遠的所在)	Won
2023	34th Golden Melody Awards	Into (入)	Best Taiwanese Male Vocalist	Into (入)	Nominated
2023	1st Wave Music Awards	Into (入)	Best Minnan Language Album	Into (入)	Nominated

=== Other Awards ===
1. 2005 Taiwan Original Pop Music Awards, 2nd Hailuolong Group Best Work
2. 2006 Taiwan Original Pop Music Awards, 3rd Hailuoluong Group
3. 2006 MÜST Chinese Music Copyright Intermediary Association Distinguished Member
4. 2015 The 1st Taiwanese New Wave Lyricist Champion
5. 2017 The 8th Golden Indie Music Award Finalist [Best Folk Single Award]
6. 2018 Taiwan Original Pop Music Award, 15th Hailuo Language Group Best Work
7. 2019 Chinese Musicians Exchange Association [Top Ten Albums of 2018]
8. 2019 10th Golden Indie Music Awards [Best Composition Singer]

== See also ==
- Sam Liao | Facebook
- Sam Liao YouTube
- Sam Liao Instagram
- Sam Liao StreetVoice
