= Puyuma Pulingaw =

Pulingaws are known as shamans for the Taiwanese indigenous peoples of Puyuma and Paiwan, which in general would share the same roles as the Puyuman pulingaw with some distinctions. Pulingaws are, claimed to be, selected by their electing ancestors known as kinitalian, who often turn out to be the pulingaws' ancestors, which happen to also be another form of spiritual entity called birua. Kinitalians can choose whoever they please as the next pulingaw amongst its immediate or extended family members. Although females were often selected to continue the line of shaman-ism, not all pulingaws are female and there were rare instances where males were selected to take up the role. However, the pulingaw's gender issue is still an ongoing debate as certain sources insist that only females become pulingaws. The pulingaws are considered as therapists, who are responsible for mediating and bringing peace to social and biological disorders. They are also responsible for various rituals that range from hunting ceremonies, exorcisms and funerals.

== Role ==
The pulingaws are considered to be above other mainstream therapists and they have a significant social status of their own within the Puyuma community. They are bestowed the role of averting and curing biological and sociological maladies and at the same time pleasing their electoral spirits, kinitalian.

The pulingaws do not receive former training and they are expected to learn their skills by following and imitating what their fellow senior pulingaws would be doing. Their job involves visiting their clients' houses when requested and providing them with spiritual healing processes. Pulingaws are also expected to participate in an annual ritual, known as pualasakan, which happens during the third day of the third moon. The ritual lasts for eight days during which, the pulingaws perform chants, self-purification using water, ridding their sanctuary of miasma, and on the last night of pualasakan, punlingaws would perform their 'words of offering' and be in the yaulas stage, which is a divine stage that allows the pulingaws to connect with their ancestors' biruas. Pualasakan rituals also include another individual that deals with the supernatural, known as the benabulu, who is often a man.

Different pulingaws have somewhat similar practices and languages. They also perform the yaulas ritual where they perform the yaulas rite and incarnate birua(s) in order to deal with either biological or sociological events. These dealings may pose neutral, beneficial or even detrimental effects. For example, for biological events, if an individual's tinabawan (one of the three souls of an individual) is affected by their ancestral birua, who would most likely be offended or annoyed by the individual's behaviour or actions, the pulingaw would try to summon the birua and rectify the situation. During such rituals, areca nuts and fired clay beads are often used to summon birua or even for exorcising purposes. The areca nuts are also used as repellents for vengeful spirits, who are either animals or birua who had an unpleasant life prior to their deaths or they carried vengeful intentions during the deaths.

The main reason why most elected individuals refuse to become a pulingaw is the need to cope with having a double life. Since most pulingaws are females, they are required to carry out their expected roles such as cooking and childcare. Since they have been bestowed with the fate, she also has to attend to patients, whom she cannot refuse unless she is severely ill or injured and that her predicament inhibits her from commuting towards other locations. At times, there would be a need for these pulingaws to leave their own house to attend to housecalls during the day, and they do not return home until late in the next morning.

The pulingaws, however, do expect some form of payment from their patients as their birua have informed them that they do not agree to doing 'unpaid' work and if no payment was received, the pulingaw would be the one suffering the punishment from the birua, as mentioned in the previous paragraph that the birua is often summoned to deal with an individual's torment or suffering. These payments used to come in the form of a few coins or areca nuts since fees are paid according to their clients' discretion. Hence, payment can come in any form, even a gift, and as long as there is a payment, the birua would remain content.

== Origins ==
It was claimed that there was, initially, only one shaman, known as Samguan, an effeminate man, and it was him that formalised shaman-ism within the Puyuma. Samguan's elector birua loved him so much that he did not suffer what most of the successive shamans suffered prior to his investiture. His investiture process was, in fact, an interesting one. He claimed that while he was ploughing the fields, his birua dropped a bag (that he proceeded to use as part of his yaulas rituals) from the sky and it landed close to his feet and thus accepted his role as a pulingaw the moment he picked up the bag. Today, pulingaws carry an exact replica of this bag (also known as an aliut) everywhere they go.

It was mentioned that prior to Samguan's existence, there were only miapali, who were known as people 'with the evil eye'. These people were often feared and are expected to socially confine and isolate themselves from the rest of the society, to prevent any form of contact (mostly visual). Although people who associate themselves with the supernatural such as the miapali have existed for a long period of time, it was rather surprising to note that formalised ritualistic practitioners as the pulingaws did not exist until the end of the 19th century as Samguan was only 25 when the Japanese arrived in Taiwan in 1895. This claim, at some extent, caused a number of debates amongst the shamans in the past as some pulingaws do believe and claim that another pulingaw known as Udekaw should be considered as the first shaman instead.

The reason behind Samguan's well-attained status could most likely be due to his contribution in preventing the Japanese administration in Taiwan from completely annihilating the tribe's shamans and their practices. His intervention was perhaps not conducted directly against the Japanese administration in the form of a confrontational war, but rather in the form of secret gatherings and classes. It was through these gatherings or classes that Samguan conveyed his knowledge to the next generation of pulingaws. In order to suit their practices to the environmental contexts then, the pulingaws would have to be constantly aware of their surroundings and avoid getting caught by the Japanese. For example, in order to avoid being caught by the Japanese, rituals such as the pualasakan would only take place once a year whenever but before that, these rituals took place whenever or wherever there were small issues like illnesses.

== Selection ==
Electing ancestors (kinitalian) were said to visit their selected candidates through various ways and eventually have these candidates go through investitures that make them official pulingaws. Electing ancestors would in some instances select individuals based on personal preference but these individuals must be descendants of the electing ancestor. Once selected (prior to their acceptance of the role), these candidates would often succumb to various experiences ranging from extreme physical pain that cannot be cured through modern means of medication. Others have also complained of severe headaches and for female pulingaws, some even complained that their kinitalians were so relentless that their (kinitalian) fury had caused the women to have miscarriages. These troubles may in some instances, also be afflicted upon the candidates' families, especially when the birua is annoyed or furious at the candidates for refusing their fate. Thus, in other words, selected pulingaw candidates cannot refuse their calling and they must reveal their biruas' calls.

Once these candidates have accepted their fate of becoming a pulingaw, life for most pulingaws were often said to be better as their kinitalian no longer disturb them and provide them with blessings. However, there are also exceptions where candidates accepted the role but suffered misfortune events and in some instances led to their deaths. These resulting misfortunes were often associated with the pulingaws' reluctance to fully commit themselves to their pulingaw calling by either abandoning their faith or more importantly, refuse to partake in the annual pualasakan ritual. As a result, they were punished by their kinitalian through a series of calamity.

== Male pulingaw stereotypes ==
Prior to the Japanese's arrival, the Puyuma tribe had a strong hunting culture and being part of hunting activities was often seen as a masculine role that most males are expected to partake in. However, effeminate males, also known as a fortiori, who do not partake in tribal hunting activities would often turn out to be pulingaws. These effeminate male pulingaws are in a way similar to the Samoan concept of fa'afafine, and some of them do in fact have children. The concept of homosexuality never existed within the Puyuma community and male pulingaws are still seen as men that would fulfil the appropriate gender roles when it comes to having sexual relations with another person, which would be women.

Considering the fact that the concept of pulingaws is rather new, previous effeminate men were perhaps classified as miapalis as they did not fit in well with social expectations. They were also, perhaps, considered as mialigu, who has the power to become or even make things around them become invisible. Hence, both miapali and mialigu were believed to be part of the social concepts that traditional Puyumans used to reject individuals that do not seem to meet societal expectations or predisposed Puyuman gender roles. This would, however, require more studies to confirm the existing questions regarding such claims.

There is another possible explanation for the current state of female-dominated pulingaw practices. The Puyumas were previously a shaman-hunting society where men were in charge of shaman rituals and hunting. Eventually, as Puyuman men focused more on agricultural practices (considered a shameful practice for men), they left the shamanistic practices to mostly women. This social demographic change eventually became permanent during the Japanese administration when hunting was forbidden.
