= Enno Cheng =

Taiwan actor and singer

- 鄭宜農
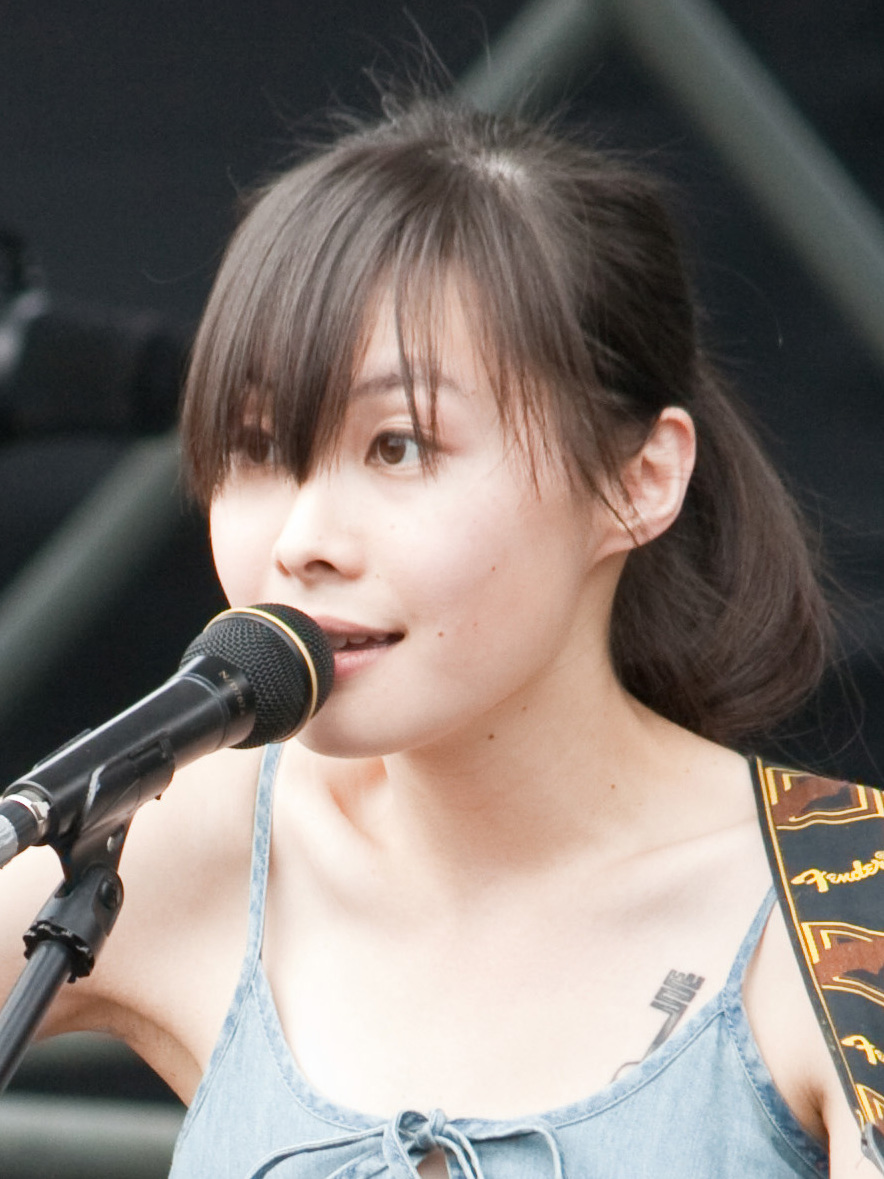
- Cheng in 2011
- Born: Cheng Yi Nung; 19 March 1987 (age 39); Yilan County, Taiwan
- Other names: Enno, Enno Zheng, Zheng Yi-Nong
- Occupations: Film actor; singer-songwriter; author
- Years active: 2007–present
- Spouse: Sam Yang (m. 2013; div. 2016)
- Parent: Cheng Wen-tang (鄭文堂)

Enno Cheng (Chinese: 鄭宜農; pinyin: Zhèng Yínóng) is a Taiwanese indie singer-songwriter who is also an author and a film actress. She is currently part of the band Chocolate Tiger (猛虎巧克力) in addition to performing and releasing albums solo. She is the daughter of film director Cheng Wen-tang, who she often collaborates with by writing screenplays and film scores as well as performing in his films.

== Career ==
She attended Tamkang University and majored in Chinese, but took a leave of absence in 2007.

She first appeared in the film industry in 2007 in the film Summer's Tail, where she portrayed the main character Yvette Chang. She also composed and wrote for the film. Her performance was praised in The Hollywood Reporter although the film itself was panned. She was also nominated for the Best New Performer award at the 44th Golden Horse Awards for her role. She was cast as Wen, a betel nut beauty, in the 2009 film Tears.

Her debut album "Neptune" (海王星) was released by White Wabbit Records in July 2011.

She performed on 30 August 2019 in Kuala Lumpur as part of an official musical exchange spearheaded by Taiwan's Ministry of Culture between Taiwan and Malaysia, along with math rock band Elephant Gym, Formosan aboriginal singer Chalaw Passiwali, and Malaysian band Pastel Lite. She was slated to perform at SXSW 2020, but the event was cancelled due to the outbreak of COVID-19 pandemic in the United States.

In 2023, Cheng won Best Female Singer in Taiwanese and Best Album in Taiwanese at the 34th Golden Melody Awards.

== Personal life ==
Cheng married Sam Yang, the lead singer for band Fire EX. in 2013. They amicably divorced in 2016, at which time she announced that she was gay.

== Activism and politics ==
In 2009, Cheng posed for photographer Clive Arrowsmith as part of the "T for Tibet" campaign, in which celebrities were photographed forming the letter "T" with their hands, along with other Taiwanese musicians Fire EX., Panai Kusui, and Chthonic.

Due to the COVID-19 pandemic, Cheng gave a performance remotely for the inauguration of President Tsai Ing-wen's second term.

In May 2020, Cheng recorded a track for the album T-POP: No Fear In Love, a compilation album celebrating the one-year anniversary of the legalization of same-sex marriage in Taiwan, with others including 9m88.

== Filmography ==
=== Films ===
- Summer's Tail 夏天的尾巴 (2007)
- Tears 眼淚 (2009)
- Maverick (2015)

=== Television ===
- Green Door (2019)
- The Mirror (2019)

== Discography ==
=== Solo albums ===
- Neptune (2011)
- Pluto (2017)
- Dear Uranus (2019)
- Mercury Retrograde (2022)
- Moon Phases (2025)

=== Albums with Chocolate Tiger ===
- Nighttime Factory (夜工廠) (2013)
- YI-CHUN (怡君) (2015)

== Bibliography ==
- Summer's Tail (2007)
