= Samingad =

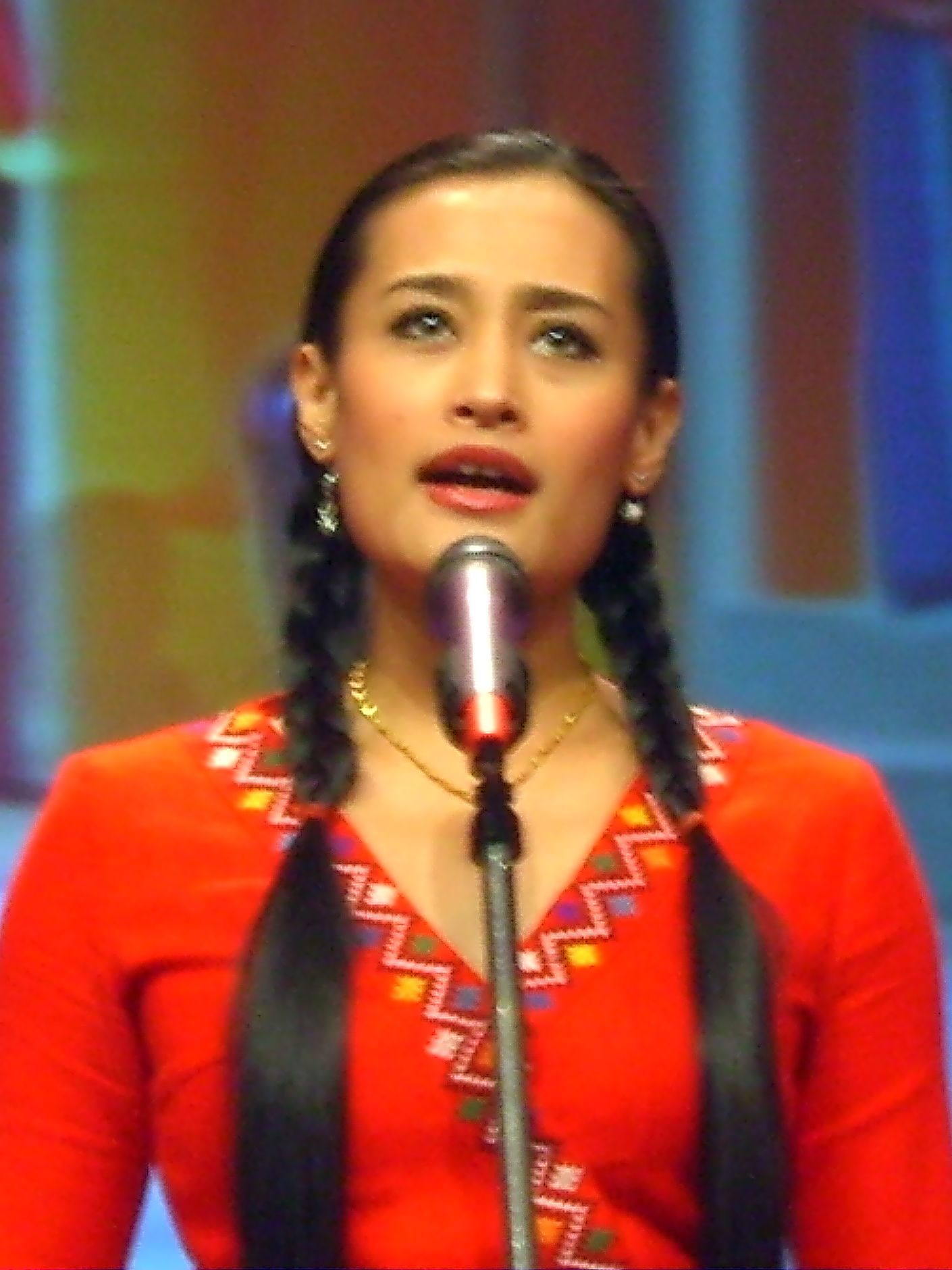
- Samingad at the 2006 Taiwan Sports Elite Awards
- Born: Samingad Purepurepuan; 2 October 1977 (age 48); Taitung County, Taiwan
- Occupation: Singer
- Years active: 1997–present
- Awards: Golden Melody Awards – Best New Artist; 1999 太陽 風 草原的聲音; Best Dialect Female Vocalist; 2001 野火春風
- Musical career
- Origin: Taiwan
- Genres: Hokkien pop, Indigenous Pop
- Labels: Taiwan Colors Music Co., Ltd. Taiwan
- Website: Samingad@TCM Taiwan

Samingad Purepurepuan (born 2 October 1977), known professionally as Chi Hsiaochun (Chinese: 紀曉君; pinyin: Jì Xiǎojūn; Wade–Giles: Chi Hsiao-chün; zhuyin:ㄐㄧˋ ㄒㄧㄠˇㄐㄩㄣ) is an aboriginal Taiwanese pop singer and songwriter. She is an ethnic Puyuma, whose name means "unique". She was born in Taitung County, to a father of Bunun descent and a mother of Puyuma descent. Her uncle is Purdur, the winner of the Best Mandarin Male Singer of the 11th Golden Melody Awards. Her younger sister, Jia Jia, is also a singer.

Samingad was discovered while singing in a restaurant, where she worked as a waitress. Her first album "Voice of Puyuma" was released with Magic Stone Records and received a Golden Melody Award for "Best New Artist" 1999. In 2001 she received a Golden Melody Award for "Best Dialect (Non-Mandarin Language) Female Vocalist" for her second album "Wild Fire, Spring Wind". Her music draws much of its inspiration from the Christian Gospels, as well as from tales of the tribe's former agricultural and hunting lifestyle, and from the complex emotions triggered by Puyuma's struggles in Taiwan's contemporary society.
