= Panai Kusui =

Taiwanese singer-songwriter, guitarist and social activist

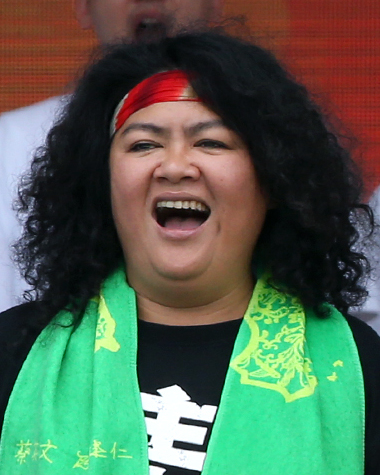
Panai Kusui

Panai Kusui (Chinese: 巴奈·庫穗; pinyin: Bānài Kùsuì; Chinese name: Chinese: 柯美黛; pinyin: Kē Měidài; born 1969) is a Taiwanese singer-songwriter, guitarist and social activist. Her parents are of the Puyuma and Amis tribes of southeastern Taiwan.

== Music career ==
Panai's first album "ni-wa-wa" was released in 2000 and received an award as one of the top 10 albums of the year by the China Times.

Panai has performed at Tiehua Music Village in Taitung City, which was established by the Lovely Taiwan Foundation to promote indigenous music and culture. She also performed at the fifteenth Migration Music Festival in 2017.

In 2024, Panai won the Golden Melody Award for Best Taiwanese Album for Iā-Pô (夜婆). During her acceptance speech, Panai mentioned the 1989 Tiananmen Square protests and massacre, and her comments were censored from the internet in China.

== Activism ==
Panai supported Democratic Progressive Party candidate Tsai Ing-wen in the 2016 Taiwanese presidential election campaign, voicing her support for Tsai, whose grandmother was Paiwan. Panai sang aboriginal songs at Tsai's campaign rallies and post-election victory events, including Tsai's investiture. Panai, at these events, voiced the need of formal apologies to aboriginal peoples for past abuses. Elected president, Tsai fulfilled these requests and presented formal apologies to aboriginal populations.

In February 2017, Tsai Ing-wen's government declared a series of public lands as aboriginal ancestral territories. Panai denounced the moves as insufficient since it did not return lands previously taken and now owned by private entities, including notorious mines. Panai's objection was based on two principles: the right of surviving aboriginal tribes to get back their whole territories, and the request for autonomy consistent enough so aboriginal community could negotiate as equals with the government. Panai was one of the leaders of the Indigenous Ketagalan Boulevard protest concerning the delineation of traditional lands of Taiwanese aborigines. On February 23, she occupied using tents the grass ground facing the Presidential Office Building, but was moved out 100 days later, installing herself near a metro entrance, and after 600 (January 2019) had to move again to a nearby park. During the protest, Panai won an appeal against a fine levied by the Taipei City Government, and continued camping until the presidential inauguration of William Lai.

Panai Kusui has also participated in commemorations of the February 28 incident and supported the 2019–20 Hong Kong protests.

== Discography ==
- ni-wa-wa (泥娃娃) — 2000, TCM
1. 泥娃娃 Ni Wa-Wa
2. 不要不要討好 Me Myself
3. 流浪記 Wandering
4. 浮沈 Floating, Sinking
5. 捆綁 Tied Up in Knots
6. 大武山美麗的媽媽 My Beautiful Mother, Da-Wu Mountain
7. 過日子 Sometimes
8. 失去你 Gone is Gone
9. 天堂 Heaven
10. 你知道你自己是誰嗎 Do You Know Who You Are?
11. 怎會會這樣 Why？
12. 每一天 Every Day's Dream
- Pur-dur & Panai Unplugged Live — 2001, TCM
1. I'm Happy Because You're Happy
2. Ho-ai-yE-yan
3. Tied Up in Knots
4. Talking
5. Why?
6. Rice Wine
7. My Beautiful Mother, Da-Wu Mountain
8. Memories of Orchid Island
9. Talking
10. Yi-na-pa-yiu-ddia
11. Talking
12. MuMu's Blue
13. Rain and You
14. Relaxed and Happy
15. Ho-yi-na-lu-wan
16. Tai-ba-lang Folksong
- A Piece of Blue
1. 海歸 (Sea return)
2. 媽媽請你不要放心 (Don't worry mama)
3. 我 (Me)
4. Talaluki
5. 我和自己 (Me and myself)
6. 看到你的臉 (When I see your face)
7. 愛!愛!愛! (Love you!)
8. 飄 (Drifting)
9. 停在那片藍 (A piece of blue)
10. Afternoon
