= Puyuma people =

Indigenous ethnic group in Taiwan

Pinuyumayan
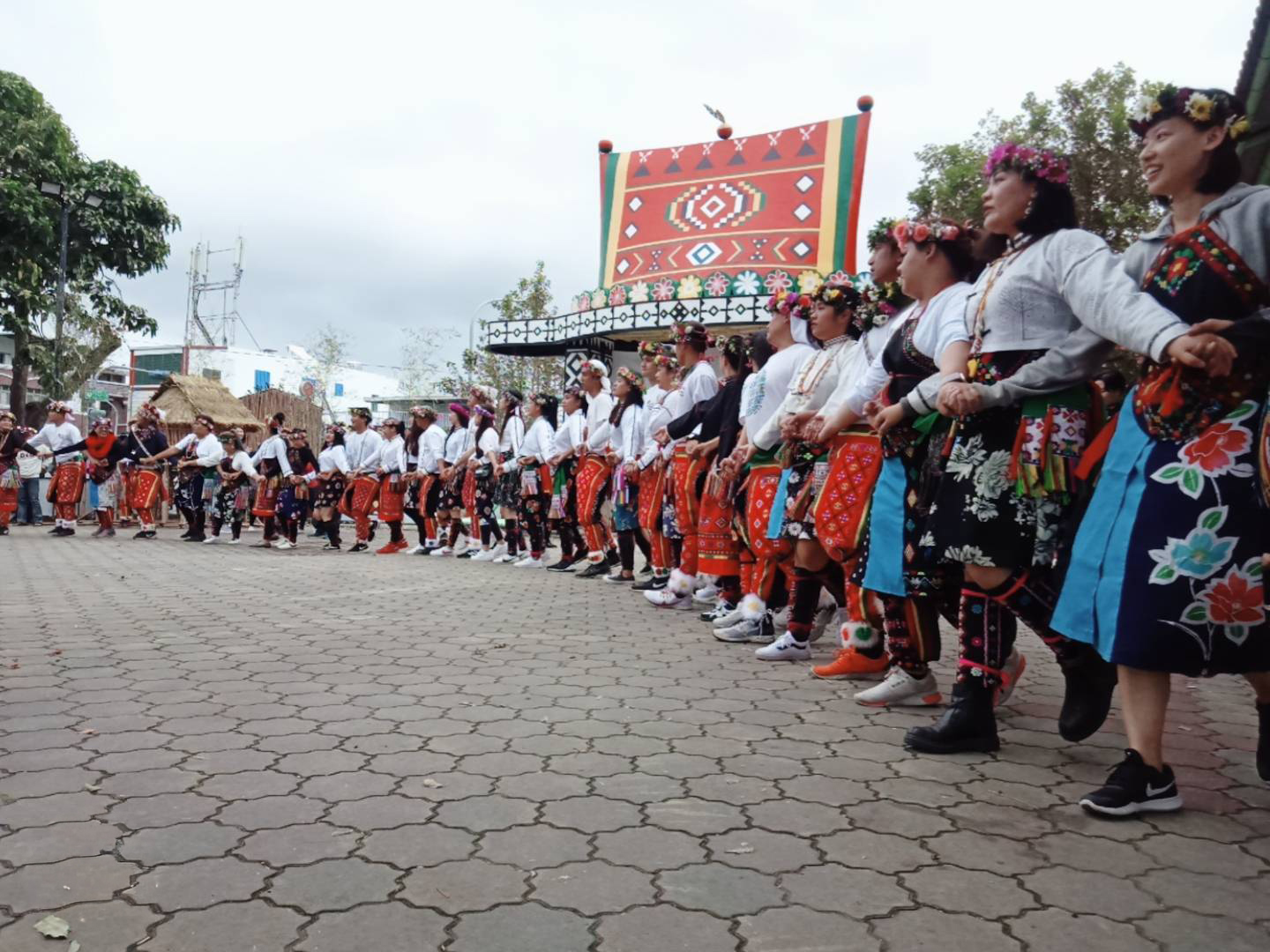

Total population
- 14,081 (Jan 2018)

Regions with significant populations
- Taiwan

Languages
- Puyuma, Mandarin, Hokkien

Religion
- Animism, Christianity

Related ethnic groups
- Taiwanese indigenous peoples

The Puyuma (Chinese: 卑南族; pinyin: Bēinánzú; Pe̍h-ōe-jī: Piu-má cho̍k, Pi-lâm cho̍k), also known as the Pinuyumayan, Peinan or Beinan, are one group of Taiwanese Indigenous peoples. The people are generally divided into the Chihpen and Nanwang groups, both resident in Taitung County on the east coast of Taiwan.

In the year 2000, the Puyuma numbered 9,606. This was approximately 2.4% of Taiwan's total indigenous population, making them the sixth-largest indigenous group. The Puyuma speak the Puyuma language, as well as Mandarin and Taiwanese Hokkien.

The name "Puyuma" means "unity" or "concord" and was originally the autonym of the speakers of the Nanwang dialect. Zeitoun and Cauquelin (2006) also note that the word Puyuma can be analyzed as pu'-uma, which means "to send to the field".

== Culture ==
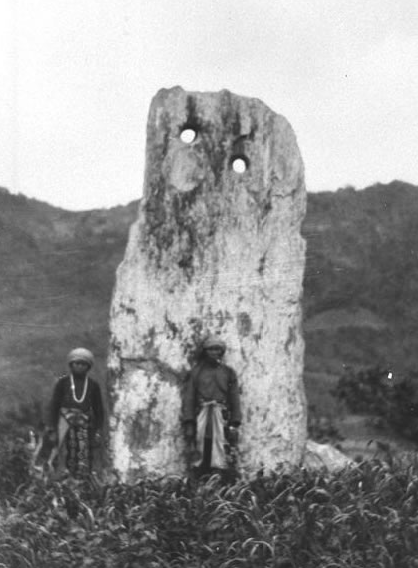
Monolith from the Beinan culture

=== Clothing ===
The traditional clothing of the Puyuma people is a vibrant tapestry of colors, patterns, and distinctive garments that play an important role in expressing cultural identity and societal roles. The clothing is designed with a combination of red, yellow, and green hues, as well as black and white. It features a multi-layered diamond pattern resembling snake scales, accompanied by subtle cross-stitch designs for added detail. Although most of the Puyuma people nowadays wear the western style clothes, traditional attire still predominates during significant holidays and festivals.

The ethnic group's clothing varies across different age levels, with a more significant transition of clothes for men. Boys and men, aged 13–21, wear simple attire during strict training, featuring a plain blue blouse and a short skirt tied with a red belt. Upon reaching marriageable age (over 22 years), they start to wear more attractive clothes to catch attention from women. They wear dark blue or black ensembles with cross-stitch patterns, a green belt, bells belt attached on the back, a sword worn at the waist, and a betel nut bag. Attire is then accessorized with glass beads or silver breast ornaments. A white headscarf and crown of flowers sahaputan completes the look. In old age (60 years), men shift to a sleeveless waistcoat lumbaw and a square hat kabun, symbolizing their transition to the Elder category.

Women wear the same long-sleeved cropped bodice as men, except the color is bright blue or white. The bodice is paired with a bagelup, a small apron usually black (sometimes white) with a front embroidered pocket. In old age, the bagelup is replaced by the sugun, an apron tied at the waist with a pink belt. The lower attire then features a black underskirt with subtle embroidery, topped by an open skirt crossing on the left side, revealing inner skirt embroidery. Additionally, the lower part of the legs are covered with two rectangles of embroidered black cloth secured by four straps around the calves. Women wear a variety of accessories, including silver bells, Japanese coins, bead headbands, silver hairpins, chest ornaments, silver and bead bracelets. The crown of flowers mentioned in the context of men, remains an integral part of women's attire, as well.

== Villages ==
Puyuma villages include (located in Beinan Township and Taitung City):

- Ulibulibuk
- Bankio
- Alipai
- Pinaski
- Tamalakaw
- Rikabung
- Puyuma (Nanwang)
- Peinan
- Balangaw
- Apapalo
- Kasabakan
- Katipul
- Nirbuaqan

== Notable Puyuma people ==
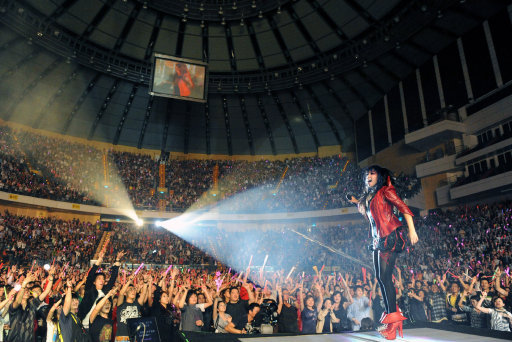
A-mei

- A-mei, Mandopop singer
- Paelabang Danapan, Vice President of Control Yuan
- Saya Chang, singer (and A-mei's younger sister)
- Wan Sha Lang, Mandopop singer and actor
- Erica Chiang, singer
- Jane Huang, singer of Taiwanese rock duo Y2J
- Samingad, singer
- Jia Jia, singer
- Purdur, singer
- Panai, singer
- Tank, singer
- Tuhi Martukaw, activist, journalist, diplomat, and educator
- Sangpuy Katatepan Mavaliyw, Puyuma language singer
- Baday, author
- Kuciling Katatepan, traditional carver
- Iming, sculptor

== See also ==
- Demographics of Taiwan
- Palakuan
- Puyuma Pulingaw
- Taiwanese indigenous peoples
