= Puyuma language =

Austronesian language spoken in Taiwan

Puyuma
- Pinuyumayan
- Native to: Taiwan
- Ethnicity: Puyuma people
- Native speakers: 8,500 (2002)
- Language family: Austronesian: Puyuma
- Writing system: Latin (Puyuma alphabet)

Language codes
- ISO 639-3: pyu
- Glottolog: puyu1239
- ELP: Puyuma
- Linguasphere: 30-JAA-a
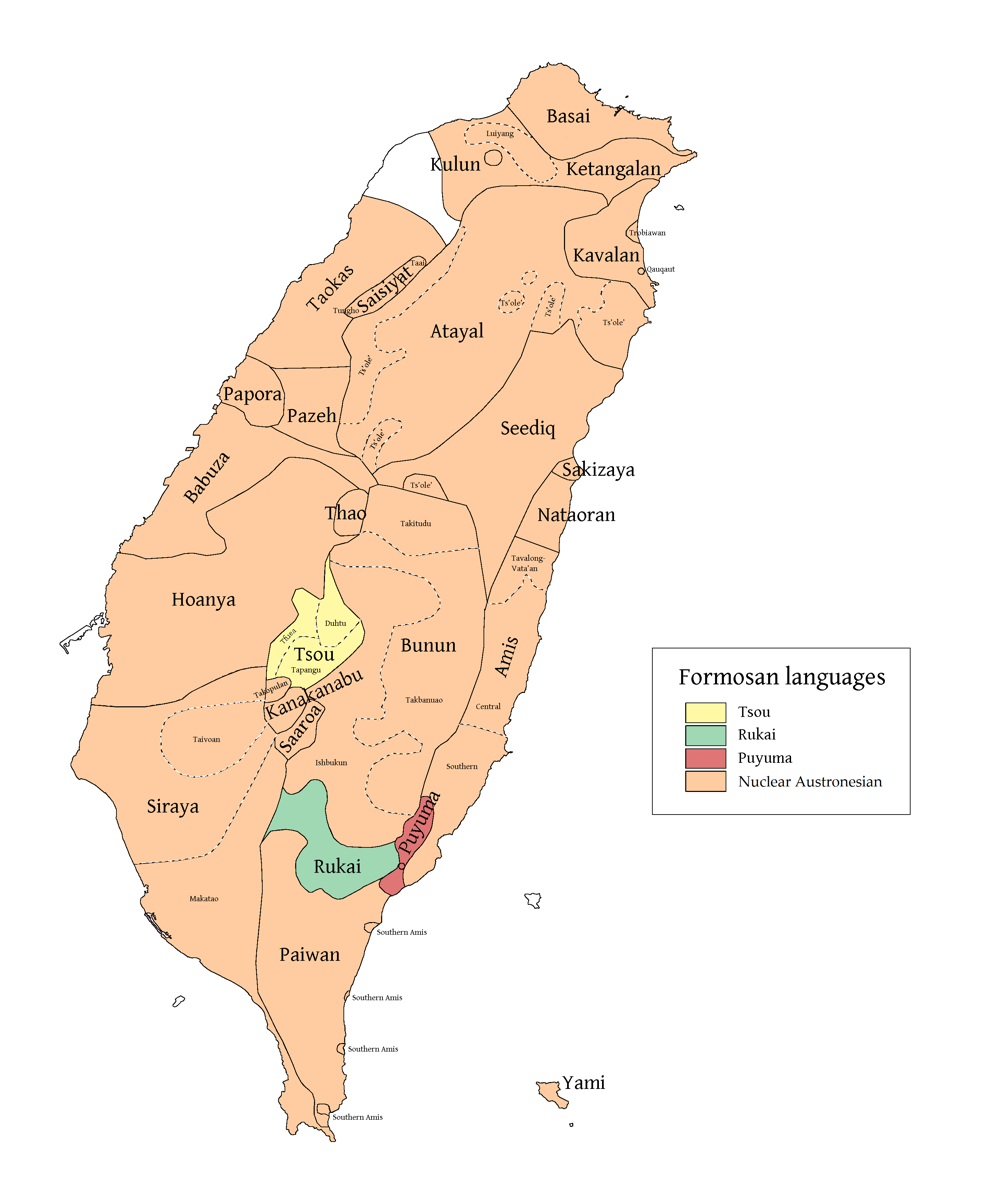
- (red) Puyuma

- Puyuma is classified as Vulnerable by the UNESCO Atlas of the World's Languages in Danger

The Puyuma language or Pinuyumayan (Chinese: 卑南語; pinyin: Bēinányǔ), is the language of the Puyuma, an indigenous people of Taiwan. It is a language of the Austronesian family. Most speakers are older adults.

Puyuma is one of the more divergent of the Austronesian languages and falls outside reconstructions of Proto-Austronesian.

== Dialects ==
The internal classification of Puyuma dialects below is from Ting (1978). Nanwang Puyuma is considered to be the relatively phonologically conservative but grammatically innovative, as it preserves proto-Puyuma voiced plosives but syncretizes the use of both oblique and genitive case.

- Proto-Puyuma
  - Nanwang
  - (Main branch)
    - Pinaski–Ulivelivek
      - Pinaski
      - Ulivelivek
    - Rikavung
    - Kasavakan–Katipul
      - Kasavakan
      - Katipul

Puyuma-speaking villages are:

Puyuma cluster ('born of the bamboo')

- Puyuma (Chinese: Nanwang 南王)
- Apapulu (Chinese: Paosang 寶桑)

Katipul cluster ('born of a stone')

- Alipai (Chinese: Pinlang 賓朗)
- Pinaski (Chinese: Hsia Pinlang 下賓朗); 2 km north of Puyuma/Nanwang, and maintains close relations with it
- Pankiu (Chinese: Pankiu 班鳩)
- Kasavakan (Chinese: Chienhe 建和)
- Katratripul (Chinese: Chihpen 知本)
- Likavung (Chinese: Lichia 利嘉)
- Tamalakaw (Chinese: Taian 泰安)
- Ulivelivek (Chinese: Chulu 初鹿)

== Phonology ==
Puyuma has 18 consonants and 4 vowels:

Puyuma consonants
		Bilabial	Alveolar	Retroflex	Palatal	Velar	Glottal
Nasal		m	n			ŋ ⟨ng⟩	
Plosive	Voiceless	p	t	ʈ ⟨tr⟩		k	ʔ ⟨ʼ⟩
Plosive	Voiced	b	d	ɖ ⟨dr⟩		ɡ	
Fricative			s				
Trill			r				
Approximant			l ⟨lr⟩	ɭ ⟨l⟩	j ⟨y⟩	w	

Puyuma vowels
	Front	Central	Back
Close	i		u
Mid		ə ⟨e⟩	
Open		a	

Note that Teng uses ⟨lr⟩ for /ɭ/ and ⟨l⟩ for /l/, swapping their values in the official orthography. The official orthography is used in this article.

== Grammar ==
=== Morphology ===
Puyuma verbs have four types of focus:

1. Actor focus: Ø (no mark), -em-, -en- (after labials), me-, meʔ-, ma-
2. Object focus: -aw
3. Referent focus: -ay
4. Instrumental focus: -anay

There are three verbal aspects:

1. Perfect
2. Imperfect
3. Future

There are two modes:

1. Imperative
2. Hortative future

Affixes include:

- Perfect: Ø (no mark)
- Imperfect: Reduplication; -a-
- Future: Reduplication, sometimes only -a-
- Hortative future: -a-
- Imperative mode: Ø (no mark)

Verb conjugation example for trakaw "to steal"
		Active	Patient	Locative	Causative
Realis	Unmarked	tremakaw	trakawaw	trakaway	trakawanay
Realis	Progressive	trematrakaw	tratrakawaw	tratrakaway	tratrakawanay
Realis	Durative	trematratrakaw	tratratrakawaw	tratratrakaway	tratratrakawanay
Irrealis		tratrakaw	tratrakawi		tratrakawan
Imperative		trakaw	trakawi	trakawu	trakawan
Hortative		tremakawa	—		

=== Syntax ===
Puyuma has a verb-initial word order.

Articles include:

- i – singular personal
- a – singular non-personal
- na – plural (personal and non-personal)

=== Pronouns ===
The Puyuma personal pronouns are:

Puyuma personal pronouns (free)
Type of pronoun	Nominative	Oblique: direct	Oblique: indirect	Oblique: non-subject	Neutral
1s.	nanku	kanku, kananku	draku, drananku	kanku	kuiku
2s.	nanu	kanu, kananu	dranu, drananu	kanu	yuyu
3s.	nantu	kantu, kanantu	dratu, dranantu	kantaw	taytaw
1p. (incl.)	nanta	kanta, kananta	drata, drananta	kanta	taita
1p. (excl.)	naniam	kaniam, kananiam	draniam, drananiam	kaniam	mimi
2p.	nanemu	kanemu, kananemu	dranemu, drananemu	kanemu	muimu
3p.	nantu	kantu, kanantu	dratu, dranantu	kantaw	–

Puyuma personal pronouns (bound)
Type of pronoun	Nominative (subject)	Nominative (possessor of subject)	Genitive
1s.	=ku	ku=	ku=
2s.	=yu	nu=	nu=
3s.	–	tu=	tu=
1p. (incl.)	=ta	ta=	ta=
1p. (excl.)	=mi	niam=	mi=
2p.	=mu	mu=	mu=
3p.	–	tu=	tu=

=== Affixes ===
The Puyuma affixes are:

Prefixes

- ika-: the shape of; forming; shaping
- ka-: stative marker
- kara-: collective, to do something together
- kare-: the number of times
- ki-: to get something
- kir-: to go against (voluntarily)
- kitu-: to become
- kur-: be exposed to; be together (passively)
- m-, ma-: actor voice affix/intransitive affix
- maka-: along; to face against
- mara-: comparative/superlative marker
- mar(e)-: reciprocal; plurality of relations
- mi-: to have; to use
- mu-: anticausative marker
- mutu-: to become, to transform into
- pa-/p-: causative marker
- pu-: put
- puka-: ordinal numeral marker
- piya-: to face a certain direction
- si-: to pretend to
- tara-: to use (an instrument), to speak (a language)
- tinu-: to simulate
- tua-: to make, to form
- u-: to go
- ya-: to belong to; nominalizer

Suffixes

- -a: perfective marker; numeral classifier
- -an: nominalizer; collective/plural marker
- -anay: conveyance voice affix/transitive affix
- -aw: patient voice affix/transitive affix
- -ay: locative voice affix/transitive affix
- -i, -u: imperative transitive marker

Infixes

- -in-: perfective marker
- -em-: actor voice affix/intransitive affix

Circumfixes

- -in-anan: the members of
- ka- -an: a period of time
- muri- -an: the way one is doing something; the way something was done
- sa- -an: people doing things together
- sa- -enan: people belonging to the same community
- si- -an: nominalizer
- Ca- -an, CVCV- -an: collectivity, plurality
