= A-Mei discography =

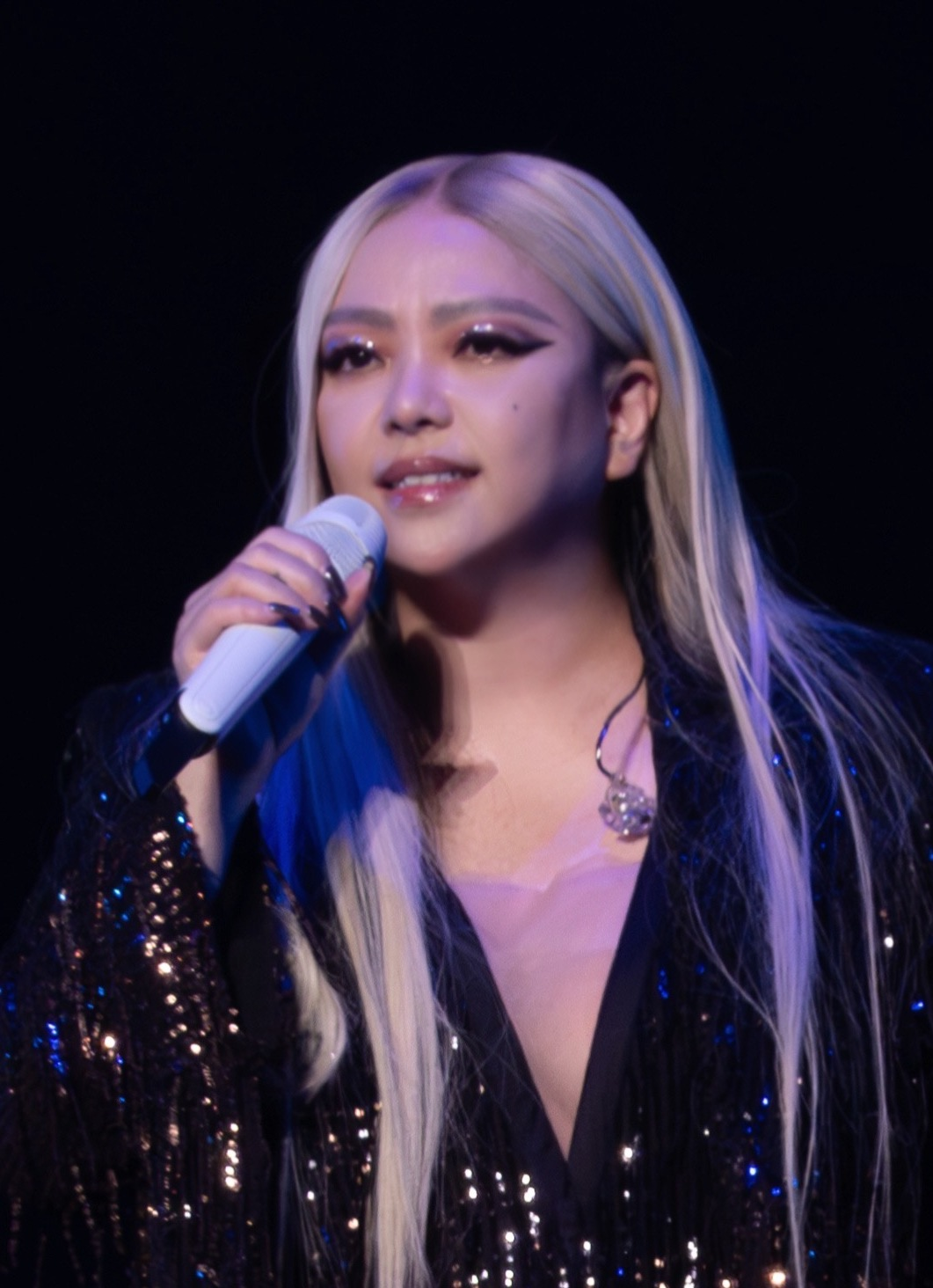
- A-Mei in 2024
- Studio albums: 18
- EPs: 4
- Compilation albums: 6
- Live albums: 17

The discography of Taiwanese singer A-Mei consists of 19 studio albums, 4 extended plays, 6 compilation albums, and 17 live albums. She released her debut album, Sisters, in 1996, which sold over 1 million copies in Taiwan and 4 million copies in Asia. Her sophomore record, Bad Boy, (1997) was also commercially successful and sold over 1,300,000 copies in Taiwan, and remains the highest selling album in Taiwan to date. Her fifth studio album, Can I Hug You, Lover? (1999), sold over 1,180,000 copies in Taiwan and 8 million copies throughout Asia.

Three of her albums have been certified 3× Platinum+Gold by the Recording Industry Foundation in Taiwan (RIT). A-Mei's twelfth studio album, I Want Happiness? (2006), saw commercial success following her cross-straits controversy, selling over 160,000 copies and Taiwan and 2 million copies in Asia. Her eighteenth album, Story Thief (2017), received a gold certification from the Recording Industry Association Singapore (RIAS). Having sold over 50 million albums throughout her career, A-Mei is the best selling female artist in Taiwanese music history.

== Studio albums ==
List of studio albums, with release date, label, and sales shown
Title	Album details	Peak chart positions			Sales	Certifications
Title	Album details	TWN	HK	MLY	Sales	Certifications
Sisters	Released: December 13, 1996; Label: Forward Music; Formats: CD, cassette	1	10	—	Asia: 4,000,000; TWN: 1,210,000	RIT: 3× Platinum+Gold; IFPI HK: Gold
Bad Boy	Released: June 7, 1997; Label: Forward Music; Formats: CD, cassette	1	—	—	Asia: 6,000,000; TWN: 1,380,000	RIT: 3× Platinum+Gold
You Make Me Free Make Me Fly!	Released: December 29, 1997; Label: Forward Music; Formats: CD, cassette	3	—	—	Asia: 4,000,000; TWN: 800,000	
Holding Hands	Released: October 12, 1998; Label: Forward Music; Formats: CD, cassette	1	5	9	Asia: 5,000,000; TWN: 1,100,000	RIT: 3× Platinum+Gold
Can I Hug You, Lover?	Released: June 8, 1999; Label: Forward Music; Formats: CD, cassette	1	5	—	Asia: 8,000,000; TWN: 1,180,000	
Regardless	Released: December 5, 2000; Label: Forward Music; Formats: CD, cassette	—	—	8	TWN: 360,000	
Journey	Released: September 7, 2001; Label: Forward Music; Formats: CD, cassette	—	—	—	TWN: 100,000	
Truth	Released: October 29, 2001; Label: Warner Music Taiwan; Formats: CD, cassette	—	—	—	Asia: 1,600,000; TWN: 200,000	
Fever	Released: August 30, 2002; Label: Warner Music Taiwan; Formats: CD, cassette	—	—	—	TWN: 150,000	
Brave	Released: June 27, 2003; Label: Warner Music Taiwan; Formats: CD, cassette	—	—	—	TWN: 170,000	
Maybe Tomorrow	Released: September 21, 2004; Label: Warner Music Taiwan; Formats: CD, digital download	—	—	—	TWN: 80,000	
I Want Happiness?	Released: February 17, 2006; Label: Warner Music Taiwan; Formats: CD, digital download	1	—	—	Asia: 2,000,000; TWN: 160,000	
Star	Released: August 3, 2007; Label: EMI Records Taiwan; Formats: CD, digital download	1	—	—	TWN: 130,000	
Amit	Released: June 26, 2009; Label: Gold Typhoon; Formats: CD, digital download	1	—	—	Asia: 1,300,000; TWN: 120,000	
R U Watching?	Released: April 23, 2011; Label: Gold Typhoon; Formats: CD, digital download, streaming	1	—	—		
Faces of Paranoia	Released: July 2, 2014; Label: EMI, Universal; Formats: CD, digital download, streaming	2	6	—	TWN: 50,000	
Amit 2	Released: April 4, 2015; Label: EMI, Universal; Formats: CD, digital download, streaming	—	6	—	TWN: 60,000	
Story Thief	Released: December 12, 2017; Label: EMI, Universal; Formats: CD, digital download, streaming	—	2	—	SGP: 5,000 (Note: Sales figures are based on certification alone.)	RIAS: Gold
"—" denotes releases that did not chart, chart did not exist, or were not released in that region.

== Extended plays ==
Title	Album details	Peak chart positions	Sales
Title	Album details	TWN	Sales
Listen to You, Listen to Me	Released: October 29, 1997; Label: Forward Music; Formats: CD, cassette	—	
Feel	Released: April 20, 1999; Label: Forward Music; Formats: CD, cassette	1	TWN: 180,000
Taiwan, Touch Your Heart	Released: September 1, 2006; Formats: CD; Label: Tourism Administration Taiwan	—	
Happy and Free Flowing	Released: March 17, 2010; Formats: CD; Label: Gold Typhoon	—	

== Compilation albums ==
Title	Album details	Peak chart positions		Sales
Title	Album details	HK	MLY	Sales
A-Mei New Century Collection	Released: December 28, 1999; Label: Forward Music; Formats: CD, cassette	10	9	TWN: 410,000; Asia: 3,000,000
1996–2002 A-Mei's Best Selection	Released: October 11, 2002; Label: Forward Music; Formats: CD, cassette	—	—	
The Power of Love: 1996–2006 Greatest Hits	Released: February 9, 2006; Label: Warner Music; Formats: CD, digital download	—	—	
2 Her (with Stefanie Sun)	Released: January 21, 2009; Label: Warner Music; Formats: CD, digital download	—	—	
Acoustic Best	Released: December 13, 2011; Label: Forward Music; Formats: CD, digital download	—	—	
My Dearest A-Mei: The Music Within Me	Released: April 1, 2014; Label: Warner Music; Formats: CD, digital download	—	—	

== Singles ==
=== 1990s ===
List of singles released in the 1990s
Title	Year	Album
"You Don't Want Anything"	1996	Sisters
"Sisters" (姊妹)	1996	Sisters
"Release" (解脫)	1996	Sisters
"Cut Love" (剪愛)	1996	Sisters
"Bad Boy"	1997	Bad Boy
"Can't Cry"	1997	Bad Boy
"Whenever I Think About You"	1997	Bad Boy
"Listen to the Sea"	1997	Bad Boy
"Crying Sand" (哭砂)	1997	You Make Me Free Make Me Fly!
"Blue Sky" (藍天)	1998	Holding Hands
"Holding Hands" (牽手)	1998	Holding Hands
"Give Me Feelings"	1999	Feel
"Don't Rub Salt in the Wound" (別在傷口灑鹽)	1999	Can I Hug You, Lover?
"Can I Hug You" (我可以抱你嗎)	1999	Can I Hug You, Lover?
"Three Days and Three Nights" (三天三夜)	1999	Can I Hug You, Lover?
"I Want to Fly" (我要飛)	1999	A-Mei New Century Collection

=== 2000s ===
List of singles released in the 2000s
Title	Year	Album
"One Night Stand" (一夜情)	2000	Regardless
"Before It's Too Late" (趁早)	2000	Regardless
"Remember" (記得)	2001	Truth
"Truth" (真實)	2001	Truth
"Hate That I Love You" (我恨我愛你)	2001	Truth
"Understanding" (知道)	2002	Fever
"Creulty" (狠角色)	2002	Fever
"Brave" (勇敢)	2003	Brave
"Why I Love You So Much" (我為什麼那麼愛你)	2003	Brave
"Fake It" (假惺惺)	2003	Brave
"Fire" (火)	2004	Maybe Tomorrow
"Are You Well" (你好不好)	2004	Maybe Tomorrow
"Maybe Tomorrow" (也許明天)	2004	Maybe Tomorrow
"Hostage" (人質)	2006	I Want Happiness?
"I Want Happiness" (我要快樂)	2006	I Want Happiness?
"Have You Heard Lately?" (如果你也聽說)	2007	Star
"A Moment" (一眼瞬間) (with Jam Hsiao)	2007	Star
"Victoria's Secret" (維多莉亞的祕密)	2007	Star
"You Do Love Me" (你是愛我的)	2007	Star
"Disappear" (掉了)	2009	Amit
"Bold For My Love" (好膽你就來)	2009	Amit
"Rainbow" (彩虹)	2009	Amit

=== 2010s ===
List of singles released in the 2010s
Title	Year	Peak chart positions			Album
Title	Year	CHN Air.	CHN TME	SGP Reg.	Album
"My Dearest" (我最親愛的)	2011	—	—	—	R U Watching?
"As Long As I Can Cry" (還有眼淚就好)	2011	—	—	—	R U Watching?
"March" (三月)	2014	—	—	—	Faces of Paranoia
"Do You Still Want to Love Me" (這樣你還要愛我嗎)	2014	—	—	—	Faces of Paranoia
"Jump In" (跳進來)	2014	—	—	—	Faces of Paranoia
"Matriarchy" (母系社會)	2015	—	—	—	Amit 2
"A Bloody Love Story" (血腥愛情故事)	2015	—	—	—	Amit 2
"Shouldn't Be" (不該) (with Jay Chou)	2016	2	—	19	Jay Chou's Bedtime Stories
"We Are One" (with various artists)	2017	—	—	—	Non-album single
"Story Thief" (偷故事的人)	2017	5	—	—	Story Thief
"Full Name" (連名帶姓)	2017	2	—	16	Story Thief
"Left Behind" (身後)	2017	1	—	30	Story Thief
"Catfight" (傲嬌) (featuring Eve Ai and Lala Hsu)	2018	2	—	—	Story Thief
"Double Shadow" (双影) (with Sandy Lam)	2018	—	62	—	Non-album single
"—" denotes releases that did not chart, chart did not exist, or was not released in that region.

=== 2020s ===
List of singles released in the 2020s
Title	Year	Peak chart positions		Album
Title	Year	CHN TME	TWN	Album
"Huan Huan" (緩緩)	2020	—	—	Non-album single
"Equivalence Relation" (对等关系) (with Li Ronghao)	2021	27	18	Free Soul
"Tritesse" (離別總是那麼突然)	2023	—	—	Non-album singles
"—" denotes releases that did not chart, or was not released in that region.

== Promotional singles ==
List of promotional singles
Title	Year	Album
"Who Loves Me" (誰愛我)	2007	Star
"Dreams You Can Hear" (聽得見的夢想)	2009	Amit
"Open Happiness" (快樂暢開)	2010	Non-album single
"Thirsty" (渴了)	2011	R U Watching?
"Intoxicated" (High 咖)	2011	R U Watching?
"Rift" (裂痕)	2012	Non-album singles
"Ling Hun Jin Tou" (靈魂盡頭)	2015	Non-album singles
"Better Dayz" (M116 featuring A-Mei)	2019	Non-album singles
