= A-Mei =

Taiwanese singer and record producer (born 1972)

- Kulilay Amit
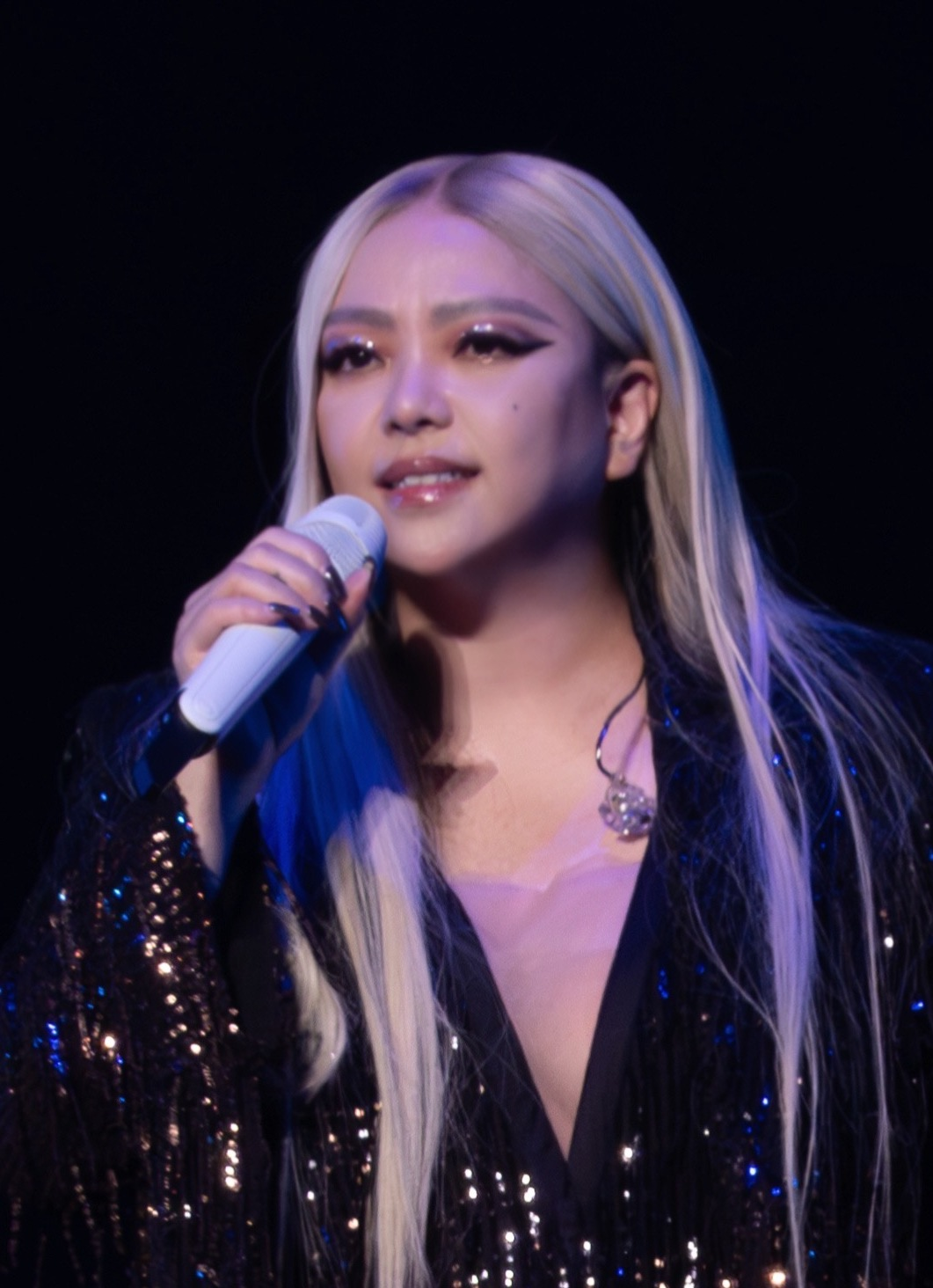
- A-Mei in 2024
- Born: Kulilay Amit; 9 August 1972 (age 54); Beinan, Taitung, Taiwan
- Other names: Chang Hui-mei; A-Mei Chang
- Education: National Taitung Junior College
- Occupations: Singer; record producer
- Years active: 1996–present
- Agent: Mei Entertainment
- Works: Discography
- Partner: Sam Yao (2011–present)
- Family: Saya Chang (sister)
- Musical career
- Genres: Mandopop; R&B; rock
- Instrument: Vocals
- Labels: Forward Music; Warner; EMI; Gold Typhoon; Universal

Chinese name
- Traditional Chinese: 張惠妹
- Simplified Chinese: 张惠妹
Transcriptions
Standard Mandarin
- Hanyu Pinyin: Zhāng Huìmèi
- Wade–Giles: Chang Hui-mei

A-Mei
- Chinese: 阿妹
Transcriptions
Standard Mandarin
- Hanyu Pinyin: Āmèi
- Wade–Giles: A1-mei4
- Website: starmei.com

Kulilay Amit (Note: In this Puyuma name, the house name is Kulilay. In accordance with Puyuma custom, this person should be referred to by the given name, Amit.) (Chinese: 張惠妹; pinyin: Zhāng Huìmèi; born 9 August 1972), better known by her stage name A-Mei, is a Taiwanese singer and record producer of Puyuma descent. Born in eastern Taiwan, she made her debut in 1996. A leading figure of the Mandopop music scene since the mid-1990s, A-Mei is regarded for breaking ground for Taiwanese indigenous peoples and being a voice for LGBT rights and gender equality. She has been given the moniker "Queen of Mandopop" and the "Pride of Taiwan." Her career longevity, resilience, artistry, and versatility have established her as a pop culture icon in the Sinophone world.

Born and raised in Beinan, Taitung, Taiwan, A-Mei moved to Taipei at age 20 in 1992. In 1996, she released her debut studio album, Sisters, which saw major commercial success and sold over a million copies in Taiwan. Her sophomore record, Bad Boy (1997), found even greater success, eventually becoming the country's best-selling album overall. Her follow up releases—Holding Hands (1998), Can I Hug You, Lover? (1999) and Regardless (2000)—received critical and commercial acclaim, with the first two albums also selling well over a million copies. A cross-strait relations controversy caused her to experience a decline in sales in 2004; she would later experience a resurgence in 2006 with her album I Want Happiness?.

Her albums Truth (2001), Amit (2009), and Faces of Paranoia (2014) each won her a Golden Melody Award for Best Mandarin Female Singer, making her one of the singers who won the category the most times. Having sold over 50 million records, A-Mei is the best-selling female artist in Taiwanese music history. In 2002, Time named her one of the 20 most influential people in Asia. In 2017, she was included in the "Charity Heroes List" by the Asian edition of Forbes. She has embarked on eight concert tours since her debut, with the Utopia World Tour (2015–2017) drawing over 2.5 million people.

== Life and career ==
=== 1972–1995: Early years and musical beginnings ===
A-Mei was born on 9 August 1972 in the Tamalakaw tribe (belonging to the Puyuma) in Beinan, Taitung, Taiwan. Her Puyuma-language name is Kulilay Amit, alternatively transliterated Gulilai Amit. She was the seventh child in a family of nine children. During her childhood A-Mei's family was impoverished, making it increasingly difficult to raise so many offspring. To support the family, the father originally wanted to give A-Mei and her younger sister Saya Chang to relatives for adoption. It was A-Mei's mother who took them to hide deep in the mountains to escape the fate of being adopted. Despite avoiding the fate of being separated from her family, A-Mei's upbringing was still quite difficult due to always being short on money. Although A-Mei couldn't receive formal training in music and stage performances, she showed her love for stage singing performances since she was a child. Like most Native Taiwanese people, she was exposed to tribal music very early on. Her mother used to record herself singing, then play it back on tape for her daughters to hear. A-Mei had always been fascinated by music, saying that she was addicted to the radio and would rush to watch the late night music programs that introduced her to English songs when she was a child. Oftentimes she summoned the children in the village and persuaded everyone to use flashlights to create "stage lighting effects" for her. In addition to her talent in music, A-Mei was also very good at sports. In elementary school, under the careful guidance of coach Shi Shunxiong, she earned a second-degree black belt and once represented her school in a taekwondo competition.

In 1992 A-Mei left her hometown of Taitung for the first time to work in a restaurant and sell clothes at a roadside stand in Taipei. She first connected to the entertainment business by joining the televised "Five Lights Singing Contest" on TTV Main Channel in 1992 after encouragement from her father. She made it all the way through to the finals but lost in the final round. She was disappointed and was almost ready to give up interest in music competitions. A-Mei's father then told her, "You definitely can sing, and you perform songs beautifully. Why don't you enter the competition again to show that you have a talent for music?" So, encouraged by the kind words from her father, she attended the singing contest again in 1993. Her performances enchanted the judges and she was crowned champion the following year. Unfortunately her father didn't live to see her victory due to him succumbing to his illness, leaving A-Mei devastated. Years later in 2009 when she released an album for the first time under her real name Amit, she sung the song "Disappear (掉了)" which expresses how dearly she misses him. After winning the Taiwan TV Five Lights Awards program, he was invited by Japan Asia Airways to go to Japan to perform at the "World Music Tour" in Tokyo.

After her father's death, A-Mei struggled to recall her passion for music until 1995 when she began to sing in local pubs with a rock band called "Relax" which was formed by her musician cousin. Her pub performance impressed Taiwanese music producer Chang Yu-sheng and Chang Hsiao-yen, the head of Taiwanese record label Forward Music at the time; she signed a recording deal with Forward Music in March 1996.

=== 1996–1997: Career beginnings, Sisters, and Bad Boy ===
After she signed a recording deal with Forward Music she made an appearance on Chang Yu-sheng's album, Red Passion, which was released on 12 July 1996, where they sang a duet titled "The One Who Loved Me Most, Hurt Me The Most (最愛的人傷我最深)." In November 1996, when A-Mei was invited to sing "I'm a Dreamer on Air (空中的夢想家)," the theme song for Taiwan's UFO Radio station, she again drew attention from the public. On 13 December 1996, A-Mei released her debut album Sisters, which she made under the tutelage of Chang. Originally, the head honchos at Forward Music worried that A-Mei's aboriginal heritage would have a negative impact on the album's sales due to discrimination against aboriginal people still being widespread at the time. In spite of this, A-Mei still emphasized to the media that she was from an aboriginal background and was the very first Taiwanese mainstream pop star to proudly flaunt her aboriginal identity. On the contrary, the album Sisters became a runaway success. The album topped the Taiwan IFPI chart for nine consecutive weeks and sold a total of 1.21 million copies in Taiwan and four million in Asia. The sales result for Sisters surprised Forward Music, since they had no expectations of it being so well-received, who even forgot to sign her up for the 8th Golden Melody Awards (the Sinophone equivalent to the Grammy Awards). The songs on Sisters such as "You Don't Want Anything (原來你什麼都不要)," "Released (解脫)," "Cut Love (剪愛)" and the titular track enjoyed hefty radio airplay throughout the Sinophone world. On the album's titular track, Chang invited A-Mei's mother, sisters and other relatives to participate in the chorus singing and added Puyuma musical elements to make the song more culturally enriching. The outstanding sales of Sisters helped it become the fourth best-selling album in Taiwan overall. It won the top ten albums of the Chinese Musicians Exchange Association in 1997, and eventually was placed at No. 10 in the selection of the "200 Best Taiwanese Popular Music Albums."

On 17 May 1997, Billboard Magazine declared A-Mei Asia's most popular singer. On 7 June 1997, she released her second studio album titled Bad Boy. For this record Chang was still highly involved in the songwriting and production department. Bad Boy became A-Mei's second consecutive album to top the Taiwan IFPI chart for nine weeks, and sold 1.38 million copies, making it the most sold album in Taiwanese music history. Additionally it sold an excess of six million copies throughout Asia, making A-Mei one of the most powerful and sought-after celebrities in the continent. The album Bad Boy spawned numerous hit singles such as the title track, "Can't Cry (哭不出來)," "Whenever I Think About You (一想到你呀)," "Dancing Alone (一個人跳舞)" and "Listen to the Sea (聽海)." They all have now been regarded as modern-day classics and are still receiving heavy rotation and being sung by contestants on televised major music competitions to this day. A-Mei performed songs from the album on her A-Mei Live In Concert 1998 concert tour the following year. Bad Boy earned her two Golden Melody Award nominations for Album of the Year and Best Mandarin Female Singer. However, tragedy struck five months after the album's release; her manager Chang died on 12 November 1997, at age 31, after falling into a coma for 24 days due to a car crash that occurred on 20 October 1997. During Chang's stay in the hospital, A-Mei visited him many times. At that time, to pay tribute to Chang who was dying, she released the CD single "Listen to You, Listen to Me (聽你聽我)." On 29 December 1997, she released the innovative album You Make Me Free Make Me Fly!, which featured the songs that were to be performed on her upcoming tour. The album was another hit, shipping 800,000 units in Taiwan and four million throughout Asia.

=== 1998–1999: Holding Hands, Can I Hug You, Lover? and A-Mei New Century Collection ===
A-Mei embarked on her first solo concert tour which was in Taiwan, Hong Kong and Singapore, in January 1998. On 10 January 1998, A-Mei held her first large-scale ticketed concert titled A-Mei Live in Concert 1998, breaking the record for the shortest time a large-scale concert has been held by a Taiwanese singer since their debut (there was only a year and 28 days between the release date of the first album and the date of the concert). It also became the fastest-selling concert in Taiwan in the past decade and had a very fanatic audience, with both the Taipei and Kaohsiung shows being full houses. The two shows at the Singapore Indoor Stadium also set a number of records, including the record for the fastest sold-out concert: the first show was sold out within ten hours while the second was sold out within eight hours.

Due to her immense fame, A-Mei was formally invited by the Japanese public broadcaster NHK to perform as a representative of Taiwan in the annual ceremony "Asia Live Dream" in February 1998. 12 October 1998, saw the release of her fourth studio album, Holding Hands. In the album, A-Mei sang the posthumous works "Are You Ready" and "Her Consciousness (後知後覺)" of her mentor Chang Yu-sheng and for the first time collaborated with Taiwanese singer-songwriter David Tao, who had just risen in the music scene. He wrote and composed the songs "Don't Lie To Me (不要騙我)" and "High High High." Continuing her winning streak of success, the album earned a RIT record certification by selling over 790,000 copies in the span of one month. Cumulative sales reached 1.1 million copies in Taiwan and four million in Asia. Holding Hands earned her a Golden Melody Award nomination for Best Mandarin Female Singer. Also in 1998, she won the Best Theme Song award at the Star Awards 1998 ceremony for her performance of the song "I Do Not Mind (我無所謂)," which served as the opening theme song to the TV series Rising Expectations. On December 31, a New Year's Eve concert titled "Sisters Acting, Singing and Partying Through 1999" was held at Nangang in Taipei.

In January 1999, A-Mei endorsed Sprite in Sinophone territories, singing the song "Give Me Feelings (給我感覺)" in the commercials. The commercial was filmed in Shanghai, which resulted in serious traffic jams around the shooting site. At this point she had won more than 30 awards in just two and a half years since her debut, and her total album sales exceeded ten million. In the past two years, she had been awarded consecutively. In the preceding year alone MTV selected her record as the best Mandarin album. A-Mei won the "Gold Award for Female Singer in the Music World" in the 1998 Ultimate Song Chart Awards Ceremony held by Commercial Radio Hong Kong and the "Asia Pacific Music Award" in the 1998 Top Ten Golden Songs Awards Ceremony. Winning "District's Most Popular Hong Kong Female Singer," she had become the only non-Hong Kong native and non-Hong Kong debut singer to win those two awards. On 20 April 1999, her EP entitled Feel was released and sold 180,000 copies, making it the best-selling mini-album in Taiwan's music history. On 8 June 1999, A-Mei released her fifth album Can I Hug You, Lover?. Carrying the momentum of the upcoming Mei Li 99 concert, the album sold more than 500,000 copies within its first week of availability in Taiwan, and was No. 1 on the IFPI chart for an eleven consecutive weeks, breaking the nine week championship record of her very own album Bad Boy. It sold a total of 1.18 million copies in Taiwan, and finally more than eight million copies in Asia, breaking the Asian sales record of six million copies of the highest-selling album in Taiwan, Bad Boy, to become A-Mei's highest-selling album in Asia to date. The album also earned her a Golden Melody Award nomination for Best Mandarin Female Singer.

In the following months A-Mei held her second Asia concert Tour, Mei Li 99, visiting various cities in Taiwan and other Asian cities, including Hong Kong, Singapore, Beijing and Shanghai. She became the first Taiwanese singer to perform at the Shanghai Stadium, with the seats at the venue filled to the brim; it is notable that there were nearly 80,000 attendees attending the show, making it the most successful concert in that city's history. On 6 August 1999, she became the first artist to perform a concert at Beijing's Workers' Stadium. With more than 60,000 tickets sold, she broke the record for the highest number of spectators for a single performance in the city. More than 50,000 people poured into the two concerts at Hong Kong's now defunct Kai Tak Airport, making her the first and last Taiwanese singer to hold two ticketed concerts there. At the Taipei Municipal Stadium, she became the only female singer to "open the entire venue" to a crowd of nearly 50,000 people, thus being regarded as a major benchmark in Taiwan's concert history. A-Mei is also the first to perform in Taitung County by holding a large-scale ticketed concert at the Taitung County Stadium that attracted tens of thousands of people. In Singapore, she also became the first act to perform at the Singapore National Stadium; all the 35,000 tickets at that concert sold out completely. The tour held 14-concerts and attracted about 500,000 spectators, all told.

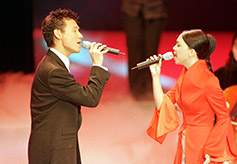
A-Mei and Jacky Cheung singing together at the 36th Golden Horse Awards on 12 December 1999

By this point Eastern and Western papers had dubbed her popularity the "A-Mei syndrome." In the same year, A-Mei became the first Taiwanese artist to appear on the cover of Asia Weekly. Many people at the time even believed that she had the ability to inherit Teresa Teng's popularity in mainland China. In September 1999, she sang "Love, Never Disappears (愛, 永遠不會消失)," a song composed by Wang Leehom, to honor the victims of the 921 earthquake (also known as Chi-Chi earthquake) and donated her concert revenue from that night in Singapore to charity. In December 1999, she performed with Jacky Cheung at the 36th Golden Horse Awards. A-Mei's so-called "sister power" became unstoppable at that point, and she was listed among the "Top Ten Chinese Voice Figures" in 1999 by Huasheng Magazine. On 28 December 1999, A-Mei released the greatest hits album A-Mei New Century Collection. It also became a hot seller, shipping 410,000 copies in Taiwan and 3 million copies in Asia. It is Taiwan's best-selling album by a female artist in the 21st century. On 31 December 1999, she participated in two New Year's Eve concerts in Taipei City.

=== 2000: China Ban and Regardless ===
In January 2000, A-Mei performed Sprite's new Chinese commercial song, "I Want to Fly (我要飛)." During that same month, the latest issue of the now defunct American magazine Details produced the Millennium "International Ecstasy List." Taiwan's Shu Qi and A-Mei were both on the list, with Details going as far as calling her China's Madonna. On February 4, 2000, she was invited to CCTV Spring Festival Gala 2000, where she sung the song "Give Me Feelings (给我感觉)," which is a treatment that many famous singers have never had the chance to enjoy. After the Spring Festival Gala A-Mei's popularity continued to skyrocket in mainland China. On 28 February 2000, she became the first Taiwanese artist to be interviewed by the American cable television network CNN. CNN called A-Mei the "Asian Music Ambassador" and praised her for taking the mainland by storm with her singing at a time when cross-strait relations were tense and everchanging. In March 2000, she held two shows in Hong Kong with the Hong Kong Philharmonic Orchestra; singing a wide variety of songs that included Chinese, English, Cantonese and Taiwanese Hokkien classics at the Hong Kong Coliseum. A month later on 14 April 2000, she released the audio of the performances on a live album titled Time to Say Goodbye, A-Mei Hong Kong Live.

On 20 May 2000 she sang the National Anthem of the Republic of China at the presidential inauguration ceremony of Chen Shui-bian, angering the government of the People's Republic of China which subsequently interfered her with visiting mainland China until July 2001. Under pressure from Beijing, Sprite also buckled and cut its contract with A-Mei by removing her as its endorser, meanwhile contemporary hit radio stations in China temporarily ceased broadcasting her music. On 5 December 2000, she released her seventh studio album titled Regardless, which turned out to ultimately be A-Mei's last original studio record to be released under Forward Music. The album was another hit for her by selling over 360,000 copies in Taiwan and over a million copies across Asia. Regardless is listed as one of the best-selling albums in Taiwan in the 21st century. The album earned her a Golden Melody Award nomination for Best Mandarin Female Singer at the 12th Golden Melody Awards. To promote the album she held a concert at Nangang District, Taipei on the day of its premiere. A-Mei also held press conferences in Taiwan, Hong Kong, Singapore, and Malaysia. On 31 December 2000, she participated in a New Year's Eve concert in Taipei.

=== 2001–2003: Switch to Warner Music, Truth, Fever and Brave ===
A-Mei graced the cover of Newsweek in January 2001, with the headline "Pop & Politics." This made her the only Taiwanese singer to pose on the magazine's cover to date. After finding a home in June 2001 with Warner Music Taiwan, A-Mei sang the Mandarin theme song for the movie Pearl Harbor, which was a cover of Faith Hill's "There You'll Be." In August, Beijing hosted the 2001 Summer Universiade; when she was invited to be a guest at the opening ceremony and sang the two songs "Sisters (姊妹)" and "Holding Hands (牵手)" at the finale, the entire venue of 80,000 people screamed and cheered. On 7 September 2001, Forward Music released the compilation album, Journey, which included all unreleased songs A-Mei recorded when she was signed under Forward Music. The album sold over 100,000 copies in Taiwan and a million copies across Asia. 29 October 2001, saw the release of her first album under Warner, which was simply titled Truth. Commercially, the album was a success, selling over 200,000 copies in Taiwan and 1.6 million copies across Asia. Hit songs like the title track, "Remember (記得)" and "Hate That I Love You (我恨我愛你)" became popular songs in major televised singing talent shows years down the line. On 9 November 2001, in Taipei City, the "Real New Song Concert" was held at the Chiang Kai-shek Memorial Hall where A-Mei held a free large-scale concert to promote the album. More than 30,000 fans were packed at the venue, allowing fans who had not seen each other for a long time to share her musical works over the past year. In December 2001, A-Mei held seven concerts in the United States and Canada. The Toronto show is also the most successful solo concert held by a Taiwanese singer there in recent years. At the last performance of the tour in Silicon Valley, San Francisco, a small autograph session for a hundred fans was held. During the event the local mayor of Cupertino presented the "Outstanding Artist Award from Cross-Strait and Three Places." On 31 December 2001, she participated in a New Year's Eve concert in Taipei City.

In 2002 A-Mei won the Best Mandarin Female Singer award for the very first time with the album Truth at the 13th Golden Melody Awards; it was a deserving win after four years of consecutive nominations in the same category since her second album Bad Boy. Also a performing guest, she put on a showcase titled, "Best of Asia" that evening. A-Mei was named as one of the 25 Asian Heroes featured in the special issue of Time Magazine in 2002. On 30 August 2002, she released her tenth studio album Fever. The first batch of 120,000 copies was sold out within five days of its release, and the demand for goods continued to soar past the 150,000 mark. The album sold 180,000 copies in Taiwan and over two million copies throughout Asia, making it yet another success. Fever earned her two Golden Melody Award nominations for Album of the Year and Best Mandarin Female Singer. On 3 August 2002, she embarked on her third concert tour, A-Class Entertainment World Tour, which visited Taiwan, mainland China, Hong Kong, Singapore, Malaysia, Australia and United States. In the same year, she won the MTV Asia Award for Favorite Artist Taiwan. A-Mei appeared on the cover of Asia Weekly for the second time at the end of the year. The magazine titled "A-Mei Sings the Future of Cross-Strait, Singing Through the Political Wall of the Taiwan Strait," using her singing to penetrate the ideologies of both sides of the Taiwan Strait, and sung out new hope for the future of the Taiwan Strait. In Star News' poll of young Taiwanese people's favorite female idols, according to the newspaper's questionnaire survey results, A-Mei won the title of teenagers' favorite female idol with 5.8%. Beating out other popular figures like Stefanie Sun, Coco Lee and Elva Hsiao.

Due to the SARS epidemic in 2003 A-Mei enthusiastically participated in the charity record co-sponsored by Wang Leehom, David Tao and Azio TV. The song was titled "Hand in Hand" and featured other prolific musicians like Jay Chou, Elva Hsiao, Jolin Tsai, S.H.E and Jody Chiang. In June 2003, A-Mei sponsored the Korean PC game "A3," being paid tens of millions for the endorsement. On the 27th of the same month, the album Brave was released. She also had her first starring role in a film serving as the heroine of the movie Brave, and sang the theme song "Brave" for the movie of the same name. The song "Brave" became the champion song in the gay love song vote that year. Brave is the only A-Mei album to date to not receive a nomination for a Golden Melody, but it still achieved great sales of 170,000 copies in Taiwan and 1.6 million in Asia. The commercial success of Brave convinced the record company to spend tens of millions holding three "It's Me Who's Missing You" summer concerts in Taitung's Seaside Park, Sizihwan and Fulong Beach. In the second half of 2003 the A-Class Entertainment World Tour was held in Malaysia, Shantou, Xiamen, Fuzhou, Connecticut, Las Vegas and other places. In November 2003, she participated in the "City of Joy – Chang Yu-Sheng, All Star Tribute Concert" to commemorate her mentor the late Chang Yu-sheng.

=== 2004–2005: Maybe Tomorrow, decline in sales and popularity, and studying abroad at Boston ===
At the MTV Asia Awards 2004 A-Mei won the award for Favorite Artist Taiwan for the second time on Valentine's Day 2004. At the end of April 2004, A-Mei won a World Peace Music Award in recognition of her emphasis on indigenous culture and her extraordinary influence in the Sinophone world, making her the first Taiwanese singer to win this award. On 12 June 2004, A-Mei became the focus of international controversy when she was forced to abruptly cancel a concert in Hangzhou after students from Zhejiang University branded her a "supporter of Taiwanese independence." Several hundred students invaded a press conference at which she had been scheduled to appear, chanting slogans and holding banners decrying the "green performer." Concerned for A-Mei's safety, the organizers canceled her appearance. Back home in Taiwan, A-Mei was under fire from individuals who championed Taiwanese pride. China's state-run CCTV had quoted her as saying, apparently about her decision to sing her national anthem at President Chen's inauguration in Taiwan: "I had to suffer the consequences of a decision that was not made by me ... I should have been more discreet in my behavior, which impacts so many people." The former Vice President Annette Lu even questioned the patriotism of the popster. Meanwhile, Premier Yu Shyi-kun offered a clarification of his own previous remarks about the singer. He explained that his remarks were intended to criticize China, and that he had not intended to criticize the singer herself, arguing that the local media had misquoted him. While politics and showbiz are not exactly bedfellows in Asia, A-Mei clarified that she has no intention of engaging in anything irrelevant to her profession. In response to the uproar, A-Mei called on the media to cease its sensational reporting and to end their distortion of her words. She reinforced her position by stating, "What we really need is more peace and love in our country." Political issues aside, A-Mei gave a benefit concert in Taipei on 22 July 2004, for the victims of Typhoon Mindulle, which caused widespread destruction that summer, especially in the aboriginal areas in the country. The concert was free, but each audience member was asked to make a donation of US$30. On 31 July 2004, A-Mei set foot in Beijing once again and held a successful concert, with an estimated 10,000-strong audience. As reported by the media, A-Mei confessed that she had never felt such great pressure at a concert before, when fans begged her not to be disturbed by the raucous protesters.

Undeterred by negativity, A-Mei proceeded to work on her new album Maybe Tomorrow, which was released on 21 September 2004. A-Mei composed the two songs "Love Is The Only Way (愛是唯一)" and "Crucial Moment (關鍵時刻)" on the album. The album earned her a Golden Melody Award nomination for Best Mandarin Female Singer at the 16th Golden Melody Awards. The music video of the song, "Love Is The Only Way" was nominated for Best Music Video of the Year. In October, it was featured in American LGBT magazine The Advocate. While Maybe Tomorrow performed well at first, it quickly fell off the charts due to its sound, which was different from the standard Mandarin pop sound at that time. A-Mei also stirred up controversy with the song "Love Is The Only Way," which had a music video that depicted a same-sex wedding with the two grooms sharing a kiss. The video ended up being banned from broadcasting in the mainland. As a whole the album sold about 80,000 units in Taiwan, which is considerably lower than her previous releases. Maybe Tomorrow became A-Mei's lowest-selling studio album to that point and was generally viewed as an abject commercial failure. The many personal and professional setbacks over the past year made A-Mei contemplate on whether her current situation was suitable for continuing her music career; so at the end of 2004 she came up with the idea of temporarily leaving the music scene to go study abroad in Boston, Massachusetts. In the same year, A-Mei became the only Chinese singer to be featured on the cover of the UK's NME, with her album Maybe Tomorrow trumping Oasis' Don't Believe the Truth, Coldplay's X&Y, and the rest of the powerhouses to be crowned the 'Best British Album of the New Century', and to be featured on the cover.

In January 2005 she went to Hong Kong to participate in a charity show that was meant to raise funds for the victims of the 2004 Indian Ocean earthquake and tsunami. In February 2005, she headed to Boston for a three-month language study through Boston University's Center for English Language & Orientation Programs. The trip to Boston was intended as a journey of self-discovery rather than a mere getaway. After returning to Taiwan she first participated in Ni Min-jan's public memorial and sang to comfort his family. Meanwhile, a series produced by the Discovery Channel in collaboration with Taiwan's Government Information Office called "Portraits Taiwan (台灣人物誌)" that spotlighted Taiwanese icons in different fields, selected A-Mei as the representative of the "Mass Culture and Entertainment" category. A-Mei took up the task as the Taiwanese World Vision International ambassador and headed to southern Sudan with the charitable organization in June/July 2005. On 2 September 2005, she went to Shanghai to participate in Jackie Chan's racing fundraiser. On 1 October 2005, A-Mei participated in a national women's charity endorsement, which also made her the first singer to sing at the Taipei Arena. In November of the same year, A-Mei performed "Singing Sister Shadow" at the 42nd Golden Horse Awards. Her live singing skills and stage charm were unanimously praised by the public, and the performance was regarded as her first big step to return to the pinnacle of the music scene after a brief slump.

=== 2006–2007: Resurgence of sales, revived popularity, I Want Happiness? and Star ===
On 17 February 2006 she released her thirteenth studio album, I Want Happiness?. Producer Eric Chen used A-Mei's most pure and direct singing as the main theme. On the first day of release nearly 100,000 copies of the album were pre-ordered. Popular singles from the album such as the title track and "Hostage (人質)" became popular songs in KTV and major televised singing competitions. Widely considered as her comeback album, I Want Happiness? was a commercial success by selling 160,000 copies in Taiwan, and the record is credited for saving her career from its imminent doom. In the mainland Chinese market, it even won the first half of the year with total sales of 960,000 copies. The album sales champion eventually sold over two million copies in Asia and earned her a Golden Melody Award nomination for Best Female Mandarin Singer. On 27 May 2006, a ticketed concert was held in Las Vegas, with all of the 7,000 tickets sold out entirely. The organizers also specially arranged for A-Mei to take a helicopter to the press conference venue to enjoy diva-level treatment. In June 2006, A-Mei participated in the finale performance titled "Music ORZ" at the 17th Golden Melody Awards. In December 2006, she produced a musical, In Love with Carmen, which was performed twice at Taipei Arena. During the performances she invited the Singaporean singer A-do and the Taiwanese singer A-Lin (who had just debuted at the time) to join her on stage.

In April 2007, EMI Taiwan spent more than ten million to hold a pan-Asian press conference in Hong Kong that was meant to announce the signing of A-Mei to their company. During the event she signed a three-year and three album recording contract worth NT$150 million, making her the highest-paid female singer in the region at the time. On 3 August 2007, she released her fourteenth studio album, Star. The critically and commercially acclaimed effort earned her three Golden Melody Award nominations for Best Mandarin Album, Best Female Mandarin Singer, and Song of the Year for "A Moment (一眼瞬間)," which was a duet with Taiwanese singer Jam Hsiao. Star occupied the No. 1 spot on Taiwan's G-Music charts for four consecutive weeks and ended up selling over 130,000 copies in Taiwan and 1.7 million copies in Asia. To celebrate the sales of Star a concert was held at Tamsui Fisherman's Wharf on 9 September 2007. 30,000 attended that night, setting a record for the largest number of people attending a concert held by a singer at that venue. On 22 September 2007, she participated in the fourth Asia Song Festival in Seoul, South Korea, with her three-song performance receiving many praises. In the same month A-Mei became the very first Taiwanese singer to be interviewed by the news agency Reuters. In October 2007, she served as the "Rainbow Ambassador" for the fifth annual Taiwan Pride parade. She said that she was very happy for the support her gay fans have given her along the way and will always support gays who are in hiding along with the ones who are happy to come forward. She also generously embraced HIV carriers Yahui and Ladybug on stage and expressed her hope to participate in the Pride Parade every year. In November 2007, she embarked on her fourth solo concert tour called the Star World Tour which visited Taiwan, Mainland China, Hong Kong, Singapore, Malaysia, Japan, Canada and United States.

=== 2008–2010: Turandot and Amit ===
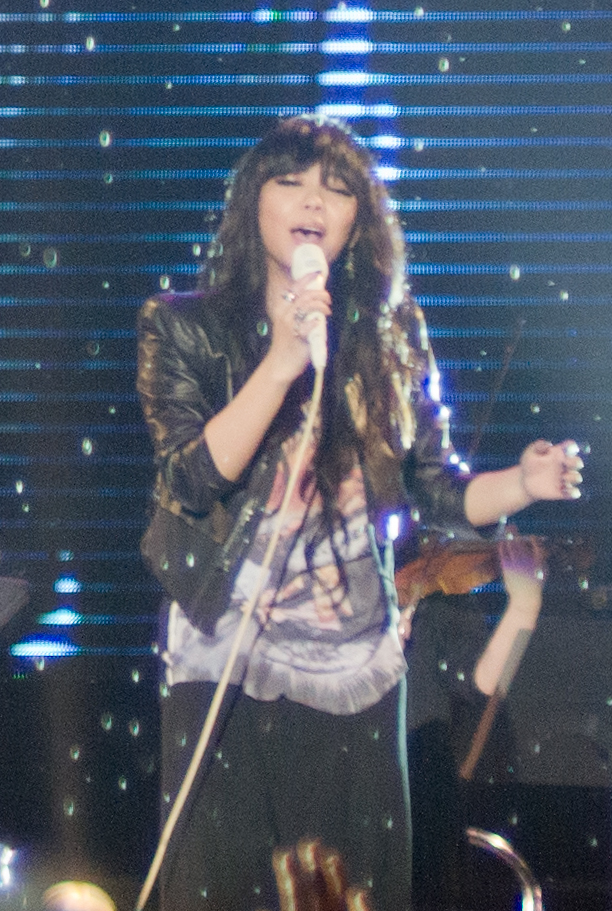
A-Mei performing in December 2010

In February 2008, A-Mei filmed the music video for the 2008 Olympics theme song "Forever Friends" in the Forbidden City. From March to May 2008, she embarked on an opera tour of the musical Turandot in Japan, which was produced by Joe Hisaishi and directed by Amon Miyamoto. A-Mei overcame the language barrier and performed in Tokyo with many Japanese actors. She performed 59 consecutive performances overall in major Japanese cities such as Osaka and Nagoya, with all of the performances being very well received. On 12 May 2008, the 2008 Sichuan earthquake occurred. She donated the NT$5 million revenue from 11 performances of Turandot between the 12th to the 22nd to the earthquake victims so that they could rebuild their homes. At the 19th Golden Melody Awards that year, not only was she nominated for five awards and invited to perform for her Star album, A-Mei brought her "Amit" performance style to the big stage for the first time with pop punk music.

At the end of March 2009, the Star World Tour ended at the Taipei Arena. The tour lasted a year and five months and held 20 performances in 13 cities, attracting an audience of 500,000 spectators. A-Mei became the first Chinese singer to perform five consecutive concerts with the same theme at the Taipei Arena. She released her fifteenth studio album, Amit, on 26 June 2009, which was her very first album to be released under her aboriginal birth name. This album showed a significant change in the genre of music A-Mei sung, as most of the songs incorporated hard rock music. The songs in the album extensively touch on serious topics such as personality conflicts, lost family ties, human sexuality, female consciousness, homosexuality, among others. The commercially successful album sold over 120,000 copies in Taiwan and topped the G-Music charts for three nonconsecutive weeks, while sales across Asia exceeded 1.3 million. On 5 September 2009, she became the spokesperson for the 2009 Summer Deaflympics held in Taipei and participated in the opening ceremony as a guest, singing the theme song "Dreams You Can Hear (聽得見的夢想)." In November 2009, she embarked on her fifth concert tour, Amit First Tour, which visited Taiwan, Mainland China, Hong Kong, Macau, Japan, Singapore, and Malaysia. In March 2010, she was paid nearly ten million yuan to become the spokesperson of Coca-Cola in Taiwan. At the 21st Golden Melody Awards, A-Mei became the most decorated artist that night with the album Amit winning a total of six trophies. The last time A-Mei had received a major Golden Melody Award was when she won the Golden Melody Award for Best Female Mandarin Singer in 2002 for her album Truth eight years prior.

=== 2011–2013: R U Watching Me? and AMeiZING World Tour ===
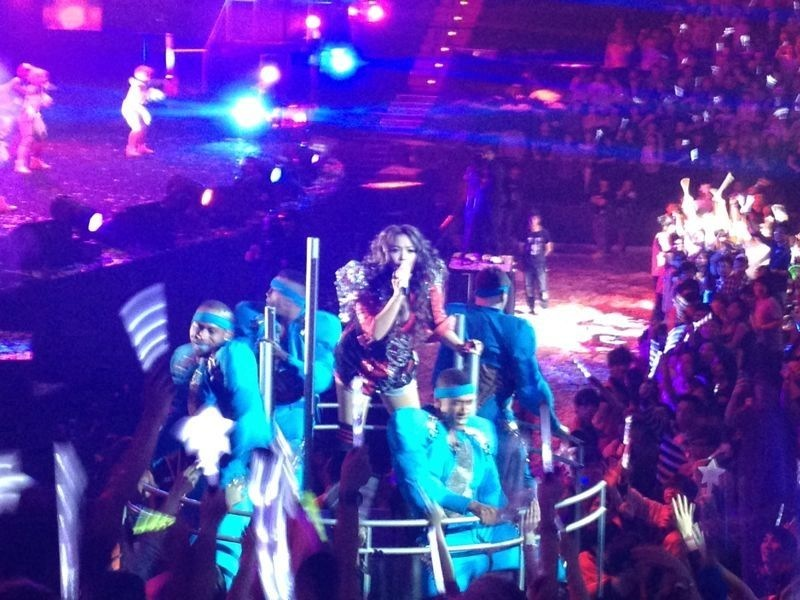
A-Mei performing during the AMeiZING World Tour Concert at Taipei Arena in 2012

In January 2011, The Biography Channel (now known as FYI), which mainly reports on the world's most influential and representative figures, produced a special episode about A-Mei, which was broadcast in 23 countries around the world with more than 67 million viewers. The exclusive interview focuses on A-Mei's story from when she went to study in the United States in 2005 when her career had circled the drain, to when she later produced a musical and became a sensation in the music industry as Amit. She is the first Taiwanese singer to accept this interview. In March 2011, she renewed her contract with Coca-Cola Company to become the spokesperson for their 125th anniversary; A-Mei was also allowed to personally design a limited edition commemorative bottle. On 23 April 2011, the album R U Watching Me?, which took three years to produce, was released. R U Watching Me? sold more than 65,000 copies in Taiwan, becoming the fifth highest-selling album in Taiwan that year. The album earned her a Golden Melody Award nomination for Best Mandarin Female Singer. In May 2011, CNN sat down and interviewed A-Mei for the second time. During the interview she talked about her singing career, image transformation, etc. in the "Asian Celebrity Chat Room" TalkAsia. In June 2011, A-Mei ranked first in a Forbes survey of "The 25 Most Famous Taiwanese in Mainland China," making her influence bigger than that of many well-known political and business figures. At the 22nd Golden Melody Awards ceremony, A-Mei sang the song medley "My Dearest Music Master." In the same month the revised album R U Watching Me Our Celebration Edition was released, and the "COCA COLA Happy 125 Years A-Mei Live" concert was held at Chiang Kai-shek Memorial Hall on the 25th with 30,000 fans in attendance, marking a rare event at that venue in recent years.

In September 2011 she embarked on her sixth concert tour called the AMeiZING World Tour to commemorate the 15th anniversary of her debut; the tour kicked off in Chengdu, China at the Chengdu Sports Centre and went on to play 59 shows in total in Taiwan, mainland China, Hong Kong, Macau, Singapore, Malaysia, Australia, United Kingdom and United States. During the tour's London stop on, she became the first Chinese-speaking female singer to hold a large-scale solo concert at The O2 Arena in England, setting a precedent for Taiwanese popstars in the European music market. In July 2013, A-Mei became one of the judges of Chinese talent show, The Voice of China (season 2), along with Wang Feng, Na Ying, and Harlem Yu. In December of the same year, A-Mei held a free outdoor concert to support the legalization of same-sex marriage at Huashan 1914 Creative Park. The concert had no sponsorships, so the production cost of more than three million was paid all by herself.

=== 2014–2019: EMI / Universal Music, Faces of Paranoia, Amit 2 and Story Thief ===
In January 2014 A-Mei was placed on the Asia Gay Equality Heroes list made by the well-known international gay magazine Element Magazine in Singapore. After Universal Music Group acquired EMI, it became one of Universal's record labels. In June 2014, A-Mei signed a recording deal with EMI Taiwan and was selected as the chief brand officer for the record label. The brand director of China also announced that Show Lo and Rainie Yang have joined the company. On 2 July 2014, she released her fourteenth studio album, Faces of Paranoia. The album earned Golden Melody Award shortlistings for Best Mandarin Female Singer and Song of the Year with the album's titular song; she ended up taking home the prize for Best Mandarin Female Singer. At the tail end of summer 2014, a concert was held at the Fulfillment Amphitheater in Taichung, with all of the 6,000 tickets selling out instantly. Therefore, the organizer specially opened the grassland area, attracting 30,000 people to attend. Not only was the venue full, but the lawn outside the venue was also chockablock with fans. In October of the same year, A-Mei served as the cover model of Singapore's Element Magazine where she was draped in a rainbow flag to support gay equality.

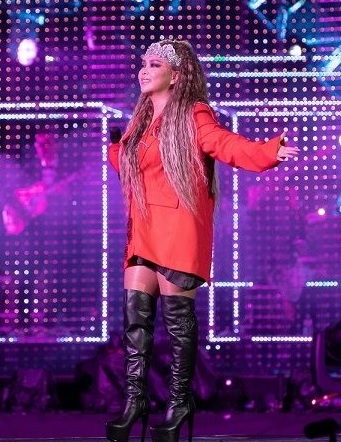
A-Mei at the Taipei New Year's Eve Party 2019

In April 2015 she embarked on her seventh concert tour, Utopia World Tour, which kicked off at the Taipei Arena with the 120,000 tickets being sold out in dozen minutes, setting a record for a solo artist's ticket sales in the Chinese music industry. All in all, the tour played a total of 55 shows in Taiwan, Mainland China, Hong Kong, Macau, Singapore, Malaysia, Japan, Thailand, New Zealand, Australia, Canada and the United States. On 4 April 2015, she released her fifteenth studio album, Amit 2. The album earned her five Golden Melody Award nominations for Best Mandarin Album, Best Vocal recording Album, Best Mandarin Female Singer, Best Album Producer and Song of the Year with the song "Matriarchy (母系社會)." In August 2015, she became one of the guest judges of the Chinese talent show The Voice of China (season 4). In October 2016, she appeared on the Chinese variety show Sound of My Dream. In December 2016, she embarked on the upgraded version of her seventh concert tour, Utopia 2.0 Carnival World Tour, as the celebration of the 20th anniversary of her singing career, which visited Taiwan, mainland China, Macau, Singapore, Malaysia, Spain, Italy, United Kingdom, Canada and the United States.

On 15 January 2017, 66,000 tickets for six concerts of Utopia 2.0 Carnival World Tour held at the Kaohsiung Arena sold out in 8 minutes. The organizer announced the addition of two shows and 22,000 tickets, which sold out in 45 seconds. The Kaohsiung Arena concert grossed 200 million yuan in box office revenue, attracted nearly 100,000 fans, and brought more than 1 billion yuan in tourism revenue to Kaohsiung. On the last day of her 20th anniversary of her debut (12 December), she released her nineteenth studio album, Story Thief. The album Story Thief cost 50 million in promotional expenses and returned to her signature sisterly love songs. It successfully achieved good sales, with the first batch of 30,000 copies being sold out. Not only did Story Thief win the top spot in major physical, digital, and radio charts, A-Mei also once again took the top spot in Taiwan's annual sales for a female vocalist.

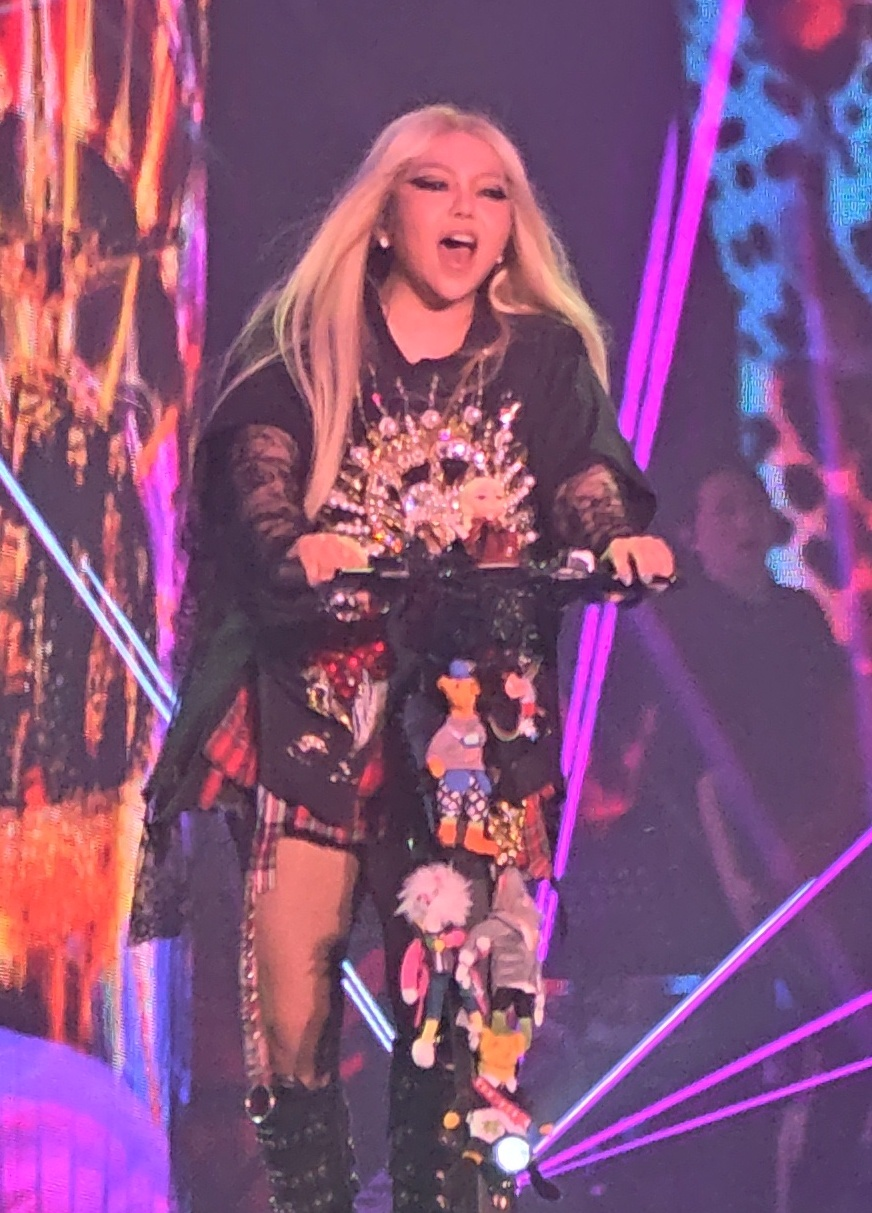
A-Mei performing in Guangzhou in May 2025

On 30 December 2017 the final show of the Utopia World Tour was completed in Shanghai, setting a record among Chinese female singers and Taiwanese singers of 104 concerts during one tour. On 16 May 2018, her album Story Thief earned six nominations at the 29th Golden Melody Awards and won Best Music Video for "Left Behind (身後)," which was directed by Lo Ging-zim. The music video for "Left Behind (身後)" also won a Red Dot Design Award at the Berlin Red Dot Design Award in the same year; along with a MAMA Award for Best MV Director. On 6 September 2018, A-Mei was invited to sing her latest single "If Only" with one of the world's leading tenors, Andrea Bocelli, at the Celebrity Fight Night charity gala in Italy in 3 languages: Italian, English and Chinese. The song was released digitally in mid-September and was included on Bocelli's Sì album, which was released on 26 October 2018. On 8 December 2018, she attended the 12th Migu Music Awards and won three major awards: "Best Album of the Year" for the album Story Thief, "Most Appealing Singer," and "Top 10 Songs of the Year" for the song "Full Name (連名帶姓)." Around this time Story Thief had recorded sales of 8.25 million between 2017 and 2018. On 31 December 2018, A-Mei was the finale guest before the countdown at Taipei City's New Year's Eve Festival. Her performance of fifteen classic songs in a row reached a rating high of 4.78, and her superb performance was applauded all over the internet. The album Story Thief took the top spot in Taiwan's annual sales for two consecutive years among female artists.

== Discography ==
- Sisters (1996)
- Bad Boy (1997)
- You Make Me Free Make Me Fly! (1997)
- Holding Hands (1998)
- Can I Hug You, Lover? (1999)
- Regardless (2000)
- Journey (2001)
- Truth (2001)
- Fever (2002)
- Brave (2003)
- Maybe Tomorrow (2004)
- I Want Happiness? (2006)
- Star (2007)
- Amit (2009)
- R U Watching? (2011)
- Faces of Paranoia (2014)
- Amit 2 (2015)
- Story Thief (2017)

== Concert tours ==
- Sister Power World Tour (1998)
- Mei Li 99 World Tour (1999)
- A-Class Entertainment World Tour (2002–2006)
- Star World Tour (2007–2009)
- Amit First World Tour (2009–2010)
- Ameizing World Tour (2011–2013)
- Utopia World Tour (2015–2017)
- ASMR World Tour (2022–2025)

== Collaborations ==
- "Shouldn't Be" (with Jay Chou) from Jay Chou's Bedtime Stories (2016)
- "Equivalence Relation" (with Li Ronghao) from Free Soul) (2022)

== Filmography ==
=== Television ===
- The Voice of China (season 4)

== See also ==
- List of best-selling albums in Taiwan
