= Regardless =

Regardless may refer to:

- "Regardless" (Jarryd James song), 2015
- "Regardless" (Raye and Rudimental song), 2020
- Regardless (album), by Taiwanese singer A-Mei, 2000
