= Brave (A-Mei album) =

Studio album by A-Mei
- Released: June 27, 2003
- Recorded: 2003
- Studios: Platinum Studio (Taipei); Premium Studio; Juice Shack Studio (Los Angeles); Martians Studio; Theater Studio (Beijing); Monster Studio; tman Studio
- Genre: Pop
- Length: 39:55
- Label: Warner Music
- Producers: Xu Guangyi; Jae Chong; Will Lin; Eric Chen; Martin Tang

A-Mei chronology
Fever (2002)	Brave (2003)	Maybe Tomorrow (2004)

Singles from Brave
- 1. "Brave" Released: June 18, 2003; 2. "Fake It" Released: June 27, 2003

Brave (Chinese: 勇敢; pinyin: Yǒnggǎn) is the eleventh studio album by Taiwanese singer A-Mei. It was released on June 27, 2003, by Warner Music Taiwan. The album was produced by Xu Guangyi, Jae Chong, Will Lin, Eric Chen and Martin Tang. Lyricists include Chen Jiawen, Xia Mu and others, and composers include Tanya Chua and others. Brave incorporates musical genres such as pop, R&B, hip hop, dance, jazz, reggae and ska.

Around the time of the album's release, A-Mei landed her first major acting role by starring as the heroine of the movie Brave directed by the advertising industry's well-known director Deng Yongxing; the album's title track served as the film's theme song.

Following its release, Brave received generally favorable reviews from music critics, many of whom complimented A-Mei for experimenting with new genres and the overall production of the album.

Brave is the only studio album by A-Mei to date to not receive a nomination for a Golden Melody Award. Despite that, Brave still ended up becoming a commercial success. It was the eleventh best-selling album of 2003 in Taiwan with over 170,000 copies sold, and sold 1.6 million copies throughout Asia in total. To help promote the album, A-Mei embarked on a series of live performances and appearances throughout Taiwan.

== Background ==
In order to fit in with the social atmosphere, A-Mei wanted to spread her innate passion and vitality, hoping to inspire and encourage her listeners. On May 18, 2003, it was announced that her new album would incorporate genres such as hip hop and rap for the first time. The album was developed by the Korean musician Jae Chong, Will Lin, Martin Tang, Ma Yu-fen, Xu Guangyi and Arys Chien. At the beginning of collecting songs, A-Mei often went to different live bars with the producer to listen to songs, and expressed her feelings about music through her favorite music style; the music style of the entire album was slowly integrated in this way. With the album Brave, Warner Music was confused about which song should be the title song. For this reason, Warner held an open and sincere public hearing for A-Mei's fans to vote for their preferred title song. In order to avoid unauthorized recording of the unreleased songs, Warner was strict in checking every fan's bag and body with professional security personnel to find out any recordable equipment that could be entrusted to them before they were allowed to enter the show.

== Writing and composition ==
The album's title track, "See Themselves" and "Fake It" are covers of Korean language songs. The original version of "Brave" is a super popular Korean song called "The End of the Waiting is You (내기다림의끝이그대이길)" by Juri; the first time A-Mei heard the Korean version of this song, she felt a very poignant feeling. "See Themselves" is a cover of the song "When I'm Feeling Blue" by Juri. The arrangement of "Fake It" is similar to the song "Precious Love (귀한 사랑)" by Chae Jung-an. "It's Me Who's Missing You" is a brisk-styled song that is the work of mainland China's rising star at the time Khalil Fong. "Rescue" is a folk pop song.

"Hate That I Love You" expresses the bitterness and incomprehension of love. "Never Mind" is a jazz and hip-hop influenced song. "Goosey," which also takes loneliness as its theme, uses a coquettish and threatening tone, showing an unconcealable sexiness. "Because I" is based on reggae, mixed with rock, and hummed repeatedly with extremely simple words, creating an extremely happy atmosphere and showing the fun of ska music. The closing number, "Forget," expresses a situation of forgetting one's own emotional situation because of deep love; presented with gospel-style music, it is not limited to the love between men and women, hoping to have a soothing effect.

== Title and artwork ==
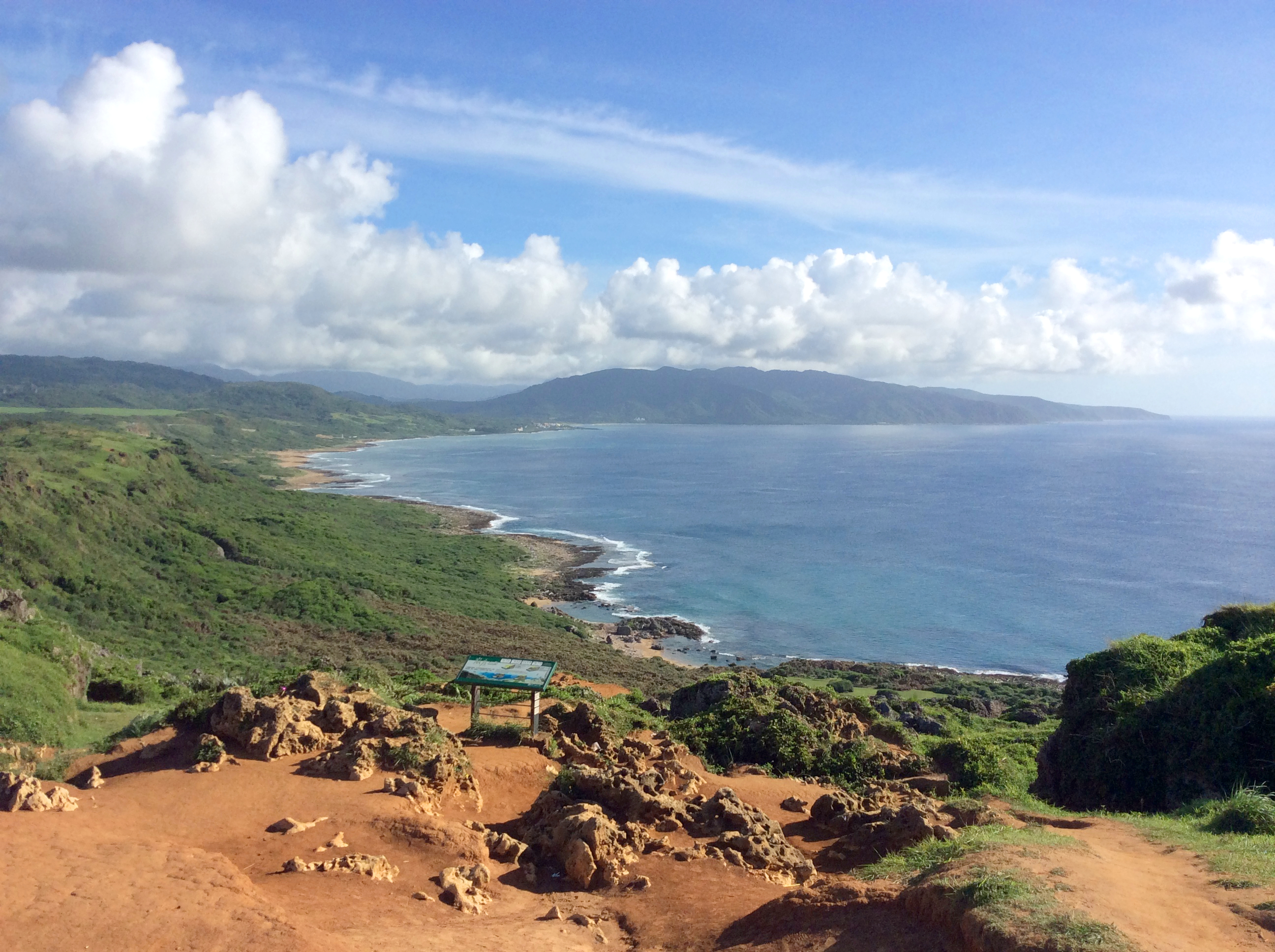
The album's cover and photo booklet was photographed at Kenting National Park.

The album was named Brave due to A-Mei hoping to encourage and inspire all of her listeners. In order to present the healthy and natural beauty of the album Brave, the cover photo shoot was originally planned to be taken abroad; due to the SARS epidemic, the film was shot in Kenting National Park. The album art shows A-Mei with her hair down while wearing a bikini with a silk jacket. It was reported that for this look, not only did the record company buy several sets of bikinis with a strong sense of design to match the look, but also contributed all the bikinis she had bought from various places over the years.

== Release and promotion ==
On June 11, 2003, the album was made available for pre-order. Game agent Huayi Digital Entertainment held the "Fall in Love with A3 Product Launch Conference" on June 17, 2003, inviting A-Mei to be the lead singer of the Chinese version of the game theme song. The songs "See Themselves" and the album's title track served as the theme songs for the Korean online game software "A3," which A-Mei was paid NT$12 million to endorse. The album's hardcover edition came with the CD of the game.

On June 18, 2003, the album's lead single, "Brave", premiered on various radio stations in Asia, including in mainland China, Taiwan, Hong Kong, Malaysia, and Singapore. The following day, it was announced that more than 20,000 copies had been pre-ordered in Taiwan within the first three days. On June 27, 2003, A-Mei held a press conference for the album premiere in Taipei, Taiwan.

=== Live performances ===
The high sales of Brave convinced A-Mei's record company to spend tens of millions to hold three "It's Me Who's Missing You" summer concerts in Taitung's Seaside Park, Sizihwan and Fulong Beach. The first concert was held at Taitung's Seaside Park on July 12, 2003. The second was held on July 19, 2003, and featured Machi. The final concert on July 26, 2003, was held at Fulong Beach and guest-starred Tanya Chua. In the second half of 2003 the A-Class Entertainment World Tour was held in Kuala Lumpur, Montville, Las Vegas and other places. On September 20, 2003, A-Mei performed at the TVBS 10th Anniversary Gala. A-Mei was one of the performing artists at the Superstar Concert that was held at the Shandong Provincial Stadium on September 26, 2003. On the evening of September 27, 2003, the 4th China Golden Eagle TV Art Festival Star Concert was held in Changsha, which included singers such as Kangta, A-Mei, Stefanie Sun, Zhou Xun and Pu Shu performing on stage. On October 24, 2003, A-Mei participated in the Warner Music 10th Anniversary Charity Concert at Beijing Workers' Stadium; she sung alongside her labelmates Aaron Kwok, Na Ying, Sun Nan, Stefanie Sun and Sammi Cheng. On October 26, 2003, A-Mei, Jay Chou and others performed at the China Heart Gala in front of more than 20,000 spectators.

=== Singles and music videos ===
The movie version of the "Brave" music video was directed by director Teng Yung-Shing. It took A-Mei 10 days and 10 nights to complete the filming. Each time, she shot from 3 a.m. to 4 or 5 a.m. the next morning. The production cost of the music video was NT$8 million, but A-Mei didn't get paid a penny, and one of the most NG scenes in the whole drama was her passionate scene with Miao Zijie. In the movie, A-Mei plays a foreign girl who comes to Taipei to work and has beautiful fantasies about love just like any other girl. The music video for "Fake It" was directed by Xu Renfeng. A-Mei found Miluko, a dance teacher who is good at R&B and hip-hop, to choreograph the video; during the shooting, A-Mei is seen jumping from the chair to a high platform neatly. The music video for "It's Me Who's Missing You," which was also directed by Xu Renfeng, co-starred actor Ethan Juan. In January 2004, the tracks "Brave" and "Fake It" were listed at number 17 and number 58 respectively on 2003's Hit FM Top 100 Singles of the Year chart.

== Critical reception ==
Stephan Lee from Sina Music commented: "A-Mei's latest Mandarin album “Brave” is considered to be her best album since she joined Warner. The album features a wide range of song styles and A-Mei tries her hand at different genres, while the quality of the songs is even higher than her last two albums Fever and Truth."

Sohu Entertainment expressed: "The spirit of the whole album hopes to give people a kind of strength. Between the sad and heart-wrenching love songs and the happy and pure fast songs, after experiencing joy and sorrow, you will eventually find a kind of strength to let you have the courage to face yourself, face the future, and move forward bravely."

== Accolades ==
The song "Brave" became the champion song in the gay love song vote that year. In January 2004, "Brave" won the Best Song Award (Hong Kong and Taiwan) at the 10th China Music Awards. At the same ceremony, she also won the award for Best Female Singer of Hong Kong and Taiwan. At the MTV Asia Awards 2004, A-Mei won the award for Favorite Artist Taiwan for the second time. On June 19, 2004, A-Mei won the Best Female Singer Award in Taiwan at the 2003 Music IN China TOP Chart Awards for this album.

== Track listing ==
Brave track listing
No.	Title	Lyrics	Music	Arrangement	Length
1.	"See Themselves" (看見自己)	Kate Liao	Kim Hyeon-Cheol	Wang Meilian	4:21
2.	"Fake It" (假惺惺)	Shefang	Jae Chong	Jae Chong	3:31
3.	"It's Me Who's Missing You" (就是我想你)	Tian Tian	Khalil Fong	Wang Meilian	4:12
4.	"Brave" (勇敢)	Chen Jiawen; Xia Mu	Shin In Soo	Eric Hung	3:59
5.	"Rescue" (解圍)	Tanya Chua	Tanya Chua	Will Lin; Li Yuhuan; Robert Gen	3:35
6.	"Hate That I Love You" (我為什麼那麼愛你)	Daryl Yao	Arys Chien	Baby Chung	4:55
7.	"Never Mind" (無所謂)	Cui Weikai	Jae Chong	Jae Chong	3:43
8.	"Goosey" (說傻話)	Xia Mu	Tanya Chua	Will Lin; Li Yuhuan; Robert Gen	3:27
9.	"Because I" (因為有我)	Will Lin	Will Lin	Will Lin; Robert Gen	4:01
10.	"Forget" (忘記)	Xia Mu	Sam Watters; Louis Biancaniello; Nick Lachey	Martin Tang	4:05
Total length:					39:55
