= Sisters (A-Mei album) =

Studio album by A-Mei
- Released: December 13, 1996
- Recorded: 1996
- Studio: Mega Force Studio; Platinum Studio (Taipei); Forward Studio; Da Sheng Studio; Studio C. (Singapore)
- Genre: Mandopop; R&B
- Length: 47:39
- Label: Forward Music
- Producer: Chang Yu-sheng; Yu Guangyan; Ma Yu-fen; Baby Chung; David Wu; Chen Fu-ming

A-Mei chronology
Sisters (1996)	Bad Boy (1997)

Sisters (Chinese: 姊妹; pinyin: Zǐmèi) is the debut studio album by Taiwanese singer A-Mei. It was released on December 13, 1996, by Forward Music. The album was primarily handled by Taiwanese producer Chang Yu-sheng, with the assistance of Yu Guangyan, Ma Yu-fen, Baby Chung, David Wu, and Chen Fu-ming. Musically, it experiments with genres such as pop, soul music, R&B, adult contemporary and easy listening to exhibit A-Mei's vocal talent and versatility. On June 23, 2017, 20 and a half years after its initial release date, a vinyl reissue of Sisters was released by Forward Music.

Prior to the album's release date, the higher-ups at Forward Music were concerned that A-Mei's aboriginal heritage would negatively impact the performance of the album, due to widespread discrimination against indigenous people in Taiwan at the time. Nevertheless, Sisters was a massive commercial success in Taiwan upon release. The record topped the Taiwan IFPI chart for a total of nine consecutive weeks and sold a total of 1.21 million copies in Taiwan and 4 million in Asia.

To promote Sisters, A-Mei and Forward Music released five singles; "You Don't Want Anything," "I'm a Dreamer on Air," "Cut Love," "Release" and the title track, all resulting in commercial success. The album's success paved the way for future popular Taiwanese aboriginal artists such as A-Lin and Jia Jia. Sisters currently ranks as the fourth highest-selling album of all time in Taiwan.

== Background and development ==
In 1992, A-Mei headed on a bus to Taipei and participated in the televised "Five Lights Singing Contest" on TTV Main Channel after encouragement from her father. She made it all the way through to the finals but lost in the final round. She was disappointed and considered giving up music until her father encouraged her to attended the singing contest again in 1993, which she later won in 1994. Her father died before getting to see her win, which affected A-Mei and inspired her to take a break from music afterwards. After her father's death, A-Mei struggled to recall her passion for music until 1995 when she started singing in local pubs with a rock band called "Relax" which was formed by her musician cousin. One of her pub performances impressed Taiwanese music producer Chang Yu-sheng and Chang Hsiao-yen, then-head of Taiwanese record label Forward Music. In March 1996, she signed a recording deal with Forward Music.

In order to let A-Mei be known to everyone earlier, before officially recording her personal album, Chang arranged for A-Mei to join him in the duet love song "The One Who Loved Me Most, Hurt Me The Most (最愛的人傷我最深)," and he also often took A-Mei to participate in variety shows. In November 1996, A-Mei was invited to sing "I'm a Dreamer on Air," the theme song for Taiwan's UFO Radio station, which further increased her popularity.

== Writing and recording ==
Sisters was primarily handled by Taiwanese producer Chang Yu-sheng—who served as A-Mei's primary vocal tutor, producer and supervisor until his death—with the assistance of Yu Guangyan, Ma Yu-fen, Baby Chung, David Wu, and Chen Fu-ming. The album's music incorporates a range of contemporary genres with a mix of slow ballads and up-tempo tracks, having been influenced by various genres and styles such as adult contemporary, funk, jazz and R&B. There are 10 full-length recorded songs on the album in total, all of which feature vocals from both A-Mei and various backing singers.

The lead single "You Don't Want Anything" was originally sung by Michelle Pan in February 1995 under the name "Who Makes Who Down (誰辜負誰)." Formerly planned to be on Pan's album "It's Time to Wake Up (該醒了)," it was delayed due to the acquisition of UFO Records by Warner Music. The composer Guo Tzu authorized the lyricist Wu Yukang to re-write the lyrics for A-Mei to sing for her version of the song. The songs "Sisters" and "Seafoam Blue Tears" were written and composed solely by Chang Yu-sheng. In the song "Sisters" he added in traditional Puyuma musical elements and invited A-Mei's mother, sisters and other relatives to sing along with her in the upbeat chorus. Lyrically, the song reflects on the deep love between sisters and family. In 2016, to commemorate the 20th anniversary of her debut, A-Mei sang a re-arranged version of the album's title track. The Acoustic soul-guitar-driven ballad "Release" written by Jonathan Koh lyrically talks about finding a new direction and moving forward after a difficult romantic breakup. "Impulse" is an R&B influenced track.

"Cut Love" was written by producer Michael Tu for his wife Huang Qishan. However, after the two divorced, Tu gave the song to A-Mei to sing, and the lyrics of "Cut Love" were filled in by Eric Lin. "Betrayal" is a snazzy soul influenced song. "Love Until You Can't Receive" is a ballad written by Jonathan Koh and arranged by Ricky Ho that describes the feeling of emotional scars in a relationship which also features drums, guitars, and digital synthesizers. "Seriously" is a synthesizer-heavy ballad. "I'm a Dreamer on Air" is a mellow easy listening ballad.

== Commercial performance and legacy ==
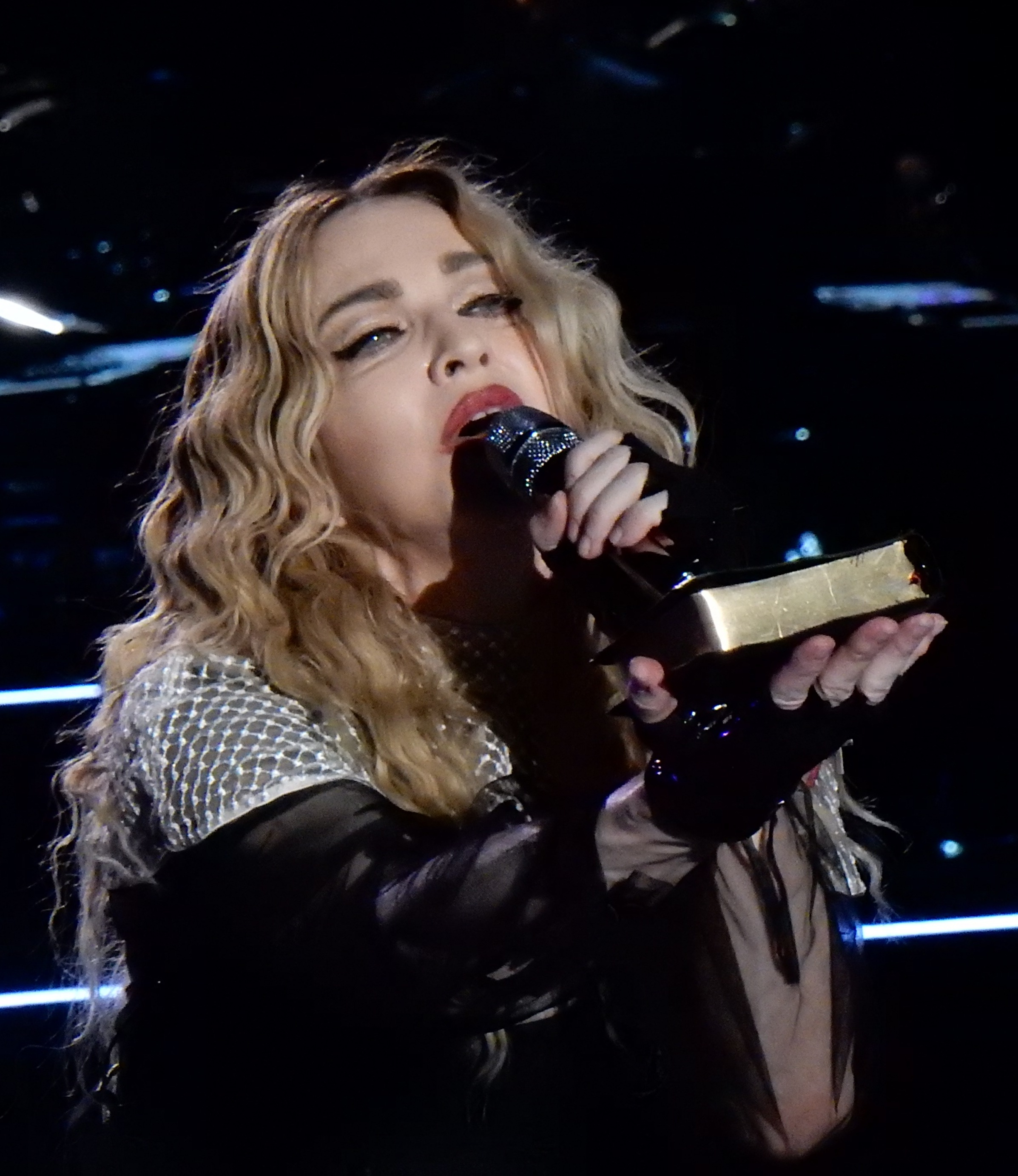
A-Mei's meteoric rise to fame was compared to the similar experience of American artist Madonna (pictured), where she was dubbed as "Taiwan's Madonna" or "Queen of Mandopop."

Commercially, Sisters experienced major success in the Sinophone world. The album sold 300,000 copies within a week of its release, and sales in Taiwan exceeded one million by 1997. According to various published sources and journalists, the album sold 1.21 million units in Taiwan alone and 4 million throughout Asia. It topped Taiwan's IFPI chart for a record breaking nine weeks. Sisters is ranked the fourth highest-selling album of all time in Taiwan behind two album entries by Jacky Cheung and A-Mei's album Bad Boy. The success of Sisters also awarded A-Mei with numerous accolades and recognition. The lead single "You Don't Want Anything" won the "Silver Award for Most Popular Mandarin Song" at the 1997 Jade Solid Gold Best Ten Music Awards Presentation. The album also won a Gold Record at the 1997 Hong Kong Golden Disc Awards Ceremony, won one of the top ten excellent albums and top ten singles of 1997 by the Chinese Musicians Exchange Association, and eventually was placed at No. 10 in the selection of the "200 Best Taiwanese Popular Music Albums."

Despite there still being widespread discrimination for Taiwanese aborigines at the time of its release, Sisters defied expectations and A-Mei became the very first A-lister to repeatedly flaunt her aboriginal identity to the mainstream media. The commercial performance of Sisters surprised Forward Music, since they had low expectations for it, and even forgot to sign her up for the 8th Golden Melody Awards. As a result of the album's success in the 1990s, A-Mei was noted by journalists and commentators as a trendsetter in the Greater China region, where her influence was dubbed as "sister power." Consequently, some journalists described her meteoric rise to the top to the experiences of Madonna. This comparison inspired Western media to dub A-Mei with honorific titles such as the "Queen of Mandopop" or "Taiwan's Madonna."

Before the release of Sisters, there were many singers with Taiwanese aboriginal ancestry in Taiwan's entertainment industry, such as Yulunana Tanivu, Shen Wen-cheng, Sammi Kao, Wan Sha Lang, Qian Bai Hui, and Gao Jin Sumei. Despite this, A-Mei was the first popular singer in Taiwan to continually emphasize being aboriginal to the media. Many later generations of Aboriginal singers, such as A-Lin, Jia Jia, Francesca Kao, Landy Wen, and Samingad cited A-Mei as the godmother of Aboriginal pop music. Many Aboriginal singers began to attract attention because of the appearance of A-Mei.

== Track listing ==
No.	Title	Lyrics	Music	Arrangement	Length
1.	"原來你什麼都不要" (You Don't Want Anything)	Wu Yukang	Guo Tzu	Li Bojie	4:47
2.	"姊妹" (Sisters)	Chang Yu-sheng	Chang Yu-sheng	Wang Jikang	4:22
3.	"解脫" (Release)	Daryl Yao	Jonathan Koh	Jonathan Koh	4:43
4.	"衝動" (Impulse)	Yu Guangyan; Yu Meiming	Baby Chung	Baby Chung	4:20
5.	"水藍色眼淚" (Seafoam Blue Tears)	Chang Yu-sheng	Chang Yu-sheng	Baby Chung	5:34
6.	"剪愛" (Cut Love)	Eric Lin	Michael Tu	Michael Tu	4:41
7.	"背叛" (Betrayal)	KiKi Hu	David Wu	Wang Jikang	4:32
8.	"愛到不能收" (Love Until You Can't Receive)	Wang Zhongyan	Jonathan Koh	Ricky Ho	5:12
9.	"認真" (Seriously)	Zhang Fanglu	Chen Chih-yuan	Wang Jikang	4:20
10.	"空中的夢想家" (I'm a Dreamer on Air)	Andy Yang	Chen Chih-yuan	Chen Chih-yuan	4:56
Total length:					47:39

== Charts ==
=== Weekly charts ===
Chart (1996)	Peak position
Hong Kong Albums (IFPI)	10
Taiwanese Albums (IFPI Taiwan)	1

=== Year-end charts ===
Chart (1996)	Position
Taiwanese Albums (IFPI Taiwan)	1

== Sales and certifications ==
Region	Certification	Certified units/sales
Hong Kong (IFPI Hong Kong)	Gold	10,000^{*}
Taiwan (RIT)	3× Platinum+Gold	1,210,000
Summaries
Asia	—	4,000,000
^{*} Sales figures based on certification alone.
