= Amit (album) =

- White limited edition cover

Studio album by A-Mei
- Released: June 26, 2009
- Recorded: 2007–2009
- Studio: Mega Force Studio (New Taipei City)
- Genre: Pop; Rock
- Length: 41:06
- Language: Mandarin
- Label: Gold Typhoon
- Producer: A-Mei; Adia

A-Mei chronology
Star (2007)	Amit (2009)	R U Watching? (2011)

Alternative cover
- Black limited edition cover

Singles from Amit
- 1. "Split" Released: June 10, 2009

Amit (Chinese: 阿密特; pinyin: Ā mì tè) is the fifteenth studio album by Taiwanese recording artist A-Mei. It was released in physical and digital formats on June 26, 2009, through Gold Typhoon. A-Mei enlisted Adia to help produce the album, while musicians such as Sodagreen's Wu Qing-feng, Xiao An, Albert Leung, Yao Ruolong, Chen Zhenchuan penned the record's lyrics. Amit is primarily a rock record with elements of punk, heavy metal and acoustic styles.

Amit received positive reviews from music critics. The album experienced commercial success, peaking at number one on the G-Music Combo Album Chart in Taiwan and ranking within the top 15 best-selling albums of the year in the country. It eventually garnered sales of over 120,000 copies in Taiwan and over 1,300,000 copies across Asia.

Amit spawned several singles, including "Split", "Disappear", "Bold For My Love", and "Rainbow". The album and its singles received various accolades at regional award ceremonies; at the 21st Golden Melody Awards, Amit won Pop Album of the Year whereas "Bold For My Love" won Song of the Year, amongst other awards. The Chinese Musicians Exchange Association named Amit one of the top 10 albums of the year, and included "Disappear" and "Straight Up" in their list of the top 10 singles of the year.

== Background and development ==
At the 19th Golden Melody Awards on July 5, 2008, A-Mei brought her "Amit" performance style to the big stage for the first time with pop punk music. The album Amit was developed over a period of 834 days and reportedly cost NT$30 million to produce. It was promoted as a reinvention of the singer’s artistic identity, with “Amit” representing a new persona and the concept of “Amei – Music Is Transformed.” The album marked a deliberate departure from A-Mei’s established pop-ballad style and her long‑standing commercial image. Prior to Amit, critics noted that her releases had become increasingly formulaic, contributing to aesthetic fatigue within Mandopop. In response, A-Mei and her team sought to dismantle the stylistic conventions that had defined her earlier work, including sentimental pop ballads, polished idol aesthetics, and rigid corporate positioning. Amit incorporates elements of rock, alternative music, and indigenous Puyuma folk traditions. The album features prominent band arrangements, heavy guitar textures, and electronic noise influences. The recording process was intense: she and producer Adia worked from scratch, selecting from over 100 songs and shaping a rock‑leaning sound. According to Taiwanese media reports, around midnight on May 5, 2009, A-Mei wrapped up recording her new album under the name "Amit."

As for the behind-the-scenes production team, the record company invited many musicians, including Sodagreen band lead singer Wu Qing-feng, music creator Andrew Chen, lyricist Daryl Yao, and A-Mei's manager Isaac Chen, to participate in the creation and production of the album. In addition, the album not only includes the songs that A-Mei composed under the name "Amit," but also includes the works of A-Mei's mother.

== Writing and recording ==
The concept of Amit explores A-Mei's multifaceted personality. The songs express the singer's evolving perspectives on life, including her exploration of life's purpose, her stance on LGBTQ+ rights, as well as women's rights. Observers have noted that the album offers a glimpse into the aspects of A-Mei's life that are not usually visible to the public eye, thereby providing a platform for expressing her thoughts and emotions. Primarily a rock record, Amit utilizes various styles including punk, heavy metal, R&B with both electric and acoustic guitar instrumentations.

"Straight Up" is a heavy metal rock song that expresses Amit's musical personality and attitude. "Double Cross" is a heavy rock song that describes the female consciousness very clearly. "Split" depicts split images to construct a dual personality monologue. "Disappear" is a composition of similar style which was penned by Wu Qing-feng, drawing inspiration from A-Mei's interviews about the death of her father. The final version that was included on the album, in contrast, is more lucid and gentle. "Depressed" realistically presents the sexual ecology of urban men and women.

"Weight of the Soul" is a melancholic song that depicts the struggle and helplessness of the soul. "Bold For My Love" is an electronic rock song sung in Taiwanese Hokkien. "OK" is a hysterical rock song; the recording crew treated the recording studio as a party, singing and recording randomly, and playing casually. "Dreams You Can Hear" is an inspirational song that serves as the theme for the 2009 Summer Deaflympics; the version included on the album only contains guitar strumming and humming. The album's title track features aboriginal chanting. "Rainbow" is a pop rock number that has been recognized as a LGBT anthem in Asia following the album's release. Its lyrics describe how the singer overcomes a failed relationship with the support of her friend.

== Release and cover artwork ==
The standard version of Amit was released in digital formats on June 26, 2009. In Taiwan, the physical CD was distributed in two versions: a white limited edition and a black limited edition. The CD was made available in China beginning on August 5. A sensory upgraded edition was made available in Taiwan on August 21, which contains a new DVD and a new track titled "Sorrowful Regret". A Hong Kong special edition was released on September 18, which contains a new track titled "Cong Cin Si Gu Mung".

On the album cover of Amit, A-Mei is shown sporting blood orange colored hair and is seen sitting on a leather red chair, designed by BD Barcelona. The chair, worth NT$430,000, takes inspiration from Metro-Goldwyn-Mayer (MGM) musicals that were produced after the roaring 1920s era.

=== Singles and music videos ===
The music video for “Double Cross” was directed by Bill Chia. The video includes scenes of kidnapping, S&M‑themed styling, and assassination, and elements such as the narrow slits in the set were criticized for being sexually suggestive. The music video for "Split" cost NT$2 million and was directed by Bill Chia. The music video for "Disappear" was directed by Bill Chia was filmed on the grassland, with a blue sky, green grass, and a gentle breeze. A-Mei stood in the wilderness, and countless English letters flew out of the open book. Fans with sharp eyes even managed to identify the words "DAD," "DIED," and "MISS," which corresponded to A-Mei's feelings of missing her deceased father. The music video for "Depressed" was directed by Bill Chia and features a scene of a man and woman having sex completely naked, with only the key areas highlighted with light spots that move around in sync with their movements.

The music video for “Bold For My Love” was filmed in a minimalist, fashion‑forward style, creating a sharp contrast with the traditional image of Taiwanese‑language songs and highlighting Amit’s unique sense of alternative fashion; the video also incorporates Romanized lyrics through visual compositing. In the video, A-Mei appears in two distinctive looks: one is a red wide‑sleeved dress by Rei Kawakubo, paired with a punk‑inspired hairstyle; the other is a white suit with a black cut‑out long skirt, matched with a gold punk short haircut. In 2021, A-Mei released the official music video for "Rainbow" in 1080p HD; the music video combined live concert footage with aerial shots, showcasing a diverse crowd and featuring a giant rainbow flag.

== Accolades ==
Awards and nominations for Amit
Organization	Year	Award	Nominee	Result	Ref.
Chinese Musicians Exchange Association	2010	Top 10 Albums of the Year	Amit	Won	
Chinese Musicians Exchange Association	2010	Top 10 Singles of the Year	"Disappear"	Won	
Chinese Musicians Exchange Association	2010	Top 10 Singles of the Year	"Straight Up"	Won	
Golden Melody Awards	2010	Song of the Year	"Bold For My Love"	Won	
Golden Melody Awards	2010	Pop Album of the Year	Amit	Won	
Golden Melody Awards	2010	Best Female Pop Vocal Performance	Amit	Won	
Golden Melody Awards	2010	Best Music Video Award	"Bold For My Love"	Nominated	
Golden Melody Awards	2010	Best Album Packaging Award	Amit	Nominated	
Metro Radio Music Awards	2009	Mandarin Power Songs Award	"Depressed"	Won	

== Track listing ==
Amit – Standard edition
No.	Title	Length
1.	"Straight Up" (開門見山)	4:15
2.	"Double Cross" (黑吃黑)	3:15
3.	"Split" (分生)	3:59
4.	"Disappear" (掉了)	3:58
5.	"Depressed" (相愛後動物感傷)	3:53
6.	"Weight of Soul" (靈魂的重量)	4:04
7.	"Bold For My Love" (好膽你就來)	3:29
8.	"Ok"	3:24
9.	"Dreams You Can Hear" (聽得見的夢想)	2:01
10.	"Amit" (阿密特（給親人+來唱歌吧+等待豐收的父親）)	4:24
11.	"Rainbow" (彩虹)	4:24
Total length:		41:06

Amit – Sensory upgraded edition
No.	Title	Length
12.	"Sorrowful Regret" (梦中作憨人)	4:09

Amit – Hong Kong special edition
No.	Title	Length
13.	"Cong Cin Si Gu Mung" (床前思故梦)	4:12

== Charts ==
Chart (2009)	Peak position
Taiwanese Albums (G-Music)	1

== Sales and certifications ==
Region	Certification	Certified units/sales
Taiwan	—	120,000
Summaries
Asia	—	1,300,000

== Release history ==
Region	Date	Edition(s)	Format(s)	Label
Various	June 26, 2009	Standard	Digital download; streaming	Gold Typhoon
Taiwan	June 26, 2009	White limited edition	CD	Gold Typhoon
Taiwan	June 26, 2009	Black limited edition	CD	Gold Typhoon
Taiwan	June 26, 2009	Double cover version	CD	Gold Typhoon
China	August 5, 2009	Double cover version	CD	Gold Typhoon
Taiwan	August 21, 2009	Sensory upgraded edition	CD+DVD	Gold Typhoon
China	August 26, 2009	Celebration edition	CD	Gold Typhoon
Hong Kong	September 18, 2009	Hong Kong special edition	CD	Gold Typhoon
Taiwan	May 20, 2016	New XRCD	CD	Warner Music Taiwan
Taiwan	August 9, 2017	Special edition	LP	Warner Music Taiwan
Taiwan	December 18, 2020	Special edition	LP	Warner Music Taiwan
