= Truth (A-Mei album) =

Studio album by A-Mei
- Released: October 29, 2001
- Recorded: 2001
- Studios: Platinum Studio (Taipei); Premium Studio; Mega Force Studio; Atomic Studios Pte Ltd. (Singapore); Maestro Studio; Audioplex Studio Singapore
- Genre: Pop
- Length: 47:26
- Label: Warner Music
- Producers: Peter Lee; Tino Bao; Eric Chen

A-Mei chronology
Journey (2001)	Truth (2001)	Fever (2002)

Singles from Truth
- 1. "Senses" Released: October 27, 2001

Truth (Chinese: 真實; pinyin: Zhēnshí) is the ninth studio album by Taiwanese singer A-Mei. It was released on October 29, 2001. The album was her first album to be released after joining Warner Music Taiwan in June 2001. Crafted collaboratively with musicians such as Tino Bao, Kevin Yi, Peter Lee, Eric Chen and JJ Lin, it incorporates genres such as pop, Latin pop, R&B, hip-hop and adult contemporary.

The album received positive reviews from music critics, who complimented the album's production. Commercially, the album was a success; it sold over 1.6 million copies in Asia, and was ranked as one of the top 20 best-selling albums of 2001 in Taiwan. The album has since sold over 200,000 copies in Taiwan to date. The following year, A-Mei won the Best Female Mandarin Singer award at the 13th Golden Melody Awards, which was the very first Golden Melody Award of her entire career.

== Background and development ==
On December 5, 2000, A-Mei released her final studio album under Forward Music, which was titled Regardless. Despite being releases hard on the heels of her controversy regarding singing the National Anthem of the Republic of China, the album still found commercial success. Regardless sold over 360,000 copies in Taiwan and 1 million across Asia. After the promotional activities for the album had ended, she severed ties with Forward Music and decided to jump the gun by joining a global record company that could promote her internationally. In June 2001, she found a home with Warner Music Taiwan. During the contract signing ceremony, A-Mei expressed her gratitude to Forward Music, for guiding and nurturing her to achieve what she had achieved, and showed her anticipation and excitement for the musical journey ahead with her new record company. Shortly after signing with Warner, she sang the Mandarin theme song for the movie Pearl Harbor, which was a cover of Faith Hill's "There You'll Be."

The album Truth was jointly created by musicians such as Tino Bao, Kevin Yi, Peter Lee, Eric Chen and JJ Lin. The songs on the album were carefully selected from hundreds of domestic and international candidates. Before the album's release date, Warner allowed netizens to vote for the album's title song on their official website and Yahoo. Fans had responded strongly, with more than 2 million people having listened to it on the web.

The song "Remember" was inspired by a fight JJ Lin had with his girlfriend when he was 17 years old over relationship issues; he and his first girlfriend had to separate because they each had their own dreams to follow. He didn't know how far he could go with her and wrote the song with those emotions in mind. During the creation process, Lin composed the music with the helplessness of being forced to separate from the one he loved, with a sad tone and a slower tempo. At the same time, the song “Remember” also records the time when Lin was a soldier serving his mandatory military service, holding a simple and persistent attitude towards his career or relationship. In 2001, Sam Chen, general manager of Warner Records Greater China, heard a demo of the song when he was working on A-Mei's album Truth. He tried to sign JJ Lin at one point but was unsuccessful, so he adopted the song and had it rewritten by Taiwanese lyricist Kevin Yi as "Remember."

== Writing and recording ==
The album's musical style is diverse and emotionally oriented, catering to a wide variety of audiences. The songs on the album are more "foreign," with A-Mei's voice moving through almost all of the songs at a medium to slow tempo with deep emotion.

"Senses" is a song written by A-Mei for the first time under the pen name Katsu. "Senses" is a Latin pop-inspired song with flamenco influences. "Hate That I Love You" is a mellow love song. The album's title track is a Mandarin cover song of Kim Hyun-seong's "Hope (소원)." The song "Thumbs Up" is a Mandarin cover song of Kinnda's "Don't Bring Sand to the Beach." The piano ballad "Remember" is a slow paced torch song.

"Forever Picture" is her first attempt at folk music. "A-Class Entertainment" presents a special attitude towards love, with dynamic and lively dance music and a big band's powerful arrangement. "Ladies Talk" is a mellow R&B slow jam. "Because You Didn't Say" is a guitar-driven ballad. "Moment" is the only rock-style song in the whole album. The album's closing track is a Mandarin cover of Faith Hill's "There You'll Be."

== Artwork ==
The album was photographed by Hong Kong's chief visual Team Sha La La's Xia Yongkang and Taiwanese photographer Huang Zhongping. In order to present A-Mei's sense of texture and fashion, the album's clothing was based on the spirit of glamour and spontaneity, and the hairstylist had boldly cut A-Mei's hair into a short, sleek haircut. This made her look closer to her own personality and showed off her figure and charisma. The butterfly jacket on the album cover was created by A-Mei and designer Han Zhongwei. The golden lace and denim undershirt add a touch of glamour and sexiness to the spontaneity.

== Release and promotion ==
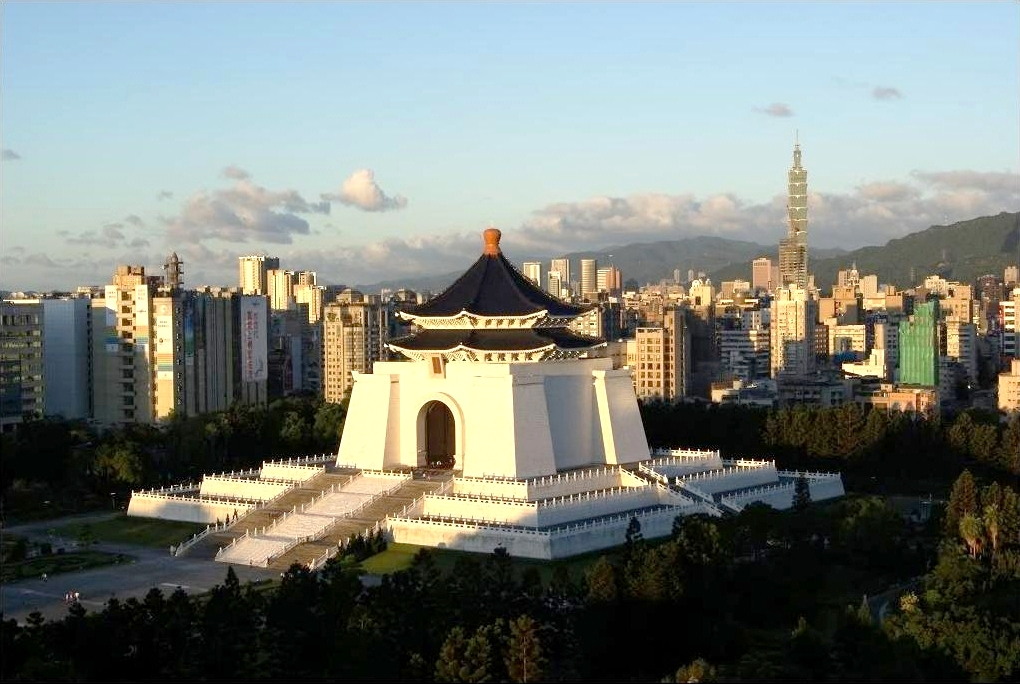
On November 9, 2001, A-Mei held the "Real New Song Concert" at the Chiang Kai-shek Memorial Hall to promote Truth

Warner Records generously purchased the largest theater in Warner Village Roadshow Studios on October 27, 2001, to host A-Mei's first public event before the release of Truth. At the event, the theater played the music video premieres for "Senses," "Remember," "Ladies Talk" and "A Class Entertainment." On November 9, 2001, in Taipei City, the "Real New Song Concert" was held at the Chiang Kai-shek Memorial Hall, where A-Mei held a free large-scale concert to promote the album. More than 30,000 fans were packed at the venue, allowing fans who had not seen each other for a long time to share her musical works over the past year. In December 2001, A-Mei held 7 concerts in the United States and Canada. The Toronto show at the Sears Theater was also the most successful solo concert held by a Taiwanese singer there in recent years. At the last performance of the tour in Silicon Valley, San Francisco, a small autograph session for 100 people was held. During the event the local mayor of Cupertino presented the "Outstanding Artist Award from Cross-Strait and Three Places." On December 31, 2001, she participated in a New Year's Eve concert in Taipei City. At the 13th Golden Melody Awards on May 4, 2002, A-Mei put on a showcase titled, "Best of Asia."

=== Singles and music videos ===
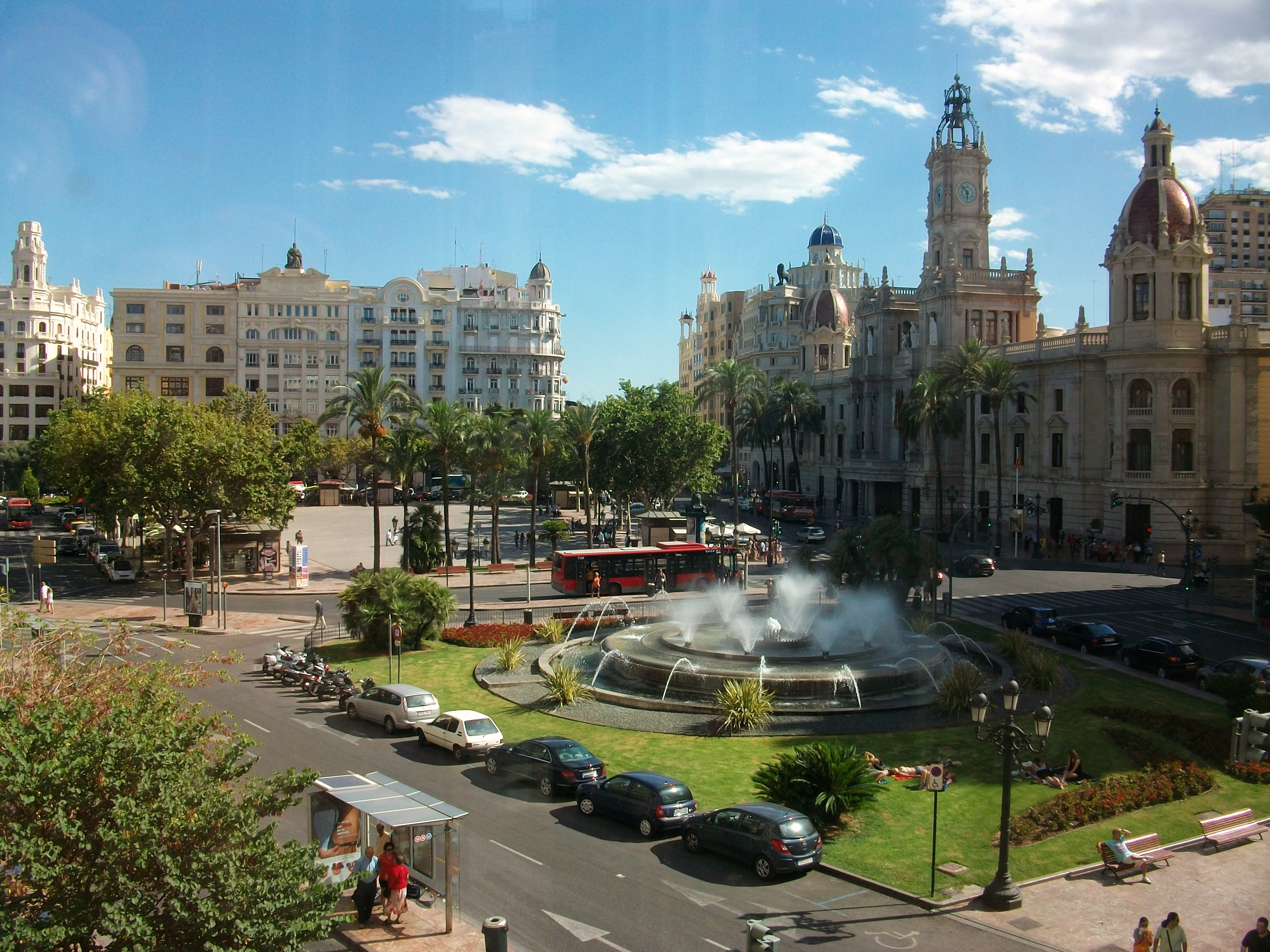
The music video for "Senses" was filmed in Valencia, Spain

The music video for the album's lead single "Senses," which was directed by Kuang Sheng, was filmed in Valencia, Spain. In order to ensure that A-Mei could dance in Spain, Warner Records asked Mr. Lafayette, the founder of the Flamenco Dance Academy, to assemble six dancers of the most professional standard to choreograph the video. When the footage of A-Mei dancing in the video was filmed, it happened to be Valencia's National Day, and local residents gathered in the church to watch mass. A-Mei and more than 40 staff members filmed the dance scene for the "Senses" music video in the "Virgin Square." Unexpectedly, as soon as A-Mei danced, residents and tourists stopped to watch. The whole square was bustling with activity, just like a large-scale party, and the crowd in the church was alarmed at some time.

The music video for "Remember" was directed by Shockley Huang. The video depicts doing tasks forlornly in her apartment. The music video for "Truth" was directed by Kuang Sheng and depicts A-Mei laying in bed and using a sewing machine in a dreary, frozen room. Throughout the video, there are interspersed scenes of A-Mei walking by a seashore. The video for "Hate That I Love You" was also directed by Kuang Sheng and depicts A-Mei singing in an empty park. The video for "Ladies Talk" was directed by Lai Weikang. The video for "A-Class Entertainment" was directed by Teng Yung-Shing. The music video for "Thumbs Up" was directed by Jeff Chang. The videos for "Because You Didn't Say" and "Forever Picture" used edited concert footage. In January 2002, the tracks "Remember" and "Senses" were listed at number 6 and number 36 respectively on the 2001 Hit FM Top 100 Singles of the Year chart.

== Reception ==
Professional ratings
Review scores
Source	Rating
MTVChinese.com	3.5/5 stars

Leo Liu of MTVChinese.com awarded the album three and a half stars out of five. At the end of the review, he stated: "In general, the production is very neat, and with A-Mei's voice as the thread, it sounds particularly beautiful. Although it is not a dazzling masterpiece, it can serve as a bridge between the old and the new. Compared with other singers who have switched to new agencies and are eager to show their talents but cannot, A-Mei's performance this time is a great success!" Tencent Music's Wave Review Panel ranked Truth at 43rd place in their list of the "200 Best Chinese Albums of 2001–2020."

== Accolades ==
The following year, A-Mei won the Best Mandarin Female Singer award for the very first time with the album Truth at the 13th Golden Melody Awards. A deserving win after four years of consecutive nominations in the same category since her second album Bad Boy. At the same ceremony, Truth was also nominated for Album of the Year. On January 25, 2002, the song "Senses" made it onto the leaderboard for Most Popular Song at the 8th Chinese Music Chart. In July 2012, the song "Remember" won the Singapore Lyric Copyright Society's Best Local Chinese Pop Song of the Year Award.

== Track listing ==
No.	Title	Lyrics	Music	Arrangement	Length
1.	"Opening"			Mr.B	0:31
2.	"感應" (Senses)	Katsu (Note: Katsu is the pseudonym of A-Mei.)	George Samuelson; Quint Starkie; Mikael Lundh	Lu Shaochun	3:36
3.	"我恨我愛你" (Hate That I Love You)	Zheng Shufei	Chen Dawei	Terence Teo	4:29
4.	"真實" (Truth)	Jennifer Hsu	Gyuman Cho	Tu Ying	4:39
5.	"了不起" (Thumbs Up)	Kevin Yi	Kandi Burruss; She'Kespere	Eric Hung	3:49
6.	"記得" (Remember)	Kevin Yi	JJ Lin	Goh Kheng Long	4:46
7.	"永遠的畫面" (Forever Picture)	Kate Liao	Guo Wenxian	Jamie Wilson	3:51
8.	"A級娛樂" (A-Class Entertainment)	Jennifer Hsu	Eric Ng	Anthony Bao	3:49
9.	"女人說" (Ladies Talk)	Kevin Yi	Tino Bao	Baby Chung	5:07
10.	"因為你沒說" (Because You Didn't Say)	Arys Chien; Kevin Yi	Arys Chien	Kenn C	4:35
11.	"瞬間" (Moment)	He Qi Hong; Wu Yizheng	Eric Ng	Ray Huang	4:23
12.	"排山倒海" (Mountainous Waves)	Lo-Jung Chen	Diane Warren	Baby Chung	3:40
Total length:					47:26
