= Star (A-Mei album) =

Studio album by A-Mei
- Released: August 3, 2007
- Genre: Pop; R&B
- Length: 52:42
- Language: Mandarin
- Label: EMI Taiwan
- Producer: A-Mei; Eric Chen; Ma Yu-fen; Jim Lee; Jamie Hsueh; Jae Chong

A-Mei chronology
I Want Happiness? (2006)	Star (2007)	Amit (2009)

Singles from Star
- 1. "Have You Heard Lately?" Released: July 11, 2007

Star is the fourteenth studio album released by Taiwanese singer A-Mei. It was released on August 3, 2007, by EMI Taiwan. It was produced by A-Mei herself with the assistance of Eric Chen, Ma Yu-fen, Jim Lee, Jamie Hsueh, and Jae Chong. The production of the album takes influence from several genres such as pop, rock, disco, jazz, bossa nova and rock ballads. The lead single "Have You Heard Lately?" premiered on July 11, 2007.

Star received mixed reviews from music critics, who praised the album's arrangements and A-Mei's vocal delivery, but stated that most of the songs lacked enough quality to become classics. It became a massive commercial success for A-Mei, dominating Taiwan's G-Music and five major record charts for four weeks and selling 130,000 copies in Taiwan and 1.7 million copies throughout Asia. In her native Taiwan, it became the country's fifth highest-selling album of 2007. A-Mei promoted Star by embarking on the Star World Tour, which spanned 20 concerts in Asia and the United States.

== Background and development ==
In April 2007, EMI Taiwan spent more than ten million to hold a pan-Asian press conference in Hong Kong that was meant to announce the signing of A-Mei to their company. During the event she signed a three-year and three album recording contract worth NT$150 million, making her the highest-paid female singer in the region at the time. A-Mei and her team had to select ten songs out of four or five hundred demo recordings for the album Star. A-Mei's album has a variety of styles such as the warm-up song "Distant Love" being sung by the champion of Dragon Television's Come On! Good Guys! Purba Rgyal, and the lead single is "Have You Heard Lately?," a lyrical song that Jay Chou wrote for A-Mei for the first time. During the recording, Jay Chou called A-Mei every day to ask about the progress of the recording and cared about the effect of the recording. A-Mei played the recorded song to Jay Chou, who praised it happily and made some suggestions for modification of a small part. After listening to it, A-Mei immediately went into the recording studio to re-record it. A-Mei became a producer for the first time for the album and produced the two songs "Forever Happiness" and "Summer Waves," saying that she was nervous and addicted to the producing process in general.

== Writing and recording ==
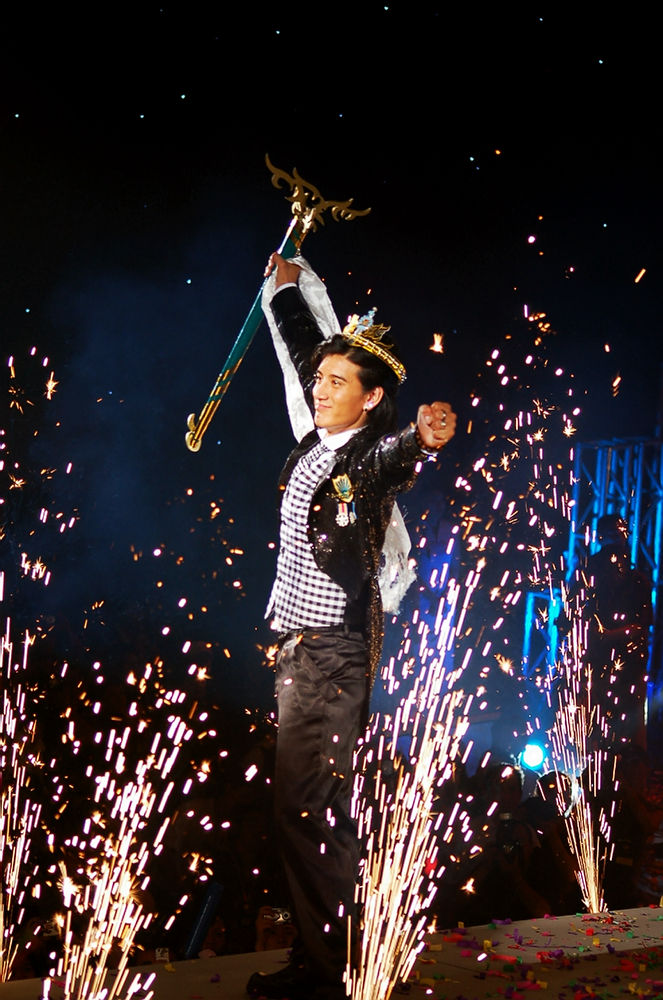
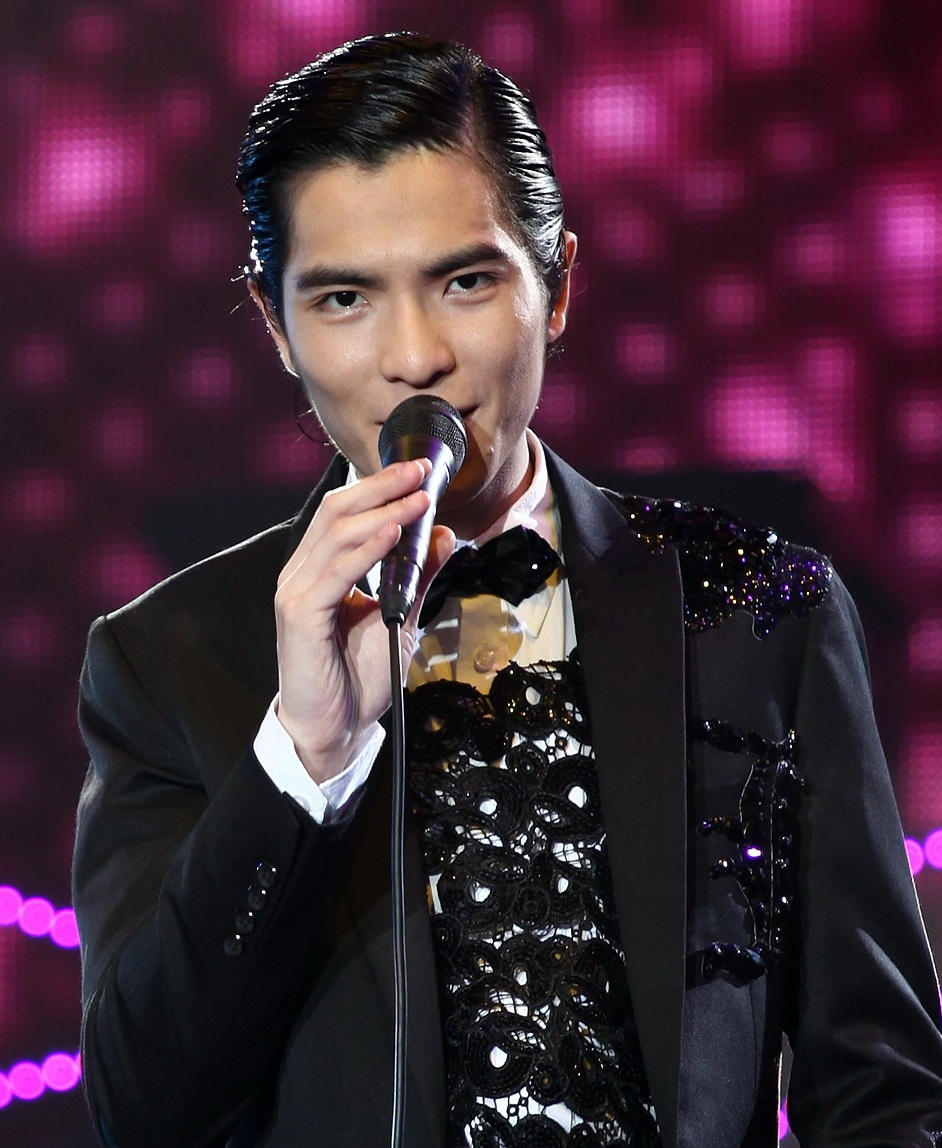
Purba Rgyal (left) and Jam Hsiao (right), two collaborators on the album

"Forever Happy" is an upbeat song with influences of jungle music and hard rock. "You Love Me" is an A-Mei style ballad that retains the unique and exclusive texture and vibe in commercial popular ballads. "Joy For Tears" is a ballad with the easy-to-understand and profound lyrics of Albert Leung. "Victoria's Secrets" is an up-tempo dance pop track. "Soul Mate" is a stripped down with warm melody lines and simple guitar chord orchestrations. "A Moment" is a power ballad that is performed with Jam Hsiao, who took part in the first season of China Television (CTV)'s star search show, One Million Star.

"So Good" is a bouncy R&B number with funk influences. "Big City" is an R&B and jazz song with a big band and gospel accompaniment. "Have You Heard Lately?" is a lyrical song with stacked chords, which accumulate emotions along with the lines of the chords, and lyrically depicts the helplessness in love. "Summer Waves" samples "Last Train to London" by Electric Light Orchestra. "Don't Sail Away" is a song that takes influence from bossa nova. The album track, "Distant Love," is a rock ballad sung with Purba Rgyal and rearranged the famous chorus in the musical stage play Fall in Love with Carmen. "Who Loves Me" is A-Mei's theme song in the musical stage play Fall in Love with Carmen, with a brand new arrangement and singing; this song is only available on the album's pre-order edition.

== Release ==
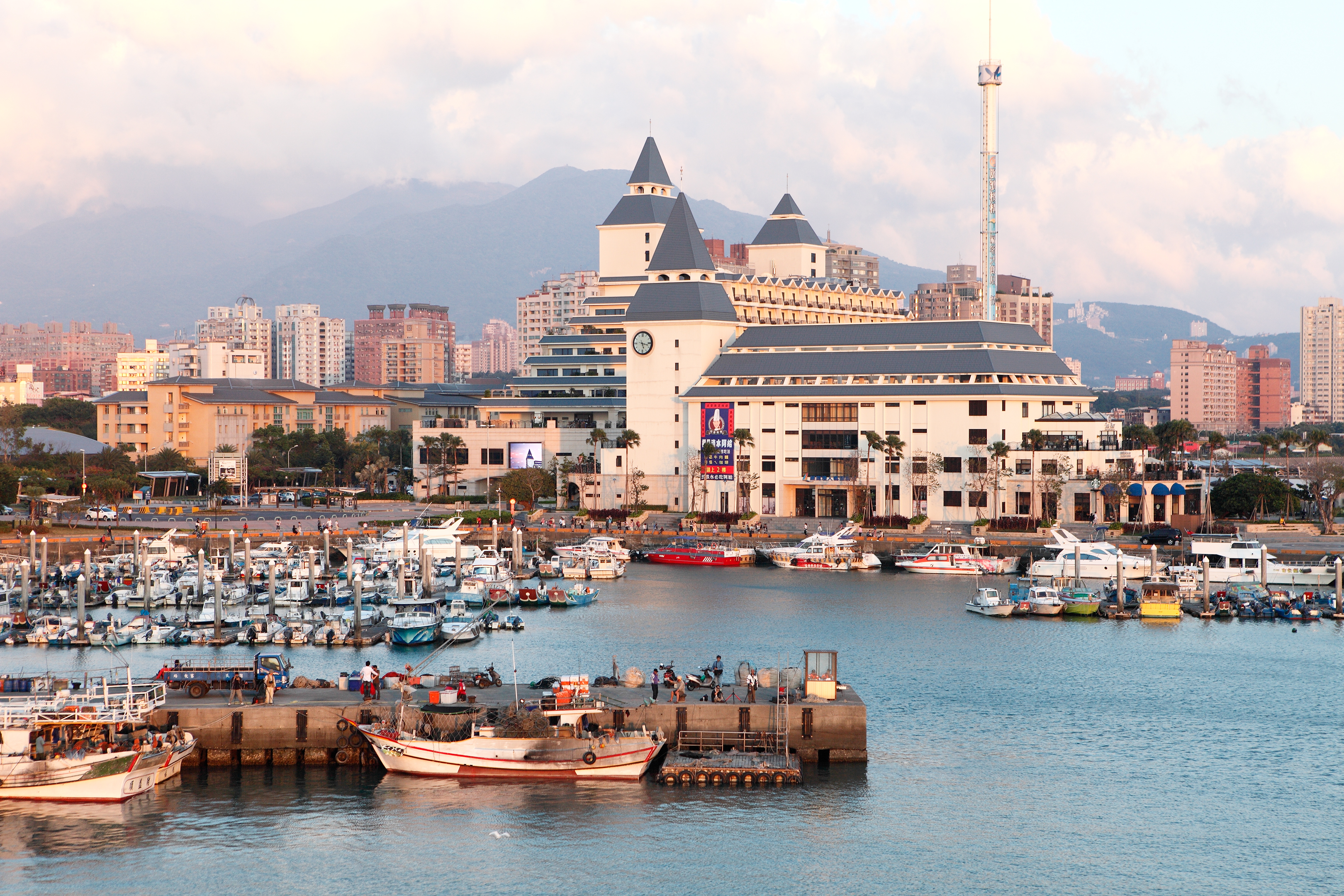
A-Mei promoted the album with a performance held at Tamsui Fisherman's Wharf.

On June 21, 2007, it was announced that A-Mei would release her new album on July 26. The album was made available for pre-order on July 20. In its first week of release, Star topped the weekly album sales charts of G-Music and Five Music. On September 9, 2007, A-Mei held a concert to promote Star at Tamsui Fisherman's Wharf.

On September 20, 2007, EMI released the live collector's edition of the album, which included live footage of A-Mei's "Live Celebration Concert" and the previously unreleased music documentary "Star New York Love Story Recollection" and a photo book. On January 4, 2008, Five Music ranked Star at number four on the year-end album sales chart for 2007. On January 11, 2008, G-Music ranked the album at number nine on the year-end album sales chart for 2007.

=== Title and artwork ===
The album was named Star due to A-Mei always loving stars. For the costume design, EMI invited the stylist of Faye Wong and Sammi Cheng to dress A-Mei in a pink sequined dress with red fishnet stockings for the album artwork.

=== Singles and music videos ===
The music video for "Forever Happiness" was directed by Muh Chen. The music videos for the songs "Have You Heard Lately?," You Do Love Me," "Victoria's Secrets," "Joy For Tears," "Big City" and "Don't Sail Away" were all directed by Jinhe Lin. Jinhe Lin and Luo Ganshi jointly directed the music video for "A Moment." The music video for "Have You Heard Lately?" features six different A-Meis with different personalities and emotions talking to each other. The music video for "Victoria's Secrets" was filmed in New York City and A-Mei herself selected ten "gays" from the local area as extras. In January 2008, the tracks "Have You Heard Lately?" and "A Moment" were listed at number 20 and number 52 respectively on the 2007 Hit FM Top 100 Singles of the Year chart.

== Critical reception ==
Star received mixed reviews from most contemporary music critics. Sina Music's critic Stephen Lee gave Star a very favorable analysis, noting: "Furthermore, the quality of the songs in the album is also excellent. The songs have the power to penetrate people's hearts and can easily move people and resonate with their souls. They are beautiful lyrical works. Of course, if we insist on considering freshness and breakthrough in singing style as the only criteria, this album is certainly inadequate. But if we judge purely by the quality of the songs, the songs on this album Star are quite good. As for A-Mei's singing voice, it is still excellent. The feminine beauty and appeal in it are the advantages that other female singers dream of."

Tan Yize commented that the voice processing in the album was more intellectual, but that the songs lacked the powerful impact of her previous live performances. DJ/Chinese Song Chart Host Qi Lin commented that "Summer Waves" was the album's highlight, but noted that A-Mei's dance spirit had faded.

DJ/Host of Global Chinese Songs Chart Zhu Yun commented that the songs on Star were good, but felt like the past few albums, the positioning of being sexy was still confusing and that A-Mei's personality and musical features were still unclear. Music critic and executive editor of Beijing Youth Daily Wang Yi commented that the album was not much worse than the previous one in terms of listenability. He also criticized Purba Rgyal's vocal performance.

== Accolades ==
In 2008, the album Star was nominated for Best Mandarin Album and Best Mandarin Female Singer at the 19th Golden Melody Awards, and it also received the Hong Kong–Taiwan Recommended Album Award from the MusicRadio China Top Chart.

== Live performances ==
On September 22, 2007, A-Mei participated in the fourth Asia Song Festival in Seoul, South Korea, performing in front of 40,000 spectators from all over the world. On September 25, 2007, A-Mei performed the song "Have You Heard Lately?" and "Summer Waves" at the "Bright Moon Over the Chinese Heart - 2007 Global Chinese Mid-Autumn Festival Gala" held at Happy Valley Shenzhen.

=== Touring ===
On October 23, 2007, news outlets reported that A-Mei turned down a film offer to appear in the 2009 film Terminator Salvation so she could embark on her tenth anniversary tour. She kicked off her Star Tour on November 3, 2007, at the Shanghai Stadium. On March 29, 2009, the tour capped off with a performance at the Taipei Arena. A-Mei's Star "Live Celebration Concert" held at Tamsui Fisherman's Wharf on September 8, 2007, was released on DVD on January 31, 2008. The Star Tour lasted for over one year and five months and held 20 shows in Taiwan, mainland China, Hong Kong, Singapore, Malaysia, Japan, Canada and United States, attracting more than 500,000 spectators.

== Track listing ==
No.	Title	Lyrics	Music	Arrangement	Length
1.	"永遠的快樂" (Forever Happiness)	Isaac Chen; Ashura	Ashura	Martin Tang	4:04
2.	"你是愛我的" (You Do Love Me)	Wu Yukang	Yang Yang	Yang Yang	3:58
3.	"快樂眼淚" (Joy For Tears)	Albert Leung	Yang Yang	Goh Kheng Long	4:57
4.	"薇多莉亞的秘密" (Victoria's Secrets)	Isaac Chen	Gary Chaw	Jae Chong	2:49
5.	"知己" (Soul Mate)	Yi Jet Qi	Rao Shanqiang	Wu Guanyan	4:43
6.	"一眼瞬間" (A Moment)	Yu-Kang Wu	Gary Chaw	Goh Kheng Long	5:56
7.	"So Good"	Mitlin; Wei; Alex Ni	Alex Ni	Lau Chi Yuen; Alex Ni	3:41
8.	"Big City"	Matilda Tao	Lars Quang; Nik Quang	Lau Chi Yuen	3:32
9.	"如果你也聽說" (Have You Heard Lately?)	Francis Lee	Jay Chou	Goh Kheng Long	5:13
10.	"夏天的浪花" (Summer Waves)	Zhuang Nu	Jefflyne	Lu Shao-chun	4:09
11.	"Don't Sail Away"	Kevin Kumar; Sean Kumar	Kevin Kumar; Sean Kumar	Kevin Kumar; Sean Kumar	5:20
12.	"兩端" (Distant Love)	Chen Xinyan	My-Mic	My-Mic	4:14
Total length:					52:42

Star – Pre-order edition
No.	Title	Lyrics	Music	Arrangement	Length
13.	"誰愛我" (Who Loves Me)	Wu Yukang	Chen Chih-Yuan	Goh Kheng Long	4:48

== Charts ==
=== Weekly charts ===
Chart (2007)	Peak position
Taiwanese Albums (G-Music)	1

=== Year-end charts ===
Chart (2007)	Position
Taiwanese Albums (Note: Best-selling albums of the year in Taiwan as reported by media outlets)	5
