= Journey (A-Mei album) =

Studio album by A-Mei
- Released: September 7, 2001
- Genre: Mandopop; R&B
- Label: Forward Music

A-Mei chronology
Regardless (2000)	Journey (2001)	Truth (2001)

Journey (Chinese: 旅程; pinyin: Lǚchéng) is the eighth studio album by Taiwanese singer A-Mei. It was released on September 7, 2001, by Forward Music. The album contains 18 songs that were recorded during A-Mei's tenure at Forward Music, but were never released. It also contains a bonus CD of eight English cover songs. The album sold over 100,000 copies in Taiwan and 1 million copies in Asia.

== Overview ==
This is a collection of unreleased songs from A-Mei's time at Forward Music. Reasons for not releasing these songs include: a song with a distinctly different style from the album, difficulty in choosing a song with the same style, or even the post-production period couldn't catch up with the release date. Forward Music had repeatedly emphasized that producing the Journey album for A-Mei was like making a graduation album, and watching A-Mei become a super diva from a novice in the singing world.

== Track listing ==
CD1
No.	Title	Lyrics	Music	Arrangement	Length
1.	"旅程" (Journey)	Yu Zhiming	Ji Zhongping	Baby Chung	5:17
2.	"驕傲" (Pride)	Wu Xiong; Chen Zhihan; Wu Yukang	Chang Yu-sheng	Martin Tang; Lu Shaochun	4:37
3.	"心誠則靈" (Sincerity Leads to Spirituality)	Jonathan Lee	Cao Junhong	Goh Kheng Long	4:48
4.	"愛已蔓延" (Love Has Spread)	Jerry Huang	Jerry Huang	Jerry Huang	4:11
5.	"家路" (Home Road)	Wu Yukang	Chen Chih-yuan	Chen Chih-yuan	5:26
6.	"倒數三秒" (Countdown to Three Seconds)	Wu Xiong; Chen Zhihan; Wu Yukang	Chen Chih-yuan	Huang Yi	4:15
7.	"雪地" (Snow)	Liu Zhihong	Liu Zhihong	Ricky Ho	5:09
8.	"愛或不愛" (Love or Hate)	Wu Yukang	Baby Chung	Baby Chung	4:40
9.	"讓你飛" (Let You Fly)	Yuan Wei-jen	Guo Tzu	Goh Kheng Long	5:52
10.	"你的顏色" (Your Color)	Wang Hai-Ling	Wang Jikang	Wang Jikang	4:17

CD2
No.	Title	Lyrics	Music	Original artist	Length
1.	"Come Together"	John Lennon	John Lennon	The Beatles	3:33
2.	"Addicted to Love"	Robert Palmer	Robert Palmer	Robert Palmer	5:28
3.	"Blue Bayou"	Roy Orbison; Joe Melson	Roy Orbison; Joe Melson	Jennifer Rush	4:06
4.	"Bizarre Love Triangle"	Stephen Morris; Bernard Sumner	Peter Hook; Gillian Gilbert	New Order	3:55
5.	"Now And Forever"	Richard Marx	Richard Marx	Richard Marx	3:24
6.	"Big Spender"	Dorothy Fields	Cy Coleman	Shirley Bassey	3:03
7.	"Can't Take My Eyes Off You"	Bob Gaudio	Bob Crewe	Frankie Valli	5:10
8.	"I Have Nothing"	Linda Thompson	David Foster	Whitney Houston	4:48
