= UFO Radio =

Taiwan Radio Station

UFO Radio (also known as UFO Network) is a radio station in Taiwan.

The station covers Chinese music and talk. It also plays international, country, rock, and folk music. UFO Radio was launched on 16 October 1996. It has the slogan "Air Dreamer" (空中的夢想家).
