= Regardless (album) =

- Regular digital cover

Studio album by A-Mei
- Released: December 5, 2000
- Recorded: July–October 2000
- Studio: Platinum Studio (Taipei); Forward Studio; A-String Recording Studio; Mega Force Studio (Taipei); Beat Sound Studio (Taipei City); Life Recorder (Taipei); Premium Recording Studio; Form Recording Studio (Singapore); The House Of Shock (Pasadena); Oasis Recording Studios (Los Angeles); A&M Studios (Los Angeles); Music Grinder Studios (Hollywood); Cherokee Studios (Los Angeles); The Town House (West London)
- Genre: Pop; R&B; pop rock
- Length: 47:43
- Label: Forward Music; BMG Hong Kong
- Producer: David Tao; Huang Yi; Chang Yu-sheng; David Wong; Sky Wu; Yuan Wei-jen

A-Mei chronology
Time to Say Goodbye, A-Mei Hong Kong Live (2000)	Regardless (2000)	Journey (2001)

Regardless (Chinese: 不顧一切; pinyin: Bùgù yīqiè) is the seventh studio album by Taiwanese singer A-Mei. It was released on December 5, 2000, through Forward Music and BMG Hong Kong, and was ultimately her final studio album to be released under the label. After a year and a half since her last album Can I Hug You, Lover?, Forward Music created a $10 million alliance of musicians from Taipei, Singapore and Los Angeles to create the album Regardless. The album had the longest pre-production period, the longest production period, the largest amount of money spent, and the largest number of people involved in the production out of any of A-Mei's studio albums to that point. All 10 songs were by well-known music connoisseurs from Greater China, which include David Tao, Huang Yi, David Huang, Sky Wu and Yuan Wei-jen.

The album came only seven months after her banishment from mainland China due to her singing the National Anthem of the Republic of China at the presidential inauguration ceremony of Chen Shui-bian. Commercially, Regardless was a success. The album sold more than 360,000 copies in Taiwan and more than 1 million copies in Asia. Regardless is listed as one of the best-selling albums in Taiwan in the 21st century.

== Background and production ==
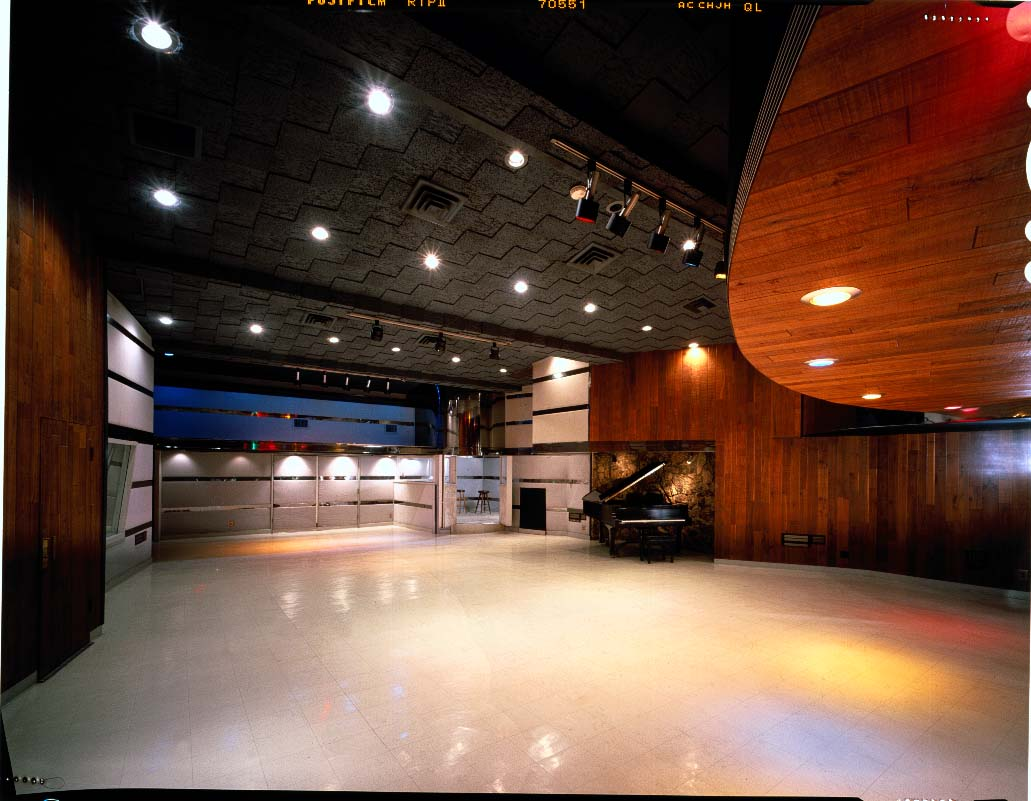
Cherokee Studios (Los Angeles, California) was one of the studios where the album was recorded

On May 20, 2000, A-Mei sang the National Anthem of the Republic of China at the presidential inauguration ceremony of Chen Shui-bian. The performance infuriated the government of the People's Republic of China, who subsequently barred A-Mei from visiting the mainland. Consequently, all of A-Mei's concerts were cancelled in China out of the blue, along with her lucrative advertising contracts. Under pressure from the Chinese government, Sprite also buckled and cut its contract with A-Mei by dropping her as its spokesperson. Meanwhile, top 40 radio stations in China temporarily ceased playing her music and her commercials were pulled from broadcasting. It was also around this time that rumors began to swirl about A-Mei not renewing her contract with her parent company Forward Music.

After the pressure cooker situation, A-Mei dropped out of sight for several months, living in New York and Los Angeles. In order to present the different sensations in the songs, the recording sessions for Regardless were conducted not only in Taipei, but also in Singapore and Los Angeles, where top musicians from all over the world worked slowly and carefully to produce the 10 songs on the album. A-Mei recorded the 10 songs for the album in October 2000 and originally planned to release it in November of that year, but the record market was so bad and the commercial strategy was to avoid piracy, so the release was postponed to December.

== Writing and recording ==
"One Night Stand" is a sultry R&B-soul ballad written by David Tao. "Cinderella" is a mellow pop ballad interpreting fairy tale-like delicate love. The album's title track is an arena rock recorded in September 7, 2000 song written by her late mentor Chang Yu-sheng. "Love Breaks Everyone's Heart" is a guitar-driven ballad. "Wonder Why" is a trip hop song written by Ye Hanhui and David Tao.

"Before It's Too Late" is a synthesizer-heavy ballad. "I Am Amazed" is a dance song with R&B and pop influences. "Racing" is a dance rock. "Last Time" is mellow pop ballad with guitars and strings. "The Other Way" is an upbeat song written by David Tao.

== Release and promotion ==
The album's standard edition comes in a CD with 10 songs packaged in a slipcase; as well as CD, VCD and a promo. The following year, in 2001, Forward Music released a limited edition reissue of the album. In order to promote Regardless, A-Mei held a series of press conferences in Taiwan, Hong Kong, Singapore, and Malaysia.

=== Live performances ===
On the day of the album's release, a concert was held at Nangang District, Taipei. Before the concert began, A-Mei also hosted a cross-country satellite press conference, with Hong Kong, Singapore and Malaysia all linked to the press conference, along with Taiwan. On December 31, 2000, she participated in a New Year's Eve concert in Taipei. Since then, A-Mei had performed songs from the album at various events and concert tours.

=== Singles and music videos ===
The music video for "One Night Stand" was directed by Kuang Sheng; the video was filmed on a rooftop and by a seashore. The video for "Cinderella" was directed by Jinhe Lin; it depicts A-Mei dawdling around an infinity pool while reminiscing about her lover. The music videos for "Regardless" and "Love Breaks Everyone's Heart" were directed by Kuang Sheng. The video for "Before It's Too Late" was directed by Jinhe Lin.

In January 2002, the track "One Night Stand" was listed at number 77 on the 2001 Hit FM Top 100 Singles of the Year chart.

== Accolades ==
The album Regardless earned A-Mei a Golden Melody Award nomination for Best Mandarin Female Singer at the 12th Golden Melody Awards.

== Track listing ==
No.	Title	Lyrics	Music	Arrangement	Length
1.	"一夜情" (One Night Stand)	David Tao	David Tao	David Tao	5:12
2.	"灰姑娘" (Cinderella)	Cheng Hua Jiuan	Cheng Hua Jiuan	Goh Kheng Long	4:33
3.	"不顧一切" (Regardless)	Chang Yu-sheng	Chang Yu-sheng	Koji Sakurai; Chang Yu-sheng	4:26
4.	"讓每個人都心碎" (Love Breaks Everyone's Heart)	Chia-Li Chen	David Huang	Goh Kheng Long	5:11
5.	"純真年代" (Wonder Why)	Ye Hanhui; David Tao	David Tao	David Tao	4:34
6.	"趁早" (Before It's Too Late)	Shiyi Lang	Phil Chang	Martin Tang	5:24
7.	"I Am Amazed"	Chia-Li Chen	Adam Hsu	Chia-Li Chen	4:45
8.	"奔跑" (Racing)	Chien Yao	Sky Wu	Sky Wu	4:12
9.	"最後一次" (Last Time)	Yuan Wei-jen	Yuan Wei-jen	Jiang Jianmin	4:22
10.	"不二法門" (The Other Way)	David Tao	David Tao	David Tao	4:58
Total length:					47:43

== Personnel ==
Song #1

- Edited By [Vocals] – Sarah Chang (2)
- Mixed By [Assistant] – Mauricio "Veto" Iragorri
- Recorded By, Mixed By – Craig Burbidge
- Songwriter, Producer, Arranged By, Instruments, Mixed By, Edited By [Vocals], Backing Vocals – David Tao*

Song #2

- Arranged By [Additional], Piano [Acoustic], Programmed By [Synth] – Jeffery Vanston*
- Engineer [Assistant] – Bryan Cook, Dave Hancock (2)
- Guitar – Michael Thompson
- Mixed By – Bill Drescher
- Producer – Huang Yee*
- Recorded By – Bill Drescher, Dave Shyi*, Chu Xian Ming*

Song #3

- Arranged By, Keyboards, Programmed By – Koji Sakurai (2)
- Guitar – James Ni
- Mixed By – Carlton "Mr. Killer" Wang
- Percussion – Huang Ruifeng
- Recorded By – Zhu Xianming, Xu Caiweng
- Songwriter, Producer, Arranged By, Recorded By – Chang Yu-sheng*

Song #4

- Bass – Leland Sklar
- Drums – Gregg Bissonette
- Engineer [Assistant] – Bryan Cook, Dave Hancock (2)
- Guitar – Michael Thompson
- Mixed By – Bill Drescher
- Piano [Acoustic] – Jeffery Vanston*
- Producer – Huang Yee*
- Recorded By – Bill Drescher, Dave Shyi*, Chu Xian Ming*

Song #5

- Mixed By [Assistant] – Mauricio "Veto" Iragorri
- Recorded By, Mixed By – Craig Burbidge
- Songwriter – Ye Hanhui
- Songwriter, Producer, Arranged By, Instruments, Mixed By, Edited By [Vocals], Backing Vocals – David Tao*

Song #6

- Arranged By, Synthesizer – Martin Tang
- Bass – Leland Sklar
- Drums – Gregg Bissonette
- Engineer [Assistant] – Bryan Cook, Dave Ashton
- Guitar – Michael Thompson
- Mixed By – Bill Drescher
- Producer – Huang Yee*
- Recorded By – Bill Drescher, Frank Lee (17), Dave Shyi*, Chu Xian Ming*

Song #7

- Mixed By – Dave Elvenia
- Recorded By – Kenny Fan, Chu Xian Ming*
- Songwriter, Producer, Arranged By, Instruments, Recorded By, Mixed By – David Huang

Song #8

- Bass – Julian Crampton
- Co-producer, Mixed By – Jeremy Lin*
- Guitar – Tim Cansfield
- Percussion – Ian Thomas
- Recorded By – Wil Donovan
- Songwriter, Producer, Arranged By, Instruments, Backing Vocals, Recorded By, Mixed By – Sky Wu

Song #9

- Arranged By [Strings], Conductor – Li Qi
- Arranged By, Guitar – James "Jimmy" Chiang
- Backing Vocals – Jennifer Huang
- Bass – Liao Shizheng
- Drums – Chen Baizhou
- Mixed By – Huang Qinsheng
- Recorded By – David Shi, Xu Jinglun, Jason "Waveform" Huang, Huang Qinsheng
- Songwriter, Producer – Yuan Weiren

Song #10

- Bass – Reggie Hamilton
- Drums – Abraham Laboriel Jr.
- Edited By [Vocals] – Sarah Chang (2)
- Guitar – Bruce Watson (9)
- Mandolin – Dean Parks
- Mixed By [Assistant] – Mauricio "Veto" Iragorri
- Recorded By, Mixed By – Craig Burbidge
- Saxophone – Dino Soldo
- Songwriter, Producer, Arranged By, Instruments, Mixed By, Edited By [Vocals], Backing Vocals – David Tao*

Chris Gehringer, Gene Grimaldi – mastering engineer
