= Hand in Hand (charity song) =

Multi-artist Taiwanese charity song released in 2003

Promotional single by various artists
- Language: Mandarin
- Released: May 21, 2003
- Genre: Pop
- Length: 7:20
- Label: Azio TV
- Composers: Wang Leehom; David Tao
- Lyricists: Wang Leehom; David Tao; Issac Chen
- Producers: Wang Leehom; David Tao

Music video
- "Hand in Hand" on YouTube

"Hand in Hand" (Chinese: 手牽手; pinyin: Shǒu qiān shǒu) is a charity song performed by 86 artists from Taiwan. The song was written by Wang Leehom, David Tao, and Issac Chen, and produced by Wang and Tao. It was released on May 21, 2003, by Azio TV as a promotional single to raise morale and unity during the SARS outbreak.

== Background and release ==
Severe Acute Respiratory Syndrome (SARS) first emerged in Foshan, Guangdong, China, on November 16, 2002. On March 14, 2003, Taiwan confirmed its first imported SARS case at National Taiwan University Hospital. A major hospital outbreak followed at Heping Hospital in Taipei, which was subsequently sealed off on April 24, 2003. As a result, Taiwan's Government Information Office announced the indefinite postponement of the 14th Golden Melody Awards.

During this crisis, Wang Leehom and David Tao proposed the idea of writing a charity song to unite the nation in fighting SARS. On May 9, 2003, Azio TV, the organizer of the Golden Melody Awards, officially backed the project.

By May 12, 2003, songwriting had begun, and by May 15, 2003 the song was completed. The following day (May 16, 2003), 81 artists gathered at Nankang 101 in Taipei to record the group chorus, later recording solo parts individually. The final master track was completed on May 20, 2003.

The song premiered across major Taiwanese radio stations on May 21, 2003, and the accompanying music video debuted on Azio TV's show Asia Entertainment Center the same day. Promotional CDs were distributed for free beginning May 30, 2003, with approximately 600,000 copies issued.

== Live performances ==
At the 14th Golden Melody Awards, held on August 2, 2003, at the National Taiwan University Sports Center, singers Chyi Chin and Shin Band performed "Hand in Hand", joined by other attending artists for a large-scale live rendition.

== Track listing ==
All lyrics are written by Wang Leehom, David Tao, Issac Chen; all music is composed by Wang Leehom, David Tao.

CD
No.	Title	Length
1.	"Hand in Hand"	3:40
2.	"Hand in Hand" (instrumental)	3:40
Total length:		7:20

VCD
No.	Title	Length
1.	"Data format"
2.	"Hand in Hand" (music video)	3:40
Total length:		3:40

== Performers ==
Listed in order of appearance in the song:

- Tsai Chin
- Wang Leehom
- Valen Hsu
- Stefanie Sun
- Wakin Chau
- Monique Lin
- Sky Wu
- Harlem Yu
- Angelica Lee
- Jeff Chang

- Shunza
- Matilda Tao
- Jacky Wu
- Energy
- B.A.D
- Phil Chang
- Elva Hsiao
- Jolin Tsai
- Jody Chiang
- Julie Su

- Chris Yu
- Power Station
- Stella Chang
- Van Fan
- Jay Chou
- A-Mei
- David Tao
- Vivian Hsu
- Shin Band

- Tension
- Dick and Cowboy
- Julia Peng
- Coco Lee
- Machi
- S.H.E
- Comic Boyz
- Vic Chou
- Ken Chu

== Adaptations ==
=== 2021 version ===
In December 2019, the COVID-19 pandemic broke out in Wuhan, Hubei, China, and rapidly spread across the globe within months. Taiwan initially maintained relative stability through early border screening and closure measures. However, in May 2021, cluster infections emerged in Taipei and New Taipei, causing the outbreak to spread nationwide. On May 19, 2020, the Central Epidemic Command Center (CECC) announced a nationwide Level 3 alert, which had a severe impact on the nation's healthcare system, economy, education, and society.

Issac Chen, chief consultant of the 32nd Golden Melody Awards and one of the organizers of the 2003 SARS-era charity single "Hand in Hand", felt deeply moved by the situation. He contacted the original creators, Wang Leehom and David Tao, proposing a remake of the song, to which both readily agreed. Chen then invited JJ Lin to serve as producer for the new version and brought together 11 nominees for Best Male Mandarin Singer and Best Female Mandarin Singer at that year's Golden Melody Awards to participate in the recording. The lineup included Hebe Tien, Sodagreen vocalist Greeny Wu, James Li, JJ Lin, William Wei, Shi Shi, Soft Lipapa, Wan Fang, Eddie Chen, Tan Weiwei, and Tarcy Su.

The 2021 remake of "Hand in Hand" was released online as a music video on June 5, 2021.

=== Formosan languages version ===
On June 24, 2021, Aetós Studio released an Formosan languages version of "Hand in Hand" on its official YouTube channel. This version featured lead vocals by Tank and Sien Vanessa, joined by the ShenAi Indigenous Kids' Choir, composed of 50 singers representing Taiwan's 16 recognized indigenous groups.

The video received widespread acclaim in Taiwan, garnering nearly one million views. Aetós Studio noted that the project marked its first collaboration with amateur singers from various fan pages, aiming to use music to encourage mutual support during the pandemic and other hardships. About 80 percent of the vocal recordings were completed at home using regular earphones, and the entire video was produced within just 14 days.

On October 10, 2021, the ShenAi Indigenous Kids' Choir was invited to perform the song live at the 110th National Day Celebration of the Republic of China (Taiwan).

== See also ==
- "Tomorrow Will Be Better"
