= Golden Melody Award for Best Vocal Group =

Taiwanese music award

The Golden Melody Award for Best Vocal Group (Chinese: 金曲獎最佳演唱組合獎) is an award given by the Ministry of Culture of Taiwan. It was first presented in 1990.

== Winners and nominees ==
=== Best Vocal Collaboration (1990–2000) ===
Year	Recipient	Nominees	Ref
January 1990	Zhi Ji Er Chong Chang	Fen Hong Pai Dui; Xiao Hu Dui	
October 1990	Orient Express - Connect Your Soul to My Line (將你的靈魂接在我的線路上)	Dai Dai Xiong - Qing Nian Yang Ben (青年樣本); Lily Duet - Ten Years of Lily (十年百合)	
1991	Lily Duet	Heavenly Melody; Orient Express	
1992	South Duet	Fan Ren; Fen Hong Pai Dui	
1993	Fan Ren	Wooden Guitar; South Duet	
1994	Fan Ren - Wo Yuan Shi Ni Zui Wen Rou De Feng (我願是你最溫柔的風)	South Duet - Look into the World (深情看世界); Ukulele - Ocean Deep	
1996	South Duet - Feelings of Fall (秋意上心頭)	Lily Duet - Xin Teng (心疼)	
1997	Kao Hsiang-peng and Fang Yi-ping - Good Luck (福氣啦)	TIB - The Voice Unbeatable (四海小兄弟); Chen Chung and Chiu Yun-tzu - Teng Ni Ru Xin (疼你入心); New Formosa Band - New Formosa Band, Vol. 4 (新寶島康樂隊第樹輯)	
1998	Luan Tan - Hope (希望)	Shan Feng Dian Huo - Hidden (深藏不露); Chin Man-wang & Lee Ping-huei - Odyssey (流浪到淡水); Power Station - Ruthless Love Letter (無情的情書); Michael & Victor - Wu Yin Liang Pin x 2 (無印良品X2)	
1999	South Duet - Sun Falls in Love (太陽戀愛了)	Two Girls - Ready to Fly; Power Station - Tomorrow Never Dies (明天的明天的明天); Walkie Talkie - More Than a Bond of Love Between Sisters (情比姊妹深); Michael & Victor - The Three of Us (三人行)	
2000	Luan Tan - Luan Tan (亂彈)	Tolaku - Welcome Tolaku (歡迎脫拉庫); Quarterback - Up! 393B1 (起來); Mayday - Mayday's First Album (五月天第一張創作專輯); The Flowers - After School (放學啦)	

=== Best Vocal Ensemble (2001-2005) ===
Year	Recipient	Nominees	Ref
2001	Bei Yuan Shan Mao - Mo Li Sha Ka (摩莉莎卡)	Walkie Talkie - Warm (錦繡三溫暖); China Dolls - Girls with Single Eyelids (單眼皮女生); S.B.D.W. - Wanna Fly	
2002	B. A. D. - All I...	Power Station - Walking Along Chunghsiao East Road Nine Times (忠孝東路走九遍); Walkie Talkie - Summer Trip (錦繡羅曼史(二)夏之旅); Gao Shan A Ma - Gao Shan A Ma (高山阿嬤同名專輯)	
2003	S.H.E - Genesis	B. A. D. - Song To My Lovely Queen (皇后之歌); Power Station - Man	
2004	Abao & Brandy - Abao & Brandy	B. A. D. - Beginning of My Dream (夢的起點); Energy - E3; S.H.E - Super Star; Tension - Gotta Be Your Man	
2005	Power Station - All Record (就是紅光輝全紀錄)	Semiscon - Semiscon (神秘失控人聲樂團); S.H.E - Magical Journey; JS - Future (遇見未來); Jeff Huang & Machi - 2nd Opus (第貳樂章)	

=== Best Vocal Collaboration (2006-present) ===
Year	Recipient	Nominees	Ref
2006	Material Girls - Material Girls (拜金小姐)	Awaking - Happiness Download (幸福下載); Nan Quan Mama - Brand New (2號餐); S.H.E - Once Upon a Time; Jeff Huang & Machi - Superman (超人)	
2007	Hao-en and Jiajia - Blue in Love	Nan Quan Mama - Color Palette!; Michelle & Vickie - Princess; New Formosa Band - New Formosa Band, Vol. 6 (新寶島康樂隊第6發)	
2008	Da Mouth - Da Mouth (大嘴巴同名專輯)	Nan Quan Mama - Treasure Map; Soler - X2	
2009	Nanwan Sisters - Nanwan Sisters (南王姐妹花)	Da Mouth - Player (玩咖); Y2J - Live for You (為你而活); NyLas - 'nailes	
2010	Da Xi Men - X (大囍門X專輯)	KatnCandix2 - Short Flight (小飛行); Come On! Bay Bay! - Fearlessness and Tolerance (無所畏懼與寬容); Super Junior-M - Super Girl; Power Station - Spinning (繼續轉動)	
2011	Da Mouth - One Two Three (萬凸3)	KatnCandix2 - Goodbye Prince (再見王子); Y2J - Guardian (守護者); S.H.E - Shero; Tom & Huck - Tom & Huck I (野狼125)	
2012	New Formosa Band - Eight Feet Open (八腳開開)	Bei Yuan Shan Mao - Kuai Le De Zu Ren Chang Ge Ba (快樂的族人唱歌吧); Onetwofree - Soundtrack (自由發揮電影原聲帶); Nanwan Sisters - BaLiwakes	
2013	O-Kai Singers - O-Kai A Cappella	KatnCandix2 - I Am Myself (不被瞭解的怪人); JS - Listen (聽見); Dark White-collar Workers - The Way Home (回家的路); Tom & Huck - Flip-Flop (夾腳鞋)	
2014	Light Engine - Scenery Along the Way (沿途風景)	Vox - Chocolate (朱古力); Ching Yi - Fresh Fish (新鮮魚); Taiwu Children's Ancient Ballads Troupe - To & From the Heart (歌，飛過群山); Power Station - Light (光)	
2015	Murmurshow - Murmurshow	New Formosa Band - New Formosa Band, Vol. 10 (新寶島康樂隊第叔張); MJ116 - Fresh Game; Pia - Ain't Life a Surprise (生活不就是這樣); Gentleman - Imperfect Gentleman (不完美紳士)	
2016	Chang and Lee - Chang and Lee (張三李四)	Cozy Diary - Live a Cozy Life (好好過生活); Sibongie - Those Things Africans Taught Me (那些非洲人教我的事); Nine One One - 9453 (玖肆伍叁)	
2017	Mr. Miss - Mr. Miss (先生小姐)	Guess What - One; Power Station - Power Station 20th (20新歌duet精選雙CD); Astro Bunny - Loneliness Will Be Over, Away, and Gone (孤單會消失離開不見); Grasshopper - Music Walker (音悅行者); Radio Mars - Radio Mars (火星電台)	
2018	MJ116 - Big Thing (幹大事)	Yeemao - OwO (健康歌曲); Astro Bunny - Loneliness, Sadness and a Thank You (謝謝你曾經讓我悲傷); Crispy - In Search of Happiness (你快樂，嗎); Chang and Lee - Chang and Lee (張三李四)	
2019	The Chairs - Lovely Sunday	I'm Not OK – Vast & Hazy; Some People Say – O-Kai Singers; HighCC – HighCC; Jump – MJ116	
