= Golden Melody Award for Best Mandarin Female Singer =

Taiwanese music award

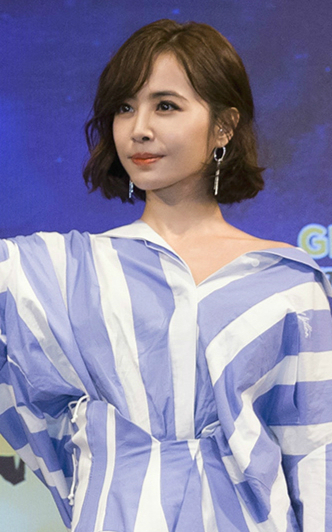
- Jolin Tsai is the most recent recipient.
- Awarded for: Best female Mandopop singer of the year
- Country: Taiwan
- Presented by: Ministry of Culture
- First award: 1991
- Currently held by: Jolin Tsai – Pleasure (2026)

Highlights
- Most wins: Tanya Chua (4)
- Most nominations: A-Mei (14)
- Website: gma.tavis.tw

The Golden Melody Award for Best Mandarin Female Singer (Chinese: 金曲獎最佳華語女歌手獎) is a Golden Melody Award recognizing outstanding vocal performance by a female in the Mandopop category, the first of which was presented in 1991.

In 1990 an award called Best Female Singer was designed to honor all female solo performances in the pop category; in 1991 the award was separated into Best Mandarin Female Singer, Best Taiwanese Female Singer, Best Hakka Female Singer, and Best Aboriginal Female Singer.

The award has been won by Tanya Chua the most times, with four wins. A-Mei is the artist with the most nominations with fourteen.

== Recipients ==
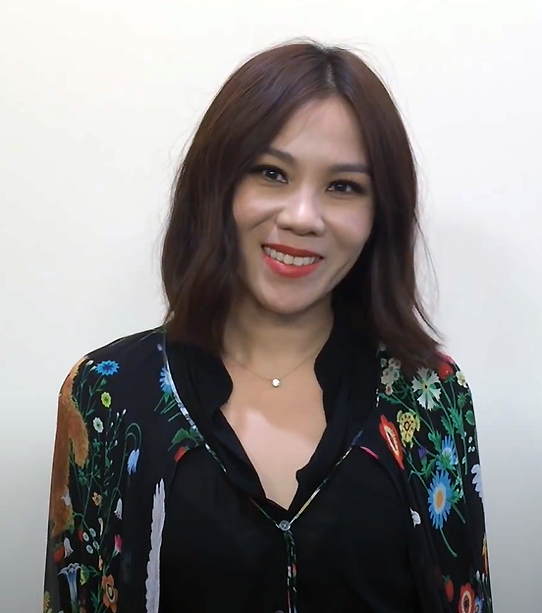
Ten-time nominee Tanya Chua holds the most wins in this category with four awards

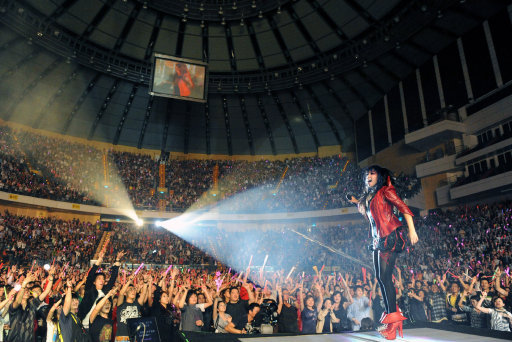
Fourteen-time nominee received the most nominations in this category, including three-time award winner A-Mei

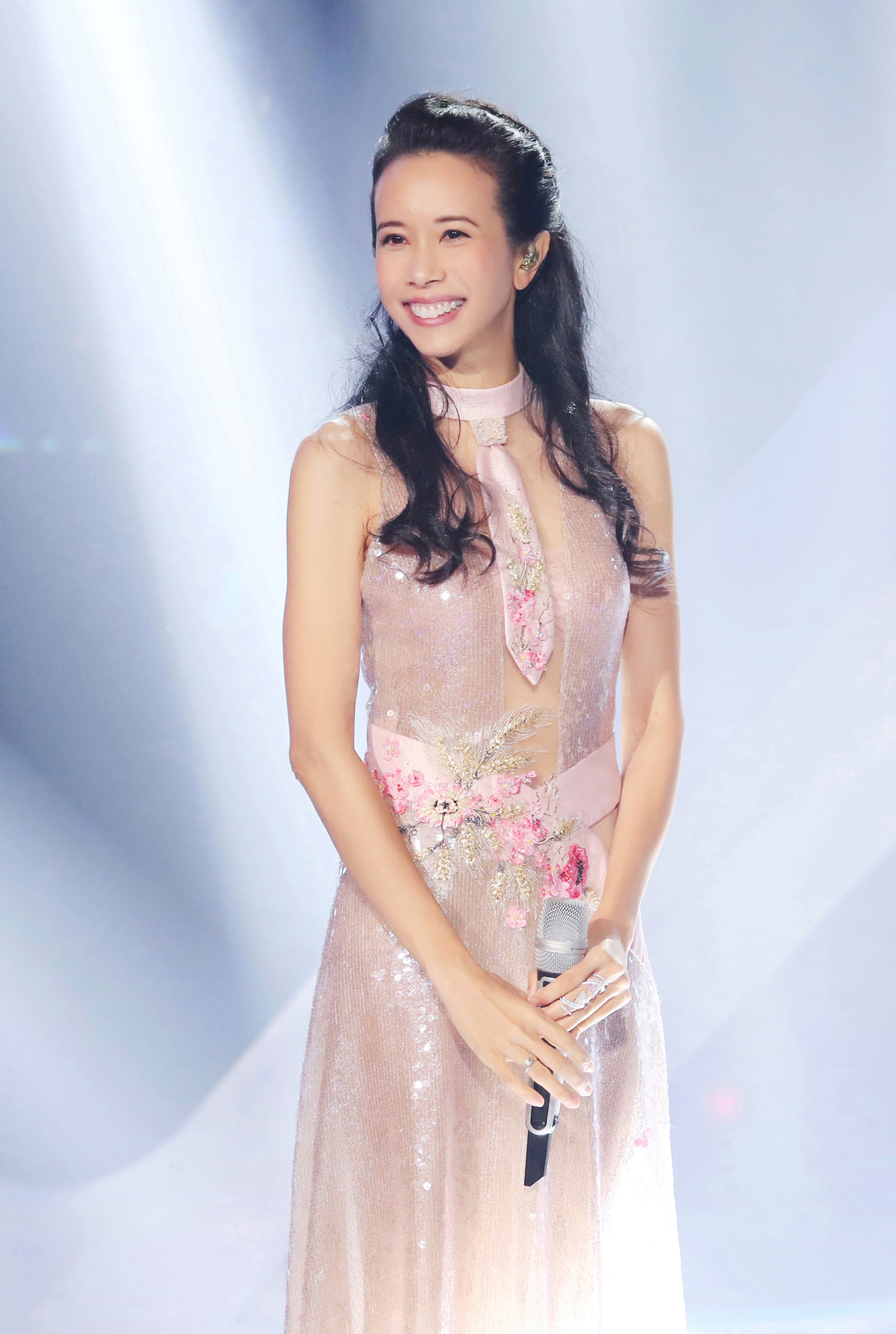
Seven-time nominee, including two-time award winner Karen Mok

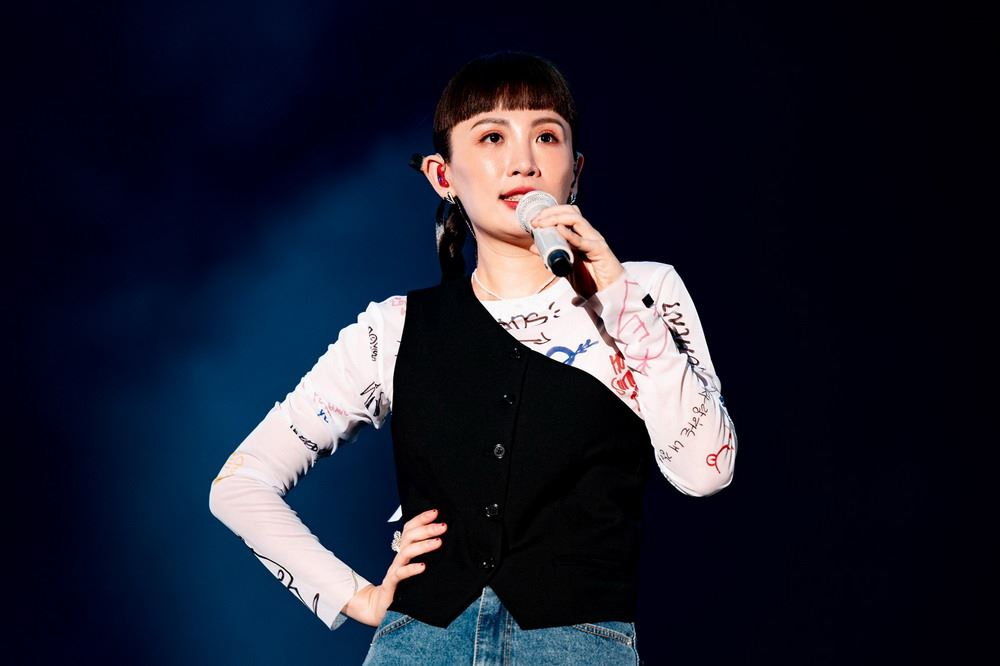
Six-time nominee, including two-time award winner Waa Wei

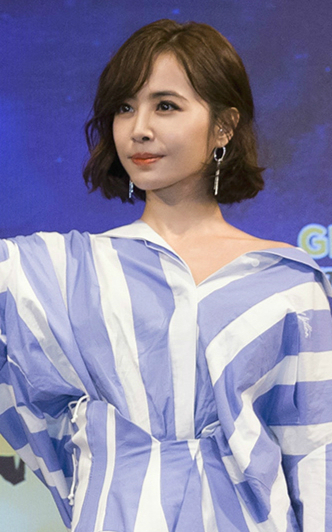
Five-time nominee, including two-time award winner Jolin Tsai

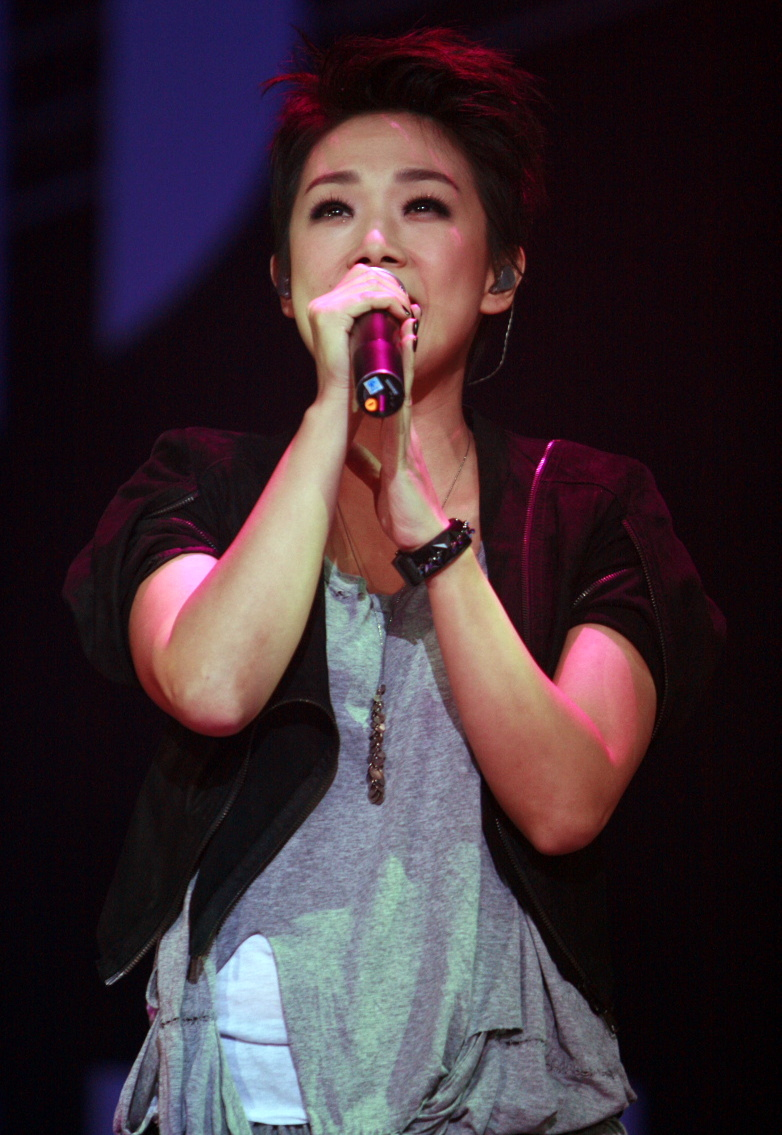
Four-time nominee, including two-time award winner Sandy Lam

=== Best Female Singer (1990–1991) ===
Year	Recipient	Nominees	Ref.
January 1990	Jody Chiang	Chang Ching-fang; Yeh Ai-ling; Tsai Hsing-chuan; Yvonne Cheng	
October 1990	Tsai Chin - About Hearts (談心)	Chen Hsiao-yun - There's Always a Chance to Become the President (做總統有機會); Sarah Chen - Talk to You, Listen to You (跟你說，聽你說); Stella Chang - The Purple Heart (紫色的聲音); Michelle Pan - You Love Me Most of All (我是不是你最疼愛的人)	

=== Best Mandarin Female Singer (1991–present) ===
==== 1990s ====
Year	Winner(s)	Work	Nominees	Ref.
1991	Sarah Chen		Chiang Nien-ting; Kao Chin Su-mei; Sammi Kao; Delphine Tsai	
1992	Sammi Kao		Shelly Yu; Anna Lin; Hung Hsiao-chiao; Christine Hsu	
1993	Sally Yeh		Lily Lee; Stella Chang; Michelle Pan; Su Rui	
1994	Stella Chang	Indecisive	Kung Lan-hsun – Chang'e; Sally Yeh – The Days When I Was Away from My Lover; Tsai Chin – Tragedy of Loving You; Tang Na – Hold Tighter	
1996	Sarah Chen	Forever	Faye Wong – Sky; Sally Yeh – Wishes...; Tsai Chin – Light Up the Neon Lights; Stella Chang – In the Rainy Night	
1997	Stella Chang	Purity	Winnie Hsin – It's Not All My Fault to Love Him; Valen Hsu – If Cloud Knows; Christine Hsu – Fragrance; Tang Na – Freedom	
1998	Chyi Yu	Camel, Flying Bird, Fish	A-Mei – Bad Boy; Shunza – Shunza; Christine Hsu – Pure Christine; Coco Lee – Each Time I Think of You	
1999	Shunza	I Am Not a Star	Faye Wong – Sing and Play; Na Ying – Conquer; Winnie Hsin – Every Woman; A-Mei – Holding Hands	

==== 2000s ====
Year	Winner(s)	Work	Nominees	Ref.
2000	Faith Yang	Silence	Faye Wong – Lovers & Strangers; Mavis Fan – I Want Us to Be Together; A-Mei – Can I Hug You, Lover?; Karen Mok – You Can	
2001	Na Ying	Sad Romance	Faye Wong – Fable; Karen Mok – Karen Mok on the Twelfth Floor; A-Mei – Regardless; Stefanie Sun – My Desired Happiness	
2002	A-Mei	Truth	Shunza – And Music's There; Sandy Lam – Truly...; Tanya Chua – I Do Believe; Stefanie Sun – Kite; Winnie Hsin – Forever	
2003	Karen Mok	I	A-Mei – Fever; Na Ying – Nowadays...; Shunza – Dear Shunza; Valen Hsu – Rue Blossom; Stella Chang – Waiting for Fang to Sing	
2004	Faye Wong	To Love	Penny Tai – No Pain, No Gain; Tanya Chua – Stranger; Fish Leong – Beautiful; Jolin Tsai – Magic	
2005	Stefanie Sun	Stefanie	Sandee Chan – Then We All Wept in Silence; Angela Chang – Aurora; A-Mei – Maybe Tomorrow; Fish Leong – Wings of Love	
2006	Tanya Chua	Amphibian	Fengie Wang – Only Want You to Be Happy; Fish Leong – Silkroad of Love; Cheer Chen – Peripeteia; Penny Tai – Crazy Love; Stefanie Sun – A Perfect Day; FanFan – One to One	
2007	Jolin Tsai	Dancing Diva	Angela Chang – Pandora; Jyotsna Pang – All I Want; A-Mei – I Want Happiness?; Penny Tai – IPenny; Sandy Lam – Breathe Me	
2008	Tanya Chua	Goodbye & Hello	A-Mei – Star; Stefanie Sun – Against the Light; Fish Leong – J'Adore; Karen Mok – L!ve Is...; Joi Chua – Blessed	
2009	Sandee Chan	What If It Matters	Tsai Chin – No Regret; Fish Leong – Today Is Our Valentine's Day; A-Lin – A Born Diva; Tanya Chua – My Space	

==== 2010s ====
Year	Winner(s)	Work	Nominees	Ref.
2010	A-Mei	Amit	Tanya Chua – If You Meet Him; Karen Mok – Hui Wei; Deserts Chang – A City; Tiger Huang – Simple or Not; Cheer Chen – Immortal	
2011	Karen Mok	Precious	Denise Ho – Nameless Poem; A-Lin – Loneliness Is Not the Hardest Part; Wanfang – Let's Not Grieve Anymore; Freya Lim – Holding Back the Tears	
2012	Tanya Chua	Sing It Out of Love	A-Lin – We Will Be Better; Stefanie Sun – It's Time; Hebe Tien – My Love; Waa Wei – No Crying; A-Mei – R U Watching?	
2013	Sandy Lam	Gaia	Ellen Joyce Loo – You Quietly Hide Away; G.E.M. – Xposed; Jia Jia – Unforgettable; Lala Hsu – Ideal Life; Jolin Tsai – Muse	
2014	Penny Tai	Unexpected	Faith Yang – Zero; Denise Ho – Coexistence; Tanya Chua – Angel vs. Devil; Jia Jia – Alone the Way	
2015	A-Mei	Faces of Paranoia	Lala Hsu – Missing; Waa Wei – You Lovely Bastard; Karen Mok – Departures; A-Lin – Guilt	
2016	Julia Peng	Darling	Peggy Hsu – Swing Inc.; Huang Qishan – Xiao Xia; Su Yunying – Min Ming; A-Mei – Amit 2; Tanya Chua – Aphasia	
2017	Eve Ai	Talk About Eve	Jia Jia – Still Missing; Waa Wei – Run! Frantic Flowers!; Ellen Joyce Loo – Imperfections; Faith Yang – Centrifugal Force; Miss Ko – Queen of Queens	
2018	Lala Hsu	The Inner Me	Amuyi – O_Love; Faye – Little Outerspace; A-Mei – Story Thief; Julia Peng – When I Look Back	
2019	Sandy Lam	0	Eve Ai – Fade to Exist; Sun Sheng Xi – Shi's Journey; Yoyo Sham – Nothing Is Under Control; Jolin Tsai – Ugly Beauty	

==== 2020s ====
Year	Winner(s)	Work	Nominees	Ref.
2020	Waa Wei	Hidden, Not Forgotten	Joanna Wang – Love is Calling Me; Fish Leong – The Sun Also Rises; G.E.M. – City Zoo; Peggy Hsu – Hypnocity; Faith Yang - The More Beautiful, The More Invisible	
2021	Hebe Tien	Time Will Tell	Wanfang – Dear All; Panai Kusui – Love, And Yet; Sun Sheng Xi – Where is SHI?; Tarcy Su – Every Side of Me; Tan Weiwei – 3811	
2022	Tanya Chua	Depart	Karencici – 99% Angel; Faye – Zai Yun Cai Shang Tiao Wu Ji Ji Zha Zha; Ilid Kaolo – Longing; Waa Wei – Have a Nice Day; Tia Ray – Once Upon a Moon	
2023	A-Lin	Link	Lala Hsu – Gei; Hong Pei-yu – Silver Lining; Yisa Yu – Dear Life; Penny Tai – The Passive Audience; Lexie Liu – The Happy Star	
2024	Sun Sheng Xi	Boomerang	Tia Ray – Allure; Faith Yang – Flow; 9m88 – Sent; Su Yunying – Circle	
2025	Waa Wei	Ordeal by Pearls	Tanya Chua – Imperfect Us; Penny Tai – Twin Flame; Vicky Chen – V; Karencici – Made for You	
2026	Jolin Tsai	Pleasure	Hong Pei-yu – Still Moving; Chen Hsien-ching – If Every Day Could Be Happy Happy, Who Would Want Sad; Julia Peng – Incompletely Fully Grown; Erika Liu – Pisces Palace; Shan Yichun – Lil Sis	

== Category facts ==
Most Wins in Category

Rank	1st	2nd	3rd
Artist	Tanya Chua	A-Mei	Sarah Chen; Stella Chang; Karen Mok; Sandy Lam; Waa Wei; Jolin Tsai
Total wins	4 wins	3 wins	2 wins

Most nominations

Rank	1st	2nd	3rd	4th	5th	6th
Artist	A-Mei	Tanya Chua	Stella Chang; Karen Mok	Stefanie Sun; Fish Leong; Penny Tai; Waa Wei	Faye Wong; A-Lin; Faith Yang; Jolin Tsai	Shunza; Sandy Lam
Total nominations	14 nominations	11 nominations	7 nominations	6 nominations	5 nominations	4 nominations

Other facts

- A-Mei is the only artist to receive the six consecutive nominations in this category and she won for Truth among them.

== See also ==
- List of music awards honoring women
