= Penny Tai discography =

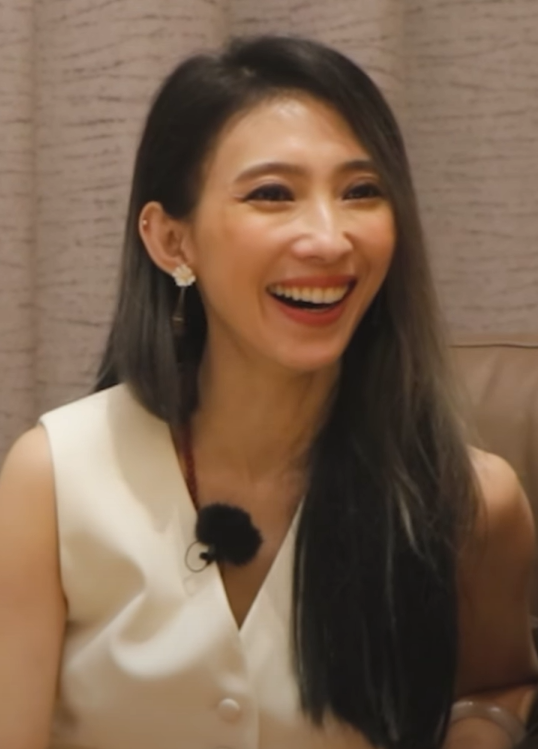
- Tai in 2024
- Studio albums: 11
- Live albums: 2
- Compilation albums: 1

The discography of Malaysian singer and songwriter Penny Tai (Chinese: 戴佩妮) consists of eleven studio albums, one compilation album, and two live albums. Tai released her debut studio album, Penny, in February 2000 under Enjoy Records in Taiwan. Her sophomore record, How's That? (2001), spawned the hit single "The Love You Want" (你要的愛), which was later used as the ending theme for the Taiwanese television series Meteor Garden (2001).

== Studio albums ==
Title	Album details	Peak chart positions		Sales
Title	Album details	SGP	TWN	Sales
Penny	Released: February 25, 2000; Label: Enjoy Records; Formats: CD, cassette, digital download	—	—	Asia: 550,000; TWN: 80,000
How's That? (怎樣)	Released: January 18, 2001; Label: Enjoy Records; Formats: CD, cassette, digital download	—	—	Asia: 800,000; TWN: 150,000
Just Sing It	Released: April 4, 2002; Label: Enjoy Records; Formats: CD, cassette, digital download	10	—	Asia: 800,000; TWN: 150,000
No Penny, No Gain	Released: March 16, 2003; Label: Enjoy Records; Formats: CD, cassette, digital download	—	—	Asia: 600,000; TWN: 100,000
Crazy Love (愛瘋了)	Released: March 13, 2005; Label: Enjoy Records; Formats: CD, cassette, digital download	6	—	Asia: 700,000; TWN: 100,000
iPenny	Released: September 25, 2006; Label: Enjoy Records; Formats: CD+DVD, cassette, digital download	—	2	Asia: 600,000; TWN: 80,000
Forgive Me For Being The Girl I Am (原諒我就是這樣的女生)	Released: May 16, 2009; Label: Enjoy Records; Formats: CD+DVD, digital download	—	2	Asia: 500,000; TWN: 50,000
On the Way Home (回家路上)	Released: November 1, 2011; Label: Seed Music; Formats: CD, digital download	—	1	TWN: 30,000
Unexpected (純屬意外)	Released: May 21, 2013; Label: NeverFall Inc. Taiwan; Formats: CD, digital download	—	9	
Thief (賊)	Released: August 13, 2016; Label: NeverFall Inc. Taiwan; Formats: CD, digital download	—	—	
The Passive Audience (被動的觀眾)	Released: June 29, 2022; Label: NeverFall Inc. Taiwan; Formats: CD, digital download, LP	—	—	

== Compilation albums ==
Title	Album details	Peak chart positions
Title	Album details	SGP
So Penny (好佩妮)	Released: February 6, 2004; Label: Enjoy Records; Formats: CD, cassette, digital download	4

== Live albums ==
Title	Album details
Crazy Concert	Released: August 12, 2005; Label: Enjoy Records; Formats: DVD
Wild Rose 2009 Live Concert	Released: September 16, 2010; Label: Enjoy Records; Formats: 2CD+DVD

== Singles ==
Title	Year	Label
"Blow Beep"	2007	Enjoy Records
"In One Thought"	2008	Enjoy Records
"Lafite"	2008	Enjoy Records
"I Guess it Doesn’t Matter"	2008	Enjoy Records
"This is Me"	2008	Enjoy Records
"See and Hear"	2008	Enjoy Records
"Be Somebody"	2008	Enjoy Records
"Dilemma"	2008	Enjoy Records
"The Love You Want" (Late Night version)	2018	Sony Music Entertainment
"The Love You Want" (Animated version)	2019	Sony Music Entertainment

== Songwriting credits ==
Year	Song	Credits	Artist
1998	"Breathable"	Lyrics, composition	Valen Hsu
1999	"Lonely Night"	Lyrics, composition	Miriam Yeung
2000	"Like a Shadow"	Lyrics, composition	Maggie Chiang
2003	"Transparent Rose"	Lyrics, composition	Angelica Lee
2003	"Powerless"	Lyrics, composition	Adu
2004	"Pretend"	Lyrics, composition	Gigi Leung
2006	"My Him", "Difficult to Live With"	Lyrics, composition	Maggie Chiang
2006	"Trap"	Lyrics, composition	Zhang Xianzi
2008	"It's Okay Not to Love Anymore"	Lyrics, composition	Wen Yin Liang
2008	"Half Baked"	Lyrics, vocals	Victor Wong featuring Penny Tai
2011	"LP"	Lyrics, vocals	Linda Liao featuring Penny Tai
2011	"Lost"	Lyrics, composition	Mini Tsai
2011	"Imperative"	Lyrics, composition	Chen Shian + Bii
2012	"Silence", "End"	Lyrics, composition	Fu Qiongyin
2013	"Silent Protest"	Lyrics, composition	Huang Meizhen
2013	"It Must Be You"	Lyrics, composition	Chen Shian
2013	"Hug You", "Lucky One", "Secret Hint", "Place a Bet", "Loving"	Lyrics, composition	Liu Sihan
2013	"Stereo"	Composition	Liu Sihan
2013	"As Long as I'm Happy"	Lyrics, composition, vocals	Liu Sihan featuring Penny Tai
2014	"Hole in the Brain"	Lyrics, composition	Guan Qing
2014	"Love Rival"	Lyrics, composition, vocals	Da Zhi featuring Penny Tai
2014	"Wolf"	Lyrics, composition, director	Deng Yangtian
2014	"One More Step"	Lyrics, composition	Fu Youxuan
2014	"Little People's Big Wish"	Lyrics, composition	Pets Tsengi
2015	"Little Stars"	Composition	Wu Sixian
2015	"I Deserve to Be Happy"	Lyrics, composition	Lai Songfeng
2015	"OVER"	Lyrics, composition	Fuying & Sam
2017	"Triangle Question"	Lyrics, composition	Tuesday Ke
2017	"Like Me"	Composition	Lin Caixin
2017	"Afternoon Cafe"	Composition	Wu Shenmei
2018	"Intriguing"	Lyrics, composition	Qiu Shiling
2018	"Look At Me Now"	Composition	Dewi Chien
2019	"I Like It Very Much"	Composition	Liu Yuning
2019	"Shield"	Lyrics	Guo Xiuyu
2020	"Don't Want to See Me Again"	Lyrics, composition, production	Greg Hsu
2021	"Tell the Truth"	Lyrics, composition	Julia Peng
2022	"Stars on the Ceiling"	Lyrics, composition	Yu Ziyun
2022	"The Easily Hedgehog"	Lyrics, composition, production	Fu Jing
2023	"I Love My Gaffe"	Composition	Chen You
2023	"The King of Surprises"	Composition	Wu Bin
2023	"Fallen"	Lyrics, composition	Faith Yang featuring Buddha Jump
2023	"Wish Me"	Lyrics, composition	Carole Lin
