= Fever (A-Mei album) =

Studio album by A-Mei
- Released: August 30, 2002
- Recorded: 2002
- Genre: Pop
- Length: 44:43
- Label: Warner Music
- Producer: Martin Tang; Ma Yu-fen; Anthony Bao; Eric Chen; Xu Guangyi

A-Mei chronology
Truth (2001)	Fever (2002)	Brave (2003)

Singles from Fever
- 1. "Cruelty" Released: July 29, 2002

Fever is the tenth studio album by Taiwanese singer A-Mei. It was released on August 30, 2002, by Warner Music Taiwan. It was released two weeks after its intended release date to feature the song "Katsu," which is A-Mei's aboriginal nickname and also means “victory” in Japanese. With this song, A-Mei expresses how a little girl left her aboriginal home and went on a journey into the unknown, and that little girl has become her present self. Fever features a total of 10 songs and is produced by Tino Bao, Ma Yu-Fen and others. The album itself incorporates genres such as pop, country pop, pop rock, funk, hip-hop and R&B.

The album sold more than 2 million copies in Asia. In Taiwan it sold over 180,000 copies, ranking in the top 20 in the year's album sales in the country. The album earned A-Mei two Golden Melody Award nominations for Best Mandarin Female Singer and Album of the Year at the 14th Golden Melody Awards. A-Mei promoted Fever by embarking on the A-Class Entertainment World Tour on August 3, 2002, which attracted about 500,000 people in the whole process.

== Background and development ==
On October 29, 2001, A-Mei released her ninth studio album Truth, which was her first album to be released under Warner Music Taiwan. The album was a commercial success, selling over 1.6 million copies in Asia and over 200,000 copies in Taiwan. It also helped her win the first Golden Melody Award of her career at the 13th annual ceremony. After the promotional activities for Truth had ended she commenced work on its follow up.

In terms of production, the album Fever adopts the elimination method of recording 13 songs and receiving 10. The whole album was written by a team of producers including Tino Bao and Ma Yu-Fen, arranger Baby Chung and guitarist Huang Zhongyue. Among them, Baby Chung turned down other jobs for the album and stayed in the recording studio every day. In order to add a touch of verve to the album's style while continuing the fast track route, Chung also added a thirty-piece string section to all the album's fast songs. In addition, Shunza and Tanya Chua also customized the songs for A-Mei.

The album was delayed two weeks from the scheduled release date because during the time of release, she came across a song called “Katsu”, which A-Mei was touched by hearing it and decided to include the song. After communicating with the lyricist, the final version was produced. In addition, A-Mei's mother also participated in the recording of the song, and the production team recorded her mother's words for A-Mei.

== Writing and recording ==
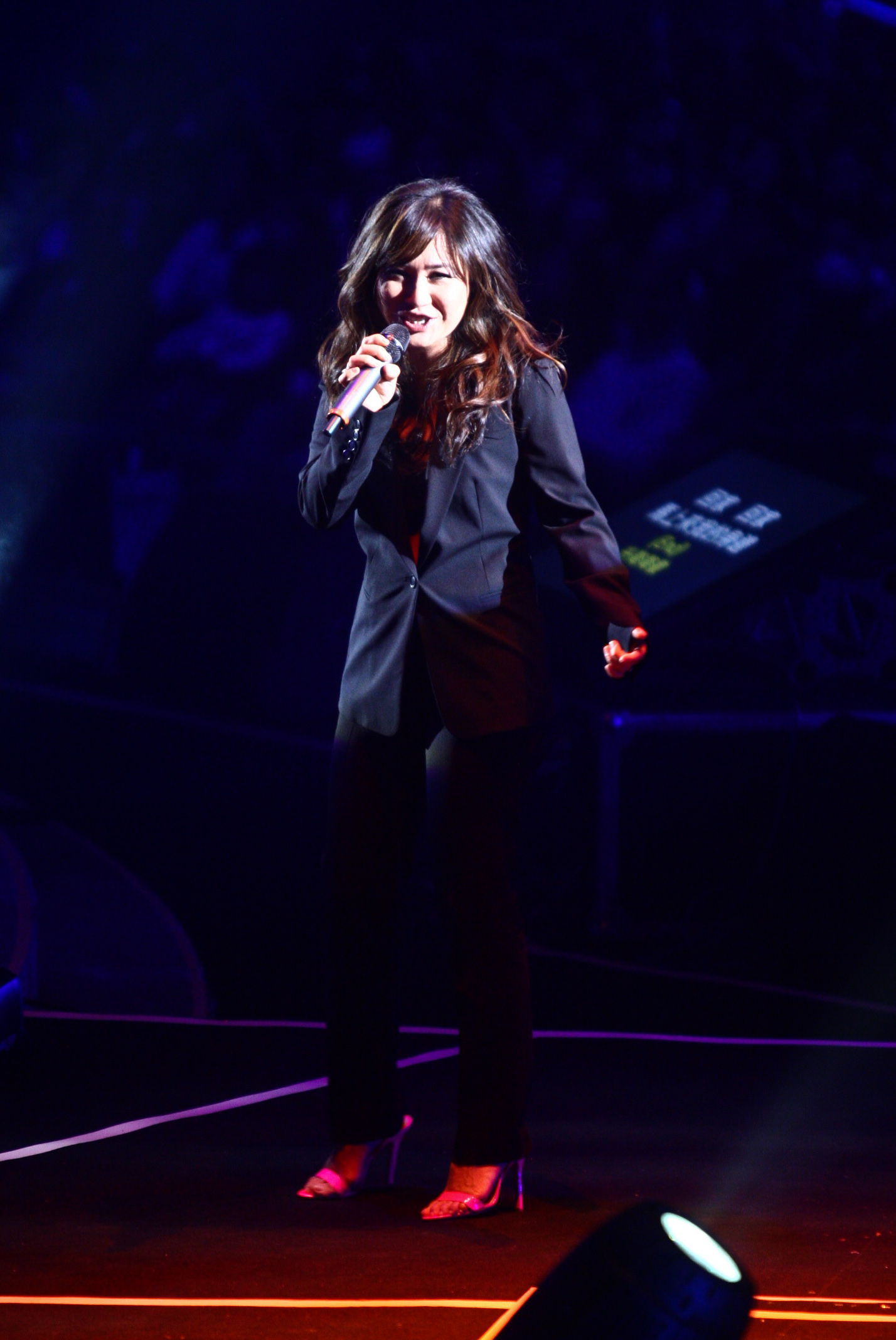
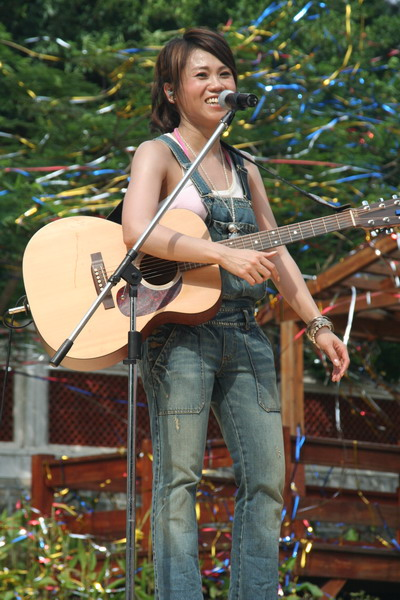
Shunza (left) and Tanya Chua (right) both wrote songs for A-Mei on the album

The album Fever, as evident from its title, is a return to A-Mei's fiery musical tone after the tranquility and serenity of her previous album Truth. In addition to maintaining her production standards, A-Mei returns to her honesty and spontaneity, with a sense of growth and realization as a woman.

The title track of the album is an R&B number. "Cruelty" is a fast-paced country pop song. "Understanding" is a passionate power ballad. "The Next Person" is a medium-tempo song. "54321" is a song with slithering up-tempo R&B edge written by Jennifer Hsu and composed by Khalil Fong.

"Together With My Crazy" is a pop rock song. "Don't Disturb His Heart" is a sad emotional song like "Listen to the Sea". A-Mei uses a slightly hoarse singing voice to describe a woman who can't extricate herself from memories but is considerate and caring about the other person. "Hear Me" is a pop ballad. "Yes or No" is a fast-paced dance pop number. "Katsu" is a dramatic ballad. At the same time, Katsu is also A-Mei’s nickname, and it also means "victory" in Japanese.

== Release and promotion ==
The album was originally scheduled for release on August 16, 2002, but was abruptly delayed to August 30, 2002. The reason for postponement was reportedly due to A-Mei being in an eager mood to make it better. This decision angered her fans, who called the record company to protest; even the Warner website was paralyzed. Around the album's release date, A-Mei appeared as a special guest on Woo Gwa's variety show. On August 24, 2002, A-Mei attended the press conference to promote her new album Fever in Taipei. Right before the album's release Fever had already seen pirated copies in some cities in the mainland, with pirates even publishing fake news about the album's early release on the Internet and in some local tabloids to mislead consumers. On August 28, 2002, Warner Music and Beijing Music had sent marketing personnel to major markets to cooperate with local authorities in cracking down on piracy, and to assist legitimate distributors in preparing sufficient stock and strengthening publicity in preparation for the album's simultaneous release on August 30. The album's first batch of 120,000 copies were sold out within five days of its release, and the demand for goods continued to soar past the 150,000 mark.

=== Singles and music videos ===
The music video for Fever was directed by Lai Weikang. The music video for "Cruelty" was directed by Kuang Sheng, which revolves around A-Mei and her backup dancers dancing in the grassland. The music video for "Understanding" was directed by Jin Zhuo; it tells the story of a young couple in love, the man's MS no longer loves the woman, so the woman pretends to commit suicide to see the man's reaction. She then commits suicide in the end. The music video for "The Next Person" was directed by Jong-jong Yu and Richard Mai. The music video for "Don' t Disturb His Heart" was directed by Jong-jong Yu and Mark@Alpha Post. The music video for "Hear Me" was directed by Jong-jong Yu. The music video for "Yes or No" was directed by Xu Renfeng and tells the story of A-Mei escaping from being kidnapped. The music video for "Katsu" was directed by Xie Pinghan. A-Mei's mother and her little niece Zhang Qing, who looks very similar to A-Mei, also appeared in the video.

In January 2003, the songs "Cruelty" and "Understanding" were listed at number 40 and number 80 respectively on the 2002 Hit FM Top 100 Singles of the Year chart.

== Accolades ==
In 2002, Fever was placed on the "Top Ten Albums Award" leaderboard at the Chinese Pop Music Media Awards. On November 22, 2002, "Yes or No" was nominated for the Most Popular Music Video Award and the Most Popular Song Award at the 9th Channel V Chinese Music Chart. At the 14th Golden Melody Awards in 2003 A-Mei was nominated for Best Mandarin Female Singer while Fever was nominated for Album of the Year.

== Track listing ==
No.	Title	Lyrics	Music	Arrangement	Length
1.	"發燒" (Fever)	Matthew Yen; Jennifer Hsu	Chen Keyu	Martin Tang	5:14
2.	"狠角色" (Cruelty)	Kevin Yi	Martin Tang	Martin Tang	3:43
3.	"知道" (Understanding)	Eric Lin	Michael Tu	Michael Tu	4:36
4.	"下一個人" (The Next Person)	Yu-Kang Wu	Lin Lizhen	Anthony Bao; Huang Zhongyue	5:12
5.	"54321"	Jennifer Hsu	Khalil Fong	Goh Kheng Long	3:46
6.	"跟我一起瘋" (Together With My Crazy)	Jennifer Hsu	Andrew Chen	Huang Zhongyue	3:49
7.	"別去打擾他的心" (Don't Disturb His Heart)	Tanya Chua; David Ke	Tanya Chua	Baby Chung	4:15
8.	"聽見了嗎" (Hear Me)	Kevin Yi	Shunza	Tu Ying	4:29
9.	"Yes Or No"	Francis Lee	Paul Lee	Martin Tang	3:28
10.	"Katsu"	Kevin Yi	Xu Guangyi	Eric Hung	6:03
Total length:					44:43
