= Maybe Tomorrow (A-Mei album) =

Studio album by A-Mei
- Released: September 21, 2004
- Recorded: 2004
- Studios: Platinum Studio (Taipei); Martians Studio
- Genres: Pop; pop rock
- Length: 55:10
- Label: Warner Music
- Producers: A-Mei; Xu Guangyi; Wang Leehom; Wang Meilian

A-Mei chronology
Brave (2003)	Maybe Tomorrow (2004)	I Want Happiness? (2006)

Maybe Tomorrow (Chinese: 也許明天; pinyin: Yěxǔ Míngtiān) is the twelfth studio album by Taiwanese singer A-Mei. It was released on September 21, 2004, by Warner Music Taiwan. Maybe Tomorrow comes hard on the heels of cross-straits controversies from earlier in the year, which led to some of her concerts having to be canceled due to the high amount of tension developed between the political figures on both sides. The album's music style presents a more daring and avant-garde experimental rock, and A-Mei is involved in the production for the first time, as well as contributing a number of lyrics and compositions.

Maybe Tomorrow received mixed responses from music critics, with some claiming that the album had a lack of depth. Commercially, the album failed to match the commercial success of its predecessors and struggled in the music charts. The album sold 80,000 copies in Taiwan, which is considerably lower than her past releases. It was also A-Mei's first album not to rank in the top 20 of Taiwan's year-end album sales chart. After the album's underperformance, A-Mei decided to take a year-long leave from the music industry to study abroad in Boston University.

== Background and development ==
Several months before the release of Maybe Tomorrow, A-Mei found herself in the forefront of political pressure cooker situations. She was forced to abruptly cancel a concert in Hangzhou in June after students from Zhejiang University accused her of being a "supporter of Taiwanese independence." Back home, she was under fire from individuals who championed Taiwanese pride, including the then-Vice President of the Republic of China, Annette Lu. She held a concert in Beijing on July 31, 2004, to a 10,000 strong audience; A-Mei confessed that she had never felt such great pressure at a concert before when fans begged her not to be disturbed by the raucous protesters. Undeterred by the negativity, she continued work on her upcoming twelfth album, Maybe Tomorrow. A-Mei herself served as the producer of the album, and also invited Singaporean arranger Martin Tang to complete the arrangement of the entire album.

== Writing and composition ==
The album is rock-oriented, attempting to bring A-Mei's best rock styles and sisterly love songs to the forefront, utilizing easy-to-sing songs to communicate directly with the audience at the initial stage. Other deeper songs are rewritten to have more depth. A-Mei wrote the two songs "Love Is the Only Way" and "Crucial Moment" on the album.

"Love Is the Only Way" is a pop rock song written by Shih Li. The album also specially includes the demo version of "Love is the Only Way" originally created by A-Mei. The retro funk song "Fire" was tailored for A-Mei by her good friend at the time Wang Leehom. "What Happened" is an upbeat chamber pop song written by A-Mei herself along with Xu Guangyi, Shih Li and Jonathan Koh; Jonathan Koh also composed it. "Are You Well?" is a power ballad written by Hu Ruhong and composed by Dreamz FM. "Crucial Moment" is an indie rock song written by Shih Li. The album's title track is a synthesizer-heavy pop ballad written by Shih Li and composed by Martin Tang.

"Love High Heels" is a country-influenced song written by Shi Li and composed by Xu Guangyi. "Love Song Of Nalu Bay" is a hard rock track written and composed by Charles Tso. "Can't Make It Through" is a piano-driven ballad written by Kate Liao and composed by Wu Guanyan and Yi Jet Qi. "Who Is Fighting?" was written by Shih Li and composed by Martin Tang; it is musically a pop rock and synthpop-inspired number. Xu Guangyi and Wang Meilian wrote and composed the song "High Spirits," which takes influences from Indian pop music. "Charming" is a sunshine pop song written by Tian Tian and composed by Martin Tang.

== Title and artwork ==
The album was A-Mei's first release after the "boycott storm," and she took the opportunity to express her feelings at the time, which is why the album was titled Maybe Tomorrow. The cover art portrays her sitting down with a guitar in her arms.

== Release and promotion ==
On August 31, 2004, it was reported that the album would be released on September 17 of the same year. The song "Love Is Only Way" was also broadcast on some radio stations in mainland China on the same day. A-Mei was originally supposed to hold a performance in Luzhou on September 29, 2004, but it was cancelled due to a poor box office performance. On October 5, 2004, A-Mei participated in Variety Big Brother and played the saxophone on the spot. The album's lead single "Fire" was accused by netizens and radio DJ's of plagiarizing No Doubt's "Hella Good" and N*E*R*D's "She Wants to Move"; Wang Leehom responded to these allegations by stating: "Chinese music needs to try new things, just as there are many schools of thought in the arts, so does music. I tried to put a lot of different musical elements into this song, and the No Doubt element is one of them."

Commercially, Maybe Tomorrow was not as successful as A-Mei's previous records in Taiwan. It became her first to not rank in the country's top 20 year-end album sales charts, and earned the singer the lowest sales of her career at the time, with 80,000 units sold. The album's sales performance was attributed to its unorthodox musical style, lack of promotion and stiff competition by other artists at the time, as described by Sinophone publications. Adding fuel to the fire, it was also reported around the same time that her relationship with her executive agent Gao Yixiu had changed. The many highly publicized setbacks during the entirety of 2004 convinced A-Mei to take a one-year hiatus from showbusiness to study abroad in Boston, Massachusetts. She left for the United States to study on January 18, 2005.

=== Singles and music videos ===
The music video for "Love Is the Only Way" was directed by Jin Zhuo. A-Mei proposed to add homosexual love in the music video due to her being very moved by a gay wedding she attended before. The scenes of the gay wedding and kissing in the music video made the popularity of this song soar, attracting a strong reaction in the gay community. There was a strong reaction in the gay community, and after the video aired, the record company began to receive a steady stream of phone calls from fans, both encouraging and supportive, as well as gay people who wanted to talk to her. On the Yahoo dating site, many netizens immediately changed their nicknames to "Love Is the Only Way," with some netizens posting that this was the first time a singer had expressed their pure and simple love so eloquently. In October 2004, it was featured in American LGBT magazine The Advocate. The video ended becoming barred from broadcasting in the mainland.

The video for "Fire" was directed by Xu Renfeng. A-Mei changed into three sets of clothes throughout the video, including a suit, a denim jacket with fur, and a low-cut white gauze dress; the filming took more than twelve hours, with complicated changes of clothes and strenuous dancing. Jinhe Lin directed the video for the album's title track, which depicts A-Mei singing in a grey room and walking down a seaside in the end. The video for "Are You Well?" was directed by Jin Zhuo. On January 6, 2005, the song "Fire" was listed at number 60 on the Hit FM Top 100 Singles of the Year chart of 2004.

== Reception ==
Professional ratings
Review scores
Source	Rating
MTVChinese.com	2.5/5 stars
Freshmusic	6/10

Upon its release, Maybe Tomorrow received mixed reviews from most music critics. Yuzi of MTVChinese.com rated the album two and a half stars out of five; he praised the ambition of the album, but criticized it for having a lack of depth and stated that A-Mei's vocal cords were wearing out. NetEase appreciated the album's maturity, stating that while it has flaws, it is worth looking forward to.

Freshmusic gave the album a six out of 10 stars, calling it a precursor to her Amit persona, as well as singling out the songs "Love is The Only Way," "Fire," "Are You Well?" and the title track as its highlights.

== Accolades ==
Maybe Tomorrow earned A-Mei a nomination for Best Mandarin Female Singer at the 16th Golden Melody Awards. Jin Zhuo was nominated for Best Music Video Director for directing the "Love Is the Only Way" music video.

== Track listing ==
Maybe Tomorrow track listing
No.	Title	Lyrics	Music	Arrangement	Length
1.	"愛是唯一" (Love Is the Only Way)	Shih Li	A-Mei	Tman For 'Sonic Sanctuary'	3:57
2.	"火" (Fire)	A-Mei; Wang Leehom	Wang Leehom	Wang Leehom	3:17
3.	"發生什麼事" (What Happened)	A-Mei; Xu Guangyi; Shih Li; Jonathan Koh	Jonathan Koh	Jonko For 'Sonic Sanctuary'	4:36
4.	"你好不好" (Are You Well?)	Hu Ruhong	Dreamz FM	Tman For 'Sonic Sanctuary'	3:52
5.	"關鍵時刻" (Crucial Moment)	Shih Li	A-Mei	Tman For 'Sonic Sanctuary'	5:16
6.	"也許明天" (Maybe Tomorrow)	Shih Li	Martin Tang	Tman For 'Sonic Sanctuary'	5:04
7.	"只愛高跟鞋" (Love High Heels)	Shih Li	Xu Guangyi	Tman For 'Sonic Sanctuary'	3:16
8.	"娜魯灣情歌" (Love Song Of Nalu Bay)	Charles Tso	Charles Tso	Tman For 'Sonic Sanctuary'	4:04
9.	"過不去" (Can't Make It Through)	Kate Liao	Wu Guanyan; Yi Jet Qi	Ruth Ling	3:44
10.	"誰與爭鋒" (Who Is Fighting?)	Shih Li	Martin Tang	Tman For 'Sonic Sanctuary'	4:02
11.	"神采飛揚" (High Spirits)	Xu Guangyi; Wang Meilian	Xu Guangyi; Wang Meilian	Xu Guangyi; Wang Meilian	4:00
12.	"魅力十足" (Charming)	Tian Tian	Martin Tang	Martin Tang	3:26
13.	"愛是唯一" (Demo)	Shih Li	A-Mei		6:27
Total length:					55:10
