= Walkie-talkie (disambiguation) =

A walkie-talkie is a two-way handheld radio.

Walkie-talkie may also refer to:

- Walkie-Talkie (Apple), a push-to-speak messaging service for Apple Watch
- Walkie Talkie (band), a Taiwanese band
- 20 Fenchurch Street, a skyscraper in London also known as the Walkie-Talkie
- Mr. Walkie Talkie, 1952 U.S. comedy film
- Mr. Walkie-Talkie, stagename for German singer-songwriter Drafi Deutscher (1946–2006)
- Walkie-Talkie, Nazz's pet dog from the Cartoon Network series Ed, Edd n Eddy
- A term for chicken feet in South African cuisine

== See also ==
- "Walkie Talkie Man", a 2004 song by Steriogram
- Talkie Walkie, a 2004 album by Air
- Talkie
