= If There's Still a Tomorrow =

"如果還有明天"

Song by Hsueh Yue (薛岳)

from the album Life, Old, Sick, Death
- English title: If There's Still A Tomorrow
- Released: July 1990
- Recorded: March 1990
- Length: 5:11
- Label: New Flute Records
- Songwriter: Liu Weiren (劉偉仁)

If There's Still A Tomorrow (Chinese: 如果還有明天) is a Taiwanese pop song written and composed by Liu Weiren (Chinese: 劉偉仁) and included in Hsueh Yue (Mandarin: 薛岳)'s fifth album "Life, Old, Sick, Death" (Chinese: 生老病死), which is one of the main songs of the album. The original singer, Hsueh Yue died of terminal liver cancer in 1990, and he used this song to bid farewell to his fans at the "Scorching Life Concert".

Jacky Cheung (Mandarin: 張學友) sang "If There's Still Tomorrow" at the 14th Golden Melody Awards in 2003 as a tribute to Hsueh Yue.

== Background ==
In March 1990, Hsueh Yue was diagnosed with liver cancer and was given only six months to live. At the time, he was 36 years old, and his song "Airport" (Mandarin: 機場) was a hit. With the support of Wang Huiying (Mandarin: 王蕙鶯) from New Flute Records (Mandarin: 新笛唱片), he discussed with the record producer to produce the album "Life, Death, Sickness and Old Age". After frequent visits to the hospital, Hsueh Yue 's good friend Liu Weiren completed the lyrics of "If There's Still Tomorrow" in six days., and arrangement by Chris Babida.

Hsueh Yue also completed the music video for the song and bid farewell to his fans with the song at the Scorching Life Concert on September 17

== Cover versions ==
Hong Kong singer Jacky Cheung performed the song at the 14th Golden Melody Awards in 2003 to express his remembrance of Hsueh Yue. The song has also been covered by singers Shin (Mandarin: 蘇見信), Yuming Lai (Mandarin: 賴銘偉), Mayday, and Yu Guanhua (Mandarin: 于冠華) of the Starry Eyes Choir (Mandarin: 幻眼合唱團).
