= Yi Jet Qi =

Malaysian Chinese singer songwriter

Jet-Qi Yi
- Born: Miri, Sarawak, Malaysia
- Occupations: Singer song writer
- Years active: 1999–present

Chinese name
- Traditional Chinese: 易桀齊
- Simplified Chinese: 易桀齐
Transcriptions
Standard Mandarin
- Hanyu Pinyin: Yi1 Jie2 Qi2
Southern Min
- Hokkien POJ: Ia̍h Kia̍t-chê / Ia̍h Kia̍t-chôe
- Musical career
- Also known as: Yi Qi 易齊 (Traditional) 易齐 (Simplified); Yi1 Qi2 (Mandarin)
- Instrument: Guitar

Jet-Qi Yi (simplified Chinese: 易桀齐; traditional Chinese: 易桀齊; Pe̍h-ōe-jī: Ia̍h Kia̍t-chê / Ia̍h Kia̍t-chôe) is a Malaysian Chinese singer songwriter. Jet Yi or Jet (as he is also commonly known) hails from the town of Miri, Sarawak in East Malaysia. He has written many songs for accomplished singers such as Jacky Cheung, Jolin Tsai, Emil Chau, Rene Liu, Fish Leong, Penny Tai and Nicholas Teo.

== Discography ==
- Singles

2013 – 一生一世/有料生活/有料歌手／感覺愛

- Albums

2001 – First debut album 《戀戀不捨 Lian Lian Bu She》
2006 – Second album 《一整片天空 Yi Zheng Pian Tian Kong》
2008 – Third album《有你真好You Ni Zhen Hao》

- Single

2003 – [千里之外] Qian Li Zhi Wai

== Career highlights ==
Year	Artistes	Compositions
2009	"Ice Cream 4 U", Charity Show Theme Song (Malaysia)	需要爱 – Xu Yao Ai
2009	Huang Ya Li, 黄雅丽 (One of the participants of Super Girl)	相愛的人都等在這地方 – Xiang Ai De Ren Dou Deng Zai Zhe Di Fang
2009	Nicholas Teo, 張棟樑	不要再聽他寫的歌了 – Bu Yao Zai Ting Ta Xie De Ge Le
2009	Jolin Tsai, 蔡依林	我的依賴 – Wo De Yi Lai
2009	Fish Leong, 梁静茹	别再为他流泪 – Bie Zai Wei Ta Liu Lei
2009	Pei Jie, 培杰	881寂寞 – Bai Bai Ji Mo
2009	Pei Jie, 培杰	学生歌 – Xue Sheng Ge
2007–2008	Jacky Cheung, 張學友	好久不見 – Hao Jiu Bu Jian
2007–2008	Fish Leong, 梁静茹	Ces't La Vie (Album)
2007–2008	A-mei, 張惠妹	知己 – Zhi Ji
2007–2008	Rene Liu, 刘若英	熊 – Xiong
2007–2008	Guo Jing, 郭靜	慢慢紀念 – Man Man Ji Nian
1999–2006
1999–2006	Emil Chow (Wakin Chau), 周華健	好想哭 – Hao Xiang Ku
1999–2006	Jacky Cheung, 張學友	玩不起 – Wan Bu Qi
1999–2006	Fish Leong, 梁静茹	如果有一天 – Ru Guo You Yi Tian
1999–2006	Fish Leong, 梁静茹	我還記得 – Wo Hai Ji De
1999–2006	Fish Leong, 梁静茹	半個月亮 – Ban Ge Yue Liang
1999–2006	Fish Leong, 梁静茹	看海計畫 – Kan Hai Ji Hua
1999–2006	Fish Leong, 梁静茹	我是愛你的 – Wo Shi Ai Ni De
1999–2006	Fish Leong, 梁静茹	因為還是會 – Yin Wei Hai Shi Hui
1999–2006	Annie Yi, 伊能靜	你是我的幸福嗎 – Ni Shi Wo De Xing Fu Ma
1999–2006	Rene Liu, 刘若英	幸福的路 – Xing Fu De Lu
1999–2006	Rene Liu, 刘若英	I Believe
1999–2006	A-mei, 張惠妹	過不去 – Guo Bu Qu
1999–2006	Valen Hsu, 許茹芸	痞子 – Pi Zi
1999–2006	Power Station, 動力火車	陌生的夜 – Mo Sheng De Ye
1999–2006	Xing Xiao Qi, 辛曉琪	一個人甜蜜 – Yi Ge Ren Tian Mi
1999–2006	Daniel Chen (Hong Kong, China)陳曉東	一場雨 – Yi Chang Yu
1999–2006	Daniel Chen (Hong Kong, China)陳曉東	Good-bye
1999–2006	No Name	你最明瞭 – Ni Zui Ming Liao
1999–2006	Zhang Yu Hua, 張玉華	隨便你 – Sui Bian Ni
1999–2006	Huang Jia Qian, 黃嘉千	愛已升天 – Ai Yi Sheng Tian
1999–2006	Ho Yeow Sun (Singapore)何耀珊	那些幸福的事 – Na Xie Xing Fu De Shi
1999–2006	Ho Yeow Sun (Singapore)何耀珊	他還在等你 – Ta Hai Zai Deng Ni
1999–2006	Ronald Cheng, 鄭中基	Bed Time Story
1999–2006	Ronald Cheng, 鄭中基	看穿 – Kan Chuan
1999–2006	Wen Zhang, 文章	愛完結 – Ai Wan Jie
1999–2006	Gao Hui Jun, 高慧君	報應 – Bao Ying

Year	Showcases / Concerts
2009/2010/2011/2012	Ice-Cream 4 U Charity Concert (idea conceived by Jet Qi & Angelica Lee, 李心潔)
2008	Lee Guitars China Promotional Tour
2008	3rd album <You Ni Zhen Hao> Malaysia Promotional Tour
2008	Ntv7 Star Live Concert 2008 (live telecast)
2008	PWH Malaysia (Persatuan Wartawan Hiburan / Entertainment Journalists Association) Music Awards Night
2008	988 New Year Eve Countdown Concert (Radio Station)
2007	Hong Kong Ani-Comics & Game Fair Concert @ Hong Kong Convention & Exhibition Centre
2007	China CONVERSE Promotional Showcase (Beijing, Shanghai, Guangzhou, Hangzhou)
2006	Perfect 100 Charity Concert @ Stadium Nasional Bukit Jalil
2003	EP Launch – Christmas Eve Concert at The Actors Studio

== Filmography ==
- Ice Kacang Puppy Love (2010)
