= Huang Kan-lin =

Taiwanese baseball coach

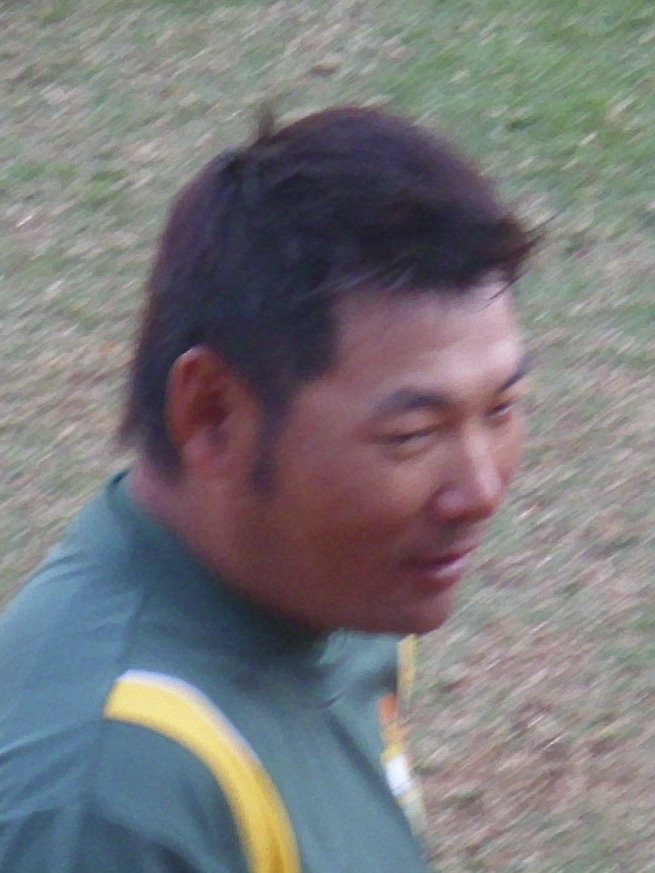

TSG Hawks – No. 53
- Center fielder / Manager / Coach
- Born: 12 March 1975 (age 51); Zhuqi, Chiayi County, Taiwan
- Batted: Right Threw: Right

CPBL debut
- 3 May, 1998, for the Uni-President Lions

Last CPBL appearance
- 2 October, 2010, for the Uni-President Lions

Career statistics (through 2010)
- Games: 894
- Batting average: 0.275
- Hits: 809
- Home runs: 25
- RBIs: 278
- Stolen bases: 295
- Stats at Baseball Reference

Career highlights and awards
- Golden Glove Outfielder - CPBL (2000-2004); Best Ten, Outfielder - CPBL (2000-2002); Player with Most Stolen Bases - CPBL (1999-2003)

Huang Kan-lin (Chinese: 黃甘霖; pinyin: Huáng Gānlín; born 12 March 1975) is a Taiwanese baseball coach. He played for the Uni-President Lions of the Chinese Professional Baseball League in center field for the Lions. He is currently retired, and is coaching the same team. He is the all-time leader in stolen bases of Chinese Professional Baseball League, with 295 in total.

== Personal life ==
Huang is currently married with C-Pop singer A-Lin, a Taiwanese singer of Amis descent. They were engaged on May 26, 2007, when A-Lin was approximately two months into pregnancy.
