= B. A. D. =

Taiwanese boy band

- Years active: 1998–2005
- Awards: Golden Melody Awards – Best Group; 2003 All I...
- Musical career
- Origin: Taiwan
- Genres: Mandopop
- Labels: EMI Taiwan (2000–2005)
- Past members: Ben Pai; Alex Tien; Danny Huang

B. A. D. was a former Taiwanese boy band whose members are Ben Pai, Alex Tien, and Danny Huang. The group's name derives from the initials of the members' given name. Pai, Tien, and Huang met at a singing competition in Los Angeles, and began working together in the spring of 1998. The trio was recommended to Liu Wei-tz'u, a manager who eventually sent them to Taiwan to work with EMI.

Under EMI, the trio released their debut studio album, Not Quiet, on 30 December 2000. Although B.A.D's début went under the radar, their second album, released in November 2001, put the group into the spotlight. That album, All I..., earned a Best Group Award at the 13th Golden Melody Awards and a nomination for Best New Artist at the 8th CMA Awards. In 2003, B.A.D. was nominated again for Best Group at the Golden Melody Awards, but lost to S.H.E.

== Members ==
The members of B.A.D. grew up in Taiwan prior to studying in the United States. Ben Pai, born 2 August 1979, attended California State University, Los Angeles during his tenure with the group. Alex Tien, born 12 September 1979, attended the University of Southern California during his time with the group, and graduated in June 2002. Danny Huang, born 9 July 1978, was a student at the Musicians Institute. For most B.A.D. tracks, Pai sings the high notes, Tien sings the middle notes, and Huang sings the low notes.

== Discography ==
- Not Quiet (December 2000)
- All I... (November 2001)
- Song To My Lovely Queen (November 2002)
- Beginning of My Dream (December 2003)
- B.A.D (December 2004)

== Awards and nominations ==
At the 3rd Global Chinese Music Awards, two songs—"Half an Ocean" and "Kingston's Dream"—combined to form B.A.D.'s nomination for Best Group. Best Group honours were ultimately won by Yu Quan, who won the Bronze Award, Twins and S.H.E, who shared the Silver, and F4, who won the Gold Award.

Year	Award	Category	Nominated work	Result	Ref
2002
2002	13th Golden Melody Awards	Best Vocal Collaboration	All I...	Won	
2002	CMA Awards	Best New Artist	B.A.D.	Nominated	
2002	Global Chinese Music Awards	Best New Artist	B.A.D.	Nominated	
2002	Global Chinese Music Awards	Top 20 Songs of the Year	"Lost Contact" (失了聯絡)	Nominated	
2003
2003	14th Golden Melody Awards	Best Vocal Collaboration	Song To My Lovely Queen	Nominated	
2003	Global Chinese Music Awards	Best Group	B.A.D.	Nominated	
2003	Global Chinese Music Awards	Most Popular Male Artist	"Half an Ocean" (半個海洋)	Nominated	
2003	Global Chinese Music Awards	Top 20 Songs of the Year	"Half an Ocean" (半個海洋)	Nominated	
2004	15th Golden Melody Awards	Best Vocal Collaboration	Beginning of My Dream	Nominated	
