= A-Lin =

Taiwanese singer and songwriter

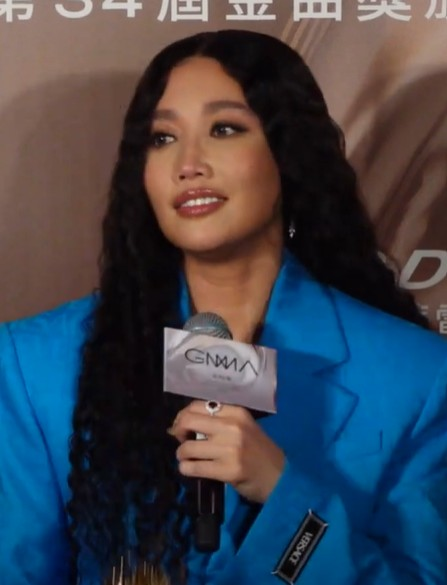
- A-Lin in 2023
- Born: Lisang Pacidal Koyouan; 20 September 1983 (age 43); Lingya, Kaohsiung, Taiwan
- Education: Chung Hwa University of Medical Technology
- Occupations: Singer; songwriter
- Years active: 2005–present
- Spouse: Huang Kan-lin (m. 2007)
- Children: 1

Chinese name
- Traditional Chinese: 黃麗玲
- Simplified Chinese: 黄丽玲
- Hanyu Pinyin: Huáng Lìlíng
- Musical career
- Also known as: Huang Li-ling; Lisang Pacidal Koyouan
- Genres: Mandopop; pop; rock; R&B
- Instruments: Vocals; guitar; piano
- Labels: Avex Taiwan (2005–2013); Sony Music Taiwan (2014–present)

Lisang Pacidal Koyouan (Chinese: 黃麗玲; pinyin: Huáng Lìlíng; born 20 September 1983), professionally known as A-Lin, is a Taiwanese singer and songwriter of Amis descent. She made her debut in February 2006 under Avex Taiwan with the studio album Lovelorn, Not Guilty.

== Career ==
In 1999, when A-Lin was 16 years old and taught children to sing the hymn "Amazing Grace" after the 1999 Jiji earthquake in Nantou County, she was discovered by her former agent. However, he was not available when she wanted to give him contact information. Fortunately, four years later, A-Lin met him again in a bar where she sang regularly. She was officially offered a singing contract.

A-Lin made her debut in the world of music at the end of 2006, achieving rapid commercial success. She has been called the next A-Mei, who is an aboriginal singer of Puyuma descent. She also got the nickname 天生歌姬, meaning "A Born Diva". A-Lin was often quoted as saying that A-Mei is highly influential to her music and often covers A-Mei's songs in music shows and concerts. A-Lin has won numerous music awards and is extremely popular within Mandarin-speaking world.

A-Lin has performed internationally and at a sold-out concert with Xiao Yu and Shin in 2012 at the Sydney Town Hall. It was her first visit to Sydney and people flew in from different cities just to see her. In 2013, with Avex Taiwan exiting the market due to overall poor sales from the records, all singers under Avex like Huang Li-ling were allowed to terminate their contracts early.

After terminating her contract, A-Lin signed with her new label Sony Music. In December 2014, she released her first album after leaving Avex. This album was nominated for Best Mandarin Female Singer, making her fourth nomination without any win.

In 2015, she participated in the third season of I Am a Singer and came in sixth on the finale held in March 2015. As a result, her singing ability was recognized by more people and provided a boost to her career.

== Style ==
While A-Lin considers herself as a Contralto, she has been noted to have an extremely wide vocal range closely identical to that of Amanda Seyfried, as noted in many of her songs to have over two octaves or more, and in the concert in Auckland, New Zealand, she was suffering from illnesses that made her unable to hit her falsetto range. She has also notably performed "Remember" (记得; Jìdé), by A-Mei, in infantile speech.

== Personal life ==
A-Lin is the youngest in her family. Her parents are Roman Catholics and love music. A-Lin's older sister is Taiwanese model Luji Huang (黄莉棋; pinyin: Huáng Lìqí), who entered the Super Star competition in Taiwan in July 2013 as an aspiring singer in her own right. In 2015, after A-Lin entered I Am A Singer, Lea became a contestant for 'The most beautiful harmonies' (最美和聲). They also have an older brother, and A-Lin's cousin-in-law is her fitness coach and also a guitarist. A-Lin was extremely popular as a student and the confidence she gained from this led to her decision to compete in a ''Singing Strength Elite Rivalry Competition'' (歌唱實力精英角逐比賽). She chose the hit song "At Least You Are Still There"' (至少還有你), by Sandy Lam, and the competition allowed A-Lin to believe she had a future as a professional singer. In reference to talent shows being readily accessible to young people these days, A-Lin commented, "I am impressed that there is now a Million Star-type of singing platform, which allows both everyone who enjoys singing and those who are talented singers a tough but realistic chance – an accomplished dream." They also have a brother.

On 1 July 2007, A-Lin married Huang Kan-lin, a well-known Taiwanese baseball player. They have a daughter, Huang Qiaoyu. (A-Lin said: "At the first time Huang Kan-lin requested a song "How Do I Live" by LeAnn Rimes in her Tainan Pub Session. However, at that time because of his poor English, he wrote "Good Do A-Lin" on a piece of paper and then spelled the song in homophonic Mandarin. The implication was that he wanted to chase after A-Lin because of her rich lips. Eventually, Huang Kan-lin proposed to A-Lin successfully by a new recorded song "How Love Will Go" (愛情問怎麼走).

== Discography ==
Studio albums

- Lovelorn, Not Guilty (2006)
- Diva (2008)
- Before, After (2009)
- Loneliness Is Not the Hardest Part (2010)
- We Will Be Better (2011)
- Happiness, And Then (2012)
- Guilt (2014)
- A-Lin (2017)
- Link (2022)

== Filmography ==
=== Film ===
Year	English title	Original title	Role	Notes
2018	More than Blue	比悲傷更悲傷的故事	Herself	Special appearance

== Awards and nominations ==
Year	Award	Category	Nomination	Result
2007	18th Golden Melody Awards	Best New Artist	Lovelorn, Not Guilty	Nominated
2009	20th Golden Melody Awards	Best Mandarin Female Singer	A Born Diva	Nominated
2010	Jade Solid Gold Song Awards	Most Popular Mandarin Song	Before, After	Won
2011	22nd Golden Melody Awards	Best Mandarin Female Singer	Loneliness Is Not the Hardest Part	Nominated
2012	23rd Golden Melody Awards	Best Mandarin Female Singer	We Will Be Better	Nominated
2015	26th Golden Melody Awards	Best Mandarin Female Singer	Guilt	Nominated
2023	34th Golden Melody Awards	Best Mandarin Female Singer	LINK	Won
2026	37th Golden Melody Awards	Song of the Year	"Happiness Is Singing" (from Happiness Is Singing)	Won
