= Waa Wei =

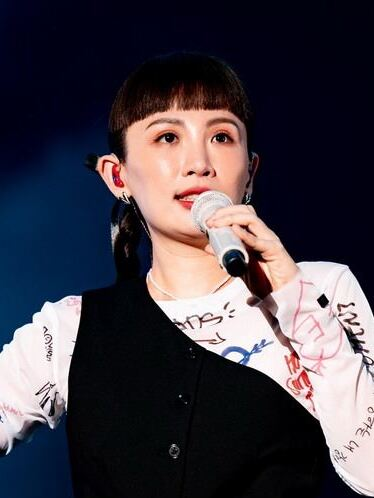
- Wei in 2024
- Born: 10 October 1982 (age 43); Fuli, Hualien, Taiwan
- Occupations: Singer-songwriter; radio DJ; author; actress; artist
- Years active: 2003–present
- Musical career
- Genres: Mandopop, dream pop, indie pop, indie folk
- Instruments: Guitar, piano
- Labels: Forgood Music (2016–present)

Waa Wei (Chinese: 魏如萱; pinyin: Wèi Rúxuān; born 10 October 1982) is a Taiwanese singer-songwriter, radio DJ, author, actress and artist. She was the former lead vocalist of the indie band Natural Q. She has published eight solo albums: La Dolce Vita in 2007, Graceful Porcupine in 2010, No Crying in 2012, You Lovely Bastard in 2014, Run! Frantic Flowers! in 2016, Hidden, Not Forgotten in 2019, Have a Nice Day in 2021, and Ordeal by Pearls in 2024. She also appeared in the 2021 film The Falls. She is a two-time recipient of the Golden Melody Award for Best Female Mandarin Singer, having won in 2020 for Hidden, Not Forgotten and in 2025 for Ordeal by Pearls.

== Discography ==
=== Studio albums ===
Title	Released
La Dolce Vita 甜蜜生活	8 November 2007
Graceful Porcupine 優雅的刺蝟	27 May 2010
No Crying 不允許哭泣的場合	10 November 2011
You Lovely Bastard 還是要相信愛情啊混蛋們	9 May 2014
Run! Frantic Flowers! 末路狂花	11 November 2016
Hidden, Not Forgotten 藏着並不等於遺忘	20 November 2019
Have a Nice Day	23 June 2021
Ordeal by Pearls 珍珠刑	24 December 2024

=== Extended plays ===
Title	Released
The Practice of Life Song 生活練習曲	31 October 2007
Bubble 泡泡	11 July 2008
Where 在哪裡	23 January 2011
Desert island without a Friday 沒有星期五的無人島	10 October 2012

=== Singles ===
Title	Year	Album
My dad's pen 我爸的筆	2010	Non-album single
Weaving Flowers 織花	2012	Non-album single
Bei Yu Shang Tou 被雨傷透 (幾米音樂劇「向左走,向右走」歌曲) (with Dawen Wang) (From "Turn Left, Turn Right. Love, Or Regret")	2016	Non-album single
only you 你啊你啊 (電視劇「用九柑仔店」插曲)	2017	Run! Frantic Flowers!
Wednesday or Happy hump day 星期三或禮拜三	2017	Hidden, Not Forgotten
Don't cry Don't cry Don't cry Don't cry – 公視:你的孩子不是你的孩子 主題曲	2018	Hidden, Not Forgotten
friDay Mode friDay 超展開 (with J.Sheon)	2018	Non-album single
Sunburn 曬傷	2018	Non-album single
Panic Attack 恐慌症	2019	Hidden, Not Forgotten
Blessing from The Street Corner 街角的祝福(青春重置計畫 3 劇好聽)	2020	Non-album Single
Only you (GMA special version) 你啊你啊 金曲主持人特別版 (featuring Evan Yo)	2020	Non-album Single
Have A Nice Day	2021	Have a Nice Day
April, Good for Lying 四月是適合說謊的日子 (featuring 裘德Chiu)	2021	Have a Nice Day
Dear Grandma 奶奶	2021	Have a Nice Day

=== Live albums ===
Title	Year	Note
2010 "Graceful Porcupine" Hong Kong Concert (Live); 2010《優雅的刺蝟》香港音樂會 (Live)	2011	CD was a pre-order gift of "No Crying"
Good Night Good Night Concert (Live) 晚安晚安演唱會 (Live)	2012	Live recording of the 2012 "Good Night Good Night" concert held in the Taipei International Convention Center on 4 March 2012
Maa Wei "Milk and Honey" Limited Edition Live Concert in Pregnancy; Maa Wei [Milk And Honey] 孕期限定演唱會 (Live)	2018	Live recording of the "Milk and Honey" concert held at the Taipei International Convention Center on 26 August 2018

=== Natural Q ===
Title	Released
C'est La Vie	29 April 2004
C'est La Vie Vol.2 大捲包小卷	24 December 2005

== As Radio DJ ==
She is a radio DJ of Hit FM (Taiwan), OH Night DJ(OH夜DJ) from 21:00 to 23:00 every weekday.

== Theatre credits ==
- Turn Left, Turn Right. Love, Or Regret, Miss Left, Taipei Cultural Center, 2013–2015, 2016

== Awards and nominations ==
=== Natural Q ===
Year	Award	Category	Nominated work	Result
2004	Singapore Hit Awards	Best Group/Band		Nominated
2004	Singapore Hit Awards	Best New Artist		Nominated
2005	Chunghwa Musicians Association	Best Ten Albums of the Year	C'est La Vie	Won
2005	Chunghwa Musicians Association	Best Ten Songs of the Year	"自然捲"	Won
2005	16th Golden Melody Awards	Best Album	C'est La Vie	Nominated
2005	16th Golden Melody Awards	Best Band	C'est La Vie	Nominated
2006	KKBOX Awards	KKBOX Indie Award	C'est La Vie	Won
2006	Chunghwa Musicians Association	Best 10 Albums of the Year	C'est La Vie Vol.2	Won
2006	Chunghwa Musicians Association	Best 10 Songs of the Year	"Calm and Sunlight"	Won
2006	17th Golden Melody Awards	Best Band	C'est La Vie Vol.2	Nominated

=== Solo ===
Year	Award	Category	Nominated work	Result
2010	Singapore Hit Awards	Best Female Vocalist	Graceful Porcupine	Nominated
2011	Chunghwa Musicians Association	Best 10 Albums of the Year	Graceful Porcupine	Won
2011	Chunghwa Musicians Association	Best 10 Songs of the Year	I Am Not a Mathematician	Won
2011	11th C-Pop Media award (華語音樂傳媒大獎)	Jury Prize	Graceful Porcupine	Won
2012	Hit Fm	2011 Best Album	No Crying	Won
2012	AMP music awards	Album of the Year	No Crying	Nominated
2012	Chunghwa Musicians Association	Best 10 Albums of the Year	No Crying	Won
2012	Chunghwa Musicians Association	Best 10 Songs of the Year	"晚安晚安"	Won
2012	23rd Golden Melody Awards	Best Album	No Crying	Nominated
2012	23rd Golden Melody Awards	Best Mandarin Female Singer	No Crying	Nominated
2012	12th C-Pop Media awards	Best Female Singer	No Crying	Won
2012	Golden Indie Music Awards	Best Album	No Crying	Nominated
2012	Golden Indie Music Awards	Best Singer-songwriter	No Crying	Nominated
2012	Golden Indie Music Awards	Best Indie-rock Album	No Crying	Nominated
2012	Golden Indie Music Awards	Best Rock Single	"隕石"	Nominated
2014	15th C-Pop Media Awards		You Lovely Bastard	Nominated
2015	Hit Fm	Best Ten Albums of the Year	You Lovely Bastard	Won
2015	25th Golden Melody Awards	Best Mandarin Female Singer	You Lovely Bastard	Nominated
2015	2015 Hito Music Awards	Hito Good Vocals	You Lovely Bastard	Won
2015	Chunghwa Musicians Association	Best 10 Albums of the Year	You Lovely Bastard	Won
2017	28th Golden Melody Awards	Best Female Vocalist – Mandarin	Run! Frantic Flowers!	Nominated
2018	29th Golden Melody Awards	Best Composer	"No No" (from Martial God Cardea) (shared with Sandee Chan)	Nominated
2020	31st Golden Melody Awards	Album of the Year	Hidden, Not Forgotten	Nominated
2020	31st Golden Melody Awards	Best Mandarin Album	Hidden, Not Forgotten	Nominated
2020	31st Golden Melody Awards	Best Female Mandarin Singer	Hidden, Not Forgotten	Won
