= I Want Happiness? =

2006 studio album by A-Mei

Studio album by A-Mei
- Released: February 17, 2006
- Recorded: 2005–2006
- Studios: Platinum Studio (Taipei); Incredible Ear Studio (Beijing); Atomic Studios (Singapore); Resonance Audio (Singapore); YYYD Studio (Beijing); Audio Plex (Singapore)
- Genre: Pop
- Length: 40:58
- Label: Warner Music Taiwan
- Producer: Eric Chen

A-Mei chronology
Maybe Tomorrow (2004)	I Want Happiness? (2006)	Star (2007)

Singles from I Want Happiness?
- 1. "Hostage" Released: January 29, 2006; 2. "I Want Happiness?" Released: February 17, 2006

I Want Happiness? (Chinese: 我要快樂; pinyin: Wǒ Yào Kuàilè) is the thirteenth studio album by Taiwanese recording artist A-Mei. It was released on February 17, 2006, by Warner Music Taiwan and was her final release with the label. After her 2004 album Maybe Tomorrow underperformed on the record charts, A-Mei took a one-year hiatus from the entertainment industry to study abroad in Boston, Massachusetts to return afresh. Eric Chen served as the sole producer of I Want Happiness. The album saw A-Mei return to her early lyrical style, featuring pop ballads with acoustic and stripped-down instrumentations. She sought to connect with her audience through heartfelt love songs that resonated with her fans.

In contrast to Maybe Tomorrow, which underperformed commercially and led to a career slump, I Want Happiness saw success in both sales and critical reception upon release, propelling A-Mei to another peak in her music career. The album sold 160,000 copies in Taiwan, becoming the seventh best-selling album of 2006. In mainland China, it was named the top-selling record of the year with sales of 970,000 copies. The album went on to sell over 2 million copies across Asia. A-Mei promoted I Want Happiness with a series of live performances throughout 2006.

== Background and development ==
In September 2004, A-Mei released her twelfth studio album Maybe Tomorrow. The album premiered with minimal fanfare and struggled in the record charts due to lack of promotion and stiff competition by other artists at the time. Her steep decline in popularity during this era convinced her to take a one-year hiatus from showbusiness to study abroad in Boston, Massachusetts. She left for the United States to study on January 18, 2005. Without an assistant, an agent, or family or friends around her while in Boston, she lived in a small apartment rented by a friend. During her stay, she took a three-month language study through Boston University's Center for English Language & Orientation Programs. This experience allowed her life to return to a simple starting point, and the emotional stories during that period were collected into I Want Happiness?. After returning to Taiwan, with the encouragement of producer Eric Chen, A-Mei abandoned many heavy arrangements and complicated productions, and simply used her voice to interpret the songs directly. Warner Music titled the album "A-Mei's private song, dedicated to all the sisters struggling in love."

The production of the entire album was coordinated by Eric Chen, and the text was coordinated by Wu Yukang. All ten songs in the album were tailor-made for A-Mei. Wu Yukang is a musician who A-Mei had worked with during her time at Forward Music, and therefore knows A-Mei very well, so he created the album's title track "I Want Happiness?" from A-Mei's perspective. On January 24, 2006, it was revealed that A-Mei would release a new studio album in February 2006.

== Writing and recording ==
The opening track "As Usual" is a lyrical song of A-Mei style. "Hostage" is a pop ballad with a guitar that is matched with a string quartet, a simple melody, and low-pitched vocals; the song lyrically depicts a woman's helplessness in love. She previously admitted that "Hostage" describes her ex-boyfriend Zhou Liping. "Acting Like a Child" is a midtempo folk song. "Because You" is a folk pop song. "I Want Happiness?" is a lyrical and heartfelt power ballad that depicts A-Mei's inner innocence and longing.

"Chinese Girl" is a unique combination of disco beat and rock style, with a bright and light rhythm, creating a very different space of imagination. "Shut It" is a song with rock and traditional Chinese music influences. The arrangement of "Simple" is based on rock and roll, combined with a relaxed flavor. "So I'm Willing To" is an AOR ballad. The album's final track is a cover of the famous 1993 song "Boundless Oceans, Vast Skies" by Beyond.

== Title and artwork ==
The album was named I Want Happiness? to remind listeners to pursue their own happiness, so A-Mei specially added a question mark in the album's title. On the album cover, A-Mei sports fluffy black long curly hair. For this album release, Warner Music specially invited Hong Kong's famous photographer CK to shoot A-Mei's album cover.

== Release and promotion ==
On January 24, 2006, Warner Music announced that the album would be released in February 2006. Pre-orders became available on January 27. The album reportedly sold over 100,000 pre-orders on the first day. The album's sales ratio on the G-Music chart in the first week accounted for nearly 30% of the total sales, 11.82% higher than the runner-up. On February 19, 2006, A-Mei attended a new album press conference, with many fans participating enthusiastically. On February 25, 2006, in Taipei, A-Mei held a new album celebration and signing event in Ximending, attracting hundreds of fans to come and almost packed the Ximending signing venue. On the evening of March 20, 2006, A-Mei held a fan meeting at Shandong Theater in Jinan. On the evening of March 21, 2006, A-Mei held a media meeting and autograph session in Beijing with her new album I Want Happiness?, attracting dozens of media outlets and nearly a hundred fans. On January 12, 2007, the album was placed at number ten on the annual album sales chart of 2006 for Five Music. On January 22, 2007, the album took the tenth place spot on the album sales chart of 2006 for G-Music.

On the evening of May 13, 2006, A-Mei performed at the "Passionate May Stars Shine the Sky" concert at Wuhan Sports Center with Jay Chou. On May 27, 2006, a ticketed concert was held at the Aladdin Theatre for the Performing Arts in Las Vegas, with all of the 7,000 tickets sold out entirely. The organizers also specially arranged for A-Mei to take a helicopter to the press conference venue to enjoy diva-level treatment. In June 2006, A-Mei participated in the finale performance titled "Music ORZ" at the 17th Golden Melody Awards.

=== Singles and music videos ===
On January 29, 2006, A-Mei released the single, "Hostage." The music video of the song was directed by Teng Yung-Shing. It was filmed in black and white, depicting A-Mei singing in a white dress in an empty room. The music video for "I Want Happiness?" was directed by Jinhe Lin. A-Mei showed her home life in the "I Want Happiness?" music video, lying on a large double bed, showing the loneliness of a single woman in the city. Kuang Sheng directed the music video for "Shut It." She plays two roles in the music video; one is a charming woman in a mini skirt, and the other is a woman with a ponytail and personality. A strong urban woman, in one scene she teases a male model sitting on the sofa, rubbing her body against him continuously. Jinhe Lin directed the music video for "As Usual."

In January 2007, the tracks "I Want Happiness?" and "Hostage" were listed at number 25 and number 93 respectively on the 2006 Hit FM Top 100 Singles of the Year chart.

== Critical reception ==
I Want Happiness? received positive reviews from music critics. Nala from Sina Entertainment commented that I Want Happiness? is so "moving" that every song is so "touching" that the more one listens to it, the more they like it. Stephan Lee from Sina Music commented that the feelings expressed in the songs are real and concrete, not exaggerated and pretentious. He also believed they will have high popularity, and that their popularity would be higher the songs from her previous record Maybe Tomorrow. Yeh Chun-pu from the Music Copyright Society of Chinese Taipei praised Eric Chen's production and claimed "it is a beautiful return of the queen."

== Accolades ==
In 2007, the album won the "Hong Kong and Taiwan Recommended Record Award" of the China Top Chart, also winning the All-Around Artist Award at the same ceremony. A-Mei received a nomination for Best Female Mandarin Singer at the 18th Golden Melody Awards.

== Track listing ==
I Want Happiness? track listing
No.	Title	Lyrics	Music	Arrangement	Length
1.	"As Usual" (平常心; Píngcháng xīn)	Xiaohan	Dreamz FM	Goh Kheng Long	4:11
2.	"Hostage" (人質; Rénzhì)	Coldplay Sister	Eric Ng	Eric Ng	3:52
3.	"Acting Like a Child" (不像個大人; Bù xiàng gè dàrén)	Francis Wang	Kevin Q	Theo Chou	4:27
4.	"Because You" (因為你在; Yīnwèi nǐ zài)	Yufang	Andrew Chen	Andrew Chen	3:18
5.	"I Want Happiness?" (我要快樂?; Wǒ yào kuàilè?)	Yu-Kang Wu	Dreamz FM	Goh Kheng Long	4:11
6.	"Chinese Girl"	Yu-Kang Wu; Luke Tsui	Chen Hsi	Ray Huang	4:28
7.	"Shut It" (不要亂說; Bù yào luàn shuō)	Biung Wang; Yu-Kang Wu	Biung Wang	Andrew Chen	3:20
8.	"Simple" (單純; Dān chún)	Kate Liao	Andrew Chu	Goh Kheng Long	3:50
9.	"So I'm Willing To" (所以我願意; Suǒ yǐ wǒ yuànyì)	Xiaohan	Dreamz FM	Ray Huang	4:34
10.	"Boundless Oceans, Vast Skies" (海闊天空; Hǎi kuò tiān kōng)	Yufang	Tan Boon Wah	Terence Teo	4:42
Total length:					40:58

== Charts ==
=== Weekly charts ===
Chart (2006)	Peak position
Taiwanese Albums (G-Music)	1

=== Year-end charts ===
Chart (2006)	Position
Taiwanese Albums (Note: Best-selling albums of the year in Taiwan as reported by media outlets)	7

== Sales and certifications ==
Region	Certification	Certified units/sales
Taiwan	—	160,000
Summaries
Asia	—	2,000,000
