= Vicky Chen (singer) =

Taiwanese singer-songwriter

- Born: Chen Hsin-yue; Taipei, Taiwan
- Genres: Mandopop
- Occupation: Singer-songwriter
- Instrument: Guitar
- Years active: 2018–present
- Label: SKR Presents
- Website: Vicky Chen on Facebook

Chinese name
- Traditional Chinese: 陳忻玥
Transcriptions
Standard Mandarin
- Hanyu Pinyin: Chén Xīnyuè

Chen Hsin-yue (Chinese: 陳忻玥), better known as Vicky Chen, is a Taiwanese Mandopop singer-songwriter.

== Early life and education ==
Chen majored in English at Fu Jen Catholic University.

== Musical career ==
Chen participated in Jungle Voice 2, a Taiwanese reality singing competition, in 2019. Her 2017 single "Smokescreen" went viral with over 40 million views on Youtube. Chen's female rendition of W.M.L's "Fiery Love" has over 20 million views on the same platform. Chen and OSN, another Taiwanese artist, worked together on a duet version of the latter's song, "Without You," also amassing over 20 million views. Collaborating with W.M.L again, the pair created another hit single titled "I'm Alive" which has garnered over 10 million views by the end of April 2023. She is currently under a Taiwanese record label, SKR Presents. In September 2020, Chen held a personal performance concert where she sang 20 songs back-to-back. Evangeline Wong, W.M.L, and OSN were audience guests at the invitation of Chen.

== Discography ==
=== Albums ===
Order of Release	Information	Song Track
1st	Am I Who I Am Release Date: April 13, 2020 Publisher: Ho Vision Entertainment Language: Mandarin	1. Am I Who I Am; 2. Smokescreen; 3. Treasure; 4. Just You and Me; 5. If You're Really Gonna Leave Me; 6. I'll Be Your Memory; 7. Fiery Love (Vicky's Version); 8. Hands Up; 9. Scumbag; 10. Till I'm Underground; 11. Life; 12. Nobody Ever Wonders; 13. I Dare You; 14. Baby; 15. Just You and Me (Unplugged Version)

=== Singles ===
#	Song title	Date of Release	Publisher
1	Smokescreen	December 19, 2017	SKR Presents SKR Co., Ltd.
2	Just You and Me	December 26, 2017	SKR Presents SKR Co., Ltd.
3	Just You and Me (Unplugged Version)	January 26, 2018	SKR Presents SKR Co., Ltd.
4	Baby	March 15, 2019	SKR Presents SKR Co., Ltd.
5	I Dare You	April 15, 2019	SKR Presents SKR Co., Ltd.
6	Nobody Ever Wonders	May 13, 2019	SKR Presents SKR Co., Ltd.
7	Till I'm Underground	June 17, 2019	SKR Presents SKR Co., Ltd.
8	Hands Up	July 22, 2019	SKR Presents SKR Co., Ltd.
9	Scumbag	November 18, 2019	SKR Presents SKR Co., Ltd.
10	I'll Be Your Memory	January 20, 2020	SKR Presents SKR Co., Ltd.
11	Fiery Love (Vicky's Version) 2020	March 9, 2020	SKR Presents SKR Co., Ltd.
12	Am I Who I Am	April 13, 2020	SKR Presents SKR Co., Ltd.
13	Treasure	May 18, 2020	SKR Presents SKR Co., Ltd.
14	Life	June 29, 2020	SKR Presents SKR Co., Ltd.
15	If You're Really Gonna Leave Me	July 27, 2020	SKR Presents SKR Co., Ltd.
16	My Love is Selfish	February 8, 2021	SKR Presents SKR Co., Ltd.
17	Painted a Picture	April 25, 2021	SKR Presents SKR Co., Ltd.
18	Who I Am	September 27, 2021	SKR Presents SKR Co., Ltd.
19	You Like Me	November 29, 2021	SKR Presents SKR Co., Ltd.
20	Enough is Enough	April 11, 2022	SKR Presents SKR Co., Ltd.
21	It Doesn't Matter	November 28, 2022	SKR Presents SKR Co., Ltd.
22	Give Up	April 3, 2023	SKR Presents SKR Co., Ltd.

=== Collaborations ===
Year	Date of Release	Album	Song title	Collaboration Artists
2019	February 12		Fiery Love	W.M.L
2019	August 19	#osnrap	Without You (Acoustic Version)	OSN
2020	July 20		Can You Accept?	W.M.L
2020	September 14		No Play (Fun Cover)	Evangeline Wong
2020	April 12		Fall in Love	Sophie Chen
2021	June 14		Changing	Evangeline Wong, OSN, W.M.L, Sophie Chen, Skot Suyama
2021	July 20		I Exist in Your Existence	Knife and Mouth (Sawyer)
2022	January 10		Hold Me Tight	Dena Chang
2022	February 14		I'm Alive	W.M.L
2022	April 28		Why Do You Leave Me Alone	Safe Liu
2022	April 29		LOVE Remix - 2022 EMZ Song of the Year	TRASH, Howard Lee, PIZZALI, G5SH
2022	July 5		Wave - 2022 Taoyun High School Graduation Song	Wave Artist Team
2022	August 8		Why Me (Fun Cover)	Jasmine Ting, Skot Suyama, Sophie Chen, W.M.L
2022	September 19		Beautiful Sadness (Fun Cover)	W.M.L

== Performances ==
=== Concerts ===
Year	Concert Name	Location	Guests	Notes
2022	Am I Who I Am	Legacy Taipei	OSN, Evangeline Wong, W.M.L, Skot Suyama	
2022	Golden Awards Concert	Riverside Live House	Dena Chang, PoLin	Performed with three other artists under SKR Presents
2022	SKY Family Party	NUZONE		Performed with three other artists under SKR Presents

=== Commercials ===
==== 2020 ====
- Yunlin Music Gala - Christmas Rock
- Tainan Young Christmas and New Year's Eve Concert - Rock and Hip Hop Night
- Hi School City Youth Forum 2020
- Taipei Miramar Golden End of the Year Concert - New Wave Reborn
- TOYOTA TV Christmas Goddess Collection

===== 2021 =====
- Penny Music and Beer Festival
- Ximen Play and Buy Music and Hangout Concert
- Tainan Young Christmas and New Year's Eve Concert - Rock and Hip Hop Night
- KKBOX Turn Up Festival
- KKNOW Turntable Top Three Live Program
- Happy and Sustainable Soil and Water Conservation Show
- 2021 Good Friends Life Festival - Eastern Broadcasting Company
- Hi School Exclusive Streaming for High School Students
- 2021 Outdoor Music Concerts for the Rest of Summer
- Taipei Music Nonstop Performance
- Rakuten Monkey Armor Party
- Halloween City in Taoyun
- 2022 Power Yilan New Year's Eve Party

===== 2022 =====
- 2022 Taipei Lantern Festival
- Drunk Play Moonlight Opening Party - Sunset Party x Night Party
- New Taipei CTBC DEA Zoo Theme Basketball Game
- KKTIX Taiwan Spaceport Venus Awakening Party
- Kaohsiung High School Music Festival
- TOYOTA TV Guest Performer
- Meishi Symphony Concert
- Qixi Coming-of-age Festival
- High Head and Chill Night Festival
- Endless Sunset x MIXTAKE
- LEXUS Electrified Music Concert
- 2022 Spaceport Music and Art Carnival
- 2022 Live in LiFU Festival
- Atayal Glory and Honor to Ancestral Spirits
- Not at Home Event
- 2022 International Water Outdoor Festival
- Taoyuan Youth City Forum
- 2022 Christmas Carnival Legend Show
- Pass the Vibe 2023 New Year's Eve Music Party Show

===== 2023 =====
- Pass the Vibe 2023 New Year's Eve Music Party Show
- Super House Night Club Show
- HISTAGE 4.0 Final Stage Show
- Enjoy Play Wild Show
- 2023 Vogue Picnic Day Show
- Super House Night Club Show
- LEXUS Electrified Show

== TV program participation ==
=== 2018 ===
- Hot Door Night

=== 2020 ===
- Jungle Voice 2
- Hot Door Night
- Super Followers

=== 2021 ===
- Hot Door Night
- Stylish Man the Chef

=== 2022 ===
- Hot Door Night
- AmazingTalker Show
- Jungle Voice 3
