= Faith Yang =

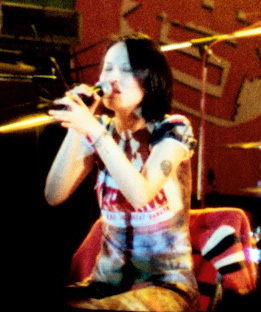
- Born: 2 March 1974 (age 51); Taipei, Taiwan
- Years active: 1996–present
- Awards: Golden Melody Awards – Best Female Mandarin Artist; 2000 Silence

Chinese name
- Traditional Chinese: 楊乃文
- Simplified Chinese: 杨乃文
Transcriptions
Standard Mandarin
- Hanyu Pinyin: Yáng Nǎiwén
- Musical career
- Also known as: Naiwen Yang
- Genres: Cpop; Rock
- Labels: AsiaMuse Entertainment (????–present); Silver Fish Records (2004–????); Rock Records (2001–2004); Magicstone (1996–2001)

Faith Yang Naiwen (Chinese: 楊乃文; pinyin: Yáng Nǎiwén; born 2 March 1974) is a Taiwanese musician. She grew up in Sydney, Australia and studied biology and genetics at the University of Sydney. In 2000, Yang won the Golden Melody Award for Best Female Mandarin Singer for the album Silence.

== Life and career ==
After graduating from Sydney University, Yang returned to Taiwan to start a music career. She soon gained recognition at the university and pub circuit in Taiwan while touring with her backing band – Monster. In 1996 she signed with Magicstone records. Her first two albums are heavily influenced by the Australian pub rock style, with a gothic undertone noticeable in tracks such as "Silence", "Fear" and "Monster", while her third album has a lighter pop style, with only hints of the anger evident in the first two recordings. All three albums were major hits in Taiwan and in 2000 Faith won the Taiwan Golden Music awards for Best Female Performer got nominated for Best Album (Silence).

Yang did not renew her contract with Magicstone, claiming the label had become too commercial for her style of music. In 2004 it was reported that she had signed with Sony label Silver Fish Records. Her first album with Silver Fish Records, Continuation (女爵), was released December 2007, with Self-Selected, an album of English-language covers, released in April 2009.

Yang also works as a fashion and cosmetics model for companies such as Rado and Neutrogena, as well as continuing to tour on the Taiwan pub circuit. She has also considered a number of acting roles. In 2000 Yang played the lead role in the 20-part web movie 175 Degrees of Colour Blindness (175度色盲).

== Discography ==
Date of release	Label	Title
1997	Magicstone	One
1999	Magicstone	Silence
2001	Magicstone	Should Be
2004	Rock Records	First Selection (Best-of Album)
2007	AsiaMuse Entertainment	Continuation
2009	Sony Music Entertainment	Self-Selected (Cover Album)
2013	AsiaMuse Entertainment	Zero
2016	AsiaMuse Entertainment	Centrifugal Force
2019	AsiaMuse Entertainment	The More Beautiful, The More Invisible
2023	AsiaMuse Entertainment	Flow
