= Stella Chang =

Taiwanese singer

Stella Chang (Chinese: 張清芳; pinyin: Zhāng Qīngfāng; born 31 August 1966) is a Taiwanese singer who won the Golden Melody Award for Best Female Vocalist Mandarin twice.

Chang debuted in 1985, and released over thirty albums. She married Sung Hsueh-jen in 2005. The couple moved to Hong Kong, where they raised two sons.
