= Power Station (Taiwanese band) =

Taiwanese musical duo

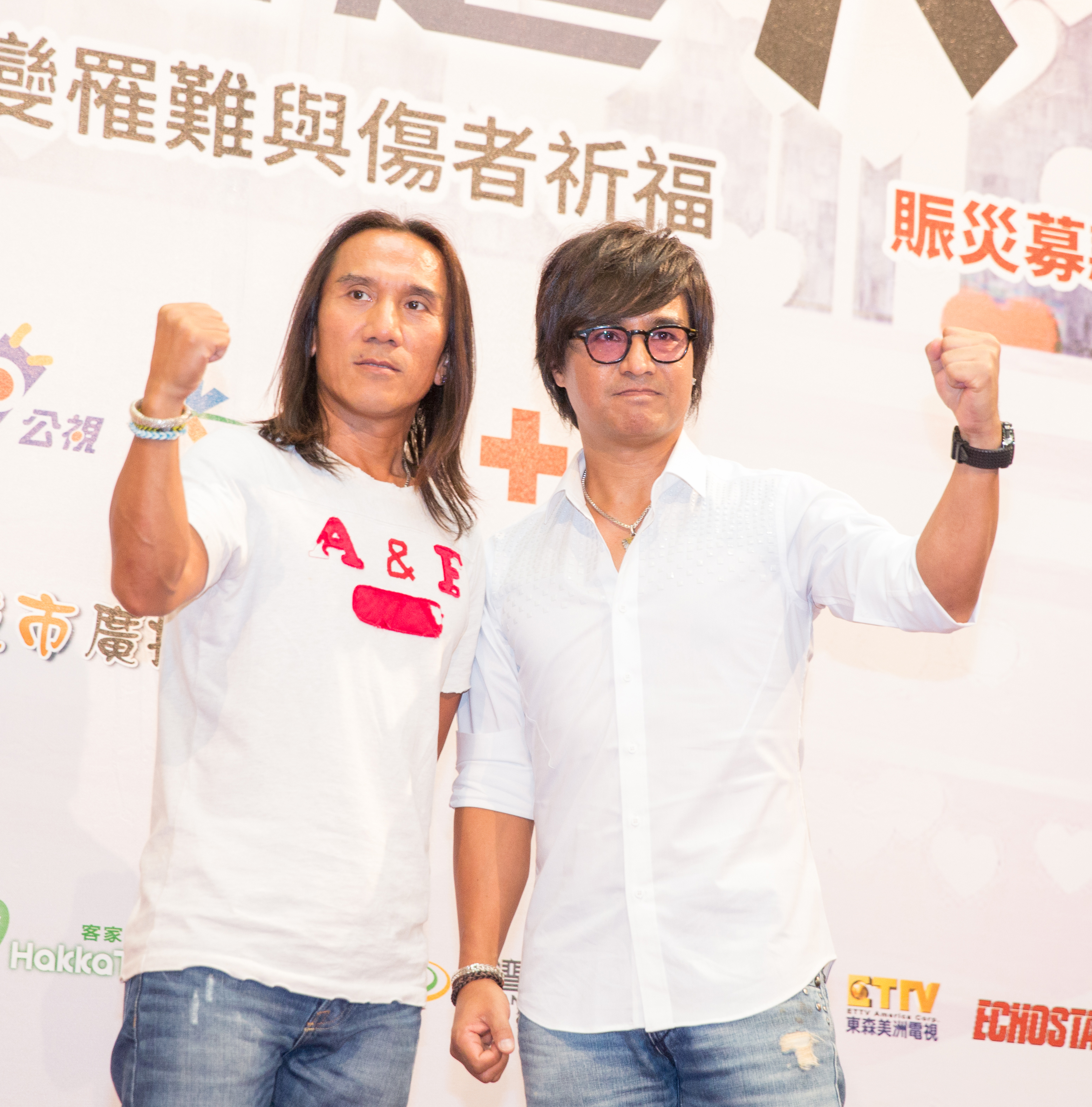
- Yen (left) and Yu at a fundraising event for the 2014 Kaohsiung gas explosions.

Background information
- Origin: Republic of China (Taiwan)
- Genres: Mandarin pop; rock
- Years active: 1997–present
- Label: HIM International Music
- Members: You Chiu-hsing; Yen Chih-lin
- Website: www.him.com.tw

Chinese name
- Traditional Chinese: 動力火車
- Simplified Chinese: 动力火车
Transcriptions
Standard Mandarin
- Hanyu Pinyin: Dònglì Huǒchē

Power Station (traditional Chinese: 動力火車; simplified Chinese: 动力火车; pinyin: Dònglì Huǒchē) is a Taiwanese rock duo, composed of Yu Chiu-hsin (尤秋興) and Yen Chih-lin (顏志琳), both of the Paiwan tribe of Taiwan's Pingtung County. Their music is characterized by their energetic rock ballads, as well as their electrifying rock anthems. Their looks and long hair stand out from the mainstream Taiwan pop scene because of their resemblance to western heavy metal musicians. In 2001, Power Station released their first album on the Grand Music label (later known as HIM International Music), Walking Along Zhongxiao East Road Nine Times. The title track of that album won the Silver Award for Best Mandarin Song at the 24th RTHK Top Ten Golden Song Awards.

== Biography ==
Yu Chiu-hsin (尤秋興) and Yen Chih-lin (顏志琳) graduated from Taiwan Adventist College in Nantou County, and formed a band called "Virgin Choir" (處男合唱團) with some friends before changing to "Prominent Position" (突出部位) and disbanding. At the ages of 25, they formed Power Station through singing western rock songs. After the release of their first album, their fame spread within the Chinese music scene in the 1990s. In 1998, they sang the theme song "When" (當) from the drama My Fair Princess, and in 1999 they won the Best Theme Song award at the Star Awards for their song "I can endure the hardship" from the drama Stepping Out. Since 1998, they have become well known for their interpretations of opening/ending theme songs from Singaporean TV serials such as Riding the Storm, Are You My Brother?, Stepping Out, and many more.

== Discography ==
=== Studio albums ===
- 1997-10-07: 無情的情書 (Ruthless Love Letter)
- 1998-04-01: 明天的明天的明天 (Tomorrow Never Dies)
- 1999-01-30: 背叛情歌 (Betrayal Love Song)
- 1999-12-08: 再見我的愛人 (Goodbye My Love)
- 2001-02-13: 忠孝東路走九遍 (Walking on Chung Hsiao East Road 9 Times)
- 2002-10-04: MAN
- 2009-03-27: 繼續轉動 (Moving On)
- 2013-03-29: 光 (Light)
- 2021-04-23: 都是因為愛 (Because of Love)

=== EPs ===
- 2021-02-26: 我陪你面對 (Power You Up)

== Awards and nominations ==
Organisation	Year	Category	Nominated work(s)	Result	Ref.
Star Awards	1999	Best Theme Song	"我吃的起苦"	Won	
Star Awards	2004	Best Theme Song	"爱在身旁"	Won	
Star Awards	2013	Best Theme Song	"珍惜"	Won	
Star Awards	2015	Best Theme Song	"逐梦"	Nominated	
Golden Melody Awards	2025	Best Vocal Group	"結伴"	Won	
