= Walkie Talkie (band) =

Taiwanese female duo musical group

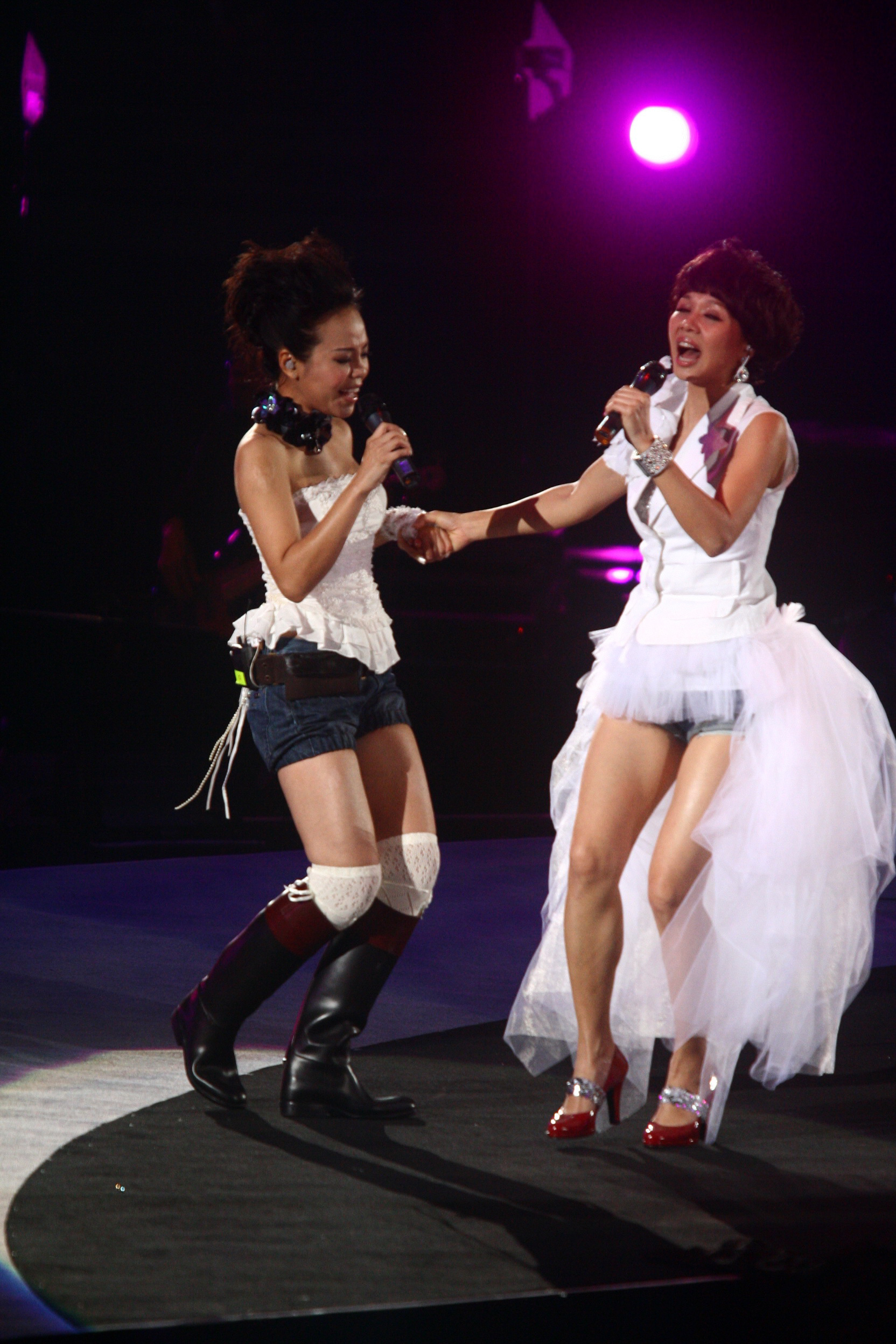
Image of the two singers in 2010

Walkie Talkie (Chinese: 錦繡二重唱) is a Taiwanese female musical duo, also translated as Jinxiu Duo.

== Discography ==
- June 25, 1998 《情比姐妹深》 (Deeper relationship than sisters)
  - 01 星期天不要見面 (Don't want to meet on Sundays)
  - 02 情比姐妹深 (No deeper relationship than between sisters)
  - 03 未了 (Outstanding)
  - 04 大峽谷 (Grand Canyon)
  - 05 给我爱情 (Give Me love)
  - 06 一同去郊遊 (Together to the Countryside)
  - 07 單飛 (Solo)
  - 08 愛失去了也好 (Love or Lost)
  - 09 不確定 (Unsure)
  - 10 錦繡前程 (Beautiful Future)
- March 26, 1999 《我的SUPER LIFE》 (My Super Life)
  - 01 我的super life (My Super Life)
  - 02 交換日記 (Swapping diaries)
  - 03 明天也要作伴 (Friends Tomorrow)
  - 04 才愛到一半 (Half-Love)
  - 05 自由活動 (Free Movement)
  - 06 快點!!快點!! (Come!! Come!!)
  - 07 牽牛花 (Morning glory)
  - 08 幸福 (Gokkun)
  - 09 你愛我 (You Love Me)
  - 10 灰色的雲 (Gray clouds)
- March 7, 2000 《錦繡三溫暖》(The Grandeur of the three warms)
  - 01 愛情得零分 曲：Shermann 詞：Shermann (Love in the zero song: Shermann words: Shermann)
  - 02 還是一個人 曲：Shermann 詞：林文炫 (Or a song: Shermann words: LIN-hyun)
  - 03 講真話 曲：薛忠銘 詞：姚若龍 (Qu speak the truth: XUE Zhong-Ming words: Long Yaoruo)
  - 04 HELLO 五彩汽球 曲：李正帆 詞：顏璽轩 (HELLO multicolored balloons song: Li Zhengfan words: Yuxi Xuan Yen)
  - 05 沒有你沒有感覺 曲：於秀琴 詞：於秀琴 (No you do not have the feeling of song: the Xiuqin words: in Xiuqin)
  - 06 最美的一天 曲：戚小戀 詞：厲曼婷 (The most beautiful song of the day: Qi small Love words: Li Man-ting)
  - 07 姐妹淘 曲：陳建寧/陳政卿 詞：鄭淑妃 (Jie Meitao song: Chen Jianning / Chen Zhenggao Big Words: Zheng Shufei)
  - 08 河堤 曲：黄中原 詞：謝銘佑 (Riverbank song: Huang Zhongyuan words: Xie Ming-yu)
  - 09 粉筆字 曲：boxx 徐繼宗 詞：boxx 徐繼宗 (Fenbi Zi Qu: boxx Xu Jizong words: box Xu Jizong)
  - 10 一直走一直走 曲：游鴻明 詞：姚若龍 (Has Been Walking Has Been Walking song: Yu, Hung Ming words: Long Yaoruo)
  - 11 可惜他不懂 曲：黃錦雯 詞：陳靜楠 (Unfortunately, he do not know song: Huang Jinwen words: Chen Jing-nan)
  - 12 月光 曲：周傑倫 詞：林怡芬 (Moonlight song: Jay words: Lin Yifen)
- November 14, 2000 錦鏽羅曼史I-美麗與哀愁 (Fairview romance |- is beautiful and is sorrowful)
  - 01 天涼好個秋 (Day cool good fall)
  - 02 一串心 (A string of good days)
  - 03 你那好冷的小手 (You that good cold microcheiria)
  - 04 深秋 (Late autumn)
  - 05 金盏花 (Marigold)
  - 06 秋詩篇篇 (Qiushipianpian)
  - 07 卻上心頭 (But on my heart)
  - 08 美麗與哀愁 (Peony Pavilion)
  - 09 風兒踢踏踩 (Wind step on tap)
  - 10 聚散兩依依 (Jusan two Yiyi)
  - 11 看到楓林小雨 (Fenglin see light rain)
  - 12 雁兒在林稍 (Lin Yan Er slightly)
  - 13 神話 (Myth)
  - 14 冬天里的一把火 (Winter fire)
- August 8, 2001 錦繡羅曼史II-夏之旅 (Beautiful Frotteurism II-summer trip)
  - 01 夏之旅 (Summer Tour)
  - 02 飛向你飛向我 (I fly towards you)
  - 03 海裡來的沙 (Nautical miles to the sand)
  - 04 思念總在分手後 (After the miss in breaking up)
  - 05 外婆的澎湖灣 (Grandmother's Penghu Bay)
  - 06 珊瑚戀 (Coral Love)
  - 07 碧城故事 (Bi-Story City)
  - 08 走在陽光里 (Walk in the Sun)
  - 09 愛神 (Spirit of Love)
  - 10小城故事 (Stories of the Little City)
  - 11何年何月再相逢 (Ho, Ho, then meet)
  - 12月朦朧鳥朦朧 (On hazy bird dim)
  - 13早安台北 (Good Morning Taipei)
  - 14我家在那裡 (Where's my home)
- May 7, 2007 二十年後的幸福：收录28首歌，其中有24首經典歌曲，另有4首新歌：愛到夏天、20年後的幸福、學會離開、一開始相戀 (After 20 years of happiness: recorded 28 songs, of which 24 classic songs, and four new songs: love the summer, after 20 years of happiness and learn to leave, at the beginning love)
