= Tension (Taiwanese band) =

Taiwanese musical group, 2001 to 2006

- Years active: 2001–2006
- Musical career
- Also known as: 天炫男孩
- Genres: R&B/Pop/A cappella
- Label: EMI Taiwan
- Members: John Baik, Andrew Lee, Jimmy Hung, Raymond Hu, Brian Fong

Tension was a Taiwanese R&B, pop music, and a cappella group that consisted of five members. The band was first signed by Shock Records, then signed by record label EMI Taiwan.

== Members ==
- Jimmy Hung - Vocal Position: Tenor
- John Baik - Vocal Position: Bass
- Andy Lee - Vocal Position: Baritone
- Brian Fong - Vocal Position: Tenor
- Raymond Hu - Vocal Position: Baritone

== Description ==
Tension is a Taiwanese R&B/pop group, signed by EMI Taiwan. The band consists of 5 members - Brian Fong, John Baik, Jimmy Hung, Andy Lee, and Raymond Hu. They were discovered during a performance at a local bar in Los Angeles by Taiwanese artist/producer David Tao. A record contract was offered to them a few months later, which sent them all to Taiwan as one of the first Asian-American groups to hit the market. Their first record album, Smart released in 2001, sold over 200,000 copies in a few months, giving them the highest first-week album sales during its release. After their success of touring and promoting their first album, they headed back to the states to work on their second album. While Tension was recording their next album, a legal dispute was placed against their first record label, Shock Records, making the group place a hold on its production. Their second album, Gotta be Your Man, was released in 2003. Tension received Best Album and Best Hit Single at the Singapore awards, and they were nominated at Golden Melody Awards for Best Group. They signed with record label, EMI, for their 3rd album, Planet love, which was pushed for an early release a few months after. They also recorded a compilation album titled "Story".

== Disbandment ==
In a TV show, Jimmy Hung said they have split up already. After the split, the band members still kept in close contact, though some of the members are in Taiwan and in America. The reason for the split was also stated by Jimmy Hung. He said that their music company, EMI, wanted them to sing cover songs from Korean and Japanese boy bands on which they did not agree on. Almost all of their members are composers and the reason why they are in the music industry is to create original music and not use other music, Hung said. In the end, after their contract expired, they decided not to renew it, and continue pursuing their dreams in a different way.

== Discography ==
=== Smart (May 2001) ===
1. Once upon a time
2. Smart 聰明
3. Our Story 我們的故事
4. Who are we
5. When I fall in love
6. Sorry 錯
7. Good-bye My Love(piano bar jam)
8. Irresistible
9. Crazy about you
10. Good-bye My Love(last dance jam)
11. Good-bye My Love 先說再見
12. One afternoon with Brian
13. Friends 只做朋友
14. Strange 壞女孩
15. Our Story 我們的故事(A cappella)
16. Thank you(interlude)
17. I'll be with you

=== Gotta be your man (May 2003) ===
1. Round 1
2. Challenge 挑戰
3. She's Having My Baby
4. Tell Me Why
5. Gotta Be Your Man 做你的男人
6. Every Step 一步一步
7. Arigato
8. One Minute 一分鐘
9. I Need You So Bad
10. One Life One Love
11. My Angel 恆星
12. Count off
13. Amazing Grace 奇異恩典

=== Planet Love (Jan 2004) ===
1. Planet Love 愛 星球
2. Love ATM 愛的提款機
3. Two Moons 兩個月亮
4. She's the one 感情線
5. Baby Girl
6. Miss You
7. Time Letter 時空信
8. True Love 愛星球
9. Always Love You 永遠愛你
10. Goodbye 是明天的 Hello
11. Baby Girl(Remix)

=== Story (Aug 2004) ===
1. 別想檔住我
2. 離歌
3. 我們的故事(A cappella)
4. 感情線
5. 壞女孩
6. Arigato
7. She's Having My Baby
8. Tell Me Why
9. 先說再見
10. 一分鐘
11. 恆星
12. Goodbye 是明天的 Hello
13. 聰明
14. 跟著月亮慢慢走
15. 愛的提款機
16. 做你的男人
17. 愛你失去自己
18. 同一首歌
19. 挑戰
20. 只做朋友
21. 兩個月亮
22. 愛 星球
23. I'll Be With You
24. 奇異恩典

== Publication ==
=== Very tension ===
中/英文书 Published on:1 January 2003, ISBN 986-7691-65-2 Tension's first confession of how they were formed and their initial journey and pursuit in their music career with photos of their daily lives.

=== 我們炫在一起 ===
繁體中文书 Published on：11 February 2004, ISBN：9578034601

A record of the Tension's growth. Complete info on TENSION's childhood, family life, first love, music preference with childhood photos and Tension's confession to each other.

The content of the book is segregated into 4 parts:

1. When we were kids
2. When we were in love
3. When we play music
4. When we are together

== Charitable events ==
Tension participated in the first Yellow Ribbon Charity Concert in Singapore in 2004. Brian specially recomposed the melody of "Tie a Yellow Ribbon Round the Ole Oak Tree" to A Capella version for the official launch of the Yellow Ribbon Project and Yellow Ribbon Fund on 2nd Oct 2004.

== Endorsements ==
- Doritos
- PH Land (麗嬰房)
