= Penny Tai =

- 戴佩妮
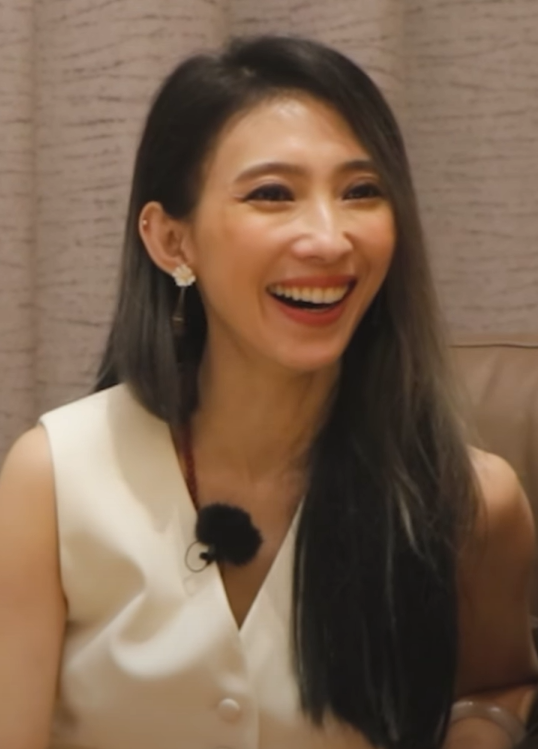
- Tai in 2024
- Born: 22 April 1978 (age 48); Segamat, Johor, Malaysia
- Education: Southern University College
- Occupations: Singer; songwriter; producer; director
- Years active: 1995–present
- Spouse: Sidney Lu (m. 2014)
- Musical career
- Origin: Malaysia
- Genres: Mandopop
- Instruments: Guitar; vocals
- Labels: EMI; Seed Music; Sony Music Entertainment

Chinese name
- Chinese: 戴佩妮
Transcriptions
Standard Mandarin
- Hanyu Pinyin: Dài Peìní
Yue: Cantonese
- Jyutping: Daai3 Pui3 Nei4
Southern Min
- Hokkien POJ: Tè Pōe-nî
- Website: www.iampenny.idv.tw

Penny Tai (Chinese: 戴佩妮; pinyin: Dài Peìní; Jyutping: Daai3 Pui3 Nei4; Pe̍h-ōe-jī: Tè Pōe-nî; born 22 April 1978) is a Malaysian singer, songwriter, producer and director. Since her debut in 2000, she has achieved many successes in her music career, including winning 5 Golden Melody Awards.

In addition to performing arts, Tai is enthusiastic about charity and was elected as one of Malaysia's Top Ten Outstanding Youths in 2011.

== Life and career ==
Tai started songwriting at the age of 17, participating in the Halo Songwriting Contest in Kuala Lumpur, a platform which also launched the career of fellow Malaysian singer, Fish Leong. In 1999 she was offered a contract by EMI Music (Taiwan) and moved to Taiwan pursue a career in singing and songwriting. She released her self-titled first album, Penny, in January 2000.

In 2006, she won Best Composer at the Golden Melody Awards for the song "Crazy Love" (title track to her 2005 album), becoming the first Malaysian artist to win a Golden Melody Award.

She subsequently won the Golden Melody Award for Best Female Mandarin Singer and Best Album Producer at the 25th Golden Melody Awards in 2014.

She formed the band Buddha Jump with the band D-power and released their first album, Buddha Jump, on 23 September 2011. Buddha Jump won the Golden Melody Award for Best Band in 2015.

Her most popular song to date internationally was the end theme for the Taiwanese drama Meteor Garden entitled The Love You Want (你要的愛).

She married Sidney Lu on 27 December 2014.

== Discography ==
Studio albums

- Penny (2000)
- How's That? (怎樣) (2001)
- Just Sing It (2002)
- No Penny, No Gain (2003)
- Crazy Love (愛瘋了) (2005)
- iPenny (2006)
- Forgive Me for Being the Girl I Am (原諒我就是這樣的女生) (2009)
- On the Way Home (回家路上) (2011)
- Unexpected (純屬意外) (2013)
- Thief (賊) (2016)
- The Passive Audience (被動的觀眾) (2022)

With Buddha Jump

- Buddha Jump (佛跳牆) (2011)
- Show You (給你看) (2014)
- BJ Shop (BJ肆) (2019)

== Awards and nominations ==
=== Golden Melody Awards ===
The Golden Melody Awards is an honor awarded by the Ministry of Culture of Taiwan to recognize outstanding achievement in the Chinese music industry and it has constantly been recognized as the equivalent to the Grammy Awards in Chinese-speaking world.

Year	Category	Work nominated	Result
2001	Best New Artist	PENNY	Nominated
2004	Best Female Mandarin Singer	No Penn, No Gain	Nominated
2006	Best Composer	Crazy Love (song)	Won
2006	Best Album Producer	Crazy Love	Nominated
2006	Best Female Mandarin Singer	Crazy Love	Nominated
2006	Best Mandarin Album	Crazy Love	Nominated
2007	Best Female Mandarin Singer	ipenny	Nominated
2009	Best Music Video	Wind	Nominated
2009	Best Music Video	Black and White	Nominated
2012	Best Band	Buddha Jump	Nominated
2014	Best Composer	The Fortunate One	Nominated
2014	Best Album Producer	Hugging You	Won
2014	Best Female Mandarin Singer	Unexpected	Won
2015	Best Musical Arrangement	Show You	Won
2015	Best Band	Show You	Won
2017	Best Vocal Recording Album	Thief	Nominated
2018	Best Album Producer	ExtraOrdinary	Nominated
2023	Best Female Mandarin Singer	The Passive Audience	Nominated
2023	Best Composer	Farce	Nominated
