= Shunza =

Chinese–American singer-songwriter (born 1973)

Shunza 順子
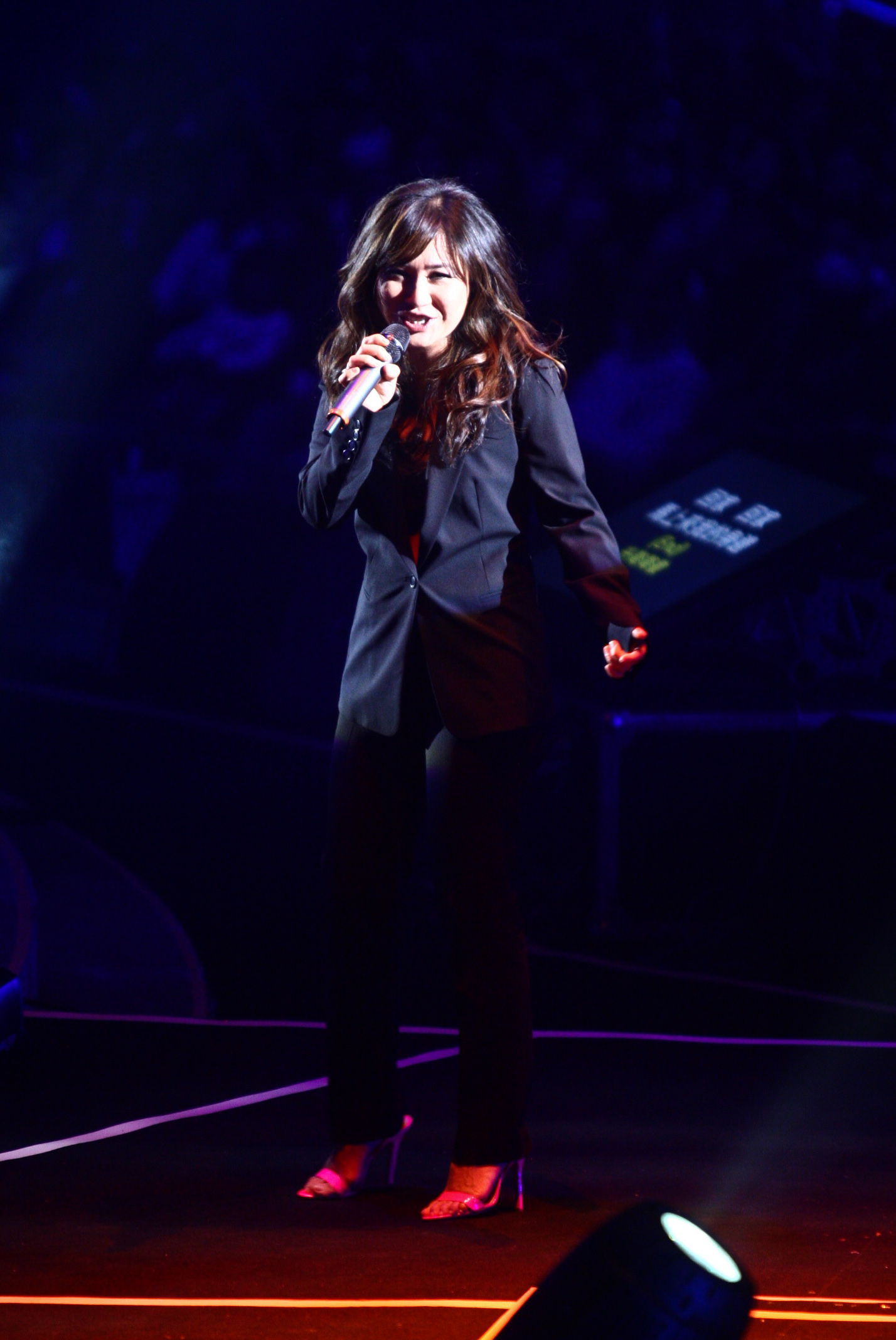
- Shunza in 2010
- Born: Ni Lianchun (倪蓮春); February 12, 1973 (age 53); Beijing, China
- Occupation: Singer-songwriter
- Years active: 1997–2006
- Awards: Golden Melody Awards – Best Mandarin Female Singer; 1999
- Musical career
- Origin: Beijing, China
- Genres: Pop, Jazz, R&B, Electronica
- Instrument: Piano
- Labels: Magic Stone Music (1996–2000); EMI Taiwan (2001–2003); Seed Music (2004–2006); Elevenz Music (2014–)
- Formerly of: Duty Free

Shunza (born 12 February 1973) is a Chinese–American singer-songwriter known for her "velvet" voice and love ballads. Unlike most pop idols who perform in front of screaming fans, Shunza's concerts are more intimate and cocktail-style. Over the course of her career, she has collaborated with Taiwanese artists such as Elva Hsiao and Will Pan.

== Early life ==
Ni Lianchun was born on February 12, 1973, as the youngest of two children. Her father Ni Yaochi (倪耀池) was a clarinet player, while her mother Huang Ailian (黃愛蓮) was a well-known pianist. At the age of three, she, her mother, and her older sister Ni Lianqing (倪蓮青; as known as Ni Qingqing) moved from Beijing to the San Francisco Bay Area as a result of divorce. Upon graduating high school, Shunza studied at the School of Jazz and Contemporary Music in Lausanne, Switzerland EJMA – http://www.ejma.ch. It was there that she founded a band called Duty Free, releasing a few works in Europe. In 1994, Magic Stone Music, a subsidiary of Rock Records, received one of her demo tapes, and consequently signed her to a record contract.

== Musical career ==
Since her debut, Shunza has released numerous albums in Mandarin, Japanese, English, and French. In 1999, she was hailed as the Best Female Singer and Best Composer at the 10th Golden Melody Awards. In October 2000, Shunza signed on with EMI, joining Cantopop sensation Faye Wong.

== Discography ==
=== Taiwan ===
- 順子 SHUNZA (November 1997)
- i am not a star (September 1998)
- OPEN UP (March 1999)
- 昨日。唯一。更多 Yesterday.one.More (March 9, 2001)
- ...and Music's there... (May 8, 2001)
- dear SHUNZA (January 8, 2002)
- 我的朋友Betty Su (April 25, 2003)
- 滾石香港黄金十年：順子精選 (June 7, 2003)
- 日日夜夜...我最愛的順子 (September 19, 2003)
- Songs for Lovers (January 19, 2006)
- Sunrises (November 14, 2008)
- To The Top 超越 (April 5, 2014)

=== Japan ===
- INSPIRATION (January 1999, single)
- INSPIRATION (February 1999)
- Open Up (July 1999)
- 亜洲金曲精選二千 順子 (June 21, 2000)
