= 14th Golden Melody Awards =

Taiwanese music award ceremony in 2003

- Location: National Taiwan University Sports Center, Taiwan
- Hosted by: Tao Ching-Ying

Television/radio coverage
- Network: Azio TV

The 14th Golden Melody Awards ceremony was held at the National Taiwan University Sports Center in Taipei, Taiwan. The ceremony was pushed back to 2 August 2003 from the original May date due to the SARS outbreak.

In this year event, Hong Kong singer Eason Chan won "The album of the year" and "Best Male Singer" resort to his studio album called "Special Thanks To...". He is the first non-Taiwanese singer that win "The album of the year" and the second non-Taiwanese singer that win "Best Male Singer".
