= A-Mei New Century Collection =

Greatest hits album by A-Mei
- Released: December 28, 1999
- Recorded: 1996–1999
- Genre: Pop music, dance-pop
- Label: Forward Music

A-Mei chronology
| Can I Hug You, Lover? (1999) | A-Mei New Century Collection (1999) | Time to Say Goodbye, A-Mei Hong Kong Live (2000) |

A-Mei New Century Collection is the first greatest hits album by Taiwanese singer A-Mei. It was released on December 28, 1999, by Forward Music. The album contains Sprite's 2000 advertising song "I Want to Fly," along with the charity single "Love, Never Disappears," which was specially composed by Leehom Wang for the 1999 Jiji earthquake victims. In addition, the album also includes A-Mei's past best-selling hit singles from her previous studio albums that were released between 1996 and 1999. Commercially, A-Mei New Century Collection was a huge success in Greater China, selling over 410,000 copies in Taiwan, while also selling over 3 million copies throughout Asia. It is also Taiwan's best-selling album by a female artist in the 21st century, along with being the third best-selling album in Taiwan of the year 2000.

== Background and release ==
In March 1996, A-Mei signed a recording contract with Forward Music, through which she later released five studio albums—Sisters (1996), Bad Boy (1997), You Make Me Free Make Me Fly! (1997), Holding Hands (1998) and Can I Hug You, Lover? (1999). The five albums have sold more than 1.21 million, 1.38 million, 800,000, 1.1 million copies, and 1.18 million copies in Taiwan, respectively.

On December 28, 1998, Forward Music released a double-disc greatest hits album titled A-Mei New Century Collection, which contains A-Mei's 18 previously released songs and two new bonus tracks titled "I Want to Fly" and "Love, Never Disappears."

In January 2001, the track "I Want to Fly" was listed at number 11 on the 2000 Hit FM Top 100 Singles of the Year chart.

== Track listing ==
CD1
| No. | Title | Lyrics | Music | Arrangement | Length |
|---|---|---|---|---|---|
| 1. | "我要飛" (I Want to Fly) | Wu Yukang | Chen Chih-yuan | Lu Shaochun | 3:36 |
| 2. | "愛﹐永遠不會消失" (Love, Never Disappears) | Shifang | Wang Leehom | Eric Hung | 5:49 |
| 3. | "一想到你呀" (Whenever I Think About You) | Chang Yu-sheng | Chang Yu-sheng | Koji Sakurai | 4:48 |
| 4. | "最愛的人傷我最深" (The One Who Loved Me Most, Hurt Me The Most) | Wu Yukang | Chen Chih-yuan | Ricky Ho | 5:02 |
| 5. | "不要騙我" (Don't Lie To Me) | David Tao | David Tao | David Tao | 4:52 |
| 6. | "牽手" (Holding Hands) | Chen Zhihan | Chen Zhihan | Martin Tang | 4:25 |
| 7. | "愛到不能收" (Love Until You Can't Receive) | Wang Zhongyan | Jonathan Koh | Ricky Ho | 5:13 |
| 8. | "一個人跳舞" (Dancing Alone) | Yu Guangyan | Sky Wu | Baby Chung | 4:29 |
| 9. | "對愛投降" (Surrender to Love) | Wu Yukang | Guo Tzu | Goh Kheng Long | 5:12 |
| 10. | "解脫" (Release) | Daryl Yao | Jonathan Koh | Jonathan Koh | 4:41 |

CD2
| No. | Title | Lyrics | Music | Arrangement | Length |
|---|---|---|---|---|---|
| 1. | "解脫" (Sisters) | Chang Yu-sheng | Chang Yu-sheng | Wang Jikang | 4:23 |
| 2. | "我無所謂" (I Do Not Mind) | Eric Lin | Michael Tu | Michael Tu | 4:58 |
| 3. | "What's Up?" | Linda Perry | Linda Perry | 4 Non Blondes | 5:21 |
| 4. | "別在傷口灑鹽" (Don't Rub Salt in the Wound) | Wu Yukang | Guo Tzu | Wang Yumin | 5:12 |
| 5. | "甜言蜜語" (Sweet Words) | Zheng Huajuan | Zheng Huajuan | Koji Sakurai | 4:51 |
| 6. | "Can I Hug You" (我可以抱你嗎) | Johnny Chen | Johnny Chen | Jiang Jianmin | 4:56 |
| 7. | "給我感覺 (Unplugged)" (Give Me Feelings) | Wu Yukang, Chen Zhihan | Chen Chih-yuan | Ricky Ho | 4:01 |
| 8. | "聽海" (Listen to the Sea) | Eric Lin | Michael Tu | Michael Tu | 5:20 |
| 9. | "水藍色眼淚" (Seafoam Blue Tears) | Chang Yu-sheng | Chang Yu-sheng | Baby Chung | 5:34 |
| 10. | "聽你.聽我" (Listen to You, Listen to Me) | Guangyu | Chen Chih-yuan | Koji Sakurai | 4:59 |
