= Singer Season 11 =

Singer
- Season 11
- Hosted by: He Jiong（Main Rounds） Na Ying（Episode 1）
- Finals venue: Hunan Broadcasting System
- No. of episodes: 13

Release
- Original network: Hunan Television
- Original release: May 22 – August 14, 2026

Season chronology
- ← Previous; Season 10 (2025)

The eleventh season of Chinese television series Singer (Chinese: 歌手; previously titled I Am a Singer), a Friday prime time music reality show, was broadcast on Hunan Television and Mango TV between May and August 2026. Singer 2026 is still produced by Zhang Danyang, who is part of the team of Hong Xiao and its music director is Taiwanese senior musician George Chen Chien Chi. The season premiere was broadcast live on May 22, 2026, at HBS production base (commonly known as the seven colourful boxes) in Changsha, the capital city of Hunan province, and this was the fifth season to feature returning contestants, after season five, season eight, season nine and season ten The season premiered on 22 May 2026, and will end on 14 August 2026.

Singer 2026 continues to gather famous singers of Greater China and other regions to participate.

== Competition rules ==
Not yet revealed

== Production process ==
=== Early preparations ===
The sign up channel for the audience members of the program in this season will officially open at 12 noon Beijing time on 27 April 2026. That evening, a set of AI-generated posters featuring《Singer 2026》line-up of initial singers began circulating online. This set of posters highly matched the official layout of the production team in visual design, and included names such as Angela Zhang, Henry Lau, and Mai Mizuhashi, who were previously rumored to be part of the Singer line-up. That evening, Mai Mizuhashi, who was rumored to be one of the initial singers, responded first, claiming that "she was also surprised", whereas she did not make a clear statement regarding the authenticity of the content in the poster. However, the performances of Japanese artists have been completely suspended in China starting from 28 November 2025 due to the 2025 China–Japan diplomatic crisis. On April 28, the production team issued a statement through its official Weibo account, stating that the posters in question were all created by netizens and were not official version, and the official line-up have not been announced .

On 15 May 2026, Hunan Television and Mango TV broadcast a special project of《Singer 2026》, featuring interviews with ten participating singers from past seasons: Susan Huang, Wei Wei, Kit Chan, Joey Yung, Jam Hsiao, Tengger, Yang Kun, Charlie Zhou, Na Ying, and Jess Lee. On 16 May, the production team announces the line-up of the initial singers for this season officially on its official Weibo account.

== Competition details ==
=== First round ===
==== Opening Round ====
Episode 1 is the first round of competition for Singer 2026, which is also the first opening round. It was broadcast live on 22 May 2026 at 19:30 CST.

Singer 2026 First Opening Round 22 May 2026 Host：He Jiong, Na Ying
Order	Singer	Music Partner	Song Title	Original Singer	Lyricist	Composer	Arranger	Rank
1	Waa Wei	Zoelly Wu	末路狂花 Run! Frantic Flowers!	Waa Wei		Waa Wei; Kain Han; Shuo Hsiao	Kain Han; Huang Shao Yong; George Chen Chien Chi	8
2	Harlem Yu	Zhao Yi Deng	让我一次爱个够 Give You All My Love	Harlem Yu	Chia-Li Chen	Harlem Yu	Terence Hsieh; Chase Jackson	9
3	Albert Stanaj	Cindy Yen	I Don't Want to Miss a Thing	Aerosmith	Diane Warren		Chen Mudi	5
4	Azora Chin	Leo Dong	是你想成为的大人吗	Azora Chin	Tang Tian	Qian Lei	He Shan	2
5	Tiger Hu	Leo Li	你要的全拿走 Take Everything You Want	Tiger Hu			Jason Gu; Tiger Hu	3
6	Leah Dou	Aaron Zheng	同一片天空下	Leah Dou			Leah Dou; Ernest Choi; Daniel Toh	4
6	Leah Dou	Aaron Zheng	Don't Break My Heart	Blank Panther	Dou Wei		Leah Dou; Ernest Choi; Daniel Toh	4
7	Eric Chou	Light Zhuang	永不失联的爱 Unbreakable Love	Eric Chou	Rao Xueman	Eric Chou	Chen Mudi; Eric Chou	6
8	Diamond Zhang	Nicholas Zhang	Interstellar	Diamond Zhang		Andreas Öhrn; Peter Boström; Didrik Thott	Kay Peng; Jiang Yu; Guo Xiaofeng	7
9	Chyi Yu	Zhe Lai Nu	橄榄树 The Olive Tree	Chyi Yu	San Mao	Li Tai-hsiang	Blackie Wu	1

==== Percentages of votes ====
Singer 2026 First Opening Round Percentages of Votes
Rank	Singer	Number of Votes	Percentages of Votes
1	Chyi Yu	371	18.66%
2	Azora Chin	325	16.34%
3	Tiger Hu	269	13.53%
4	Leah Dou	266	13.38%
5	Albert Stanaj	207	10.41%
6	Eric Chou	195	9.80%
7	Diamond Zhang	174	8.75%
8	Waa Wei	141	7.09%
9	Harlem Yu	40	2.01%
Number of Valid Votes		1988

=== Final ===
Episode 12 is the twelfth round of competition for Singer 2026, which is also the final. It was broadcast live on 7 August 2026 at 19:30 CST. The final is divided into two rounds and consists of the first round and the second round. The first round of the final being a duet segment and the second round being a solo performance.

==== First round ====
The first round of the final is a duet segment, with every singer inviting a guest singer for a duet together

Singer 2026 Final First Round 7 August 2026 Hosts: He Jiong, Allen Su
Order	Singer	Music Partner	Guest Singer	Song Title	Original Singer	Lyricist	Composer	Arranger	Rank
1	Elliot James Reay	Helen Qin	Lars Huang	Somewhere Only We Know	Keane	Tim Rice-Oxley; Tom Chaplin; Richard Hughes			
2	Bird Zhang	Fu Anqi	William Wei	《The Carnival in Babel》	Wu Qing-feng				
3	胡彦斌	李莎旻子	韩 磊	《走四方》	韩 磊	李海鹰		谷 粟 胡彦斌	
4	齐 豫	者来女	毛阿敏	《相思》	毛阿敏	赵小源	三 宝		
5	窦靖童	郑方一	欧阳娜娜	《被驯服的象》	蔡健雅	徐熙娣	蔡健雅		
6	万妮达	马 萱	吴碧霞	《花田錯》	王力宏	陈镇川	王力宏		
7	尤长靖	谭 薇	龚琳娜	《平日快乐》	孙燕姿	Hush	郭文贤		
7	尤长靖	谭 薇	龚琳娜	《Rasa Sayang》	马来亚民歌				

===== Percentages of votes =====
歌手2026 总决赛第一轮得票率
排名	歌手	得票数	得票率
1
2
3
4
5
6
7
有效票数

==== Second Round ====
总决赛第二轮为独唱。累积两轮得票率与月度加权产生本季歌王。本轮竞演出场顺序由第一轮出场顺序倒序产生。

歌手2026 总决赛第二轮 2026年8月7日 主持人：何炅、蘇醒
出场顺序	歌手	音樂合夥人	演唱曲目	原唱	作词	作曲	编曲	排名
1	尤长靖	谭 薇	《闭嘴跳舞》	李宇春	李宇春; Ola Svensson; Kristofer Östergren; Andreas Levander	Ola Svensson; Kristofer Östergren; Andreas Levander		
2	万妮达	马 萱	《再见》	張震嶽				
3	窦靖童	郑方一	《空中飞人》	窦靖童		窦靖童 蔡智光		
4	齐 豫	者来女	《外婆的澎湖湾》	潘安邦	叶佳修			
4	齐 豫	者来女	《光阴的故事》	罗大佑				
5	胡彦斌	李莎旻子	《生死未定》	胡彦斌			谷 粟 胡彦斌	
6	张 远	付安琪	《无所求必满载而归》	陈 粒				
7	Elliot James Reay	覃与钦	《I Think They Call This Love》	Elliot James Reay	Elliot James Reay; Annielle Lisiuk; Glen Roberts			

===== Percentages of votes =====
歌手2026 总决赛第二轮得票率
排名	歌手	得票数	得票率
1
2
3
4
5
6
7
有效票数

==== 歌王之战 ====
歌手2026 歌王之战总排名
排名	歌手	总决赛第一轮得票率（排名）	总决赛第二轮得票率（排名）	月度加权	总得票率
1
2
3
4
5
6
7

== Broadcast Platforms ==
The season will begin airing on 22 May 2026, with the show broadcast live every Friday at 19:30 CST on both Hunan TV and Mango TV. It will also be the first time to implement dual-platform 4K ultra-high-definition large-screen live broadcast. During the live broadcast, Mango TV will simultaneously provide live camera footage from the Singer's Home and live individual camera footage of each singer. Mango TV subscribers can also watch the "Advanced Show" segment and "Additional Version" segment on demand every Thursday and every Saturday at 12:00 CST. It will be broadcast exclusively through the Mango TV International APP (MangoTV) for foreign countries. All the songs in this season's competition are available in both live and collection's edition versions.

Malaysia's Astro QJ and Singapore's HUB E City will broadcast this season's program live every Friday night, simultaneously with Hunan TV and Mango TV, starting 22 May.

== Viewership ==
Mainland China Hunan Television First Broadcast Viewership (ky.live)
Episodes	Broadcast Date	Viewership	Market Share	Rank	Note
1	22 May 2026	0.6029	3.4620	1	
2	29 May 2026	0.5729	3.4292	1	
3	5 June 2026	0.5757	3.0997	2	
4	12 June 2026	0.6348	3.8953	2	Jiangsu《Melody Roaming Season 3》ended
5	19 June 2026	0.6600	4.0376	2	
6	26 June 2026	0.5897	3.7716	2	
7	3 July 2026	0.5900	3.3727	2	
8	10 July 2026	0.6125	3.7976	2	Zhejiang《Keep Running Season 14》ended
9	17 July 2026	0.6408	4.1120	1	
10	24 July 2026	0.5591	3.7459	1	
11	31 July 2026	0.5749	3.9657	1	
12	7 August 2026				
13	14 August 2026				

1. Major programs airing in the same or overlapping time slots:
  1. Zhejiang Television: 《Keep Running Season 14》
  2. Jiangsu Satellite TV：《Melody Roaming 3》
2. Data provided by Kuyun Digital Entertainment(https://www.ky.live/#/), survey scope includes smart two-way interactive TV viewer.
3. The above viewership rankings do not include CCTV.
4. The rankings are for all variety shows on Friday nights, and not necessarily in the same time slot.
5. 《Singer 2026 Countdown To Start Of Show》is not included in the viewership and rankings.

== Variety Shows Transition ==
Mainland China Hunan Television Every Friday 19:30—22:00
Previous	Singer 2026 (22 May 2026—7 August 2026)	Next
The Inn 2026^{[a]} (Episode 1—Episode 11) (27 February 2026—15 May 2026)	Singer 2026 (22 May 2026—7 August 2026)	
The Inn 2026^{[a]} (Episode 1—Episode 11) (27 February 2026—15 May 2026)	Singer 2026 (22 May 2026—7 August 2026)	Friday Night Fever (Tentative)

Singer Series Transition
Previous	Singer Season 11 (22 May 2026—7 August 2026)	Next
Singer Season 10 (16 May 2025—8 August 2025)	Singer Season 11 (22 May 2026—7 August 2026)	
Singer Season 10 (16 May 2025—8 August 2025)	Singer Season 11 (22 May 2026—7 August 2026)	Pending

- a. From 27 February 2026 to 15 May 2026,《The Inn 2026》will air during prime time every Friday. One episode of《Golden Eagle Exclusive Theater》will air at 19:30, and 《The Inn 2026》will air at 20:10.
