= You Make Me Free Make Me Fly! =

Studio album by A-Mei
- Released: December 29, 1997
- Recorded: 1997
- Genre: Pop
- Length: 50:00 (Disc 1); 21:01 (Disc 2)
- Label: Forward Music
- Producer: Ma Yu-fen; Yu Guangyan; Koji Sakurai

A-Mei chronology
Bad Boy (1997)	You Make Me Free Make Me Fly! (1997)	Holding Hands (1998)

You Make Me Free Make Me Fly! (Chinese: 妹力四射; pinyin: Mèi lì sì shè) is the third studio album by Taiwanese singer A-Mei. It was released on December 29, 1997, by Forward Music. The album was recorded as an in advance listen for A-Mei's 1998 live stadium concert. The record features cover versions of Chinese and English songs, except for the tracks "You Make Me Free" and "I Do Not Mind." You Make Me Free Make Me Fly! has sold 800,000 copies in Taiwan and over 4 million copies throughout Asia to date.

== Background and production ==
On June 7, 1997, A-Mei released her highly anticipated sophomore album Bad Boy. It became an immediate success and went on to become Taiwan's highest selling album of all time, with sales of approximately 1.38 million copies nationwide. Additionally, Bad Boy went on to sell more than six million copies across Asia, establishing A-Mei as a dominant force on the music charts. However, tragedy struck five months after its release date. Her manager and mentor Chang Yu-sheng died on November 12, 1997, at age 31, after falling into a coma for 24 days due to a car crash that occurred on October 20, 1997. Without Chang to be there as her guide, the mainstream media speculated that A-Mei would lose her way and eventually fade into oblivion.

Shortly after Chang's death, A-Mei decided to take a huge leap in her career by formally announcing a solo stadium concert. This announcement broke the record for the shortest time a large-scale concert has been held by a Taiwanese singer since their debut (there was only 1 year and 28 days between the release date of the first album and the date of the concert). However, her first two records didn't have enough songs for a three hour live show. To pan out the songbook, Forward Music hurriedly released You Make Me Free Make Me Fly! which contained covers of both English and Mandarin songs; with the exception of two original numbers ("You Make Me Free" and "I Do Not Mind").

== Live performances ==
On January 10, 1998, A-Mei held her first large-scale ticketed concert titled A-Mei Live in Concert 1998. It became the fastest-selling concert in Taiwan in the past 10 years and had a very fanatic audience, with both shows at the Taipei Municipal Stadium and Central Park Kaohsiung being full houses. On March 21 and 22, she held two ticketed concerts at Hong Kong Coliseum, which won the hearts of Hong Kongese fans. The two Hong Kong concerts were sold out within 8 hours after tickets going on sale, breaking the fastest ticket selling record in Hong Kong at the time. The 2 shows at the Singapore Indoor Stadium also set a number of records, including the record for the fastest sold-out concert: the first show was sold out within 10 hours while the second was sold out within 8 hours. Along with her gobsmacking vocals, her charismatic and infectious stage performances became her trademark, and further cemented A-Mei's status as the top diva in Chinese pop music. In all, the concert tour drew in about 100,000 spectators.

== Track listing ==
CD1
No.	Title	Lyrics	Music	Original artist	Length
1.	"Sky Blue Every Day" (天天天藍)	Zhuo Yiyu	Chen Liou	Michelle Pan	4:16
2.	"Standing On A High Hill" (站在高崗上)	Situ Ming	Yao Min	Yao Lee	5:24
3.	"Don't Say Goodbye" (不要告別)	Sanmao	Li Tai-hsiang	Li Jinling	4:50
4.	"Love Song 1990" (戀曲 1990)	Lo Ta-yu	Lo Ta-yu	Lo Ta-yu	5:01
5.	"You Make Me Free"	Yang Lide	Chen Chih-yuan		5:29
6.	"Days Without Smoking" (沒有煙抽的日子)	Wang Dan	Chang Yu-sheng	Chang Yu-sheng	5:16
7.	"Crying Sand" (哭砂)	Eric Lin	Xiong Meiling	Tracy Huang	6:08
8.	"Follow Your Feelings" (跟著感覺走)	Chia-Li Chen	Chen Chih-yuan	Su Rui	4:51
9.	"I Do Not Mind" (我無所謂)	Eric Lin	Michael Tu		4:59
10.	"Hotline You And Me" (熱線你和我)	Lee Shou-chuan	Lee Shou-chuan	Liu Wen-cheng	3:46
Total length:					50:00

CD2
No.	Title	Lyrics	Music	Original artist	Length
1.	"I Don't Want to Talk About It"	Danny Whitten	Danny Whitten	Rod Stewart	6:00
2.	"What's Up?"	Linda Perry	Linda Perry	4 Non Blondes	5:21
3.	"The Power Of Love"	Gunther Mende, Candy DeRouge, Jennifer Rush, Mary Susan Applegate	Gunther Mende, Candy DeRouge, Jennifer Rush, Mary Susan Applegate	Jennifer Rush	6:03
4.	"Walking By Myself"	Jimmy Rogers	Jimmy Rogers	Gary Moore	3:37
Total length:					21:01

== Charts ==
Chart (1998)	Peak position
Taiwanese Albums (IFPI Taiwan)	3

== Sales ==
Region	Certification	Certified units/sales
Taiwan	—	800,000
Summaries
Asia	—	4,000,000
