= Can I Hug You, Lover? =

1999 studio album by A-Mei

Studio album by A-Mei
- Released: June 8, 1999
- Genre: Pop
- Length: 53:52
- Label: Forward Music
- Producer: David Tao; Ma Yu-fen; Yu Guang-yan; Martin Tang; Tong Kong; Yiu-Chuen Chan; Bing Wang; Bulang Yukan

A-Mei chronology
Feel (1999)	Can I Hug You, Lover? (1999)	A-Mei New Century Collection (1999)

Alternative cover

Can I Hug You, Lover? (Chinese: 我可以抱你嗎？愛人; pinyin: Wǒ kěyǐ bào nǐ ma? Àirén) is the fifth studio album by Taiwanese singer A-Mei. It was released throughout Greater China on June 8, 1999, by Forward Music. There are 12 songs on the album in total, which are produced by musicians such as David Tao, Ma Yu-fen and Yu Guangyan. The album itself incorporates popular musical genres such as pop, pop rock, R&B, and surf rock.

Commercially, Can I Hug You, Lover? was a huge success in Asia. The album sold over 500,000 copies in Taiwan within a week of its release and has since amassed sales of 1.18 million copies nationwide. The final sales statistics across Asia exceeded 8 million copies, making it the highest-selling album by A-Mei overall. She performed most of the songs featured in Can I Hug You, Lover? on her Mei Li 99 concert tour in summer 1999, which became the most successful tour by a Mandopop singer up to that point.

== Background and production ==
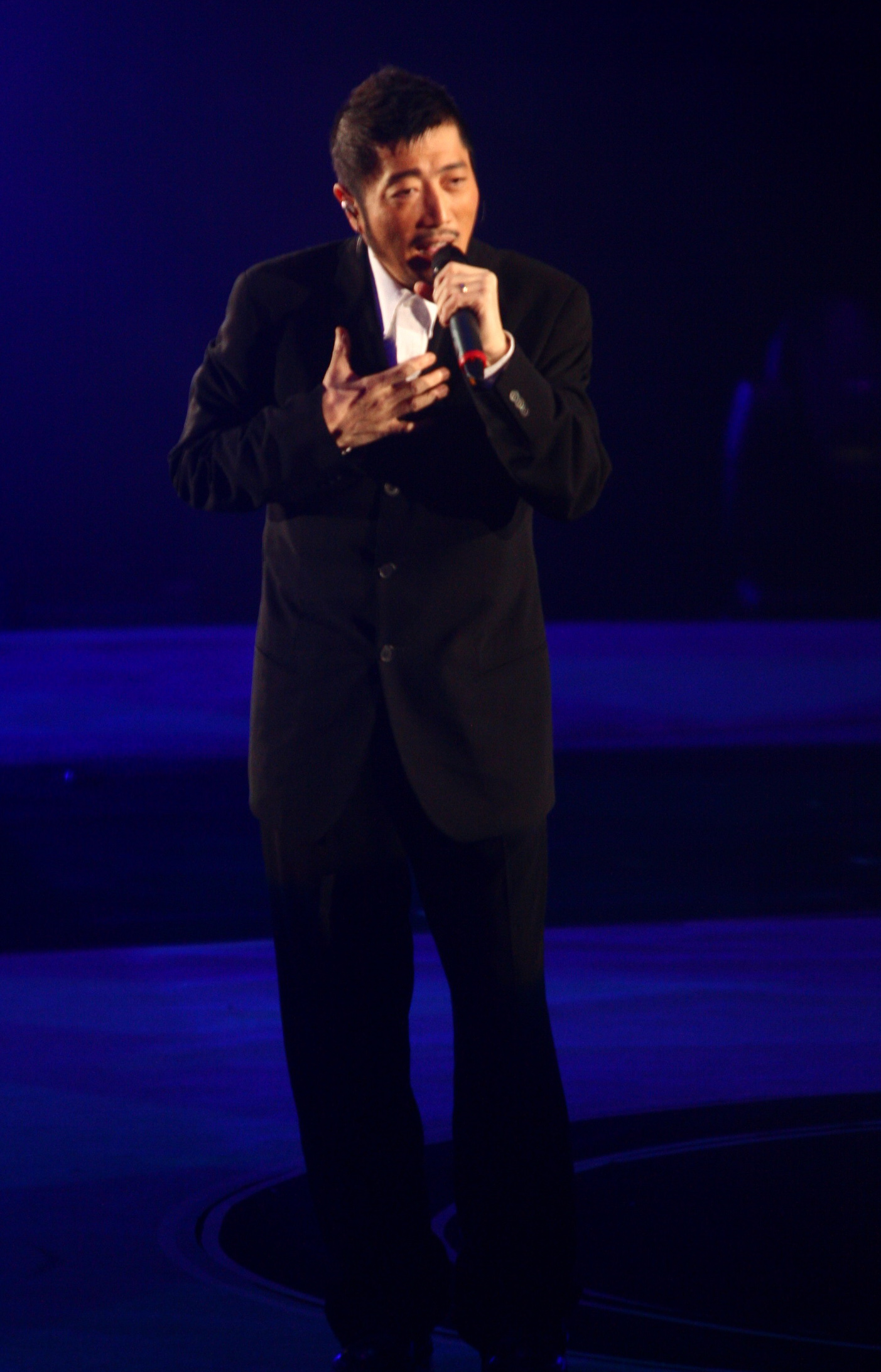
Johnny Chen, one of A-Mei's collaborators on the album

Can I Hug You? Lover is an album tailor-made for A-Mei by a number of music producers, with its production team including musicians such as David Tao, Ma Yu-fen, and Yu Guang-yan. It also features first-time collaborators Johnny Chen and Chen Yaochuan. The album contains 12 songs in all. The lead single "Can I Hug You" was customized by Johnny Chen for A-Mei's voice. With his customized sound, from songwriting to production, Chen boldly gave A-Mei the mellow, lyrical track.

The song "When I Secretly Started Thinking of You" was composed by her late mentor Chang Yu-sheng. "Don't Rub Salt in the Wound" was composed by Guo Tzu with lyrics filled in by Wu Yukang, conveying the values of love in the new century, and it is also the theme song of the TV series Gentleman's Orchid Flower. "Three Days and Three Nights" is a fast-paced song by Chen Zhihan, which follows her 1998 hit "Holding Hands," targeting A-Mei's wide range of voice power.

Among them, the Japanese song "Want to See You So Much," was the first Japanese-language song A-Mei ever included on an album. The song was dedicated by bassist Funami Yukan to his wife, Chui Shan Kan, who was studying in Japan, and responded by writing lyrics in Japanese. Their close friend Yu Guangyan wrote "Don't Care About Him" with Chinese lyrics of the same song.

The album Can I Hug You, Lover? is a more musical and forward-looking piece of music that subverts the listener's visual habits and allows everyone to see A-Mei's different vocal expressions. In the album, A-Mei sings poignant love songs, and the helplessness of a woman's love-destroyed heart when it is broken to the point of being riddled with holes allows her to sing in vivid detail. Compared with the previous albums that featured hot and fast songs, Can I Hug You, Lover? has more or less undergone some changes. The album's self-titled work, "Can I Hug You," and its seventh track, "Don't Rub Salt in the Wound," transformed A-Mei, who had always been a hot shot on stage, into a fragile woman wounded by love, standing alone with a black umbrella on a continuous rainy day, and singing a sad song in the middle of the pouring rain. At the same time, she did not give up the upbeat songs that she had always been known for performing, and sang "Give Me Feelings" as the new spokesperson of a soft drink brand, continuing the familiar path that she always followed.

== Writing and recording ==
"Can I Hug You" is completely different from her more cathartic and impassioned approach to love songs in the past. With her quiet and introspective vocals, A-Mei interprets a seemingly cold, but deeply felt emotion, demonstrating a very different lyrical style. The song is a melancholic love song that describes the feeling of leaving, with her voice, A-Mei interprets the mature female sentiment of saying goodbye with tenderness, which is difficult to part with, in a way that touches the hearts of the people. The song "When I Secretly Started Thinking of You" has the rock elements and straightforward poetic text that Chang Yu-sheng is known for, coupled with A-Mei's explosive raspy voice, pretending to be spontaneous when she falls in love, and full of unwillingness when she is reserved.

When A-Mei interpreted the song "Don't Rub Salt in the Wound" with her personalized singing style, it is very close to the mood of modern metropolitan men and women. "Three Days and Three Nights" is a kinetic surf rock song with a lot of passion. Furthermore, David Tao's song "Love, What’s Rare?," which he composed for A-Mei, unfolds his creative prowess in the area of rock. "No Regrets" is a song with a more synthesizer heavy arrangement that opens with a softer delivery. "Goodnight, Goodbye" is dark pop tune with Latin-elements. "Run Away From Love" is a power ballad that contains a R&B-influenced pre-chorus. "Give Me Feelings" is a bubblegum pop song. "Sunrise" is a sunshine pop song that has brighter energy to it, which ties it in with “Give Me Feelings,” but it has a more laid back arrangement.

== Release and promotion ==
The standard edition features one CD, which contain twelve songs in total. The standard edition came in two possible album covers; the first being a shot of A-Mei standing in the rain with a black umbrella and the second being a photo of A-Mei in a minidress while posing in front of a white and yellow background. A cassette version of the album was also released by Forward Music.

=== Singles and music videos ===
The songs "Give Me Feelings" and "Sunrise" were both originally released on the extended play Feel in April 1999. Both songs were used as advertising jingles for Sprite in China. The music video for "Give Me Feelings" was directed by Shao Yuanzhi. The music videos for both the songs carry identical storylines from their respective commercials. The first Sprite commercial features "Give Me Feelings"; in the first commercial A-Mei leads a throng of young people in a celebration of song and dance in the streets. She then runs into beauty parlors and restaurants, where she pulls off bystanders' masks off and invites them to join in the revelry. The second commercial that features "Sunrise" shows A-Mei dancing with her dancers in a dance studio, driving four-wheel ATVs on the beach with her friends, playing basketball in an outside basketball court with a bunch of children and eating seafood and drinking Sprite at a house party; with the final shot of the commercial showing A-Mei asleep on a chair with a puppy in her arm. The first commercial was filmed in Shanghai on the afternoon of January 19, 1999, which resulted in serious traffic jams around the shooting site.

The music video for "Can I Hug You" was directed by Ma Yizhong. The music video invited director Ma Yizhong to shoot the story of a woman's heart with the same feeling of a woman. This is the first time that A-Mei has worked with a female director, and the first time that she has had a meeting before shooting the music video, and she knew the scene and content beforehand. The director used both unreal and real scenes, and created a downpour indoors to show the collapse of a woman's inner heart, which is wet, icy, and cold. In addition, two to three hundred men's suits were used to create a space for A-Mei to be trapped in. The music video for "When I Secretly Started Thinking of You" was directed by Lai Weikang. The music video for "Love, What’s Rare?" was directed by Yu Yongjie. The music video for "Want to See You So Much" along with its Chinese version "Don’t Care About Him" were directed by Lai Weikang, who also directed the video for "No Regrets."

The video for "Don't Rub Salt in the Wound" was directed by Kuang Sheng, and depicts A-Mei singing in a room with an orchestra. The music video for "Three Days, Three Nights" was directed by Wǔ Dù Cíchǎng. The video depicts A-Mei playing the guitar, singing and dancing vehemently in an abandoned building, a bar and on a roadside. The music video for "Run Away From Love" was directed by Yuan Xuhu. In January 2000, the tracks "Can I Hug You" and "Give Me Feelings" were listed at number 11 and number 66 respectively on the 1999 Hit FM Top 100 Singles of the Year chart.

=== Touring ===
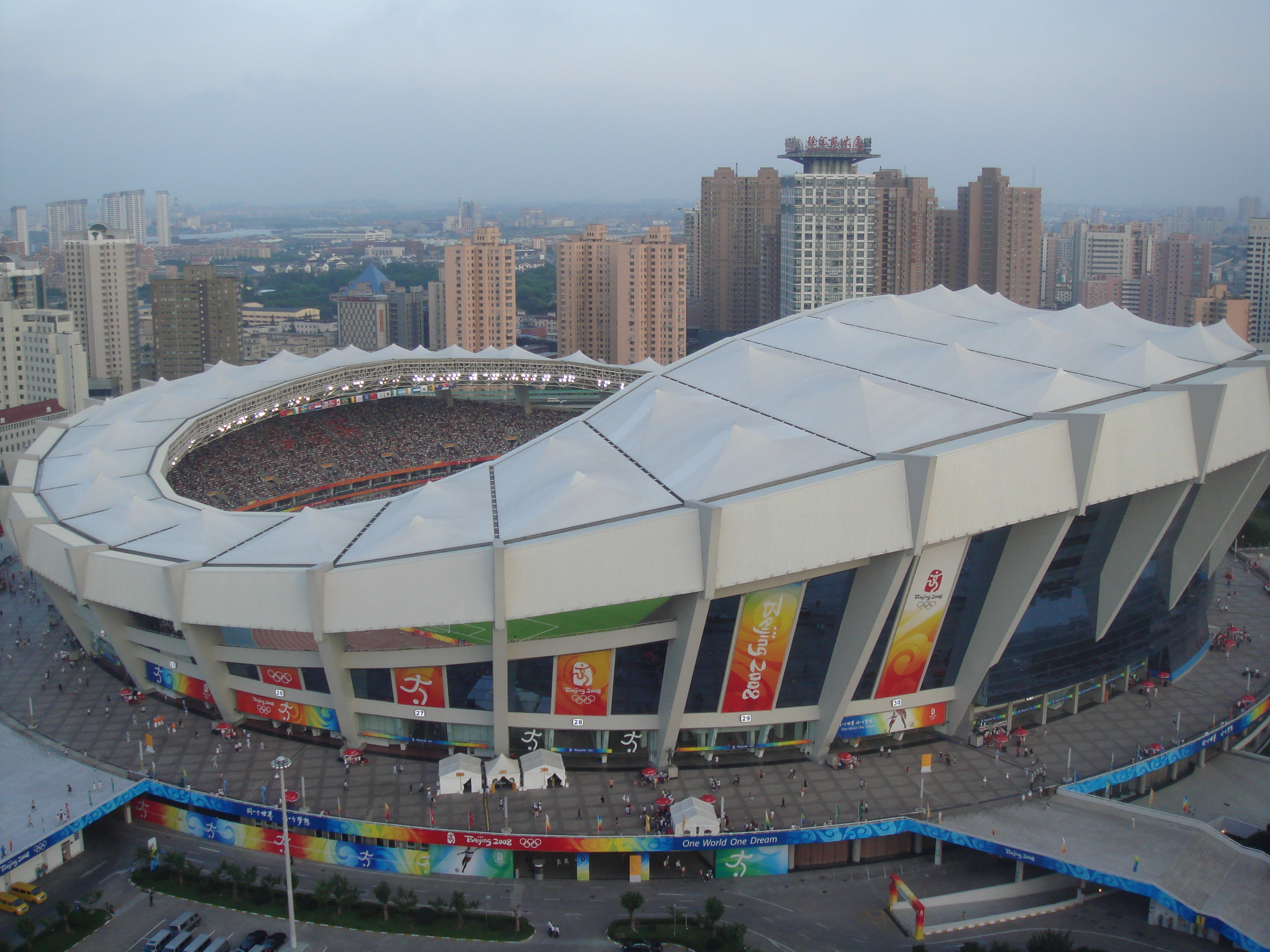
A-Mei's concert at the Shanghai Stadium, which was held on August 13, 1999, became the most successful concert in that city's history

In the summer of 1999, A-Mei held her second Asia-wide concert tour, Mei Li 99, which visited various cities in Taiwan and other Asian cities, including Hong Kong, Singapore, Beijing and Shanghai. On August 6, 1999, she became the first artist to perform a concert at Beijing's Workers' Stadium. With more than 60,000 tickets sold, she broke the record for the highest number of spectators for a single performance in the city. She became the first Taiwanese singer to perform at the Shanghai Stadium, with the seats at the venue filled to the brim. It is notable that there were nearly 80,000 attendees attending the live show in Shanghai on August 13, 1999, which made it the most successful concert in that city's history. More than 50,000 people poured into the two concerts at Hong Kong's now defunct Kai Tak Airport, making her the first and last Taiwanese singer to hold two ticketed concerts there. At the Taipei Municipal Stadium, she became the only female singer to "open the entire venue" to a crowd of nearly 50,000 people, thus being regarded as a major benchmark in Taiwan's concert history. A-Mei was also the first to perform in Taitung County by holding a large-scale ticketed concert at the Taitung County Stadium that attracted tens of thousands of people. In Singapore, she also became the first act to perform at the Singapore National Stadium; all the 35,000 tickets at that concert, which was held on September 25, 1999, sold out completely. The Mei Li 99 tour held 14-concerts and attracted about 500,000 spectators, all told.

== Accolades ==
The album earned A-Mei a nomination for Best Female Singer at the 11th Golden Melody Awards. "Give Me Feelings" was one of the winning songs of the 6th Chinese Music Chart at the 6th China Music Awards, which was held by Channel V.

== Track listing ==
Can I Hug You, Lover? track listing
No.	Title	Lyrics	Music	Arrangement	Length
1.	"Can I Hug You" (我可以抱你嗎)	Johnny "Bug" Chen	Johnny "Bug" Chen	Jiang Jianmin	4:56
2.	"當我開始偷偷地想你" (When I Secretly Started Thinking of You)	Chang Yu-sheng	Chang Yu-sheng	Martin Tang	4:07
3.	"愛 什麼稀罕" (Love, What’s Rare?)	Fan Zhongfen	David Tao	Bing Wang	4:02
4.	"会いたい (好想見你)" (Want to See You So Much)	Jian Cuishan; Yu Guangyan	Funami Yukan	Funami Yukan	4:36
5.	"無悔" (No Regrets)	Chen Chih-yuan	Arys Chien	Arys Chien	5:13
6.	"Goodnight, Goodbye"	Wu Yukang	Guo Tzu	Martin Tang	3:55
7.	"別在傷口灑鹽" (Don't Rub Salt in the Wound)	Wu Yukang	Guo Tzu	Wang Yumin	5:10
8.	"三天三夜" (Three Days, Three Nights)	Chen Zhihan	Chen Zhihan	Martin Tang	4:29
9.	"離愛出走" (Run Away From Love)	Daryl Yao	Chen Yaochuan	Wang Jikang	4:13
10.	"給我感覺" (Give Me Feelings)	Wu Yukang; Chen Zhihan	Chen Chih-yuan	Martin Tang	4:13
11.	"不在乎他" (Don’t Care About Him)	Jian Cuishan; Yu Guangyan	Funami Yukan	Li Bojie	4:37
12.	"日出" (Sunrise)	Tong Kong	Tong Kong	Tong Kong	4:16
Total length:					53:52

== Charts ==
Chart (1999)	Peak position
Hong Kong Albums (IFPI)	5
Taiwanese Albums (IFPI Taiwan)	1

== Sales and certifications ==
Region	Certification	Certified units/sales
Taiwan	—	1,180,000
Summaries
Asia	—	8,000,000
