= Singer Season 10 =

Season of Chinese television series

Singer
- Season 10
- Hosted by: He Jiong (Main Rounds, Breakout Round, Final); Cannon Hu（Main Rounds except the eighth round, Breakout Round, Final） Shan Yichun（Breakout Round）
- Judges: 500 on-site audience + hundreds international online audience
- Winner: Chen Chusheng
- Runner-up: Mickey Guyton
- Finals venue: Hunan Broadcasting System
- No. of episodes: 13

Release
- Original network: Hunan Television
- Original release: May 16 – August 8, 2025

Season chronology
- ← Previous; Season 9 （2024） Next → Season 11 (2026)

The tenth season of Chinese television series Singer (Chinese: 歌手; previously titled I Am a Singer), a Friday prime time music reality show , was broadcast on Hunan Television and Mango TV between May and August 2025. Singer 2025 is still produced by Zhang Danyang, who is part of the team of Hong Xiao and its music director is Taiwanese senior musician George Chen Chien Chi. The season premiere was broadcast live on May 16, 2025 at HBS production base (commonly known as the seven colourful boxes) in Changsha, the capital city of Hunan province, and this was the fourth season to feature returning contestants, after season five, season eight and season nine. In this season, the competition rules are similar to season nine, except for the normal rounds and the eleventh round. The season premiered on 16 May 2025, and will end on 8 August 2025.

Singer 2025 continues to gather famous singers of Greater China and other regions to participate. It has a total of 24 participating singers.

In the evening of 8 August 2025, Singer 2025, which lasted for more than three months, came to an end. In the end, Chen Chusheng defeated other participating singers and is honoured as the winner of Singer 2025, Mickey Guyton received the first runner-up, and Shan Yichun received the second runner-up.

== Results ==
Safe	First	Bottom	Eliminated	Performing Guest	Foreign Challenger	Rising Challenger; Comeback Challenger	Challenge Success	Challenge Failure	Breakout Success	Breakout Failure	Winner	Other Rank	Absent	Withdrawal

	Singer	Air Date （2025）														
	Singer	16 May	23 May	30 May	6 June	13 June	20 June	27 June	4 July	11 July	18 July	25 July	1 August	8 August		
	Singer	1st Round			2nd Round			3rd Round			4th Round		Breakout Round	Final Round		
	Singer	Normal Round	Rising Singers Challenge Round	Foreign Guest Challenge Round	Normal Round	Rising Singers Challenge Round	Foreign Guest Challenge Round	Normal Round	Rising Singers Challenge Round	Foreign Guest Challenge Round	Normal Round	Rising Singers Challenge Round	Breakout Round	1st Round	2nd Round	Overall
1	S7 Chen Chusheng	2	3	5	3	4	1	2	2	3	4	4	—	3	1	1
2	Mickey Guyton	3	5	3	4	6	2	1	1	5	5	5	—	1	4	2
3	Shan Yichun	1	1	2	2	3	5	4	3	2	6	1	—	2	6	3
4	S3 Jess Lee	—	—	—	—	—	—	—	—	4	3	2	—	6	2	4
5	Beni Arashiro	8	—	—	—	—	—	—	—	—	—	—	—	4	5	5
6	Grace Kinstler	6	2	1	1	2	3	3	4	7	—	—	—	5	7	6
7	S3 A-Lin	—	—	—	—	—	—	—	—	—	1	3	—	7	3	7
8	Alexia Evellyn	—	—	—	—	—	—	—	—	1	2	6	—	—	—	—
9	S1 S5 Terry Lin	7	6	—	—	—	—	—	—	—	—	7	—	—	—	—
10	Zhe Lai Nu	—	—	—	—	—	6	7	7	—	—	—	—	—	—	—
11	Janice Vidal	—	—	—	5	7	—	—	—	—	—	—	—	—	—	—
12	S8 Pax Congo	5	7	7	—	—	—	—	—	—	—	—	—	—	—	—
13	S6 GAI Zhou Yan	4	4	4	7	1	4	5	5	6	7	—	—	—	—	—
14	RadioMars	—	—	—	—	—	—	6	6	—	—	—	—	—	—	—
15	Ma Jiaqi	—	—	6	6	5	7	—	—	—	—	—	—	—	—	—
16	Christine Fan	—	—	—	8	—	—	—	—	—	—	—	—	—	—	—
17	Joyce Cheng	—	—	—	—	—	—	—	—	—	—	—	—	—	—	—
18	Yun Fei	—	—	—	—	—	—	—	—	—	—	—	—	—	—	—
19	S1Cannon Hu	—	—	—	—	—	—	—	—	—	—	—	—	—	—	—
20	Sean Tang	—	—	—	—	—	—	—	—	—	—	—	—	—	—	—
21	S7Ayanga	—	—	—	—	—	—	—	—	—	—	—	—	—	—	—
22	Jordan Smith	—	—	—	—	—	—	—	—	check	—	—	—	—	—	—
23	Michael Bublé	—	—	—	—	—	check	—	—	—	—	—	—	—	—	—
24	S9 Charlie Puth	—	—	check	—	—	—	—	—	—	—	—	—	—	—	—
