= All This to Say I Love You Tour =

2025 concert tour by Elliot James Reay

All This To Say I Love You Tour
- Tour by Elliot James Reay
- Promotional poster
- Location: Manchester; Birmingham; Bristol; London
- Start date: 6 July 2025
- End date: 11 July 2025
- No. of shows: 4

The All This to Say I Love You UK Tour was the debut headlining concert tour by English singer and songwriter Elliot James Reay, held in July 2025 to support the release of his debut EP of the same name in June 2025. The tour ran through early to mid-July with sold-out shows in Manchester, Birmingham, Bristol and London. Aimee Fatale performed as the supporting act.

== Tour dates and venues ==
The tour included:

- Manchester – Gorilla, July 6, 2025
- Birmingham – O2 Academy 3, July 8, 2025
- Bristol – The Louisiana, July 10, 2025
- London – Omeara, July 11, 2025

At the venue in Manchester, Reay arrived in a vintage car, which was bought two days before the tour started.

== Setlist and performance style ==
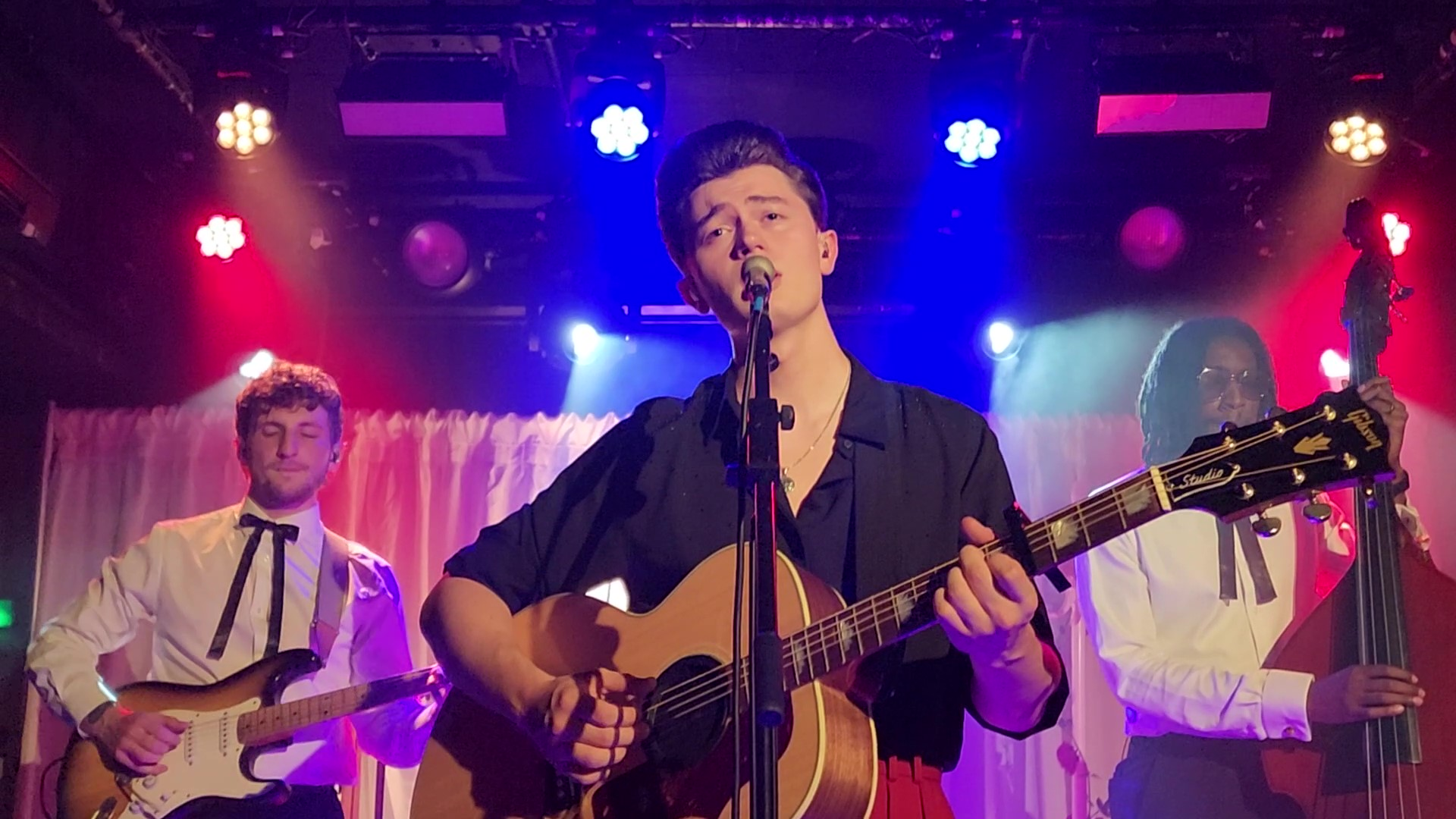
Reay in London, July 2025

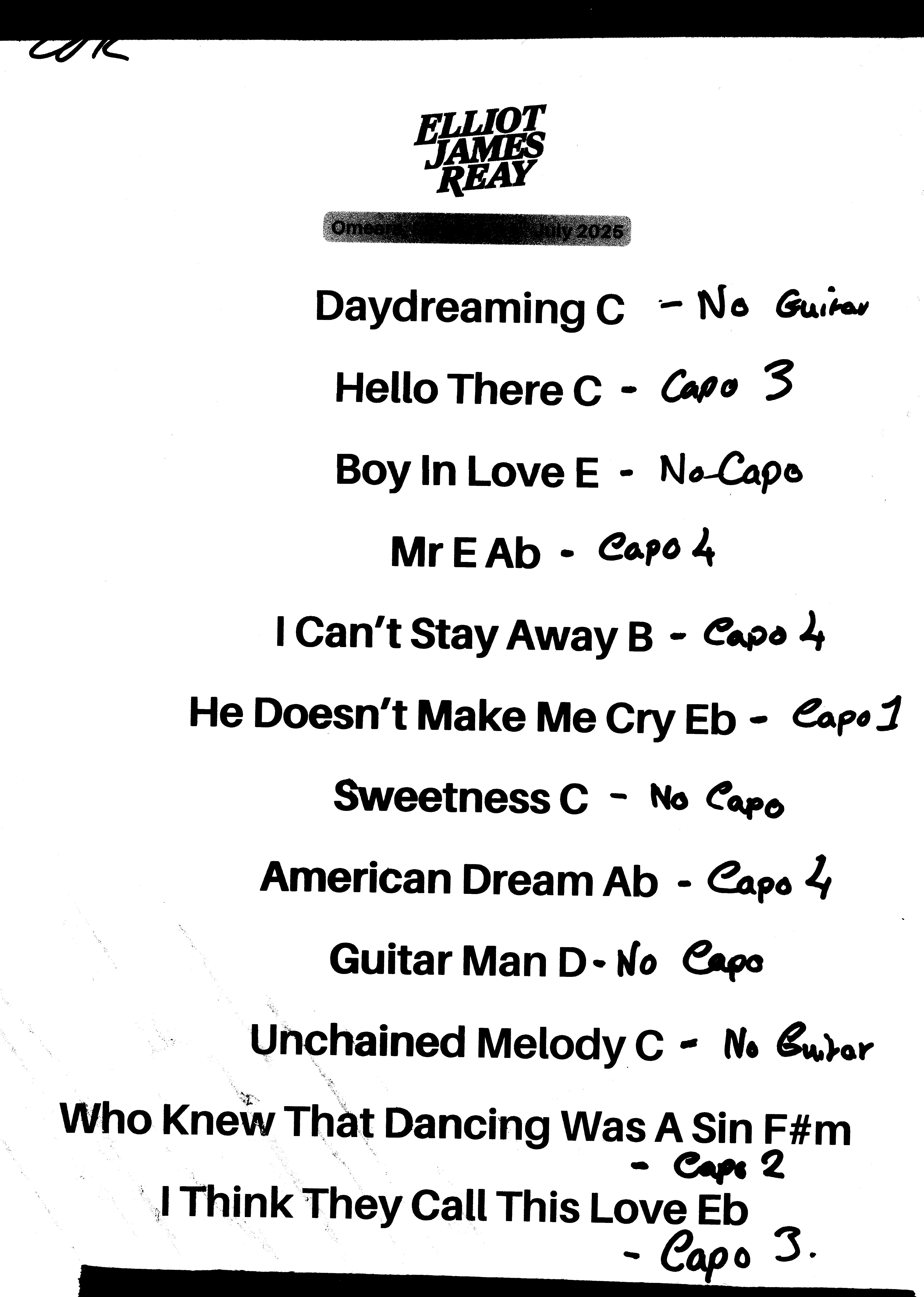
Setlist used on stage in London

All shows featured the same setlist, blending released songs with unreleased songs and covers:

1. Daydreaming - from debut EP
2. Hello There - unreleased
3. Boy in Love - from debut EP
4. Mr E - unreleased
5. I Can’t Stay Away - from debut EP
6. He Doesn’t Make Me Cry - unreleased
7. Sweetness - from debut EP
8. American Dream - unreleased
9. Guitar Man - cover
10. Unchained Melody - cover
11. Who Knew Dancing Was a Sin - from debut EP
12. I Think They Call This Love - from debut EP

Reay was accompanied on stage by Harry Howell on guitar, and Caleb Wilson on an upright acoustic bass. No backing tracks were used.

The stage was modeled as a living room, with an armchair, a lamp, vinyl records (Elvis Presley, The Everly Brothers, among others), a rotary dial telephone, and artificial roses which Reay gave to audience members during and after the shows.

== Critical reception ==
All concerts were sold out. Reviews are unanimously positive. According to reviews, Reay energized and engaged tour concert audiences that were made up of "all ages and backgrounds", with a sound that is "new to younger generations and nostalgic to older audiences", appealing to all.

A review of the show in Manchester by Adrenaline describes Reay's rendition of Unchained Melody as superbly controlled and loved by the crowd. A review of the same show by Northern Exposure refers to Reay's vocal prowess and his ability to connect with the musical heritage of the 1950s and 1960s, "drawing in fans with every note and lyric, creating an atmosphere that feels both nostalgic and refreshingly modern".

The venue in London is described by Rodeo as "cozy, quaint and warm," with fans transported to a bygone era by Reay’s vintage style and showmanship: “from the initial first note … the screams were deafening,” likened to a “prom scene in Grease”.

Reay's performance on stage is further described as "high on musicality with a respectful 50s vibe", captivating, and charismatic, with his voice called phenomenal, "like caramel", and likened to that of an angel.
