= Elliot James Reay =

English singer and songwriter (born 31 January 2002)

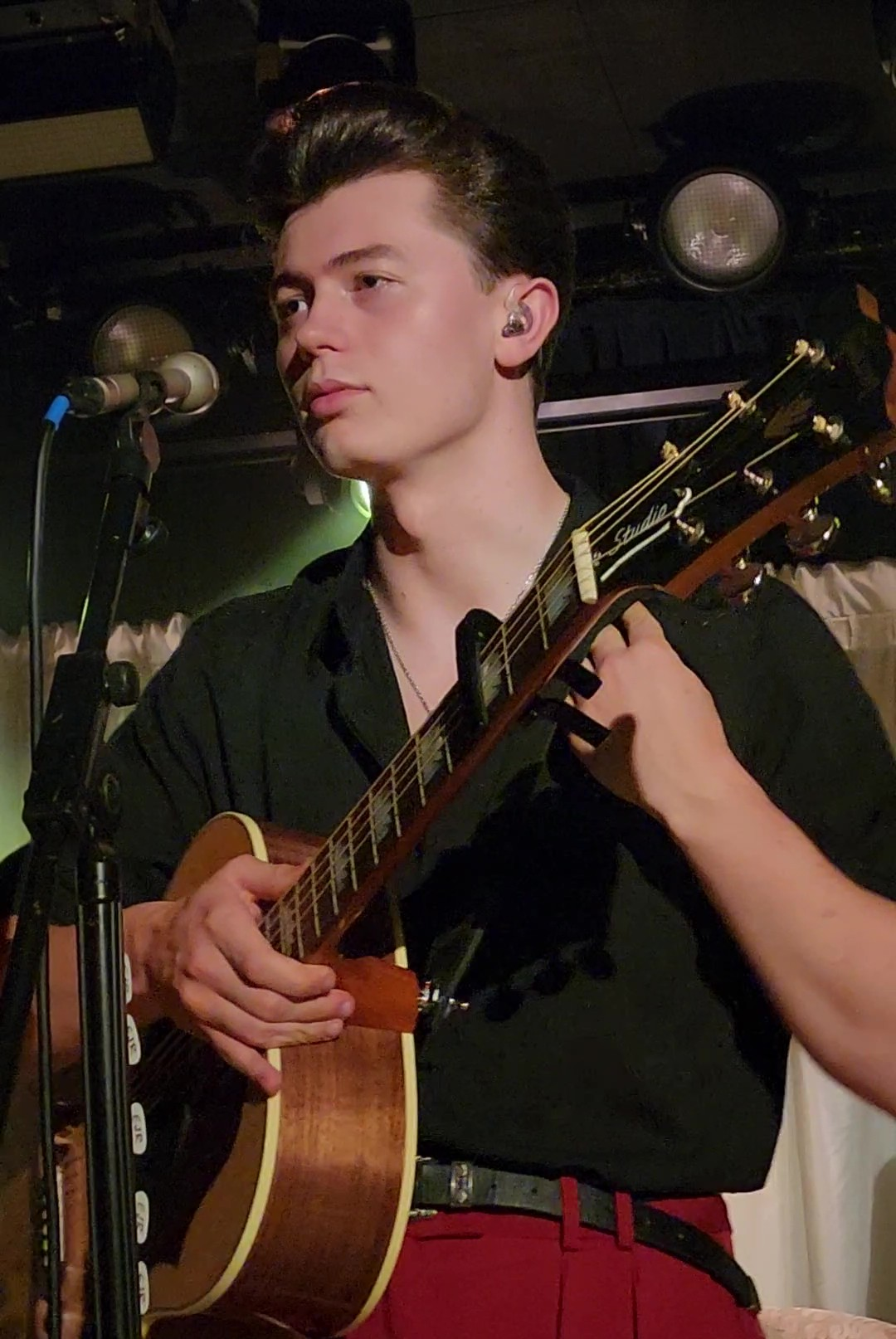
- Reay in London on July 11, 2025
- Born: January 31, 2002 (age 24); Bury, Greater Manchester
- Occupations: Singer; songwriter
- Musical career
- Genres: Rock and roll; rockabilly; pop; blues
- Instruments: Vocals; guitar
- Labels: Interscope Records; EMI Records
- Website: www.elliotjamesreay.com

Signature
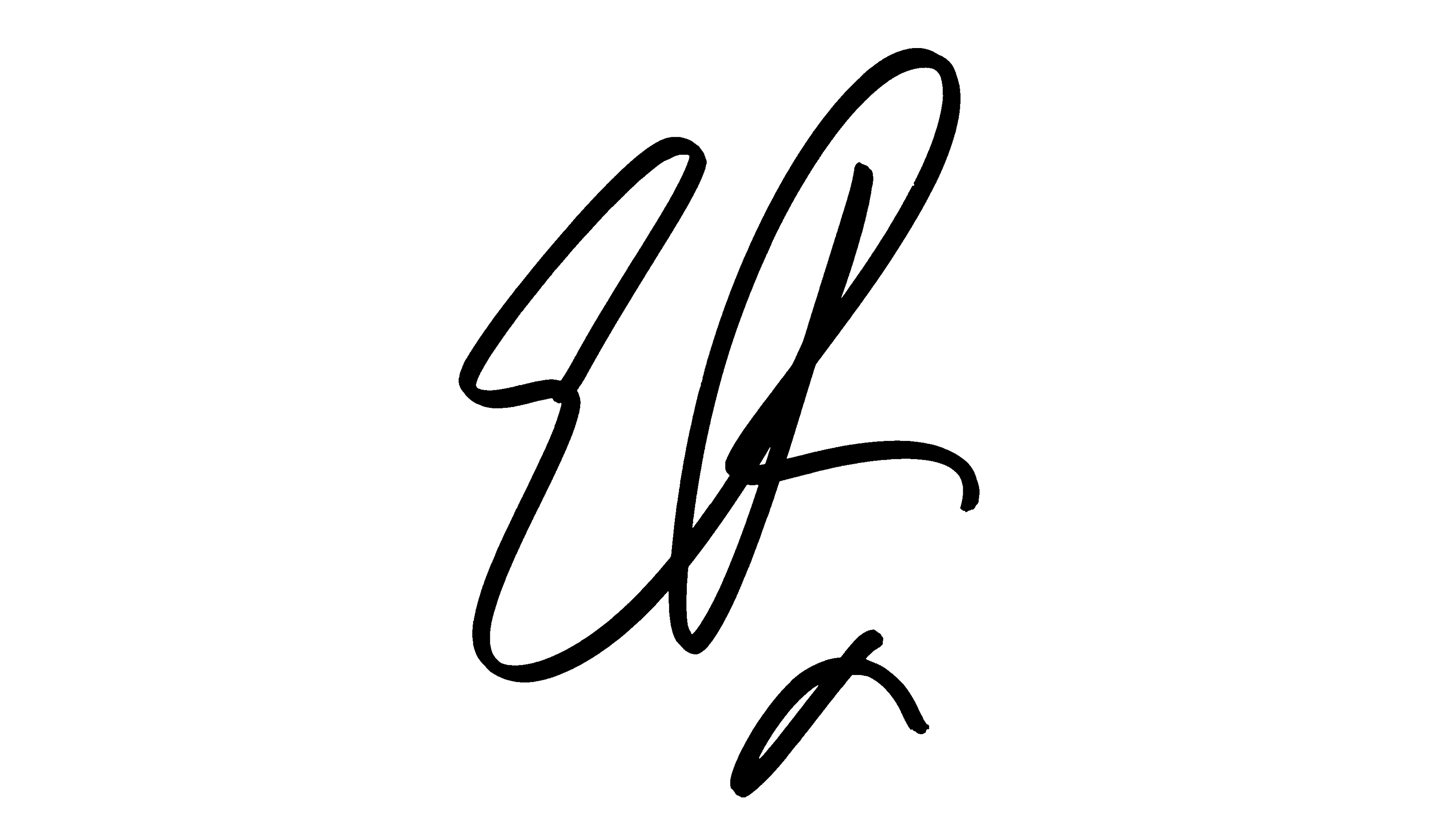

Elliot James Reay (born January 31, 2002) is an English singer-songwriter. His music bridges the gap between 1950s rock 'n' roll and modern audiences. Reay released his debut single I Think They Call This Love in July 2024 and his debut EP All This To Say I Love You in June 2025. His covers of nostalgic songs, particularly those by Elvis Presley and Roy Orbison, have attracted millions of views on social media.

== Early life ==
Elliot James Reay was born and raised in Bury, Greater Manchester. He attended Woodhey High School. Reay's grandfather lived in the Philippines for a decade, and Reay spent time there as a child.

== Career ==
=== Busking, kitchen videos, and covers ===
Reay started out busking in the streets of his hometown, Bury, and later in Melbourne, singing covers of classical rock-and-roll songs from Elvis Presley, Billy Fury, Roy Orbison, among others. According to Reay, he thrived on market day "when all the elderly folks would come by and I got to sing my old stuff". At age 15, Reay raised over £2000 in a day for a charity set up in the wake of the Manchester Arena Bombing through busking and singing "If I Can Dream".

In July 2019, at age 17, Reay posted his first cover of an Elvis Presley song, Love Me, on his YouTube channel. After encouragement from a friend to put more of his "real self" online, Reay posted a TikTok video of himself buttering toast while singing the song "My Way" in April 2023. Reay has since posted more than ninety "kitchen-sink videos" in which he sings in an apartment setting as he goes about everyday tasks such as making instant coffee, cleaning, or combing his hair, and an additional 25 covers on his YouTube channel.

Reay has over 6 million followers on social media, including 4 million followers on TikTok, 1 million on Instagram, over 900,000 on YouTube, and over 200,000 followers on Facebook. Two videos of Reay performing "Devil in Disguise" by Elvis Presley and "Thinking Out Loud" by Ed Sheeran have collectively received over 58 million views on TikTok.

=== 2024–present: All This To Say I Love You ===
Reay released his debut single, "I Think They Call This Love", in July 2024. The song features a nostalgic style reminiscent of classic malt shop music, beginning with the lines They say you know when you know / So let's face it, you had me at 'Hello.' The single received over 10 million views prior to its full release in July, and over 30 million streams since. It was on Spotify's Viral charts in 27+ countries, reaching No. 4 on the Global Viral 50. In March 2025, Reay's debut single won the "Road to Memphis" competition, where it was chosen from over 33,000 international entries.

After the independent release of his debut single, Reay signed with Interscope Records and EMI Records, and released his second single, "Boy in Love", in November 2024. It has an upbeat and rock n’ roll tone, with the corresponding music video depicting Reay stepping out of an American 50s car to walk through autumnal Manchester. In "Boy in Love", Reay pays homage to Sam Cooke with the line But, now, when Sam Cooke sings, she got me whistling along. The opening chord of "Boy in Love" is similar to the Everly Brothers' classic "All I Have to Do Is Dream" (1958). Reay has described these subtle nods to his musical influences as "little Easter eggs to people who get it".

Reay's third single, "Daydreaming", released in March 2025, is reminiscent of Roy Orbison in style. It is a nostalgic retro-pop track about longing, blending ’50s–’60s rock 'n' roll with sweeping orchestral, guitar, and brass sounds. The accompanying visualizer shows Reay lost in thought, matching the feeling of drifting into memories, expressed in the lyrics when I miss you, close my eyes and I drift away. The song features actual bird chirps that are meant to add to the reverie-like feel. Reay's fans are called "Reaydreamers", a portmanteau of Reay's last name and his single "Daydreaming".

"Who Knew Dancing Was A Sin", Reay's fourth single (May 2025), uses the humorous premise of a partner suspecting infidelity due to late-night dancing to explore the passion and energy of Northern soul. The song includes groovy basslines, call-and-response vocals and saxophone, and the music video features Reay dancing among Northern soul dancers. In "Who Knew Dancing Was A Sin", Reay pays homage to Jackie Wilson with the lines Oh, 'cause it's too much of a risk/To tell her who my Jackie is, and a Wilson record is shown in the cinematic music video.

Reay released his debut extended play (EP) All This to Say I Love You on June 27, 2025. In addition to the four singles above, it includes two love songs "Sweetness" and "I Can't Stay Away". Along with the release of the EP, Reay issued a Technicolor-styled music video for "Sweetness" directed by Nikko Lamere. Reay subsequently embarked on a sold out UK tour to support the release of his debut EP.

Reay was an opening act to American singer-songwriter Benson Boone's American Heart World Tour, opening for the first half of the North American leg and for the UK and European leg of the tour.

In 2026, Reay appeared a contestant on the eleventh season of Singer, a Chinese singing competition show for well-known professional singers worldwide. He reached the final of the season and finished in seventh place.

== Style ==
Reay's music is rooted in the sound, style, and sentiment of 1950s and 1960s music—both in how it sounds and how it's presented. Reay has cited several artists as his inspirations, including Roy Orbison, Elvis Presley, Eddie Cochran, Buddy Holly, Ritchie Valens, and Billy Fury. Reay's songs often feature vintage chord progressions common in early rock 'n' roll, vocals reminiscent of 50s crooners, and live instrumentation like guitar, real drums, tambourine and horns.

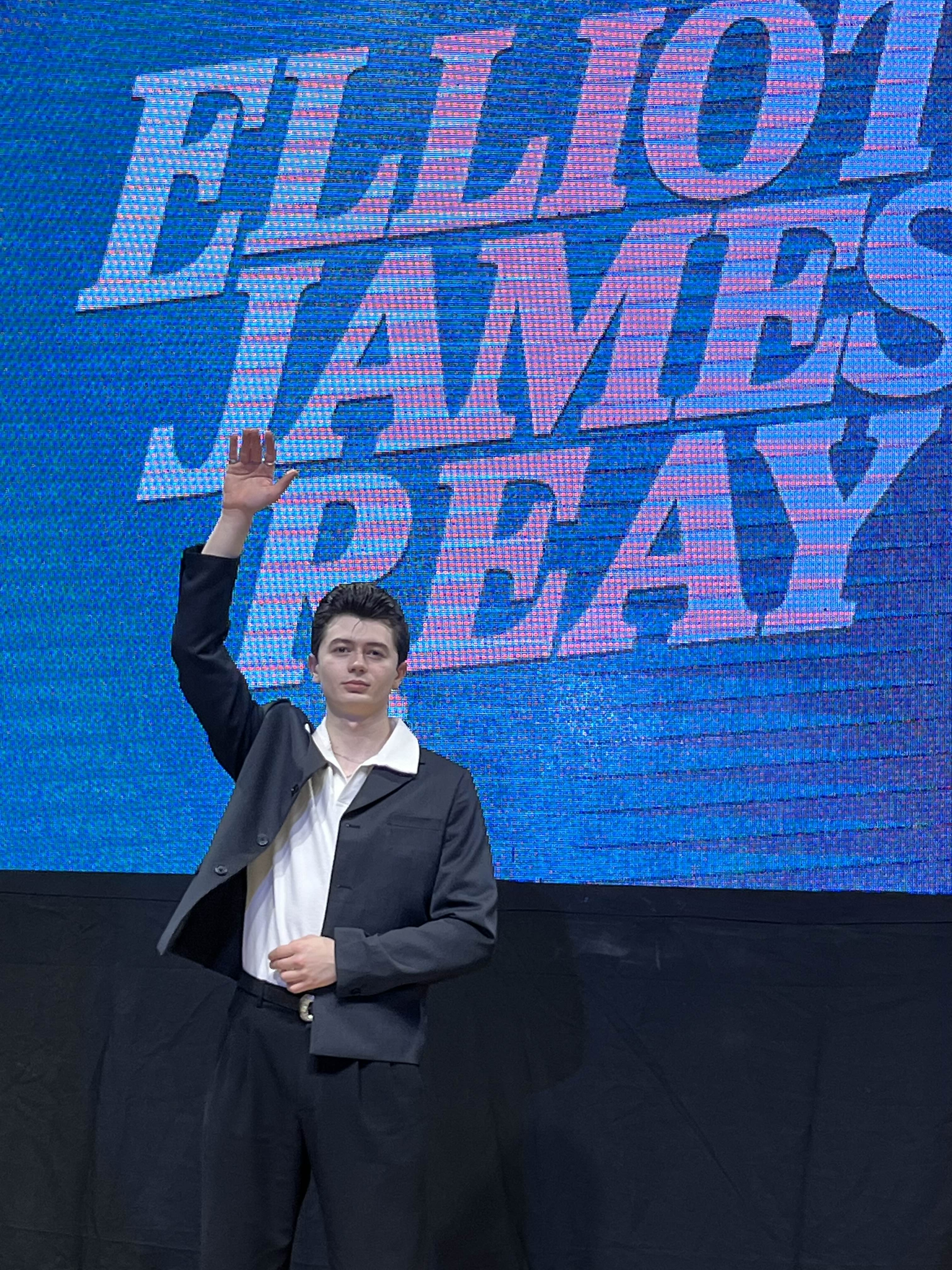
Elliot James Reay at a mall show event in Manila, Philippines.

During performances, Reay wears vintage-style outfits, such as bowling shirts, leather jackets, and high-waisted trousers, purchased in thrift stores. Reay has cited classic film stars such as James Dean, Alain Delon, and Marlon Brando as inspiration for what he wears and how he presents himself. Reay styles his hair in a quiff, echoing the iconic pompadour hairstyle worn in the 1950s and 1960s by early rock 'n' roll and movie stars such as Elvis Presley and James Dean.

While known to be an Elvis fan, and having been portrayed as Gen Z's Elvis Presley, Reay himself has said: "I'm not trying to be Elvis... I'm just influenced by him." Regarding his single "I Think They Call this Love", Reay has furthermore stated that "People thinking the song was a cover of Elvis was interesting to me because while it is indeed flattering, I personally don't think it sounds like Elvis. I know his fanbase very well and they're very hardcore in saying nothing can be as good as Elvis, which I completely agree with because Elvis was Elvis. I'm not Elvis, I'm something different."

Despite the vintage sound Reay has established with his music, he wants to keep the message of his songs current, using modern language with references and nods to the past. Reay stated "I like to maintain a good mixture of old-school love with the language of today that connects it well".

== Discography ==
=== Extended Plays ===
List of extended plays, with selected details
Title	Details
All This to Say I Love You	Released: 27 June 2025; Label: Interscope Records, EMI; Format: digital download

=== Singles ===
List of singles, with year released and EP name
Title	Year	Extended Play (EP)
"I Think They Call This Love"	2024	All This To Say I Love You
"Boy in Love"	2024	All This To Say I Love You
"Daydreaming"	2025	All This To Say I Love You
"Who Knew Dancing Was A Sin"	2025	All This To Say I Love You
"Unchained Melody – Live"	2025	

== Performances ==
After the release of his first two singles, Reay performed during a debut show in his hometown Manchester in December 2024.

Reay subsequently embarked on a promo tour in South East Asia, with show cases and live performances in various Southeast Asian nations – including Vietnam, Thailand, Malaysia, and the Philippines. As part of the promo tour, Reay sang his debut single "I Think They Call This Love" at a live radio bus road show hosted by DNWU (Wish 107.5), appeared as a guest on the Philippine television noontime variety show It's Showtime in January 2025 and on the local entertainment show ASAP in February 2025.

During his debut show and his South East Asia promo tour, Reay blended his released songs with unreleased songs as well as covers of Elvis Presley songs, such as Heartbreak Hotel.

In May 2025, Reay performed at The Great Escape Festival in Brighton, marking it his first appearance at a music festival. Reay stated: "It is my first festival! I'm excited, I've never done a gig on a beach before. I’ve also never done a gig that isn't just focused on me. So it's nice to do something that means after my set, I can enjoy so many other styles of music".

In July 2025 – shortly after the release of his debut EP – Reay embarked on his All This To Say I Love You debut tour in the UK. All 4 shows were sold out.

Reay performed at music festivals in Jakarta and Seoul in the summer of 2025. He was the opening act in the first half of the North American leg of Benson Boone's American Heart Tour in August and September 2025, and in the UK and the EU legs of this tour in October and November 2025. In February 2026, he performed at the Bluebird Cafe in Nashville.

=== Headlining ===
- Debut show: Manchester, U.K., 17 December 2024
- Southeast Asia promo tour: Singapore, Malaysia, Vietnam, Thailand, Indonesia, Philippines
- All This to Say I Love You Tour: U.K., July 2025

=== Opening Act ===
- Benson Boone – American Heart World Tour (2025–2026)

=== Festivals ===
- Great Escape Festival: Brighton, UK, May 2025
- Funtaztic.ly Festival: Jakarta, Indonesia, July 2025
- One Universe Festival: Seoul, Korea, Aug 2025
