= Feel (A-Mei EP) =

1999 extended play by A-Mei

EP by A-Mei
- Released: April 20, 1999
- Recorded: 1999
- Genre: Pop
- Length: 18:22
- Label: Forward Music
- Producers: Martin Tang; Ma Yu-fen; Tong Kong; Yu Guangyan

A-Mei chronology
Holding Hands (1998)	Feel (1999)	Can I Hug You, Lover? (1999)

Feel (Chinese: 感覺) is the first extended play by Taiwanese singer A-Mei. It was released on April 20, 1999, by Forward Music. The EP contains four songs in total on the Taiwanese edition and six song on the Hong Kongese edition. The EP Feel was released to coincide with a Sprite advertisement. A-Mei was the spokesperson for Sprite Asia in 1999, who also created "Give Me Feelings" and "Sunrise" for A-Mei. Feel has sold 180,000 copies in Taiwan, making it the best-selling EP in Taiwanese music history.

== Background and development ==
In 1999, the beverage company Sprite wanted to use A-Mei's personality to convey the brand personality of their soda drink, so they invited A-Mei to be the spokesperson for their beverage in Asia. In order to match the advertisement, they released the EP album Feel, and created the advertisement song "Give Me Feelings," which was written by Wu Yukang and Chen Zhihan, and to make the brand even more youthful, the lyrics used the words "Come on Come on, Give Me Feelings."

== Writing and production ==
"Give Me Feelings" is a song, which is 10 years apart from 1989's "Follow the Feelings (跟着感觉走)", but is even more than its predecessor. During the performance of the song, A-Mei's spirited vocals were paired with dance moves. The stylish and bouncy "Give Me Feelings" and other songs came out one after another, gradually established A-Mei's position in the singing world.

The song "Sunrise" serves as the theme song of the vast WORLD MUSIC Sprite advertisement No. 2 in 1999. The song was written and composed by Tong Kong (童孔). "Sunrise" keeps a brighter energy to it, which ties it in with “Give Me Feelings,” but it has a more laid back arrangement.

== Release and promotion ==
The songs "Give Me Feelings" and "Sunrise" both appeared in Sprite commercials. The first Sprite commercial features "Give Me Feelings"; in the first commercial A-Mei leads a throng of young people in a celebration of song and dance in the streets. She then runs into beauty parlors and restaurants, where she pulls off bystanders' masks off and invites them to join in the revelry. The second commercial that features "Sunrise" shows A-Mei dancing with her dancers in a dance studio, driving four-wheel ATVs on the beach with her friends, playing basketball in an outside basketball court with a bunch of children and eating seafood and drinking Sprite at a house party; with the final shot of the commercial showing A-Mei asleep on a chair with a puppy in her arm. The first commercial was filmed in Shanghai on the afternoon of January 19, 1999, which resulted in traffic jams around the shooting site.

=== Live performances ===
In February 2000, A-Mei performed "Give Me Feelings" at the CCTV Spring Festival Gala in Beijing. On January 20, 2007, A-Mei performed the song at Sprite China Original Music Pop Chart Annual General Selection Award Ceremony in Chengdu. On February 13, 2007, she performed the song at the Overseas Spring Festival Bilingual Gala in Las Vegas.

=== Singles and music videos ===
The music video for "Give Me Feelings" was directed by Shao Yuanzhi (邵元智). The music videos for both the songs carry identical storylines from their respective commercials. In January 2000, "Give Me Feelings" was listed at number 66 on the 1999 Hit FM Top 100 Singles of the Year chart.

== Accolades ==
"Give Me Feelings" was one of the winning songs of the 6th Chinese Top 20 Song Awards at the 5th China Music Awards, which was held by Channel V.

== Track listing ==
Taiwan edition
No.	Title	Lyrics	Music	Arrangement	Length
1.	"給我感覺" (Give Me Feelings)	Wu Yukang; Chen Zhihan	Chen Chih-yuan	Martin Tang	4:13
2.	"日出" (Sunrise)	Tong Kong	Tong Kong	Tong Kong	4:21
3.	"給我感覺 (Unplugged)" (Give Me Feelings)	Wu Yukang; Chen Zhihan	Chen Chih-yuan	Ricky Ho	4:01
4.	"給我感覺（弦樂版）" (Give Me Feelings (String Version))	Wu Yukang; Chen Zhihan	Cheng Hua Jiuan	Ricky Ho	5:47
Total length:					18:22

Hong Kong edition
No.	Title	Lyrics	Music	Arrangement	Length
1.	"給我感覺" (Give Me Feelings)	Wu Yukang; Chen Zhihan	Chen Chih-yuan	Martin Tang	4:13
2.	"藍天" (Blue Sky)	Yu Guangyan	Ian Chen; Chen Zhengqing	Li Bojie	4:15
3.	"日出" (Sunrise)	Tong Kong	Tong Kong	Tong Kong	4:21
4.	"I Do Not Mind" (我無所謂)	Eric Lin	Michael Tu		4:59
5.	"給我感覺（Unplugged）" (Give Me Feelings)	Wu Yukang; Chen Zhihan	Chen Chih-yuan	Ricky Ho	4:01
6.	"給我感覺（弦樂版）" (Give Me Feelings (String Version))	Wu Yukang; Chen Zhihan	Cheng Hua Jiuan	Ricky Ho	5:47
Total length:					27:39

== Charts ==
Chart (1999)	Peak position
Taiwan Singles (IFPI)	1
