= Boy in Love =

Single by Elliot James Reay

from the EP All This to Say I Love You
- Released: 22 November 2024
- Genre: Rock and roll; rockabilly
- Length: 2:37
- Songwriters: Elliot James Reay; Joshua Reis Noble; Karl Ziegler; Annielle Lisiuk
- Producers: SOAP; Nathanael Graham; Prash Mistry

Elliot James Reay singles chronology
"I Think They Call This Love" (2024)	"Boy in Love" (2024)	"Daydreaming" (2025)

7" vinyl issue
- Limited edition release

"Boy in Love" is the second single by English singer-songwriter Elliot James Reay, released in 2024. The track is styled after early rock ’n’ roll and rockabilly, drawing on the sound of 1950s recordings while incorporating a modern vocal approach. The corresponding music video depicts Reay stepping out of a pink old-timer Buick car to walk through autumnal Manchester.

== Background ==
After his debut single "I Think They Call This Love", Reay signed with EMI and Interscope Records and, on 22 November 2024, released "Boy in Love" as his second single.

Reay wrote the song together with Annielle Lisiuk and the Manchester duo SOAP (Josh Noble and Karl Ziegler). While working in the studio, Reay reportedly took a break. The bassline for "Boy in Love" came into his head while in the bathroom. Reay returned to the studio with the melody and said "This is what we're doing now." According to Reay, the track was written in around 20 minutes. Reay was pleased with the result and realized that it would become his second single: "That day, I walked instead of taking an Uber home from the studio. I was just skipping home, playing it over and over again. I just knew that it was going to be the next song."

Like his debut single, "Boy in Love" is a song about love, "straight from the heart". In further discussing the track, Reay said that in addition to being read as a simple love song, "Boy in Love" has a deeper meaning about masculinity and learning to accept. Throughout the track, the narrator describes emotional reactions such as "Suddenly I'm crawlin' to her on my knees" and "Suddenly I need her like a harmony" that conflict with conventional ideals of confidence and control often associated with masculinity. As the song progresses, he increasingly acknowledges these feelings rather than attempting to suppress them, framing them as a natural part of being "a boy in love."

Compared to Reay's debut single, "Boy in Love" marks a shift toward a more energetic, rock-influenced style. The single and the accompanying music video contain subtle references to 1950s-1960s artists. The opening chord of "Boy in Love" is similar to The Everly Brothers' classic "All I Have to Do Is Dream" (1958), while the line "But, now, when Sam Cooke sings, she got me whistling along" is a direct reference to Sam Cooke. Reay describes these subtle nods as "little easter eggs to people who get it".

== Reception and performances ==
"Boy in Love" attracted more than 550,000 streams on Spotify in its first week alone. The song has been met with notably positive reception from both critics and listeners. Reviews have noted the single's nostalgic charm and its lively 1950s–60s rock'n'roll energy as a strong continuation of Reay's retro signature style and Reay's ability to revive the spirit of the 1950s rock.

The single is included in Reay's debut extended play All This to Say I Love You, and it was on the set list of Reay's sold-out debut headlining tour in 2025. Reay furthermore used "Boy in Love" as the opening song for his supporting act in Benson Boone's American Heart Tour.

== Music video ==
The release of the single was accompanied by a music video directed by James Slater and filmed on the streets of Reay's hometown of Bury, Greater Manchester. In the music video, Reay embodies the classic look of a 1950s rockstar, wearing retro fashion and having his hair styled in a pompadour. The music video consists of two takes only. In the first take, Reay exits a pink old-timer Buick car and walks down the street to a club. In the second take, Reay is shown inside the club, playing snooker – a known interest of Reay – and dancing, before putting on a black leather jacket with the words "Boy in Love". On 20 December 2024, a lyric video was released in which Reay is seen walking down the streets in the same jacket. Additional "Behind the Scenes" and "Making of the Track" videos were released on 29 November and 11 December 2024, respectively.
