= All This to Say I Love You =

2025 debut extended play by Elliot James Reay

EP by Elliot James Reay
- Released: 27 June 2025
- Recorded: 2024–2025
- Genre: Rock and roll; retro pop
- Length: 18:00
- Label: Interscope; EMI
- Producer: SOAP; Glen Roberts

Vinyl
- Limited black vinyl

All This to Say I Love You is the debut extended play (EP) by English singer Elliot James Reay. It was released on 27 June 2025 through Interscope and EMI and contains six tracks, including the singles "I Think They Call This Love", "Boy in Love", "Daydreaming", and "Who Knew Dancing Was a Sin", alongside "Sweetness" and "I Can't Stay Away". Across the project Reay continues his vintage-inflected sound with modern pop arrangements. The bulk of the EP was written and produced with Manchester duo SOAP (Josh Noble and Karl Ziegler). Reay supported the release of the EP with his All This To Say I Love You Tour, with sold-out shows in Manchester, Birmingham, Bristol, and London.

== Background and release ==
Reay introduced the EP cycle with his debut single "I Think They Call This Love" on 17 July 2024, followed by "Boy in Love" in November 2024, "Daydreaming" on 28 March 2025, and "Who Knew Dancing Was a Sin" on 23 May 2025. The EP arrived on 27 June 2025, the same day Reay issued a Technicolor-styled video for "Sweetness", directed by Nikko LaMere.

== Track listing ==
All This to Say I Love You track listing
No.	Title	Writer(s)	Producer(s)	Length
1.	"I Think They Call This Love"	Elliot James Reay; Glen Roberts; Annielle Lisiuk	Glen Roberts; SOAP	3:13
2.	"Boy In Love"	Elliot James Reay; Joshua Reis Noble; Karl Ziegler; Annielle Lisiuk	SOAP; Nathanael Graham; Prash Mistry	2:37
3.	"Daydreaming"	Elliot James Reay; Joshua Reis Noble; Karl Ziegler; Theo Hutchcraft; Annielle Lisiuk; David Tobin	SOAP; Nathanael Graham; Randy Merrill; Prash Mistry	3:19
4.	"Who Knew Dancing Was a Sin"	Elliot James Reay; Joshua Reis Noble; Glen Roberts; Karl Ziegler; Annielle Lisiuk	SOAP; Nathanael Graham; Hector Vega; Daniel Na; Prash Mistry	3:14
5.	"Sweetness"	Elliot James Reay; Joshua Reis Noble; Karl Ziegler; Annielle Lisiuk; David Tobin	SOAP; Nathanael Graham; Hector Vega Prash Mistry	3:19
6.	"I Can't Stay Away"	Elliot James Reay; Joshua Reis Noble; Karl Ziegler; Annielle Lisiuk; David Tobin	SOAP; Nathanael Graham; Hector Vega Prash Mistry	2:15
