= I Think They Call This Love =

Single by Elliot James Reay
- Released: 17 July 2024
- Recorded: 2024
- Genre: Rock and roll; rockabilly; pop
- Length: 3:13
- Songwriters: Elliot James Reay; Annielle Lisiuk; Glen Roberts
- Producers: Glen Roberts; SOAP

Elliot James Reay singles chronology
"I Think They Call This Love" (2024)	"Boy in Love" (2024)

7" vinyl issue
- Limited edition release

"I Think They Call This Love" is the debut single by English singer Elliot James Reay. Released on 17 July 2024, it is the lead single of Reay's debut extended-play All This To Say I Love You. The song has been streamed more than 175 million times on Spotify. It peaked at number 65 on the UK Singles Chart and number 3 on the UK Vinyl Singles Chart. After releasing "I Think They Call This Love" as an independent artist, Reay eventually signed with EMI and Interscope Records.

== Background ==
Reay had previously been posting covers of 1950s-60s songs from Elvis Presley and Roy Orbison on YouTube since the age of 17, which is a style Reay has cited influenced him in the making of the song. While attracting millions of views on social media, Reay grew tired of the repetition of making cover videos and realized that – without his own original music – "it's all just a hobby".

Reay wrote "I Think They Call This Love" with his first love, in three to four hours of trial and error. He said that the words and melody came very easy, as the song itself sounds like something he would listen to. The line "Good vibrations getting loud" in the lyrics is a reference to the song Good Vibrations by the Beach Boys. "I Think They Call This Love" is based on Reay's own experience of falling in love for the first time. Lyrics include "They say, you know when you know, so let's face it: you had me at 'hello.'"

Reay was initially advised against making "I Think They Call This Love" and told to release something more radio-friendly or widely liked as his first single instead. He persisted and recorded the song anyway with the producer duo SOAP. To stay close to a 1950s vintage style, the single was recorded live to tape as much as possible, using live instruments and vintage equipment, and keeping digital manipulation to an absolute minimum.

== Composition ==
The song is sung in the key of E♭ major, and switches to F major during the bridge and final chorus, with a time signature of 12/8.

== Reception and performances ==
The single received over 10 million views prior to its full release in July, and over 200 million streams across Spotify and YouTube since. It was on Spotify's Viral charts in 27+ countries, reaching #4 on the Global Viral 50. The song peaked at number 65 on the UK Singles Chart in March 2025.

Over 100,000 users have used the music of "I Think They Call This Love" in their own TikTok videos. In March 2025, Reay's debut single won the "Road to Memphis" competition, where it was chosen from over 33,000 international entries.

The 1950s vintage style of the song and accompanying music video have some listeners across social media platforms erroneously believe it is an Elvis Presley cover. Reay stated that while he finds this flattering and has played into it slightly, he does not think it sounds like Elvis.

Reay has sung the song live many times since its release, among others during his debut show at The Deaf Institute in Manchester in December 2024. He has also performed the song multiple times on Philippine media, including television programs It's Showtime and ASAP and at a live radio bus road show hosted by DNWU (Wish 107.5). The single was included in Reay's debut extended play All This To Say I Love You .Upon the release of this EP in the summer of 2025, Reay embarked on his debut headlining tour, performing "I Think They Call This Love" at each of the four shows on the tour. Reay also sang "I Think They Call This Love" while opening for Benson Boone's American Heart World Tour in 2025 and 2026.

== Music videos ==
An official lyric video for the song was released on July 17, 2024, on YouTube, with an official music video following shortly after on July 25, 2024. "The Making Of" and "Behind The Scenes" videos were released respectively on July 21, 2024, and July 31, 2024. An additional acoustic version was released on 17 September 2024.

Reay wanted to keep the music video simple to keep the song the focal part. As he was independent (unsigned) at the time the music video was created, a lot of it is "homemade" and Reay styled himself.

== Charts ==
Weekly charts
Chart (2025)	Peak position
UK Singles (OCC)	65
UK Vinyl Singles (OCC)	3
UK Physical Singles (OCC)	4

== Cover versions ==
Multiple cover versions of the song have been released:

- Singer-songwriter Matthew Ifield released a cover version of the song on 28 November 2024, which has garnered over 80 million streams on Spotify, and 80 million views on YouTube.
- Singer Khunpol of the Thai boy group BUS released a cover of I Think They Call This Love on 21 September 2025. In the music video, Khunpol is seen searching through a record store where he eventually finds the 7" vinyl of the original song, featuring Reay's picture on the sleeve.

Matthew Ifield version
Chart (2025–2026)	Peak position
India International (IMI)	6
