= Holding Hands (album) =

Studio album by A-Mei
- Released: October 12, 1998
- Recorded: 1998
- Studio: Forward Studio; Platinum Studio (Taipei); Maestro Studio; Puliyin Studio; Form Studio (Singapore); Ladiaum Music House; Jojo Eyeball Studio; Room 711 (Los Angeles)
- Genre: Mandopop; R&B; dance-pop
- Length: 48:10
- Label: Forward Music
- Producer: Martin Tang; David Tao; Jerry Huang; Ma Yu-fen; Guo Tzu; Yu Guangyan; Chen Fuming; Chen Chih-yuan

A-Mei chronology
You Make Me Free Make Me Fly! (1997)	Holding Hands (1998)	Feel (1999)

Holding Hands (Chinese: 牽手; pinyin: Qiānshǒu) is the fourth studio album by Taiwanese singer A-Mei. It was released on October 12, 1998, by Forward Music. The album was produced by musicians such as David Tao, Chen Chih-yuan and Jerry Huang and was A-Mei's first original studio album since the death of her mentor Chang Yu-sheng eleven months prior. On the record, A-Mei sang Chang's posthumous works "Are You Ready" and "After Knowing," and for the first time, she collaborated with David Tao on the songs "Don't Lie To Me" and "High High High," which allowed A-Mei to try out different kinds of music creations. The music on Holding Hands fuses pop music with other genres including R&B, dance pop, adult contemporary and rock music.

Commercially, Holding Hands was a success. The album was certified by Taiwan's IFPI as the top selling album of the year, selling over 790,000 copies in the span of one month. The album has since sold over 1.1 million copies in Taiwan, as well as over 5 million copies in Asia. To promote the album, A-Mei held a New Year's Eve concert titled "Sisters Acting, Singing and Partying Through 1999" at Nangang, Taipei.

== Background and development ==
On December 29, 1997, A-Mei released the innovative album You Make Me Free Make Me Fly!, which served as an in advance listen for her very first concert tour that was to be held the following year in 1998. The album was a commercial success, selling 800,000 units in Taiwan, while also selling an additional 4 million copies throughout Asia.

On January 10, 1998, A-Mei held her first large-scale ticketed concert titled A-Mei Live in Concert 1998. It became the fastest-selling concert in Taiwan in the past 10 years and had a very fanatic audience, with both shows at the Taipei Municipal Stadium and Kaohsiung Central Park being full houses. On March 21, 1998, and March 22, 1998, she held two ticketed concerts at Hong Kong Coliseum. The two Hong Kong concerts were sold out within 8 hours after tickets going on sale, breaking the fastest ticket selling record in Hong Kong at the time. The 2 shows at the Singapore Indoor Stadium also set a number of records, including the record for the fastest sold-out concert: the first show was sold out within 10 hours while the second was sold out within 8 hours. In all, the tour drew in about 100,000 spectators. Work on her follow-up album began after the tour wrapped up.

== Writing and recording ==
David Tao, one of A-Mei's collaborators on the album

"Are You Ready" and "After Knowing" were the two posthumous songs on the album written by Chang Yu-sheng. The latter was originally sung by Chang on his 1994 album Karaoke Live - Taipei - Me. "Dreaming of Titanic" is a synthesizer-heavy ballad. "Lonely Bowling" is a reggae-style number written and composed entirely by Cheng Hua Jiuan. "Surrender to Love" is a melodic ballad. Two songs on the album, "Don't Lie To Me" and "High High High," were written by David Tao; both of the songs carried strong Americanized R&B influences.

The power ballad "Blue Sky" was written by Yu Guangyan and composed by Ian Chen and Chen Zhengqing. The album's title track is an upbeat pop rock song written by Chen Zhihan, also wrote the album's ninth track "Open Your Eyes." The final song on the album, "After Knowing," is a pop ballad that features a gospel choir.

== Release and promotion ==
The album's standard edition contains the 10 new songs. The second edition of the album comes in a cardboard slipcase with two independent VCDs in separate jewel cases. The first disc is a collection of music videos of the album Holding Hands, with lyrics to sing along to on karaoke. The second disc is a full live performance on Chinese television. No broadcast date is indicated, but it should be recent from the album's release date, since most of the songs off Holding Hands are played. Around the holiday season of 1998, Forward Music released a Christmas Special Edition of Holding Hands, which came in a slipcase and was packaged with a CD and a VCD. In 1999, Forward Music released a cassette edition of Holding Hands.

=== Singles and music videos ===
The music videos for the songs "Holding Hands" and "Dreaming of Titanic" were both directed by renowned Taiwanese music video director Kuang Sheng. The music videos for "Don't Lie To Me," "High High High," "Open Your Eyes," "Blue Sky" and "Lonely Bowling" were all directed by Jinhe Lin. The music video for "High High High" features Taiwanese magician Lu Chen. The tracks "After Knowing," "Are You Ready" and "Surrender to Love" use edited concert footage for their accompanying music videos, with the video for "Surrender to Love" featuring a cameo from Isaac Chen. In January 1999, the tracks "Holding Hands" and "Blue Sky" were listed at number 2 and number 13 respectively on the 1998 Hit FM Top 100 Singles of the Year chart.

== Accolades ==
The album Holding Hands earned A-Mei a nomination for Best Female Mandarin Singer at the 10th Golden Melody Awards. The album's title track made it onto the leaderboard of the 5th China Music Awards' TOP 20 most popular songs (the winning songs are ranked in no particular order), which was held by Channel V. The title track also won the silver Outstanding Mandarin song award at the 1998 RTHK Top 10 Gold Songs Awards. In 1999, she won the award for "The most powerful female singer in the music industry" at the 1998 Top Music Chart Awards Ceremony hosted by TVB Jade and TVB.

== Track listing ==
No.	Title	Lyrics	Music	Arrangement	Length
1.	"Are You Ready"	Chang Yu-sheng	Chang Yu-sheng	Martin Tang	4:02
2.	"不要騙我" (Don't Lie To Me)	David Tao	David Tao	David Tao	4:50
3.	"夢見鐵達尼" (Dreaming of Titanic)	Wu Yukang	Chen Chih-yuan	Tu Ying	4:36
4.	"寂寞保齡球" (Lonely Bowling)	Cheng Hua Jiuan	Cheng Hua Jiuan	Martin Tang	5:30
5.	"對愛投降" (Surrender to Love)	Wu Yukang	Guo Tzu	Goh Kheng Long	5:10
6.	"High High High"	David Tao	David Tao	David Tao	4:08
7.	"藍天" (Blue Sky)	Yu Guangyan	Ian Chen, Chen Zhengqing	Li Bojie	4:15
8.	"牽手" (Holding Hands)	Chen Zhihan	Chen Zhihan	Martin Tang	4:44
9.	"Open Your Eyes"	Chen Zhihan	Chen Zhihan	Goh Kheng Long	5:59
10.	"後知後覺" (After Knowing)	Chang Yu-sheng	Chang Yu-sheng	Chen Chih-yuan	5:22
Total length:					48:10

== Charts ==
Chart (1998)	Peak position
Hong Kong Albums (IFPI)	5
Malaysian Albums (RIM)	9
Taiwanese Albums (IFPI Taiwan)	1

== Sales and certifications ==
Region	Certification	Certified units/sales
Taiwan (RIT)	3× Platinum+Gold	1,100,000
Summaries
Asia	—	5,000,000
