= Bad Boy (A-Mei album) =

1997 album by A-Mei

Studio album by A-Mei
- Released: June 7, 1997
- Recorded: 1997
- Studios: Platinum Studio (Taipei); Forward Studio; A-String Recording Studio; Mega Force Studio; Beat Sound Studio (Taipei); Sun House Studio (Taipei); Premium Recording Studio; Form Recording Studio (Singapore)
- Genres: Mandopop; R&B
- Length: 49:03
- Label: Forward Music
- Producers: Chang Yu-sheng; Benjamin Lin; Ma Yu-fen; Yu Guangyan

A-Mei chronology
Sisters (1996)	Bad Boy (1997)	You Make Me Free Make Me Fly! (1997)

Bad Boy is the second studio album by Taiwanese singer A-Mei. It was released on June 7, 1997, by Forward Music. Predominantly an R&B, pop and soul record, Bad Boy centers on the theme of love and relationships. The album was produced by her mentor Chang Yu-sheng with the aid of Benjamin Lin, Ma Yu-fen and Yu Guangyan. It was ultimately the last album of hers that Chang was actively involved with due to his untimely death caused by a car crash five months later. On August 17, 2018, 21 years after its initial release date, a vinyl reissue of Bad Boy was released by Forward Music.

Commercially, the album found immense success at home and abroad, topping Taiwan's IFPI sales chart for nine weeks and went on to sell over 1.38 million copies in Taiwan alone. Since its release, Bad Boy has remained the highest-selling album of all time in Taiwan. The album also managed to shift more than six million copies throughout Asia in just six months, setting a major record for the highest sales for a Taiwanese singer.

In order to promote Bad Boy, five songs off it were released as singles; the title track, "Can't Cry," "Whenever I Think About You," "Dancing Alone" and "Listen to the Sea." All five singles attained commercial success throughout Asia and are now regarded as modern day classics in the Mandopop genre. To this very day they are still sung at karaoke boxes and are often performed by contestants on major televised singing competitions. A-Mei performed songs from the album on her concert tour A-Mei Live in Concert 1998 the following year.

== Background and production ==
Seven months prior, A-Mei released her debut studio album, Sisters. The record became an immediate success, selling over 1.21 million copies in Taiwan, becoming the fourth best-selling album of all time in the country, and shipping an additional 4 million copies throughout Asia. The album's meteoric success broke a glass ceiling for Taiwanese aborigines in show business. This meteoric rise to fame lead Billboard Magazine to declare her Asia's most popular singer on May 17, 1997.

Afterwards, Chang Yu-sheng produced the album Bad Boy for A-Mei. In terms of production, Chang chose to continue the "happy songs + love songs" model from the preceding album Sisters. At the time of the album's production, Forward Music was just starting out, and producer Chang's request to A-Mei was to incorporate the singing style of the Beinan countryside into the songs, and sing them "a bit rockier, a bit more violent"; he hoped to inspire A-Mei's unique qualities, believing that such qualities were not possessed or were too shy to be displayed by urban women, the largest audience for pop music. In addition, Chang also added some fashionable elements to the album.

The album's biggest hit "Listen to the Sea" was written by Eric Lin and was composed by Michael Tu. On the day of writing the lyrics of "Listen to the Sea," Eric Lin went to a small bar with a book and didn't come out until four in the morning, then followed the bartender and drove to have a late-night snack, and at that time the dawn was breaking in the sky, and one of the waiters suddenly said that she would like to go to the seaside to have a look, and everybody felt that the proposal was good, so the group went there. When they went there, they sat on the beach and chatted, and Lin asked the girls about their relationship status and their views on relationships. All their answers were different, which gave Lin a certain understanding of women's views on relationships in that era, and laid the groundwork for the creation of "Listen to the Sea." It was not originally intended to be the title song, but fans liked it so much that they urged it to become the fourth title song.

== Writing and recording ==
Bad Boy opens with the track "Can't Cry," a power ballad that fully demonstrates A-Mei's prowess in singing lyrical slow songs. The title track, "Whenever I Think About You" and "Lonely Tequila" were composed and written entirely by Chang Yu-sheng. The second song "Whenever I Think About You" in particular serves as a continuation of the song "Sisters" and adds in aboriginal elements and carries a cheerful mood. "Lonely Tequila" is the third track on the album, and is a power ballad laced with saxophone accents. "Dancing Alone," the fourth song on the album, was written by Yu Guangyan and composed by Sky Wu and is a fast-paced dance song. The fifth track on the album is "Listen to the Sea," an impassioned love song that showcases A-Mei's vocal deliveries.

The albums sixth track "Bad Boy" is an upbeat song inspired by Latin pop music. "Sweet Words" is the seventh track on Bad Boy, and is a Flamenco guitar-driven pop ballad. "Lover? Enemy?," the albums eighth track, is a pop rock and R&B ballad composed of an orchestral music arrangement and dark harmonies. "Loving Isn't Too Early or Too Late," is a synthesizer-laden ballad. The album closes with the song "Loved You," a pop ballad with R&B and gospel influences.

== Reception ==
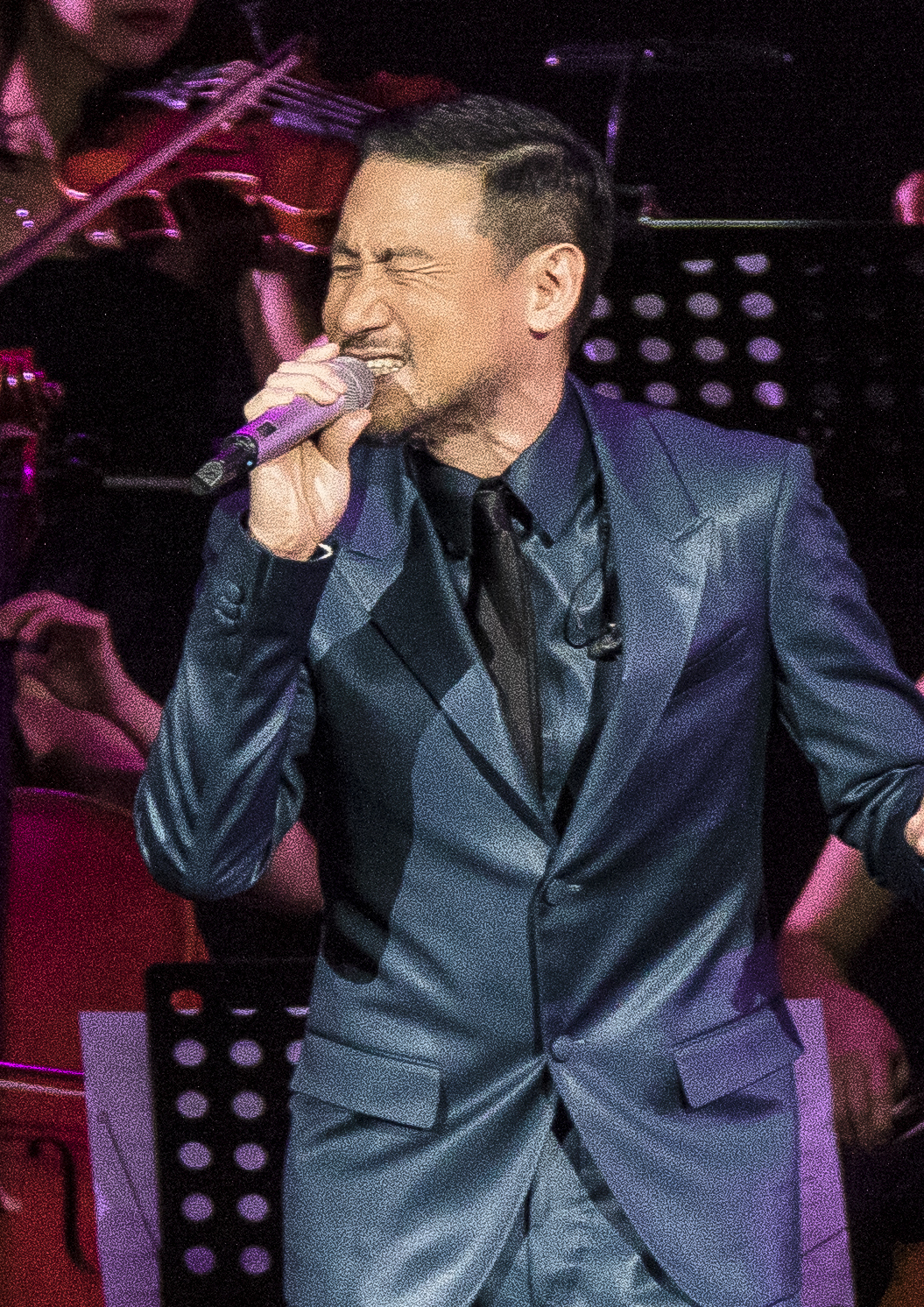
Bad Boy broke the record for the highest-selling album in Taiwan, which was previously held by Jacky Cheung's 1993 album The Goodbye Kiss

Buoyed by the success of several hit singles, Bad Boy debuted at number one on the Taiwan IFPI albums chart and remained at that position on the chart for nine weeks, becoming her second consecutive record to accomplish this. Bad Boy sold 1.38 million copies in Taiwan, making it the record holder for Taiwan's highest-selling album to date, a record which was previously held by Jacky Cheung's The Goodbye Kiss (1993). The album sold 6 million copies throughout Asia. The success of Bad Boy led A-Mei to receive various music awards in Asia, which attracted the high attention of the international music scene and established her status as one of the most sought-after celebrities in East Asia.

The album's title track made it onto the leaderboard of the 4th China Music Awards' Chinese Top 20 Chart Songs, which was held by Channel V. At the same ceremony she also won the prize for Best Newcomer. At the 9th Golden Melody Awards held in 1998, Michael Tu was nominated for Best Composer for his work on the song "Listen to the Sea." At the same ceremony A-Mei herself was nominated for Best Mandarin Female Singer while the album Bad Boy was nominated for Album of the Year. Bad Boy ranked first in the 1997 Golden Songs Dragon and Tiger Chart Annual Ranking on February 17, 1998.

== In Other Media ==
The eponymous song "Bad Boy", appeared on the fourth episode of the second season of Brave Animated Series, "Demonic Psychological Counseling", when Sage, Goblin, Bunny, Slime and the Golem Demons renovate the subterrain caves of the Morewant's Tower, while he and the Blood King train each other for the Philosopher's Stone.

== Track listing ==
No.	Title	Lyrics	Music	Arrangement	Length
1.	"哭不出來" (Can't Cry)	Liu Si Ming	Liu Zhihong	Baby Chung	4:44
2.	"一想到你呀" (Whenever I Think About You)	Chang Yu-sheng	Chang Yu-sheng	Koji Sakurai	4:48
3.	"孤單Tequila" (Lonely Tequila)	Chang Yu-sheng	Chang Yu-sheng	Koji Sakurai	5:11
4.	"一個人跳舞" (Dancing Alone)	Yu Guangyan	Sky Wu	Baby Chung	4:29
5.	"聽海" (Listen to the Sea)	Eric Lin	Michael Tu	Michael Tu	5:18
6.	"Bad Boy"	Chang Yu-sheng	Chang Yu-sheng	Martin Tang	4:22
7.	"甜言蜜語" (Sweet Words)	Zheng Huajuan	Zheng Huajuan	Koji Sakurai	4:51
8.	"情人？敵人？" (Lover? Enemy?)	Wu Yukang	Guo Tzu	Ricky Ho	5:00
9.	"愛，不太早不太晚，剛好。" (Loving Isn't Too Early or Too Late)	Daryl Yao	Zheng Zhiming	Martin Tang	4:49
10.	"愛過你" (Loved You)	Lo-Jung Chen	Chen Chih-yuan	Chen Chih-yuan	5:27
Total length:					49:03

== Charts ==
=== Weekly charts ===
Chart (1997)	Peak position
Taiwanese Albums (IFPI Taiwan)	1

=== Year-end charts ===
Chart (1997)	Position
Taiwanese Albums (IFPI Taiwan)	1

== Sales and certifications ==
Region	Certification	Certified units/sales
Taiwan (RIT)	3× Platinum+Gold	1,380,000
Summaries
Asia	—	6,000,000
