= Chia-Li Chen =

Taiwanese lyricist

Chia-Li Chen (Chinese: 陳家麗; born February 1956) is a Taiwanese lyricist with ancestral roots in Hebei, China. Her notable works include: Wo De Wei Lai Bu Shi Meng, Give My Special Love to the Special You, Follow Your Feeling, Ai Jiu Yi Ge Zi, etc.

Chia-Li Chen was active in Taiwan's pop music industry during the 1980s and 1990s, working with top artists from Taiwan and Hong Kong such as: Jacky Cheung, Leslie Cheung, Andy Lau, Chang Yu-Sheng, Jeff Chang, Sky Wu, Harlem Yu, Su Rui, Sandy Lam, Tiger Huang, Tarcy Su, Shirley Kwan, Angus Tung, Matilda Tao, Johnny Yin, Victor Huang, David Liu, Ronald Cheng, Chyi Chin, Tsai Chin, Chiang Yu-Heng, David Wong, Winnie Hsin, Sam Lee, Pauline Lan, Chiang Shu-Na, Cyndi Chaw, Zhao-Mei Tai, Wang Chih-Lei, Tai-Yan Yu, and more.

== Career ==
Chia-Li Chen began her career as a screenwriter working in the China Television Company program Creative Theatre, where she was responsible for planning and naming on the show; her work in the program helped her earn a nomination for the Golden Bell Award in writing sketches. In a stroke of luck, she wrote the commercial jingle “Go with Your Feelings” and unexpectedly entered the pop music industry where she began a fantastic musical career. Her lyrics for Chang Yu-Sheng's “My Future is Not a Dream” was featured in commercials specially presented with lyrical captions which helped achieve record sales.

In 1988, missing and runaway children were a social issue in Taiwan. The unusual nature of this occurrence inspired Chia-Li Chen's sense of duty to give back to society and organize “Rediscover Love”. She took on the responsibilities of naming, planning, and organizing the event as well as convincing various record label companies to participate and eventually more than 20 top artists supported the event, including Chyi Yu, Wakin Chau, Harlem Yu, Chiang Yu-Heng, Yeh Huan, Chang Yu-Sheng, Pauline Lan, Tai-Yan Yu, Christine Hsu, Tseng Shu-Chin, Xue Yue, and more; they collectively utilized their influence as musicians to embrace runaway children. Additionally, Chiang Yu-Heng, Harlem Yu, and Pauline Lan also recorded radio commercials calling for children to return to their homes. The event culminated in 2 large outdoor concerts, earning “Rediscover Love” critical acclaim that continues to reverberate today.

In the same year, Chia-Li Chen wrote Chang Yu-Sheng's “He Tian Yi Yang Gao” to commemorate the air force's first victory against the Japanese in Hangzhou on August 14, 1937, as well as encourage youths to join the air force. In 1990, Chia-Li Chen founded “Ju Book” and successfully released their first album while establishing Tarcy Su as a fresh new female artist in the songs “I Can Catch Up with Everything” and “I Live by Myself”. In 1995, the shadow of de-China-fication was cast over Taiwanese culture and many traditional Chinese based creators began to migrate from Taiwan. Chia-Li Chen immigrated to Canada for 10 years before moving to Beijing to gain an in-depth experience of life in China. There, she came to know an exceptional ophthalmologist who led his community to provide free care for the Tibetan people of Qinghai and help them restore their vision. The experience moved Chia-Li Chen deeply, inspiring her to write the lyrics to Jeff Chang's single “Wo Kan Jian”. Throughout her career, Chia-Li Chen's lyrical work has rotated between two worlds of absolutes; one was a sea of emotions while the other resembled the radiance of a sunny day.

== Style ==
Her words often depict vivid, movie-like imagery. She is able to expound unique perspectives on love and delicate yet captivating emotions within mesmerizing melodies. She believes that the soul of a song resides in the title and that every melody possesses its own tone of voice. Her creative style is a mastery of establishing a song title and the precise grasp of tone, resulting in the creation of countless classics.

== Works ==
Listing a few representative works by Chen:

- 跟著感覺走
- 讓我一次愛個夠
- 我的未來不是夢
- 特別的愛給特別的你
- 愛就一個字
- 忘記你我做不到
- 我碰到你的眼光
- 讓愛人去流浪
- 深海
- 藍雨
- 愛到最高點
- 和天一樣高
- 把愛找回來
- 讓每個人都心碎
- 用情
- 火種
- 以為你都知道
- 走不完的圓
- 停止轉動
- 相思無用
- 在我生命中的每一天
- 愛情鳥
- 貼心收藏
- 像我這樣的人
- 我一個人住
- 回到你身邊
- 九月
- 分不到你的愛
- 天空不要為我掉眼淚
- 心上沒有人
- 不如這樣吧
- 世界的鐘
- 台北玫瑰
- 偷幸福

== Awards ==
Year	Award
1990	Nominated for “Song of the Year” in the 1st Golden Melody Awards (“Never Willing to Tell You”, lyrics)
1992	Nominated for “Song of the Year” in the 3rd Golden Melody Awards (“Give My Special Love to the Special You”, lyrics)
2010	Nominated for “30 Years, 30 Songs” in the Chinese Music Awards (“Wo De Wei Lai Bu Shi Meng”, lyrics)
