= Oceana Wu =

Taiwanese actress

- 吳品潔
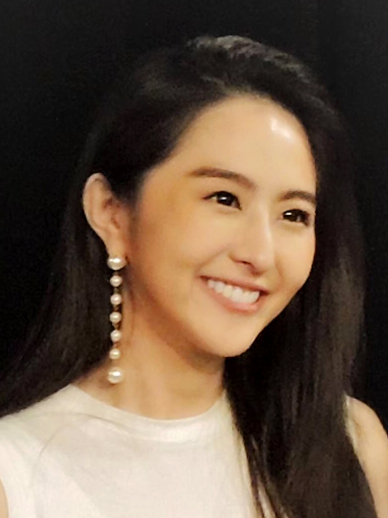
- Born: 29 August 1993 (age 32)
- Citizenship: Taiwan
- Occupation: Actress
- Years active: 2016–present

Oceana Wu (Chinese: 吳品潔; pinyin: Wú Pǐnjié; born on 29 August 1993) is a Taiwanese actress under Enjoy Entertainment Co. She is best known for her role in the television series, Hello Again!

== Background ==
Oceana was first scouted during her university years while working part-time at a restaurant. Upon graduation from Chinese Culture University (in the department of Chinese language and literature), she moved to China and began her acting career in web dramas. In 2017, following completion of her contract, Oceana returned to Taiwan and signed with her current company — Enjoy Entertainment Co. Her role in the television series, Hello Again!, garnered many positive views from the public.

== Filmography ==
=== Television series ===
Year	Title	Role	Notes
2016	My Celestial College	軒轅劍靈/皇帝含光	Ep 9–11,17–19
2016	Prince of Wolf	Rebecca	Cameo Ep18
2017	濟公降魔	小貓精加菲	Ep 4–9
2018	Iron Ladies	Xin Jie Zhong	Cameo Ep11-13
2019	Hello Again!	Jamie Chien	Second Lead

=== Films ===
Year	Title	Role	Notes
2019	遺忘者之絕命狙擊	鄧瀟瀟	

=== Music videos ===
Year	Singer	Title	Album
2017	Janice Yan	閻羅王	I Have Myself
