= Derek Chang =

Taiwanese actor

- 張軒睿
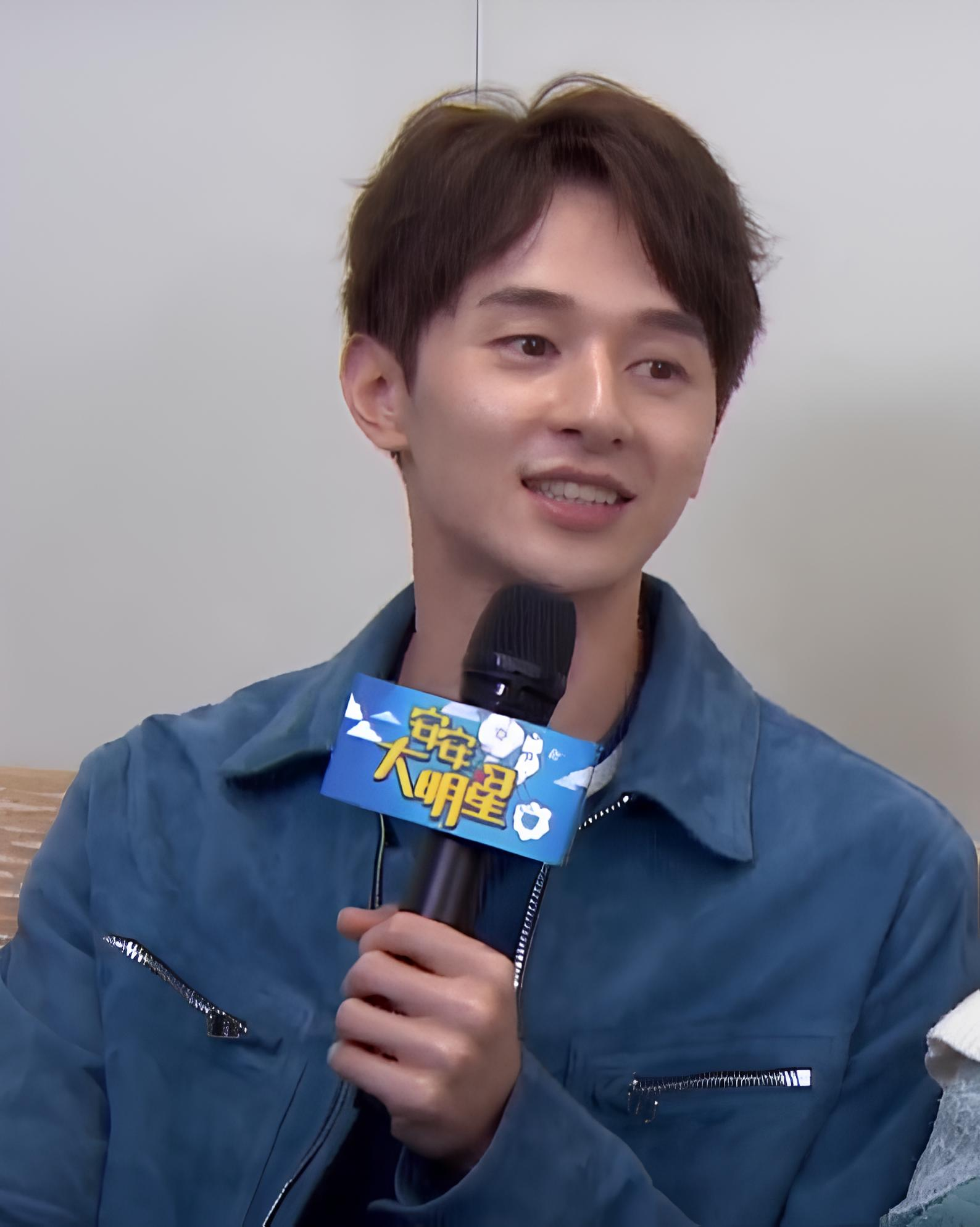
- Chang in 2019
- Born: Chang Hsuan-jui; 17 December 1992 (age 33); Taipei, Taiwan
- Education: HungKuo Delin University of Technology (BS)
- Occupations: Actor, model
- Years active: 2016–present
- Height: 183 cm (6 ft 0 in)

Chinese name
- Traditional Chinese: 張軒睿
- Simplified Chinese: 张轩睿
Transcriptions
Standard Mandarin
- Hanyu Pinyin: Zhāng Xuānruì
Yue: Cantonese
- Jyutping: Zoeng1 Hin1 Jeoi6
Southern Min
- Hokkien POJ: Tiuⁿ Hian-jōe

Derek Chang or Chang Hsuan-jui (Chinese: 張軒睿; pinyin: Zhāng Xuānruì; Pe̍h-ōe-jī: Tiuⁿ Hian-jōe, born 17 December 1992) is a Taiwanese actor. He is known for his role as Du Zhe-ming in the hit TV series Prince of Wolf (2016). In 2018, He was also nominated for the Best Leading Actor in a TV Series at the 53rd Golden Bell Awards for his performance in My Dear Boy.

== Early life ==
Derek was born on 17 December 1992 in Taipei, Taiwan.

In 2015, Derek donated 45% of his liver to his father who had liver cancer. After the operation, he lived on a light diet and exercised frequently until his body recovered.

== Career ==
=== 2016–2017: Beginnings as new actor ===
In 2016, Derek rose to national and regional prominence overnight for his role as Zhe Ming ("Little Wolf") in the hit TV series Prince of Wolf. Prince of Wolf enjoyed unprecedented success in East and Southeast Asian countries. He was called as "National Little Brother" or "National Boyfriend". In the same year, Chang appeared in highly rated TV series Stay with Me which stars with Joe Chen, Wang Kai in the play as Joe Chen's younger brother.

In May 2017, Derek played the leading role in "My Dear Boy" with Ruby Lin. For his performance, he was nominated at 53rd Golden Bell Awards for Best Leading Actor in a TV Series.

=== 2019–2026 present: Rising popularity ===
In 2019, Chang he participated in the mainland Mango TV program "Meeting Mr. Right" and officially interacted with Selina Jen

In 2019, Chang starred in the family drama Yong-Jiu Grocery Store, based on comic by Yan Guangmin. The drama was a success and achieved a cult following. It has a score of 8.5 points on Douban

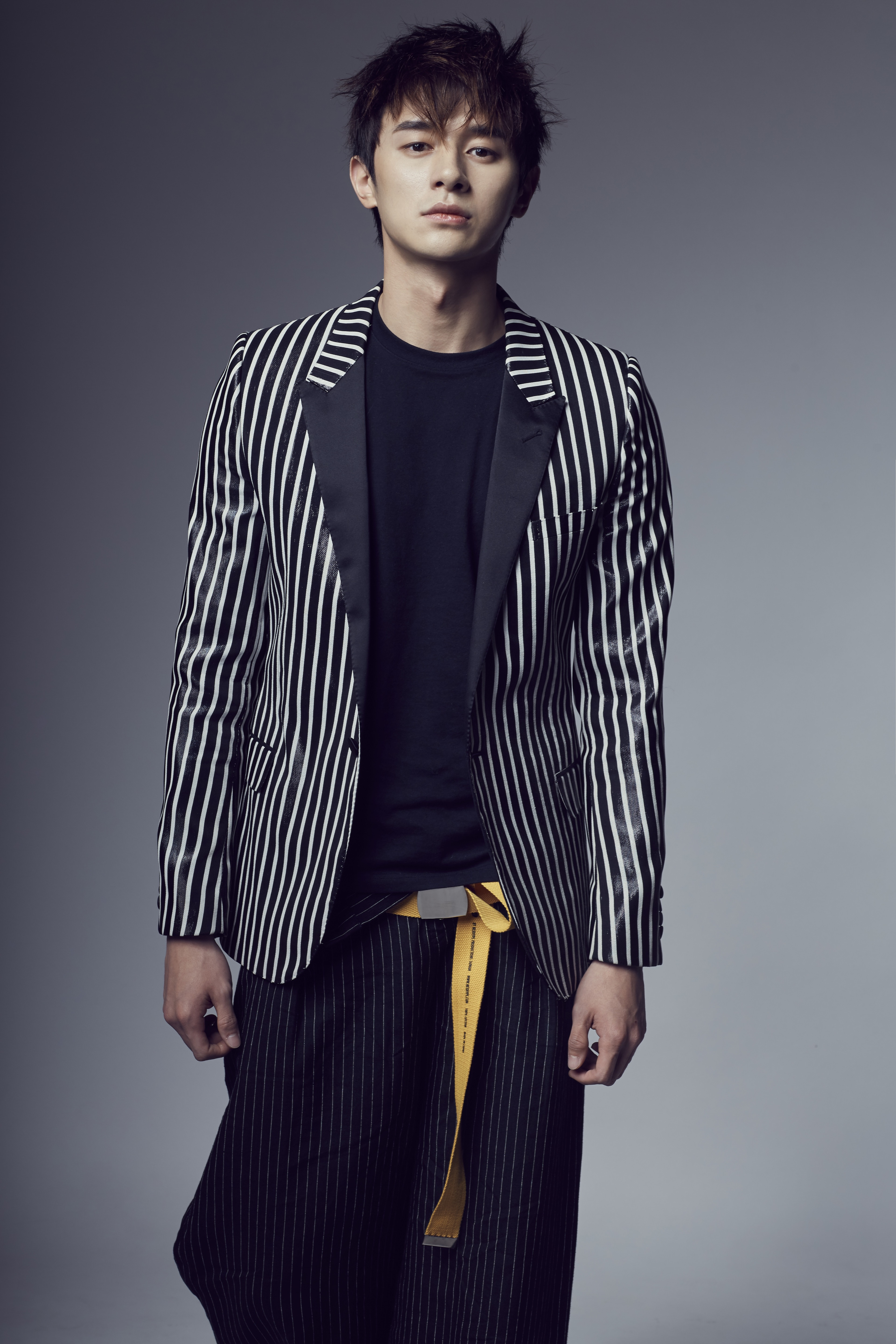
Derek Chang stars on the cover of magazine

== Filmography ==
=== Film ===
| Year | English title | Chinese title | Role | Notes |
|---|---|---|---|---|
| 2019 | Big Three Dragons | 大三元 | Sheng Xiaobai | |
| 2021 | Visitors | 訪客 | Han Yujie | |
| 2025 | Mudborn | 泥娃娃 | A-Sheng | |

=== Television series ===
| Year | English title | Chinese title | Role | Notes |
|---|---|---|---|---|
| 2016 | Prince of Wolf | 狼王子 | Du Zhe Ming | |
| 2016 | V-Focus | 獨家保鑣 | Tiger | |
| 2016 | Stay with Me | 放弃我, 抓紧我 | Zhang Li'ao (Leo) | |
| 2017 | My Dear Boy | 我的男孩 | An Qinghui | |
| 2017 | The Man From the Future | 我的未來男友 | Nan Gongyu | |
| 2017 | Be with You | 不得不愛 | Wang Shuwei | |
| 2019 | Yong-Jiu Grocery Store | 用九柑仔店 | Yang Chun-lung | |
| 2019 | Love The Way You Are | 身為一個胖子 | Ruan Dongshen | |
| 2021 | Light the Night | 華燈初上 | He Yu-en | |
| 2022 | So It's You | 原来是你 | Li Junchen | |
| 2023 | Oh No! Here Comes Trouble | 不良執念清除師 | Zhuang He-zhen | |
| 2023 | At the Moment | 此時此刻 | Huang Shao-kuang | |
| 2024 | The Floating Generation | 島嶼協奏曲 | Chen Xinhong | Hong Kong TV series |
| 2024 | You Are My Sister | 妳是我的姐妹 | Bai Yi | |
| 2024 | Love Between Unlove | 不愛，愛 | Liao Zhi-hao | |
| 2024 | Who's The Boss | 祕書俱樂部 | Meng Heng | |
| TBA | Rent Real Boy | 張立昂張軒睿 | Zhao Shu-Kho | |
| TBA | Doctor Love | 章廣辰楊銘威 | Dr Jing Shao | |

=== Reality show ===
| Year | English title | Original title | Role |
|---|---|---|---|
| 2019 | Meeting Mr. Right | 女兒們的戀愛 | with Selina Ren |
| 2019 | Three Piglets | 阮三個 | Host |

== Awards and nominations ==
| Year | Award | Category | Nominated work | Result | Ref. |
|---|---|---|---|---|---|
| 2016 | 5th Sanlih Drama Awards | Best Actor | Prince of Wolf | Nominated | |
| 2016 | 5th Sanlih Drama Awards | Best Kiss Award (with Amber An) | Prince of Wolf | Won | |
| 2016 | 5th Sanlih Drama Awards | Best Screen Couple Award (with Amber An) | Prince of Wolf | Nominated | |
| 2016 | 5th Sanlih Drama Awards | Best Crying Award (with Amber An) | Prince of Wolf | Nominated | |
| 2016 | 5th Sanlih Drama Awards | Best Potential Award | Prince of Wolf | Nominated | |
| 2018 | 53rd Golden Bell Awards | Best Leading Actor in a TV Series | My Dear Boy | Nominated | |
| 2019 | 54th Golden Bell Awards | Best Host for a Reality or Game Show | Three Piglets (shared with:Yang Kuei-mei, Soac Liu) | Nominated | |
| 2020 | 2nd Asian Academy Creative Awards | Best Lifestyle, Entertainment Presenter/Host | Three Piglets (shared with:Yang Kuei-mei, Soac Liu) | Won | |
