= Faces of Paranoia =

2014 studio album by A-Mei

Studio album by A-Mei
- Released: July 2, 2014
- Recorded: 89 Studio
- Genres: Pop; EDM
- Length: 40:05
- Label: EMI
- Producers: A-Mei; Adia

A-Mei chronology
R U Watching? (2011)	Faces of Paranoia (2014)	Amit 2 (2015)

Singles from Faces of Paranoia
- 1. "March" Released: June 23, 2014; 2. "Jump In" Released: July 2, 2014; 3. "Do You Still Want to Love Me" Released: July 19, 2014

Faces of Paranoia (Chinese: 偏執面) is the seventeenth studio album by Taiwanese recording artist A-Mei. It was released on July 2, 2014, by EMI and Universal Music. The album was originally scheduled to be released on July 4, 2014, but due to the audio files being leaked online, it was announced that the album would be released two days earlier. It was jointly produced by A-Mei and Adia, and contains a total of ten songs. The album continues the concept of the first and second half of her previous work R U Watching? (2011), since the first half of the album contains slow-tempo songs while the second half contains upbeat ones.

Faces of Paranoia received positive reviews from music critics, who commended its production and hailed it as one of her strongest efforts in her discography. The record sold more than 50,000 copies in Taiwan, becoming the year's third highest-selling album by a female artist and the year's sixth highest-selling album overall in the country.

The album earned three Golden Melody Award nominations at the 26th Golden Melody Awards the following year, where she won the award for Best Female Mandarin Singer. While the album's graphic designer Joe Fang was nominated for Best Album Design, and the album's title track was nominated for Song of the Year. On April 4, 2015, A-Mei embarked on her seventh major solo concert tour, the Utopia World Tour, in Taipei and ended the tour in December 2017 in Shanghai.

== Background and development ==
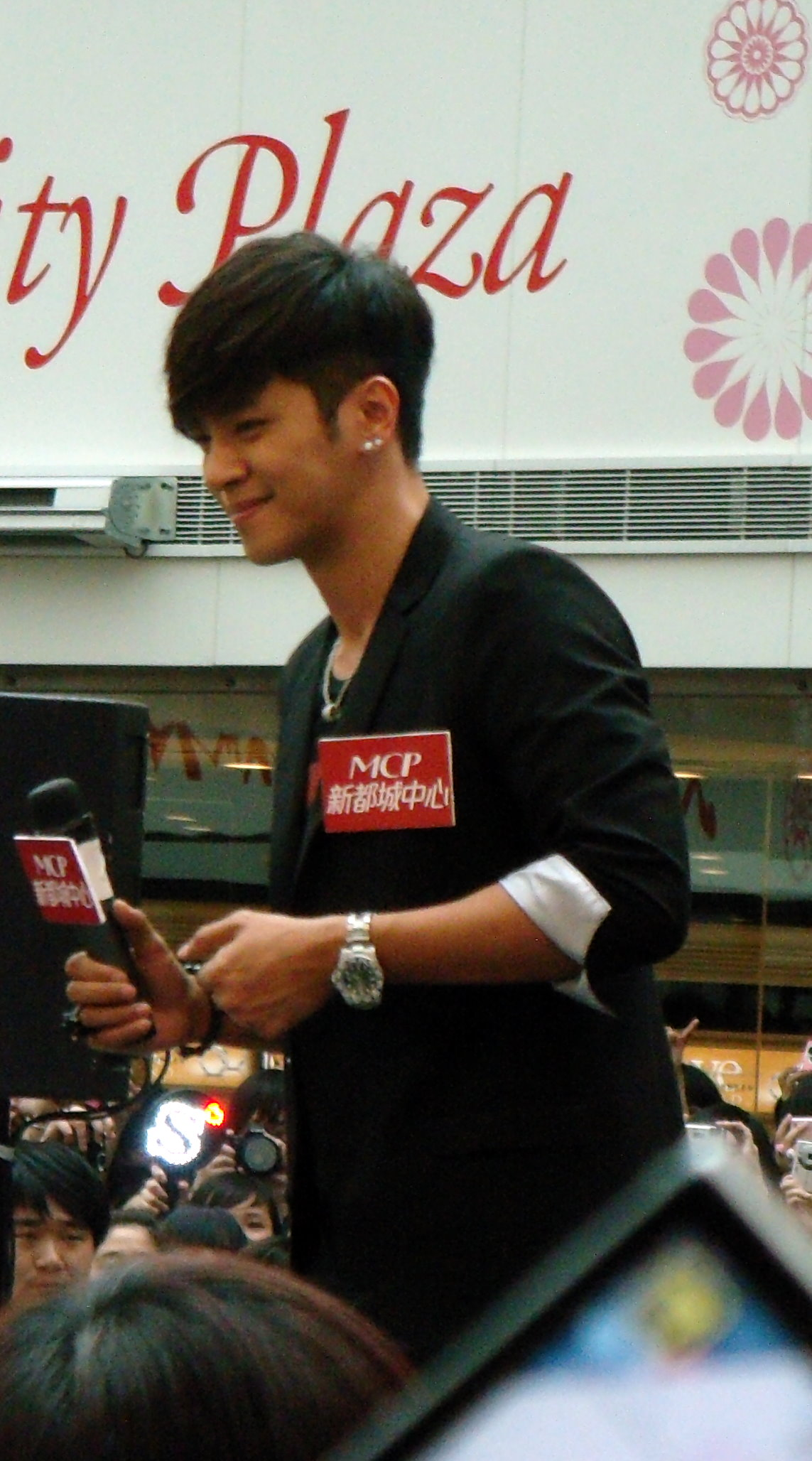
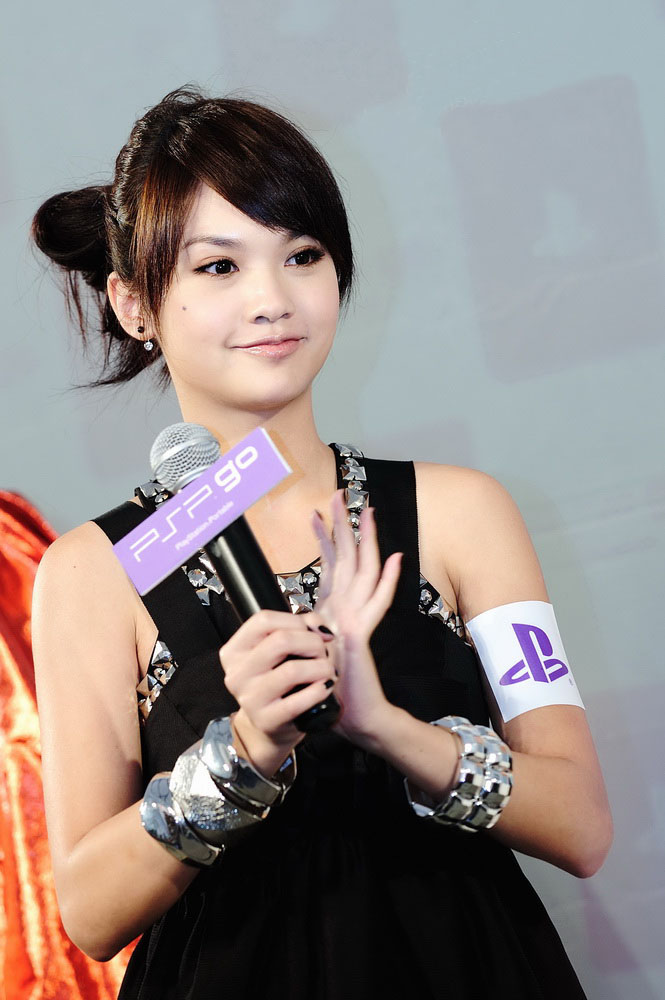
After A-Mei was named the brand director of EMI Taiwan she announced that Show Lo (left) and Rainie Yang (right) have joined the company

On April 23, 2011, A-Mei released her sixteenth solo album R U Watching?. It sold more than 60,000 copies in Taiwan, and it became the year's third highest-selling album by a female artist and the year's fifth highest-selling album overall in the country. It received four Golden Melody Award nominations at the 23rd Golden Melody Awards, including Best Female Mandarin Singer and Best Album Packaging. From September 3, 2011, to March 30, 2013, A-Mei performed 59 shows on her AMeiZING World Tour. The tour began in Chengdu, and ended in Hangzhou.

After Universal Music Group acquired EMI in 2012, it became one of Universal's record labels. In June 2014, A-Mei signed a recording deal with EMI Taiwan and was selected as the chief brand officer for the record label. As the brand director of Greater China she also announced that Show Lo and Rainie Yang have joined the company. For the ten songs on Faces of Paranoia, A-Mei spent nearly two years recording alone. During this period, she felt the direction was incorrect and all the songs were re-recorded. In order to find the most suitable voice expression, A-Mei once locked herself in the recording studio and tried to interpret it with several different singing methods.

== Writing and production ==
The album Faces of Paranoia was recorded at 89 Studio and was mastered by Ted Jensen at Sterling Sound in New York City. A-Mei invited a number of young songwriters to collaborate on with her for the album. "Right as Wrong", the first song to be featured on the album, was the first time Xiao Yu and A-Mei collaborated. The song is one of the smoothest songs on the entire album, with the songwriting portion of the song having been revised only twice, and not a single word of the lyrics were changed. The eponymous song "Faces of Paranoia," with lyrics provided by Soft Lipa, became the centerpiece of the album, demonstrating the existence of love with overbearing paranoia, which made A-Mei fall in love with it as soon as she acquired it. It was very rare for her to sing the lyrics without changing a single word, and it was completed in a single take. The song "Jump In" is a collaboration between A-Mei and Miss Ko, inspired by the two jumping up and down with each other at the 2014 Superstar Red & White Entertainment Awards.

As the first song in the entire album, "Right as Wrong" is a light and medium-tempo song. "Do You Still Want to Love Me" has a piano Brit-rock inspired arrangement with a little cello and synth-keyboard liltings along with a two-minute ending. "March" is a piano driven pop ballad. Like the song "My Dearest" from A-Mei's last album R U Watching?, "March" is interpreted with different singing styles in a minimalist arrangement, presenting the song's rich layers and heartfelt words and phrases. "Autosadism" is another Brit-rock influenced track but the atmosphere is completely different. The album's title track, which features the rapper Soft Lipa, is inspired by hip hop and EDM.

The album's seventh track "Dog" tells the story of a lover having an affair, tying it in to the story of them agreeing to buy a dog together and then cleverly making a reference to the third person as a female dog. The track "Booty Call" merges the genres of EDM and dubstep. "Fly High" is an upbeat and EDM infused track that is inspired by reggae music. "Heading Utopia" is an electropop track with a futuristic atmosphere.

== Title and artwork ==
The album title "Faces of Paranoia " was chosen because of A-Mei's varieties of paranoias. No one knew that she suffered from a serious phobia of crowds when she gets off the stage. During the hours when she did not work, she stayed at home and lived in deep seclusion. Her days and nights were turned upside down, and she frequently was unable to sleep in the middle of the night in a panic, and then sank into a deep sleep when she saw the sunlight. This unexplained illness accompanied her every night. Her fault-finding in music, her dedication to her work, and the enormous pressure on herself; A-Mei was always smiling in front of people, full of confidence, but all the emotions and pressure could not find an outlet. And no one could share her worries, so she could only go home again and again to face it alone, which, over time, created the paranoid side of her insanity: stubborn, manic-depressive, and neurotic.

For the styling section, Fame Glory, a cutting-edge styling team from Hong Kong who was responsible for the main visual of the 32nd anniversary Hong Kong Film Awards, was specially invited. Art director Ma Tianyou gathered stylists from the mainland, Hong Kong, Taiwan, France, Italy, the United Kingdom and other places to create tailor-make exclusive styling clothing for A-Mei.

The graphic designer of the album decided to use white, which represents nervousness, as the tone from the very beginning. For the photoshoot A-Mei dyed her hair silver-white, while wearing all-white clothes, standing all-white backgrounds, white and white non-stop cover stacking, as well as a variety of shades of white and bright white printing techniques. As for the printing technique, the inner page of the album lyrics is an unprecedented use of one kind of paper material for each song, so that the temperature and touch of each paper match each song.

== Release and promotion ==
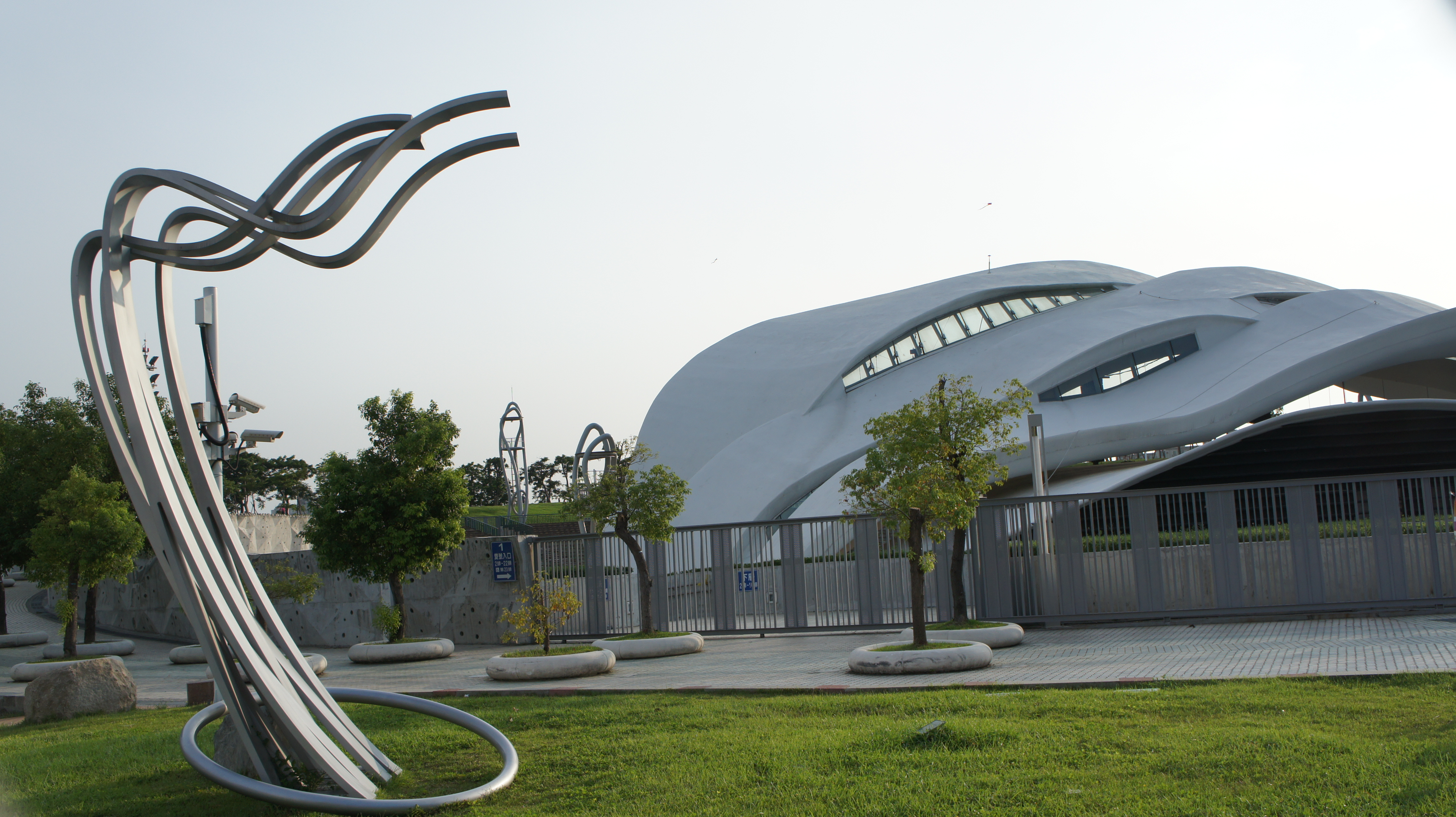
On August 31, 2014, A-Mei held a free concert at Fulfillment Amphitheater to promote the album

The record was originally meant to be released on July 4, 2014. However, Migu Music, which is affiliated with China Mobile, leaked all of the songs from Faces of Paranoia on the afternoon of June 30, 2014. In addition to providing online listening to all songs, netizens could even download them freely. A-Mei was both angry and upset, but immediately decided to have the album released early on July 2, and her company Mei Entertainment would also hold the manufacturer legally responsible. On August 24, 2014, A-Mei held a press conference in Shanghai to promote the album. The album's upbeat songs "Dog," "Booty Call," and "Fly High" boldly depict male-female love. Originally, she was worried that the content of the lyrics would not be approved by mainland China, but it turned out that she did not have to cut any of the lyrics.

The album reportedly sold over 30,000 copies in Taiwan within a month of its release. As of December 31, 2014, it had sold more than 50,000 copies in Taiwan, making it the year's third highest-selling album by a female artist and the year's sixth highest-selling album overall in the country. In 2014, it reached number nine on the annual album sales chart of Five Music. To celebrate the commercial success of Faces of Paranoia, A-Mei held a concert at Taichung's Fulfillment Amphitheater on August 31, 2014. 6,000 free tickets were sold out in a flash, so the organizers opened up the grassland area, attracting 30,000 people to the venue to listen to the concert. Not only was the venue full, but the lawn outside the arena was teeming with fans as well. The concert was broadcast simultaneously to a few countries around the globe via Tencent Video's exclusive live webcast cooperation, and it was estimated that hundreds of millions of viewers around the world watched A-Mei's show.

=== Singles and music videos ===
On June 18, 2014, the lead single "March" was released along with its lyric video. On July 4, 2014, The official music video of "March" was released. The music video for "March" went through two shoots, as A-Mei was not satisfied with the first completed video, so she asked for a re-shoot. A-Mei requested that the music video for the song be simple, as long as the mood was right, and the director of the music video filmed the entire song with only close-ups of her face according to A-Mei's request. The music video for "Faces of Paranoia" was partly shot in an abandoned psychiatric hospital and touched upon taboo subjects, including domestic violence. The video uses three love stories to present A-Mei's lyrics, from the violent wedding couple to the pale lovers in the morgue, all stemming from the tragic paranoia about love.

The music video for "Do You Still Want to Love Me" was directed by Jude Chen and Hi-Organic. The music video for "Autosadism" was directed by Kevin Ko and Pocato Su. The music video for "Jump In" was directed by Hi-Organic and Kuo Chih-da; it features A-Mei and her backup dancers performing in a dance studio filled with spotlights. The choreography for the "Jump In" video was done by Cameron Lee. In order to meet the fast-paced style of "Jump In", A-Mei also invited an American dance teacher to design a street-dance style dance and released a demonstration of the instructional video, so fans of the song can follow along with the dance. The music video for "Dog" was directed by Lin Yan Ting. The music video for "Booty Call" is essentially edited footage of A-Mei singing the songs. The music video for "Heading Utopia" was also directed by Lin Yan Ting. The only songs from the album to not get an accompanying music video are "Right as Wrong" and "Fly High."

In January 2015, "March," "Do You Still Want to Love Me" and "Jump In" were listed at number seven, number twenty-seven and number fifty-one on the 2014 Hit FM Top 100 Singles of the Year chart, respectively.

=== Touring ===
On December 28, 2014, A-Mei began selling tickets for the Utopia World Tour concerts to be held at Taipei Arena in April 2015. Not only did the singer set a new record for solo artists and Chinese singers with ten consecutive performances, but also set a new ticket record for a solo artist in the Chinese music industry with 120,000 tickets being sold out in 12 minutes. In addition, a precedent was set for Asian singers to introduce customized chip card tickets from Italy. Each Utopia Citizenship Card was custom-made in Italy, printed with the holder's name and a different color for each show at a cost of €1.5 (about NT$59.4). The company also spent NT$4 million to rent a powerful server from Amazon to prevent Internet traffic jams, spending a total of NT$23.2 million on pre-sale operations alone, which is the most for any concert in the Chinese-language music industry. Ten shows at the Little Big Dome grossed NT$300 million, and together with the 22 shows in mainland China, the box office for the tour was estimated to be NT$2.7 billion.

== Critical reception ==
Professional ratings
Review scores
Source	Rating
The Straits Times	4.5/5 stars
PlayMusic	3.4/5 stars

The album received generally positive reviews upon release. Boon Chan of The Straits Times awarded the album with 4.5 stars out of 5, calling it one of her strongest. He praised the commercial appeal of the songs and stated that they were so well-made that most of them could've been hit singles. He added, "She asks on one track Will You Still Want To Love Me Like This. When the music is this good, the answer is a rousing yes."

PlayMusic's critic She Says gave the album 3 and a half stars out of 5 stars, she added: "Overall, this is a completely new and surprising album. If you're looking for the familiar A-Mei, you may be disappointed!" Writing for NetEase, Silent Phone commented: "What needs to be emphasized here in Faces of Paranoia is that the latter five tracks are of high quality, and if you put all the chaotic, mutually constraining concepts aside, it's really a half-dozen electronic works that deserve to be selected as the best of the year."

Liu Shuiji commented: "A-Mei didn't waste this stage of her life, when she was able to enjoy a great deal of autonomy, and that's why she came up with this work. Maybe she'll go back to her old ways of fast songs and slow songs with the best resources in the Chinese music industry, but this time, in Faces of Paranoia, she perfectly interprets herself as both a singer and a woman, opening up to an imperfect, scarred, and shocking soul that is indulgent enough to be wild and captivating."

== Accolades ==
In 2015, the album's title track was nominated for Song of the Year at the 26th Golden Melody Awards. At the same award ceremony, A-Mei took home the award for Best Female Mandarin Singer.

== Track listing ==
Faces of Paranoia track listing
No.	Title	Lyrics	Music	Arranger(s)	Length
1.	"Right as Wrong" (都對也都錯)	Li Ruojun	Xiao Yu	Starr Chen; Kang Youwei	3:33
2.	"Do You Still Want to Love Me" (這樣你還要愛我嗎)	Li Ruojun	Chris Braide; Carl Falk; Sharon Vaughn	Joshua Leung	6:16
3.	"March" (三月)	Kevin Yi	Joshua Leung	Joshua Leung	3:48
4.	"Autosadism" (自虐)	Isaac Chen	Tangor	Liao Weijie	5:12
5.	"Faces of Paranoia" (偏執面)	Soft Lipa; Huang Zhou	Starr Chen; Kang Youwei	Adia	4:14
6.	"Jump In" (跳進來)	Miss Ko	Miss Ko	RAZOR Chiang	3:03
7.	"Dog" (狗)	Arys Chien; Isaac Chen	Arys Chien	RAZOR Chiang	3:30
8.	"Booty Call"	Isaac Chen	Starr Chen	Starr Chen	3:10
9.	"Fly High" (飛高高)	Adia	Starr Chen; Liao Weijie	Starr Chen; Liao Weijie	3:30
10.	"Heading Utopia" (前進烏托邦)	Isaac Chen	Daniel Traynor; Matt Schwartz; Ana Diaz; Agnes	Starr Chen; Kang Youwei	3:51
Total length:					40:05

== Charts ==
=== Weekly charts ===
Chart (2014)	Peak position
Hong Kong Albums (HKRMA)	6
Taiwanese Albums (G-Music)	2

=== Year-end charts ===
Chart (2014)	Position
Taiwanese Albums (Note: Best-selling albums of the year in Taiwan as reported by media outlets)	6
