= TFCF =

TFCF may refer to:

- TFCF (album), an album by the band Liars, short for Theme From Crying Fountain
- Taiwan Fund for Children and Families, an organization in Taiwan
- 21st Century Fox, Class B was publicly traded on Nasdaq as TFCF in 2019
