= Lin Yixiong =

Lin Yixiong (林義雄, 林义雄) may refer to:

- Lin Yixiong, Chinese badminton player, see 1979 WBF World Championships
- Lin I-hsiung (born 1936), Taiwanese actor who cast in Taiwanese television series Yong-Jiu Grocery Store and film Moneyboys
- Lin Yi-hsiung (born 1941), Taiwanese politician
- Yoshio Hayashi (1905-2010), Japanese painter for children, see Shigeo Fukuda
