= Jump In (song) =

Single by A-Mei

from the album Faces of Paranoia
- Language: Mandarin
- Released: July 2, 2014
- Genre: Dance-pop; electropop
- Length: 3:02
- Label: EMI; Universal Music Taiwan
- Composer(s): Razor Chiang
- Lyricist(s): Miss Ko
- Producer(s): A-Mei

Music videos
- "Jump In" on YouTube
- "Jump In" (dance video) on YouTube

"Jump In" (Chinese: 跳進來; pinyin: Tiào jìnlái) is a song by Taiwanese singer A-Mei for her seventeenth studio album, Faces of Paranoia (2014). It was released on July 2, 2014, as the album's lead single by Universal Music Taiwan, while its accompanying music video was released on July 28, 2014. The song is also the Chinese promotional song for The Expendables 3.

== Background ==
The song is the first collaboration between Miss Ko and A-Mei. Miss Ko said that she had spent half a year composing the song because of the pressure, but after going to the US and returning to Taiwan, she delivered the demo version of "Jump In", and she also said that she had observed that A-Mei loved to listen to fast songs, and she liked to scratch her hair when she danced, as if she was falling into her own world, and it took her only half an hour to complete the composition. In order to meet the fast-paced style of "Jump In", A-Mei also invited an American dance teacher to design a street-dance style dance and released a demonstration of the instructional video, so fans of the song can follow along with the dance.

== Reception ==
After the release of "Jump In", A-Mei said she hoped to reach 10 million views on various music platforms on her birthday, August 9. To achieve this, KKBOX in Taiwan launched 10 million member invitations on that day. More than one million users responded; in China, 9 million pushes and 70 million private messages were delivered by TTPOD (天天動聽) and NetEaseCloudMusic, with a total of more than 9.5 million views across both platforms in China, and a combined total of more than 12 million views across other platforms. Rock Mobile Taiwan (台灣滾石移動), the digital cooperation team, said, "The cumulative 24-hour hit rate is about 12%, has exceeded 12 million times, of which more than 10% are Taiwanese fans. After hearing the news, A-Mei said through her manager, "The album that I have been working on for a long time has a good return, and it will give me more confidence to produce better works".

== In popular culture ==
After the release of the song, it became a hit in Taiwan nightclubs. A-Mei said, "In order to make the music video, I even asked an American dance teacher to choreograph and teach street dance", and "Jump in" is also the best response to the album "Faces of Paranoia" since its release. It has become the most popular song in nightclubs, and has also started a wave of Taiwanese people learning to dance.

== Release history ==
Region	Date	Formats	Label
Various	July 2, 2014	Digital download, streaming	Universal Music Taiwan
