= Hello Again =

Hello Again may refer to:

== Music ==
- "Hello, Again", a song by Tommy Bolin from the 1976 album Private Eyes
- "Hello Again" (Neil Diamond song), a song by Neil Diamond from the 1980 The Jazz Singer
- Hello Again, a 1984 album by Howard Carpendale, and the title song
- "Hello Again" (The Cars song), a song by The Cars from the 1984 album Heartbeat City
- "Hello, Again" (Mukashi kara Aru Basho), a song by Japanese band My Little Lover from the 1995 album Evergreen
- "Hello Again", a song by Hoobastank from the 2001 album Hoobastank
- "Hello Again", a song by Lostprophets from the 2004 album Start Something
- "Hello Again", a song by the Dave Matthews Band from the 2005 album Stand Up

== Film, stage and television ==
- Hello Again (1987 film), a comedy film starring Shelley Long and Corbin Bernsen
- Hello Again (2017 film), a musical film starring Audra McDonald, based on Michael John LaChuisa's musical
- Hello Again (musical), a 1994 off-Broadway musical by Michael John LaChuisa, based on Arthur Schintzler's play "La Ronde"
- Hello Again!, a 2019 Taiwanese television series
- "Hello Again" (Just Good Friends), a 1983 television episode
