= My Dear Boy =

- Promotional poster
- Also known as: My Boy
- Traditional Chinese: 我的男孩
- Simplified Chinese: 我的男孩
- Hanyu Pinyin: Wǒ De Nán Hái
- Genre: Romance
- Written by: Mag Hsu (徐譽庭)
- Directed by: Hsu Fu-chun (徐輔軍)
- Starring: Ruby Lin: Derek Chang; Archie Kao; Lee Lee-zen
- Opening theme: 溫柔的奇蹟 - FanFan
- Ending theme: 不需要知道- William Wei
- Country of origin: Taiwan
- Original language: Mandarin
- No. of episodes: 20

Production
- Producers: Ruby Lin; Lisa Tan
- Production location: Taiwan
- Running time: 90 minutes (per episode)
- Production companies: Ruby Lin Studio; Gala Television

Original release
- Network: TTV Main Channel; GTV
- Release: December 22, 2017 – May 11, 2018

Related
- Q series; The Ex-Man

My Dear Boy (Chinese: 我的男孩) is a 2017 Taiwanese television series produced by Ruby Lin and Lisa Tan (Lin's agent) written by Mag Hsu and directed by Hsu Fu-chun. This 20-episode series premiered on TTV and GTV in December 2017.

== Plot ==
It takes a tremendous amount of courage to make changes to your personal and professional lives. Luo Xiao Fei works as a director of television commercials and An Qing Hui, who is pursuing college a design degree. Luo Xiao Fei Starts as a mentor then friend and finally love interest. The story has a Noona feel with various love triangles. Unlike many Noona stories it shows the difficulties of a May/December romance with the woman being older. You will fall in love with the main characters and supporting characters. Everyone has a point of view and you will be sympathetic with them all. There's also comedic moments between the tears.

== Cast ==
=== Main cast ===
- Ruby Lin as Luo Xiao Fei
- Derek Chang as An Qing Hui
- Archie Kao as Xiao Ye Shi
- Lee Lee-zen as Xiao Lai

=== Supporting cast ===
- Wen Chen-ling as Pan Yan Ting
- Cheryl Yang as Mei Shuang
- Jessie Chang as Luo Xiao Shan
- Easton Dong (Dong Ming-Hsian or Tung Ming-Hsiang) as Xiao Fei's Brother-in-Law, Cheng-Cheng (政誠)
- Elsa Ge as Xiao Nian Shi
- Qu Zhong Heng as An Qing Hui's Father
- Yen Yi-Wen as An Qing Hui's Mother
- Greg Hsu as Nicholai
- Zhang Guang Chen as Gao Pi
- Aaron Chan as An Qing Hui's Uncle
- Pang Yong Zhi as Li Da Bao
- Peter Lee as Zhang Wei Jie
- Ahn Zhe as Miaomiao
- Cosmos Lin as Amy

=== Guest appearance ===
- Hsieh Chiung-hsuan
- Melody (Yin Yue)
- Heaven Hai as Wei-wei
- Hsu Wei-ning
- Melvin Sia

== Production ==
A press conference for the series was held in Taipei, Taiwan, on 31 May 2017. Filming ended on 19 October 2017.

== Soundtrack ==
Type	Title	Singer(s)	Lyricist	Songwriter
Opening Song	"Wen Rou De Qi Ji" (溫柔的奇蹟; "Gentle Miracle")	FanFan	Feifei	Chen Hsiao chuan
Ending Song	"Bu Xu Yao Zhi Dao" (不需要知道; "You Don't Need To Know")	William Wei		
Insert song	"He Zi Ji Xiang Yu" (和自己相遇; "Alone With Myself")	Pets Tseng	Xiao Han	Yong Qiao Jun
Insert song	"Wo Yi Ran Shi Wo" (我依然是我; "I'm Still Here")	Rennie Wang		
Insert song	"Wu Qiong" (無窮; "Endlessness")	Fang Wu		
	"Boom, Boom" (Episode 2 scene with basketball team captain asking Shampoo aka Pan Yan-Ting to be his girlfriend)	Anacron		

== Ratings ==
Competing dramas on rival channels airing at the same time slot were:
- FTV - Intern Doctor
- SET Metro - Iron Ladies
- SET Taiwan - Father's Wish (re-run)

Air Date	Episode	Average Ratings	Rank
December 22, 2017	1	0.50	3
December 29, 2017	2	0.59	3
January 5, 2018	3	0.56	3
January 12, 2018	4	0.54	4
January 19, 2018	5	0.67	4
January 26, 2018	6	1.03	1
February 2, 2018	7	0.84	4
February 9, 2018	8	0.87	4
February 16, 2018: No episode was aired due to TTV airing of Chinese New Year Special Program
February 23, 2018	9	0.69	4
March 2, 2018	10	0.71	4
March 9, 2018	11	0.71	4
March 16, 2018	12	0.89	4
March 23, 2018	13	0.78	4
March 30, 2018	14	0.69	4
April 6, 2018	15	0.86	4
April 13, 2018	16	0.76	4
April 20, 2018	17	1.01	2
April 27, 2018	18	0.93	3
May 5, 2018	19	0.89	3
May 11, 2018	20	1.25	2
Average ratings		0.79	--
