= ASMR World Tour =

2022–2025 concert tour by A-Mei

- Tour by A-Mei
- Location: Asia; Europe; North America; Oceania
- Associated album: Various
- Start date: April 1, 2022
- End date: May 31, 2025
- Legs: 2
- No. of shows: 73

A-Mei concert chronology
- Utopia World Tour (2015–17); ASMR World Tour (2022–25)

The ASMR World Tour is the eighth concert tour by Taiwanese singer A-Mei. The tour began in with twelve concerts at the Taipei Arena in Taipei on April 1, 2022, and expanded into North America, Oceania and Europe. An extension of the tour, titled ASMR Max, commenced in Nanjing, China on May 11, 2024.

== Commercial performance ==
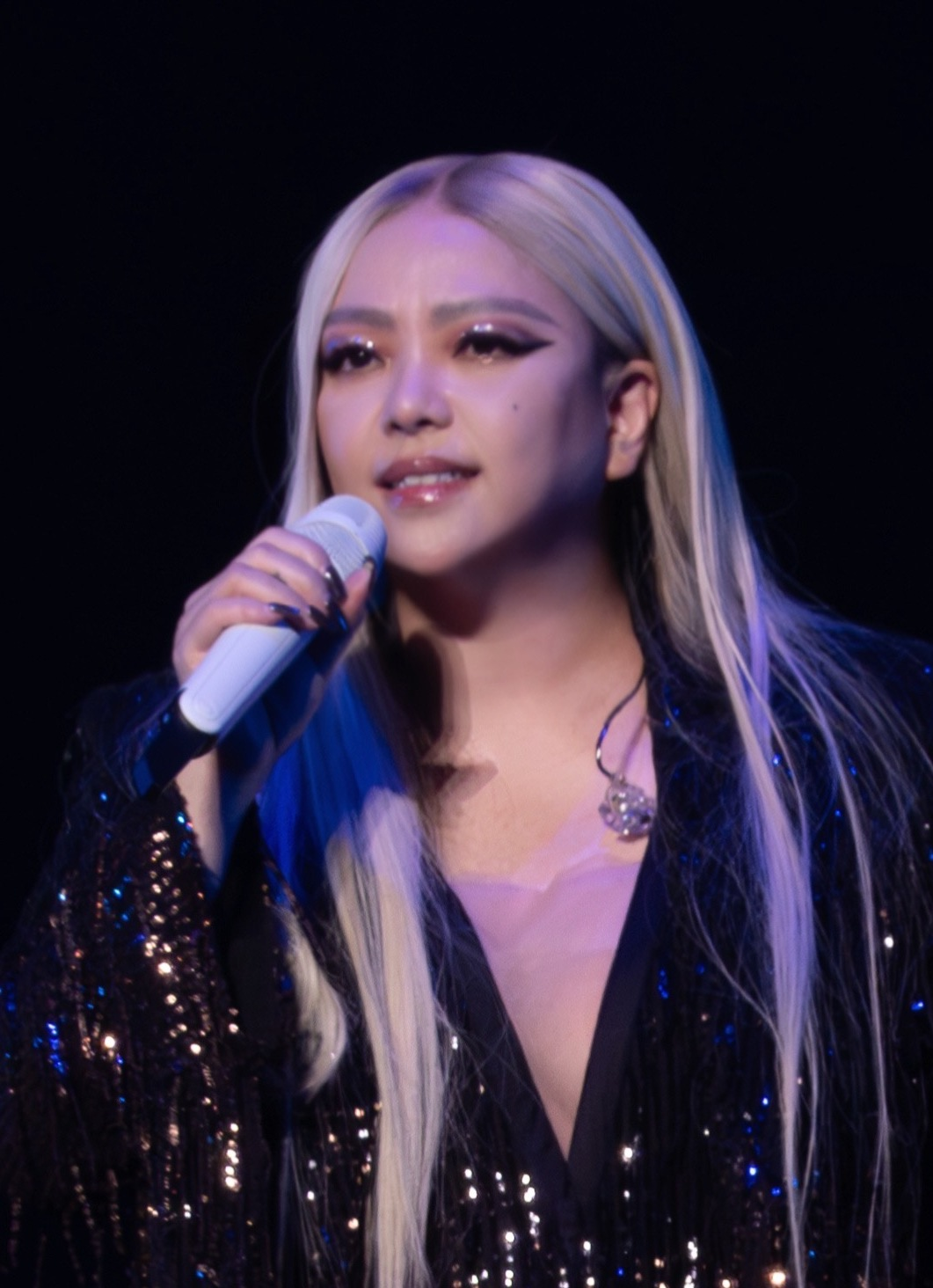
A-Mei performing in Zhengzhou

On January 1, 2022, it was announced that 130,000 tickets for the twelve dates at the Taipei Arena in April 2022 sold out in nine minutes, with 320,000 people reportedly applying for tickets. It set a record for the most number of consecutive performances by a female singer in Taiwan, and grossed an estimate total of NT$429 million (US$14 million) in revenue. The ten concerts held in Kaohsiung in April 2023 likewise sold out all 110,000 tickets in twelve minutes. The Kaohsiung concerts grossed around NT$336 million.

The tour set a record for the largest number of concerts held within a period of one year in Taiwan, with 22 concerts, as well as the largest number of attendees and box office revenue garnered within one year. The five shows at the Taipei Dome in December 2024 attracted a total of 200,000 people and generated NT$2.29 billion ($69 million) in tourism revenue.

== Tour dates ==
ASMR World Tour dates
Date	City	Country	Venue	Attendance	Revenue
April 1, 2022	Taipei	Taiwan	Taipei Arena	130,000	$14,000,000
April 2, 2022	Taipei	Taiwan	Taipei Arena	130,000	$14,000,000
April 3, 2022	Taipei	Taiwan	Taipei Arena	130,000	$14,000,000
April 5, 2022	Taipei	Taiwan	Taipei Arena	130,000	$14,000,000
April 6, 2022	Taipei	Taiwan	Taipei Arena	130,000	$14,000,000
April 8, 2022	Taipei	Taiwan	Taipei Arena	130,000	$14,000,000
April 9, 2022	Taipei	Taiwan	Taipei Arena	130,000	$14,000,000
April 10, 2022	Taipei	Taiwan	Taipei Arena	130,000	$14,000,000
April 12, 2022	Taipei	Taiwan	Taipei Arena	130,000	$14,000,000
April 13, 2022	Taipei	Taiwan	Taipei Arena	130,000	$14,000,000
April 15, 2022	Taipei	Taiwan	Taipei Arena	130,000	$14,000,000
April 16, 2022	Taipei	Taiwan	Taipei Arena	130,000	$14,000,000
December 11, 2022	Gary	United States	Hard Rock Live Northern Indiana	—	—
December 13, 2022	National Harbor	United States	The Theater at MGM National Harbor	—	—
December 17, 2022	Atlantic City	United States	Borgata Event Center	—	—
December 24, 2022	Las Vegas	United States	Dolby Live	—	—
December 25, 2022	Las Vegas	United States	Dolby Live	—	—
March 31, 2023	Kaohsiung	Taiwan	Kaohsiung Arena	120,000	$10,400,000
April 1, 2023	Kaohsiung	Taiwan	Kaohsiung Arena	120,000	$10,400,000
April 3, 2023	Kaohsiung	Taiwan	Kaohsiung Arena	120,000	$10,400,000
April 4, 2023	Kaohsiung	Taiwan	Kaohsiung Arena	120,000	$10,400,000
April 5, 2023	Kaohsiung	Taiwan	Kaohsiung Arena	120,000	$10,400,000
April 8, 2023	Kaohsiung	Taiwan	Kaohsiung Arena	120,000	$10,400,000
April 9, 2023	Kaohsiung	Taiwan	Kaohsiung Arena	120,000	$10,400,000
April 14, 2023	Kaohsiung	Taiwan	Kaohsiung Arena	120,000	$10,400,000
April 15, 2023	Kaohsiung	Taiwan	Kaohsiung Arena	120,000	$10,400,000
April 16, 2023	Kaohsiung	Taiwan	Kaohsiung Arena	120,000	$10,400,000
July 7, 2023	Singapore		Singapore Indoor Stadium	—	—
July 8, 2023	Singapore		Singapore Indoor Stadium	13,000	—
July 28, 2023	Melbourne	Australia	MCEC	—	—
July 30, 2023	Sydney	Australia	Hordern Pavilion	—	—
August 5, 2023	Beijing	China	Cadillac Center	30,000	—
August 6, 2023	Beijing	China	Cadillac Center	30,000	—
August 12, 2023	Shanghai	China	Mercedes-Benz Arena	—	—
August 13, 2023	Shanghai	China	Mercedes-Benz Arena	—	—
August 25, 2023	Kuala Lumpur	Malaysia	Axiata Arena	20,000	—
August 26, 2023	Kuala Lumpur	Malaysia	Axiata Arena	20,000	—
September 16, 2023	Macau	China	Cotai Arena	—	—
October 27, 2023	Chongqing	China	Huaxi Cultural and Sports Center	—	—
October 28, 2023	Chongqing	China	Huaxi Cultural and Sports Center	—	—
December 2, 2023	Guangzhou	China	Guangzhou International Sports Arena	—	—
December 3, 2023	Guangzhou	China	Guangzhou International Sports Arena	—	—
December 8, 2023	Wuhan	China	Wuhan Sports Center Gymnasium	—	—
December 9, 2023	Wuhan	China	Wuhan Sports Center Gymnasium	—	—
December 22, 2023	Shenzhen	China	Shenzhen Universiade Center Gymnasium	—	—
December 23, 2023	Shenzhen	China	Shenzhen Universiade Center Gymnasium	—	—
January 6, 2024	Chengdu	China	Dong'an Lake Sports Centre Gymnasium	—	—
January 7, 2024	Chengdu	China	Dong'an Lake Sports Centre Gymnasium	—	—
January 20, 2024	Zhengzhou	China	Zhengzhou Olympic Sports Center Gymnasium	30,000	—
January 21, 2024	Zhengzhou	China	Zhengzhou Olympic Sports Center Gymnasium	30,000	—
January 27, 2024	Hangzhou	China	Hangzhou Olympic Sports Center Gymnasium	—	—
January 28, 2024	Hangzhou	China	Hangzhou Olympic Sports Center Gymnasium	—	—
April 10, 2024	London	England	Wembley Arena	—	—
May 2, 2024	Tokyo	Japan	Nippon Budokan	20,000	—
May 3, 2024	Tokyo	Japan	Nippon Budokan	20,000	—

ASMR Max World Tour dates
Date	City	Country	Venue	Attendance	Revenue
May 11, 2024	Nanjing	China	Nanjing Olympic Sports Centre	30,000	—
May 25, 2024	Xianyang	China	Xianyang Olympic Sports Center Stadium	—	—
June 1, 2024	Tianjin	China	Tianjin Olympic Centre	—	—
June 15, 2024	Suzhou	China	Suzhou Olympic Sports Centre	—	—
July 27, 2024	Singapore		Singapore Indoor Stadium	15,000	—
July 28, 2024	Singapore		Singapore Indoor Stadium	15,000	—
September 7, 2024	Shanghai	China	Shanghai Stadium	160,000	—
September 8, 2024	Shanghai	China	Shanghai Stadium	160,000	—
September 21, 2024	Qingdao	China	Conson Stadium	30,000	—
October 2, 2024	Hefei	China	Hefei Olympic Sports Center Stadium	—	—
October 12, 2024	Shenyang	China	Shenyang Olympic Sports Center Stadium	—	—
November 9, 2024	Fuzhou	China	Haixia Olympic Center	—	—
November 23, 2024	Nanning	China	Guangxi Sports Center	—	—
November 30, 2024	Changsha	China	Helong Sports Center Stadium	—	—
December 7, 2024	Shenzhen	China	Shenzhen Universiade Sports Stadium	40,000	—
December 21, 2024	Taipei	Taiwan	Taipei Dome	200,000	$24,150,000
December 22, 2024	Taipei	Taiwan	Taipei Dome	200,000	$24,150,000
December 28, 2024	Taipei	Taiwan	Taipei Dome	200,000	$24,150,000
December 29, 2024	Taipei	Taiwan	Taipei Dome	200,000	$24,150,000
December 31, 2024	Taipei	Taiwan	Taipei Dome	200,000	$24,150,000
March 7, 2025	Hangzhou	China	Huanglong Sports Center	—	—
March 8, 2025	Hangzhou	China	Huanglong Sports Center	—	—
April 30, 2025	Zhengzhou	China	Zhengzhou Olympic Sports Center Stadium	—	—
May 24, 2025	Xiamen	China	Xiamen Egret Stadium	—	—
May 31, 2025	Nanchang	China	Nanchang Olympic Sports Center	—	
Total				N/A	N/A
