= Amber An =

Taiwanese actress, singer, television host, and model

- 安心亞
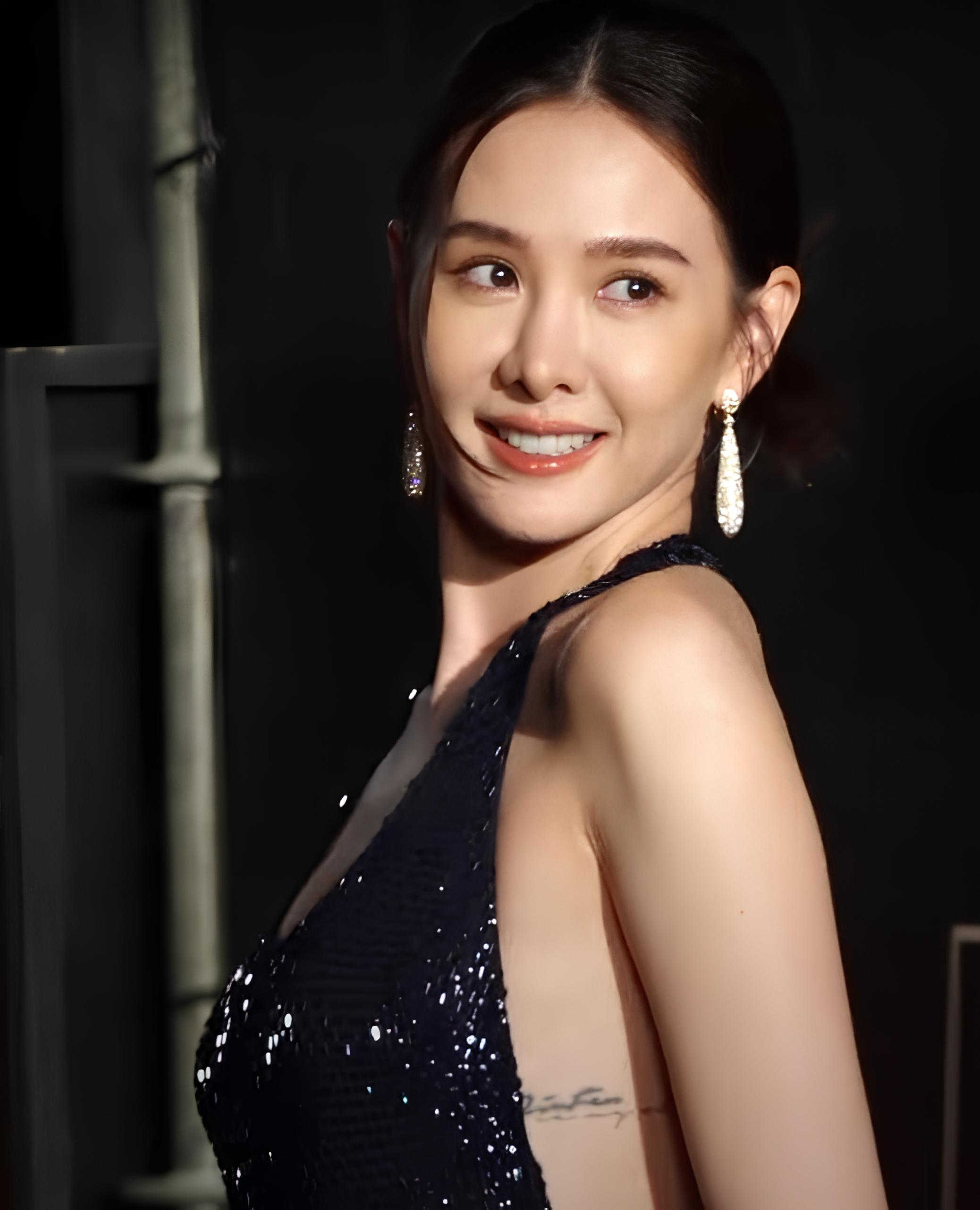
- Amber An on the red carpet of the 58th Golden Bell Awards on October 21, 2023
- Born: Liao Ching-ling; 18 September 1985 (age 40); Taichung, Taiwan
- Education: Yu Da High School of Commerce and Home Economics
- Occupations: Actress, singer, television host, model
- Years active: 2008–present
- Musical career
- Genres: Mandopop
- Instrument: Vocals
- Labels: Wonderful Music, Universal Music Taiwan

Amber An (Chinese: 安心亞; pinyin: Ān Xīnyà), born Liao Ching-ling (Chinese: 廖婧伶; pinyin: Liào Jìnglíng), is a Taiwanese actress, singer, television host, and model.

== Career ==
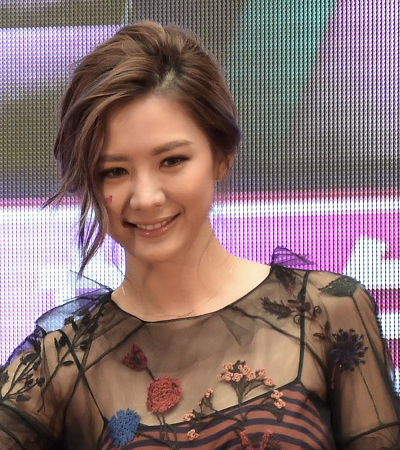
Amber An on 8 December 2016

An was a model before officially entering the entertainment industry. She appeared on the variety show Guess and subsequently signed with a company. In February 2009, An became a cast member of the political satire show Celebrity Imitated Show: The Largest Political Party, in which she impersonates other celebrities, most prominently singer Kuo Shu-yao. In 2011, An was voted the world's sexiest woman in the Taiwanese version of magazine FHM.

She released her first album in August 2011. Later that year, she signed a NT$1 million ($42,500) contract with Reebok to become the brand's Taiwanese ambassador. After a year and half in the making, An released her second album in January 2013. In 2014, she was a Taiwan Fund for Children and Families's Child Protection Ambassador. Her third album was released in September 2014. In it, she tried to focus more on "arts rhythm of the steps of a dance" to show a varied aspect of hers in terms of style of music and her appearance.

== Discography ==
=== Studio albums ===
Title	Album details	Track listing
Evil Girl 惡女	Released: 26 August 2011; Label: Wonderful Music; Formats: CD, digital download	Track listing: 1. 快快愛 (feat. MC HotDog); 2. 戀愛應援團; 3. 乖乖牌; 4. 我可以很勇敢; 5. 哎呀呀呀; 6. 惡女; 7. Hola; 8. 什麼都依你; 9. 無可救愛; 10. 人兒何處歸
Sing For You 單身極品	Released: 11 January 2013; Label: Wonderful Music; Formats: CD, digital download	Track listing: 1. 唯舞; 2. Don't Cry; 3. 沒有你的明天; 4. 我們都在等待; 5. 超完美極品; 6. 殘酷遊戲; 7. 呼呼; 8. 單身日記; 9. 愛得好寂寞; 10. 愛情天敵; 11. 藍色星球; 12. 愛的動名片
With You 在一起	Released: 19 September 2014; Label: Wonderful Music; Formats: CD, digital download	Track listing: 1. 哈囉; 2. 在一起; 3. 新宿; 4. 女孩，站出來!; 5. 全面投降; 6. U HOOO; 7. 不想軟弱; 8. 為愛出任務; 9. 姐妹最大; 10. 你所不知道的我; 11. 愛要安心呀 (feat. Hsiao Hung-jen); 12. 女孩，站出來!; 13. 呼呼 (Remix); 14. 唯舞 (Remix); 15. 新宿 (Acoustic Orchestra)
Live Beautifully 人生要漂亮	Released: 31 October 2016; Label: Wonderful Music; Formats: CD, digital download	Track listing: 1. Super跩; 2. 靚仔 (feat. Show Lo); 3. 別再撐了; 4. 要愛的迷信; 5. 人生要漂亮; 6. 放大鏡; 7. Kiss Me; 8. 慢陀螺; 9. B生活; 10. 做伙行
Ai De Qi 愛得起	Released: 7 August 2020; Label: Universal Music Taiwan; Formats: CD, digital download	Track listing: 1. 愛得起; 2. 來追我男友吧; 3. 臉盲症; 4. 低頭戰 feat. 宋柏緯 Edison Song; 5. 情能補拙; 6. 一半; 7. 活過來; 8. 超女力; 9. 愛巡演; 10. 夠不著的你

== Filmography ==
=== Television series ===
Year	English title	Original title	Role	Notes
2010	Rice Family	飯糰之家	Chiu Yi-wu's ex-girlfriend	Cameo
2010	Chong Wu Yen	鍾無艷	Amy	
2010	Love Buffet	愛似百匯	Yi-ching	
2013	Love SOS	愛情急整室	Lu Yi-chieh	
2014	Apple in Your Eye	妹妹	Chou Chi-wei	
2015	To the Dearest Intruder	致，第三者	Sung Chia-an	
2016	Prince of Wolf	狼王子	Tien Mi-mi	
2016	A Good Day	美好年代	Amber	
2017	What She Put on the Table	植劇場－五味八珍的歲月	Fu Pei-mei	
2017	Running Man			
2019	Hello Again!	你有念大學嗎？	Chang Ke-ai	
2020	Moonlight Romance	月老戀習生	Fang Duo-mi	
TBA	Count Your Lucky Day	言承旭劇之吻	Lu He Jin	

=== Film ===
Year	English title	Original title	Role	Notes
2012	Westgate Tango	西門町	Hsiao-meng	
2013	Forever Love	阿嬤的夢中情人	Young Chiang Mei-yue	
2013	The Stolen Years	被偷走的那五年	Lily	
2016	The Big Power	大顯神威	Lin Ching-hsia	
2018	The Big Day	簡單的婚禮	An Shuyu	
2018	Nguyen Thi Bich Hoa and Her Two Men	華視金選劇場-阮氏碧花與她的兩個男人	Nguyen Thi Bich Hoa	Television
2019	Killer Not Stupid	殺手不笨	Talia	
2022	The Post-Truth World	罪後真相	Chang Cheng-yi's sister	

=== Variety show ===
Year	English title	Original title	Notes
2008	Bingo King	爆桿賓果王	Assistant host
2009	Celebrity Imitated Show	全民最大黨	Cast member
2010	Start! Game Party	電玩大牌黨	Host, season 2
2010–2011	Guess	我猜我猜我猜猜猜	Stand-in host
2010	The Game of Killing	天黑請閉眼	Host
2011	GameGX	電玩快打	Host

=== Music video ===
Year	Artist	Song title
2009	Joanna Wang	"Nobody's A Nun"
2009	Shaun	"Devil's Tears"
2009	Tiger Huang	"More Difficult Than It Seems"
2011	One Two Free	"Bollywood"
2013	Vision Wei	"Hello"
2014	Alan Ko	"Free the Romance"
2014	Miss Ko	"Selfie Addict"

== Theater ==
Year	English title	Original title
2009	Der Hässliche	醜男子
2011	Crazy Co. Ltd	瘋狂有限公司

== Awards and nominations ==
Year	Award	Category	Nominated work	Result
2018	53rd Golden Bell Awards	Best Leading Actress in a Miniseries or Television Film	Nguyen Thi Bich Hoa and Her Two Men	Nominated
2023	58th Golden Bell Awards	Best Leading Actress in a Television Series	Oxcart Trails	Nominated
