= Utopia World Tour =

2015–2017 concert tour by A-Mei

- Tour by A-Mei
- Associated album: Faces of Paranoia; Amit 2
- Start date: April 4, 2015
- End date: December 30, 2017
- No. of shows: 104
- Attendance: 2.5 million
- Box office: $202.2 million

A-Mei concert chronology
- Ameizing World Tour （2011–13）; Utopia World Tour （2015–17）; ASMR World Tour (2022–25)

The Utopia World Tour (Chinese: 乌托邦世界巡城演唱会) is the seventh headlining concert tour by Taiwanese singer A-Mei (張惠妹). The tour began on April 4, 2015, the same day as the release of her studio album, Amit 2. An extension of the tour, titled Utopia 2.0 Carnival World, commenced in Shanghai in December 2016.

The tour attracted a total of around 2.5 million people and grossed around NT$6 billion (US$202 million), making it one of the highest-grossing concert tours by a female artist.

== Critical reception ==
The tour received generally positive reviews from music critics. Hon Jing-yi from Today Online remarked that, A-Mei "schooled us all on what it means to hold a concert – and certainly what it means to be the reigning Queen of Mandopop. The show, in short, was a cathartic experience." Reviewing the show at the Singapore Indoor Stadium, Boon Chan from The Straits Times wrote how "A-mei moved effortlessly from one scenario to the other", "equally at ease belting out ballads or firing up the high-octane dance numbers". He added, "It took a while though before her vocals warmed up fully", but by the end of the night, "A-mei sounded like she could sing for another 20 years."

== Commercial performance ==
The ten shows at the Taipei Arena in Taipei in April 2015 sold out 120,000 tickets in twelve minutes. The concerts in Kaohsiung, Taiwan at the Kaohsiung Arena sold out around 100,000 tickets and grossed NT$200 million.

== Economic effects ==
Following the conclusion of the concerts in Kaohsiung, Taiwanese media outlets reported that the concerts brought around NT$1 billion in tourism revenue to the city.

== Tour dates ==
Utopia World Tour dates
Date	City	Country	Venue	Attendance
April 4, 2015	Taipei	Taiwan	Taipei Arena	120,000
April 5, 2015	Taipei	Taiwan	Taipei Arena	120,000
April 6, 2015	Taipei	Taiwan	Taipei Arena	120,000
April 8, 2015	Taipei	Taiwan	Taipei Arena	120,000
April 9, 2015	Taipei	Taiwan	Taipei Arena	120,000
April 10, 2015	Taipei	Taiwan	Taipei Arena	120,000
April 11, 2015	Taipei	Taiwan	Taipei Arena	120,000
April 13, 2015	Taipei	Taiwan	Taipei Arena	120,000
April 14, 2015	Taipei	Taiwan	Taipei Arena	120,000
April 15, 2015	Taipei	Taiwan	Taipei Arena	120,000
May 2, 2015	Shanghai	China	Shanghai Stadium	—
May 9, 2015	Chengdu	China	Chengdu Sports Center	—
May 16, 2015	Fuzhou	China	Fuzhou Stadium	—
May 23, 2015	Chongqing	China	Chongqing Olympic Sports Center	—
May 30, 2015	Xi'an	China	Shaanxi Provincial Stadium	—
June 6, 2015	Mianyang	China	Mianyang New Convention & Exhibition Center	—
June 13, 2015	Tianjin	China	Tianjin Olympic Center Stadium	—
June 20, 2015	Jinan	China	Shandong Provincial Stadium	—
July 4, 2015	Shenyang	China	Shenyang Olympic Sports Center Stadium	—
July 11, 2015	Taiyuan	China	Shanxi Sports Centre Stadium	—
July 18, 2015	Harbin	China	HICEC Stadium	—
September 12, 2015	Zhengzhou	China	Henan Provincial Stadium	30,000
September 19, 2015	Nanjing	China	Wutaishan Stadium	—
September 30, 2015	Dalian	China	Dalian Sports Center Stadium	—
October 11, 2015	Beijing	China	Workers' Stadium	—
October 24, 2015	Nanchang	China	Nanchang International Sports Center Stadium	—
November 7, 2015	Guiyang	China	Guiyang Olympic Sports Center Stadium	—
November 14, 2015	Nanning	China	Guangxi Sports Center Stadium	—
November 21, 2015	Xiamen	China	Xiamen Sports Center Stadium	—
November 28, 2015	Shenzhen	China	Shenzhen Bay Sports Center Stadium	—
December 12, 2015	Hefei	China	Hefei Olympic Sports Center Stadium	—
December 19, 2015	Guangzhou	China	Tianhe Stadium	—
January 9, 2016	Singapore		National Stadium	20,000
January 16, 2016	Hong Kong	China	Hong Kong Coliseum	—
January 17, 2016	Hong Kong	China	Hong Kong Coliseum	—
January 24, 2016	Tokyo	Japan	Zepp Tokyo	—
April 3, 2016	Auckland	New Zealand	The Trusts Arena	—
April 8, 2016	Sydney	Australia	Sydney SuperDome	—
April 10, 2016	Melbourne	Australia	Melbourne Convention and Exhibition Center	—
April 16, 2016	Bangkok	Thailand	Siam Paragon	5,000
April 30, 2016	Kuala Lumpur	Malaysia	Stadium Merdeka	18,000
May 7, 2016	Changzhou	China	Changzhou Olympic Sports Centre	—
May 28, 2016	Changsha	China	Helong Sports Center Stadium	—
June 11, 2016	Macau	China	Cotai Arena	—
June 18, 2016	Xuzhou	China	Xuzhou Olympic Sports Center Stadium	—
July 9, 2016	Baotou	China	Baotou Olympic Sports Center Stadium	—
August 27, 2016	Liuzhou	China	Liuzhou Sports Centre	—
September 3, 2016	Kunming	China	New Asia Sports City Stadium	—
September 18, 2016	Quanzhou	China	Quanzhou Sports Center	—
October 15, 2016	Xi'an	China	Shaanxi Provincial Stadium	—
November 19, 2016	Hangzhou	China	Yellow Dragon Sports Center	—
November 24, 2016	Uncasville	United States	Mohegan Sun Arena	—
November 26, 2016	Los Angeles	United States	Pechanga Resort and Casino	—
November 29, 2016	Vancouver	Canada	Thunderbird Sports Centre	—

Utopia 2.0 Carnival World Tour dates
Date	City	Country	Venue	Attendance
December 16, 2016	Shanghai	China	Mercedes-Benz Arena	—
December 17, 2016	Shanghai	China	Mercedes-Benz Arena	—
December 24, 2016	Guangzhou	China	Guangzhou International Sports Arena	—
December 25, 2016	Guangzhou	China	Guangzhou International Sports Arena	—
February 17, 2017	Genting Highlands	Malaysia	Arena of Stars	—
February 18, 2017	Genting Highlands	Malaysia	Arena of Stars	—
March 22, 2017	London	England	Hammersmith Apollo	—
March 25, 2017	Milan	Italy	Teatro Linear4 Ciak	—
March 28, 2017	Madrid	Spain	Palacio Vistalegre	—
April 22, 2017	Shenzhen	China	Shenzhen Bay Sports Center Gymnasium	—
April 23, 2017	Shenzhen	China	Shenzhen Bay Sports Center Gymnasium	—
April 29, 2017	Chongqing	China	Chongqing Expo Center Central Hall	—
April 30, 2017	Chongqing	China	Chongqing Expo Center Central Hall	—
May 3, 2017	Macau	China	Studio City Arena	—
May 5, 2017	Chengdu	China	Sichuan Provincial Gymnasium	—
May 6, 2017	Chengdu	China	Sichuan Provincial Gymnasium	—
May 13, 2017	Nanjing	China	Nanjing Olympic Sports Center Gymnasium	—
May 20, 2017	Beijing	China	LeTV Sports Ecological Center	—
May 21, 2017	Beijing	China	LeTV Sports Ecological Center	—
June 3, 2017	Nanchang	China	Nanchang In'tl Sports Center Gymnasium	—
June 9, 2017	Singapore		Singapore Indoor Stadium	14,400
June 10, 2017	Singapore		Singapore Indoor Stadium	14,400
June 17, 2017	Changsha	China	Hunan In'tl Convention & Exhibition Center	—
July 1, 2017	Wuhan	China	Wuhan Sports Center Gymnasium	—
July 2, 2017	Wuhan	China	Wuhan Sports Center Gymnasium	—
July 8, 2017	Hefei	China	Binhu In'tl Convention & Exhibition Center	—
July 9, 2017	Hefei	China	Binhu In'tl Convention & Exhibition Center	—
July 15, 2017	Zhengzhou	China	Zhengzhou Int'l Convention & Exhibition Center	—
July 28, 2017	Foshan	China	Foshan Lingnan Mingzhu Gymnasium	—
July 29, 2017	Foshan	China	Foshan Lingnan Mingzhu Gymnasium	—
August 12, 2017	Kaohsiung	Taiwan	Kaohsiung Arena	100,000
August 13, 2017	Kaohsiung	Taiwan	Kaohsiung Arena	100,000
August 18, 2017	Kaohsiung	Taiwan	Kaohsiung Arena	100,000
August 19, 2017	Kaohsiung	Taiwan	Kaohsiung Arena	100,000
August 20, 2017	Kaohsiung	Taiwan	Kaohsiung Arena	100,000
August 25, 2017	Kaohsiung	Taiwan	Kaohsiung Arena	100,000
August 26, 2017	Kaohsiung	Taiwan	Kaohsiung Arena	100,000
August 27, 2017	Kaohsiung	Taiwan	Kaohsiung Arena	100,000
September 2, 2017	Taiyuan	China	Shanxi Provincial Sports Center Gymnasium	—
September 9, 2017	Qingdao	China	Conson Gymnasium	—
October 7, 2017	Hong Kong	China	Hong Kong Coliseum	—
October 8, 2017	Hong Kong	China	Hong Kong Coliseum	—
November 25, 2017	Jinhua	China	Jinhua Sports Center Gymnasium	—
December 2, 2017	Tianjin	China	Tianjin Olympic Centre	—
December 16, 2017	Xiamen	China	Jiageng Stadium	—
December 23, 2017	Hangzhou	China	Huanglong Sports Center Gymnasium	—
December 24, 2017	Hangzhou	China	Huanglong Sports Center Gymnasium	—
December 29, 2017	Shanghai	China	Mercedes-Benz Arena	—
December 30, 2017	Shanghai	China	Mercedes-Benz Arena	—
Total				2,500,000
