= Yong-Jiu Grocery Store =

2019 Taiwanese television series

- Promotional poster
- Genre: Romance; Drama; Family
- Based on: Comic book "Yong-Jiu Grocery Store" by Ruan Guangmin
- Written by: Chen Jie-ying; Huang Hsuan-ying; Hsiao I.-Wei
- Directed by: Kao Pin-chuan; Tseng Ying-ting
- Starring: Derek Chang: Christina Mok
- Opening theme: That Store (聽說有間店) - Young
- Ending theme: Lost and Found (失物招领)- Princess Ai
- Country of origin: Taiwan
- Original languages: Mandarin; Taiwanese Hokkien
- No. of series: 1
- No. of episodes: 10

Production
- Executive producer: Lin Xiangling
- Producer: Hsu Kuo-lun
- Production locations: Taipei; Tainan; Chiayi; Yunlin County
- Running time: 90 minutes (per episode)
- Production companies: Fox Networks Group Asia Pacific, Taiwan Branch; Content Digital Film Company; Loulou Film

Original release
- Network: CTS Main Channel; SET Metro; Star Chinese Channel; Iqiyi Taiwan; Line TV; Vidol; FOX+
- Release: August 16 – October 18, 2019

Yong-Jiu Grocery Store (Chinese: 用九柑仔店) is a 2019 Taiwanese television series directed by Kao Pin-chuan and Tseng Ying-ting. The series was adapted from the comic by Ruan Guangmin of the same name, and starring Derek Chang and Christina Mok. It airs on CTS Main Channel and SET Metro starting August 16, 2019.

Yong-Jiu Grocery Store became the 17th-highest rated Taiwanese drama in 2019.

== Plot ==
Yang Chun-Lung (Derek Chang) is an elite employee of a construction company. Just turned 30, he bought a house, his job was also favorable, and he became the youngest senior manager of the company. The prospect is so open, but behind that are days of intense work, social parties that make him tired and confused. Seeing the fathers and uncles in the company sacrifice their health, family, and friendship for the sake of work, he suddenly wondered if this was the life he wanted? And then a phone call broke the trajectory of Yang Chun-Lung's life. His grandfather Yang Chin-te (Lin I-hsiung) suddenly fell seriously ill, the situation was not very optimistic. Chun-lung quit his job, rushed back to his hometown, only in time to see his grandfather lying on a hospital bed, falling into a coma, unconscious.

After the doctor explained his illness, Chun-lung plans to close the grocery store. If Grandpa regains consciousness, he will bring him back to Taipei to live with him. Grandpa's longtime neighbors, though sorry for the grocery store and his hard work for many years, also understand Chun-lung's difficulty. In just one night, Chun-lung was immediately summoned to Taipei by the company to handle a difficult project. In the process, facing the questioning voice of the old homeowner Zhao, Chun-lung dreamily discovers that although life in Taipei is bustling, what he misses is his childhood in his hometown....

== Cast ==
- Derek Chang as Yang Chun-Lung
  - Chen Dingzhong as Yang Chun-Lung (child)
  - Chen Shaohui as Yang Chun-Lung (teenager)
- Christina Mok as Chen Chao-Chun
  - Weng Nini as Chen Chao-Chun (young)
- Lin I-hsiung as Yang Chin-te
  - Edison Wang as Yang Chin-te (young)
- Lei Hung as Yong Bo
  - J.C. Lin as Yong Bo (young)
- Lung Shao-hua as Miao Gong
  - Lin Yu-hsien as Miao Gong (young)
- Huang Hsi-tien as Shui Kun
  - Emerson Tsai as Shui Kun (young)
- Wang Man-chiao as Shu-chih
  - Yang Min as Shu-chih (young)
- Roy Chiu as Chiang En-Pei
- Hou Yan-xi as Tsai Liang-Chin
  - Xie En Ci as Tsai Liang-Chin (young)
- Allen Chen as Jian Zhong Sheng
  - Hu Qian He as Jian Zhong Shen (young)
- Ding Guo Lin as Yu Yun
  - Sun Ke Fan as Yu Yun (young)
- Chen Ya Chen as Feng Yu
- Zhang Wen Qi as Zheng Shu Fen
  - Lu Yi En as Zheng Shu Fen (young)
- Gingle Wang as Yin Yueh

== Reception ==
Episodes ratings
Chapter	Air Date	Average Ratings	Rank
1	August 16, 2019	0.78%	4
2	August 23, 2019	0.81%	4
3	August 30, 2019	0.68%	3
4	September 6, 2019	0.66%	3
5	September 13, 2019	0.59%	3
6	September 20, 2019	0.66%	3
7	September 27, 2019	0.65%	3
8	October 4, 2019	0.78%	3
9	October 11, 2019	0.66%	
10	October 18, 2019	0.67%	
Average ratings		0.69%	--

== Awards and nominations ==
Year	Ceremony	Category	Nominee	Result
2020	55th Golden Bell Awards	Best Television Series	Yong-Jiu Grocery Store	Nominated
2020	55th Golden Bell Awards	Best Director in a Television Series	Kao Pin-chuan, Tseng Ying-ting	Won
2020	55th Golden Bell Awards	Best Writing for a Television Series	Chen Jie-ying, Huang Hsuan-Ying, Hsiao I.-Wei	Nominated
2020	55th Golden Bell Awards	Best Leading Actress in a Television Series	Christina Mok	Nominated
2020	55th Golden Bell Awards	Best Supporting Actor in a Television Series	Hou Yan-xi	Nominated
2020	55th Golden Bell Awards	Best Cinematography	Ching-Di Li, Stanley Liu, Garvin Chan	Nominated
2020	55th Golden Bell Awards	Best Art and Design	Liao Yen-chou, Huang Yen-chun	Nominated
2020	3rd Asian Academy Creative Awards	Best Sound	George Chen, Annie Lo, Jimmy Lin	Nominated

== Broadcast ==
Region	Network	Dates	Notes
Taiwan (local)	CTS Main Channel, SET Metro	August 16, 2019 – October 18, 2019 (Every Friday 22:00-23:30)	Original
Taiwan (local)	Vidol TV	August 16, 2019 – October 18, 2019 (Available every Friday at 23:30)	Original
Taiwan (local)	IQIYI Taiwan	Starting from August 17, 2019 (available every Saturday at 00:00)	Original
Taiwan (local)	Line TV Taiwan	Starting from August 17, 2019 (available every Saturday at 00:00)	Original
Taiwan (local)	Star Chinese Channel	Starting from August 17, 2019 (Every Saturday 22:00-23:30)	Original
Taiwan (local)	FOX+	Starting from August 17, 2019 (Available every Saturday at 22:00)	Original
Taiwan (local)	Netflix Taiwan	The whole series has been released	Original
Taiwan (local)	Disney+ (Star)	Starting from November 12, 2021	Original
Taiwan (local)	myVideo	June 10, 2020	Original
Taiwan (local)	TVBS Entertainment Channel	July 11, 2021 - (Every Sunday 22:00－00:00)	Original
Malaysia	Astro Hua Hee Dai	August 17, 2020 - (Monday to Friday 21:30-23:00)	
Selected countries in the Americas, Europe, Middle East, South Asia	Viki	Starting from August 16, 2019 (Available every Friday at 00:00)	With subtitles
