= Prince of Wolf =

- Promotional poster
- 狼王子
- Genre: Romance; Fantasy; Action
- Created by: Sanlih E-Television
- Written by: Chen Bi Zhen 陳碧真; Zhan Yun Ru 詹韵如; Luo Ya An 羅雅安; Chen Mu Han 陳慕函; Zhu Sheng Hui 朱升惠; Wang You Zhen 王宥蓁 (Ep. 1–2)
- Directed by: Liu En Jie 劉恩捷 (Ep. 1–10); Chen Rong Hui 陳戎暉 (Ep. 4–9); Ye Hong Wei 葉鴻偉 (Ep. 10–18)
- Starring: Amber An 安心亞; Derek Chang 張軒睿; Samuel Gu 古斌; Katie Chen 陳語安; Hsueh Shih-ling 薛仕凌
- Opening theme: Love Magic 愛戀魔法 by Bii 畢書盡
- Ending theme: Stars 滿天星 by Dino Lee 李玉璽
- Country of origin: Taiwan
- Original languages: Mandarin; Hokkien
- No. of seasons: 1
- No. of episodes: 18

Production
- Producer: Yu Wei Zhong 俞惟中
- Production location: Taiwan
- Running time: 90 minutes
- Production companies: Sanlih E-Television 三立電視; Shenghua Entertainment Communication Co.Ltd 昇華娛樂傳播

Original release
- Network: TTV; SET Metro
- Release: 3 July – 6 November 2016

Related
- Refresh Man; Behind Your Smile

Prince of Wolf (Chinese: 狼王子; pinyin: láng wáng zǐ; literally "Wolf Prince") is a 2016 Taiwanese romance television series created and produced by Sanlih E-Television. Starring Derek Chang, Amber An, Samuel Gu, Katie Chen and Hsueh Shih-ling as the main cast. Filming began on June 9, 2016 and wrapped up on 28 October 2016. First original broadcast began on July 3, 2016 on TTV airing every Sunday night at 10:00–11:30 pm.

== Synopsis ==
The story begins with Du Zhe Ming (Zhang Yu Zheng) walking between the forest in the deep woods and his parents are searching for him. While wandering he saves a female wolf from harm. Du Zhe Ming is waiting for his parents but due to heavy rains his parents couldn't find him and the officer claim him to be dead. Seeing Du Zhe Ming alone the Wolf King decides to take Zhe Ming into the wolf tribe. After some years a grown Du Zhe Ming (Derek Chang) is living among the wolves knows how to hunt and survive in the wild without forgetting his human traits. Tian Mi Mi (Amber An) is an amateur photographer who decides to go to Wolf Mountain to take pictures of the breathtaking landscape. When Tian Mi Mi falls into a valley, Zhe Ming saves her and takes her back to his cave. Fascinated by the first woman he has encountered, Zhe Ming is convinced that Mi Mi is his female wolf mate and is mesmerized by her. So, Zhe Ming decides to leave his wolf life behind to follow Mi Mi back into the human world with his wolf.

In the human world Zhe Ming starts living with Mi Mi and her family. Mi Mi teach him to live human life and even makes him join in her office. Mi Mi works in a company under Jian Hao Wei (Samuel Gu). He is an adopted son of Jiang Ping (John) and Wen Pei Yi (Mandy), they are the parents of Du Zhe Ming. Zhe Ming encounters Hao Wei showing his love interest towards Mi Mi which makes a love triangle fight between them. But Mi Mi falls in love with Zhe Ming due to his innocence.

Mandy buys a gift and celebrates Zhe Ming birthday as every year in memory of her son with the faith that he will return. Soon John finds out about Zhe Ming existence and tries to keep him away from his company and family as he is the real heir which he does not want Hao Wei to lose. He plots many chaos against Zhe Ming and makes him lead back to the forest. When Chen Shu Pei (Lin Min Chen) finds out the real identity of Zhe Ming, she reveals about it to Mandy. With Mi Mi they go to the wolf mountain to bring Zhe Ming back. After arriving back Zhe Ming started staying with his family and reveals to his father that he did not forget his sin back in the childhood where John knowingly leaves Zhe Ming in between the forest. Hao Wei becomes furious about Zhe Ming handling the company and receiving more love and faith from his grandfather. Zhe Ming arrange marriage is fixed with Chen Shu Pei which allows John to separate him from Mi Mi. But with the help of their friends they conquer all the misunderstanding between them. John's every chaos against Zhe Ming starts failing and Hao Wei too left him and started supporting Zhe Ming after knowing the real intention of his father. John kills Zhe Ming's wolf in the cave and plots a plan to kill Zhe Ming too with an accident to end his problem but fails it by harming Hao Wei. In the hospital John confess to Mandy and her father about all his sins and also reveals that Hao Wei is his own son with his love. Mandy is furious with him but Zhe Ming Forgives him.

Mi Mi and Zhe Ming got married but stays separately for her career and after completing her work she returns to Zhe Ming in the party. Chen Shu Pei and Hao Wei starts developing feelings for each other. In the end Zhe Ming and his son walks between the trees of the wolf mountain but soon he disappear while Zhe Ming was talking to Mi Mi in phone. When Mi Mi and Zhe Ming starts searching all over the forest they ends up finding their son and Zhe Ming's wolf alive.

== Cast ==
=== Main cast ===
- Derek Chang 杜軒睿 as Du Zhe Ming 杜澤明（Wolf）
  - Zhang Yu Zheng 張育誠 as childhood Zhe Ming
- Amber An 安心亞 as Tian Mi Mi 田蜜蜜
- Samuel Gu 古斌 as Jian Hao Wei/Du Hao Wei 簡浩維/杜浩維
- Katie Chen 陳語安 as Tian Zi Zi 田滋滋
- Hsueh Shih-ling 薛仕凌 as Jiang Ping 江平（John）
- Lin Min Chen 林明禎 as Chen Shu Pei 陳舒裴

=== Supporting cast ===
- Chen Bor-jeng 陳博正 as Tian Min Gui 田閩貴
- Yang Chieh-mei 楊潔玫 as Liu Mei Lian 劉美蓮
- Yang Lie 楊烈 as Du Bai Quan 杜百全
- Lin Wei 林煒 as Du Qi Hong 杜奇宏
- Hsieh Chiung-hsuan 謝瓊煖 as Wen Pei Yi 溫佩儀（Mandy）
- Wang Chuan 王琄 as Mrs. Wu
- Fish Lin 鲶魚哥 as Huang Shen Nong 黃神農
- Huang Zi Wen 匡自文 as Li Shi Zhen 李時真

=== Cameos ===
- Hsiao Ching-hung 蕭景鴻 as huntsman
- ?? as Jia Hong 家宏
- Lee Kuo-chao 李國超 as Mr. Zhang
- Fiona Huang 黃錦雯 as Mrs. Zhang
- ?? as Zhang Xiao Bao 張小寶
- Zhong Lun Li 鍾倫理 as Old Wang 老王
- ?? as Maggie
- Lin Jing Zhe 林靖哲 as David
- Wu Jia Wei 吳珈瑋 as Lucy
- Josie Leung 梁家榕 as Jian Mei Hui 簡美惠
- Amanda Liu 劉紀範 as Penny
- Akio Chen 陳慕義 as Xu Guo Long 許國隆
- Su Yi Jing 蘇意菁 as Su Li Fang 蘇麗芳
- ?? as Xu Xiao Zhi 許小志
- Kao Meng-chieh 高盟傑 as Scrivener Li
- Zhu Yong De 朱永德 as Doctor Zhu
- Chen Yu-mei 陳玉玫 as Lisa
- Jessica Hsu 許妍庭 as Xue Sheng

== Soundtrack ==
- Love Magic 愛戀魔法 by Bii 畢書盡
- Stars 滿天星 by Dino Lee 李玉璽
- Funky Boy by Bii 畢書盡
- I Will Miss You by Bii 畢書盡
- Sweet Little Baby by Bii 畢書盡
- Kiss Me by Amber An 安心亞
- Magnifier 放大鏡 by Amber An 安心亞
- Friends 朋友 by Wakin Chau 周華健
- Lucy Bear 玩具熊 by Dino Lee 李玉璽

== Broadcast ==
Network	Country	Airing Date	Timeslot
TTV	Taiwan	July 3, 2016	Sunday 10:00–11:30 pm
SET Metro	Taiwan	July 9, 2016	Saturday 10:00–11:30 pm
E City	Singapore	August 20, 2016	Saturday 9:30–11:00 pm
TVB; Chinese Drama	Hong Kong	September 3, 2016	Saturday 1:00–2:30 pm
Astro Shuang Xing	Malaysia	December 16, 2016	Monday to Friday 4:00–5:00 pm
VTV2	Vietnam	April 10, 2020	Everyday 7:00-7:45 pm
THTG	Vietnam	May 1, 2020	Everyday 5:30 pm
GTV	Philippines	June 21, 2021	Monday to Friday 2:00-3:00PM

== Episode ratings ==
Competing dramas on rival channels airing at the same time slot were:

- CTV – Nie Xiaoqian, Uncontrollably Fond, Don't Dare to Dream
- FTV – The King of Drama

Air Date	Episode	Episode Title	Average Ratings	Rank
Jul 3, 2016	1	Love and Trust 愛與信任	1.57	1
Jul 10, 2016	2	Tears From Polaris 北極星的眼淚	1.66	1
Jul 17, 2016	3	Wishing Tree's Promise 許願樹的約定	1.66	1
Jul 24, 2016	4	Zhe Ming's Family 澤明的家人	1.65	1
Jul 31, 2016	5	Love Magic 戀愛魔法	1.65	1
Aug 7, 2016	6	Kiss Me	1.19	2
Aug 14, 2016	7	The Distance Between Us 我們之間的距離	1.64	1
Aug 21, 2016	8	Into Your World 走進你的世界	1.47	1
Aug 28, 2016	9	Listen To Your Heart	1.46	2
Sep 4, 2016	10	Choice 抉擇	1.44	1
Sep 11, 2016	11	I Miss You	1.28	1
Sep 18, 2016	12	Love is Giving, The Feeling is Inclusive 愛是付出 情是包容	1.44	1
Sep 25, 2016	13	Can't Control The Heartbeat 不能控制的心跳	1.49	1
Oct 2, 2016	14	Only You Forever In My Mind	1.31	1
Oct 9, 2016	15	As Long As You Live Well 只要妳好好活著	1.68	1
Oct 16, 2016	16	Second Uncle's Secret 二叔的秘密	1.51	1
Oct 23, 2016	17	Redemption 救贖	1.34	1
Oct 30, 2016	18	1+1>2	1.55	1
Nov 6, 2016	Special Episode		–	–
Average ratings			1.50^{1}	–

^Note 1: The average rating calculation does not include special episode.

== Awards and nominations ==
Year	Ceremony	Category	Nominee	Result
2016	2016 Sanlih Drama Awards	Viewers Choice Drama Award	Prince of Wolf	Won
2016	2016 Sanlih Drama Awards	Best Actor Award	Derek Chang	Won
2016	2016 Sanlih Drama Awards	Best Actress Award	Amber An	Won
2016	2016 Sanlih Drama Awards	Best Potential Award	Derek Chang	Won
2016	2016 Sanlih Drama Awards	Best Powerful Performance Award	Lin Wei	Won
2016	2016 Sanlih Drama Awards	Best Crying Award	Amber An & Derek Chang	Won
2016	2016 Sanlih Drama Awards	Best Kiss Award	Amber An & Derek Chang	Won
2016	2016 Sanlih Drama Awards	Best Screen Couple Award	Amber An & Derek Chang	Won
2016	2016 Sanlih Drama Awards	Viewers Choice Drama's Song Award	"Love Magic" – Bii	Won
