= Hello Again! =

Taiwanese television series

- Promotional poster
- 你有念大學嗎？
- Genre: Romantic comedy
- Written by: Lu Yi Hua 陸亦華 (Ep. 1-3, 5-7, 10-12); Wang You Zhen 王宥蓁 (Ep. 2-16); Chen Qun 陳群 (Ep. 3, 5, 8-12); Lan Meng He 藍夢荷 (Ep. 6-16); Mai Zhi Cheng 麥智埕 (Ep. 6-16); Ma Qian Dai 馬千代 (Ep. 10-12)
- Directed by: Liu Guang Hui 柳廣輝 (Ep. 1-3); Yu Qian Qian 余蒨蒨 (Ep. 2-16); Wu Meng En 吳蒙恩 (Ep. 14-16)
- Starring: Amber An; Bruce Hung; Sean Lee; Mao Di; Oceana Wu
- Opening theme: Chillaxing by Amber An
- Ending theme: What's Wrong by Eric Chou
- Country of origin: Taiwan
- Original language: Mandarin
- No. of episodes: 16

Production
- Producers: Zhang Man Na 張曼娜; Chen Yong Lai 陳永來
- Production location: Taiwan
- Production companies: Sanlih E-Television 三立電視; Creative Jiu Jiu Film Production Co., Ltd 創藝玖玖電影製作有限公司

Original release
- Network: TTV; SET Metro
- Release: 6 January – 28 April 2019

Related
- Campus Heroes; Back to Home

Hello Again! (Chinese: 你有念大學嗎？; pinyin: Nǐ Yǒu Niàn Dàxué Ma?) is a 2019 Taiwanese romantic comedy television series starring Amber An and Bruce Hung. It aired on Taiwan Television on Sundays at 10:00 pm. It was created and produced by Sanlih E-Television.

== Plot ==
In high school, 100 days before the university entrance exams, Chang Ke Ai and Yang Zi Hao made a bet: if they are admitted to the same university, she will carry his schoolbag for an entire year! Unexpectedly she had to give up her dreams of university to pay off a family debt. Ten years later, they are just across the street, but in two different worlds. Yang Zi Hao is an executive vice president of "Gorgeous Department Store," while Chang Ke Ai is a street vendor who helps her mother sell clothes at a market. When they meet again, will they remember the bet from ten years ago?

== Cast ==
=== Main cast ===
- Amber An as Chang Ke Ai 常可艾
- Bruce Hung as Yang Zi Hao 陽子浩
- Sean Lee (邵翔) as Cai Xiao Gang 蔡小剛
- Mao Di as Liang Zi Jie 梁子傑
- Oceana Wu as Jian Zhen Yi 簡貞怡 (Jamie Chien)

=== Supporting cast ===
- Stanley Mei (梅賢治) as Li Jian 李健
- Wang Pei Ying (汪沛滢) as Jiang Wen Wen 江雯雯
- Calvin Lee (地球) as Dan Ni Er 丹尼爾
- Jiang Yong Qi (江泳錡) as A La A辣
- Liang Yan Zhen (梁妍甄) as A Mi A咪
- Yin Fu (茵芙) as Zheng Yin Yin 鄭茵茵
- Ariel Chiao (喬雅琳) as Li Xiao Tian 李小恬
- Tiffany Pan (潘奕如) as Wu Xiang Yin 吳香吟
- Wang Dao Nan (王道南) as Yang Guo Tao 陽國滔
- Kelly Mi (米凱莉) as Lin Fang Jie 林芳婕
- Ruby Liu (劉馨如) as Lin Fang Ru 林芳如
- Mi Na (米娜) as Lin Fang Yu 林芳瑜
- Hu Pei Lian (胡佩蓮) as Zhuo Ying Ying 卓瑛瑛
- Lin Pei Jun (林珮君) as Jiang Li Hua 江麗花
- Long Tian Xiang (龍天翔) as Hu Ye 虎爺

== Soundtrack ==
- "Chillaxing" by Amber An
- "What's Wrong 怎麼了" by Eric Chou
- "The Chaos After You 如果雨之後" by Eric Chou
- "Nobody But Me" by Eric Chou
- "Unbreakable Love 永不失聯的愛" by Eric Chou
- "Say I Love You 說聲我愛你" by Xiao Pan Pan (小潘潘) & Qi Chen (齊晨)

== Broadcast ==
Network	Country	Airing Date	Timeslot
TTV Main Channel	Taiwan	6 Jan 2019	Sunday 10:00-11:30 pm
Vidol	Taiwan	6 Jan 2019	Sunday 11:30 pm
iQiyi	Taiwan	7 Jan 2019	Sunday 12:00 am
SET Metro	Taiwan	12 Jan 2019	Saturday 10:00-11:30 pm
dimsum	Malaysia; Singapore	15 Feb 2019	Saturday 11:30 pm
UNTV	Philippines	This 2021	TBA

== Ratings ==
Competing programmes on rival channels airing at the same time slot were:

- EBC Variety - Five Missions, Brave to Love, Hot Door Night, Half and Half (TV series)
- SET Taiwan - Super Red
- FTV - A Taiwanese Tale of Two Cities, Schrodinger's Cat (TV series) (re-run), Music of Taiwan, The Mouse Serves A Guest Tea
- CTV - Chinese Restaurant, The Next (season 2)
- CTS - Hi Princess, CTS Golden Selection Theatre
- PTS - Mystery in the Mist, The World Between Us, The Way Home

Air Date	Episode	Average Ratings	Rank
Jan 6, 2019	1	1.32	1
Jan 13, 2019	2	1.48	1
Jan 20, 2019	3	1.39	1
Jan 27, 2019	4	1.37	1
Feb 3, 2019	SP	--	-
Feb 10, 2019	5	1.34	1
Feb 17, 2019	6	1.39	1
Feb 24, 2019	7	1.60	1
Mar 3, 2019	8	1.45	1
Mar 10, 2019	9	1.58	1
Mar 17, 2019	10	1.39	1
Mar 24, 2019	11	1.46	1
Mar 31, 2019	12	1.28	2
Apr 7, 2019	13	1.14	2
Apr 14, 2019	14	1.31	2
Apr 21, 2019	15	1.28	2
Apr 28, 2019	16	1.63	1
Average ratings		1.40	
