= Taiwan Fund for Children and Families =

Taiwanese charitable organization

- 台灣兒童暨家庭扶助基金會
- Abbreviation: TFCF
- Founded: 1938
- Type: NGO
- Purpose: Support and care for disadvantaged children and families.
- Region served: 34 Countries
- Formerly called: China's Children Fund (1938–1951); Christian Children’s Fund (1951–1983); Chinese Children’s Fund (1983–1999); Chinese Fund for Children and Families (1999–2002); Taiwan Fund for Children and Families (2002- )

Press conference for the Taiwan Fund for Children and Families (TFCF)

Taiwan Fund for Children and Families (TFCF; Chinese: 台灣兒童暨家庭扶助基金會) is a nonprofit organization in Taiwan that provides services to vulnerable children and families who are below 18 years of age. “Livelihood Supports” and “Child Protection” are its two main target programs. Regardless of race, religion and gender, TFCF was founded in 1950 with a helping hand from Christian Children's Fund, a NGO from Virginia, United States. It went independent during 1985. Presently, it has 24 branch offices, 1 Ta-Tung Children's Home and other 11 Affiliates, 3 Non-profit Kindergartens as well as 7 overseas branch offices in Mongolia, Kyrgyzstan, Kingdom of Eswatini, Vietnam, Cambodia, Jordan, and Philippines. They also collaborate with ChildFund International USA, Children Believe, ChildFund Australia, and PLAN BØRNEfonden to provide children sponsorship program to help over 60,000 needy children across 34 countries.

== History ==
1938 – China’s Children Fund (CCF) was established in Richmond, Virginia, by the Christians in the United States.
1950 – Set up the first family-style orphanage in Taiwan and took over Ta-Tung Children’s Home.
1951 – CCF changed its name to Christian Children’s Fund, Christian Children’s Fund of Taiwan.
1964 – CCF Taiwan Field Office was formally established and 23 branch offices were set up gradually to provide services to needy children and families in Taiwan.
1985 – CCF/Taiwan became fully independent from Christian Children’s Fund and no longer received financial support from foreign donors.
1987 – CCF/Taiwan launched the Foreign Children Sponsorship Program and started sponsoring children in Asia, America, and Africa. It provided Child Protection Program in Taiwan.
1999 – Changed its name to Chinese Fund for Children and Families/Taiwan (CCF/Taiwan). Received the National Social Welfare Prize issued by the government.
2002 – Changed its name to Taiwan Fund for Children and Families (TFCF).
2004 – Mongolia Branch Office was registered as their first Branch Office abroad.
2008 – Started providing services in China.
2012 – Kyrgyzstan Branch Office was registered as their second Branch Office abroad.
2013 – TFCF launched a Child Protection Day on April 28. Kingdom of Eswatini Branch Office was registered as their third Branch Office abroad.
2014 – Vietnam Branch Office was registered as their fourth Branch Office abroad.
2015 – Cambodia Branch Office was registered as their fifth Branch Office abroad.
2016 – Matsu Branch Office was registered as their 24th Domestic Branch Office.
2017 – Became a full member of Accountable Now as the first eligible organization in Taiwan.
2018 – Jordan Branch Office was registered as their sixth Branch Office abroad.
2019 – Philippines Branch Office was registered as their seventh Branch Office abroad.
