= Miss Ko =

American singer-songwriter

- Born: Christine Ko; September 5, 1985 (age 41); Queens, New York, United States
- Genres: Mandopop Rap
- Occupations: singer; songwriter
- Instrument: Vocals
- Years active: 2009–present
- Labels: Asia Muse Entertainment Group Ltd (亞神音樂); Universal Music Group

Miss Ko is a Taiwanese-American singer-songwriter and rapper signed to Universal Music Group. Ko has released three studio albums and is the winner of Best New Artist of 24th Golden Melody Award in Taiwan.

== Life and career ==
Christine Ko was raised in Queens, New York. She graduated from Brooklyn Technical High School and attended Five Towns College.

Ko released her first album in 2009, while based in New York. She studied Mandarin at National Taiwan Normal University, and during that time participated in a rap competition, which brought her to the attention of an executive at the music label KAO!INC. She left a master's program at New York University to pursue her music career in Taiwan. In 2010, Miss Ko was regarded as a "newcomer to the scene," and Meredith Schweig observed that there were no other professional women rappers in Taiwan at the time.

=== 2012–2015: Knock Out and XXXIII ===
Ko released her debut album Knock Out on August 15, 2012. Knock Out peaked No. 1 on local music charts and won Ko Best New Artist at the 24th Annual Golden Melody Awards, in addition to "Most Outstanding Asian-American Youth Overseas" that same year.

On December 31, 2014, Ko released her second album XXXIII (33), which featured various artists such as Crowd Lu, Billie, and Amber An.

=== 2016–present: Queen of Queens ===
In 2016, Ko signed with Universal Music Group. On December 22, 2016, Ko released her third album Queen of Queens. The album reached No. 1 on i-Tunes and Spotify.

Ko was nominated for Best Female Artist at the 28th Golden Melody Awards in 2017.

On March 27, 2018, Ko was announced as the spokesperson for McDonald's.

== Discography ==
Albums

- Knock Out (August 15, 2012)
- XXXIII (December 31, 2014)
- Queen of Queens (December 22, 2016)

Collaborations

- "Walk This Way" by adidas unite all originals also feat. MC Hot Dog and Soft Lipa (2013)
- "Melting Gold" by Soft Lipa also feat. PG (2013)
- "瘋起來/Feng Qi Lai" by Sun Sheng Xi (2014)
- "愛不來/No Love" by Khalil Fong (2014)
- "跳進來/Jump In" by A-Mei (2014)
- "Extrication" by Shio (2016)

== Other ventures ==
On August 14, 2015, Ko performed and threw the ceremonial first pitch for her hometown team, the Mets, at Citi Field.
